= List of Greek films of the 2000s =

A list of notable films produced in Greece in the 2000s.

== 2000s ==
Title	Director	Cast	Genre	Notes
2000
Afti i nyhta menei (Αυτή η νύχτα μένει)	Nikos Panayotopoulos	Nikos Kouris, Athina Maximou	Romantic drama	6 Awards in Greek State Film Awards
Enas kai enas (Ένας κι ένας)	Nikos Zapatinas	Giorgos Kimoulis, Nikos Kalogeropoulos, Evelina Papoulia	Comedy	6 Awards in Greek State Film Awards
Fovou tous Ellines (Φοβού τους Έλληνες)	John Tatoulis	Lakis Lazopoulos, Zoe Carides, John Bluthal	Romantic comedy	
2001
Big Man, Little Love	Handan İpekçi	Sukran Gungor, Dilan Ercetin	Drama	Co-produced with Turkey and Hungary
The Only Journey of His Life (Το μόνον της ζωής του ταξείδιον)	Lakis Papastathis	Ilias Logothetis	Drama	7 Awards in Greek State Film Awards
The Seventh Sun of Love (Ο έβδομος ήλιος του έρωτα)	Vangelis Serdaris	Katerina Papadaki, Thodoris Skourtas	Drama	Entered into the 24th Moscow International Film Festival; 4 Awards in Greek State Film Awards
To Klama vgike ap' ton Paradeiso (Το Κλάμα Βγήκε απ' τον Παράδεισο)	Thanasis Papathanasiou, Michalis Reppas	Mina Adamaki, Anna Panayiotopoulou, Mirka Papakonstantinou	Musical comedy	
The Bubble (2001 film) (Η φούσκα)	Nikos Perakis	Maria Solomou, Alexis Georgoulis	Comedy	
2002
The King (Ο Βασιλιάς)	Nikos Grammatikos	Vangelis Mourikis, Marilita Lambropoulou	Drama	Golden Piramid in 2003 Cairo International Film Festival; 4 Awards in Greek State Film Awards
The Loser Takes It All (Ο χαμένος τα παίρνει όλα)	Nikos Nikolaidis	Giannis Aggelakas, Simeon Nikolaidis, Jenny Kitseli	Drama	2 Awards in Greek State Film Awards
Tired Of Killing Your Lovers (Κουράστηκα να σκοτώνω τους αγαπητικούς σου)	Nikos Panayotopoulos	Nicos Arvanitis, Theofania Papathoma, Akilas Karazisis	Drama	
2003
A Touch of Spice (Πολίτικη Κουζίνα)	Tassos Boulmetis	Georges Corraface	Comedy drama	The second highest-grossing Greek film of all time 8 Awards in Greek State Film Awards
Hazardous and Unhealthy (Βαρέα και Ανθυγιεινά)	Antonis Papadoupoulos	Paschalis Tsarouhas		Entered into the 26th Moscow International Film Festival
Return of the Bastards (Επιστροφή Των Καθαρμάτων)	Fokionas Bogris	Apostolos Souglakos, Christos Natsios	Crime/Thriller	
2004
Nyfes (Brides, Οι νύφες)	Pantelis Voulgaris	Damian Lewis, Victoria Haralabidou	Drama/History	entered into the 27th Moscow International Film Festival; 10 Awards in Greek State Film Awards
Trilogy: The Weeping Meadow	Theodoros Angelopoulos	Alexandra Aidini, Nikos Poursanidis	Drama	FIPRESCI Award at the European Film Awards 2004
Real Life	Panos H. Koutras	Nikos Kouris	Drama	
2005
Loufa kai parallagi: Seirines sto Aigaio (Λούφα και παραλλαγή: Σειρήνες στο Αιγαίο)	Nikos Perakis	Yannis Tsimitselis	Comedy	The highest-grossing Greek film of all time
I Horodia tou Haritona (Η χορωδία του Χαρίτωνα)	Grigoris Karantinakis	Georges Corraface, Akilas Karazisis, Maria Nafpliotou	Comedy	2 Awards in Greek State Film Awards
The Wake (Αγρύπνια)	Nikos Grammatikos	Vangelis Mourikis		Entered into the 28th Moscow International Film Festival; 2 Awards in Greek State Film Awards
The Zero Years	Nikos Nikolaidis	Vicky Harris, Jenny Kitselli, Arhontisa Mavrakaki	Drama	1 Award in Greek State Film Awards
I Nostalgos (Η Νοσταλγός)	Eleni Alexandraki	Olia Lazaridou	Drama	1 Award in Greek State Film Awards
To Kako; Το κακό	Yorgos Noussias	Claudio Bolivar	Horror	
2006
Eduart	Angeliki Antoniou	Eshref Durmishi	Drama	Entered into the 29th Moscow International Film Festival; 9 Awards in Greek State Film Awards; Odysseus Award in London Greek Film Festival
2007
El Greco	Yannis Smaragdis	Nick Ashdon, Juan Diego Botto, Lakis Lazopoulos, Sotiris Moustakas	Biography	The third highest-grossing Greek film of all time 8 Awards in Greek State Film Awards; 1 Award in Goya Awards; 1 Award in Cairo International Film Festival
To Fili Tis Zois (Το φιλί της ζωής)	Nikos Zapatinas	Caterina Papoutsaki, Themos Anastasiadis	Comedy	
Alter Ego	Nikolas Papadimitropoulos	Sakis Rouvas	Drama	Most expensive Greek production of all time with a budget of €2.000.000 IMDb
2008
Slaves in Their Bonds (Σκλάβοι στα δεσμά τους)	Andonis Lykouresis	Giannis Fertis, Dimitra Matsouka, Akis Sakellariou	Drama season	10 Awards in Greek State Film Awards
Bank Bang	Vasilis Charalampopoulos		Comedy	1 Award in Greek State Film Awards
The Dust of Time	Theodoros Angelopoulos	Willem Dafoe	Drama	
Just Broke Up (Μόλις Χώρισα)	Vassilis Myrianthopoulos	Zeta Makrypoulia, Giannis Tsimitselis	Comedy	
I-4: Loafing and Camouflage (Ι4: Λούφα και Απαλλαγή)	Vassilis Katsikis	Giorgos Kimoulis, Thanasis Tsaltabasis, Haris Mavroudis, Petros Lagoutis	Comedy	
Athens Istanbul	Nikos Panayotopoulos		Road Movie	
2009
Dogtooth (Κυνόδοντας)	Yorgos Lanthimos	Christos Stergioglou, Michele Valley, Aggeliki Papoulia, Mary Tsoni, Christos Passalis, Anna Kalaitzidou	Drama	Prix Un Certain Regard at the 2009 Cannes Film Festival; Nominated for Best Foreign Language Film in Academy Awards; 5 Awards in Hellenic Film Academy Awards
Deep Soul (Ψυχή Βαθιά)	Pantelis Voulgaris	Victoria Haralabidou, Vangelis Mourikis	Historic Drama	2 Awards in Hellenic Film Academy Awards
Strella (Στρέλλα)	Panos H. Koutras	Mina Orphanou	Drama	4 Awards in Hellenic Film Academy Awards
Evil: In the Time of Heroes	Yorgos Noussias	Billy Zane	Horror	
Guilt	Vassilis Mazomenos	Nikos Arvanitis, Konstantinos Seiradakis, Yiannis Tsortekis	Horror	
