= List of Greek films of the 1990s =

A list of notable films produced in Greece in the 1990s.

== 1990s ==
Title	Director	Cast	Genre	Notes
1990
Singapore Sling (Singapore Sling: Ο Άνθρωπος που Αγάπησε ένα Πτώμα)	Nikos Nikolaidis	Meredyth Herold, Panos Thanassoulis, Michele Valley	Drama	3 Awards in Thessaloniki Film Festival
Love Under the Date-Tree	Stavros Tsiolis			
1991
Isyhes meres tou Avgoustou (Ήσυχες μέρες του Αυγούστου)	Pantelis Voulgaris	Thanassis Veggos, Aleka Paizi, Themis Bazaka	Drama	Entered into the 41st Berlin International Film Festival
Meteoro vima tou pelargou, To (Το μετέωρο βήμα του πελαργού)	Theodoros Angelopoulos	Marcello Mastroianni, Jeanne Moreau	Drama/Romance	Entered into the 1991 Cannes Film Festival
1992
Ante geia... (Άντε γεια...)	Yorgos Tsemperopoulos	Ketty Papanika, Alkis Kourkoulos	Romantic drama	
Crystal Nights (Κρυστάλλινες νύκτες)	Tonia Marketaki			Screened at the 1992 Cannes Film Festival
1993
From the Snow (Απ' το χιόνι)	Sotiris Goritsas	Gerasimos Skiadaresis	Drama	Golden Alexander in Thessaloniki International Film Festival; 2 Awards in Greek State Film Awards
Lefteris Dimakopoulos (Λευτέρης Δημακόπουλος)	Periklis Hoursoglou	Nikos Georgakis, Maria Skoula	Drama	4 Awards in Greek State Film Awards; Award of Greek Film Critics Association Awards
Pano kato ke plagios (Πάνω κάτω και πλαγίως)	Michael Cacoyannis	Irene Papas, Stratos Tzortzoglou, Panos Mihalopoulos, Yannis Bezos, Elda Panopoulou	Comedy	
1994
Telos Epohis (Τέλος εποχής)	Antonis Kokkinos	Kostas Kazanas, Dimosthenis Papadopoulos, Giorgos Pyrpassopoulos	Drama	5 Awards in Greek State Film Awards; Award of Greek Film Critics Association Awards
Jaguar (Ιαγουάρος)	Katerina Evangelakou			Entered into the 19th Moscow International Film Festival; 2 Awards in Greek State Film Awards
To koritsi me tis valitses (Το κορίτσι με τις βαλίτσες)	Nikos Nikolaidis	Lakis Lazopoulos, Meredyth Herold, Mirka Kalatzopoulou	Drama	
1995
Ulysses' Gaze (To Vlemma tou Odyssea, Το βλέμμα του Οδυσσέα)	Theo Angelopoulos	Harvey Keitel, Maia Morgenstern	War Drama	8 wins, including one at Cannes and 2 nominations; German/ UK/ Greek/ French/ Italian co-production
Akropol (Ακροπόλ)	Pantelis Voulgaris	Lefteris Voyatzis, Stavros Paravas, Konstantinos Tzoumas, Themis Bazaka, Sotiria Leonardou	Music Drama	
Days of Rage (Days of Rage)	Vassilis Mazomenos		Animation	Fantasporto; Belgrade Film Festival
1996
Apontes (Απόντες)	Nikos Grammatikos		Drama	4 Awards in Greek State Film Awards; Award of Greek Film Critics Association Awards
The Triumph of Time'' (The Triumph of Time)	Vassilis Mazomenos		Animation	Award in Greek State Film Awards; Fantasporto; Belgrade Film Festival
Biznes sta Valkania (Μπίζνες στα Βαλκάνια)	Vassilis Boudouris	Alexandros Logothetis, Daniela Nane	Comedy/Drama	
1997
Vasiliki (Βασιλική)	Vangelis Serdaris	Paschalis Tsarouhas, Tamila Koulieva	Drama	1 Award in Greek State Film Awards; Award of Greek Film Critics Association Awards; 1 Award in Cairo International Film Festival
Kyrios me ta gri, O (Ο κύριος με τα γκρι)	Periklis Hoursoglou	Yorgos Michalakopoulos, Eirini Inglesi	Drama	
1998
Eternity and a Day (Mia aioniotita kai mia mera, Μία Αιωνιότητα και μία Ημέρα)	Theo Angelopoulos	Bruno Ganz	Drama	Won the Palme d'Or at the 1998 Cannes Film Festival; 7 Awards in Greek State Film Awards
Apo tin akri tis polis (Από την άκρη της πόλης)	Constantinos Giannaris	Stathis Papadopoulos, Theodora Tzimou	Drama	2 Awards in Greek State Film Awards; Award of Greek Film Critics Association Awards
Shores of Twilight (Τα Ροδίνα Ακρογίαλια)	Efthymios Hatzis	Alexis Damianos, Stefanos Iatridis, Anna-Maria Papaharalambous, Maria Skoula, Mirto Alikaki, Despina Kourti, Dimitris Poulikakos, Evangelia Adreadaki, Tasos Palatzidis, Marianna Toli	Drama based on Alexandros Papdiamantis novella.	2 Award in Greek State Film Awards Nominated for Golden Saint George at the 21st Moscow International Film Festival Nominated for best film in the Ghent International Film Festival Nominated for best film in the Seattle International Film Festival Selected international competition art Mar del Plata Film Festiva Nominated for best film in the Haifa International Film Festival
Ola einai dromos (Όλα είναι δρόμος)	Pantelis Voulgaris	Thanassis Veggos, Giorgos Armenis	Drama	2 Awards in Greek State Film Awards
Black Out p.s. Red Out	Menelaos Karamaghiolis			Entered into the 21st Moscow International Film Festival; 4 Awards in Greek State Film Awards
Money, A Mythology of Darkness	Vassilis Mazomenos		3D Animation	Award in Greek State Film Awards; Special Jury Award in Fantasporto; Nomination for the Best European Fantasy Film; Sitges Film Festival; Puchon International Fantastic Film Festival
1999
Peppermint	Costas Kapakas	Georges Corraface, Anny Loulou	Romantic comedy	9 Awards in Greek State Film Awards
Safe Sex	Michalis Reppas, Thanasis Papathanasiou	Mina Adamaki, Alexandros Antonopoulos, Evelina Papoulia	Comedy	
Attack of the Giant Moussaka, The (I Epithesi tou gigantiaiou mousaka, Η επίθεση του γιγαντιαίου μουσακά)	Panos H. Koutras	Giannis Aggelakas, Themis Bazaka	Comedy	
See You in Hell, My Darling (Θα σε Δω στην Κόλαση Αγάπη μου)	Nikos Nikolaidis	Vicky Harris, Valeria Christodoulidou, Paschalis Tsarouhas	Drama	
