= List of Greek submissions for the Academy Award for Best International Feature Film =

Best International Feature Film submissions from Greece

Highlights
- Debut: 1957
- Submissions: 46
- Nominations: 5
- Oscar winners: none

Greece has submitted films for the Academy Award for Best International Feature Film. (Note: The category was previously named the Academy Award for Best Foreign Language Film, but this was changed to the Academy Award for Best International Feature Film in April 2019, after the Academy deemed the word "Foreign" to be outdated.) The award is handed out annually by the United States Academy of Motion Picture Arts and Sciences to a feature-length motion picture produced outside the United States that contains primarily non-English dialogue. It was created for the 1956 Academy Awards, in which a competitive Academy Award of Merit, known as the Best Foreign Language Film Award, was created for non-English speaking films, and has been given annually since.

As of 2026, Greece has been nominated five times. It last nomination was Dogtooth (2010).

== Submissions ==
The Academy of Motion Picture Arts and Sciences has invited the film industries of various countries to submit their best film for the Academy Award for Best International Feature Film since 1956. The International Feature Film Committee oversees the process and reviews all the submitted films. Following this, they vote via secret ballot to determine the five nominees for the award.

In the 1990s, Greek film law stipulated that the winner of the Greek Film Competition at the Thessaloniki Film Festival would represent Greece at the Oscars the following year. After Greek films that were mostly in English (and thus ineligible for the Foreign Language Film award) won the award in 2005 and 2007, Greece decided to revise the selection process. Beginning in 2008, the Greek submission is determined by an ad hoc committee appointed under the auspices of the Greek Ministry of Culture. The first film to be selected under the new rules was Correction, since El Greco contained too much English to qualify.

In 2004, Greek film Nyfes was ruled ineligible for being in English. The country was allowed to change its submission, selecting A Touch of Spice.

All the submissions are primary in Greek. Below is a list of the films that have been submitted by Greece for review by the Academy for the award by the year of the submission and the respective Academy Award ceremony.

Year (Ceremony)	Film title used in nomination	Original title	Director	Result
1957 (30th)	The Lagoon of Desire	Η λίμνη των πόθων	Giorgos Zervos	Not nominated
1962 (35th)	Electra	Ηλέκτρα	Michael Cacoyannis	Nominated
1963 (36th)	The Red Lanterns	Τα κόκκινα φανάρια	Vasilis Georgiadis	Nominated
1964 (37th)	Treason	Προδοσία	Kostas Manoussakis	Not nominated
1965 (38th)	Blood on the Land	Το χώμα βάφτηκε κόκκινο	Vasilis Georgiadis	Nominated
1966 (39th)	Queen of Clubs	Ντάμα σπαθί	George Skalenakis	Not nominated
1968 (41st)	Imperiale	Βυζαντινή Ραψωδία	George Skalenakis	Not nominated
1969 (42nd)	Girls in the Sun	Κορίτσια στον Ήλιο	Vasilis Georgiadis	Not nominated
1975 (48th)	The Travelling Players	Ο Θίασος	Theo Angelopoulos	Not nominated
1977 (50th)	Iphigenia	Iφιγένεια	Michael Cacoyannis	Nominated
1981 (54th)	The Man with the Carnation	Ο άνθρωπος με το γαρίφαλο	Nikos Tzimas	Not nominated
1982 (55th)	Angel	Άγγελος	Giorgos Katakouzinos	Not nominated
1987 (60th)	Theofilos	Θεόφιλος	Lakis Papastathis	Not nominated
1988 (61st)	In the Shadow of Fear	Στη σκιά του τρόμου	Yiorgos Karypidis	Not nominated
1989 (62nd)	Landscape in the Mist	Τοπίο στην ομίχλη	Theo Angelopoulos	Not nominated
1990 (63rd)	Love Under the Date-Tree	Έρωτας στη χουρμαδιά	Stavros Tsiolis	Not nominated
1995 (68th)	Ulysses' Gaze	Το Βλέμμα του Οδυσσέα	Theo Angelopoulos	Not nominated
1997 (70th)	Slaughter of the Cock	Η Σφαγή του Κόκορα	Andreas Pantzis	Not nominated
1998 (71st)	Eternity and a Day	Μια αιωνιότητα και μια μέρα	Theo Angelopoulos	Not nominated
1999 (72nd)	From the Edge of the City	Από την άκρη της πόλης	Constantinos Giannaris	Not nominated
2000 (73rd)	Peppermint		Costas Kapakas	Not nominated
2001 (74th)	In Good Company	Ένας κι ένας	Nikos Zapatinas	Not nominated
2002 (75th)	The Only Journey of His Life	Το μόνον της ζωής του ταξείδιον	Lakis Papastathis	Not nominated
2003 (76th)	Think It Over	Θα το Μετανιώσεις	Katerina Evangelakou	Not nominated
2004 (77th)	A Touch of Spice	Πολίτικη Κουζίνα	Tassos Boulmetis	Not nominated
2006 (79th)	Chariton's Choir	Η χωρωδία του Χαρίτωνα	Grigoris Karantinakis	Not nominated
2007 (80th)	Eduart		Angeliki Antoniou	Not nominated
2008 (81st)	Correction	Διόρθωση	Thanos Anastopoulos	Not nominated
2009 (82nd)	Slaves in Their Bonds	Οι Σκλάβοι στα Δεσμά τους	Adonis Lykouresis	Not nominated
2010 (83rd)	Dogtooth	Κυνόδοντας	Yorgos Lanthimos	Nominated
2011 (84th)	Attenberg		Athina Rachel Tsangari	Not nominated
2012 (85th)	Unfair World	Άδικος Κόσμος	Filippos Tsitos	Not nominated
2013 (86th)	Boy Eating the Bird's Food	Το Αγόρι Τρώει το Φαγητό του Πουλιού	Ektoras Lygizos	Not nominated
2014 (87th)	Little England	Μικρά Αγγλία	Pantelis Voulgaris	Not nominated
2015 (88th)	Xenia	Ξενία	Panos H. Koutras	Not nominated
2016 (89th)	Chevalier		Athina Rachel Tsangari	Not nominated
2017 (90th)	Amerika Square	Amerika Square	Yannis Sakaridis	Not nominated
2018 (91st)	Polyxeni	Πολυξένη	Dora Masklavanou	Not nominated
2019 (92nd)	When Tomatoes Met Wagner	Όταν ο Βάγκνερ Συνάντησε τις Ντομάτες	Marianna Economou	Not nominated
2020 (93rd)	Apples	Μήλα	Christos Nikou	Not nominated
2021 (94th)	Digger		Georgis Grigorakis	Not nominated
2022 (95th)	Magnetic Fields	Μαγνητικά Πεδία	Yorgos Gousis	Not nominated
2023 (96th)	Behind the Haystacks	Πίσω από τις θημωνιές	Asimina Proedrou	Not nominated
2024 (97th)	Murderess	Φόνισσα	Eva Nathena	Not nominated
2025 (98th)	Arcadia	Αρκάντια	Yorgos Zois	Not nominated
2026 (99th)	Broken Vein	Σπασμένη φλέβα	Yannis Economides	Pending

== 2024 Greek Academy Awards Submission Scandal ==
In August 2024, a significant controversy erupted within the Greek film industry regarding the selection process for the country's submission to the 97th Academy Awards for Best International Feature Film. The scandal involved accusations of interference by the Greek Culture Ministry in the selection committee's work, leading to widespread protests from filmmakers and industry organizations.

The controversy began when acclaimed Greek filmmaker Vasilis Kekatos, a winner of the Short Film Palme d'Or at the 2019 Cannes Film Festival, publicly claimed on Facebook that he and other members of the selection committee had been abruptly replaced by the ministry. Despite having been provided with codes and passwords to watch and rate the submitted Greek films, Kekatos alleged that the ministry had intervened to appoint a different committee. The Greek Culture Ministry responded to these allegations by denying that Kekatos and the other individuals mentioned in his post were ever officially chosen for the committee. The ministry asserted that the official committee members had been announced through its official channels on August 13, 2024.

The scandal had a significant impact on the submission process. In protest of the ministry's actions, 21 out of 26 films that had submitted their files withdrew from consideration, and two members of the newly appointed committee resigned. Additionally, local film organizations, unions, and the Hellenic Film Academy issued public statements demanding an investigation into the matter.

Furthermore, one of the newly appointed committee members, film critic Dimitris Danikas, faced additional scrutiny, as he had been expelled from the Hellenic Film Academy due to publications deemed inconsistent with the Academy's moral standards.

Following these events, Greek Deputy Culture Minister Jason Fotilas held a press conference on August 22, 2024, where he claimed that a Culture Ministry employee had taken the initiative to contact Kekatos and the other committee members on an unofficial list from the ministry’s Directorate of Cinema and Performance Arts, before the Deputy Minister had officially accepted it.

According to Fotilas, “the employee apologized and said he acted out of overzealousness so that the procedures would run faster and we could save time," since the Academy’s August 15, 2024, deadline was fast approaching, and the Deputy Minister’s official approval was only a formality.

Although several media questions remained unanswered during the press conference, Fotilas stated that he was open to discussions with the Hellenic Film Academy to find a solution that would secure the validity of the procedure, even though the Academy had complained that it had been trying for months to get an appointment with him to discuss the current selection process and other industry issues.

Following the press conference, the Academy issued a statement asking the Deputy Culture Minister to consider the complete cancellation of the procedure and the non-submission of a proposal by our country for this year's Academy Award for Best International Feature Film.

The 2024 Greek Academy Awards submission scandal, which garnered international film media coverage, raised concerns about the transparency and fairness of the selection process. Critics argued that the government's involvement had compromised the independence of the committee and undermined the credibility of the Greek submission. The controversy also highlighted the need for reforms to ensure a more equitable and transparent system for future submissions.

== See also ==
- List of Academy Award winners and nominees for Best International Feature Film
- List of Academy Award-winning foreign language films
- List of Greek award-winning films in International Film Festivals
- Cinema of Greece
