= Greek State Film Awards =

- Location: Thessaloniki, Greece
- Predecessor: Thessaloniki Festival of Greek Cinema
- Founded: 1992
- Disestablished: 2008
- Successor: Hellenic Film Academy Awards
- Language: Greek

The Greek State Film Awards (Greek: Κρατικά Βραβεία Κινηματογράφου) was a part of Thessaloniki International Film Festival concerning exclusively Greek movies. It was one of the most important events in Greek cinema, from its institution in 1992 until 2008.

Until 1991, only Greek movies participated in the Thessaloniki Film Festival. Since 1992 the festival became international and a separate award was instituted for Greek movies. At first the new award was named State Film Awards and later State Film Quality Awards (Κρατικά Κινηματογραφικά Βραβεία Ποιότητας). It was given out by the Greek Ministry of Culture. Apart from the best film award there were awards in other categories such as the best actor, actress, best director etc.

In 2009, during the 50th Thessaloniki Festival, the Greek filmmakers decided to boycott the awards. The awards were subsequently abolished by a bill of the Ministry of Culture. It has since been replaced by the Hellenic Film Academy Awards.

== Best film award ==
=== Greek state quality film awards (1998-2008) ===
Season	Best Movie	Second Best Movie	Third Best Movie	Sources
2008	Without	Slaves in Their Bonds	Well Kept Secrets: Athanasia	
2007	El Greco	Uranya	Diorthosi	
2006	Eduart	The Guardian's Son	Pandora	
2005	Chariton's Choir	The Wake	Omiros	
2004	Brides	Rakushka	Testosterone	
2003	A Touch of Spice	Sto Hani	Matia Apo Nyhta	
2002	Think It Over	Hard Goodbyes: My Father	The King	
2001	The Only Journey of His Life	The Seventh Sun of Love	To Tama	
2000	In Good Company	Edge of Night	Efimeri Poli	
1999	Peppermint	The Canary Yellow Bicycle	The Four Seasons of The Law	
1998	Eternity and a Day	From the Edge of the City	Black Out	

=== Greek state film awards (1992-1997) ===
Season	Best Movie	Sources
1997	Hamenes Nyhtes, Mirupafshim	
1996	I Sfagi tou Kokkora, Apontes	
1995	O Tsalapetinos Tou Wyoming	
1994	End of an Era	
1993	Lefteris Dimakopoulos, From the Snow	
1992	Byron, balanta gia enan daimonismeno	

== Best director ==
Season	Best Director	Sources
2008	Adonis Lykouresis for Slaves in Their Bonds	
2007	Giannis Smaragdis for El Greco	
2006	Angeliki Antoniou for Eduart	
2005	Constantine Giannaris for Omiros	
2004	Foteini Siskopoulou for Rakushka	
2003	Tasos Boulmetis for A Touch of Spice	
2002	Katerina Evaggelakou for Think It Over; Nikos Nikolaidis for The Loser Takes It All	
2001	Vangelis Serntaris for The Seventh Sun of Love	
2000	Nikos Zappatinas for In Good Company	
1999	Dimos Avdeliodis for The Four Seasons of The Law	
1998	Theodoros Angelopoulos for Eternity and a Day	
1997	Angeliki Antoniou for Hamenes Nyhtes	
1996	Andreas Pantzis for I Sfagi tou Kokkora; Nikos Grammatikos for Apontes	
1995	Christos Siopahas for To ftero tis mygas	
1994	Panagiotis Karkanevatos for Metaichmio	
1993	Kostas Aristopoulos for Enastros Tholos	
1992	Stavros Tsiolis and Christos Vakalopoulos for Please Women Don`t Cry	

== Best screenplay ==
Season	Best Screenplay	Sources
2008	Ioannis Maroudas, Adonis Lykouresis and Maria Vardaka for Slaves in Their Bonds	
2007	Thanos Anastopoulos and Vasilis Raisis for Diorthosi; Kostas Kappakas for Uranya	
2006	Angeliki Antoniou for Eduart	
2005	Makis Papadimitratos for Tsiou	
2004	Foteini Siskopoulou for Rakushka	
2003	Tasos Boulmetis for A Touch of Spice	
2002	Katerina Evaggelakou for Think It Over	
2001	Vangelis Serntaris for The Seventh Sun of Love	
2000	Nikos Zappatinas for In Good Company	
1999	Kostas Kappakas for Peppermint	
1998	Theodoros Angelopoulos for Eternity and a Day	
1997	Angeliki Antoniou and Kritona Kalaintzidi for Hamenes Nyhtes	
1996	Nikos Grammatikos and Nikos Panagiotopoulos for Apontes	
1995	Foteini Siskopoulou and Prodromos Savvidis for I zoi enamisi hiliariko Vasiliki Iliopoulou for Me mia kravgi	
1994	Antonis Kokkinos and Alexandros Kakkavas for End of an Era; Roula Georgakopoulou and Katerina Evaggelakou for Iagouaros	
1993	Sotiris Goritsas for From the Snow	
1992	Stavros Tsiolis and Christos Vakalopoulos for Please Women Don`t Cry	

== Best actor ==
Season	Best Actor	Sources
2008	Giannis Fertis for Slaves in Their Bonds	
2007	Giorgos Symeonidis for Diorthosi	
2006	Vasilis Charalampopoulos for Pente lepta akoma	
2005	Vangelis Mourikis for The Wake	
2004	Dimitris Liakopoulos for Testosterone	
2003	Marios Ioannou for Kalabush	
2002	Vangelis Mourikis for The King	
2001	George Corraface for To Tama	
2000	Nikos Kalogeropoulos for In Good Company	
1999	Dimitris Alexandris for The Canary Yellow Bicycle	
1998	Giorgos Armenis for It's a Long Road	
1997	Lazaros Andreou for Ta hrysa mila ton esperidon	
1996	George Corraface for I sfagi tou kokkora	
1995	Dimitris Alexandris for Me mia kravgi	
1994	Stavros Zalmas for To Harama	
1993	Akis Sakellariou for I epohi ton dolofonon	
1992	Manos Vakousis for Byron, balanta gia enan daimonismeno	

== Best actress ==
Season	Best Actress	Sources
2008	Evi Saoulidou for Without	
2007	Loukia Michalopoulou for Walsh Sentimentale	
2006	Theodora Tzimou for Pandora	
2005	Rania Oikonomidou for Galazio Forema	
2004	Victoria Haralampidou for Brides	
2003	Vangelio Andreadaki for Matia apo nyhta	
2002	Mania Papadimitriou for Think It Over	
2001	Maria Zormpa for Sose me	
2000	Athena Maximou for Edge of Night	
1999	Any Loulou for Peppermint	
1998	Myrto Alikaki for Black Out	
1997	Eirini Inglesi for O kyrios me ta gkri Jasmin Tabatabai for Hamenes Nyhtes	
1996	Valeria Golino for I sfagi tou kokkora	
1995	Dimitra Hatoupi for I zoi enamisi hiliariko	
1994	Niki Vosniakou and Ivoni Maltezou for Iagouaros	
1993	Eva Kotamanidou for Zoi Harisameni	
1992	Tania Trypi for Kristallines Nyhtes	

== Best supporting actor ==
Season	Best Supporting Actor	Sources
2008	Christos Loulis for Slaves in Their Bonds	
2007	Manolis Mavromatakis for Uranya	
2006	Christos Stergioglou for Ores koinis isihias	
2005	Nikos Georgakis for Lioumpi	
2004	Vangelis Mourikis for Rakushka	
2003	Alexandros Logothetis for Gamilia Narki; Giorgos Morogiannis for Sto Hani	
2002	Minas Hatzisavvas for Lilly's Story	
2001	Spyros Stavrinidis for Aionios Foititis	
2000	Ieroklis Michailidis for Backdoor	
1999	Tasos Palantzidis for Peppermint	
1998	Lazaros Georgakopoulos for Oi arithmimenoi Dimitris Thermos for Ta kokkina akrogialia	
1997	Giorgos Voltatzis for No Budget Story	
1996	Nikos Georgakis, Vangelis Mourikis, Kostas Staridas, Aimilios Heilakis, Giorgos Evgenikos and Tasos Nousias for Apontes	
1995	Akis Sakellariou for I zoi enamisi hiliariko	
1994	Christos Kalavrouzos for Metaichmio	
1993	Giorgos Velentzas for Zoi Harisameni	
1992	Dimitris Poulikakos for Donousa	

== Best supporting actress ==
Season	Best Supporting Actress	Sources
2008	Dimitra Matsouka for Slaves in Their Bonds	
2007	Meni Konstantinidou for Straight Story	
2006	Maria Nafpliotou for Psychi sto stoma	
2005	Maria Zormpa for Glykia Mnimi	
2004	Evi Saoulidou for Brides	
2003	Ekavi Ntouma for Matia Apo Nyhta	
2002	Ivoni Maltezou for Think It Over	
2001	Themis Bazaka for Oi akrovates tou kipou	
2000	Zoi Nalmpanti for Edge of Night	
1999	Dimitra Hatoupi for Homa kai Nero	
1998	Eleni Gerasimidou for Eternity and a Day	
1997	Rania Oikonomidou for O kyrios me ta gkri	
1996	Liona Kourtaki for Treis epohes	
1995	Eva Karampatsou for Magemenoi	
1994	Pengy Trikalioti for End of an Era	
1993	Betty Livanou for I epohi ton dolofonon	
1992	Vera Sotnikova for Byron, balanta gia enan daimonismeno	

== Best music ==
Season	Best Music	Sources
2008	Minos Matsas for Slaves in Their Bonds	
2007	Panagiotis Kalantzopoulos for Uranya; Vangelis Papathanassiou for El Greco	
2006	Minos Matsas and Konstantinos Christidis for Eduart	
2005	Nikos Papazoglou for I Nostalgos	
2004	Stamatis Spanoudakis for Brides	
2003	Evanthia Remboutsika for A Touch of Spice	
2002	Nikos Mamangakis for Lilly's Story	
2001	Giorgos Papadakis for The Only Journey of His Life	
2000	Stamatis Kraounakis for Edge of Night	
1999	Panagiotis Kalantzopoulos for Peppermint	
1998	Eleni Karaindrou for Eternity and a Day	
1997	Giorgos Tsagkaris for Vasiliki	
1996	Kostas Zevgadelis for Prin to telos tou kosmou	
1995	Dimitris Papadimitriou for I zoi enamisi hiliariko	
1994	Vangelis Katsoulis for Esti oun Tragodia and Nikos Kypourgos for Metaichmio	
1993	Dimitris Papadimitriou for Zoi Harisameni	
1992	Nikos Kypourgos for Pethameno Liker	

== Best cinematography ==
Season	Best cinematography	Sources
2008	Ilias Konstantakopoulos for Without	
2007	Aris Stavrou and Nikos Smaragdis for El Greco	
2006	Aris Stavrou for Dying in Athens	
2005	Andreas Siganos for Galazio Forema	
2004	Giorgos Arvanitis for Brides	
2003	Takis Zervoulkis for A Touch of Spice	
2002	Kostas Gkikas for The Loser Takes It All	
2001	Giannis Daskalothanasis for The Only Journey of His Life	
2000	Stamatis Giannoulis for Efimeri Poli	
1999	Aris Stavrou for O Vissinokipos	
1998	Nikos Kavoukidis for Oi Fotografoi	
1997	Aris Stavrou for Avrio tha Xeroume	
1996	Katerina Maragkoudaki for Prin to Telos tou Kosmou	
1995	Lefteris Pavlopoulos for oi Magemenoi	
1994	Giorgos Argyroiliopoulos for O Kipos tou Theou	
1993	Stamatis Giannoulis for Lefteris Dimakopoulos	
1992	Nikos Kavoukidis for Bayron	

== Best editing ==
Season	Best editing	Sources
2008	Giorgos Triantafyllou for Without	
2007	Giannis Tsitsopoulos for El Greco	
2006	Takis Giannelos for Eduart	
2005	Giannis Tsitsopoulos for Galazio Forema	
2004	Takis Giannopoulos for the Brides	
2003	Giorgos Mavropsalidis for A Touch of Spice	
2002	Alexis Pezas for Para Triha Para Ligo Para Ponto	
2001	Takis Koumoundouros for The Seventh Sun of Love	
2000	Giorgos Triantafyllou for Efimeri Poli	
1999	Takis Giannopoulos for Peppermint	
1998	Takis Giannopoulos for Black Out	
1997	Giorgos Triantafyllou for Ta Hrysa Mila ton Esperidon	
1996	Ioanna Spiliopoulou for Mi Mou Aptou	
1995	Panos Papakyriakopoulos for To Ftero Tis Mygas	
1994	Ioanna Spiliopoulou for End of an Era	
1993	Despoina Maroulakou for Enastros Tholos	
1992	Takis Giannopoulos for Bayron	

== Best production design ==
Season	Best production design	Sources
2008	Konstantinos Zamanis for Slaves in Their Bonds	
2007	Damianos Zafeiris for El Greco	
2006	Ioulia Stavridou for Eduart	
2005	Marie-Louise Bartholomew and Nikos Politis for The Zero Years and Sweet Memory	
2004	Dimitris Katsikis for Brides	
2003	Olga Leontiadou for A Touch of Spice	
2002	Aglaia Zoiopoulou for The King	
2001	Giorgos Georgiou for The Only Journey of His Life	
2000	Georgios Andritsogiannos for The Edge of Night	
1999	Dionysis Fotopoulos for Vissinokipos	
1998	Giorgos Ziakas and Kostas Dimitriadis for Eternity and a Day	
1997	Flora Koutsoumani and Sofia Papahrystou for Ta Hrysa Mila ton Esperidon	
1996	Agni Doutsi for Prin to Telos tou Kosmou	
1995	Anastasia Arseni for Oi Ores	
1994	Sofia Zoumperi for O Kipos tou theou	
1993	Anastasia Arseni for Lefteris Dimakopoulos	
1992	Constantine Forentensko for Bayron	

== Best costumes design ==
Season	Best costumes design	Sources
2008	Bianka Nikolareizi for Slaves in Their Bonds	
2007	Eva Nathena for Uranya	
2006	Ioulia Stavridou for Eduart	
2005	Erika Evaggelidou for Galazio Forema	
2004	Damianos Zareifis and Eva Nathena for Brides	
2003	Eva Nathena for Oi Theatrines	
2002	Miranta Theodoridou and Agni Doutsi for Alexandria	
2001	Giorgos Georgiou for The Only Journey of His Life	
2000	Damianos Zareifis for In Good Company	
1999	Dionysis Fotopoulos for O Vissinokipos	
1998	Giorgos Patsas for Eternity and a Day	
1997	Flora Koutsoumani and Sofia Papahrystou for Ta Hrysa Mila ton Esperidon	
1996	Maro Seirli for Treis Epohes	
1995	Anastasia Arseni for oi Ores	
1994	Sofia Zoumperi for O Kipos tou Theou	
1993	not given	
1992	Giorgos Patsas for Krystalines Nyhtes	

== Best sound ==
Season	Best sound	Sources
2008	Ilias Bougioukos for Slaves in Their Bonds	
2007	Marinos Athanasopoulos for El Greco	
2006	Nikos Papadimitriou for Eduart	
2005	Marinos Athanasopoulos for Chariton's Choir	
2004	Nikos Papadimitriou and Thymios Koliokousis for Brides	
2003	Dimitris Athanasopoulos for A Touch of Spice	
2002	Antonis Samaras for The King	
2001	Nikos Papadimitriou for The Only Journey of His Life	
2000	Marinos Athanasopoulos for Edge of Night	
1999	Marinos Athanasopoulos for Peppermint	
1998	Marinos Athanasopoulos for Black Out	
1997	Dimitris Athanasopoulos for Avrio Tha Xeroume	
1996	Nikos Papadimitriou for Pros tin Eleftheria	
1995	Marinos Athanasopoulos for O Tsalapetinos tou Wyomine	
1994	Nikos Papadimitriou for End of an Era	
1993	Dimitris Galanopoulos for Aspro kokkino	
1992	Thanasis Arvanitis for Bayron	

== Best make up ==
Season	Best make up	Sources
2008	Fani Alexaki for Without	
2007	Argyro Kouroupou for El Greco	
2006	Fani Alexaki for Eduart	
2005	Fani Alexaki for Galazio Forema	
2004	Fani Alexaki for Brides	
2003	Fani Alexaki for Oi Theatrines	
2002	Fani Alexaki for Think it Over	
2001	Evi Zafeiropoulou for The Only Journey of His Life	
2000	Katerina Varthalitou for In Good Company	
1999	Theano Kapnia for Peppermint	
1998	Fani Alexaki for It's a Long Road	
1997	Argyro Kouroupou for Avrio Tha Xeroume	
1996	not given	
1995	not given	
1994	Lila Kosifidou, Sofia Zoumperi and Alexandra Venieri	
1993	not given	
1992	not given	

== See also ==
- Thessaloniki Festival of Greek Cinema
- Hellenic Film Academy Awards
- Greek Film Critics Association Awards
