= Elena Penga =

Greek playwright and director

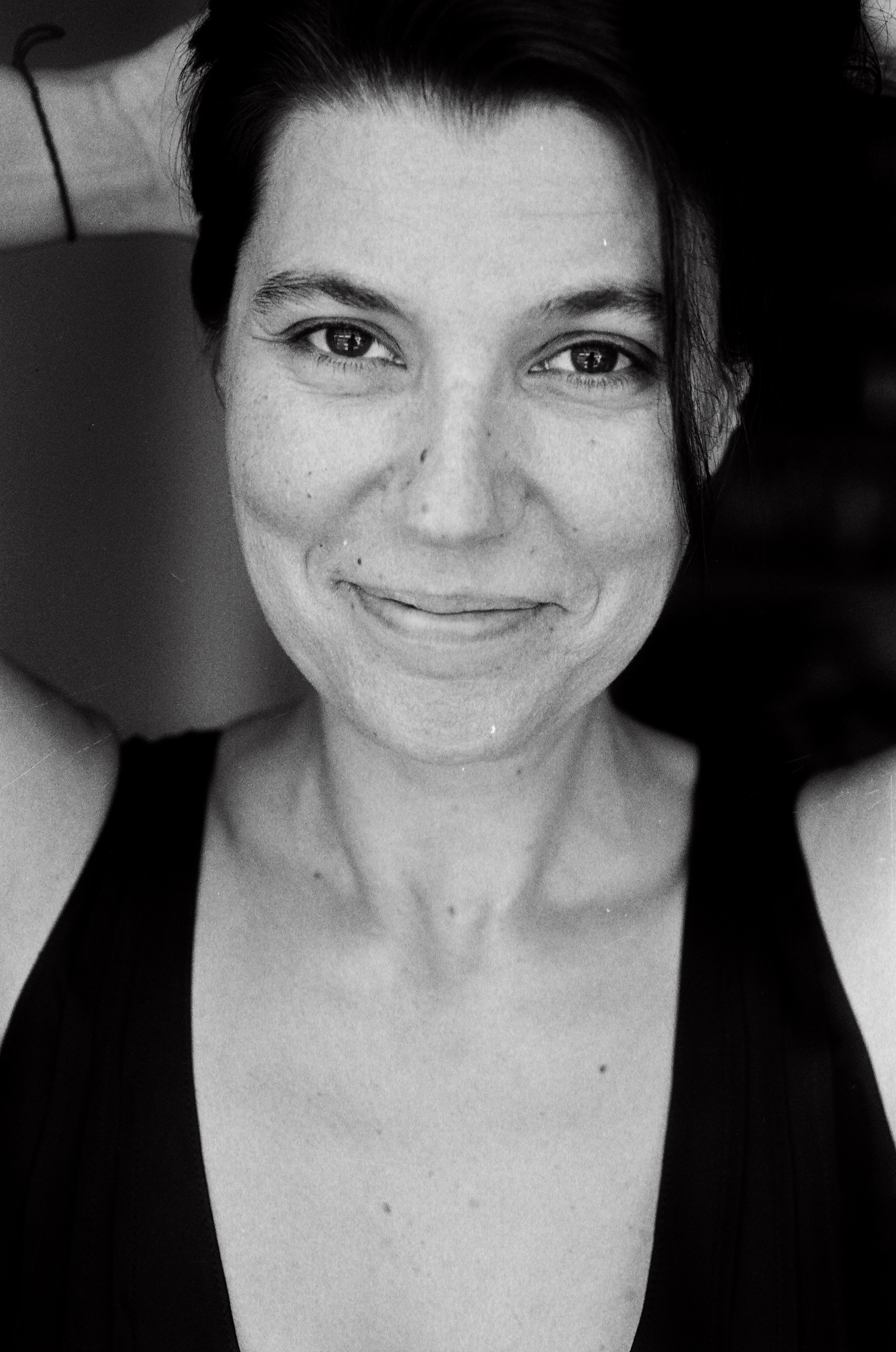
Elena Penga

Elena Penga (Greek: Έλενα Πέγκα; born c. 1966) is a Greek playwright, poet, fiction writer, and stage director.

Penga attended college and graduate school in the United States and staged her first plays in New York’s off-off Broadway scene before returning to Greece in the 1990s. Her plays have been produced at the National Theatre of Greece, National Theatre of Northern Greece, the Athens Festival and Delphi among many other theaters. Her work has been widely translated and performed in the US, Europe and the middle east. Her book Tight Belts and Other Skin (Agra, 2012) received the Ourani Prize of The Greek Academy of Letters and has been translated into Swedish and English. She is a co-author of the screenplay for the 2001 film adaptation of The Only Journey of His Life, about the Greek short-story writer Giorgios Vizyenos, which won the best film award in the Greek State Film Awards.

== Early life ==
Penga was born in Thessaloniki. She attended college in the United States, earning a bachelor's degree in philosophy and theater at Wesleyan University and a master's degree in scriptwriting at the University of Southern California. She returned to Greece in the early 1990s.

== Style and themes ==
Penga's work was described as dark and poetic by Cosmopoliti. Penga writes about the everyday aspects of politics and explores how individuals feel the repercussions of violence on a large scale. Her dramatic writing investigates issues of human existence, and explores the metaphysical and philosophical dimensions that present themselves in the dull, sometimes mundane lives of ordinary people. Her writing reflects contemporary Greek influences.

David Wallace of The New Yorker, in his review of the anthology Austerity Measures- The New Greek Poetry, writes:

Greece’s debt is a different kind of catastrophe, one that occurs in slow motion: its mechanisms are abstract and impersonal, although the consequences are very real for those who rely on government institutions. These strictures insinuate themselves into the ambience of everyday life and language, something that poets can observe with careful attention. Here, for instance, is the poet Elena Penga (in Van Dyck’s translation) describing a menace in plain sight:

The cherry trees in the neighbor’s yard haven’t had fruit for years. Four men enter carrying sticks. They enter the neighbor’s yard along with the rain. They’ve come to discipline the trees and chop them down if they don’t blossom. I watch the men hit the trees. I watch the rain hit the men.

A few unadorned sentences weave together several ideas: the sense of failed growth, the coercion that upholds the rule of efficiency, the passivity of the onlooker. Are the men from the government or from a corporation? It seems appropriate that we don’t know. This ordinary violence doesn’t need to be spelled out, it seems to say—it’s right in front of us if we’re merely observant enough to record it.

== Plays ==
Most of her plays have been published in Greek.

- Πορνοστάρ – Η αόρατη βιομηχανία του σεξ, (Pornstar: The Invisible Sex Industry) 2018. Produced by the Athens and Epidavros Festival in 2018.
- Γυναίκα και Λύκος - Woman and Wolf, 2014. Presented at the Municipal Theater of Peireus.
- Narcissus, 2011
- Phaedra Or Alcestis- Love Stories, 2007. Presented at the European Cultural Center of Delphi.
- Who are our new friends?, 2006. Produced at New Friends by the National Theater of Northern Greece.
- Nelly’s takes her dog out for a walk, 2003
- When the Go-Go Dancers dance, 2002
- 3-0-1 TRANSPORTS, 2000
- Emperor’s New Clothes, based on Andersen’s fairytale, 1999
- Waltz Excitation, 1998
- Kaethe Kollwitz presents a brief history of modern art, 1995
- Gorky’s Wife, 1995
- A king listens, based on a short story by Italo Calvino, 1994
- The Greek Alien & Poisons of the Sea, 1993
- 6 Jealous Numbers, based on Othello by Shakespeare, 1992
- Don Surrealism, one-act, 1991

== Fiction and poetry ==
- ΑΘΗΝΑ-ΔΕΛΧΙ-ΑΘΗΝΑ (Athens-Delhi-Athens), novel (Agra, 2019)
- ΣΦΙΧΤΕΣ ΖΩΝΕΣ ΚΑΙ ΑΛΛΑ ΔΕΡΜΑΤΑ (Tight Belts and Other Skins), novella (Agra, 2011) (2012 Literary Award of the Kostas and Eleni Ouranis Foundation)
- ΣΚΟΥΩΣ - ΣΤΙΓΜΕΣ ΑΝΤΡΙΚΕΣ ΚΑΙ ΓΥΝΑΙΚΕΙΕΣ (Squash - Moments Male and Female), novella (1997)
- ΑΥΤΗ ΘΕΡΙΝΗ (She Summer Like), novella (Agra, 1986)

Penga's poetry has been anthologized in, among others, Austerity Measures, translated into English by Karen Van Dyck. Austerity Measures also includes short prose from her collection Tight Belts and Other Skin, published by Penguin, 2016, and also published by New York Review of Books, 2017 She is also included in the English anthology The Penguin Book of The Prose Poem: From Baudelaire to Anne Carson, Penguin UK, 2018

Her short story, "The Untrodden" ("Το Αβατον"), Dalkey Archive Press (2016), translated into English by Karen Van Dyck, was included in the book Best European Fiction 2017.
