= The Other Me =

The Other Me may refer to:

- The Other Me (2000 film), a 2000 Disney Channel Original Movie
- The Other Me (2016 film), a 2016 Greek film directed by Sotiris Tsafoulias
- The Other Me (2022 film), a 2022 American film directed by Giga Agladze
- "The Other Me" (song), by Paul McCartney
