= Greek Film Critics Association Awards =

The Greek Film Critics Association Awards is one of the most important and oldest annual awards of the Greek Cinema. The awards are given out by Greek Film Critics Association and began in 1976. The PEKK gives out the awards during Thessaloniki Festival.

== Best film award ==
Year	Movie	original title	Director
2015	Tetarti 04:45	Τετάρτη 4:15	Alexis Alexiou
2014	Stratos	Το Μικρό Ψάρι	Yannis Economidis
2013	The Eternal Return of Antonis Paraskevas	Η Αιώνια Επιστροφή	Elina Psikou
2012	not given		
2011	The City of Children	Η Πόλη των Παιδιών	Giorgos Gikapeppas
2010	not given		
2009	not given		
2008	The night Fernanto Pessoa met Konstantinos Kavafi	Τη νύχτα που ο Φερνάντο Πεσσόα συνάντησε τον Κωνσταντίνο Καβάφη	Stelios Charalampopoulos
2007	I metamorfosi	Η μεταμόρφωση	Costas Sfikas
2006	I psychi sto stoma	Η ψυχή στο στόμα	Yannis Economidis
2005	Buzz	Buzz	Spyros Taraviras
2004	Real Life; CCTV	Αληθινή ζωή CCTV	Panos H. Koutras; Vasilis Katsikis
2003	Matchbox	Σπιρτόκουτο	Yannis Economides
2002	Hard Goodbyes: My Father	Δύσκολοι αποχαιρετισμοί: Ο μπαμπάς μου	Penny Panagiotopoulou
2001	Dekapentavgoustos; Still Looking for Morphine	Δεκαπεντάυγουστος; Πες στη μορφίνη ακόμα την ψάχνω	Constantine Giannaris; Yannis Fagkras
2000	Agelastos Petra; The House of Cain; Kleistoi Dromoi (special mention)	Αγέλαστος πέτρα Το σπίτι του Κάιν; Κλειστοί δρόμοι	Filippos Koutsaftis; Christos Karakepelis; Stavros Ioannou
1999	The Four Seasons of the Law	Η εαρινή σύναξις των αγροφυλάκων	Dimos Avdeliodis
1998	From the Edge of the City	Από την άκρη της πόλης	Constantine Giannaris
1997	Vasiliki; No Budget Story(special mention); The golden apples of Esperides(special mention)	Βασιλική; No Budget Story; Τα χρυσά μήλα των εσπερίδων	Vaggelis Serdaris; Renos Charalampidis; Sophia Papachristou
1996	Apontes	Απόντες	Nikos Grammatikos
1995	The lost treasure of Hursit Pasa; Paul Klee's Prophetic Bird of Sorrows	Ο χαμένος θησαυρός του Χουρσίτ Πασά; Το προφητικό πουλί των θλίψεων του Πάουλ Κλέε	Stavros Tsiolis; Costas Sfikas
1994	Telos Epohis	Τέλος εποχής	Antonis Kokkinos
1993	Lefteris Dimakopoulos	Λευτέρης Δημακόπουλος	Periklis Choursoglou
1992	Please Women Don't Cry; Byron, balanta gia enan daimonismeno	Παρακαλώ γυναίκες μην κλαίτε Μπάυρον, Μπαλάντα για ένα δαίμονα	Stavros Tsiolis; Nikos Koundouros
1991	not given		
1990	not given		
1989	Xenia; Olga Robards	Ξένια; Όλγα Ρόμπερτς	Patrice Vivancos; Christos Vakalopoulos
1988	In The Shadow of Fear	Στη σκιά του φόβου	Giorgos Karipidis
1987	The Children of the Swallow	Τα παιδιά της χελιδόνας	Costas Vrettakos
1986	The Photograph; Alligoria (special mention); The Tree We Hurt(special mention)	Η φωτογραφία Αλληγορία; Το δέντρο που πληγώναμε	Nikos Papatakis; Kostas Sfikas; Dimos Avdeliodis
1985	The children of Saturn (hororable mention); Topos (hororable mention); Stone Years (hororable mention)	Τα παιδιά του Κρόνου; Τόπος; Πέτρινα χρόνια	Giorgos Korras; Antouanetta Aggelidi; Pantelis Voulgaris
1984	The love of Ulysses; Karkalou	Ο έρωτας του Οδυσσέα; Καρκαλού	Vassilis Vafeas; Stavros Tornes
1983	Revanche	Ρεβάνς	Nikos Vergitsis
1982	Balamos (hororable mention); Repos (hororable mention)	Μπαλαμός; Ρεπό	Stavros Tornes; Vassilis Vafeas
1981	Oi dromoi tis agapis einai nyhterinoi To Ergostasio; To Kairo ton Ellinon	Οι δρόμοι της αγάπης είναι νυχτερινοί Το εργοστάσιο Τον καιρό των Ελλήνων	Frieda Liappa; Tasos Psarras; Lakis Papastathis
1980	Alexander the Great	Ο Μεγαλέξαντρος	Theodoros Angelopoulos
1979	I Periplanisi; Anatoliki Perifereia (special mention)	Η περιπλάνηση Ανατολική Περιφέρεια	Christoforos Christofis; Vassilis Vafeas
1978	The Lazy People From the Flourishing Valley	Οι τεμπέληδες της εύφορης κοιλάδας	Nikos Panagiotopoulos
1977	To Vary Peponi	Το Βαρύ Πεπόνι	Pavlos Tassios
1976	Happy Day	Happy Day	Pantelis Voulgaris

== See also ==
- Hellenic Film Academy Awards
- Greek State Film Awards

== Sources ==
- "Φεστιβάλ Κινηματογράφου Θεσσαλονίκης". Pekk.gr (in Greek). Archived from the original on 2013-06-04.
- "Τρία, δύο, ένα... Πάμεεε!". archive.in.gr. Archived from the original on 2012-01-30.
