= Boulmetis =

Boulmetis is a surname. Notable people with the surname include:

- Sam Boulmetis Sr. (1927-2021), American thoroughbred horse racing jockey
- Tassos Boulmetis (born 1957), Greek film director, screenwriter, and producer
