= Slaughter of the Cock =

1996 film

- Directed by: Andreas Pantzis
- Written by: Andreas Pantzis
- Starring: Georges Corraface
- Release date: 13 August 1996 (Locarno)
- Running time: 146 minutes
- Country: Greece
- Language: Greek

Slaughter of the Cock (Greek: Η Σφαγή του Κόκορα, I sfagi tou kokora) is a 1996 Greek drama film directed by Andreas Pantzis. The film was selected as the Greek entry for the Best Foreign Language Film at the 70th Academy Awards, but was not accepted as a nominee.

== Cast ==
- Georges Corraface as Evagoras
- Dimitris Vellios as Onisilos
- Valeria Golino as Wife
- Popi Avraam
- Gerasimos Skiadaressis
- Imma Piro
- Matthias Habich
- Seymour Cassel

== See also ==
- List of submissions to the 70th Academy Awards for Best Foreign Language Film
- List of Greek submissions for the Academy Award for Best Foreign Language Film
