= The Canary Yellow Bicycle =

- Directed by: Dimitris Stavrakas
- Written by: Vasilis Spiliopoulos
- Starring: Dimitris Alexandris
- Cinematography: Dinos Katsouridis
- Edited by: Dinos Katsouridis
- Music by: Nikos Kypourgos
- Release date: November 19, 1999
- Country: Greece
- Language: Greek

The Canary Yellow Bicycle (Greek: Το Καναρινί Ποδήλατο) is a Greek film directed by Dimitris Stavrakas. It released in 1999 and it stars Dimitris Alexandris. The film won the second best film award and the award of the best leading actor in the Greek State Film Awards.

== Plot ==
A young teacher is appointed to a primary school. He takes on the larger class and soon he ascertains that one pupil even doesn't know writing and reading. The older teachers in the school, believes that this boy is too weak, but the teacher perceives that the pupil just has some learning difficulties and he could improve with special education. The teacher offers him private tutoring where he applies special methods and he manages to improve the pupil. However his effort isn't easy because neither the family of the boy (family with low education) nor his colleagues (old, traditional teachers) in the school support him.

== Cast ==
- Dimitris Alexandris
- Yorgos Halaris
- Manos Vakousis
- Thanos Grammenos
- Nikos Georgakis

== Awards ==
List of awards and nominations
Award	Category	Recipients and nominees	Result
1999 Greek State Film Awards	Second Best Film	Dimitris Stavrakas	Won
1999 Greek State Film Awards	Best Actor	Dimitris Alexandris	Won
