= Victoria Haralabidou =

Greek actress

- Born: Saint Petersburg, Russia
- Occupation: Actress
- Years active: 1996–present

Victoria Haralabidou (Greek: Βικτώρια Χαραλαμπίδου) is a Greek Australian actress.

== Early life and education ==
Victoria Haralabidou was born in Saint Petersburg, communist Russia. By the age of seven, she had learned how to operate a fire arm and how to protect herself if under attack. Her parents, a mechanical engineer and a doctor, left Russia "for a better life". Her Greek grandfather, before them, had left Trapezounda, forced to leave everything behind when he was 10 years old and joined the Antartiko in Greece.

When she was 15 years old, and in her third year of high school, Haralabidou's family moved to Athens, where she didn't know the language prior. She studied Economics, Cinematography, Theatre, and Translation in Russia and Greece. She completely her final year of drama school in 1998.

In 2005, Haralabidou moved to Sydney, Australia.

== Career ==
In 2002, Haralabidou appeared in a stage production of Curse of the Starving Class, by Sam Shepard.

Haralabidou's debut film role was in the 2004 Martin Scorsese feature Brides, alongside Golden Globe winner Damian Lewis playing the less role of mail-order bride, Niki. She secured the role during her final year of drama school in Athens, when the casting agents invited students to attend the general audition. Pantelis Voulgaris, the director, invited her back into the audition room. Filming, didn't begin until five years later. Haralabidou won a Best Actress Award at the Thessaloniki International Film Festival for her performance.

She appeared in 2008 Greek film With Heart and Soul. In 2008 and 2011, she featured in SBS drama series East West 101. In 2009, she then appeared in the films Blessed and Deep Soul and short film Apricot (2009), as well as children's series My Place. She also had a recurring role in long-running soap opera Home and Away in 2009 and 2011 and appeared in 2010 AFI nominated film The Lovesong of Iskra Prufrock.

Haralabidou was appointed as Writer in Residence at Sydney's Griffin Theatre from 2011 to 2012. The same year, she started the production company VHS Productions, focused on producing Australian work by culturally diverse female artists. Her first play One Scientific Mystery was selected for the 2012 National Play Festival and was staged at the Tap Gallery Theatre, starring Aaron Jeffery. That same year, she featured in the 2012 Australian drama film Thirst, directed by Robert Carter.

In 2013, Haralabidou wrote The Political Hearts of Children for Subtlenuance and undertook a Dramaturgy Intern with Playwriting Australia. Her play Play Project 949 was selected for development by Somersault Theatre Company and in 2014 she won a Patrick White Award. She also wrote the play GRLZ, based on her real-life story and inspired by the #WeAreAllPussyRiot movement. It received multiple development workshops from 2014, including the National Play Workshop.

In 2014, Haralabidou appeared in award-winning ABC series The Code. In 2016, she starred in crime drama miniseries Deep Water, drama thriller series Hyde & Seek and drama miniseries Barracuda, the latter seeing her nominated for a Logie Award for her performance. The following year, she appeared in HBO American supernatural series The Leftovers.

Haralabidou appeared in a stage production of Dear Elena, a contemporary Russian play by Lyudmila Razumovskaya, which she also translated, in 2017 at the Theatre of the Society for Macedonian Studies in Thessaloniki, Greece.

Haralabidou appeared in 2019 feature film Hearts and Bones and in 2020, she starred in AACTA Award-winning short film I Want to Make a Film About Women in the lead role of Esfir Shub In 2021, she played the recurring role of Cath in ABC series Wakefield in 2021. and appeared in period film The Drover's Wife opposite Leah Purcell.

Haralabidou was cast as Lena in the 2022 TV series The Tourist, alongside Jamie Dornan, with the character also appearing in the second season in 2024. That same year, she appeared in season 2 of psychological thriller drama series The Secrets She Keeps. In 2023, she appeared in SBS drama series Erotic Stories and an episode of The Lost Flowers of Alice Hart.

She played the leading role of Natalia in the 2023 New Zealand comedy drama film The Moon Is Upside Down. In 2024, she appeared in a recurring role in Exposure and was named as part of the cast for season 2 of Black Snow. playing the role of Nadja.

Haralabidou's other stage credits include Stuff Happens, Sami in Paradise for Belvoir and a successful Australian tour of Agatha Christie's A Murder Is Announced.

== Personal life ==
Haralabidou is married to her Canberra-born husband, with whom she has a child.

== Awards ==
Year	Work	Award	Category	Result
2004	Brides	Greek State Film Awards at TIFF	Best Actress	Won

== Filmography ==
=== Film ===
Year	Title	Role	Notes
1996	Inepoli		
2000	A Bright Shining Sun		Short
2004	Brides	Niki Douka	Won Greek State Film Awards at TIFF for Best Actress
2009	Blessed	Gina	
2009	Deep Soul	Giannoula	
2009	Apricot	Marcel's Aunt	Short
2010	The Love Song of Iskra Prufrock	Iskra	Short
2012	Thirst	Minna	
2015	Deszcz	Magda	Short
2016	Here Is Now	Jessica	Short
2016	Adult	Elena	Short
2020	I Want to Make a Film About Women	Esfir Shub	Short
2021	The Drover's Wife	Elpida Savva	
2024	The Moon Is Upside Down	Natalia	Main role

=== Television ===
Year	Title	Role	Notes
2000	Kokkinos kyklos	Mary	"To klouvi"
2004	Etsi xafnika	Anna	TV series
2008	All Saints	Ashleigh Wellburn	"The Hand You're Dealt"
2008	The Strip	Lena Ivanova	"1.9"
2008	East West 101	Helena Tadic	"Haunted by the Past"
2008	The Informant	Vanessa Nikitin	TV film
2009	My Place	Mama	"1978 Mike", "1968 Sofia", "1958 Michaelis"
2009–2011	Home and Away	Jody Walker	Recurring role
2011	East West 101	Saja	"Behold a Pale Horse", "Revelation"
2014–2016	The Code	Alilah Parande	Recurring role
2016	Deep Water	Anna Rexhaj	TV miniseries
2016	Hyde & Seek	Parisa Ruhani	"1.6"
2016	Barracuda	Stephanie Kelly	TV miniseries
2017	The Leftovers	Dr. Matti Bekker	"3.4", "3.6", "3.8"
2020	Operation Buffalo	Maria	1 episode
2021	Wakefield	Cath	7 episodes
2021	The Tailings	Sharon	6 episodes
2021	Eden	Drysdale's Mother	1 episode
2021	Born to Spy	Harriett	1 episode
2022	The Secrets She Keeps	Detective Cash	6 episodes
2022–2024	The Tourist	Lena Pascall	10 episodes
2023	The Lost Flowers of Alice Hart	Jana	1 episode
2023	Erotic Stories	Toni	1 episode
2023	Zombie Therapy	Jacinta Brightface	2 episodes
2024	Prosper	Selene Karras	1 episode
2024	Exposure	Val	4 episodes
2025	Black Snow	Nadja Jacobs	Season 2

== Theatre ==
Year	Title	Role	Notes	Ref.
1998	SubUrbia	Beebe	Theatre-at-Colonus, Greece	
2001	Dear Elena	Lialia	Theatre-at-Colonus, Greece	
2002	Curse of the Starving Class	Emma	Theatre-at-Colonus, Greece	
2005	Stuff Happens	Various / Ensemble / Iraqi Exile	Company B	
2013	A Murder is Announced	Mitzi	Australian tour with Louise Withers & Associates	
2013	One Scientific Mystery or Why Did the Aborigines Eat Captain Cook?	Doosia	Tap Gallery Theatre, Sydney with VHS Productions; also writer	
2013	The Political Hearts of Children for Subtlenuance	Writer		
	Play Project 949	Writer	Somersault Theatre Company	
2014	GRLZ	Writer		
2017	Dear Elena		Theatre of the Society for Macedonian Studies, Thessaloniki; also translator	
2018	Sami in Paradise	Maria	Belvoir Theatre, Sydney	
