= Theofilos (film) =

1987 film

- Directed by: Lakis Papastathis
- Written by: Lakis Papastathis
- Produced by: Lakis Papastathis
- Starring: Dimitris Katalifos
- Cinematography: Thodoros Margas
- Edited by: Vangelis Gousias
- Release date: October 1987
- Running time: 115 minutes
- Country: Greece
- Language: Greek

Theofilos (Greek: Θεόφιλος) is a 1987 Greek drama film directed by Lakis Papastathis on the life of the Greek painter Theofilos Hatzimichail. It was entered into the 38th Berlin International Film Festival. The film was selected as the Greek entry for the Best Foreign Language Film at the 60th Academy Awards, but was not accepted as a nominee.

== Cast ==
- Dimitris Katalifos as Theofilos Hatzimichail
- Manthos Athinaios
- Thodoros Exarhos
- Stamatis Fasoulis
- Irini Hatzikonstadi
- Dimitris Kaberidis
- Dimitris Katsimanis
- Anastasia Kritsi
- Constantine Lyras (as Dinos Lyras)
- Fraizi Mahaira
- Ivonni Maltezou
- Themis Manesis
- Stratos Pahis
- Stelios Pavlou
- Aris Petropoulos

== See also ==
- List of submissions to the 60th Academy Awards for Best Foreign Language Film
- List of Greek submissions for the Academy Award for Best Foreign Language Film
