= Dimitris Kataleifos =

Greek actor

- Born: 1954 (age 71–72); Athens, Greece
- Occupation: Actor
- Years active: 1978-present

Dimitris Kataleifos (Greek: Δημήτρης Καταλειφός; born 1954) is a Greek actor and writer. He appeared in more than twenty films since 1978.

== Selected filmography ==
Year	Title	Role	Notes
1987	Theofilos		
1994	Jaguar	llias	
1998	It's a Long Road		
2004	Brides		
2010	Journey to Mytilene		
2016	The Other Me		
2020	Nikos Karouzos: poems on the tape recorder		
