= When Tomatoes Met Wagner =

2019 film

- Film poster
- Directed by: Marianna Economou
- Release date: 7 June 2019 (Sydney)
- Running time: 72 minutes
- Country: Greece
- Language: Greek

When Tomatoes Met Wagner (Greek: Όταν ο Βάγκνερ Συνάντησε τις Ντομάτες, romanized: Ótan o Vánkner Synántise tis Ntomátes) is a 2019 Greek documentary film directed by Marianna Economou. It was selected as the Greek entry for the Best International Feature Film at the 92nd Academy Awards, but it was not nominated.

== See also ==
- List of submissions to the 92nd Academy Awards for Best International Feature Film
- List of Greek submissions for the Academy Award for Best International Feature Film
