= Deep Soul (film) =

- Directed by: Pantelis Voulgaris
- Starring: Yorgos Angelkos; Christos Karteris
- Release date: 22 October 2009
- Running time: 124 minutes
- Country: Greece
- Language: Greek

Deep Soul (Greek: Ψυχή Βαθιά) is a 2009 Greek drama film directed by Pantelis Voulgaris, on the 1946–49 Greek Civil War.

== Plot ==
The story takes place during Greek Civil War. Two brothers from Greek countryside find themselves to fight with the two opposite sides. Both of them serve as guides for the mountainous paths of Western Macedonia, an area with many battlefields. Gradually the two boys are fanaticized and become crueler by war conditions. The film shows the hard condition of battlefields as well the impact of the war on the civilians.

== Cast ==
- Yorgos Angelkos as Vlasis / Comrade Flogas
- Christos Karteris as Anestis
- Vangelis Mourikis as Captain Ntoulas
- Giorgos Symeonidis as Second Lieutenant Triantafillos
- Kostas Kleftogiannis as Taxiarhos
- Victoria Haralabidou as Giannoula
- Thanasis Veggos as the two brothers' grandfather
