= Testosterone (2004 film) =

- Directed by: Giorgos Panousopoulos
- Written by: Auguste Corteau
- Starring: Dimitris Liakopoulos, Natalia Dragoumi, Dimitra Matsouka
- Cinematography: Giorgos Panousopoulos
- Edited by: Panos Daoultzis
- Release date: 2004
- Country: Greece
- Language: Greek

Testosterone (Greek: Τεστοστερόνη/Testosteroni) is a Greek film directed by Giorgos Panousopoulos. It released in 2004 and it stars Dimitris Liakopoulos, Natalia Dragoumi, Dimitra Matsouka and others. The film won the third best film award and the award of the best leading actor in the Greek State Film Awards. The film was shot in Naxos.

== Plot ==
A young man during military service takes his leave and goes to a Greek island in order to borrow an old car by his grandmother. Due to a breakdown in the car, he remains in the island longer until it is repaired. During his accommodation in the island, he ascertains that he comes across only women. At the beginning, he likes this situation but gradually it turns into a nightmare.

== Cast ==
- Dimitris Liakopoulos
- Natalia Dragoumi
- Dimitra Matsouka
- Ketty Papanika
- Tatiana Papamoschou
- Maria Zorba

== Awards ==
List of awards and nominations
Award	Category	Recipients and nominees	Result
2004 Greek State Film Awards	Third Best Film	Giorgos Panousopoulos	Won
2004 Greek State Film Awards	Best Actor	Dimitris Liakopoulos	Won
