= Edge of Night (film) =

Edge of Night (Afti i Nyhta Menei)
- Directed by: Nikos Panayotopoulos
- Written by: Thanos Alexandris
- Starring: Nikos Kouris; Athina Maximou; Zoi Nalbanti; Kostas Markopoulos
- Cinematography: Aris Stavrou
- Edited by: Ioanna Spiliopoulou
- Music by: Stamatis Kraounakis
- Release date: January 7, 2000
- Running time: 112 minutes
- Country: Greece
- Language: Greek

Edge of Night (Greek: Αυτή η Νύχτα Μένει/Afti i Nyhta Menei) is a Greek film directed by Nikos Panayotopoulos. The film released on 7 January 2000 and stars Nikos Kouris and Athina Maximou. It won six awards in Greek State Film Awards.

== Plot ==
Stella is a beautiful young woman with a talent in singing. She dreams of doing one day a big career in singing. Andreas, her boyfriend who works in a small store, doesn't approve her dreams and as consequence there are quarrels between them. When Stella decides to go in the north Greece to sing in night clubs, Andreas sets off to find her, wandered in the places of night fun. Soon Stella is disappointed by the people of nightlife and returns to Andreas.

== Cast ==
- Nikos Kouris as Andreas
- Athina Maximou as Stella
- Zoi Nalbanti as Tzina
- Kostas Markopoulos as boxer

== Reception ==
winner:

- 2000: Greek State Film Awards for best actress (Athina Maximou)
- 2000: Greek State Film Awards for best supporting actress (Zoe Nalbanti)
- 2000: Greek State Film Awards for best music (Stamatis Kraounakis)
- 2000: Greek State Film Awards for best sound
- 2000: Greek State Film Awards for best set decoration
- 2000: Greek State Film Awards for best film (Second place)

nominated:

- 2000: Cairo International Film Festival for Golden Pyramid
