= Ieroklis Michailidis =

Greek actor

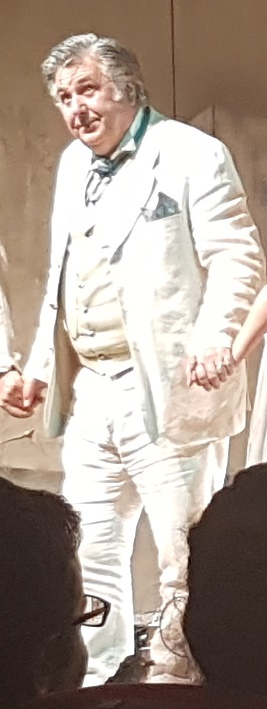
- Ieroklis Michailidis on stage in 2016
- Born: 29 September 1960 (age 65); Ptolemaida, Greece
- Occupation: Actor
- Years active: 1992–present

Ieroklis Michailidis (Greek: Ιεροκλής Μιχαηλίδης, born 29 September 1960 in Ptolemaida) is a Greek actor. He appeared in more than twenty films since 1992.

== Filmography ==
Year	Title	Role	Notes
2018	1968	Maestro	
2003	A Touch of Spice		
2000	Backdoor		

=== Television ===
Year	Title	Role(s)	Notes
2004-2005	Appointment in Athens	Himself (host)	Saturday talk show
2006-2008	The stories of officer Bekas	Giorgos Bekas	Lead role, 58 episodes
2008-2010	L.A.P.D.	Prokopis Biskinoglou	Lead role, 52 episodes
2011	My memories' name is Pontus	Himself (host)	Docuseries
2013-2014	With the plants off	Andonis Karavoulias	Lead role, 34 episodes
2013-2014	Lampeter with Lambis Tagmatarchis	Himself (co-host)	Late night talk show
2015-2016	Yes Chef!	Vasilis Kokoris	Lead role, 22 episodes
2015-2016	Seven Museums, One Trip with Ieroklis Michailidis	Himself (host)	Docuseries on MEGA, 7 episodes
2018-2019	You cannot wait a good from your parents	Kostas Karamagkiolis	Lead role, 15 episodes
2019	Pontus - Crucifixion and Tomb	Himself (narrator)	TV special
2019	8 Words	Vangelis Roditis	32 episodes
2020	The Other Me - Purification	Alexandros Faroupos	Lead role, 8 episodes
2021	The Grandmother with Ieroklis Michailidis	Himself (host)	Late night talk show on OPEN; also creator
2021-2022	Mum, let us alone	Thomas Papapetrou	Lead role, 125 episodes
2023	On 4 wheels	Nikos Iakovidis	Main role, 8 episodes
2023	Murders in the Bell Tower	Dimitris Kalogirou	3 episodes
