= Lefteris Dimakopoulos =

- Directed by: Periklis Hoursoglou
- Written by: Periklis Hoursoglous
- Starring: Nikos Georgakis; Maria Skoula; Nikos Orphanos
- Cinematography: Stamatis Giannoulis
- Edited by: Takis Yannopoulos
- Release date: September 1993
- Running time: 105 minute
- Country: Greece
- Language: Greek

Lefteris Dimakopoulos is a Greek film released in 1993, directed by Periklis Hoursoglou. The film stars Nikos Georgakis, Maria Skoula and Nikos Orphanos. The film won four awards in Greek State Film Awards, as well the best film award in Greek Film Critics Association Awards.

== Plot ==
The story takes place during the last years of the Junta. Lefteris, a young man with dreams aspires to become a successful and free man. So he leaves from his agricultural village and refuses to work in the fish market, to study in the Polytechnic University of Athens. In Athens, he lives with his girlfriend Dimitra, despite the opposition of his uncle who pay tuitions of his studies.

Nevertheless, the next years, he feels that his relation with Dimitra becomes an obstacle to his ambitions. Finally he breaks up with his girlfriend. After many years he has become a successful engineer, but a visit of his best friend reminds him in the lost love with Dimitra. Then, he perceives that he hadn't won happiness.

== Cast ==
- Nikos Georgakis as Lefteris
- Maria Skoula as Dimitra
- Nikos Orphanos as Panayiotis

== Awards ==
List of awards and nominations
Award	Category	Recipients and nominees	Result
1993 Greek State Film Awards	Best Film	Periklis Hoursoglou	Won
1993 Greek State Film Awards	Best Cinematography	Stamatis Giannoulis	Won
1993 Greek State Film Awards	Best Production Design	Anastasia Arseni	Won
1993 Greek State Film Awards	Best First Film Director	Periklis Hoursoglou	Won
Greek Film Critics Association Awards	Best Film	Periklis Hoursoglou	Won
