= Return of the Bastards =

- Directed by: Fokionas Bogris
- Written by: Fokionas Bogris
- Starring: Apostolos Souglakos
- Release date: December 16, 2003
- Running time: 76 minutes
- Country: Greece
- Language: Greek

Return of the Bastards (Greek: Επιστροφή των Καθαρμάτων) is a 2003 Greek exploitation film directed by Fokionas Bogris and starring Apostolos Souglakos, Christos Natsios, Nikos Tsachiridis and Fay Demani.
