= The Other Me (2016 film) =

- Directed by: Sotiris Tsafoulias
- Starring: Pigmalion Dadakaridis; Dimitris Kataleifos
- Release date: 7 November 2016 (TIFF)
- Running time: 101 minutes
- Country: Greece
- Language: Greek

The Other Me (Greek: Έτερος Εγώ) is a 2016 Greek crime film directed by Sotiris Tsafoulias. The theater release was stopped after the film possibly inspired a murder.

== Plot ==
A serial killer uses the number 220 as their mark, accompanied by quotes of Pythagoras. After two consecutive murders that involves a doctor and a judge, the police hires young criminologist and lecturer Dimitris Lainis to help. Later on, the third victim, a well-known lawyer is murdered in his hotel room. Dimitris discovers that the lawyer and the judge are involved in many cases of corruptions, murder and assassination in the past. Furthermore, he also finds out that the killer wants the police to discover something rather than taunting them with cryptic message. It is later on revealed that all killings are linked to a fatal car accident that killed a woman named Kleio Rapti while leaving her fiancee alive in the motorbike. The drunk driver lied to the police that the couple was driving recklessly and the judge and the lawyer as well as the medical examining doctor were bribed to conceal the truth. This led to the drunk driver being declared innocent while the surviving man was paralyzed. After attending a lecture by French mathematician Marcel de Chaffe, Dimitris learns about "eteros ego", translating to "the other me". It is a formula known by the pythagoreans regarding amicable numbers, pairs of numbers whose proper divisors sum to the other, like 220 and 284. Later reports reveal Kleio Rapti was wearing an amulet with the number 284 carved on it. Dimistris visits the surviving victim as he suspects he has a right motive for revenge but since he is paralyzed there are no ways he could have committed the murders. Dimitris leaves his house not before the man tells him to send his gratitudes to the killer for killing those involved in his fiancée's death in the car accident. the drunk driver is later on found dead in an abandoned building with his heart being ripped out of his chest. The police then discovers that there are always drugs in the systems of all the victims so the killer must be an anesthesiologist to have access to such drugs to immobilize the victims.

Eventually, Dimitris discovers the murderer is Kleio's best friend Danae, who owns a similar amulet with the number 220. She orchestrated all the killings to avenge Rapti's death. Feeling that Danae deserves her vengeance, Dimitris decides to cover up her crimes.

== Cast ==
- Pigmalion Dadakaridis as Professor Dimitris Lainis
- Dimitris Kataleifos as Aristotelis Adamantinos
- Manos Vakousis as Apostolos Barassopoulos
- Ioanna Kolliopoulou as Sofia
- François Cluzet as Marcel de Chaffe
- Kora Karvouni as Danae
- Giorgos Chrysostomou as Manthos Kozoros
- Anna Kalaitzidou as Kleio Rapti
