= Truants (film) =

- Directed by: Nikos Grammatikos
- Written by: Nikos Grammatikos
- Starring: Nikos Georgakis, Giorgos Evgenikos, Vangelis Mourikis, Tasos Nousias, Costas Staridas, Aimilios Cheilakis
- Cinematography: Kostas Gikas
- Edited by: Yorgos Mavropsaridis
- Release date: December 6, 1996
- Running time: 115 minutes
- Country: Greece
- Language: Greek

Truants (Greek: Απόντες, Apontes) is a Greek film directed by Nikos Grammatikos. The film released in 1996 and it stars Nikos Georgakis, Giorgos Evgenikos, Vangelis Mourikis, Tasos Nousias, Costas Staridas and Aimilios Cheilakis. The film is also known with the English title The Absent Ones. It won the best film award both the Greek State Film Awards and the Greek Film Critics Association Awards.

== Plot ==
Six old schoolfriends meet every summer in Salamina, the place where they grew up. Year after year they change and mature and the youthful dreams are replaced by reality. Αs they grow up, their once-solid friendship inevitably fades. Finally, they follow different paths and gradually become like strangers. One member doesn't stand the situation and commits suicide.

== Cast ==
- Nikos Georgakis as Andreas
- Yorgos Evgenikos as Manolis
- Vangelis Mourikis as Sakis
- Tasos Nousias as Giannis
- Kostas Staridas as Nikos
- Emilios Chilakis as Antonis

== Awards ==
List of awards and nominations
Award	Category	Recipients and nominees	Result
1996 Greek State Film Awards	Best Film	Nikos Grammatikos	Won
1996 Greek State Film Awards	Best Director	Nikos Grammatikos	Won
1996 Greek State Film Awards	Best Screenplay	Nikos Grammatikos	Won
1996 Greek State Film Awards	Best Supporting Actor	Nikos Georgakis, Giorgos Evgenikos, Vangelis Mourikis, Tasos Nousias, Costas Staridas, Aimilios Cheilakis	Won
Greek Film Critics Association Awards	Best Film	Nikos Grammatikos	Won
