= Chariton's Choir =

- Directed by: Grigoris Karantinakis
- Written by: Grigoris Karantinakis; Yorgos Makris; Dimitris Vakis
- Starring: Georges Corraface; Maria Nafpliotou; Akilas Karazisis; Christos Stergioglou
- Cinematography: Nikos Kavoukidis
- Edited by: Takis Yannopoulos
- Music by: Nikos Platyrachos
- Release date: 2005
- Running time: 116 minutes
- Country: Greece
- Language: Greek

Chariton's Choir (Greek: Η χορωδία του Χαρίτωνα / I horodia tou haritona) is a 2005 Greek film directed by Grigoris Karantinakis. It was Greece's submission to the 79th Academy Awards for the Academy Award for Best Foreign Language Film, but was not accepted as a nominee.

== Plot ==
The flirtatious headmaster of a school in a small town prepares his pupils for the choirs' Olympics. The arrival of the new army commander in town, upsets the headmaster, as they both fall in love with the same woman.

== Cast ==
- George Corraface as Chariton (school's headmaster)
- Maria Nafpliotou as Eleni (teacher)
- Akilas Karazisis as Dimitriou (army commander)
- Christos Stergioglou as Drakos (teacher)

== Accolades ==
Winner:

- 2005: Greek State Film Awards for Best Film
- 2005: Greek State Film Awards for Best Sound

Nominated:

- 2006:Academy Award for Best Foreign Language Film (not nominated)

== See also ==
- Cinema of Greece
- List of submissions to the 79th Academy Awards for Best Foreign Language Film
