= Vasiliki (film) =

- Directed by: Vangelis Serdaris
- Written by: Vangelis Serdaris
- Starring: Paschalis Tsarouhas; Tamila Koulieva; Vasilis Papanikas; Vivian Kontomari
- Cinematography: Aggelos Viskadourakis
- Edited by: Kostas Raftopoulos
- Music by: Giorgos Tsangaris
- Release date: November 15, 1997
- Running time: 135 minutes
- Country: Greece
- Language: Greek

Vasiliki (Greek: Βασιλική) is a Greek film directed by Vangelis Serdaris. It released in 1997 and star Paschalis Tsarouhas and Tamila Koulieva. The film received the Greek Film Critics Association Awards. Also, Paschalis Tsarouhas won the award for best actor in the Cairo International Film Festival and Giorgos Tsangaris won the award for best music in Greek State Film Awards.

== Plot ==
The film presents the riotous years immediately after the Greek Civil War. Set during the Greek Civil War, Vasiliki is married to a Greek communist guerrilla. The local gendarmerie arrests her because she brought food to her husband. The chief of gendarmerie charmed by her beauty, rapes her. Then, he moved in another city but returned to ask her to follow him (meanwhile her husband had been killed in the war). His love for the wife of a communist is the cause for which he is expelled by the gendarmerie. Thus he moves to a place in Northern Greece making plans for his professional future. After the sudden death of his partner his plans fail. He seeks help from a rich businessman who though uses his ideas for his own purposes. The impediments that he meets make him more and more violent resulting to lose his wife and eventually to reach the crime when he kills the businessman.

== Cast ==
- Paschalis Tsarouhas as Leonidas Loufakos
- Tamila Koulieva as Vasiliki
- Vasilis Papanikas as Giagos Hrysomoglou
- Vivian Kontomari as Smaragda
- Haris Gregoropoulos
- Nikos Katis
- Michalis Iatropoulos

== Awards ==
List of awards and nominations
Award	Category	Recipients and nominees	Result
1998 Cairo International Film Festival	Best Actor	Paschalis Tsarouhas	Won
1998 Mar del Plata International Film Festival	Best Actor	Paschalis Tsarouhas	Won
1997 Greek State Film Awards	Best Music	Giorgos Tsangaris	Won
Greek Film Critics Association Awards	Best Film	Vangelis Serdaris	Won
