= From the Snow =

- Directed by: Sotiris Goritsas
- Written by: Sotiris Goritsas; Sotiris Dimitriou
- Starring: Gerasimos Skiadaresis; Vasias Eleftheriadis; Mania Papadimitriou
- Cinematography: Stamatis Giannoulis
- Edited by: Takis Koumoundouros
- Release date: September 1993
- Running time: 90 minutes
- Country: Greece
- Language: Greek

From the Snow (Greek: Απ' το χιόνι) is a Greek drama film directed by Sotiris Goritsas. The film released in 1993 and stars Gerasimos Skiadaresis. The film won the Golden Alexander award in Thessaloniki Film Festival and the Best Movie Award in Greek State Film Awards.

== Plot ==
A few men from South Albania (North Epirus) immigrate to Greece during the Albanian crisis. The film follows their travel for a better life in Greece. After crossing the borders on foot, they arrive in Athens with every transport means. There, they face the racism from local society. Some people help them but the difficulties are so many that they decide to return to their village in Albania.

== Cast ==
- Gerasimos Skiadaresis
- Vasias Eleftheriadis
- Mania Papadimitriou

== Awards ==
List of awards and nominations
Award	Category	Recipients and nominees	Result
1993 Thessaloniki International Film Festival	Golden Alexander	Sotiris Goritsas	Won
1993 Greek State Film Awards	Best Film	Sotiris Goritsas	Won
1993 Greek State Film Awards	Best Screenplay	Sotiris Goritsas	Won
