= Love Under the Date-Tree =

1990 film

- Directed by: Stavros Tsiolis
- Written by: Stavros Tsiolis
- Starring: Argyris Bakirtzis
- Release date: 1990
- Running time: 82 minutes
- Country: Greece
- Language: Greek

Love Under the Date-Tree (Greek: Έρωτας στη χουρμαδιά, Erotas sti hourmadia) is a 1990 Greek comedy film directed by Stavros Tsiolis. The film was selected as the Greek entry for the Best Foreign Language Film at the 63rd Academy Awards, but was not accepted as a nominee.

== Cast ==
- Argyris Bakirtzis as Panagiotis
- Lazaros Andreou as Giannis
- Dora Masklavanou
- Vina Asiki as Filitsa

== See also ==
- List of submissions to the 63rd Academy Awards for Best Foreign Language Film
- List of Greek submissions for the Academy Award for Best Foreign Language Film
