= End of an Era (film) =

- Directed by: Antonis Kokkinos
- Written by: Antonis Kokkinos; Alexandros Kakavas
- Starring: Kostas Kazanas; Dimosthenis Papadopoulos; Giorgos Pyrpasopoulos; Despoina Kourti; Pegky Trikalioti; Vangelis Kazan; Despoina Tomazani
- Cinematography: Stavros Hassapis
- Edited by: Ioanna Spiliopoulou
- Release date: November 1994
- Running time: 98 minutes
- Country: Greece
- Language: Greek

End of an Era (Greek: Τέλος Εποχής Telos Epochis) is a Greek film released in 1994. The film directed by Antonis Kokkinos and stars Kostas Kazanas, Dimosthenis Papadopoulos, Giorgos Pyrpasopoulos, Despoina Kourti, Pegky Trikalioti, Vangelis Kazan and Despoina Tomazani. The film won five awards in Greek State Film Awards and the best film award in Greek Film Critics Association Awards.

== Plot ==
Christos a high school student of the last class moves to Athens with his family in order to prepare better for his entry exams of university. He soon is accepted by a group of school students. He and his new friends live their youth through the era of great changes, at the end of 60s. The music, the theatre, the pirate radio and the love are the way out from the illiberal and conservative environment caused by Greek military junta. At the end of the decade the friends finishes the school and their routes separate.

== Cast ==
- Kostas Kazanas ..... Giorgos
- Dimosthenis Papadopoulos ..... Christos Vamvakas
- Giorgos Pyrpasopoulos ..... Pericles
- Despoina Kourti ..... Lena
- Pegky Trikalioti ..... Stella
- Vangelis Kazan ..... Fotis Vamvakas
- Despoina Tomazani ..... Maria Drosou

== Awards ==
List of awards and nominations
Award	Category	Recipients and nominees	Result
1994 Greek State Film Awards	Best Film	Antonis Kokkinos	Won
1994 Greek State Film Awards	Best Screenplay	Antonis Kokkinos, Alexandros Kakavas	Won
1994 Greek State Film Awards	Best Supporting Actress	Pegky Trikalioti	Won
1994 Greek State Film Awards	Best Editing	Ioanna Spiliopoulou	Won
1994 Greek State Film Awards	Best Sound	Nikos Papadimitriou	Won
Greek Film Critics Association Awards	Best Film	Antonis Kokkinos	Won
