= Still Looking for Morphine =

- Πες στη Μορφίνη Ακόμα την Ψάχνω
- Directed by: Yannis Fagras
- Written by: Yannis Fagras; Nicole Roussou
- Produced by: Yannis Fagras
- Starring: Ekavi Douma; Panagiotis Karras; Nikos Pomonis; Christina Fragiadaki; Iosif Polyzoidis
- Cinematography: Panayotis Salapatas
- Edited by: Yannis Fagras
- Music by: Active Member
- Production company: TwoStroke Films
- Release date: November 2001 (Thessaloniki International Film Festival)
- Running time: 119 minutes
- Country: Greece
- Language: Greek

Still Looking for Morphine (Πες στη Μορφίνη Ακόμα την Ψάχνω) is a 2001 Greek independent drama film written and directed by Yannis Fagras in his feature directorial debut. Co-written with Nicole Roussou, the film is set in the industrial port areas of Piraeus and explores a teenage girl's coming-of-age amid petty theft, drug use, and marginal urban life during an oppressive summer.

The film premiered in competition at the 42nd Thessaloniki International Film Festival in 2001, where it received the Best Film award from the Association of Greek Film Critics (PEKK). It was later included in Sight & Sound magazine's 2007 list of "75 hidden gems" of world cinema—overlooked great films across history, compiled for the magazine's 75th anniversary.

== Plot ==
Ricky rides her motorcycle through real and imagined dangers during a sweltering summer in Piraeus, navigating a landscape disrupted by unrelenting wind, idleness, theft, and illegal substances. An unexpected act of violence pushes her maturation, transforming her from a girl into a woman and opening a new path that is both dark and hopeful—symbolized by the ships docked in the harbor visible from her window, where pain coexists with possibility.

== Cast ==
- Ekavi Douma as Ricky
- Panagiotis Karras
- Nikos Pomonis
- Christina Fragiadaki
- Iosif Polyzoidis
- Katerina Fagras

== Production ==
The film was self-financed and produced through TwoStroke Films without any government or external funding. Fagras handled direction, co-writing, production, and editing. It was shot digitally in black-and-white on 35mm, with cinematography by Panayotis Salapatas and an original score by the Greek hip-hop group Active Member.
