= Think It Over (film) =

2002 film

- Directed by: Katerina Evangelakou
- Written by: Katerina Evangelakou
- Starring: Mania Papadimitriou
- Release date: 14 November 2002
- Running time: 100 minutes
- Country: Greece
- Language: Greek

Think It Over (Greek: Θα το Μετανιώσεις) is a 2002 Greek comedy film directed by Katerina Evangelakou. It was selected as the Greek entry for the Best Foreign Language Film at the 76th Academy Awards, but it was not nominated.

== Cast ==
- Mania Papadimitriou as Maraki
- Ivonni Maltezou as Ioulia
- Christos Stergioglou as Menis
- Lena Kitsopoulou as Anthoula

== See also ==
- List of submissions to the 76th Academy Awards for Best Foreign Language Film
- List of Greek submissions for the Academy Award for Best International Feature Film
