= From the Edge of the City =

From the Edge of the City Από την άκρη της πόλης
- Directed by: Constantinos Giannaris
- Written by: Constantinos Giannaris
- Starring: Stathis Papadopoulos; Theodora Tzimou; Costas Kotsianisis; Panagiotis Hartomatzidis
- Cinematography: Yorgos Argiroliopoulos
- Edited by: Ioanna Spiliopoulou
- Music by: Akis Daoutis
- Release date: November 20, 1998
- Running time: 94 minutes
- Country: Greece
- Language: Greek

From the Edge of the City (Greek: Από την άκρη της πόλης, romanized: Apo tin akri tis polis) is a 1998 Greek film directed by Constantinos Giannaris. It was Greece's official Best Foreign Language Film submission at the 72nd Academy Awards, but did not manage to receive a nomination.

== Plot ==
A company of young Pontic Greeks refugees from Russia live in Menidi, a suburb in the edge of Athens. Sasha, the main character, quits his job and collides with his father. His situation spurs him to chase the easy money, ending up in the dark world of prostitution and drugs.

== Cast ==
- Stathis Papadopoulos as Sasha
- Theodora Tzimou as Natasha
- Costas Kotsianisis as Kotzian
- Panagiotis Hartomatzidis as Panagiotis

== Reception ==
=== Awards ===
winner:

- 1998: Greek State Film Awards: for Best Director (Constantinos Giannaris)
- 1998: Greek State Film Awards: for Best Film (2nd place)
- 1998: Greek Film Critics Association Awards

nominated:

- 1998: Thessaloniki International Film Festival: for Golden Alexander

In 1999, the film was Greece's official Best Foreign Language Film submission at the 72nd Academy Awards, but did not manage to receive a nomination.

== See also ==
- List of submissions to the 72nd Academy Awards for Best Foreign Language Film
- List of Greek submissions for the Academy Award for Best Foreign Language Film
