= It's a Long Road =

- Directed by: Pantelis Voulgaris
- Written by: Giorgios Skabardonis, Pantelis Voulgaris
- Produced by: Panos Papadopulos
- Starring: Thanassis Veggos; Giorgos Armenis; Dimitris Katalifos; Kostas Kazanas
- Music by: Stamatis Spanoudakis
- Distributed by: Pro-optiki
- Release date: 3 May 1998
- Running time: 136 minutes
- Country: Greece
- Language: Greek
- Budget: $250,000

It's a Long Road (Όλα είναι δρόμος Óla eínai drómos) is a 1998 film by Greek film director Pantelis Voulgaris. It is a triptych, with all three parts taking place in Macedonia and Thrace, two of the more economically depressed areas of Greece.

== Cast ==
- Thanasis Veggos as Antonis
- Giorgos Armenis as Makis Tsetsenoglou
- Dimitris Kataleifos as Vasilis Vasileiadis

== Awards ==
List of awards and nominations
Award	Category	Recipients	Result
1998 Greek State Film Awards	Best Actor	Giorgos Armenis	Won
1998 Greek State Film Awards	Best Make up	Fani Alexaki	Won
