= A Touch of Spice =

2003 film directed by Tassos Boulmetis

- Directed by: Tassos Boulmetis
- Starring: Georges Corraface; Ieroklis Michaelidis; Renia Louizidou; Başak Köklükaya; Tamer Karadağlı
- Cinematography: Takis Zervoulakos
- Edited by: Yorgos Mavropsaridis
- Music by: Evanthia Reboutsika
- Production companies: Village Roadshow Productions S.A. Smallridge; ANS International; MC² Productions
- Distributed by: Capitol Films; Village Roadshow Film Distributors Greece Ltd
- Release date: 2003
- Running time: 108 minutes
- Countries: Greece; Turkey; France
- Languages: Greek; Turkish; English
- Budget: €2 million ($2.3 million)
- Box office: $10.4 million

A Touch of Spice (Greek: Πολίτικη Κουζίνα/Politiki Kouzina) is a 2003 Greek film directed by Tassos Boulmetis and starring Georges Corraface as the character of the adult Fanis Iakovides. The character of Fanis Iakovides as a child is played by Markos Osse and the supporting role of Fanis's grandfather, Vassilis, is played by Tassos Bandis.

== Name ==
The original Greek title is Πολίτικη Κουζίνα (Politiki Kouzina) which means Cuisine of the City and refers to the Cuisine of Constantinople. However, in the film's promotional material , the word Politiki of the title is depicted in capital letters, therefore allowing an alternative reading of the title, due to the lack of stress marks, as Πολιτική Κουζίνα (Politiki Kouzina) which means Political Cuisine signifying the important role that politics played in the lives of the main characters.

== Plot ==
Fanis Iakovides, professor of astronomy and astrophysics, recalls his childhood memories from growing up in Istanbul. When Fanis was 7 years old, his grandfather Vassilis was an owner of a general store with a specialty in spices. He was also a culinary philosopher and his mentor. Fanis grew very attached to his grandfather who would assist with his homework using imaginative techniques. For instance, Vassilis would teach his grandson the planets of the Solar System by showing an illustration of it and replacing the planets with spices. Cinnamon took the place of Venus since according to Vassilis, "like all women, cinnamon is both bitter and sweet". Fanis also fell in love for the first time in his grandfather store's upper floor with a young Turkish girl, Saime.

However, beginning with the Istanbul Pogrom in 1955, through 1978, the ethnic Greek community of Istanbul was reduced from 135,000 to 7,000 by a series of government orchestrated riots, pogroms and deportations. Most of Fanis' family is deported in 1964 with the Ankara government decision to renege on the 1930 Greco-Turkish Ankara Convention, affirming the right of Greek etablis (Greeks who were born and lived in Istanbul but held Greek citizenship) to live and work in Turkey, and most Greek citizens who lived in Constantinople were deported to Greece, despite most never having previously resided there. Since Vassilis was not a dual citizen, he was able to stay behind while his grandson Fanis and his parents were deported to Athens.

Fanis had trouble initially adapting in Greece, constantly trying to spend his time in the kitchen cooking, as it was the only link between him and his homeland. However, this would upset his mother who was afraid that the boy was either severely depressed or a homosexual. Fanis grew from childhood to adulthood, preserving his culinary talents and often offering his secrets of the Politiki Cuisine to those that ask for his help.

As the years passed by, and the tension between Turkey and Greece resolved, grandfather Vassilis made several promises to visit his grandson in Athens but failed to keep them. The reason for the final incompletion of this engagement was his rapidly declining health. Consequently, Fanis returns to Constantinople after three decades to visit his near-death grandfather and also runs into his old love, Saime, who is now married. Together, they reflect on their lives and the way politics managed to change everything.

Fanis will eventually realize that contrary to what his grandfather had taught him, he forgot to put a little bit of "spice in his own life".

=== Analysis ===
The main characters easily fit into a parallel metaphor - Saime, the old love of Fanis, a beautiful Turkish girl and multi-lingual tour guide, represents Istanbul (a cosmopolitan city called a "she" in Greek), Fanis is modern Greece, one that is still deeply in love with Constantinople and nostalgic for the past, while Saime's husband is a Turkish military doctor who represents a modern, pragmatic Turkey.

== Cast ==
- Georges Corraface as Fanis Iakovidis
  - Odysseas Papaspiliopoulos as Fanis - 18 years old
  - Markos Osse as Fanis - 8 years old
- Ieroklis Michaelidis as Savvas Iakovidis
- Renia Louizidou as Soultana Iakovidou
- Tamer Karadağlı as Mustafa
- Başak Köklükaya as Saime
  - Gökçe Akyıldız as little Saime
- Tassos Bandis as Grandpa Vasilis
- Stelios Mainas as Uncle Aimilios
- Thodoros Exarhos as Thrasyvoulos
- Athinodoros Prousalis as Iordanis
- Kakia Panagiotou as Aunt Elpiniki
- Dina Mihailidou as Dorothea
- Themis Panou as Osman Beis

== Reception ==
=== Box office ===
Politiki Kouzina was released nationwide in Greece on Friday, 24 October 2003. It sold 62,091 admissions on its opening weekend (Friday-to-Sunday), with other reports putting it at an estimated 65,000 admissions, including 46,500 admissions in Athens. It went on to sell 33,000 admissions on a single day, 28 October, a national holiday. In Athens its second, third, and fourth weekends were well above its opening weekend in terms of admissions. It remained in first place there for 6 consecutive weekends, in the top 10 for 17 consecutive weekends.

By the end of its run Politiki Kouzina had sold more than 700,000 admissions in Athens alone out of a total of about 1,300,000 admissions nationwide setting a record among Greek films for the most admissions sold in Greece. As of September 2016 this record still stands. Politiki Kouzina also ranks as second best in terms of admissions among all films (Greek and foreign) behind Titanic. Other reports put the nationwide total at 1,600,000, 1,560,000 or 1,277,902 admissions.

== Awards ==
winner:

- 2003: Greek State Film Awards for Best Film
- 2003: Greek State Film Awards for Best Director (Tassos Boulmetis)
- 2003: Greek State Film Awards for Best Screenplay (Tassos Boulmetis)
- 2003: Greek State Film Awards for Best Music (Evanthia Reboutsika)
- 2003: Greek State Film Awards for Best Cinematography
- 2003: Greek State Film Awards for Best Editing
- 2003: Greek State Film Awards for Best Set Design
- 2003: Greek State Film Awards for Best Sound
