= El Greco (2007 film) =

2007 film by Yannis Smaragdis

- Directed by: Yannis Smaragdis
- Written by: Screenplay: Jackie Pavlenko; Yannis Smaragdis; Book: Dimitris Siatopoulos
- Produced by: Eleni Smaragdi; Raimon Masllorens; Dénes Szekeres; Georgios Fragkos
- Starring: Nick Clark Windo; Juan Diego Botto; Laia Marull; Lakis Lazopoulos; Dimitra Matsouka; Sotiris Moustakas†; Dina Konsta; Giorgos Christodoulou; Dimitris Kallivokas; Giorgos Charalampidis; Thodoris Zoumboulidis; Lida Protopsalti; Constantinos Isaias; Katerina Helmi; Fermi Reixach; Roger Coma
- Cinematography: Aris Stavrou
- Edited by: Giannis Tsitsopoulos
- Music by: Vangelis
- Distributed by: Audiovisual
- Release dates: 18 October 2007; 22 May 2009 (U.S.)
- Running time: 119 minutes
- Countries: Greece; Spain
- Languages: English, Greek, Spanish
- Box office: $8,246,050 Greece $674,095 Spain $3,493 Bulgaria

El Greco is a Greek-Spanish biographical film about the life of the Greek painter of the Spanish Renaissance, Domenicos Theotokopoulos, known worldwide as El Greco. Based on the fictionalised biographical novel, El Greco: o Zografos tou Theou (El Greco: the Painter of God), by Dimitris Siatopoulos, it was released in 2007, directed by Yannis Smaragdis and written by Jackie Pavlenko. The main cast features prominent contemporary Greek actors like Lakis Lazopoulos, Dimitra Matsouka and Dina Konsta, and includes popular actors of the Greek cinema of the 1960s such as Sotiris Moustakas and Katerina Helmi, who, along with Juan Diego Botto, Laia Marull and others, surround the leading actor, Nick Clark Windo, who portrays El Greco.

== Plot ==
The film tells a fictitious story of Domenicos Theotokopoulos, better known as El Greco, a great Greek artist of the 16th century with an uncompromising character, who sets off from his homeland Crete and goes to Venice and finally Toledo, in search of freedom and love. There he is confronted by his greatest adversary, the Spanish Inquisition, but his creative consciousness and power make him stand out and overcome barbarity and ignorance.

Being imprisoned and awaiting execution by the Spanish Inquisition, Domenicos (Nick Ashdon) writes out his story, thus parts of his life play out in extended flashbacks. Born on the island of Crete, which was at the time part of the Republic of Venice, he falls in love with Francesca (Dimitra Matsouka), daughter of the Venetian governor of Crete. But his father is preparing a political rebellion and as a result Domenicos leaves the island and moves to Venice, away from the young woman. There he meets the famous painter Titian (Sotiris Moustakas) and the Spanish priest Fernando Niño de Guevara (Juan Diego Botto). Guevara immediately shows a confused interest in Domenicos, and, when roiled by the Greek - and fighting personal demons - calls Domenicos before the Inquisition where he must defend himself against charges of heresy. It must be emphasized that the entire story is fictional, El Greco was never prosecuted by the Inquisition, but got well paid assignments from high-rank Inquisition leaders, like Fernando Niño de Guevara, Grand Inquisitor of Spain from 1600 to 1602.

== Cast ==
- Nick Ashdon as El Greco
- Juan Diego Botto as Fernando Niño de Guevara
- Laia Marull as Jeronima de las Cuevas
- Lakis Lazopoulos as Nicolos
- Dimitra Matsouka as Francesca
- † Sotiris Moustakas as Titian
- Dina Konsta as Maid
- Giorgos Christodoulou as Da Rimi
- Dimitris Kallivokas as Chacon
- Giorgos Charalampidis as Greco's father
- Thodoris Zoumboulidis as Manousos
- Lida Protopsalti as Carcadil's wife
- Katerina Helmi as Spanish noble woman
- Fermi Reixach as Don Miguel de las Cuevas
- Roger Coma as Paravicino
- Constantinos Isaias as Orgaz

== Soundtrack ==
An audio CD with the original soundtrack composed by Vangelis, El Greco Original Motion Picture Soundtrack, was released in Greece on December 20, 2007, by Universal Music Greece, only a few days after the international release of the 25th Anniversary edition of the Blade Runner soundtrack. It consists of 18 tracks, 15 of them composed by Vangelis while the other three involve source material from within the film. This is the third project by Vangelis regarding El Greco, following Foros Timis Ston Greco, an album released in 1995, and an expansion of it with three more tracks in 1998, titled El Greco.

== Reception ==
=== Awards ===
Winner:

- 2007: Greek State Film Awards for Best Film
- 2007: Greek State Film Awards for Best Director (Yannis Smaragdis)
- 2007: Greek State Film Awards for Best Cinematography (Aris Stavrou)
- 2007: Greek State Film Awards for Best Editing (Yannis Tsitsopoulos)
- 2007: Greek State Film Awards for Best Music (Vangelis)
- 2007: Greek State Film Awards for Best Set Decoration
- 2007: Greek State Film Awards for Best Sound
- 2007: Greek State Film Awards for Best Make up
- 2008: Cairo International Film Festival for Best Actor (Juan Diego Botto)
- 2009: Goya Awards for Best Costumes Design
