= Vangelis Mourikis =

Greek actor

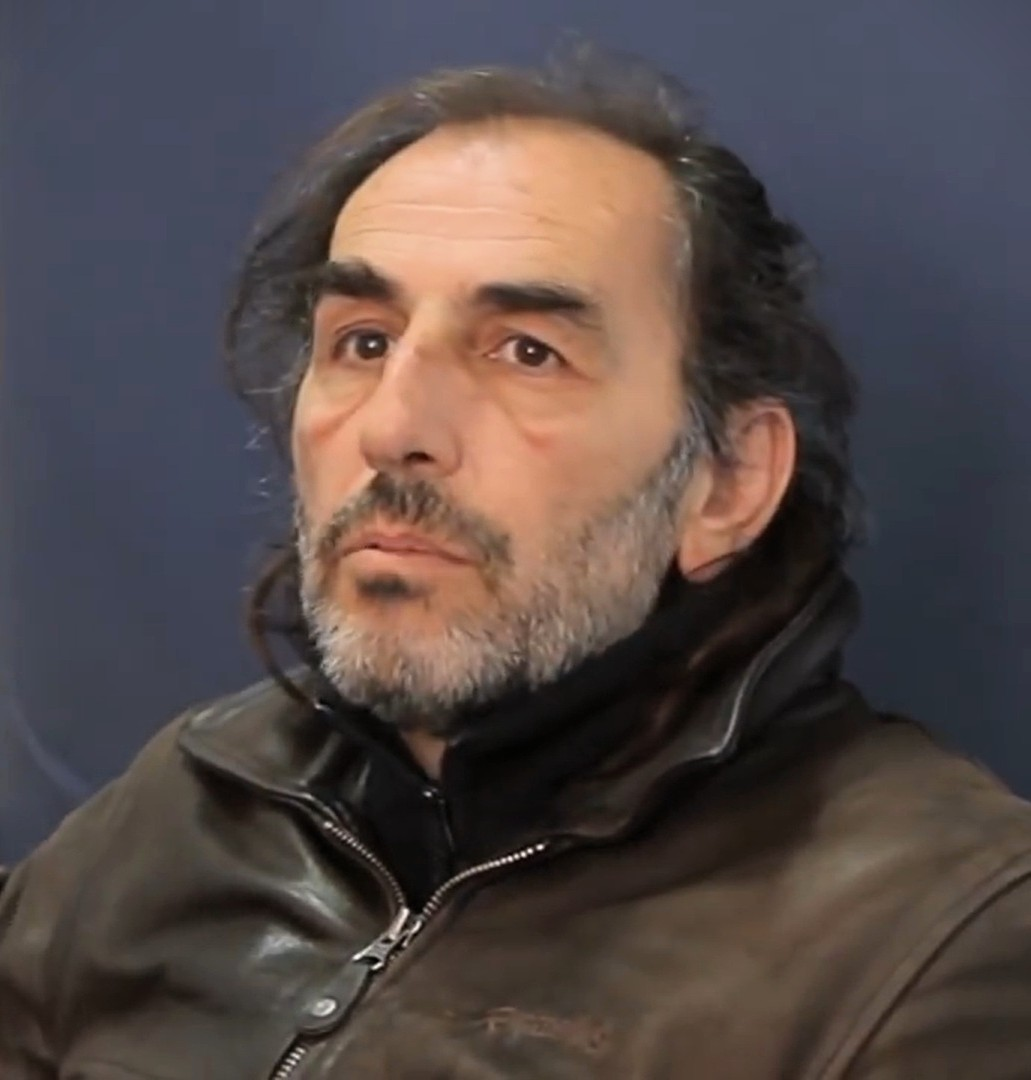
- Mourikis in 2014
- Born: 1963 (age 62–63); Athens, Greece
- Occupation: Actor
- Years active: 1982–present

Vangelis Mourikis (Greek: Βαγγέλης Μουρίκης; b. 1963) is a Greek film actor.

== Early life ==
Βοrn in Athens, Greece, in 1963, Mourikis found himself at a very young age in Australia, a place where some of his family's members had emigrated in decades past, (Note: An uncle of Mourikis was Christos Mourikis, reporter and owner of Australia's Greek-community newspaper New World. See Neos Kosmos, 2020.) working in various jobs and, as an adolescent, taking up at some point acting lessons; he appeared in theatrical plays staged by Greek expats. Mourikis made his Greek television debut in Thodoros Maragos "Emmones Idees" alongside Angelique Rockas

He made his film debut in the 1982 production Running On Empty, "a pretty silly but finally likeable and good humoured Aussie car flick," as the Filmnews review described it, which noted the "personable" onscreen presence of Mourikis in a "more-ethnic-than-thou performance."

== Career ==
Returning to Greece, he became known with his role in The truants, a 1996 movie featuring an ensemble of six young actors as old school friends who reunite every summer at the place where they grew up; they all shared the Best Supporting Actor award at the 27th Thessaloniki Film Festival.

In 2002, he was the lead in The King as the ex-convict who returns to his hometown and tries to fit in, in a performance said to be a "tour de force."

His performances in Rakushka (2004) and The Wake (2005) won him the Best Supporting Actor and Best Actor awards respectively at the Thessaloniki Film Festival.

For Georgis Grigorakis' 2020 Digger, winner of the 70th Berlin International Film Festival's CICAE award and other festival pizes, Mourikis was the farmer protagonist whose life is disturbed by a mining company's intrusion. He won the Best Actor award in the 26th Sarajevo Film Festival.

The 2024 fantasy drama Arcadia, described by a reviewer as a "dreamy, at times absurd fantasy, an aching, downbeat tale about loss and lingering grief," and by another as an "ambitiously spun script, the depth of which ultimately doesn’t live up to the superfluously complicated fable," featured Mourikis and Lanthimos regular Angeliki Papoulia as a couple heading off to a resort, whose "strongly internalized" performances were said to offer "a clean, restrained picture of grief."

== Selected filmography ==
Film
Title	Year	Role	Notes
Running On Empty	1982	Tony	Spotto a 57 Chev
Apontes	1996	Sakis	Winner for Best Supporting Actor, Thessaloniki Festival
The King	2002	Vangelis	Winner for Best Actor, Thessaloniki Festival
Rakushka	2004	Charis	Winner for Best Supporting Actor, Thessaloniki Festival
The Wake (Agrypnia)	2005	Andreas	Winner for Best Actor, Thessaloniki Festival
Soul Kicking	2006		
Stratos (To Mikro Psari)	2014	Stratos	Winner for Best Actor, Iris Awards
Digger	2020	Nikitas	World Premier at the 70th Berlin Film Festival; won Iris Award for Best Actor
Monday	2020	Takis	
Arcadia	2024	Yannis	World Premiere at the 74th Berlin International Film Festival
Psichi Vathia	2009	Capetan Ntoulas	

== Awards ==
Year	Award	Film	Result
1996	Greek State Awards for best supporting actor	Apontes	Won
2002	Greek State Awards for best actor	The King	Won
2004	Greek State Awards for best supporting actor	Rakushka	Won
2005	Greek State Awards for best actor	Agrypnia	Won
2014	Hellenic Film Academy Awards for best actor	Stratos	Won
2020	Sarajevo Film Festival - Best Actor	Digger	Won
2021	Hellenic Film Academy Award for Best Actor	Digger	Won
