= The Wake (2005 film) =

2005 film

- Directed by: Nikos Grammatikos
- Written by: Nikos Panayotopoulos; Nikos Grammatikos
- Produced by: Letta Andreadi
- Starring: Vangelis Mourikis
- Cinematography: Simos Sarketzis
- Release date: 31 October 2005
- Running time: 102 minutes
- Country: Greece
- Language: Greek

The Wake (Greek: Agrypnia) is a 2005 Greek drama film directed by Nikos Grammatikos. It was entered into the 28th Moscow International Film Festival.

== Cast ==
- Vangelis Mourikis as Andreas
- Michalis Tsourounakis as Nikos
- Aggeliki Dimitrakopoulou
- Iro Loupi as Maria
- Ersi Malikenzou
- Evagelia Samiotaki
- Dimitra Hatoupi as Adrianna
