= Peppermint (1999 film) =

- Directed by: Costas Kapakas
- Written by: Costas Kapakas
- Starring: Georges Corraface; Any Loulou; Alexandros Mylonas; Nikoletta Vlavianou; Tasos Palatzidis
- Cinematography: Giannis Daskalothanasis
- Edited by: Takis Yannopoulos
- Music by: Panagiotis Kalatzopoulos
- Release dates: November 18, 1999 (Thessaloniki International Film Festival); December 10, 1999 (Greece)
- Running time: 105 minutes
- Country: Greece
- Language: Greek

Peppermint is a 1999 Greek film directed by Costas Kapakas. It was Greece's submission to the 73rd Academy Awards for the Academy Award for Best Foreign Language Film, but was not accepted as a nominee.

== Plot ==
Old schoolmates attend a reunion party, and an aviation engineer amongst them takes a trip down memory lane. As he reminisces about his childhood and his extraordinary relationship with his cousin Marina, the viewer looks on the lives of the protagonists, taking a glimpse of the Greek society between 1955 and 1973.

== Cast ==
- Georges Corraface as Stefanos Karouzos
- Any Loulou as Alkistis Karouzou
- Alexandros Mylonas as Pavlos Karouzos
- Nikoletta Vlavianou as Ariadni
- Tasos Palatzidis as Michalakis
- Giorgos Gerontidakis-Sempetadelis as Stefanos Karouzos at 12
- Markella Pappa as Marina at 12

== Reception ==
=== Awards ===
Winner:

- 1999: Greek State Film Awards for Best Film
- 1999: Greek State Film Awards for Best Debut Director (Costas Kapakas)
- 1999: Greek State Film Awards for Best Screenplay (Costas Kapakas)
- 1999: Greek State Film Awards for Best Actress (Any Loulou)
- 1999: Greek State Film Awards for Best Supporting Actor (Tasos Palatzidis)
- 1999: Greek State Film Awards for Best Music (Panagiotis Kalatzopoulos)
- 1999: Greek State Film Awards for Best Editing
- 1999: Greek State Film Awards for Best Sound
- 1999: Greek State Film Awards for Best Make up

Nominated:

- 1999: Thessaloniki International Film Festival for Golden Alexander
- 2000: Academy Award for Best Foreign Language Film (Not Nominated)

== See also ==
- Cinema of Greece
- List of submissions to the 73rd Academy Awards for Best Foreign Language Film
