= Christos Vakalopoulos =

- Born: 17 January 1956; Athens, Greece
- Died: 29 January 1993 (aged 37); Athens, Greece
- Education: Athens University of Economics and Business University of Paris
- Occupations: Writer, director and broadcaster

Christos Vakalopoulos (Greek: Χρήστος Βακαλόπουλος) (Athens, 17 January 1956 - Athens, 29 January 1993) was a Greek writer, director, screenwriter and broadcaster.

His literary oeuvre is spiked with humour, plain vocabulary and brief sentences, related to the early works of Petros Tatsopoulos and Vangelis Raptopoulos.

According to the literary critic Dimosthenis Kourtovik, Christos Vakalopoulos illustrated the gradual development of some young people in Greece who passively experienced consumer culture and then embraced Greek Orthodox piety as an approach to life.

== Biography ==
Vakalopoulos was born in Athens. His father, George Vakalopoulos, as well as his mother, Xeni Vakalopoulos, were working at the Social Insurance Institute. He was raised in Kypseli and completed his secondary school education, attending Lycée Léonin in Patisia. He continued his studies from 1973 to 1980, studying Economics at the Athens University of Economics and Business. In the meantime, he became a member of the Greek Communist Youth Rigas Feraios and wrote articles for Thourios, the magazine of the organization. In 1975, he collaborated with the film journal Contemporary Cinema (Greek: Σύγχρονος Κινηματογράφος) and the newspaper I Avgi. In 1980, he wrote his first novel The Bestseller Case (Greek: Υπόθεση μπεστ-σέλερ), and went to Paris to study Cinema at the Sorbonne.

He returned to Athens in 1982 and started to work as a broadcaster. He hosted several radio programmes on the Second Programme and the Third Programme of the Hellenic Broadcasting Corporation. He, also, contributed to the screenplay of the telefilm The Cousins (Greek: Τα Ξαδέρφια) directed by Nikos Koutelidakis and the telefilm Νighttime Ιncident (Greek: Νυχτερινό Επεισόδιο) directed by Dimitris Panagiotatos. In 1984, he wrote his second novel The Graduates (Greek: Οι Πτυχιούχοι), and made his debut as a director with the short movie Verandas (Greek: Βεράντες). In the meantime, he was writing often articles for the political magazine Anti. In 1986, he directed the short movie Theatre (Greek: Θέατρο) influenced by French cinema and Éric Rohmer. Also, he contributed to the screenplay of the movie The Night With Silena (Greek: Η Νύχτα Με Τη Σιλένα), Regarding Vassilis (Greek: Σχετικά με τον Βασίλη) and The Woman Who Saw Dreams (Greek: Η γυναίκα που έβλεπε τα όνειρα). In 1989, the author wrote the series of short stories New Athenian Stories (Greek: Νέες Αθηναϊκές Ιστορίες). At the same time, Vakalopoulos directed Olga Robarts starring Olia Lazaridou and Antonis Kafetzopoulos. The film revolves around a female serial killer and a burglar who tries to expose her. The film won in the category of Best Cinematography at the Thessaloniki International Film Festival.

In 1990, Vakalopoulos published a collection of his articles about Cinema entitled Second Screening: Texts for Cinema (Greek: Δεύτερη Προβολή: Κείμενα για τον Κινηματογράφο). One year later, he published his last novel The Horizon Line (Greek: Η Γραμμή του Oρίζοντος). In 1992, Vakalopoulos together with Stavros Tsiolis directed Please Women, Do Not Cry (Greek: Παρακαλώ, γυναίκες, μην κλαίτε) starring Argyris Bakirtzis. The film won in the category of Best Screenplay and Best Director at the Thessaloniki International Film Festival.

Vakalopoulos died in Athens, on January 29, 1993, from lung cancer. He was buried at the Municipal Cemetery of Zografou.

== Filmography ==
- Verandas (Greek: Βεράντες), dir. by Christos Vakalopoulos (Greece, 1984)
- Theatre (Greek: Θέατρο), dir. by Christos Vakalopoulos (Greece, 1986)
- Olga Robarts (Greek: Όλγα Ρόμπαρντς), dir. by Christos Vakalopoulos (Greece, 1989)
- Please Women, Do Not Cry (Greek: Παρακαλώ, γυναίκες, μην κλαίτε), dir. by Christos Vakalopoulos and Stavros Tsiolis (Greece, 1992)

== Literary Works ==
- The Bestseller Case (Greek: Υπόθεση μπεστ-σέλερ). Thessaloniki: Υπό Σκέψιν. 1980.
- The Graduates (Greek: Οι Πτυχιούχοι). Athens: Ερατώ. 1984.
- New Athenian Stories (Greek: Νέες Aθηναϊκές Iστορίες). Athens: Εστία. 1989.
- The Horizon Line (Greek: Η Γραμμή του Oρίζοντος). Athens: Εστία. 1991.
