= Black Out p.s. Red Out =

1998 film

- Directed by: Menelaos Karamaghiolis
- Written by: Menelaos Karamaghiolis
- Starring: Alkis Kourkoulos
- Cinematography: Elias Kostandakopoulos
- Release date: 4 December 1998
- Running time: 160 minutes
- Country: Greece
- Language: Greek

Black Out p.s. Red Out is a 1998 Greek drama film directed by Menelaos Karamaghiolis. It was entered into the 21st Moscow International Film Festival.

== Cast ==
- Alkis Kourkoulos as Hristos
- Mirto Alikaki as Maria
- Kleon Gregoriadis as Stavros
- Hanna Schygulla as Martha
- Karyofyllia Karabeti as Ruth
- Dimitris Papaioannou as Lou
- Nikos Georgakis as Stavros
- Elena Nathanail as Hristos' Mother
- Kostas Apostolidis
- Stavros Mermighis
