= Tassos Boulmetis =

Greek film director, screenwriter and producer

- Τάσος Μπουλμέτης
- Born: 1957 (age 68–69); Constantinople, Turkey
- Education: University of Athens (Physics); UCLA (Film Production and Direction)
- Occupations: Film director, screenwriter, producer
- Years active: 1990–present
- Notable work: A Touch of Spice (2003)
- Website: boulmetis.gr/en/

Tassos Boulmetis (Greek: Τάσος Μπουλμέτης; born 1957) is a Greek film director, screenwriter, and producer known for his contributions to contemporary Greek cinema. His semi‑autobiographical film A Touch of Spice (2003) achieved both domestic and international acclaim.

== Early life and education ==
Boulmetis was born in 1957 in Constantinople, Turkey. In 1964 his family moved to Greece, where he earned a Physics degree at the University of Athens. He later received an Onassis Foundation scholarship to study film production and direction at UCLA, where he also served as a teaching assistant in directing.

== Career ==
=== Early work ===
After returning to Greece, Boulmetis directed and produced television programmes for state broadcasters. His feature debut, The Dream Factory (1990), which he wrote and co‑produced, won eight national awards and the Golden Award for Fantasy Movies at the Houston International Film Festival.

=== Breakthrough with A Touch of Spice ===
A Touch of Spice (Greek: Πολίτικη Κουζίνα, 2003) is a semi‑autobiographical drama about the Greek minority in Istanbul. It became one of the most successful Greek films ever (1.6 million admissions), released in over 45 countries. It won eight national awards and was Greece’s submission to the 77th Academy Awards for Best Foreign Language Film.

=== Later projects ===
His 2016 coming‑of‑age comedy Mythopathy (Greek: Νότιας) is set against Greece’s 1970s social and political changes; it won Best Feature Film at the Hellas Filmbox Berlin Festival in 2017.

In 2018 he directed the docufiction 1968, commemorating AEK Athens B.C.’s European Cup victory.

== Filmography ==
Year	Title	Role
1990	The Dream Factory	Director, writer, co‑producer
2003	A Touch of Spice	Director, writer
2016	Mythopathy	Director
2018	1968	Director

== Awards ==
- Eight national awards for The Dream Factory
- Golden Award for Fantasy Movies at the Houston International Film Festival
- Eight Greek awards of excellence for A Touch of Spice
- Best Feature Film at Hellas Filmbox Berlin Festival for Mythopathy
