= In Good Company (2000 film) =

In Good Company (Enas ki Enas)
- Directed by: Nikos Zapatinas
- Written by: Nikos Zapatinas
- Starring: Giorgos Kimoulis; Nikos Kalogeropoulos; Evelina Papoulia; Mimis Chrisomalis; Maria Protopappa
- Cinematography: Kostas Gikas
- Edited by: Yorgos Katsenis
- Music by: Lavrentis Machairitsas
- Release date: 2000
- Running time: 96 minutes
- Country: Greece
- Language: Greek

In Good Company (Greek: Ένας κι ένας / Enas & enas) is a 2000 Greek film directed by Nikos Zapatinas. It was Greece's submission to the 74th Academy Awards for the Academy Award for Best Foreign Language Film, but was not accepted as a nominee.

== Plot ==
Two men, Orestis and Pelopidas met on a car crash. Both have five days' leave. Orestis has got leave from the psychiatric clinic and Pelopidas from prison. Their course is crossed with a doctor and two policemen. The doctor is interested in Orestis and the policemen are interested in some stolen money. Thanks to an aunt of one of them, they manage to get away from the doctor and policemen who are watching them.

== Cast ==
- Giorgos Kimoulis as Orestis
- Nikos Kalogeropoulos as Pelopidas
- Evelina Papoulia as Catherine
- Mimis Chrisomalis as Doctor
- Maria Protopappa as Marina

== Reception ==
=== Awards ===
winner:

- 2000: Greek State Film Awards for Best Film
- 2000: Greek State Film Awards for Best Actor (Nikos Kalogeropoulos)
- 2000: Greek State Film Awards for Best Director (Nikos Zapatinas)
- 2000: Greek State Film Awards for Best Screenplay
- 2000: Greek State Film Awards for Best Costume Design
- 2000: Greek State Film Awards for Best Make up

nominated:

- 2001: Academy Award for Best Foreign Language Film (Not Nominated)

== See also ==
- Cinema of Greece
- List of submissions to the 74th Academy Awards for Best Foreign Language Film
