= Jaguar (1994 film) =

1994 film

- Directed by: Katerina Evangelakou
- Written by: Alexandros Kotzias
- Produced by: Katerina Evangelakou
- Starring: Nini Vosniakou
- Cinematography: Yorgos Argiroiliopoulos
- Release date: November 1994
- Running time: 79 minutes
- Country: Greece
- Language: Greek

Jaguar (Greek: Iagouaros) is a 1994 Greek drama film directed by Katerina Evangelakou. It was entered into the 19th Moscow International Film Festival.

== Cast ==
- Nini Vosniakou as Dimitra
- Ivonni Maltezou as Filio Kallimanopoulou
- Dimitris Katalifos as Ilias
- Akilas Karazisis as Andreas Kallimanopoulos
- Taxiarhis Hanos as Kostas
