= Christos Stergioglou =

Greek actor (born 1952)

- Χρήστος Στέργιογλου
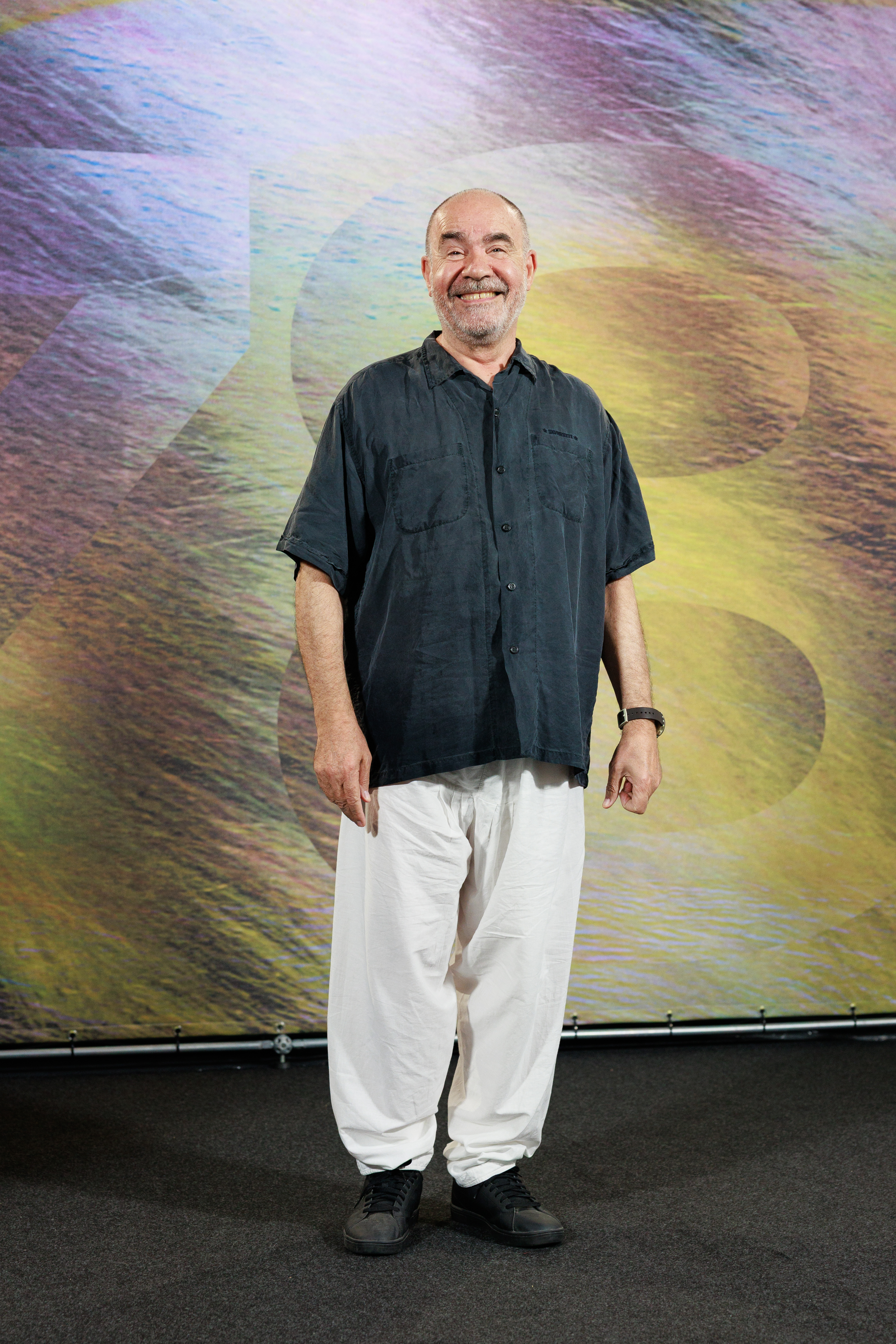
- Born: 5 February 1952 (age 74); Didymoteicho, Western Thrace, Greece
- Occupation: Actor
- Years active: 1981–present

Christos Stergioglou (Greek: Χρήστος Στέργιογλου; born 5 February 1952) is a Greek actor. He won the award for Best Actor at the 2002 Thessaloniki International Film Festival. He has appeared in more than 20 films since 1981. He starred in the Channel 4 sitcom Stath Lets Flats.

== Selected filmography ==
- Think It Over (2002)
- Dogtooth (2009)
- Unfair World (2011)
- The Eternal Return of Antonis Paraskevas (2013)
- September (2013)
- Stath Lets Flats (2018–2021)
