= Eduart =

- Theatrical release poster
- Directed by: Angeliki Antoniou
- Written by: Angeliki Antoniou
- Based on: Based on true events
- Produced by: Kostas Labropoulos, Jost Hering, Angeliki Antoniou
- Starring: Eshref Durmishi, Andre Hennicke
- Cinematography: Jürgen Jürges
- Release date: 25 November 2006
- Running time: 104 minutes
- Countries: Greece, Germany
- Languages: Albanian, German, Greek

Eduart is a 2006 Greek drama film directed by Angeliki Antoniou. It was Greece's submission to the 80th Academy Awards for the Academy Award for Best Foreign Language Film, but was not accepted as a nominee. It was also entered into the 29th Moscow International Film Festival.

== Cast ==
- Eshref Durmishi as Eduart
- André Hennicke as Christoph
- Ndriçim Xhepa as Raman
- Ermela Teli as Natasha
- Adrian Aziri as Elton
- Gazmend Gjokaj as Pedro
- Manos Vakousis as Giorgos Harisis
- Edi Mehana as Ali

== See also ==
- List of submissions to the 80th Academy Awards for Best Foreign Language Film
