= The Only Journey of His Life =

2001 film by Lakis Papastathis

- Author: Georgios Vizyinos
- Language: Greek
- Genre: Novel
- Publication date: 1884

The Only Journey of his Life (Greek: Το μόνον της ζωής του Ταξείδιον) is a short-novel of the Greek writer Georgios Vizyinos (also written Yeoryios Vizyinos), released in 1884. The novel was brought out in two parts in the magazine Estia on June and July 1884. The novel was adapted for the cinema, by director Lakis Papastathis in 2001 and for the theatre by director Dimos Avdeliodis in 2014.

== Plot ==
The story has a lot of autobiographical elements. The narrator of the story is a ten years boy from a village of Eastern Thrace. At the age of ten, he goes to Constantinople as an apprentice of a tailor. There, he expects to happen all that he had been narrated by his grandfather. However nothing notable happened and the boy loses his belief for his sweetheart person. One day the boy is alerted to go to his village to see his grandfather who is sick. The boy visits his grandfather and narrates him the journey in Constantinople, and asks him for his own journeys. Then he discovered that his grandfather had never gone a journey and all the stories he was saying were the fairy tales of his mother. Subsequently, the grandfather reveals to his grandson his childhood. As a child he was shut in his house until he married. The reason was that in those years, the Turks enlisted in the janissary army many children of Christians, obligatorily. The boys avoided the army if they had married. In his recitation, a complaint is distinguished for his only journey he was never completed. The next day the grandfather died thereby realizing the only journey of his life.

== Film adaptation ==
The film released in 2001 directed by Lakis Papastathis. The film stars Ilias Logothetis. It won the best film award in Greek State Film Awards, as well as other six awards in the same awards ceremony. It was also Greece's official Best Foreign Language Film submission at the 75th Academy Awards, but did not manage to receive a nomination. The cast stars Ilias Logothetis, Roula Pateraki, Lazaros Andreou and Ivonni Maltezou.

=== Reception ===
Winner:

- 2001: Greek State Film Awards for best film
- 2001: Greek State Film Awards for best cinematography (Giannis Daskalothanasis)
- 2001: Greek State Film Awards for best production design (Giorgos Georgiou)
- 2001: Greek State Film Awards for best music (Giorgos Papadakis)
- 2001: Greek State Film Awards for best sound
- 2001: Greek State Film Awards for best costumes design
- 2001: Greek State Film Awards for best make up

It was Greece's submission for the Academy Award for Best Foreign Language Film, but was not nominated.
