= Georges Corraface =

Greek-French actor (born 1952)

- Γιώργος Χωραφάς
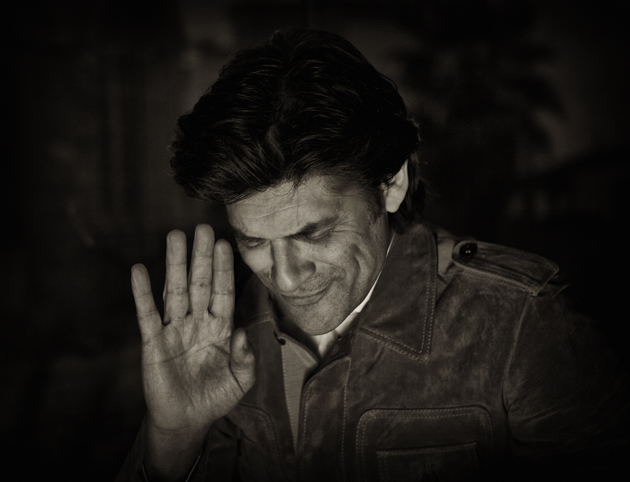
- Georges Corraface, president of the Thessaloniki International Film Festival in 2007.
- Born: 7 December 1952 (age 73); Paris, France
- Years active: 1983–present
- Website: corraface.net

Georges Corraface (Note: /ˈkɔːrəfɑːs/; French: [kɔʁafas]) (Greek: Γιώργος Χωραφάς, Giórgos Chorafás; (Note: Greek: [xoraˈfas]) born December 7, 1952, in Paris, France) is a French actor of Greek descent. He performed in film and television, following many years in French theatre, notably as a member of the International Center for Theatre Research under the direction of Peter Brook in the Peter Brook Company. His notable film credits include To Tama, Escape from L.A., La Pasión Turca, Vive La Mariée, Impromptu, Christopher Columbus, A Touch of Spice, and a feature film debut in The Mahabharata. His most popular television appearances include La Bicyclette Bleue, L'Été Rouge in France, The Young Indiana Jones Chronicles in the US and Drifting Cities in Greece.

== Biography ==
Georges Corraface is the son of the Greek symphonic and opera conductor, and violinist, Dimitri Chorafas, Cephalonian descendant of the Neapolitan Carafa family. His multi-cultural background enables him to work in French, Greek, English, Spanish, German and Italian, in roles ranging from dramatic leads to eccentric characterizations. He is most popular in France, Greece and Spain, by virtue of box office hits, best actor awards and television celebrity he enjoys in these countries. Corraface won The International Thessaloniki Thessaloniki Film Award in 1996 for Slaughter of the Cock and the State Award for Best Actor of the Year in 2001 for To Tama (Word of Honor). He was the president of the Thessaloniki International Film Festival from 2005 to 2010.

Returning to the stage in Paris, France, in 2011, he created the role of Hook in Pan a musical adaptation of Peter Pan directed by Irina Brook. In 2012, Georges Corraface starred in British independent feature film Papadopoulos & Sons in which he played the playful and larger-than-life "Uncle Spiros". The film was released in the UK through Cineworld on 5 April 2013.

In 2013, he wrote, directed and played in Burn Your House in Paris a play based on a selection of works by Nikos Kazantzakis, he also joined the tour The Other Side of Greece, a series of concerts in Paris, Brussels, Athens, with Filippos Pliatsikas and Babis Stokas and a number of outstanding artists.

He received the Nova Award for International Achievement at the 2013 Hellenic Film Academy Awards.

He is currently pursuing his career as an actor, as well as branching out in the area of fiction and documentary film production.

He lives in Paris, France with his wife and writing partner Rosalie and their two children (Zoe Corraface, an actress/singer, and Ilya Chorafas, a documentary film-maker) and works in film, television, and theatre.

== Selected credits ==
=== Film ===
- S.A.S. à San Salvador (1983, by Raoul Coutard) - Luis
- The French Revolution (1989, by Robert Enrico and Richard Heffron) - Hébert
- The Mahabharata (1990, TV Mini-Series, by Peter Brook) - Duryodhana
- Not Without My Daughter (1991, by Brian Guilbert) - Mohsen
- Impromptu (1990, by James Lapine) - Felicien Mallefille
- My Daughter Belongs to Me (1991, by Vivian Naefe) - Nikos
- Christopher Columbus: The Discovery (1992, by John Glen) - Christopher Columbus
- The Turkish Passion (1994, by Vicente Aranda) - Yamán
- Quartet in Four Movements (1994, by Lucia Rikaki) - Antonis
- Mor, vida meva (1996, by Mar Targarona) - Jota Sansvolonté
- Escape from L.A. (1996, by John Carpenter) - Cuervo Jones
- Slaughter of the Cock (1996, by Andreas Pantzis) - Evagoras
- Love, Math and Sex (1997, by Charlotte Silvera) - Jiri / theater director
- Minotaur (1997, by Jonathan Tamuz) - Nicos
- Long Live the Bride and the Liberation of Kurdistan (1997, by Hiner Saleem) .... Cheto
- Préférence (1998, by Grégoire Delacourt) - Max
- Algiers-Beirut: Remembrance (1998, by Merzak Allouache) - Rachid
- Peppermint (1999, by Kostas Kapakas) - Stefanos
- Km.0 (2000, by Juan Luis Iborra and Yolanda Garcia Serrano) - Gerardo
- Stand-by (2000, by Roch Stéphanik) - Le client dans le parking
- To Tama (World of Honor) (2001, by Andreas Pantzis) - Evagoras
- Reflections (2002 film) (2002, by Miguel Angel Vivas) - Jaime
- Girls Can Get Away with Anything (2002, by Charlotte Silvera) - Le pompier
- A Touch of Spice ("Πολίτικη Κουζίνα") (2003, by Tassos Boulmetis) - Fanis Iakovidis
- Chariton's Choir (I Horodia Tou Hariton) (2005, by Grigoris Karandinakis) - Chariton
- Camille des Lilas et les voleurs d'enfants (2005, by Jean-Louis Milesi) - Alain
- L'Ultimo Pulcinella (2008, by Maurizio Scaparro) - Commandant Richard
- Le Bal des Actrices (2009, by Maïwenn Le Besco) - Réalisateur Jeanne Balibar
- Dangerous Cooking (Epikindynes mageirikes) (2009, by Vassilis Tselemegos) - Damoklis
- The Prankster (2010, by Tony Vidal) - Nick Karas
- The Signature (2010, by Stelios Haralambopoulos) - Angelos Mavilis
- Without Borders (2011, by Nick Gaitatji) - Plato
- Papadopoulos & Sons (2012, by Marcus Markou) - Spiros Papadopoulos
- Joy and Sorrow of the Body (2013, by Andreas Pantzis) - Milen
- Family Harmony (2013, by Camille de Casabianca) - Jean
- The First Line (2014, by Coerte Voorhees, John Voorhees) - Michel
- Ursus (2015, by Otar Shamatava) - Jean-Pierre Jannaud
- Lolo (2015, by Julie Delpy) as Sakis
- Xamou (2016, by Clio Fanouraki) - Johnny
- Adults in the Room (2019, by Costa-Gavras) - Greek Ambassador France
- Super-héros malgré lui (2020, by Philippe Lachau) as Alain Belmont
- Ghosts of the Revolution (2020, by Thanos Anastopoulos) as Demetrio Carciotti
- Alibi.com 2 (2023, by Philippe Lachau) as Thierry
- Sugar and stars (2023, by Sébastien Tulard) as Charles Bauchon

=== Television ===
- Salut Champion, (1979), by Serge Friedman.
- The Bunker, (1980), by George Shaeffer.
- La Crêtoise, (1980), by Jean-Pierre Desagnat.
- Les Poneys Sauvages, (1982), by Robert Mazoyer.
- Two of Diamonds, (1984), by Bruno Gantillon.
- Drifting Cities (Cités à la dérive), (1884), by Robert Manthoulis.
- La Louve, (1987), by José Giovanni.
- War and Remembrance, (1988), by Dan Curtis.
- Fly By Night, (1991), by Bruno Gantillon.
- Navarro, (1991), by Patrick Jamain.
- Runaway Bay, (1991), by Jerry Mill.
- Inspector Morse, (1991), by Colin Gregg. As Claudio Battisti in Season 6, Episode 3: The Death of the Self
- Palace Guard, (1991), by George d'Amato.
- Le Petit Milliard, (1992), by Pierre Tchernia.
- The Young Indiana Jones Chronicles, (1992), by Mike Newell.
- Bambino Mio, (1993), by Edward Bennett.
- Le Château des oliviers, (1993), by Nicolas Gessner.
- Highlander (Saving Grace), (1993), by Ray Austin.
- The Scarlet and The Black, (1993), by Ben Bolt.
- Esperanza, (1994), by René Manzor.
- Barrage sur l'Orénoque, (1995), by Juan Buñuel.
- Strangers, (1995), by Eleanore Lindo.
- Une patronne de charme, (1996), by Bernard Uzan.
- Algiers-Beirut: A Souvenir, (1997), by Merzack Allouache.
- Only Love, (1998), by John Ermin.
- Winds of Passion (Tramontane), (1998), by Henri Helman.
- Algiers-Beirut: Remembrance (1998, by Merzak Allouache) - Rachid
- Toutes les femmes sont des déesses, (1999), by Marion Sarraut.
- Femme d'Honneur, (1999), by Gilles Béhat.
- The Teacher, (2000), by Henri Helman.
- The Dispossessed (Les Déracinés), (2000), by Jacques Renard.
- The Blue Bicycle, (2000), by Thierry Binistri.
- L'Emmerdeuse, (2001), by Mickael Perrotta.
- Écoute, Nicolas, (2002), by Roger Kahane.
- The Red Summer, (2002), by Gérard Marx.
- Alex Santana, negotiator, (2002–2004), by José Pinheiro.
- Disparitions, (2008), by Bruno Gantillon and Robin Davis - 12 episodes.
- Les Amants de l'ombre, (2009), by Philippe Niang.
- Les Associés, (2009), by Alain Berliner.
- Enquêtes Réservées, (2011), by Laurent Carceles.
- Section de Recherches, (2012), by Eric Leroux.
- One dead man too many, (2014), by Philippe Niang.
- The Permission, (2014), by Philippe Niang.
- Death in Paradise, (2015), episode 4.3 by James O'Neill.
- Clem, (2017–2018), by [Elsa Bennett, Hippolyte Dard, Nicolas Herdt] as Antinio.
- Commissaire Magellan, (2019), by [Gregory Ecale] as Claude.

=== Theatre ===
- Burn your House directed by Georges Corraface at The Maison de la Poésie.
- PAN directed by Irina Brook at the Théâtre de Paris.
- The Mahabharata, by Jean-Claude Carrière, directed by Peter Brook. Avignon Theatre Festival and Théâtre des Bouffes du Nord, European & world tour.
- The Tempest, by William Shakespeare, directed by Peter Brook. Théâtre des Bouffes du Nord.
- Sur le Fil, (On The Tightrope) - by Fernando Arrabal, directed by Pierre Constant. Avignon Theatre Festival: world premiere.
- Sur le Fil, (second version) - by Fernando Arrabal, directed by Jorge Lavelli.
- Blood Wedding, by Federico García Lorca, directed by Telmo Herrera. Lucernaire Théâtre..
- Antony and Cleopatra, by William Shakespeare, directed by Michel Cacoyannis. Athens Festival, with Irène Papas.
- Phedra, directed by Antoine Vitez. Conservatoire National d'Art Dramatique.
- Much Ado About Nothing et Beatrice & Benedicte, by William Shakespeare, The Berlioz Opera, directed by Jean-Louis Thamin. Berlioz Festival in Lyon.
- Dialogue with Leuco, by César Pavese, directed by Antoine Bourseiller. Petit Théâtre de l'Odéon .
- In Memphis, There is a Man of Prodigious Power, by Jean Audureau, directed by Henri Ronse. Théâtre de l'Odéon with Tania Torrens.
- The Taming of the Shrew, by William Shakespeare, directed by Gérard Le Breton, at the Shakespeare Festival. Georges Corraface as Petrucchio..
- The Merchant of Venice, by William Shakespeare, directed by Marcelle Tassencourt. Théâtre Édouard VII & tournée. Georges Corraface as Bassanio.
- The Just, by Albert Camus, directed by Marcelle Tassencourt
- Springtime Awakening, by Frank Wedekind, directed by Pierre Romain. Grasse Theatre Festival.
- Le Bleu du ciel, by Georges Bataille, directed by Serge Martin. Théâtre Malakoff à Rennes.
- Play It Again, Sam, by Woody Allen, directed by Bob Hranichny.
- The Sword and the Rose (La Rose et le Fer), by Patrick Schmitt.
- Hello Out There, by William Sarroyan, directed by Marcelle Tassencourt.

=== Producer ===
- Word of Honor (2001) Associate Producer.
- Chariton's Choir (2005) Associate Producer.
- The Signature (I Ypografi) (2011) Associate Producer.
- Adespota: Stray Dogs in the Heart of Athens (2013) Producer.
- The First Line (2014) Associate Producer.
- Xa Mou (2016) Associate Producer.
