= One Night for Love =

One Night for Love Rantevou/Radevou me mia agnosti Ραντεβού με μια άγνωστη
- Directed by: Vasilis Georgiadis
- Written by: Panos Kondelis
- Starring: Elena Nathanail; Giannis Voglis; Dimitris Murat; Anne Lonnberg; Lykourgos Kallergis; Periklis Christoforidis; Vasilis Andreopoulos
- Edited by: Memas Papadatos
- Music by: Christos Leontis
- Release date: 16 December 1968
- Running time: 92 minutes
- Country: Greece
- Language: Greek

One Night for Love or Appointment With an Unknown Woman (Greek: Rantevou me mia agnosti) is a 1968 Greek black and white drama film directed and written by Vasilis Georgiadis and starring Elena Nathanail, Giannis Voglis and Dimitris Murat. It was produced by Damaskinos-Michailidis.

== Cast ==
- Giannis Voglis ..... Alexis
- Elena Nathanael ..... Christina
- Dimitris Myrat ..... Christina's husband
- Lykourgos Kallergis ..... judge
- Periklis Christoforidis ..... police captain
- Anne Lonnberg ..... Eirini
- Vasilis Andreopoulos ..... lawyer
- Eva Angelidou ..... Katerina

== Awards ==
The film was awarded Best Actress at the 1968 Thessaloniki Film Festival.

== Information ==
- Also known as: Gia/Yia mia nychta/nihta erota (Για μια νύχτα έρωτα)
- Other titles:
  - Greek: Ραντεβού με μια άγνωστη
  - Italian: Appuntamento con una sconoscuita
- Tickets: 70,280 (74th out of 108 films that year)
