= List of submissions to the 41st Academy Awards for Best Foreign Language Film =

1968 Best Foreign Language Film submissions

Highlights
- Oscar winner: (Soviet Union) War and Peace
- Submissions: 18
- Debuts: none

This is a list of submissions to the 41st Academy Awards for Best Foreign Language Film. The Academy Award for Best Foreign Language Film was created in 1956 by the Academy of Motion Picture Arts and Sciences to honour non-English-speaking films produced outside the United States. The award is handed out annually, and is accepted by the winning film's director, although it is considered an award for the submitting country as a whole. Countries are invited by the Academy to submit their best films for competition according to strict rules, with only one film being accepted from each country.

For the 41st Academy Awards, eighteen films were submitted in the category Academy Award for Best Foreign Language Film. The titles five nominated films came from Czechoslovakia, France, Hungary, Italy and the Soviet Union.

The Soviet Union won for the first time with the 4-part epic film War and Peace by Sergei Bondarchuk. Becoming the longest feature film to ever win an Academy Award. The win took place during the peak of the Cold War, drawing worldwide attention.

== Submissions ==
Submitting country	Film title used in nomination	Original title	Language(s)	Director(s)	Result
Brazil	The Amorous Ones	As Amorosas	Brazilian Portuguese	Walter Hugo Khouri	Not nominated
Czechoslovakia	The Firemen's Ball	Horí, má panenko	Czech	Miloš Forman	Nominated
Denmark	People Meet and Sweet Music Fills the Heart	Människor möts och ljuv musik uppstår i hjärtat	Danish	Henning Carlsen	Not nominated
France	Stolen Kisses	Baisers volés	French	François Truffaut	Nominated
West Germany	Artists Under the Big Top: Perplexed	Die Artisten in der Zirkuskuppel: Ratlos	German	Alexander Kluge	Not nominated
Greece	Imperiale	Βυζαντινή Ραψωδία	Greek	Giorgos Skalenakis	Not nominated
Hungary	The Boys of Paul Street	A Pál-utcai fiúk	Hungarian	Zoltán Fábri	Nominated
India	Elder Sister	मझली दीदी	Hindi	Hrishikesh Mukherjee	Not nominated
Israel	Every Bastard a King	כל ממזר מלך	Hebrew	Uri Zohar	Not nominated
Italy	The Girl with the Pistol	La ragazza con la pistola	Italian	Mario Monicelli	Nominated
Japan	The Sands of Kurobe	黒部の太陽	Japanese	Kei Kumai	Not nominated
Poland	Matthew's Days	Zywot Mateusza	Polish	Witold Leszczyński	Not nominated
Romania	The Column	Columna	Romanian	Mircea Drăgan	Not nominated
Soviet Union	War and Peace	Война и мир	Russian	Sergei Bondarchuk	Won Academy Award
South Korea	Descendants of Cain	카인의 후예	Korean	Yu Hyun-mok	Not nominated
Spain	Spain Again	España otra vez	Spanish	Jaime Camino	Not nominated
Sweden	Shame	Skammen	Swedish	Ingmar Bergman	Not nominated
Yugoslavia	It Rains in My Village	Biće skoro propast sveta	Serbo-Croatian	Aleksandar Petrović	Not nominated

== Sources ==
- Margaret Herrick Library, Academy of Motion Picture Arts and Sciences
