= Visibility Zero =

Visibility Zero Ορατότης Μηδέν
- Film poster
- Directed by: Nikos Foskolos
- Written by: Nikos Foskolos
- Produced by: Finos Film
- Starring: Nikos Kourkoulos; Mary Chronopoulou
- Music by: Mimis Plessas
- Production company: Finos Film
- Release date: 5 January 1970
- Running time: 113 minutes
- Country: Greece
- Language: Greek

Visibility Zero (Greek: Ορατότης Μηδέν) is a 1970 film starring Nikos Kourkoulos and Mary Chronopoulou. The film's plot showcases the conflict between the working class and their employers.

== Plot ==
Angelos, played by Nikos Kourkoulos, is the sole survivor of the sinking of the steam ship Christina. When an inquiry is set up to investigate the circumstances of the disaster, Angelos testifies that the shipping company had neglected to properly maintain the ship and due to their negligence the coal-fired boiler exploded. When the enquiry reveals the improprieties of his company, the owner, Herodotus Richter, played by Spyros Kalogirou, takes his own life.

His brother, Horst Richter (played by Manos Katrakis), goes after Angelos seeking revenge for the death of his brother and also because of Angelos's testimony against his company. Angelos, however, develops a plan to infiltrate the company. He is successful at romancing the owner's daughter Christina Richter, played by Mary Chronopoulou, and they get engaged. He is then able to run the company. However, while at the helm of the organisation he discovers that the problems that caused the sinking of the Christina are endemic and persistent within the company. Disillusioned he abandons Richter and returns to his old love Niki.

In the climactic scene of the film, Angelos gets evicted from his home and his landlady throws all his belongings on the street. He puts a record on his record player, breaks an oil lantern, throws the fuel on the heap and lights up a cigarette burning his belongings in front of his neighbours, while the song of Stratos Dionysiou "Vrehei Fotia Stin Strata Mou" (It's raining fire in my way) plays in the background.

== Music ==
The song "Vrehei Fotia Stin Strata Mou" (It's raining fire in my way) was composed by Mimis Plessas with lyrics by Lefteris Papadopoulos. In a subsequent interview, Papadopoulos revealed that the writer Nikos Foskolos had asked him to write a song whose lyrics included the phrase "Kyma pikro stin plori mou" (A bitter wave on my bow). The song became one of the greatest hits of Greek laiko music of the era. Mimis Plessas chose Stratos Dionysiou as the singer. The hit launched Dionysiou's career; Dionysiou does not appear in the film, but his voice is heard from a record playing the song in the background.

== Impact ==
In one of the scenes of the film, while Angelos narrates the events that led to the disaster during the enquiry, he goes into an altered state and relives the scene that led to the boiler explosion. Realising that the pressure buildup, due to the malfunction of the pressure valves, would eventually lead to an explosion, he starts shouting to his shipmates not to throw any more coal to the boiler, exclaiming: Ohi allo karvouno! (No more coal! [Do not add any more coal to the ship's boiler!]). The expression Ohi allo karvouno! has since been used in Greek to describe extreme situations.

== Cast ==
- Nikos Kourkoulos as Angelos Kreouzis
- Mary Chronopoulou as Christina Richter
- Manos Katrakis as Horst Richter
- Spyros Kalogirou as Irodotos Richter
- Nikos Galanos as Kostis Kreouzis
- Anna Vagena as Niki
- Angelos Antonopoulos as Captain Nikolaou

== Release ==
The film premiered in Greece on 5 January 1970. With 640,720 issued, the film was second in popularity amongst 99 films in the 1970 season.
