= Abuse of Power (film) =

1971 film by Stavros Tsiolis

Abuse of Power Katahrisis exousias
- English film poster
- Directed by: Stavros Tsiolis
- Written by: Nikos Foskolos
- Produced by: Finos Film
- Starring: Nikos Kourkoulos
- Music by: Mimis Plessas
- Production company: Finos Film
- Release date: 23 March 1971
- Running time: 104 minutes
- Country: Greece
- Language: Greek

Abuse of Power (Greek: Κατάχρησις Εξουσίας) is a 1971 film directed by Stavros Tsiolis and starring Nikos Kourkoulos, Betty Livanou and Manos Katrakis.

== Plot ==
Nikos Kourkoulos plays Haridimos Tsiontis, a student who becomes a police detective and a member of the drug squad looking for the killers of his drug-addicted brother. His unconventional tactics get him into trouble with his superiors but they eventually relent and allow him to continue his investigation. The drug dealers discover his identity and force him to become a drug addict. In the end, Tsiontis recovers from his drug addiction and manages to get the drug kingpin arrested. His superior officer congratulates him and offers him a permanent job as a member of the drug squad but Tsiontis refuses and returns to his studies.

== Cast ==
- Nikos Kourkoulos as Charidimos Siontis / Stathis Theodorelos
- Betty Livanou as Eleni Apostolopoulou
- Manos Katrakis as Kanelos Vasilopoulos
- Spyros Kalogirou as Vasilis Apostolopoulos
- Giannis Argyris as boss
- Nassos Kedrakas as pub owner
- Andreas Filippidis as police chief
- Spyros Konstantopoulos as Peresiadis
- Dinos Karydis as Antonis

== Production ==
The film includes scenes from Thrace, e.g. at Lake Vistonida and at the Evros customs house.

== Release ==
The film premiered in Greece on 23 March 1971.

== Reception ==
Abuse of Power was the fourth most commercially successful film of 1971 in Greece.
