= Giorgos Vasiliou =

Giorgos Vasiliou may refer to:

- Giorgos Vasiliou (footballer)
- Giorgos Vasiliou (actor)
