= Giannis Voglis =

Greek actor (1937–2016)

- Γιάννης Βόγλης
- Born: Ioannis Gonglis; 30 September 1937; Athens, Greece
- Died: 20 April 2016 (aged 78); Athens, Greece
- Occupation: Actor
- Years active: 1960–2016

Giannis Voglis (Greek: Γιάννης Βόγλης; born Ioannis Gonglis, Ιωάννης Γκόγκλης; 30 September 1937 – 20 April 2016) was a Greek actor.

== Biography ==
Voglis was born in Athens and he studied at Pelos Katselis's drama school. His father was from Asia Minor and his mother from Andros. His first appearance in the theatre, was in the theatrical performance, I anodos tou Artouro in 1961, directed by Karolos Koun. He made his first appearance in film in the movie, I Iperifani. He became famous during the movie, Koritsia ston ilio (Girls In The Sun) in 1968. His most important role was in the movie, Blood on the Land by Vassilis Georgiadis.

Voglis appeared mainly in theatre along with other famous actors and actresses including, Elli Lambeti, Alekos Alexandrakis and Manos Katrakis. He was a member of the Anatoli company during the 1980s. He participated in many publications as a narrator, he was participated even in directing. In October 2009, he became an artistic member of DIPETHE Patras from the public council of the theatre. He met his wife Miranda, who was from Scotland, in 1959. They married and had two sons.

== Death ==
Voglis died on 20 April 2016, aged 78, in Athens.

== Filmography ==
=== Film ===
| Year | Film title (English translation) | Original title and transliteration |
|---|---|---|
| 1960 | Eroika | Ερόικα |
| 1962 | I Yperifanoi | Οι Υπερήφανοι |
| 1962 | Pagida | Παγίδα |
| 1963 | Petodas me ton Anemo | Πετώντας με τον Άνεμο; Fly With the Wind |
| 1963 | Stavraetoi | Σταυραετοί |
| 1964 | O krahtis | Ο κράχτης |
| 1965 | Kataigida | Καταιγίδα; Thunder |
| 1965 | Vromiki poli | Βρώμικη πόλη Dirty City |
| 1965 | To fylachto tis manas | Το φυλαχτό της μάνας |
| 1966 | Katigoro tous anthropous | Κατηγορώ τους ανθρώπους |
| 1966 | To choma vafthike kokkino | Το χώμα βάφτηκε κόκκινο |
| 1966 | Xehasmeni iroes | Ξεχασμένοι ήρωες Forgotten Heroes |
| 1966 | Epicheirisis Doureios Ippos | Επιχείρησις "Δούρειος Ίππος" |
| 1967 | Eriotes sti Lesvo | Έρωτες στη Λέσβο; Romance in Lesbos |
| 1968 | Koritsia ston ilio | Κορίτσια στον ήλιο |
| 1968 | I andres de liyizoun pote | Οι άνδρες δε λυγίζουν ποτέ |
| 1968 | Randevou me mia agnosti | Ραντεβού με μια άγνωστη Meeting with a Dumb Guy |
| 1969 | Enas magkas sta salonia | Ένας μάγκας στα σαλόνια A Gentlemen in the Family Room |
| 1969 | O blofatzis | Ο μπλοφατζής |
| 1970 | Erotas dichos synora | Έρωτας δίχως σύνορα |
| 1970 | O Gennaioi tou Vorra | Οι Γενναίοι του Βορρά |
| 1971 | I egoistes | Οι εγωιστές The Egoists |
| 1972 | Aera! Aera! Aera! | Αέρα! Αέρα! Αέρα! |
| 1973 | Orgia se timi efkairias | Όργια σε τιμή ευκαιρίας |
| 1973 | O valtos | Ο βάλτος |
| 1978 | Kravgi gynaikon | Κραυγή γυναικών |
| 1980 | Eleftherios Venizelos | 'Ελευθέριος Βενιζέλος |
| 1981 | Panic in the School | Πανικός στα σχολεία Panikos ta sholia |
| 1984 | Antistrofi metrissi | Αντίστροφη μέτρηση |
| 1987 | O efialtis | Ο εφιάλτης |
| 1987 | Glykia patrida | Γλυκιά πατρίδα |
| 1988 | I goitia tou hrimatos | Η γοητεία του χρήματος |
| 1989 | Epistrofi ap to htes | Επιστροφή απ' το χτες |
| 1991 | To meteoro vima tou pelargou | Το μετέωρο βήμα του πελαργού |
| 2001 | To tama | Το τάμα |
| 2001 | Beautiful People | - |
| 2007 | Poly milas... poly klais | Πολύ μιλάς... πολύ κλαις (you) Talk Too Much... (You) Cry Too Much |

=== Television ===
| Year | Film title (English translation) | Original title and transliteration |
|---|---|---|
| 1981 | Petros kai Pavlos | Πέτρος και Παύλος |
| 1981 | Methysmeni politeia | Μεθυσμένη πολιτεία |
| 1987 | To bourini | Το μπουρίνι |
| 1990 | O episkeptis tis omihlis | Ο επισκέπτης της ομίχλης Visitor in the Fog |
| 1990 | I dipsa | Η δίψα The Thirst |
| 1992 | Africa | - |
| 1992 | Tmima Ithon (episode: Misi Kardia) | Τμήμα Ηθών (Μισή καρδιά = Half Heart) |
| 1992 | East Wind | Ανατολικός άνεμος Anatolikos anemos |
| 1994 | The Silver Dinar | Το ασημένιο δηνάριο To assimario dinario |
| 1995 | Mireo pathos | Μοιραίο πάθος |
| 1995 | Mia zoi gia tin Elsa | Μια ζωή για την Έλσα; One Life for Elsa |
| 1995 | Anatomia enos egklimatos (episode: Night of Terror) | Ανατομία ενός εγκλήματος (Νύχτα τρόμου Nihta tromou) |
| 1997 | Psithyroi kardias | Ψίθυροι καρδιάς |
| 1997 | Angigma psychis | Άγγιγμα ψυχής |
| 1999 | Synora agapis | Σύνορα αγάπης |
| 2000 | Erotas Kleftis | Έρωτας κλέφτης |
| 2001 | Down from the Acropolis | Κάτω απ' την Ακρόπολη; Kato ap ton Akropoli |
| 2002 | I agapi irthe apo makrya | Η αγάπη ήρθε από μακρυά Love From Afar |
| 2003 | Akrovatontas | Ακροβατώντας |
| 2008 - 2012 | Se Fonto Kokkino | Σε Φόντο Κόκκινο |

=== Theatre ===
- I anodos tou Artouri Oui (The Resistible Rise of Arturo Ui)
- Hecuba
- The Persians (Πέρσες = Perses)
- Oedipus Rex
- Philoctetes (Φιλοκτήτης = Philoktetes)
- Peer Gynt
- Coriolanus
- Tiger Lillies
