= List of submissions to the 39th Academy Awards for Best Foreign Language Film =

1966 Best Foreign Language Film submissions

Highlights
- Oscar winner: (France) A Man and a Woman
- Submissions: 19
- Debuts: 1

This is a list of submissions to the 39th Academy Awards for Best Foreign Language Film. The Academy Award for Best Foreign Language Film was created in 1956 by the Academy of Motion Picture Arts and Sciences to honour non-English-speaking films produced outside the United States. The award is handed out annually, and is accepted by the winning film's director, although it is considered an award for the submitting country as a whole. Countries are invited by the Academy to submit their best films for competition according to strict rules, with only one film being accepted from each country.

For the 39th Academy Awards, nineteen films were submitted in the category Academy Award for Best Foreign Language Film. Romania submitted a film to the competition for the first time. The five nominated films came from Czechoslovakia, France, Italy, Poland and Yugoslavia.

France won for the seventh time with A Man and a Woman by Claude Lelouch, which also won for Best Story and Screenplay – Written Directly for the Screen, alongside nomination for Best Director and Best Actress (Anouk Aimée).

== Submissions ==
Submitting country	Film title used in nomination	Original title	Language(s)	Director(s)	Result
Czechoslovakia	Loves of a Blonde	Lásky jedné plavovlásky	Czech	Miloš Forman	Nominated
Denmark	Hunger	Sult	Swedish, Norwegian, Danish	Henning Carlsen	Not nominated
Egypt	Cairo 30	القاهرة 30	Arabic	Salah Abu Seif	Not nominated
France	A Man and a Woman	Un homme et une femme	French	Claude Lelouch	Won Academy Award
West Germany	Young Törless	Der junge Törless	German	Volker Schlöndorff	Not nominated
Greece	Queen of Clubs	Ντάμα σπαθί	Greek	Giorgos Skalenakis	Not nominated
Hong Kong	Come Drink with Me	大醉俠	Mandarin, Cantonese	King Hu	Not nominated
Hungary	The Round-Up	Szegénylegények	Hungarian	Miklós Jancsó	Not nominated
India	Amrapali	आम्रपाली	Hindi	Lekh Tandon	Not nominated
Israel	The Flying Matchmaker	שני קוני למל	Hebrew	Israel Becker	Not nominated
Italy	The Battle of Algiers	La Battaglia di Algeri	French, Arabic	Gillo Pontecorvo	Nominated
Japan	Koto	湖の琴	Japanese	Tomotaka Tasaka	Not nominated
Mexico	Black Wind	Viento negro	Spanish	Servando González	Not nominated
Poland	Pharaoh	Faraon	Polish	Jerzy Kawalerowicz	Nominated
Romania	The Uprising	Răscoala	Romanian	Mircea Mureșan	Not nominated
South Korea	Rice	쌀	Korean	Shin Sang-ok	Not nominated
Sweden	Persona		Swedish	Ingmar Bergman	Not nominated
Taiwan	The Silent Wife	哑女情深	Mandarin	Hsing Lee	Not nominated
Yugoslavia	Three	Tri	Serbo-Croatian	Aleksandar Petrović	Nominated

== Sources ==
- Margaret Herrick Library, Academy of Motion Picture Arts and Sciences
