= Andritsos =

Andritsos is a Greek surname. Notable people with the surname include:

- Kostas Andritsos (1916–1993), Greek film director and writer
- Liveris Andritsos (born 1959), Greek basketball player and coach
