= Aera! Aera! Aera! =

1972 film

- Directed by: Kostas Andritsos
- Written by: Dinos Dimopoulos; Lazaros Montanaris
- Produced by: Karayannis-Karatzopoulos
- Starring: Yannis Voglis; Xenia Kalogeropoulou; Petros Fyssoun; Giannis Gionakis; Anna Matzourani; Thanasis Mylonas; Christos Negas; Giorgos Papazisis; Alkis Yannakas
- Cinematography: Stelios Ramakis
- Edited by: Andreas Andreakis
- Music by: Kostas Kapnisis
- Release date: 1972
- Running time: 96 minutes
- Country: Greece
- Language: Greek

Aera! Aera! Aera! (Greek: Αέρα! Αέρα! Αέρα!; En. Hero Bunker) is a 1972 Greek feature film directed by Kostas Andritsos, starring Yannis Voglis and Xenia Kalogeropoulou. The plot concerns the opening phase of the Greco-Italian War in October/November 1940, with the protagonists caught up in the Italian invasion of Greece from Albania. The film belongs to a series of "patriotic" films shot during the Greek military junta of 1967–74. Its title derives from the popular Greek war cry of the time, "Aera!".

== Cast ==
- Giannis Voglis as Petros
- Christos Negas as Alexis
- Giannis Gionakis as Stratos
- Petros Fyssoun as Symeon
- Thanasis Mylonas as Notis
- Dimitris Bislanis as Stathis Giokas
