= Dancing the Sirtaki =

- Directed by: George Skalenakis
- Starring: Aliki Vougiouklaki; Dimitris Papamichael
- Release date: March 14, 1966
- Running time: 74 minutes
- Country: Greece
- Language: Greek

Dancing the Sirtaki (Greek: Διπλοπενιές) is a 1966 Greek musical film directed by George Skalenakis.

== Cast ==
- Aliki Vougiouklaki - Marina
- Dimitris Papamichael - Grigoris
- Vasilis Avlonitis - Vangelis
- Dionysis Papagiannopoulos - Lefteris
- Rika Dialina - Rita
- Aris Maliagros -
- Chronis Exarhakos - Kanelos (waiter)
