= Lampsi =

- Title card
- Η Λάμψη
- Genre: Soap opera
- Written by: Nikos Foskolos
- Directed by: Nikos Foskolos; Spyros Foskolos; Errikos Anagnostopoulos; Giannis Vasileiadis; Linos Christodoulou; Giorgos Voutsinos; Katerina Kokkinidou; Dimitris Koukoulomatis
- Starring: Christos Politis; Katia Dandoulaki; Nikos Apergis; Loukia Papadaki; Efi Pikoula; Alexandros Stavrou; Nikos Papadopoulos; Andreas Andreopoulos; Leonidas Kakouris; Tania Kapsali; Kalliopi Evaggelidou; Olga Tournaki
- Composer: Robert Williams
- Country of origin: Greece
- Original language: Greek
- No. of seasons: 14
- No. of episodes: 3,457

Original release
- Network: ANT1
- Release: September 16, 1991 – July 29, 2005

Lampsi (Greek: Η Λάμψη, English: The Shine) is the longest running series in Greek television, airing for more than fourteen years by the Greek television station ANT1 nearly every day.

Bulgarian television network Nova Television aired Lampsi, dubbed in Bulgarian from 2000 to 2010.

It began broadcasting on 16 September 1991 and the last episode was shown on 29 July 2005. In total 3,457 episodes were broadcast in 14 years. A total of 150,000 dialogues pages were written for 190 stories, involving 1,500 actors, seven directors and countless technicians.

The script was written by Nikos Foskolos, and Nikos Foskolos and Spyros Foskolos were among the series' directors.

== Cast and crew ==
=== Main cast ===
Main cast members
Actor	Character	Duration
Christos Politis	Giagkos Drakos	1991–2005
Katia Dandoulaki	Virna Drakou	1991–1998
Giorgos Vasiliou	Vasos Liossis	1991-1993
Loukia Papadaki	Sandra Rolandou Drakou	1991–1999, 2000-2003
Costas Spyropoulos	Alexis Drakos	1991–1996
Alexandros Stavrou	Alexis Drakos	1996–1997
Socrates Alafouzos	Alexis Drakos	1998–2000
Nikos Papadopoulos	Alexis Drakos	2000–2003
Dimitris Drakopoulos	Alexis Drakos	2003–2005
Costas Digkas	Renos Velmiras	1991–1994
Takis Anousis	Timos Drakos	1991–1992
Andreas Andreopoulos	Timos Drakos	1992–1996, 2003–2005
Leonidas Kakouris	Timos Drakos	1996–1998
Vangelis Rokos	Timos Drakos	1998–2003
Tania Kapsali	Tania Drakou	1991–1994
Kaliopi Euaggelidi	Tania Drakou	1995–2002
Mary Vlouty	Tania Drakou	2002–2004
Eleftheria Rigou	Tania Drakou	2004–2005
Christos Konstadopoulos	Sevos Drakos	1991–1993
Nikos Apergis	Sevos Drakos	1993–2005

=== Recurring cast ===
Recurring cast members
Actor	Character	Duration	Ref.
Eleni Kourkoula	Selini Laskou	1991-1993	
Giorgos Voutsinos	Giorgos Vourvahis	1991-1998	
Giorgos Christodoulou	Zachos / Angel Dorf	1991-1994	
Nandia Mourouzi	Semina Drakou	1991-1993	
Johnny Theodoridis	Stratos Foteinos	1991-2002	
Marina Psalti	Elvira Katakouzinou Foteinou	1991-1997	
Maria Giannopoulou	Anna Vediri	1991-1994	
Katerina Vakalopoulou	Katerina Balatsouka	1991-1995	
Elina Akritidou	Dora Vernikou	1991-1993	
Giorgos Mataragas	Efthimis Karaiskos	1991-1993	
Giorgos Petroheilos	Asteris	1991-1994	
Vanessa Ntzelve	Frida Molfesi	1991-1992	
Dimitra Zerva	Niki	1991-1992	
Maria Doka	Vera Oikonomidou	1991-1993	
Georgia Theodorou	Valeria Treskou	1991-2005	
Nora Katseli	Era Giannidi	1991-1997	
Elena Strati	Elena	1991-1992	
Jenny Balatsinou	Virna Drakou' s consciousness	1991-1993	
Christos Mantakas	Fanis Varveris	1991-1993	
Marianela Andreou	Vana	1991-1992	
Apostolos Sofianos	Errikos Vlantis	1991	
Giorgos Geogleris	minister Polychronopoulos	1991-1992	
Timos Perlegas	clown	1992	
Anestis Vlahos	Miltiadis Berkas	1992	
Nikos Panagiotounis	Klearchos Diminios / Philippos	1992, 2004	
Zaharias Rohas	Orpheas Diminios / prince Harvie Artouras / Lefteris Antonopoulos	1992–1993, 1999-2000, 2001–2002	
Agapi Manoura	Fani Berka	1992-1993	
Aggelos Provelegios	Iagos	1992-1993	
Martha Koumparou	Vera Serpieri	1992-1993	
Viky Protogeraki	Alexia Agrafiotou	1992-1993	
Giorgos Bellos	Agamemnon Agrafiotis	1992-1993	
Maria Nika	Renata Diminiou	1992-1993	
Bessy Argyraki	Bessy Argyriou	1992-1993	
Natasa Bozoni	Viky Romanou	1992-1993	
Marina Kourounioti	Marina Stathatou	1992-1993	
Dionysis Xanthos	Orestis Dervos	1992-1994	
Mania Tehritzoglou	Elena Drakou	1992-1994	
Martha Politou	Veronika Orphanidou	1992-1994	
Rania Hioni	Nefeli	1992-1994	
Despoina Drepania	Tesa Anagnostou	1992-1994	
Nena Chronopoulou	Nena Asimou	1992-1997	
Lina Markaki	Lilly Agrafiotou Drakou	1992-1997	
Alexandra Palaiologou	Vanda Vouvachi	1992-1997	
Evangelia Valsama	Vanda Vouvachi	1997-1998	
Phaedon Georgitsis	Annivas Katakouzinos	1992–1993, 1998-2000	
Vangelis Pantazis	investigatos Kapodistrias	1992-2000	
Giannis Napas	Vlassis	1992-2005	
Giannis Karatzogiannis	Vladimiros	1993	
Eleftheria Vidaki	Elli Dergou	1992-1993	
Christos Natsios	Selini' s father	1991	
Giannis Katranis	Stamos Rossoglou	1994	
Nikos Sideris	Manthos	1993-1994	
Athina Mavromati	Ekati	1994-1995	
Maraia Vouraki	Rena Vourou	1993-1998	
Lakis Komninos	Themis Palaiologos	1993-1994	
Kali Kalo	Chrysa	1994	
Georgia Zoi	Sandy Hasna	1994	
Marina Lambropoulou	Katia	1993-1994	
Nikos Vastardis	Christopher / Armagedon	1994-1995	
Andreas Douzos	Christopher' s boss	1994-1995	
Jenny Rousea	Vera Zagoritou	1994-1995	
Konstantina Koutsiou	Reggina Barkou	1994-1995	
Nikos Stagopoulos	Orestis Primaras / Stefanos	1995-1996	
Kaiti Papanika	Dora Katakouzinou	1994-1997	
Lila Moutsopoulou	Lila	1994-1997	
Mary Alifanti	Maria Sekeri	1994-1998	
Melissa Stoili	Martha / Melissa	1994-2000	
Varvara Kyritsi	Varvara	1994-2002	
Vangelis Voulgaridis	Manos Staramopoulos	1995	
Giorgos Siskos	Manos Staramopoulos	1995-1996	
Chloe Liaskou	Myrsini Kouvari	1995-1996	
Stella Papadimitriou	Ifigenia Vlastaki	1995-1996	
Manos Vakousis	Alkis Vourvahis	1995-1996	
Ariel Konstantinidi	Ariel Mavridi	1995	
Maria Xenoudaki	Dixi Straford	1995	
Christos Kaloou	Chris Patriarka	1995	
Olga Politou	Kleio Loverdou	1995-1997	
Eirini Velimachiti	Stefi Polychroniou	1995-1997	
Giorgos Papazisis	Papazois	1995-1997	
Giannis Vogiatzis	Bebis Prasinos	1995-2000	
Katerina Petousi	Persa Balatsouka	1995-2003	
Effie Pikoula	Effie Balatsouka	1995-2005	
Athina Tsilira	Nasia Balatsouka Foteinou	1995-1998	
Antonia Giannouli	Nasia Balatsouka Foteinou	1998-2005	
Daniel McVicar	Jesus	1996	
Nota Parousi	warden / Harikleia	1993–1994, 2001	
Konstantinos Manos	Erricos Seretis	1996	
Tonia Adamopoulou	psychiatrist	1996	
Telis Zotos	Aristotelis Seretis	1996-1997	
Nikos Galanos	Alkis Gerakaris	1996-1997	
Babis Chatzidakis	Kitsos Gerakaris	1996-1997	
Betty Valasi	Ifigenia Gerakari	1996-1997	
Christina Pappa	Armanda	1996-1997	
Evdokia Souvatzi	Elpiniki Hatzivergou	1996-1997	
Tasos Kontrafouris	Tolis Balatsoukas	1996-1997	
Stelios Geranis	Tolis Balatsoukas	1997-1999	
Christos Fotidis	Haris Vergotis	1996-1998	
Jenny Ioakimidou	Gina Liossi Drakou	1996-2000	
Takis Anousis	Linos Seretis	1996-2005	
Foteini Darra	Foteini Hiliopoulou	1997	
Maria Tsakalidou	Rousa Ventouri	1997-2000	
Dimitra Kalpaki	Dimitra Dori	1997-2000	
Jovana Frangouli	Sasa	1998-1999	
Arto Apartian	Hasan	1998-2000	
Theodora Siarkou	Leyla Ozgoun	1998-1999	
Giorgos Gorgis	Osman Barkiz	1998-2000	
Spyros Mavidis	Ferhat Barkiz / Castillio	1998–2000, 2001	
Olga Tournaki	Emine Barkiz	1998-2000	
Maria Diakoumakou	Fatme Barkiz	1998-2000	
Tryfon Karatzas	Nikiphoros Protonotarios	1998–1999, 2003	
Spyros Kouvardas	Souhri Ozgioun	1998-2000	
Vyron Kolasis	Niazit Ozgioun	1998-2000	
Giorgos Gorgis	police chief	2000-2003	
Andreas Charalambous	Maximos Delis	1999-2005	
Christina Theodoropoulou	Adigonia Archou Drakou	1998-2000	
Eirini Kakavouli	Virginia Theou	1998-2003	
Areti Zahariadou	Moira / miss Eleftheriou	2000-2004	
Marina Makri	advocate	1997-1998	
Kostas Terzakis	Peter Alex / Evlogitos / Ali Barkiz / Ion Romanos / Markos Angelidis	1997-2005	
Dimitris Bikiropoulos		1999	
Tasos Kostis	Imre	1999-2000	
Makis Revmatas	Vasilios / Karathodoros	1999-2000 / 2001	
Theodora Siarkou	Ellie	1999-2000	
Maria Drakopoulou	Sophia / Angela Pavlidi	1999–2000, 2004	
Tonia Kaziani	Kleio	1999-2000	
Mariza Georgitsi	Maria Veatriki	1999-2000	
Ioanna Tserkezidou	Varvara	2001-2003	
Iliana Sotou	Samantha	1998-2000	
Ifigenia Staikou	Fay Dragoumi / Nandia Velisariou / Linda	1998–1999, 2002-2003	
Anthi Iakovidou	Xenia Polychroniou	1999-2002	
Maria Diakoumakou	Martha Vernikou / Magda	2000–2001, 2003-2004	
Angela Emmanouilidou	Vasia Polychroniou	2000-2002	
Eleni Angelaki	Areti Staikou Drakou	2000-2004	
Fulman Mountanou	Dasy Desipri	2000-2005	
Fanis Mantzounis		2000-2005	
Elena Tsavalia	Evelina Kratsa / Elpida Venetakou	2000-2001	
Nikos Verlekis	Zisis Kyriakidis	2001	
Dimitris Topalidis	Stefos	2001	
Athanasia Antonarakou	Tatiana Drakou / Katia	2001	
Nandia Mourouzi	Christina Leventi	2001-2002	
Thanasis Zervas	Aris Leventis	2001-2002	
Georgia Zoi	Kleio Theodorou	2001-2002	
Vasiliki Agianopoulou	Laoura / Areti Drakou	2001–2002, 2003	
Giorgos Armadoros	Giorgos Armadelis	2001-2005	
Spyros Vrakas	young Giagkos Drakos	2000-2005	
Giota Tzouani		2002	
Eva Maria Leonardou	Vera Korizi	2002-2003	
Evi Rizou	Maria Leventi / Vilma Pronotariou	2001-2003	
Stergios Apostolinas	Renos / Angelos Ragousis	2002-2004	
Aggeliki Dimitrakopoulou	Vera Armata / Martha Antonopoulou	2002-2004	
Rafaella Aristopanou	Anna Katakouzinou	2002-2004	
Stella Konstantinidou		2003	
Triantafylli Bouterakou	secretary	2003-2004	
Babis Aronis	Savvas	2003-2005	
Katerina Gavala	Katerina Veikou Drakou / Gina	2003-2005	
Stamatis Gardelis	Rovertos Katakouzinos	2003-2005	
Stelios Danezios	Christoforos Kreouzis	2003-2005	
Ilias Stratakos	Makis	2004	
Rafaello Georgitsis	Sifis	2004	
Giannis Tosounidis	Fotis	2004	
Garyfalia Panagiotopoulou	Garyfalia	2004	
Aris Tsapis	Giagkos Drakos' grandson	2004	
Elena Kastana	Martha Angelidi	2004-2005	
Orpheas Zafeiropoulos	Tasos Angelidis	2004-2005	
Kalomira	Jennifer Drakou	2004-2005	
Natasa Kapsampeli	miss Smith	2004-2005	
Natalia Papaioannou	Nora Pavlidi Drakou	2004-2005	
Noni Ioannidou	Amalia Aggelidi	2004-2005	
Anna Pangeli	Ritsa	2004-2005	
Theofilos Vandoros	Odysseas	2005	
Christina Symeonidi	Christina Mourouzi / Linda	1996, 2005	
