= Ekeino to kalokairi =

Ekeino to kalokairi Εκείνο το καλοκαίρι
- Film poster
- Directed by: Vasilis Georgiadis
- Written by: Klearchos Konitsiotis; Panos Kontellis
- Produced by: Klearchos Konitsiotis
- Starring: Elena Nathanael; Lakis Komninos
- Music by: Giannis Spanos
- Production company: Klearchos Konitsiotis Film Productions
- Release date: 23 September 1971
- Running time: 77 minutes
- Country: Greece
- Language: Greek

Ekeino to kalokairi (Greek: Εκείνο το καλοκαίρι (That Summer)) is a 1971 Greek film starring Elena Nathanael and Lakis Komninos. It won the photography and music prizes at the 1971 Thessaloniki Festival of Greek Cinema. It was the Greek version of the successful 1970 American film Love Story. The film was one of the greatest successes of Elena Nathanael and the music of its soundtrack "haunted all the teenage parties of the 1970s". Its soundtrack features the hit song "San Me Koitas" (When You Look At Me) which has been described as "one of the most beautiful erotic songs of all time".

== Plot ==
A young woman invites her estranged husband Petros, played by Lakis Komninos, from London, where he works at the headquarters of her father's shipping company, back to their home in Greece. When he arrives, a beautiful vacation starts with his daughter, while the couple try to reconcile and solve their problems. As the story unfolds, and the couple seem to be drawing closer together, Petros is informed by his wife, played by Elena Nathanael, that she is dying of cancer and that he should take care of their daughter. In the final scenes, the couple embark on a scuba diving trip where the girl gets enmeshed in some underwater fishing nets. When Petros realises that his wife is not surfacing on time, he dives in and finally extracts her from the nets; but it is too late.

== Cast ==
- Elena Nathanael —The Woman
- Lakis Komninos — Petros
- Roula Christopoulou — Jenny
- Andreas Filippides — Doctor
- Vasilis Andreopoulos — Ship owner

== Production ==
Klearchos Konitsiotis wanted to take advantage of the box office success of the 1970s American film Love Story and gave Greek director Vassilis Georgiades the task of directing the film. Elena Nathanael was chosen due to her "melancholy beauty" and Lakis Komninos was given the role of her husband in the film because at the time he was one of the best looking Greek actors. The direction of Georgiades is good visually, succeeding in evoking the beauty of the summer coastline while capturing the "photogenic couple" as they irrevocably approach the tragic end of their relationship. The special effects of Nathanael's night crisis scene are very similar to Stanley Kubrick's 2001 A Space Odyssey.

== Reception ==
Phileleftheros News mentions that while the acting of the protagonists may not be the finest of their careers, the film is assisted by the photography and the soundtrack, featuring the hit song "San Me Koitas" (When You Look At Me) which has been described as "one of the most beautiful erotic songs of all time".

Athinorama comments that with the exception of Giannis Spanos's classic soundtrack, the film is a "bad copy of Love Story" which is "laughable in the ineffective way it presents its female star in her perfect make up in the 1970s kitsch lifestyle".

LiFO remarks that the film was one of the greatest film successes of Elena Nathanael and the music of its soundtrack "haunted all the teenage parties of the 1970s".

Finos Films states that Nathanael's performance in the film is considered to be her best.

To Ethnos notes that the film was one of the greatest successes of Nathanael, along with Operation Apollo. The film caused Lakis Komninos's career as an actor to "take off".

To Vima notes the "tragic irony" of Nathanael's role in the film, while later dying of cancer in real life.

== Release ==
The film premiered in Greece on 23 September 1971. During its release in the years 1971–1972 in Greece, the film sold 158,315 tickets which gave it 32nd place among 90 films.
