= Girls in the Sun =

1968 film

- Directed by: Vasilis Georgiadis
- Written by: Iakovos Kabanellis
- Produced by: Klearhos Konitsiotis
- Starring: Giannis Voglis; Anne Lonnberg
- Cinematography: Nikos Gardelis
- Music by: Stavros Xarhakos
- Release date: 1968
- Running time: 80 minutes
- Country: Greece
- Language: Greek

Girls in the Sun (Greek: Κορίτσια στον Ήλιο, translit. Koritsia ston Ilio) is a 1968 Greek drama film directed by Vasilis Georgiadis. The film was selected as the Greek entry for the Best Foreign Language Film at the 42nd Academy Awards, but was not accepted as a nominee. The film was nominated for the Golden Globe Award for Best Foreign Language Film.

== Plot ==
A young English tourist called Annabel meets a Greek shepherd during her vacation on a Greek Island. On their first encounter in a field, the shepherd approaches Annabel wanting to give her some almonds but scared of his rustic and rough appearance she misunderstands his intentions and runs away. Soon, he is found in prison accused of the supposed rape of Annabel. She regrets overreacting and tries to persuade the authorities to release him. Gradually, they fall in love and after being released from prison he follows her to Athens but she must return home and it seems that their innocent love doesn't have a future.

== Cast ==
- Giannis Voglis as The Shepherd
- Anne Lonnberg as Annabel Stone
- Kostas Bakas as Police Officer
- Miranta Myrat as Mrs. Fragopoulou
- Vangelis Kazan as Hotel Receptionist
- Elpida Braoudaki as Annabel's Friend
- Vagelis Sakainas as Giorgos

== Awards ==
List of awards and nominations
Award	Category	Recipients and nominees	Result
1969 Golden Globe Awards	Best Foreign Language Film	Vasilis Georgiadis	Nominated
1968 Thessaloniki Film Festival	Best Film	Vasilis Georgiadis	Won
1968 Thessaloniki Film Festival	Best Music	Stavros Xarhakos	Won
1968 Thessaloniki Film Festival	Best Supporting Actor	Kostas Mpakas	Won

== See also ==
- List of submissions to the 42nd Academy Awards for Best Foreign Language Film
- List of Greek submissions for the Academy Award for Best Foreign Language Film
