= Illya Darling =

- Original Cast Recording
- Music: Manos Hadjidakis
- Lyrics: Joe Darion
- Book: Jules Dassin
- Basis: Jules Dassin's film Never on Sunday
- Productions: 1967 Broadway; 1968 First National Tour

Illya Darling is a musical with a book by Jules Dassin, music by Manos Hadjidakis, and lyrics by Joe Darion, based on Dassin's 1960 film Never on Sunday.

== Production ==
The show previewed in a tour of Philadelphia, Toronto and Detroit for nine weeks. After 22 previews, the Broadway production opened on April 11, 1967 at the Mark Hellinger Theatre and closed on January 13, 1968, after 320 performances and 22 previews. It was directed by Dassin, choreographed by Onna White, with scenic design by Oliver Smith, costume design by Theoni V. Aldredge, and lighting design by Jean Rosenthal. Orchestra was conducted by Karen Gustafson.

Attendance was fueled by the star wattage provided by Melina Mercouri, who was nominated for a Tony Award, in the title role. She had starred in the film, which managed to overcome the mostly lukewarm to negative reviews. Critics found the plot too slight.

Other cast members included Orson Bean as Homer Thrace, Nikos Kourkoulos (who was also nominated for a Tony) in his Broadway debut as Tonio, and Hal Linden as No Face. After closing on Broadway, the show went on tour with Cyd Charisse as Illya. Nat Horne was a featured dancer in the production.

The production was nominated for six Tony Awards, including Best musical, score, direction and choreography, but it did not win any.

The musical was presented by the Greek American Theatre Company of Los Angeles, running March 2003 to May 2003.

== Synopsis ==
Illya, a carefree prostitute, plies her trade in the port town of Piraeus outside Athens. With no set rates, no pimp, and an inclination to sleep only with men she likes, she differs dramatically from the other local ladies-of-the-evening. Their pimp, Garbage, works for the mysterious No Face, who charges the girls exorbitant rents. Into her life comes Homer Thrace, a priggish American in search of the glories of Ancient Greece. Attracted by Illya's physical charms, he decides to teach her about the classics and to help her become a cultured lady, while she in turn introduces him to sensual pleasures. Homer's lesson plan is to separate her from her friends and the virile Tonio. Neither ends up happier.

== Original cast and characters ==
Character	Broadway (1967)	First National Tour (1968)
Illya	Melina Mercouri	Cyd Charisse
Homer Thrace	Orson Bean	Jon Cypher
Tonio	Nikos Kourkoulos	Raul Julia
Mr. No Face	Hal Linden	William Mooney
Captain	Rudy Bond	Rudy Bond
Despo	Despo	Lou Rodgers
Vassily	Joe E. Marks	Joe E. Marks
Yorgos	Titos Vandis	Titos Vandis
Garbage Man	William Duell	Joe Alfasa
Waiter	Harold Gary	Jay Kirsch

== Song list ==
Act I

- Po, Po, Po – Homer Thrace and Tonio
- Dance – Ensemble
- Zebekiko – Yorgo
- Piraeus, My Love – Illya and Men
- Golden Land – Homer Thrace and Ensemble
- Zebekiko (Reprise) – Yorgo
- Love, Love, Love – Illya
- I Think She Needs Me – Homer Thrace
- I'll Never Lay Down Any More – Despo
- After Love – Tonio
- Birthday Song – Tonio, Captain and Men
- Medea Tango – Illya and Men
- Illya Darling – Illya, Yorgo and Ensemble

Act 2

- Dear Mr. Schubert – Illya [This song is based on the 5th movement of Schubert's Quartet for Flute, Viola, Guitar and Cello in G Major, D. 96 (Anh. II, 2). Source: DGG CD 431 783–2. Schubert based the work on a Notturno for Flute, Viola and Guitar by Wenzel Matiegka. The 5th movement theme was itself after a song by Friedrich Fleischmann.]
- The Lesson – Illya and Homer Thrace
- Never on Sunday – Illya and Ensemble
- Piraeus, My Love (Reprise) – Illya
- Heaven Help A Sailor – Male Ensemble
- Medea Tango (Reprise) – Tonio
- Dance – Illya, Homer Thrace, Yorgo, Tonio, Captain, Vassily, Waiter and Ensemble
- Ya Chara – Company

== Response ==
Jack Gaver wrote that although there were attractive things about the musical "it is a fact that any commercial success this new musical may have depends largely upon public interest in its Greek star. Tuesday night's arrival at the Mark Hellinger Theatre lacks solid, over-all appeal, so the international reputation of Miss Mercouri as a movie star with a tremendous sex image and a volatile acting style is really on the line ... there is exuberance in the several dance numbers, the score has some rousing numbers and there are excellent portrayals in top roles."

According to Steven Suskin, the musical was "the season's biggest star-vehicle with the biggest advance sale: Melina Mercouri in the Never on Sunday musical, Illya Darling. Not so darling, as it turned out; the charm of the 1960 low-budget Greek-language film was overblown into a full-scale Broadway affair with a distinct lack of charm or skill."

== Awards and nominations ==
=== Original Broadway production ===
Year	Award	Category	Nominee	Result
1968	Tony Award	Best Musical		Nominated
1968	Tony Award	Best Composer and Lyricist	Manos Hadjidakis and Joe Darion	Nominated
1968	Tony Award	Best Performance by a Leading Actress in a Musical	Melina Mercouri	Nominated
1968	Tony Award	Best Performance by a Featured Actor in a Musical	Nikos Kourkoulos	Nominated
1968	Tony Award	Best Direction of a Musical	Jules Dassin	Nominated
1968	Tony Award	Best Choreography	Onna White	Nominated
