= Imperiale =

1968 film

- Directed by: George Skalenakis
- Written by: Giannis Tziotis
- Produced by: Thodoros Roubanis
- Starring: Kostas Karras
- Release date: 1968
- Running time: 90 minutes
- Country: Greece
- Language: Greek

Imperiale (Greek: Βυζαντινή Ραψωδία, translit. Vyzantini rapsodia) is a 1968 Greek drama film directed by George Skalenakis. The film was selected as the Greek entry for the Best Foreign Language Film at the 41st Academy Awards, but was not accepted as a nominee.

== Cast ==
- Kostas Karras as Emperor
- Betty Arvaniti as Zoi
- Thodoros Roubanis as (as Theodoros Roubanis)
- Yanis Alexandridis
- Giorgos Oikonomou
- Venia Palliri
- Christos Parlas
- Yannis Totsikas
- Nikos Tsachiridis
- Giorgos Zaifidis
- Hristoforos Zikas
- Christos Zorbas

== See also ==
- List of submissions to the 41st Academy Awards for Best Foreign Language Film
- List of Greek submissions for the Academy Award for Best Foreign Language Film
