= Eleftherios Venizelos (film) =

Eleftherios Venizelos Ελευθέριος Βενιζέλος
- Directed by: Pantelis Voulgaris
- Written by: Pantelis Voulgaris
- Produced by: Giorgos Iakovidis; Michalis Lambrinos
- Starring: Minas Christidis; Giannis Voglis; Dimitris Myrat; Manos Katrakis; Olga Karlatos
- Music by: Loukianos Kilaidonis
- Distributed by: Mer Film
- Release date: 1980
- Running time: 175 minutes
- Country: Greece
- Language: Greek

Eleftherios Venizelos 1910–1927 (Greek: Ελευθέριος Βενιζέλος) is a 1980 Greek biographical film of one of the most famous leaders of the Greek political scene of the 20th century Eleftherios Venizelos. The film stars Dimitris Myrat, Manos Katrakis and Anna Kalouta.

== Plot ==
The story was set in August 1909 when the film introduces Venizelos' ideas and Venizelism for a larger Greece. It describes the capture of Thessaloniki and Ioannina and later the National Schism and up to the impending war in Europe, World War I. Venizelos resigned from the political life after the tie in the elections that followed the Asia Minor Catastrophe and returned to his relatives in Crete.

== Cast ==
- Minas Christidis .... Eleftherios Venizelos
- Giannis Voglis .... King Constantine I of Greece
- Dimitris Myrat .... King George I of Greece
- Manos Katrakis .... Petros
- Olga Karlatos .... Queen Sophia of Greece
- Anna Kalouta .... actress
- Stavros Xenidis .... Emmanouil Repoulis
- Vasilis Diamantopoulos .... Apostolos
- Gregoris Valtinos .... officer
