= Kostas Karras =

Greek actor and politician

Kostas Karras (Greek: Κώστας Καρράς) (21 June 1936 – 6 May 2012) was a Greek actor and politician.

== Biography ==
Karras was born in Athens. Ηe trained as an actor at the drama school of the National Theatre of Greece and graduated from the drama school of Pelos Katselis. After making his screen debut in 1961, he played in the theatre and in many films, for the Greek cinema for 39 years.

Karras was a member of the Hellenic Parliament from 2000 to 2007, representing the New Democracy party.

== Filmography ==
- Imperiale (1968)
- The Parisian (1969)
- Ipolochagos Natassa (1970)
- Iphigenia (1977)
