= Giorgos Vasiliou (actor) =

Greek actor, politician, and footballer

- Born: June 21, 1950; Lamia, Greece
- Died: November 2, 2016 (aged 66); Salamina, Greece
- Occupations: Actor, footballer, politician
- Years active: 1980-2016
- Spouse: Lia Thermogianni (m. 1977)
- Children: 2

Giorgos Vasiliou (Greek: Γιώργος Βασιλείου; June 21, 1950 – November 2, 2016) was a Greek actor, politician and former footballer. He was also a deputy in the Second Piraeus Region with the New Democracy party from 2004 to 2007 and honorary president of the Charity Department of Cooperative Savings in Larnaca, Cyprus.

== Biography ==
He was born in Lamia, Greece in 1950. As a child, Vasilou worked at various jobs, along with school. Vasileiou was also playing soccer with PAS Lamia 1964 and he was goalkeeper. During 1970–71 season, he faced AEK Athens F.C. Despite the 1–4 defeat, AEK wanted to join him, but the proposal was declined by his club. That led him to retire from soccer. He studied at the Drama School of Giorgos Bellos where he graduated with honors. On 17 November 1973, during the Athens Polytechnic uprising in 1973, he met his wife, Lia Thermogianni, then a student of Athens Law School, whom he married four years later and had two children.

He has worked alongside Thanasis Vengos, Rena Vlachopoulou and other great names in Greek theatre. In the early 1990s, and after many appearances in plays, movies and television shows, he met Nikos Foskolos, who has since called Vasilou teacher and who confided important roles, most notably that of Stathis Theocharis in the daily series Καλημέρα Ζωή.

During the Greek parliamentary elections of 2004, he was elected by the New Democracy party for deputy. Since 2007, after being deputy in parliament, he continued to work in theater and television. In November 2011, he announced his membership in the Democratic Alliance party and was a resident in the constituency of Piraeus. During the last 12 years of his life, he resided in Salamina with his wife.

He had taken part, and has starred in, many plays and television productions and movies. He also has given his voice to many compilations and children's productions, and has taught at Tragas Drama School.

He died of lung cancer in Salamina on 2 November 2016, after a short illness.

== Filmography ==
1980	Τώρα θέλω, τώρα
1980	Ο παρθενοκυνηγός
1980	Ρένα, να η ευκαιρία
1981	Τα καμάκια
1981	Το ξένο είναι πιο γλυκό
1986	Ράκος ... Νο 14 : και ο πρώτος μπουνάκιας
1988	Ο μεγάλος παραμυθάς
1988	Ο κοντός και οι μνηστήρες
1989	Ο πρωτάρης μπάτσος και η τροτέζα
2002	The Bubble

== Videos ==
1986	Η κολπατζού
1986	Ο μαφιόζος
1986	Ο γυφτοροκάς
1986	Ο Εμμανουέλος
1986	Ο παρθενοφάγος
1986	Πονηρός ο βλάχος
1986	Ο φίκος μου ο Νίντζα
1986	Αρέσω και κυκλοφορώ
1986	Ο σωφέρ και το μανούλι
1986	Ο τελευταίος γυφτοκράτορας
1986	Πολιτσ΄μάνα του σαματά η μάνα
1986	Οι σκληρές της πενιάς και του ροκ
1987	Η φλόγα
1987	Τα ντερέκια
1987	Ο λαχειοπώλης
1987	Μπουνιά και συχώριο
1987	Ο κουρδιστός εραστής
1987	Μαρκησία του λιμανιού
1987	Ο άρχοντας της λιγούρας
1987	Μια νύχτα στο τμήμα ηθών
1987	Η ψεύτρα από το Κατάκωλο
1987	Η γυναίκα της πρώτης σελίδας
1987	Η μικρομεσαία των μπάτσων σχολή
1987	Πράσινα, μπλε και κόκκινα καρύδια
1987	Το 'πε, το ΄πε ο παπαγάλος, είσαι κόκορας μεγάλος
1988	Το ρεπορτάζ
1988	Οι συνένοχοι
1988	Εκείνη η γυναίκα
1988	Ο ερωτόγυφτος με το Ντάτσουν
1989	Γύφτος και γοητεία
1989	Ο σύντροφος και ο μπάτσος
1989	Άβε Μαφία ...: Εθνική Ακαδημία Απατεώνων
1990	Ο χαρτοπαίχτης
1990	Ο Ταμπάκος ζει
1990	Άγαμοι και θύτες

== Television series ==
1972	Η Γειτονιά μας	ΥΕΝΕΔ
1972	Χαρούμενη Κυριακή	ΕΡΤ
1973	Εν τούτω νίκα	ΥΕΝΕΔ
1974	Γυφτοπούλα	ΥΕΝΕΔ
1975	Η Θέμις έχει νεύρα	ΕΡΤ
1978	Ναυτικές ιστορίες	ΥΕΝΕΔ
1980	Αργώ	ΕΡΤ
1982	Ορκιστείτε παρακαλώ	ΥΕΝΕΔ
1983	Οι ιερόσυλοι	ΕΡΤ2
1986	Η βεντέτα	ΕΡΤ2
1988	Οδός Ανθέων	ΕΤ1
1990	Ο χαρτοπαίχτης	ΕΤ1
1990	Η γυναίκα της πρώτης σελίδας	MEGA
1991	Lampsi	ΑΝΤ1
1992	Πλάκας μέλαθλον	ΑΝΤ1
1992	Τα καλά παιδιά	ΑΝΤ1
1992	Ο εκβιαστής	ΑΝΤ1
1992	Η Ελίζα και οι άλλοι	MEGA
1993	Εκλογή	ΑΝΤ1
1993	Αγαπάτε αλλήλους	ΑΝΤ1
1994	Καλώς ήλθες μαζί μας	ΑΝΤ1
1993-2006	Kalimera Zoi	ΑΝΤ1
2002	Οι στάβλοι της Εριέτας Ζαϊμη	ΑΝΤ1

== Video theatres ==
1985	Ο ουρανοκατέβατος	ΕΡΤ
1985	Η χαρτοπαίχτρα	ΕΡΤ
1986	Μπράβο Κολλονέλο	ΕΡΤ2
1994	Πόρνες και πόρνες	ΑΝΤ1
2002	Δυο γάμοι και μια μοιχεία	ΑΝΤ1
2004	Πολιτική κουζίνα	STAR
2004	Τα ... λαμόγια	ΑΝΤ1

== Dubbed productions ==
1983	Το θαυμάσιο ταξίδι του Νιλς Χόλγκερσον	ΕΡΤ
1983	Candy Candy	ΕΡΤ
1985	Τάο - Τάο	ΕΡΤ
1985	Inspector Gadget	ΕΤ1
1988	Ντένις ο τρομερός	ΕΤ1

== Sources ==
- Αθηναϊκό-Μακεδονικό Πρακτορείο Ειδήσεων:«Έφυγε» απο τη ζωή ο ηθοποιός Γιώργος Βασιλείου
- Το Βήμα Πέθανε σε ηλικία 66 ετών ο ηθοποιός Γιώργος Βασιλείου
- Newsroom, CNN Greece Πέθανε ο Γιώργος Βασιλείου
