= Elena Nathanael =

Greek actress (1947–2008)

- Έλενα Ναθαναήλ
- Born: Eleni Delivassili-Nathanael; January 19, 1947; Nea Filadelfeia, Greece
- Died: March 4, 2008 (aged 61); Athens, Greece
- Occupation: Actress
- Years active: 1963–2007
- Partner: Tasos Mitropoulos
- Children: Inka
- Awards: Thessaloniki Film Festival - Best Actress; 1968 Randevou me mia agnosti - Christina

Elena Nathanael (Greek: Έλενα Ναθαναήλ, January 19, 1947 – March 4, 2008) was a Greek film actress.

== Biography ==
=== Early life ===
Elena Nathanael was born Eleni Delivassili-Nathanael, in Nea Filadelfeia, a town near Athens, to a well-off family. Delivassili was her father's surname and Nathanael was her mother's one, but she had kept both of them, although she was credited and became famous as Nathanael. Her father was a textile designer and manufacturer, an Asia Minor Greek from Aivali, while her mother was a Maniot. She studied drama at the Pelos Katselis Drama School.

=== Career ===
Her impressively good looks got her noticed in the 1960s by producers and directors of the then-flourishing Greek cinema. She first appeared at the cinema, in the movie Kati na kaiei in 1964, directed by Giannis Dalianidis. Her second screen role was in 1965, in the German movie The Blood of the Walsungs, directed by Rolf Thiele and based on a Thomas Mann novel. A few more parts followed in Greek movies of the late sixties and in most of her roles she was featured as a spoilt rich girl.

In 1968 she got the "Best Actress Award" in the International Thessaloniki Film Festival for her role in the movie Randevou me mia agnosti. In the early 1970s she established her screen persona as a free-spirited, beautiful young woman and became a fashion icon. The abrupt decline of the Greek commercial cinema during that decade had an unpleasant impact on her career which was something usual for the Greek film stars of the period.

After a seven-year absence she made a comeback with a number of straight-to-video movies, usually light comedies. After that she faded away and she made only some special appearances. One of her roles worthy of her beauty and acting abilities was that of "Julia" in the hugely successful soap opera, Aggigma psyhis, in 1998. Her last appearance was the role of "Maya Hoover" in the popular TV series aired on Mega Channel, Gorgones, in 2007, and her return was warmly received by the audience .

=== Personal life ===
Elena Nathanael had a relationship with Giorgos Tsagkaris, with whom gave birth to her daughter named Inka, in 1973. After her retirement, she had been living for several years at her farm in Euboea, with her life partner Tasos Mitropoulos, a veteran footballer of Olympiacos, where she had taken up wine production. She died from lung cancer on March 4, 2008, and the Greek press referred to her as the "Enchantress of the Greek cinema" (Γόησσα του ελληνικού κινηματογράφου). Her funeral took place on March 5, in the cemetery of Nea Filadelfeia, where a lot of people took leave of her.

== Filmography ==
Year	Title	Role	Notes
1964	Something Is Burning	Jenny	
1965	The Blood of the Walsungs	Sieglinde Arnstatt	
1966	Erotas stin kafti ammo	Katerina	
1966	The Fear	Anna	
1966	Queen of Clubs	Elena	
1967	O 13os	Maria	
1968	Apollo Goes on Holiday	Elena	
1968	Kataskopoi ston Saroniko	Toni	
1968	One Night for Love	Christina	
1969	To leventopaido	Katerina	
1969	Xypna Vasili	Dina Vasilaki	
1970	Proklisis	Eirini	
1971	Ethelontis ston erota	Mirka	
1971	Ekeino to kalokairi		
1971	Il sorriso del ragno		
1972	Anazitisis	Elena Hrysou	
1972	Antartes ton poleon	Anna Papadima	
1973	O aisiodoxos	Mary Saranti	
1973	Zitima zois kai thanatou	Olga	
1980	O podogyros	Journalist	
1981	Enas kontos tha mas sosei!	Flora	
1981	Eisai stin EOK, pathe gia tin EOK	Journalist	
1981	Tis politsmanas to... kangelo	Elena	
1982	Apithanoi, alloiotikoi ki oraioi...	Annita	
1982	Pagida stin Ellada		
1986	Oi Pontioi		
1987	Apousies		
1998	Black Out p.s. Red Out	Hristos' Mother	
2002	Sti skia tou Lemmy Caution	Antigoni	
