= Zahos Hadjifotiou =

Greek journalist (1923–2022)

Zacharias "Zahos" Hadjifotiou (Greek: Ζαχαρίας «Ζάχος» Χατζηφωτίου; 28 September 1923 – 30 September 2022) was a Greek industrialist, ship owner, journalist and writer.

== Biography ==
Zacharias Hadjifotiou was born on 28 September 1923, in the Plaka neighbourhood of Athens. His family hails from Psara. After the 1824 Destruction, they settled in Syros and later in Athens. In the Second World War, he took part in military operations and was decorated. He was married to Tzeni Karezi.

Between 1956 and 1962, Hadjifotiou worked as a director in a publishing house in Paris.

As a writer, he wrote for Greek newspapers, Kathimerini and Tachydromos.

Hadjifotiou was taken to NIMTS on early September 2022, and died on 30 September 2022, two days after his 99th birthday.

== Books ==
- The Middle East Affairs
