= Tzeni Karezi =

Greek actress (1932–1992)

Τζένη Καρέζη
- Born: Evgenia Karpouzi; 12 January 1932; Athens, Greece
- Died: 26 July 1992 (aged 60); Ilisia, Athens, Greece
- Other name: Jenny Karezi
- Occupation: Actress
- Years active: 1955–1990
- Spouse(s): Zahos Hadjifotiou (m. 1962 – d. 1965); Kostas Kazakos (1968–1992; her death); 1 child
- Children: Konstantinos Kazakos

Tzeni Karezi (Greek: Τζένη Καρέζη; 12 January 1932 – 26 July 1992) also known as Jenny Karezi, was a Greek film and stage actress. She was one of the most famous actresses in Greece.

== Biography ==
=== Early life ===
Evgenia Karpouzi was born in Athens, Greece, to a mathematician father from Mesolonghi and a high school teacher mother from Aigio. Her grandfather used to sell watermelons, called "karpouzia" in Greek (stemming from Turkish: karpuz), in his spare time, which is the source of her last name, Karpouzi (neuter singular). She studied at the French convent school Kalamari in Thessaloniki and then at the French St.Joseph convent school, in Athens.She learned French fluently. When she was a teenager, her father left the family and she continued to live with her mother. Her father died in a car accident in 1971.

In 1951, she was accepted at the Greek National Theatre Drama School(Εθνικό Θέατρο). The playwright Angelos Terzakis and the director Dimitris Rontiris were among her teachers. Upon graduating in 1954, she was immediately thrust into starring roles in the theatre and the cinema playing alongside such actors as Alexis Minotis and Katina Paxinou.

=== Career ===
Her stage debut was at the Marika Kotopouli theatre in the French comedy, La belle Heléne, with Melina Mercouri and Vasilis Diamantopoulos. In 1955, Karezi made her cinema debut in the Alekos Sakellarios’s comedy, Laterna, ftoheia kai filotimo in 1955, a massive success just like its sequel, Laterna, ftoheia kai garyfallo in 1957. For the soundtrack of the 1959 film To nisi ton genneon she recorded a song by the future Academy Award-winner Manos Hadjidakis, "Min ton rotas ton ourano" ("Do not ask the sky").

Her career flourished in the 1960s, when she headed her own theatre troupe in 1961 and starred in some of the most classic movies of the Greek cinema like, Lola (1964), Mia trelli ... trelli oikogeneia (1965), Tzeni-Tzeni (1966), and Kontserto gia polyvola (1967). Her greatest film success was, Ta kokkina fanaria (The Red Lanterns; 1963), which was nominated for the Academy Award for Best Foreign Language Film.

Her last film appearance was in Aristophanes's Lysistrata (1972). Over the following decade, she continued to produce and star in such stage classics as Who's Afraid of Virginia Woolf?, Medea and Electra. She appeared for the last time in theatre in 1990 in Loula Anagnostaki's play, Diamonds and the blues; suffering from terminal cervical cancer, she was in great pain and had to leave the theatre.

=== Personal life ===
In May 1962, Karezi wed a journalist, Zahos Hadjifotiou, but this marriage ended in divorce two years later. In 1967, during the filming of Kontserto gia polyvola, she met Kostas Kazakos, with whom she had her only child, Konstantinos Kazakos, who became also an actor. They formed a popular duo and her repertoire shifted to more sophisticated and intellectual plays. They were led to prison where they spent several nights due to the play To megalo mas tsirko (Our Big Circus) in 1973, which insulted the Greek junta.

== Death ==
Tzeni Karezi died of cancer, at her home, in the Ilisia neighbourhood of Athens, on 26 July 1992 and was buried at public expense. She was believed to be 60 years old (varying different years of birth had been ascribed over the years). Thousands attended her funeral.

A metastatic cancer victim, she asked those close to her to make palliative care better known and to assist in its development so others suffering painful diseases or ailments would be able to live their last days with dignity. The Jenny Karezi Foundation is a non-profit Cancer Pain Relief and Palliative Care organization, founded in 1992, in memory of the Greek actress. The Foundation's mission is to relieve patients with cancer and other chronic diseases, through medical and psychological support.

== Filmography ==
Year	Title	Role	Notes
1955	Laterna, ftoheia kai filotimo	Kaiti	box office: 126,530
1957	Dellistavrou kai ios	Billy Mavrogianni	box office: 106,356
1957	I theia ap'to Chicago	Katina Barda	box office: 142,459
1957	Laterna, ftoheia kai garyfallo	Kaiti	box office: 113,641
1958	To trellokoritso	Jenny	
1958	Mia laterna, mia zoi	Miranda/Nina	
1958	I limni ton pothon	Miranda	
1959	To nisi ton genneon	Dona	
1959	Taxidi me ton erota	Gianna	
1959	Navagia tis zois	Foula	
1960	To koroidaki tis despoinidos	Julia	box office: 115,029
1960	Randevou stin Kerkyra	Diana Laniti/Mirka	box office: 95,664
1960	Hristina	Hristina	
1960	I hionati kai ta 7 gerontopalikara	Alexia/Marina	box office: 88,074
1961	Poia einai i Margarita	Margarita Kondostavrou	
1962	Prodomeni agapi	Anna	
1962	I nyfi to skase		
1963	Ta kokkina fanaria	Eleni	box office: 473,686; Academy Award nomination - Best Foreign Language Film; Cannes Film Festival nomination - Grand Prix du Festival International du Film
1964	Despoinis diefthyntis	Lila Vasileiou	box office: 402,143
1964	Lola	Lola	
1964	Enas megalos erotas	Lena	box office: 202,607
1965	Mia trelli...trelli oikogeneia	Mika	box office: 521,134
1966	Tzeni Tzeni	Tzeni Skoutari	box office: 587,323
1966	Une balle au coeur	Carla	
1967	Ekeinos ki ekeini	She	box office: 198,551
1967	Kontserto gia polyvola	Niki	
1968	Enas ippotis gia ti Vasoula	Vasoula Liontou	box office: 347,441
1968	Agapi kai aima	Fani Geraka	
1970	Mia gynaika stin Antistasi	Anna Kolleti	
1971	Manto Mavrogenous	Manto Mavrogenous	
1972	Erotiki symfonia	Eirini/Betty Stergiou	producer and writer
1972	Lysistrati	Lysistrati	International Thessaloniki Film Festival win - Best Production
