= The Young Will Live =

1965 film

- Directed by: Nikos Tzimas
- Written by: Nikos Tzimas
- Starring: Faidon Georgitsis
- Cinematography: Giorgos Kavagias
- Production company: Star Film
- Release date: 1965
- Running time: 85 minutes
- Country: Greece
- Language: Greek

The Young Will Live (Greek: Oi neoi theloun na zisoun) is a 1965 Greek drama film directed by Nikos Tzimas. It was entered into the 4th Moscow International Film Festival.

== Cast ==
- Phaedon Georgitsis as Giorgos
- Alexandra Ladikou as Efi
- Sylvia Hatzigeorgiou
- Notis Peryalis
- Foivos Taxiarhis
