= Ulla Bergryd =

Swedish actress and lecturer

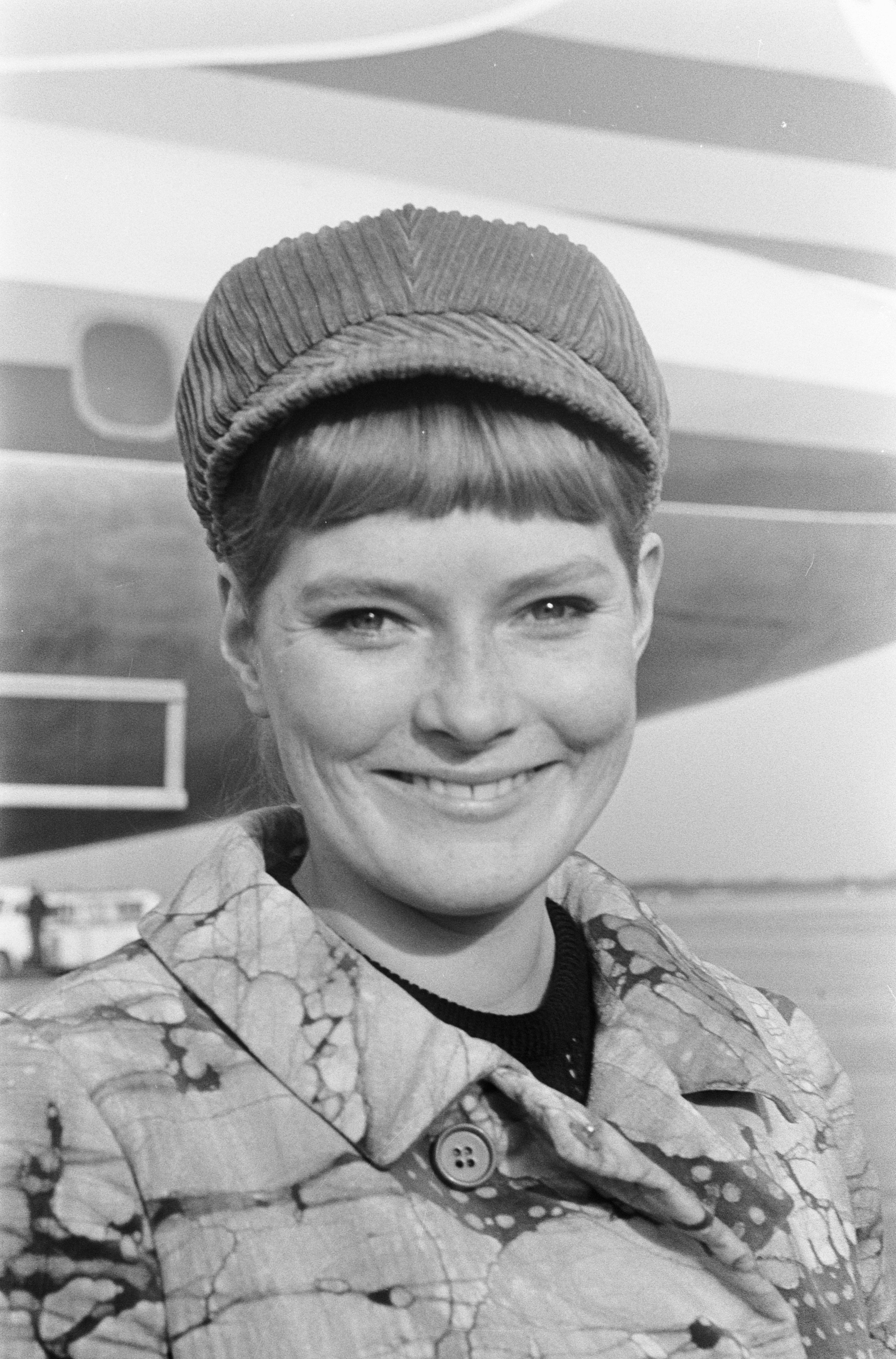
- Bergryd in 1966
- Born: 25 July 1942; Stockholm, Sweden
- Died: 31 May 2015 (aged 72); Stockholm, Sweden
- Resting place: Skogskyrkogården
- Occupations: Actress, lecturer

Ulla Bergryd (25 July 1942 – 31 May 2015) was a Swedish actress and lecturer.

== Career ==
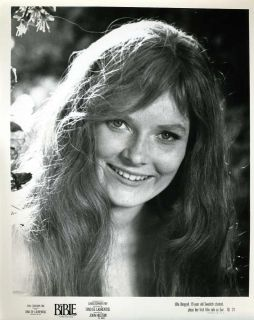
Bergryd in a promotional picture for The Bible: In the Beginning... (1966)

Bergryd was 23 years old and a modeling and anthropology student living in Gothenburg, Sweden when she was discovered by a talent scout, who photographed her in a museum there, and then promptly hired to perform as Eve in the epic film The Bible: In the Beginning... by John Huston in 1965. In an interview for The Pittsburgh Press, Bergryd recalled the experience:

I was especially surprised by the fact that I started to work four days after signing a contract. Although I've always been interested in movies and the theater, I'd never seen any actual shooting, and it was all very exciting.

Her role in the film was noted by some reviews of the film. One writer for the Spanish magazine Semana wrote, "I think that, really, if the first woman in the world has to look like another of today, this other woman is none other than Ulla Bergryd, for her youth, her sweetness, her serene beauty and that enigmatic and fascinating je ne sais quoi."

In 1967 she took on the small role of a tourist alongside Thomas Fritsch in the Greek-Swedish film comedy Epiheirisis Apollon ("Apollo Goes on Holiday"). It was her last appearance on camera.

She retired from acting afterwards and became a lecturer at the School of Sociology of the Stockholm University. She co-wrote books on the field with Gunnar Boalt.

Bergryd died on 31 May 2015 at the age of 72. Her cause of death was never explicitly revealed.

== Filmography ==
- The Bible: In the Beginning... (1966) as Eve
- Apollo Goes on Holiday (1968) as Tourist
