= The Red Lanterns =

- Directed by: Vasilis Georgiadis
- Written by: Alekos Galanos
- Produced by: Theophanis Damaskinos; Victor Michaelides
- Starring: Tzeni Karezi; George Foundas; Mary Chronopoulou; Dimitris Papamichael; Manos Katrakis; Alexandra Lydikou; Despo Diamantidou; Katerina Helmi; Phaedon Georgitsis; Notis Pergialis; Eleni Anousaki
- Cinematography: Nikos Gardelis
- Music by: Stavros Xarchakos
- Production company: Damaskinos-Mihailidis
- Release date: 2 December 1963
- Running time: 132 minutes
- Country: Greece
- Language: Greek

The Red Lanterns (Greek: Τα κόκκινα φανάρια, translit. Ta Kokkina fanaria) is a 1963 Greek drama film directed by Vasilis Georgiadis and based on a play by Alekos Galanos. It was nominated for the Academy Award for Best Foreign Language Film. It was also entered into the 1964 Cannes Film Festival.

== Plot ==
The film begins with a happy couple, Eleni and Petros, at an amusement park in Athens, celebrating their affair. Some time later, Eleni and Petros are together again on a beautiful day, but she has to go, so she leaves for her secret workplace: The Red Lanterns.

There, Eleni and many other girls work as prostitutes. Each of them has her own story: Eleni, the protagonist, originates from Romania and travelled to Greece looking for a better life; however, because of choices she has made, she is now the most famous of the prostitutes. Anna is a young woman in love with Captain Nicholas. She has a child, but is afraid to tell the Captain about him. Mary (Mairi Chronopoulou) is the eldest of them and the most "masculine" in manners. A young customer named Angelos falls in love with her, and soon they begin a passionate love affair. Marina, a girl from a village far away from Athens, is madly in love with Doris, her "manager." All of them work in the home of Madam Pari (Despo Diamantidou), a professional madam and former prostitute herself. Katerina is a kindhearted, poor, abused, and ignored cleaning woman and servant there. She is married to an old man who is institutionalized. Michalis is Eleni's "manager" and also in love with her; however, she hates him.

Soon, another woman joins their "home." Myrsine is a 16-year-old girl who becomes one of them after being pursued by a cop. Michalis tries to seduce her but doesn't succeed. After Captain Nicholas leaves, Anna tells Helen that she has a child and that no one knows. Anna then tells her son Alex that the Captain is his father and that she waits for Captain Nicholas' return. On Christmas Eve, Angelos proposes to Mary, but she laughingly rejects him. Doris leaves Marina, who is crying and screaming, threatening to kill herself.

Eleni arrives at the Christmas party after having had a romantic dinner with Petros. Petros follows her, and when he discovers her secret, he beats her. Crying, she tries to explain everything, but he leaves crying, too. After everything that's happened, The Red Lanterns close down. Anna awaits a letter from Captain Nicholas, but she discovers that the entire Eternal Ship crew, including Captain Nicholas, died in a storm. Mary, Marina, and Myrsine try to find a place of their own so they can continue working. Michalis once again tries to seduce Eleni, but she and Petros reunite and are happier than ever. The movie ends with Katerina leaving the Red Lanterns with her husband, poor but happy. He asks her, "Isn't life beautiful?" to which she responds, "It's fine."

== Cast ==
- Tzeni Karezi - Eleni Nicoleskou
- Giorgos Foundas - Michailos
- Dimitris Papamichael - Petros
- Alexandra Ladikou - Anna Georganta
- Manos Katrakis - Captain Nicholas
- Mary Chronopoulou - Mary Pana
- Phaedon Georgitsis - Angelos
- Despo Diamantidou - Madam Pari
- Eleni Anousaki - Myrsine
- Katerina Helmy - Marina Georgiadou
- Kostas Kourtis - Doris
- Yro Kyriakaki - Katerina
- Notis Peryalis - old man

== See also ==
- List of submissions to the 36th Academy Awards for Best Foreign Language Film
- List of Greek submissions for the Academy Award for Best Foreign Language Film
