= Blood on the Land =

1966 film

- Directed by: Vasilis Georgiadis
- Written by: Nikos Foskolos
- Starring: Nikos Kourkoulos
- Cinematography: Nikos Dimopoulos
- Release date: 1966
- Running time: 130 minutes
- Country: Greece
- Language: Greek

Blood on the Land (Greek: Το χώμα βάφτηκε κόκκινο, romanized: To homa vaftike kokkino, lit. 'The soil was painted red') is a 1966 Greek western drama film directed by Vasilis Georgiadis, with a screenplay by Nikos Foskolos. Starring Nikos Kourkoulos, Manos Katrakis, and Mary Chronopoulou, the film depicts the struggle of unfree peasants in Thessaly for land ownership against large landowners in 1907.

Nominated for Best Foreign Language Film at the 38th Academy Awards, it was successful commercially and received awards, including Best Music at the Karlovy Vary International Film Festival.

== Plot ==
The story begins with Odysseas encountering police officers on a train as he returns home, only to be expelled due to his prior incarceration. During his journey back, he encounters a group of homeless individuals, known as Koligoi, seeking passage across a river that demarcates the boundary of his father's property. Hindered by obstacles created by his brother's men and a destroyed bridge, the homeless are prevented from crossing until Odysseas intervenes, facilitating their passage. At a church service atop the Meteora rocks, reminiscent of the biblical tale of the prodigal son, Odysseas reunites with his father amidst celebrations on the estate.

Nevertheless, tensions arise when Rigas, Odysseas' younger brother and manager of the estate, opposes the festivities for the former prisoner. Rigas manipulates the Koligoi into forced labour agreements, drawing objections from the teacher Marinos Antipas. Confrontations escalate, resulting in violence and the establishment of a makeshift refugee camp.

As the narrative unfolds, various secondary storylines emerge, including the evasion of Rigas' men by a Koligo woman and Irini's resistance against Rigas' advances. Amidst these conflicts, Odysseas becomes embroiled in a complex web of betrayal and vengeance, culminating in a dramatic confrontation on the Meteora rocks.

The resolution of the film portrays Odysseas advocating for justice and unity, symbolized by his decision to allocate his land to the homeless, echoing the sentiment expressed by Eleftherios Venizelos that "Slaves could not free slaves."

== Cast ==
- Nikos Kourkoulos as Odysseas Hormovas
- Mary Chronopoulou as Eirini
- Giannis Voglis as Rigas Hormovas
- Faidon Georgitsis as Giannos
- Zeta Apostolou
- Notis Peryalis as Marinos Antypas
- Eleni Kriti
- Angelos Antonopoulos as Kotsos
- Manos Katrakis as Father Hormovas
- Athinodoros Prousalis as a police officer

== See also ==
- List of submissions to the 38th Academy Awards for Best Foreign Language Film
- List of Greek submissions for the Academy Award for Best Foreign Language Film
