= The Bible: In the Beginning... =

1966 film directed by John Huston

The Bible...In the Beginning
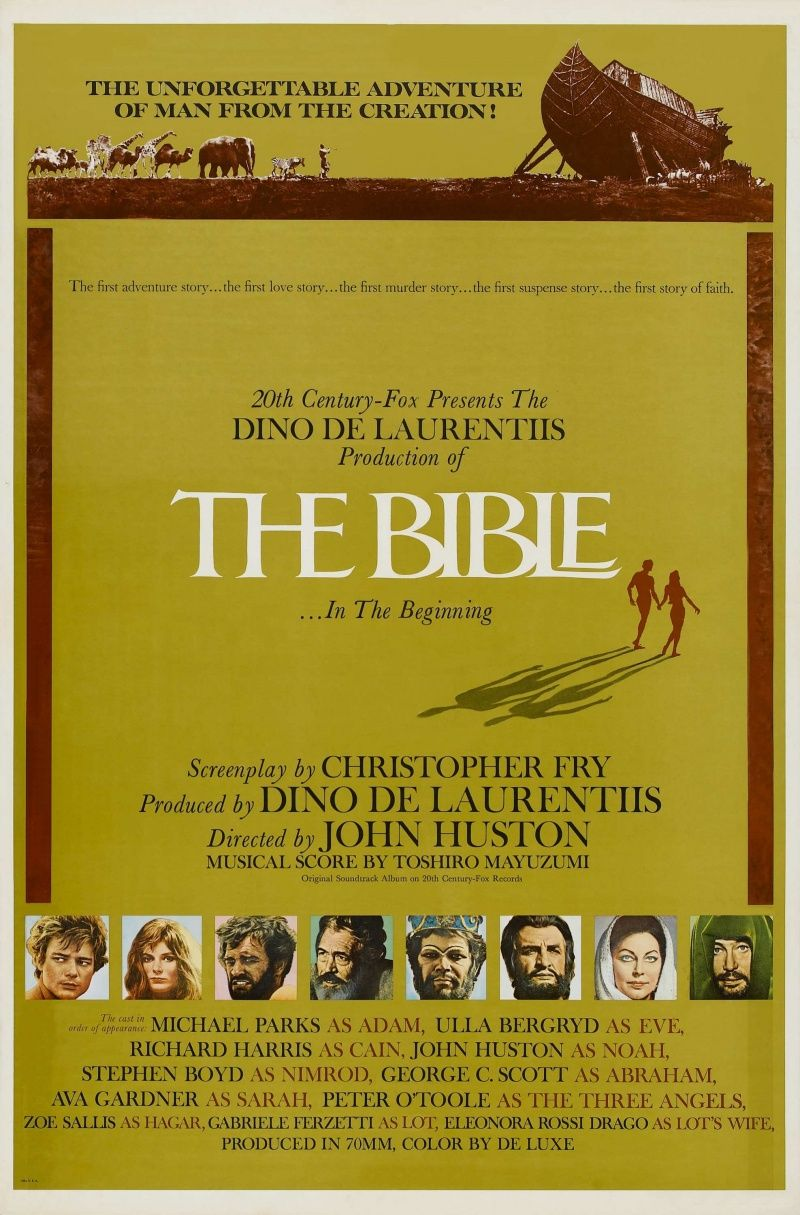
- U.S. film poster
- Directed by: John Huston
- Screenplay by: Christopher Fry (Note: Includes additional material by Orson Welles, Ivo Perilli, Jonathan Griffin, Mario Soldati and Vittorio Bonicelli. Welles and Soldati are uncredited.)
- Based on: Book of Genesis
- Produced by: Dino De Laurentiis
- Starring: Michael Parks; Ulla Bergryd; Richard Harris; John Huston; Stephen Boyd; George C. Scott; Ava Gardner; Peter O'Toole; Zoe Sallis; Gabriele Ferzetti; Eleonora Rossi Drago
- Narrated by: John Huston
- Cinematography: Giuseppe Rotunno
- Edited by: Ralph Kemplen
- Music by: Toshiro Mayuzumi
- Production companies: Dino de Laurentiis Cinematografica; Seven Arts Productions
- Distributed by: 20th Century Fox
- Release dates: 28 September 1966 (New York City premiere); 13 October 1966 (Italy)
- Running time: 174 minutes
- Countries: Italy; United States
- Language: English
- Budget: $15–$18 million
- Box office: $34.9 million

The Bible...In the Beginning (Italian: La Bibbia, lit. 'The Bible') is a 1966 religious epic film produced by Dino De Laurentiis and directed by John Huston. It recounts the first 22 chapters of the Biblical Book of Genesis, covering the stories from The Creation and Garden of Eden to the binding of Isaac.

Released by 20th Century Fox, the film's ensemble cast features Huston, Michael Parks, Richard Harris, Franco Nero, Stephen Boyd, George C. Scott, Ava Gardner, Peter O'Toole and Gabriele Ferzetti. The screenplay was written by Christopher Fry, with additional material by Orson Welles, Ivo Perilli, Jonathan Griffin, Mario Soldati and Vittorio Bonicelli. The film was photographed by Giuseppe Rotunno in Dimension 150, a variant of the 70mm Todd-AO format. The musical score was by the Japanese composer Toshiro Mayuzumi.

Premiering in New York City on 28 September 1966, the film received mixed reviews from critics. The National Board of Review of Motion Pictures included the film in its Top Ten Films list of 1966. De Laurentiis and Huston won David di Donatello Awards for Best Producer and Best Foreign Director, respectively. Toshiro Mayuzumi's score was nominated for an Academy Award and a Golden Globe. The film was originally conceived as the first in a series of films retelling the entire Old Testament, but these sequels were never made.

== Plot ==
=== Part I ===
The film begins with the Creation. God creates the heavens and earth, including the first man, Adam and the first woman, Eve. Both live in the utopical Garden of Eden until a Serpent convinces Eve to disobey God by eating a fruit from the tree of knowledge, and in turn Eve convinces Adam to do the same. God punishes the Serpent and banishes Adam and Eve from the Garden.

Eve gives birth to two children: Cain and Abel. When they are older, Cain becomes a farmer and Abel a shepherd, and they both make regular ritual sacrifices to God. When Cain offers his share of harvest and Abel offers a lamb, God favors the lamb sacrifice. Cain, filled with jealousy, murders Abel and runs away. Adam and Eve mourn the loss of both their sons, but God gives them another, who they name Seth. Generations come to pass, and most of the descendants of Cain grow evil.

God is displeased by his creation and intends to destroy it all via a global flood. He makes contact with Adam's descendant Noah, and commands him to build an Ark in order to save himself and his family. Noah obeys and, after the ark is finished, two pairs of clean and unclean animals and birds are brought to the ark. After the door is shut, a storm occurs and the fountains of water erupt, flooding the earth. All living things outside the ark die while the occupants survive. Forty days later, with Noah's wife counting the days, the ark lands in the mountains of Ararat, where the animals and birds disembark. God then promises Noah to never again destroy his creation by flood. This is symbolized by a rainbow.

=== Part II ===
The second part begins with a visual representation of Noah's descendants and a brief depiction of the story of the Tower of Babel, in which the king Nimrod defies God by ordering the construction of a colossal tower and firing an arrow from the top of it towards the sky. God responds by confusing the people to speak different languages, making them disperse across the Earth.

The remainder of the film tells the story of Abraham. God chooses him to become a father of a great nation by migrating his family to the land of Canaan. Abraham wants a child who would inherit his position, but his wife Sarah is barren. Sarah offers her handmaiden Hagar to bear Abraham's children instead. Hagar becomes pregnant with Ishmael, but God promises that Abraham will have another child with Sarah, and his child will be called Isaac and will inherit Abraham's position instead of Ishmael. Hagar and Sarah begin to grow resentful of each other.

The men of Abraham start quarreling with those of his nephew Lot, and so they agree to part ways. Lot decides to try and live with his family in the city of Sodom and Gomorrah. Abraham receives the visit of three angels, who announces Sarah's pregnancy and God's plan to destroy Sodom and Gomorrah by fire. Abraham intercedes for the sodomites. Two of the angels go visit Lot, telling him and his family to flee the city and never look back. Then the angels bring down fire, destroying the city, and Lot's wife looks back and she is turned into a pillar of salt.

Sarah finally gives birth to Isaac, and Abraham gives a feast for Isaac. Sarah, fearing that Ishmael might kill Isaac as Cain did to Abel, asks Abraham to send him away. Abraham exiles him along with his mother out into the desert. With Ishmael on the verge of death, Hagar cries out to God for help. Then God miraculously creates a spring from the sand, promising that Ishmael will be a father of a great nation and that he and his descendants may prosper.

God then instructs Abraham to kill Isaac as a sacrifice. Abraham is devastated, but obeys and takes off towards the mountain Moriah, alone with Isaac, in order to make the sacrifice there without telling his true intentions to him or his mother. In a scene unique to this adaptation, Abraham and Isaac make a stop at the devastated ruins of Sodom and Gomorrah, where they ponder the wrath of God. In Moriah, as Abraham prepares to sacrifice his son, God stops him, revealing it was all a test to see if Abraham would still obey God no matter what. Instead, Abraham and Isaac sacrifice a ram that was stuck in some nearby bushes.

== Cast ==
- John Huston as the narrator, Noah and the voice of God
- Michael Parks as Adam
- Ulla Bergryd as Eve
- Flavio Bennati as Serpent
- Richard Harris as Cain
- Franco Nero as Abel
- Stephen Boyd as Nimrod
- George C. Scott as Abraham
- Ava Gardner as Sarah
- Peter O'Toole as The Three Angels
- Zoe Sallis as Hagar
- Gabriele Ferzetti as Lot
- Eleonora Rossi Drago as Lot's Wife
- Pupella Maggio as Noah's Wife
- Robert Rietti as Abraham's Steward
- Peter Heinze as Shem
- Maria Grazia Spina as Lot's Daughter
- Angelo Boscariol as Ham
- Claudie Lange as Nimrod's Wife
- Anna Orso as Shem's Wife
- Adriana Ambesi as Lot's Daughter
- Eric Leutzinger as Japheth
- Gabriella Pallotta as Ham's Wife
- Alberto Lucantoni as Isaac
- Rossana Di Rocco as Japheth's Wife
- Luciano Conversi as Ishmael
- Giovanna Galletti as Sinful Woman
- Lars Bloch as Archangel Michael
- Ivan Rassimov as Babylonian Dignitary

== Production ==
=== Development ===
In May 1961, Italian film producer Dino De Laurentiis announced his plans to make a film about the Bible, which would include stories from both the Old and New Testaments. He envisioned it as a 10-hour film divided into three parts, and estimated he would need three years and $24 million to produce it. In June, De Laurentiis hired British playwright Christopher Fry to write the final screenplay of the film. Fry said he was "very enthusiastic about this assignment." De Laurentiis' initial three-film idea included depictions of the Creation, the story of Jesus, and the foundation of the Christian Church. Fry was chosen to "put the finishing touches" to a script composed of various episodes, each to be written by a different writer. Each sequence in the film would be filmed by a different director, and the cast would include 50 stars and hundreds of "top-flight" character actors.

In June 1962, De Laurentiis offered the role of Judas Iscariot to Montgomery Clift, who said he would play the part if it was not a cameo. In July, Anita Ekberg and Jo Morrow were considered for a role in the film, which Ekberg turned down. That same month, De Laurentiis said he would not hire actors "who think they are bigger than the parts they play." In September, Fry was writing the script of Part One of The Bible, which would begin with the Book of Genesis and end with the Fall of Jericho. By December, De Laurentiis had hired Luchino Visconti and Federico Fellini to direct some of the film's sequences.

In January 1963, De Laurentiis hired a third director, Orson Welles, to direct the "Esau and Jacob" sequence. Fellini and Visconti were going to direct "The Deluge and Noah's Ark" and "Joseph and his Brethren" episodes, respectively. In March, Fry and other writers were still working on the screenplay, while De Laurentiis was considering the possibilities of releasing The Bible as one, two, or three films. In June, Fellini left the project because the "only idea [he] could think of was a movie about a director trying to do a movie about the Bible." In July, De Laurentiis chose Welles for the job of directing the "Abraham" and "Jacob" segments, which were scheduled to be filmed in Spain and Sicily. Columbia Pictures allocated $20 million for the film. By August, De Laurentiis had hired Robert Bresson to direct the first half of The Bible, from Creation to Cain and Abel. Welles went to the top of Mount Etna in Sicily to look at the landscapes where he would film the ruins of Sodom and Gomorrah. In September, De Laurentiis convinced John Huston to direct the entire 12-hour film. Welles backed out of the film due to a "disagreement with the producer." In November, Columbia Pictures decided not to finance the film.

Seven Arts Productions contributed 30% of the budget.

=== Casting ===
In March 1963, Ina Balin was cast in the film. By May, Spencer Tracy and Katharine Hepburn had agreed to play Abraham and Sarah, but Tracy later became ill and could not play the role. In July, when the screenplay included Jacob's story, Peter O'Toole was given the role of Jacob. In August, O'Toole was recast as Nimrod, the king of Babel, and became the first actor to be signed for a leading role in the film. That same month, De Laurentiis traveled to London to try to sign Richard Burton for either Noah or Jacob and also Trevor Howard for Abraham. Howard was signed for Abraham on September 3.

In January 1964, De Laurentiis said he was considering asking Maria Callas to play the role of Sarah.

Ava Gardner was reluctant at first to play the part of Sarah, but after John Huston talked her into it, she accepted. She later explained why she accepted the role:

He (Huston) had more faith in me than I did myself. Now I'm glad I listened, for it is a challenging role and a very demanding one. I start out as a young wife and age through various periods, forcing me to adjust psychologically to each age. It is a complete departure for me and most intriguing. In this role, I must create a character, not just play one.

Anglo-Persian actress Zoe Sallis, who was cast as Hagar, was originally known as Zoe Ishmail, until Huston decided that she change her name because of its similarity to the name of Ishmael, her character's son, played by Luciano Conversi.

Ulla Bergryd was an anthropology student living in Gothenburg, Sweden when she was discovered by a talent scout, who photographed her in a museum there, and then promptly hired to play Eve. In an interview for The Pittsburgh Press, Bergryd recalled the experience:

I was especially surprised by the fact that I started to work four days after signing a contract. Although I've always been interested in movies and the theater, I'd never seen any actual shooting, and it was all very exciting.

Huston originally considered Alec Guinness (who was unavailable) and Charlie Chaplin (who declined) for the part of Noah until he finally decided to play it himself.

The film marks the debut of Italian actress Anna Orso, who portrays the role of Shem's wife. It also introduced Franco Nero to American audiences; Nero, who was working as the film's still photographer, was hired by Huston for the role of Abel due to his handsome features. At the time, Nero could not speak English, and Huston gave him recordings of William Shakespeare with which to study.

Moelwyn Merchant (credited as "W. M. Merchant") was a theological and historical consultant for the film.

=== Filming ===
Filming took place mainly in locations throughout Italy, including Rome, Sardinia, Sicily, Itri, Abruzzo and Mount Vesuvius.

The scenes involving the Garden of Eden were shot at a "small zoological garden" in Rome instead of a "beautiful place of trees, glades and wildflowers" which had been demolished shortly before the shooting began. Ulla Bergryd, who was cast as Eve, later recalled, "Paradise was, in fact, an old botanical garden on the outskirts of Rome."

There were five reproductions of Noah's Ark built for the film. The largest reproduction, which stood on the backlot of the De Laurentiis Film Center, was 200 feet long, 64 feet wide, and 50 feet high; it was used for the long shot of Noah loading the animals. The interior reproduction, which was one of the "largest interior sets ever designed and constructed", was 150 feet long and 58 feet high and had "three decks, divided into a hundred pens" and a ramp that ran "clear around the ark from top to bottom". The third reproduction was a "skeleton" ark, built for the scenes depicting Noah and his sons constructing the Ark. The fourth reproduction was "placed at the foot of a dam" for the inundation sequences and the fifth reproduction was a miniature for the storm sequences. The cost of building the five reproductions was more than $1 million. The building took months and more than 500 workers were employed. The animals were delivered from a zoo in Germany. The whole segment of Noah's Ark had a total budget of $3 million.

The opening Creation sequence was shot by photographer Ernst Haas, featuring choreography by Katherine Dunham.

Carlo Rambaldi was an uncredited special effects artist on the film.

== Music ==
RCA, the company I was working for at the time, around 1964–1965, asked me to score THE BIBLE ... I was just asked to prepare a piece inspired by the Creation as narrated in the Torah and the Bible ... I recorded both pieces under the direction of Franco Ferrara in RCA's magnificent Studio A. ... The realization convinced everybody: the company, the editor, and above all John Huston, who congratulated me vividly. Everything was going beyond any positive expectation, when at a certain point Dino De Laurentiis asked me to make the film directly with him, totally cutting RCA out of the deal. His offer was generous but incorrect. I dryly refused, though I was aware of the consequences. I was bound to RCA by an exclusive licensing, and apart from my contract, the label had already invested a lot of money in that production. I revealed what had happened to the company and tried to reach an agreement, which would have allowed me to keep the film. The record company refused, pointing out that exclusive licensing did not leave any room for negotiations. The chance blew by and the film's score was entrusted to the Japanese composer Mayuzumi, who did an excellent job, by the way.

— Ennio Morricone on his unused score.

The Oscar and Golden Globe-nominated score was written by Japanese composer Toshiro Mayuzumi. It was the first of only two times the acclaimed composer scored an American film (the other being John Huston's Reflections in a Golden Eye).

Huston initially wanted to score the film with existing music by Igor Stravinsky, but was unable to secure a licensing deal. Stravinsky likewise declined an offer to write an original score. Dino De Laurentiis put forward Goffredo Petrassi as composer, but Huston rejected him.

De Laurentiis then hired Ennio Morricone, who wrote and recorded about 15 minutes of test cues which Huston approved of. However, due to a contract dispute between De Laurentiis and Morricone's then-publisher RCA Records, Morricone was let go. Huston then hired Mayuzumi, whom he called a "modern Beethoven". Morricone's cues were reworked into three of his later scores: The Return of Ringo (1965), Garden of Delights (1967), and The Secret of the Sahara (1988).

Mayuzumi's Academy Award nod made him the first Japanese-born composer to be nominated for a Best Original Score Oscar. As of 2025, the only other composer to do so is Ryuichi Sakamoto for The Last Emperor (see: List of Japanese Academy Award winners and nominees).

== Release ==
The Bible: In the Beginning ... premiered at New York City's Loew's State Theatre on 28 September 1966. The day after the premiere, Ava Gardner remarked, "It's the only time in my life I actually enjoyed working—making that picture."

== Reception ==
=== Critical reception ===
Philip K. Scheuer of the Los Angeles Times wrote, "Director John Huston and his associates have wrought a motion picture that is not only magnificent almost beyond cinematic belief but that is also powerful, quaint, funny, thought-provoking and of course, this being the Old Testament, filled with portents of doom." Variety noted that "the world's oldest story—the origins of Mankind, as told in the Book of Genesis—is put upon the screen by director John Huston and producer Dino De Laurentiis with consummate skill, taste and reverence." It also commended the "lavish, but always tasteful production [that] assaults and rewards the eye and ear with awe-inspiring realism."

Other reviews were less positive. Bosley Crowther of The New York Times wrote that the film had "extraordinary special effects" but was lacking "a galvanizing feeling of connection in the stories from Genesis", and "simply repeats in moving pictures what has been done with still pictures over the centuries. That is hardly enough to adorn this medium and engross sophisticated audience." Richard L. Coe of The Washington Post described the film as "cautiously literary, impressive in some instances, absurd in others". The Monthly Film Bulletin opined that "the seven or eight episodes are diffusely long, tediously slow, depressingly reverent. The liveliest of the lot is The Ark, with Huston himself as a jolly, Dr. Dolittle old Noah, and a lot of irrestistibly solemn and silly animals; but even here sheer length eventually wears down one's attention." Episcopal priest and author Malcolm Boyd wrote, "Its interpretation of Holy Scripture is fundamentalistic, honoring letter while ignoring (or violating) spirit. John Huston got bogged down in material of the Sunday School picture-book level and seems unable to have gotten out of the rut. It is an over-long (174 minutes plus intermission) picture, tedious and boring." In Leonard Maltin's annual home video guide the film is given a BOMB rating, its review stating, "Only Huston himself as Noah escapes heavy-handedness. Definitely one time you should read the Book instead."

=== Box office ===
The film grossed $34.9 million in North America, making it the highest-grossing film of 1966. It earned $15 million in domestic rentals during its initial theatrical release.

The film was the second most popular Italian production in Italy in 1966 with 11,245,980 admissions, just behind The Good, the Bad and the Ugly, and is the 15th most popular of all-time.

According to Fox records, the film needed to earn $26,900,000 in rentals to break even and made $25,325,000 worldwide (as of 11 December 1970), making a loss of $1.5 million.

== Awards and nominations ==
| Award | Category | Nominee | Result |
|---|---|---|---|
| Academy Award | Best Original Score | Toshiro Mayuzumi | Nominated |
| David di Donatello | Best Producer | Dino De Laurentiis | Won |
| David di Donatello | Best Cinematography | Giuseppe Rotunno | Won |
| David di Donatello | Production Design | Mario Chiari | Won |
| David di Donatello | Best Foreign Director | John Huston | Won |
| Golden Globe Awards | Best Original Score - Motion Picture | Toshiro Mayuzumi | Nominated |
| National Board of Review of Motion Pictures | Top Ten Films of 1966 | | Won |
| Italian National Syndicate of Film Journalists Silver Ribbon Awards | Best Cinematography, Color | Giuseppe Rotunno | Nominated |
| Italian National Syndicate of Film Journalists Silver Ribbon Awards | Best Costume Design | Maria De Matteis | Nominated |
| Italian National Syndicate of Film Journalists Silver Ribbon Awards | Best Producer | Dino De Laurentiis | Nominated |
| Italian National Syndicate of Film Journalists Silver Ribbon Awards | Best Production Design | Mario Chiari | Won |

== Home media ==
20th Century Fox released the film on videocassettes during the later 1970s, 1980s and 1990s, DVD in 2002, Blu-ray Disc on 22 March 2011 and online for both permanent downloading and streaming video online rentals.

== See also ==
- List of American films of 1966
- List of films based on the Bible

== See also ==
- John Huston filmography

== Bibliography ==
- Huston, John (1994). An Open Book. Da Capo Press. ISBN 9780306805738.
- Meyers, Jeffrey (2011). John Huston: Courage and Art. Random House. ISBN 9780307590671.
- Hughes, Howard (2011). Cinema Italiano - The Complete Guide From Classics To Cult. London - New York: I.B.Tauris. ISBN 978-1-84885-608-0.
