= Queen of Clubs (film) =

1966 Greek drama film

- Directed by: George Skalenakis
- Written by: Giannis Tziotis
- Produced by: Theophanis A. Damaskinos
- Starring: Elena Nathanail
- Music by: Yannis Markopoulos
- Release date: September 1966
- Running time: 87 minutes
- Country: Greece
- Language: Greek

Queen of Clubs (Greek: Ντάμα σπαθί, translit. Dama spathi) is a 1966 Greek drama film directed by George Skalenakis. The film was selected as the Greek entry for the Best Foreign Language Film at the 39th Academy Awards, but was not accepted as a nominee.

== Cast ==
- Elena Nathanail as Elena
- Spiros Focás as Alexandros
- Thodoros Roubanis as Vasilis (as Theo Roubanis)
- Despo Diamantidou as Marianthi
- Dimos Starenios as Teacher
- Aris Malliagros as Doctor

== See also ==
- List of submissions to the 39th Academy Awards for Best Foreign Language Film
- List of Greek submissions for the Academy Award for Best Foreign Language Film
