= Se Fonto Kokkino =

Television series

- Also known as: In Red Background
- Σε Φόντο Κόκκινο
- Genre: soap opera
- Created by: Demetres Tokaris
- Written by: Demetres Tokaris (Head writer), Maria Avraamidou, Elena Christoforou, Maria Charalambous and Maria Ioannou
- Directed by: Nick G Kokkinos, Loizos Markides, Kiros Rossides, Giorgos Siougas
- Opening theme: "Se Fonto Kokkino" performed by Yiannis Kotsiras
- Country of origin: Cyprus
- Original language: Greek

Production
- Producers: Michalis Terzis, Marios Pampi, Voula Karaoli, Despina Kolokotroni
- Production locations: Cyprus, United Kingdom, Lebanon, Greece, Egypt
- Running time: 35 minutes (2008-2012)

Original release
- Network: Sigma TV
- Release: September 2008 – July 2012

Se Fonto Kokkino is the second longest running daily Cypriot soap opera. The show consists of 735 episodes in four seasons and it was produced and broadcast by Sigma TV, created by Demetres Tokaris and directed by Nick G Kokkinos, Loizos Markides, Kiros Rossidis and Giorgos Siougas.

== Main cast ==
Main cast includes:

Giannis Voglis

Stavros Louras (episodes: 1 - 735)

Andreas Tsouris (episodes: 1 - 735)

Panagiotis Bougiouris

Sofoklis Kaskaounias

Nicholas Kouroumzis

Maria Fiaka

Fani Sokratous (episodes: 1 - 735)

Andreas Georgiou

Niovi Spyridaki

Elena Liasidou

Katia Nikolaidou

Stratos Tzortzoglou

Natalia Dragoumi

Danae Christou

Yannis Tsimitselis

Monika Meleki

Christina Terezopoulou
