= Notis Peryalis =

Greek actor

Nótis Peryális
- Νότης Περγιάλης
- Nótis Peryális in a scene from the film Trelós kai páthis Elládos (1983)
- Born: 16 August 1920; Anogeia, Laconia, Greece
- Died: 10 November 2009 (aged 89); Ágioi Theódoroi, Corinthia, Greece
- Education: Vasíli Róta Drama School
- Known for: Actor, playwright, screenwriter, lyricist

Notis Pergialis ( Greek: Νότης Περγιάλης), 16 August 1920 - 10 November 2009) was a Greek writer, actor, director and lyricist. He appeared in more than thirty films from 1953 to 1983. Until his death, he staged theatrical performances with an amateur group at Agioi Theodoroi.

== Biography ==
He was born in Anogia, Laconia. His real name was Georgios Nikolopoulos (Greek: Γεώργιος Νικολόπουλος). He studied at the theatrical school founded by Vassilis Rotas. Since 1949 he has worked as an actor and writer in theater, cinema and radio. However, he emerged more as an actor in cinema and television, playing characteristic roles. He wrote many plays, such as "Pain Gives Birth to Gods", which was awarded the prize of the Kalokairinios competition, "Sunborn" and "The Girl with the Ribbon", "Song in Messolonghi" (directed by Pelos Katselis as part of the Messolonghi festivities in 1957), "Eichmann and the Parrot" (1971), "Golden Pill" and "Antigone of the Occupation" (People's Theatre Manos Katrakis 1954, 1958 and 1960 respectively), "Masks for Angels" (Elsa Vergi Company 1959), "Crazy Moon" (Arma Theatre 1965), "This Tree Wasn't Called Patience" (Hatziskos Nikiforakis Company 1974-5) etc.

He is the lyricist of the very famous song Let's take a walk to the moon, the music of which was written by Manos Hadjidakis. He is also the lyricist of the songs O leventis, Ti na tina konou ti khara, To bloko tis Kaisariani, composed by Mikis Theodorakis, of the song Gremismena ssypto with music by Yannis Markopoulos, Nyfiatiko strogo etc.

He wrote the script and participated as narrator in the television series Christ Recrucified (1975) (television adaptation of the novel the same name written by Nikos Kazantzakis) directed by Vasilis Georgiadis.

Author of the book "When the Trees Rise" (novel 1971), "Atar Never Dies" (1971), "The Red Bird", Synchroni Epochi Editions, Athens, 1990, 120 p., (ISBN 960-224-232-9) etc.

Also the plays "Chekhov's Neighborhood" (1976) (National Theatre - New Stage - December 1976 - Direction: Dinos Dimopoulos), "Magic City" (1963) (Musical review in collaboration with Iakovos Kambanellis and music by Mikis Theodorakis), "Open the Door" (1986) and the radio play "The Horse of Thanasis" (recorded in 1954 and directed by Nikos Gatsos in which he also participates as an actor). He also wrote the screenplays-adaptations for the radio sketch plays "Lambros and Maria" (1954) (Manolis Skouloudis) and "O Astrapogiannos" (1954) (Aristotles Valaoritis), the musical score of which was made by Mikis Theodorakis. He also played in the radio play by Pavlos Nirvanas "Maria the Pentagiotissa" (adaptation by Mary Veaki, directed by Mitsos Lygizos and recorded in 1958).

His works have been translated into English, French, German and Danish languages.

He made his debut in Lemos Troupe (1950), at the "Dionysia" Theater in Kallithea.

He was said to have been inspired by romanticism and symbolism, as well as by Federico García Lorca. He drew themes from the lives of ordinary people, which he described with sensitivity and humanity.

He was a regular member of the Society of Greek Playwrights, the Society of Greek Writers, the International Theater Center and the Greek Actors' Union, whose activities he has helped.

He has been honored with the Gold Medal of the Holy City of Messolonghi, the Newspaper Critics Award at the Thessaloniki Festival.

He was a permanent resident of Nea Smyrni, Athens.

== Selected filmography ==
| Year | Title | Role | Notes |
|---|---|---|---|
| 1956 | A Girl in Black | Antonis | |
| 1962 | Electra | Electra's Husband | |
| 1963 | The Red Lanterns | Old Man | |
| 1965 | The Young Will Live | | |
| 1966 | Blood on the Land | Marinos Antypas | |
