= Panikos sta scholeia =

Panikos sta scholeia Πανικός στα σχολεία
- Directed by: Dimis Dadiras
- Written by: Giorgos Mylonas
- Starring: Giannis Voglis; Mary Chronopoulou; Nikos Apergis; Nelli Gini; Anestis Vlahos; Lefteris Gyftopoulos
- Music by: Giorgos Katsaros
- Distributed by: Greca Film Lefakis
- Release date: January 1982
- Running time: 108 minutes
- Country: Greece
- Language: Greek

Panikos sta Scholeia (Greek: Πανικός στα σχολεία, "Panic in the Schools") is a 1982 Greek crime thriller film directed by Dimis Dadiras, written by Giorgos Mylonas and starring Giannis Voglis, Mary Chronopoulou and Apostolos Sougklakos.

== Plot ==
Alexandros Makris (Giannis Tsilivakos), a student in an Athens school dies from a drug overdose. His father, Giannis Makris (Giannis Voglis), will try to uncover the drug dealers responsible for his only child's death and take revenge for it.

== Cast ==
- Giannis Voglis as Giannis Makris
- Mairi Chronopoulou as Vicky
- Nikos Apergis as Andreas Pavlou
- Giannis Tsilivakos as Alexandros Makris
- Nelli Gini as Miranda
- Anestis Vlahos as Markos Avgeris
- Lefteris Gyftopoulos as Fanis Politis
