= Games of Desire =

1964 German-French drama film

Games of Desire (German: Die Lady) is a German-French drama film released in 1964 and featuring Swedish star Ingrid Thulin in the lead role.

== Plot ==
Nadine Anderson, an elegant upper-class woman, leads a marriage defined by luxury and cocktail parties, which bores her to no end. Her husband Eliot is Sweden's ambassador to Athens, and his lack of interest in sex causes Nadine great sexual frustration. This marriage is only for show; in reality, Eliot is exclusively interested in men and has more than just an eye on his young, attractive secretary Martin Troge. Nadine is no longer willing to continue this deeply unsatisfying life of constant inner emptiness. She craves sex, preferably dirty sex. And so, night after night, she roams the dimly lit alleys of Piraeus, the port of Athens, always on the lookout for "real men" who can give her everything her husband is neither able nor willing to give her. Soon, the lady's search for meaning threatens to spiral out of control. During the day, she is the epitome of a noble society lady, but in the evening, Nadine indulges her desire for wild men and works as a prostitute with her own room.

One night, she meets Nikos, a dockworker who perfectly embodies her idea of a "real man." Their happiness would be complete if his sister Elektra, also a prostitute and part-time stripper, hadn't discovered Nadine's true identity. Sensing a big opportunity, she tries to blackmail the ambassador's wife. Elektra wants to finally leave her miserable existence behind and demands that Nadine hire her as a maid for a decent salary. Nadine yields to this emphatically expressed wish, and Elektra now becomes part of the embassy's human inventory – much to Eliot Anderson's displeasure, because his secretary Martin falls in love with the racy, southern beauty, who is almost the same age as him, during a yacht trip. Eliot immediately dismisses Elektra and, in order not to lose Martin to the girl, plans a trip on which his secretary is to accompany him so that Elektra disappears from his field of vision.

In a fit of rage, the fired Elektra reveals to her now former employer that his wife is not only cheating on him and having an affair with her brother Nikos, but also tells him about the lady's other extramarital activities; in short, that Nadine is a prostitute. For the homosexual husband, this revelation is far less serious than expected; he simply wants to keep up appearances in the future. And so, under the pretext of recovering from too much dolce far niente in a Swiss sanatorium, he allows Nadine to continue her affair with her virile dockworker. Furious that her intrigues have come to nothing, Elektra goes to her brother and tells him that his girlfriend is in fact the wife of the Swedish ambassador to Greece. This revelation leads to a violent argument between the siblings, as a result of which Nikos violently beats Elektra. The young girl dies as a result. His relationship with Nadine is over, and she leaves him.

== Production ==
The movie was filmed mainly in Greece. The rarely shown film passed German censorship on September 25, 1964 and was premiered on October 2, 1964. The sets were designed by Max Mellin and built by Tibor Rednas. Some years after its original release, the film was reissued under the provocative title Countess Porno of Ecstasy (German: Gräfin Porno von Ekstasien).

== Reception ==
The German-language review magazine Films called it a "three-star story that does not live up to its artistic standards and is unacceptable in its basic attitude." The Encyclopedia of international Film called it an "ambitiously designed film collage."

== Cast ==
- Ingrid Thulin as Nadin
- Paul Hubschmid as Ellina
- Nikos Kourkoulos as Niko
- Claudine Auger as Elect
- Bernard Verley as Martina
