= Apollo Goes on Holiday =

- Directed by: Giorgos Skalenakis
- Starring: Elena Nathanael; Thomas Fritsch
- Music by: Yannis Markopoulos
- Release date: 5 February 1968
- Running time: 88 min
- Country: Greece
- Language: Greek

Apollo Goes on Holiday (Greek: Επιχείρησις Απόλλων) is a 1968 Greek comedy film directed by Giorgos Skalenakis.

== Cast ==
- Elena Nathanael - Elena
- Thomas Fritsch - Prince Jan
- Athinodoros Prousalis - Manolis
- Christos Tsaganeas - Ambassador
- Caroline Christensen - Nora
- Giorgos Bartis - Photographer
- Aris Maliagros - Baron
- Ulla Bergryd - Tourist
