= David di Donatello for Best Foreign Director =

Italian film award (1966–1990)

The David di Donatello for Best Foreign Director (Italian: David di Donatello per il miglior regista straniero) is a category in the David di Donatello Awards, described as "Italy’s answer to the Oscars". It was awarded by the Accademia del Cinema Italiano (ACI, Academy of Italian Cinema) to recognize outstanding efforts on the part of non-Italian film directors during the year preceding the ceremony. The award was given from 1966 until 1990.

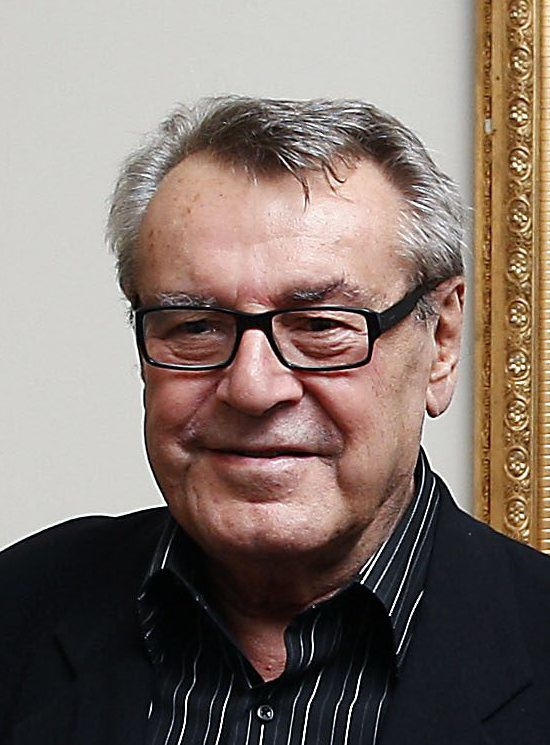
Miloš Forman was the first to win the award three times

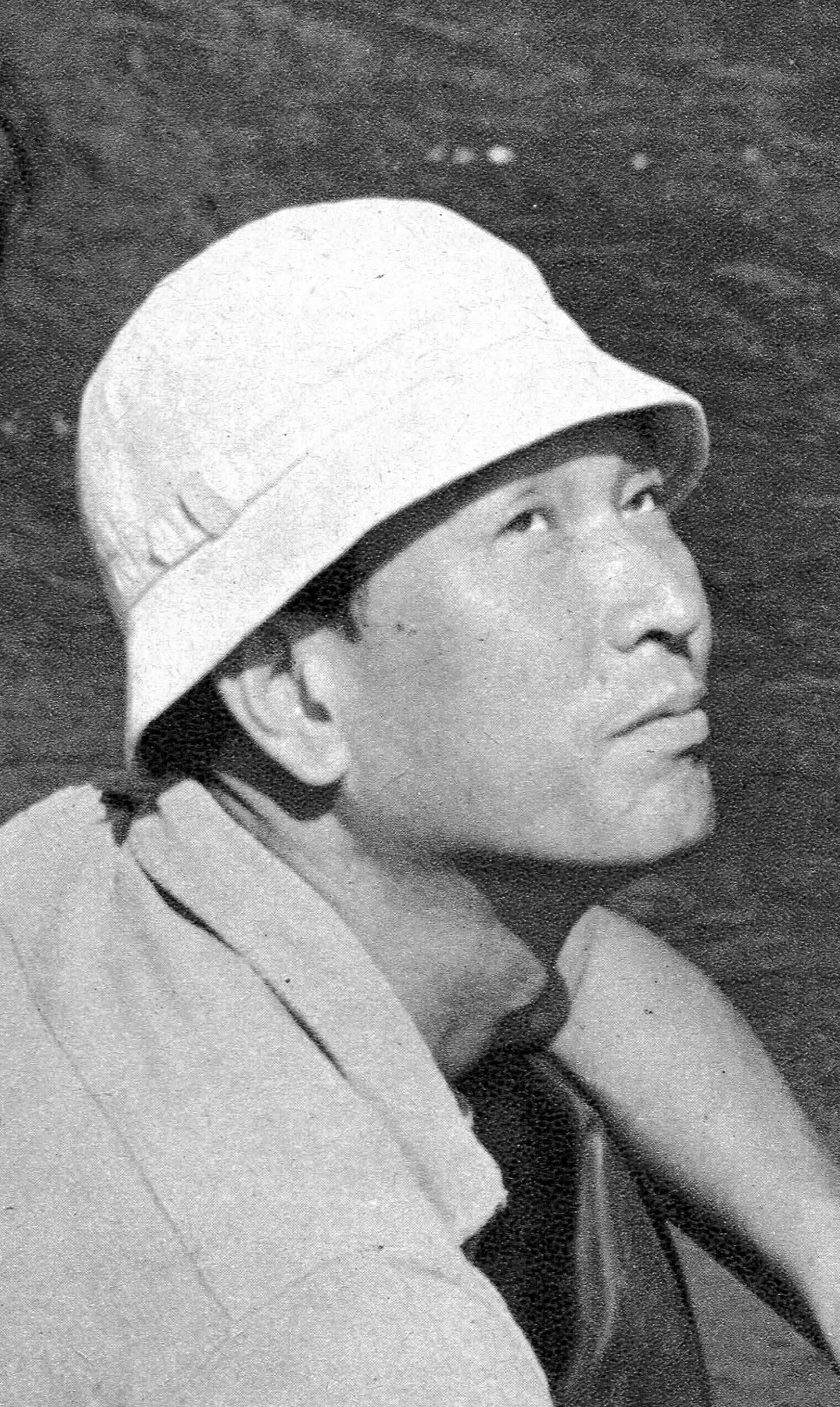
Akira Kurosawa tied Miloš Forman for most wins in the category, with three awards as of 1986

== Winners and nominees ==
Winners are indicated in bold.

=== 1960s ===
1966

- **John Huston** - The Bible: In the Beginning

1967

- **David Lean** - Doctor Zhivago

1968

- **Richard Brooks** - In Cold Blood

1969

- **Roman Polanski** - Rosemary's Baby

=== 1970s ===
1970

- **John Schlesinger** - Midnight Cowboy

1971

- **Claude Lelouch** - Le Voyou

1972

- **John Schlesinger** - Sunday Bloody Sunday

1973

- **Bob Fosse** - Cabaret

1974

- **Ingmar Bergman** - Viskningar och rop

1975

- **Billy Wilder** - The Front Page

1976

- **Miloš Forman** - One Flew Over the Cuckoo's Nest

1977

- **Akira Kurosawa** - Dersu Uzala

1978

- **Herbert Ross** - The Goodbye Girl ex aequo
- **Ridley Scott** - The Duellists ex aequo

1979

- **Miloš Forman** - Hair

=== 1980s ===
1980

- **Francis Ford Coppola** - Apocalypse Now

1981

- **Akira Kurosawa** - Kagemusha
- Pál Gábor - Angi Vera
- Martin Scorsese - Raging Bull

1982

- **Margarethe von Trotta** - Die bleierne Zeit
- István Szabó - Mephisto
- Warren Beatty - Reds

1983

- **Steven Spielberg** - E.T.: The Extra-Terrestrial
- Blake Edwards - Victor Victoria
- Costa Gavras - Missing

1984

- **Ingmar Bergman** - Fanny och Alexander
- Woody Allen - Zelig
- Andrzej Wajda - Danton

1985

- **Miloš Forman** - Amadeus
- Sergio Leone - Once Upon a Time in America
- Roland Joffé - The Killing Fields

1986

- **Akira Kurosawa** - Ran
- John Huston - Prizzi's Honor
- Sydney Pollack - Out of Africa
- Emir Kusturica - When Father Was Away on Business

1987

- **James Ivory** - A Room with a View
- Luis Puenzo - The Official Story
- Alain Cavalier - Thérèse

1988

- **Louis Malle** - Au revoir les enfants
- Stanley Kubrick - Full Metal Jacket
- John Huston - The Dead

1989

- **Pedro Almodóvar** - Mujeres al borde de un ataque de nervios
- Barry Levinson - Rain Man
- Woody Allen - Another Woman

=== 1990s ===
1990

- **Louis Malle** - Milou en mai
