= Christos Negas =

Greek actor

Christos Negas Χρήστος Νέγκας
- Born: 1936; Zakynthos, Greece
- Died: June 21, 1981 (aged 44–45); Sounio, Greece
- Occupation: actor

Christos Negas (Greek: Χρήστος Νέγκας; 1936 – June 21, 1981) was a Greek actor. He studied at the “Theatro Technis” drama school and graduated from the “Kostis Mihailides” drama school. He made his first film appearance in 1960, starring in To agrimi. His filmography mostly consists of dramatic, comedic and action roles. He suffered a heart attack while swimming and subsequently died on June 21, 1981, in Sounio. The Zakynthos Open-Air Cinema was named in his honour. He was the father of radio producer Athinais Nega.

== Filmography ==
Listed alphabetically:

Film	Year	Transliteration and translation	Role
Aponi zoi	1964	Άπονη ζωή	Petros Galanis
Air, Air, Air	1972	Αέρα, αέρα, αέρα Aera, Aera, Aera	Alexis
Goodbye Forever	1967	Αντίο για πάντα Adio gia panda	Hristos
Dakrysmena matia	1967	Δακρυσμένα μάτια	Alekos
Epihirissi Dourios Ipos	1966	Επιχείρηση Δούρειος Ίππος	-
Eklapsa pikra gia sena	1964	Έκλαψα πικρά για σένα	Kostas
Gia tin timi kai ton erota	1969	Για την τιμή και τον έρωτα	Spyros Kladas
Give Me Your Hands	1971	Δώστε τα χέρια Doste ta heria	Hristos Apostolou
I diki sou mira me serni	1964	Η δική σου μοίρα με σέρνει	Alexis Vitalis
The Fate of an Orphan	1965	Η μοίρα μιας ορφανής I mira mias orfanis	-
I modistroula	1964	Η μοδιστρούλα	Nikos Stathatos
Hearts That Know How To Love	1967	Καρδιές που ξέρουν ν' αγαπούν Kardies pou xeroun nagapoun	Vangelis
Katara me derni varia	1965	Κατάρα με δέρνει βαριά	-
Klaio kai s anazito	1965	Κλαίω και σ' αναζητώ	Tonis Danalis
Methystakas tou limaniou	1967	Μεθύστακας του λιμανιού	Foivos Stratis
O babas mou ki ego	1963	Ο μπαμπάς μου κι εγώ	Giorgos
O polyteknos	1964	Ο πολύτεκνος	Loukas
Orphans in Five Roads	1964	Ορφανή στους πέντε δρόμους Orfani stous pende dromous	Giorgos
Paranomi pothi	1966	Παράνομοι πόθοι	Petros
Pligomena niata	1969	Πληγωμένα νιάτα	Giorgos
Ponessa poli gia sena	1964	Πόνεσα πολύ για σένα	Kostas Haridimos
To agrimi	1960	Το αγρίμι	Dinos
The Laughs of Pythia	1979	Το χαμόγελο της Πυθίας; To chamogelo tis Pythias	-
Tosa oneira stous dromous	1968	Τόσα όνειρα στους δρόμους So Many Dreams on the Streets	Pavlos
Fevgo me pikra sta xena	1960	Φεύγω με πίκρα στα ξένα	-
Ftochologia	1965	Φτωχολογιά	Nikos
Chilies para mia nychtes	1960	Χίλιες παρά μια νύχτες A Thousand for One Nights	-
