= Nikos Kourkoulos =

Greek theatrical & film performer (1934-2007)

- Born: December 5, 1934; Athens, Greece
- Died: January 30, 2007 (aged 72); Athens, Greece
- Resting place: Zografou Cemetery, Athens
- Occupation: Actor
- Years active: 1958-2007
- Spouses: Melita Koutsogiannis (m. 1966; div. 1987) Marianna Latsis (m. 2003)
- Children: 4

Nikos Kourkoulos (Greek: Νίκος Κούρκουλος; December 5, 1934 – January 30, 2007) was a Greek theatrical and film actor. Kourkoulos is best known to Greek audiences for playing "Angelos Kreouzis" in Oratotis miden, but he also appeared in other movies such as To Homa vaftike kokkino, Exodos kindynou, O Astrapogiannos, O Katiforos among others.

== Life and career ==
Nikos Kourkoulos grew up in the Athens district of Zografou. His father was a barber from Makrades, Corfu. As young sports and football were his loves. He belonged to Panathinaikos F.C. roster during his school years. Acting came before him rather accidentally. As he himself had claimed, he decided to become an actor after reading books on theatre.

He studied acting at the National Theatre of Greece's School of Drama, and made his stage debut in a 1958 Athens production of Alexandre Dumas, fils' La dame aux camélias, opposite Ellie Lambeti and Dimitris Horn.

He was one of the founders of the prestigious musical group, Proskinio and appeared in the 1967 Broadway musical, Illya Darling, with Melina Mercouri, in a role for which he was nominated for a Tony Award as a best supporting actor.

For most of the 1960s/70s, Kourkoulos' success was unparalleled by any other Greek actor, except Dimitris Papamichael, but Kourkoulos' choice of material was more challenging than the latter's. He created his personal group in the early 1970s, with a repertory which included, among others, Franz Kafka's The Trial, Arthur Miller's View from the Bridge and Brecht's The Threepenny Opera. His last stage appearance was in the title role of Sophocles' Philoktitis (1991) at the restored ancient theater of Epidaurus in southern Greece. In 1995, he was named as Artistic Director of the National Theatre of Greece, an institution he managed to turn into a profitable organization without compromising on artistic integrity.

His film career was successful: he starred in many films from the late 1950s until the early 1980s. His most commercial films have been melodramas with a social background, like Visibility Zero (Ορατότης Μηδέν) (1970).

He was awarded twice at the Thessaloniki Film Festival with the Best Actor Prize for his performance in Adistaktoi (Αδίστακτοι 1965) and Astrapogiannos (Αστραπόγιαννος 1970). For five (5) years (1975–1980) he was President of the Society of Greek Theatre Actor-Managers.

Nikos Kourkoulos died at the Errikos Dynan Hospital, Athens, on 30 January 2007, after a long battle with cancer, aged 72. He was survived by his companion of twenty years, Marianna Latsi (daughter of Greek shipping billionaire Yiannis Latsis), and four children: Errieta and Philip from his relationship with Marianna Latsis, and Melita and Alkis from his legal marriage.

== Theatrical performances ==
Nikos Kourkoulos headed companies and his own theatre in Athens and Thessaloniki, and played leading roles in:

- Euripides, Medea, 1959
- Thornton Wilder, Our Town, 1960
- Jean Giraudoux, Ondine, 1962
- R & A Goetz, The Heiress, 1962
- Samuel A. Taylor, Sabrina Fair, 1963
- William Shakespeare, Julius Caesar, 1964
- Luigi Pirandello, Clothing The Naked, 1964
- Frank Wedekind, Lulu, 1965
- Never on a Sunday (Illya Darling), 1967, in the United States (directed by Jules Dassin, with Melina Mercouri, in a production nominated for a Tony Award)
- Franz Kafka, The Castle, 1964, and The Trial, 1971
- Euripides, Orestes, 1971
- Sławomir Mrożek, Tango, 1972
- Bertholt Brecht, The Threepenny Opera, 1975 (as Macheath, with Melina Mercouri as Jenny), directed by Jules Dassin
- Anton Chekhov, The Seagull, 1976
- Harold Pinter, The Homecoming, 1977
- Jean Anouilh, Ring Round the Moon, 1978
- Neil Simon, The Odd Couple, 1980, directed by Andreas Voutsinas
- Sophocles, Oedipus the King, 1982
- Ugo Betti, Reciprocation, 1983, directed by Minos Volanakis
- Arthur Miller, A View from the Bridge, 1986
- Dale Wasserman, One Flew Over the Cuckoo's Nest, 1987
- Sophocles, Philoctetes, 1991

== Filmography ==
- To Telefteo psemma 1957, A Matter of Dignity
- Barbayannis, o kanatas 1957, Barbayiannis, the potter
- Erotikes istories 1959, Erotic stories
- Bouboulina 1959
- Amaryllis, to koritsi tis agapis 1959, Amaryllis, the girl of love
- I Kyria dimarhos 1960, Lady mayor
- Kalimera Athina 1960, Goodmorning Athens
- To Hamini 1960, The Guttersnipe
- Dyo hiliades naftes kai ena koritsi 1960, Two thousands sailors and one girl
- Mana mou, ton agapisa 1961, Mother, I loved him
- O Katiforos 1961, The Slip
- Gia sena tin agapi mou 1961, For you my love
- To Taxidi 1962, The travel
- Orgi 1962, Fury
- Syntrimmia tis zois 1963, Debris of life
- Lola tis Troubas 1964, Lola of Trouba
- Enas megalos erotas 1964, One big love
- Dipsa gia zoi 1963, Thirst for life
- Amfivolies 1964, Doubts
- Games of Desire 1964
- To Homa vaftike kokkino 1965, Blood on the Land
- Adistaktoi 1965, Unhesitating
- Koinonia, ora miden 1966, Society, time zero
- Katigoro tous anthropous 1966, I Blame the people
- Epitafios gia ehthrous kaí filous 1966, Epitaph for enemies and for friends
- Kataskopoi sto Saroniko 1968, Agents on Saronic (Gulf)
- Gymnoi sto dromo 1968, Nudes on the street
- Bandits in Rome 1968
- Oratotis miden 1970, Visibility Zero
- O Astrapogiannos 1970
- Katahrisis exousias 1971, Αbuse of Power
- Me fovo kai me pathos 1972, With fear and with passion
- O Ehthros tou laou 1972, The Enemy of people
- Thema syneidiseos 1973, Issue of conscience
- I Diki ton dikaston 1974, The Trial of judgemen
- Ena gelasto apogevma 1979, One happy afternoon
- Exodos kindynou 1980, Exit of danger
- To Fragma 1982, The Dam
- To 13o Kivotio 1992, The 13th Kit (TV Series)
