= Kostas Andritsos =

Greek film director

- Born: 1 May 1916; Athens
- Died: 10 October 1993 (aged 77)
- Other names: George Andrews
- Occupations: Film director; writer
- Notable work: Aera! Aera! Aera!

Kostas Andritsos, also known as George Andrews (Greek: Κώστας Ανδρίτσος; 1 May 1916, Athens – 10 October 1993) was a Greek film director and writer.

== Selected filmography ==
- Oneira koritsion 1953
- Bouboulina 1959
- Exo oi kleftes! 1961
- Apolytrosis 1961 with Spiros Focás, Lorella De Luca
- Scream 1964
- Aera! Aera! Aera! (1972).
