= Vasilis Georgiadis =

Greek film director and actor

- Born: 12 August 1921; Dardanelles, Ottoman Empire (now Turkey)
- Died: 30 April 2000 (aged 78); Athens, Greece
- Occupation: Film director
- Years active: 1956–1993

Vasilis Georgiadis (Greek: Βασίλης Γεωργιάδης; 12 August 1921 – 30 April 2000) was a Greek film director and actor. His films The Red Lanterns (1963) and Blood on the Land (1966) were nominated for the Academy Award for Best Foreign Language Film.

== Selected filmography ==
- Aces of the Stadiums (1956)
- Diakopes stin Kolopetinitsa (1959)
- Periplanomenos Ioudaios (1959)
- Krystallo (film)|Krystallo (1959)
- Flogera kai Aima (1961)
- Min Erotevesai to Savvato (1962)
- Orgi (1962)
- I Katara tis Manas (1962)
- The Red Lanterns (1963)
- Gamos Ala Ellinika (1964)
- Blood on the Land (1966)
- I Evdomi Mera tis Dimiourgias (1966)
- Girls in the Sun (1968)
- One Night for Love (1968)
- Agapi gia Panta (1969)
- O Mplofatzis (1969)
- The Battle of Crete (1970)
- Ekeino to kalokairi (1971)
- Synomosia sti Mesogeio (1975)
