= Aris Maliagros =

Greek actor, tenor

- Born: 17 August 1895; Argostoli, Kefalonia, Greece
- Died: 18 December 1984 (aged 89)
- Occupation(s): Actor, tenor

Aris Maliagros (Greek: Άρης Μαλιαγρός; also Aris Malliagros (Άρης Μαλλιαγρός); 17 August 1895 – 18 December 1984) was a Greek actor who played several aristocratic roles. He was famous as the "master with the monocle".

== Biography ==
Maliagros studied at the school in the National Theatre. He appeared onstage for the first time at Fioro of Levante (1914). He later appeared in Christinaki (1916), A Chocolate Soldier (1918–19), Butterfly (1919–20), The Dance Countess (1922), The Misanthrope, Hamlet, King Lear, The Merchant of Venice, Cymbeline, The Merry Wives of Windsor, and Arravoniasmata.

== Filmography ==
Year	Title	Transliteration and translation	Role	Notes
1917	O aniforos tou Golgotha		-	
1930	Filisse me, Maritsa	(Φίλησέ με, Μαρίτσα = Kiss Me, Maritsa)	Aris	
1961	I 900 tis Marinas	(Οι 900 της Μαρίνας = A 900 from Marina)	Spyros Dalegkos	
1961	I haramofaides	(Οι χαραμοφάηδες = Good for Nothing)	Leandros	
1961	Eno sfirize to treno	(Ενώ σφύριζε το τρένο = I Hae Whistled the Train)	-	
1962	Zito i trela	(Ζήτω η τρέλα = The Stupids Lives On)	-	
1962	I ginekes theloun xilo	(Οι γυναίκες θέλουν ξύλο = The Ladies Deserves A Spanking)	-	
1962	O gabros mou, o dikigoros!		-	
1963	Triti kai 13		Leonidas Massouridis	
1964	I vila ton orgion	(Η βίλα των οργίων = The Orgy's Villa)	Christoforos Tsimiskis	
1964	O emiris kai o kakomoiris		-	
1964	To doloma	(Το δόλωμα)	Wealthy card player	
1964	An ehis tyhi	(Αν έχεις τύχη = If You Have Any Luck)	Consul	
1965	O ouranokatevatos		Alkis Chatziabeoglou	
1965	Moderna Stachtopouta	(Μοντέρνα Σταχτοπούτα)	Triandis	
1966	Diploneies	(Διπλοπενιές)	-	
1966	Dama spathi	(Ντάμα σπαθί)	Doctor	
1966	I yineka mou trelathike	(Η γυναίκα μου τρελάθηκε = The Woman Is Nuts)	Telis	
1966	O xipolitos prigkips	(Ο ξυπόλυτος πρίγκηψ = The Naked Prince)	Iakovos	
1966	O kabouris	(Ο καμπούρης = The Hunchback)	-	
1966	Anthropos yia oles tis doulies	(Άνθρωπος για όλες τις δουλειές = A Man for All the Chores)	Elli's grandfather	
1967	I thalassies i hadres	(Οι θαλασσιές οι χάντρες)	Aryiris Loubakis	
1967	Kati kourasmena palikaria		Argyris Loubakis	
1967	I kori mou, i pseftra		Nick Papas	
1968	Apollo Goes on Holiday	(Επιχείρησις Απόλλων = Epihirisis Apollon)	ambassador	
1971	O epanastatis popolaros		-	
1972	I Aliki diktator		Orestis Papakaradontis	
1972	I Rena ine ofsaid	(Η Ρένα είναι οφσάιντ = Rena is Offside)	President Kokkinaikou	(final film role)

== See also ==
- Giorgos Gavriilidis
- Hristos Tsaganeas
