= Anne Lonnberg =

American actress

- Born: Berkeley, California, United States
- Occupations: actress, singer
- Years active: 1965–1988

Anne Lonnberg is an American actress and singer of Swedish descent.

== Life and career ==
Lonnberg was born in Berkeley, California to a Swedish father. She began her acting career in 1965, starring mostly in Greek films. She has appeared throughout her career in a number of American and French films and television series, but only supporting roles. Lonnberg is best remembered for playing the museum guide and one of Drax's girls in the James Bond film Moonraker (1979). Her last role was in the film The Unbearable Lightness of Being (1988), in which she played a Swiss photographer. She has not starred in any other films or series since.

Lonnberg has also made a singing career at the time she started acting, and released a few albums and songs where she sings in French and English.

Lonnberg is fluent in both English and French, and has lived in France for several years. She is the author of novels with the name Anne de Pasquale.

== Filmography ==
- 1965: To nisi tis Afroditis
- 1968: Girls in the Sun – Annabel Stone
- 1968: Appointment with a Stranger – Irene
- 1968: Mother Goes Greek
- 1971: The Deadly Trap – Babysitter (uncredited)
- 1974: Paul and Michelle – Susannah
- 1975: Operation Daybreak - Sonja
- 1975: Love and Death – Olga
- 1975: Synomosia sti Mesogeio – Samantha
- 1976: Seven Nights in Japan – Jane Hollander
- 1977: The Simple Past – Josepha
- 1978: Le dernier amant romantique
- 1979: Moonraker – Museum Guide
- 1979: Ciao, les mecs – Nicole
- 1979: Le divorcement – Eva
- 1982: L'amour des femmes – Hélène
- 1988: The Unbearable Lightness Of Being – Swiss Photographer

== Discography ==
- 1969: Anne Lonnberg Lp – Label Riviera
