= Manos Katrakis =

Greek actor

Manos Katrakis Μάνος Κατράκης
- Born: Emmanuel Katrakis; 14 August 1908; Kastelli Kissamou, Cretan State
- Died: 2 September 1984 (aged 76); Alexandra Hospital, Athens, Greece
- Resting place: First Cemetery of Athens
- Years active: 1928-1984
- Spouses: Anna Lori (m. 1934; div. 1935); Linda Alma (m. 1979)
- Awards: San Francisco International Film Festival; Golden Gate Award; 1961 Antigone; International Thessaloniki Film Festival; Greek Competition Award; 1961 Synoikia to Oneiro

Emmanuel "Manos" Katrakis (Greek: Εμμανουήλ (Μάνος) Κατράκης; 14 August 1908 – 2 September 1984) was a Greek actor of theater and film.

== Biography ==
Born on 14 August 1908 in Kastelli, Cretan State, he was the youngest of five children of Haralambos Katrakis and Irini Katraki. When Manos was 10 years old, his family moved from Crete to Athens, where his father searched for work. His brother, Giannis, emigrated to North America. Manos played soccer during his youth for the Athinaikos football team and others.

Along with actor/director Kostas Leloudas, he acted in his first movie To Lavaro tou '21 in 1928. He later performed in the Ethniko Theatro (the National Theatre) in 1931. During the 1930s, he continued acting in theatrical plays (he was friends with the maestro Dimitris Mitropoulos). He married Anna Lori in 1943.

He took part in the resistance as a member of EAM/ELAS and after refusing to sign a declaration of repentance during the Greek Civil War of 1946–49, he was exiled to Makronisos, along with such other well-known figures as Yiannis Ritsos, Nikos Koundouros, Mikis Theodorakis and Thanasis Veggos.

In the 1950s he returned to Athens from Makronisos but there was little acting work. He was handed both small and big roles in plays and films. In 1954, he met the dancer Linda Alma (real name Eleni Malioufa). Since then they lived together and got married in 1979, which lasted up to his death. Shortly before his death, he filmed his last and best movie Taxidi sta Kythira, the Journey to Kythera/Kythira, with director Theo Angelopoulos.

== Death and legacy ==
Katrakis had been an avid smoker for most of his life. He died from lung cancer at Alexandra Hospital on 2 September 1984, at age 76. He was survived by his wife, Linda Alma. Alma died in 1999 at the age of 72. In 2009 the Greek Post Office issued a €0,01 postage stamp in honor of Katrakis.

== Selected filmography ==
- To Lavaro tou '21 (1929) .... Dimos
- Etsi kaneis, san agapiseis (1931)
- O Agapitikos tis voskopoulas (1932) .... Liakos
- Prosopa lismonimena (1946) .... Nikos Markidis (voice, uncredited)
- Katadromi sto Aigaion (1946) .... Lt. Cdr. Giannis Raidis
- Oi Germanoi xanarhontai... (1948) .... German soldier (uncredited)
- Marinos Kontaras (1948) .... Marinos Kontaras
- I Floga tis eleftherias (1952) .... narrator (voice)
- Eva (1953) .... Alekos
- O dromos me tis akakies (1954) .... Hristos Vranas
- Magiki polis (1954) .... Narrator
- Antigone (1961) .... Creon
- Synoikia to Oneiro (1961) .... Nekroforas
- Flogera kai aima (1961) .... Stathis Vlahopanagos
- Electra (1963) .... tutor
- Thriamvos (1962) .... Bournokos
- Enas delikanis (1963) .... father
- O Adelfos Anna (1963) .... Father Vasileios
- The red lanterns (1963) .... Kapetan Nikolas
- Athoa i enohi? (1963) .... Alekos
- Prodosia (1964) .... Professor Viktor Kastriotis
- Diogmos (1964)
- Oi Epikindynoi (1964)
- Enomenoi sti zoi kai sto thanato (1964) .... Captain Seratos
- To Bloko (1965)
- O Metanastis (1965)
- Istoria mias zois (1965) .... Mikes Papadimas
- Blood on the land (1966) .... father Hormovas
- Sparagmos (1965)
- O Epanastatis (1965)
- Katigoro tous anthropous (1966) .... Elefterios Dimitropoulos
- I Exodos tou Mesolongiou (1966)
- Dakrya gia tin Ilektra (1966) .... Tassos Petridis
- Tora pou fevgo ap' ti zoi (1966)
- Sklavoi tis moiras (1966) .... Mr. Delipetrou
- O Katatregmenos (1966) .... Labros Sarioglou
- Mazi sou, gia panta (1966)
- Erotas stin kafti ammo (1966) .... Nikolas
- Eho dikaioma na s' agapo! (1966)
- Aihmalotoi tou pepromenou (1966) .... Hristos
- Aharisti (1966)
- Kontserto gia polyvola (1967) .... General Dareios
- Ti ki an gennithika ftohos (1967) .... Mr. Razis
- O Labiris enantion ton paranomon (1967)
- To Kanoni kai t' aidoni (1968)
- I Leoforos tou misous (1968) .... Legatos
- Xerizomeni genia (1968) .... Manthos
- Tosa oneira stous dromous (1968) .... Mose Aron
- Tha kano petra tin kardia mou (1968) .... Pantelis
- Mia mera, o pateras mou (1968)
- Katigoroumeni, apologisou (1968)
- Jane Eyre (1968) .... Edward Rodgester
- I Lygeri (1968) .... Konstadis Matrozos
- I Kardia enos aliti (1968) .... Manos Sarris
- As me krinoun oi gynaikes (1968) .... Angelos Bartis
- Kynigimeni prosfygopoula (1969) .... Argyris
- Prosfygas, O (1969) .... Thanasis Daoutis
- Koureli tis zois (1969) .... Yiannis Romanis
- Kakos, psyhros ki anapodos (1969) .... Alekos Valiris
- I Thysia mias gynaikas (1969)
- I Sfragida tou Theou (1969) .... Yiannis
- I Ora tis alitheias (1969)
- I Leoforos tis prodosias (1969) .... Brig. Gen. Gerakaris
- Gia tin timi kai gia ton erota (1969) .... Pavlos
- Filise me, prin fygeis gia panta (1969) .... Stavros Karapanos
- Oratotis miden (1970) .... Horst Richter
- Aftoi pou milisan me ton thanato (1970) .... Lykourgos Venetis
- I Zougla ton poleon (1970) .... Lysias Sekeris
- To Teleftaio fili (1970)
- Ores agapis, ores polemou (1970)
- Katigoro tous dynatous (1970) .... Labros Kontarinis
- Esena mono agapo (1970) .... Vyronas Derkos
- Katahrisis exousias (1971)
- Me fovon kai pathos (1972) .... Alexandros Viaskos
- I Aliki diktator (1972) .... Eleftherios (uncredited)
- Horis syneidisi (1972) .... Kostas Dellis
- Antartes ton poleon (1972) .... Fotis's father
- Oi Prostates (1973) .... Petros Rallis
- I Fonissa (1974) .... narrator (voice)
- I Diki ton dikaston (1974) .... Theodoros Kolokotronis
- Mado mavrogenous (1974)
- Kravgi gynaikon (1978) .... Kreon
- O Ilios tou thanatou (1978) .... Papa-Giannis
- O Efialtis (1978)
- Eleftherios Venizelos (1980) .... Petros
- O Anthropos me to garyfallo (1980) .... Nikolaos Plastiras
- Voyage to Cythera (1984) .... Spyros
- Ta Hronia tis thyellas (1984) .... old man (final film role)
