= Giorgos Skalenakis =

Film director

- Born: 17 May 1926; Port Said, Egypt
- Died: 14 September 2014 (aged 88)
- Occupations: Film director, actor
- Years active: 1957–1991

Giorgos Skalenakis (Greek: Γιώργος Σκαλενάκης; 17 May 1926 – 14 September 2014) was a Greek film director and actor.

== Selected filmography ==
- Dancing the Sirtaki (1966)
- Queen of Clubs (1966)
- Oh! That Wife of Mine (1967)
- Imperiale (1968)
- Apollo Goes on Holiday (1968)
