= Nikos Foskolos =

Greek director and screenwriter (1927–2013)

- Νίκος Φώσκολος
- Born: Nikolaos Foskolos; 26 November 1927; Irakleio, Attica, Greece
- Died: 30 October 2013 (aged 85); Evangelismos Hospital, Athens, Greece
- Resting place: Municipal Cemetery Heliopolis
- Citizenship: Greece
- Education: National and Kapodistrian University of Athens (attended)
- Occupations: Director; screenwriter; playwright; novelist; film critic; lyricist; journalist
- Years active: 1957–2006
- Employer: Finos Film
- Spouses: Ekaterini Foskolou (divorced) Eleni Foskolou (divorced) Tonia Vithoulka (m. 1987)
- Children: 2

Nikolaos Foskolos (Greek: Νικόλαος Φώσκολος; 26 November 1927 – 30 October 2013) was a Greek director, screenwriter, playwright, film critic and novelist. He is one of the most commercially successful screenwriters of Greek cinema. He has been called the "Goldfinger of commercial shows". He has been described as "the maître of exaggeration" and "the king of TV shows". His film Ipolochagos Natassa kept the most commercially successful film record for almost three decades from 1970 to 1999.

== Life and career ==
Nikolaos Foskolos was born on 26 November 1927, in Irakleio, Attica. He studied Political Science at the University of Athens but did not graduate. From the age of 17, he started writing successful radio plays with both a historical and modern background. His radio series Police Stories were the most popular radio series for three years. In the 1960s, he worked as a theatre critic and also wrote plays for the theatre and radio. He wrote screenplays for over 70 Greek films, mostly working for Finos Film. He introduced Spaghetti Westerns to Greek cinema.

His TV daily serial Lampsi was a huge success and ran for 14 seasons getting into the Guinness World Records in 1995. He gained another entry into the Guinness World Records for writing two daily TV series, Lampsi and Kalimera Zoi, for ten years. Lampsi was shown for 13 years from 1991 to 2005 with a total of 3457 episodes produced.

In the 1970s, his TV serial Agnostos Polemos (Unknown War) broke the record of TV ratings with 92% of Greek households tuning in to the show. Foskolos has been described as an "important screenwriter", a "talented director", a "wonderful human being" and "the father of TV-serials and films". Ta Nea refers to him as "hyperproductive". The same paper also calls him polygrafotatos translating as "a prolific writer".

Foskolos married three times, with his first wife, Ekaterini, they had a son, Spyros (b. 1951), and with his second, Eleni, they had a daughter, Dela (b. 1963). Eleni passed away in January 2020. He married actress Tonia Vithoulka in 1987.

He was taken to Evangelismos Hospital in the early hours of 30 October 2013, and died from complications of gastrointestinal bleeding, at age 85. He was buried in Municipal Cemetery Heliopolis on 1 November 2013.

== Interview ==
In a 1999 interview to the Vima newspaper, Foskolos said that he wonders if the political reality in Greece has surpassed even his own screenplays and said that he thinks that Greek society has "fallen into a vertical aquarium of corruption". He said than in one scene of his film Koinonia, Ora Miden (Society, Hour Zero) a corrupt politician offers millions to Nikos Kourkoulos, who was playing the role of the honest hero of the film, to buy his silence for a crime committed by his cohorts. The politician told the hero that the price they had to pay was selling their conscience for their livelihood. Foskolos then remarked that the story he wrote for the film turned out to be prescient in the years that followed.

== Awards ==
Foskolos has received awards for The Asphalt Fever (Πυρετός στην άσφαλτο), and The Ruthless (Οι αδίστακτοι). His film Blood on the Land (Το χώμα βάφτηκε κόκκινο) was an Academy Awards Best Foreign Film nominee in 1965. He also received three awards and a state award for Concert for Machine Guns (Κοντσέρτο για πολυβόλα).
