= Thessaloniki Festival of Greek Cinema =

Thessaloniki Film Festival
- Location: Thessaloniki, Greece
- Founded: 1960
- Disestablished: 1991
- Successor: Greek State Film Awards, Thessaloniki International Film Festival
- Language: Greek

The Thessaloniki Film Festival started in 1960 and at the beginning comprised exclusively Greek films. The first years (1960–1965) the festival was called "Week of Greek Cinema". From 1965 to 1991 the festival was called Festival of Greek Cinema and from 1992 became an international film festival as the Thessaloniki International Film Festival. Since 1992, Greek films compete in a different section of the festival with the name Greek State Film Awards. Since 2008, the Greek competition was abolished and remained only the international section of the festival. Today the Greek films compete in Hellenic Film Academy Awards. Below are considered the awards of Thessaloniki Film Festival during the period that only Greek films took part (1960–1991).

The awards comprise the categories: best film, best director, best screenplay, best editing, best cinematography, best actor, best actress, best supporting actor, best supporting actress, best music and other.

== Best Film ==
Season	Best Film	Director	Sources
1960	Not given		
1961	Not given		
1962	Electra	Michael Cacoyannis	
1963	Young Aphrodites	Nikos Koundouros	
1964	Diogmos	Grigoris Grigoriou	
1965	No Mr. Johnson	Michalis Grigoriou	
1966	Forgotten Heroes	Nikos Gardelis	
1967	Silouettes	Kostas Zois	
1968	Parenthesi	Takis Kanellopoulos	
1968	Girls in the Sun	Vasilis Georgiadis	
1969	The Girl of 17	Petros Lykas	
1970	Reconstitution	Theodoros Angelopoulos	
1971	What Did You Do in the War, Thanasi?	Dinos Katsouridis	
1972	To proxenio tis Annas	Pantelis Voulgaris	
1973	Lavete Theseis	Thodoros Maragos	
1974	Kierion	Dimos Theos	
1974	Modelo	Kostas Sfikas	
1975	The Travelling Players	Theodoros Angelopoulos	
1976	Happy Day	Pantelis Voulgaris	
1977	Iphigenia	Michael Cacoyannis	
1978	1922	Nikos Koundouros	
1979	Anatoliki Perifereia	Vasilis Vafeas	
1980	Alexander the Great	Theodoros Angelopoulos	
1981	Ergostasio	Tasos Psaras	
1982	Aggelos	Giorgos Katakouzinos	
1983	Rembetiko	Costas Ferris	
1984	Loafing and Camouflage	Nikos Perakis	
1985	Stone Years	Pantelis Voulgaris	
1986	Knock-Out	Pavlos Tasios	
1986	Karavan Serai	Tasos Psaras	
1987	Theophilos	Lakis Papastathis	
1987	Ta Paidia tis Chelidonas	Kostas Vrettakos	
1988	Akatanikitoi erastes	Stavros Tsiolis	
1989	Not given		
1990	Erotas sti Chourmadia	Stavros Tsiolis	
1991	Not given		

== Best Director ==
Season	Best Director	Sources
1960	Nikos Koundouros for The River	
1961	Michael Cacoyannis for Eroica	
1962	Michael Cacoyannis for Electra	
1963	Nikos Koundouros for Young Aphrodites	
1964	Grigoris Grigoriou for Diogmos	
1965	Not Given	
1966	Roviros Manthoulis for Prosopo me Prosopo	
1967	Dinos Dimopoulos for Pyretos stin Asphalto	
1968	Dimis Dadiras for Sta Synora tis Prodosias	
1969	Petros Lykas for The Girl of 17	
1970	Errikos Andreou for I Antarsia ton 10	
1971	Errikos Andreou for Papaflessas	
1972	Theodoros Angelopoulos for Days of 36	
1973	Tonia Marketaki for Ioannis o Viaios	
1974	Kostas Ferris for I Fonissa	
1975	Theodoros Angelopoulos for The Travelling Players	
1976	Pantelis Voulgaris for Happy Day	
1977	Not Given	
1978	Nikos Koundouros for 1922	
1979	Nikos Nikolaidis for The Wretches Are Still Singing	
1980	Nikos Panagiotopoulos for Melodrama	
1981	Lakis Papastathis for Ton Kairo ton Ellinon	
1982	Christoforos Hristofis for Roza	
1983	Nikos Vergitsis for Revanche	
1984	Vassilis Vafeas for O Erotas tou Odyssea	
1985	Pantelis Voulgaris for Stone Years	
1986	Pavlos Tassios for Knock-Out	
1987	Nikos Vergitsis for Archipelagos tou Pathous; Nikos Nikolaidis for Morning Patrol	
1988	Giorgos Karypidis for Sti Skia tou Fovou; Stavros Tsiolis for Akatanikitoi Erastes	
1989	Not Given	
1990	Nikos Nikolaidis for Singapore Sling	
1991	Not Given	

== Best Screenplay ==
Season	Best Screenplay	Sources
1960	Giorgos Roussos for Madalena	
1961	Not given	
1962	Not given	
1963	Not given	
1964	Panos Kontelis for Prodosia	
1965	Michalis Grigoriou for No Mr. Johnson	
1966	Panos Glykofrydis for Me tis Lampsi sta Matia	
1967	Gianos Kontelis for O 13os	
1968	Iakovos Kampanellis for To Kanoni kai t' Aidoni	
1969	Petros Glykas for The Girl of 17	
1970	Not given	
1971	Asimakis Giolamas, Ntinos Katsouridis for What Did You Do in the War, Thanasi?	
1972	Pavlos Tassios for Ne men Alla	
1973	Tonia Marketaki for Ioannis o Viaios	
1974	Not given	
1975	Theodoros Angelopoulos for The Travelling Players	
1976	Not given	
1977	Not given	
1978	Giorgos Skourtis for Double Moon In August	
1979	Not given	
1980	Not given	
1981	Lakis Papastathis for Ton Kairo ton Ellinon	
1982	Giorgos Katakouzinos for Aggelos	
1983	Not given	
1984	Nikos Perrakis for Loafing and Camouflage	
1985	Manousos Manousakis for I Skiahtra	
1986	Nikos Papatakis for Photograph	
1987	Vaggelis Gkoufas, Kostas Koutsomitis and Giorgos Bramos for Kloios; Kostas Vrettakos, Soula Drakopoulou for Ta Paidia tis Helidonas	
1988	Not given	
1989	Not given	
1990	Vasiliki Iliopoulou for To Perasma	
1991	Not given	

== Best Actor ==
Season	Best Actor	Sources
1960	Dimitris Horn for Mia tou Klefti	
1961	Dimitris Horn for Woe to the Young	
1962	Titos Vandis for Poliorkia	
1963	Petros Fyssoun for Adelfos Anna	
1964	Petros Fyssoun for Prodosia	
1965	Nikos Kourkoulos for Adistahtoi	
1966	Giorgos Fountas for Me ti Lampsi sta Matia	
1967	Giorgos Fountas for Pyretos stin Asphalto	
1968	Kostas Prekas for Sta Synora tis Prodosias	
1969	Lambros Konstantaras for O Mplofatzis	
1970	Nikos Kourkoulos for Astrapogiannos	
1971	Thanasis Veggos for What Did You Do in the War, Thanasi?	
1972	Thanasis Veggos for Thanasi Pare t'Oplo Sou	
1973	Manolis Logiadis for Ioannis o Viaios	
1974	Michalis Mpagiaridis for Di'Asimanton Aformi	
1975	Vangelis Kazan for The Travelling Players	
1976	Not given	
1977	Not given	
1978	Not given	
1979	Stavros Xenidis for To Taxidi tou Melitos; Hristos Valavanidis for The Wretches Are Still Singing	
1980	Antonis Antoniou for Paraggelia	
1981	Vasilis Diamantopoulos for Learn How to Read and Write, Son	
1982	Michalis Maniatis for Aggelos	
1983	Titos Vandis for Prosohi Kindinos	
1984	Nikos Kalogeropoulos for Loafing and Camouflage	
1985	Takis Moshos for Meteoro kai Skia	
1986	Giorgos Kimoulis for Knock-out	
1987	Dimitris Kataleifos for Theofilos	
1988	Giorgos Konstas for Sti Skia tou Fovou	
1989	Gerasimos Skiadaresis for Dexiotera tis Dexias	
1990	Lazaros Andreou for Erotas sti Hourmadia	
1991	Minas Hatzisavvas for Kleisti Strofi	

== Best Actress ==
Season	Best Actress	Sources
1960	Aliki Vougiouklaki for Madalena	
1961	Irene Papas for Antigone	
1962	Irene Papas for Electra	
1963	Ilya Livykou for Enas Ntelikanis	
1964	Xenia Kalogeropoulou for Gamos ala Ellinika	
1965	Elli Fotiou for Epistrofi	
1966	Voula Zouboulaki for Syntomo Dialeimma	
1967	Pery Poravou for Silouettes	
1968	Elena Nathanail for Rantevou me mia Agnosti	
1969	Sofia Roubou for The Girl of 17	
1970	Not given	
1971	Maro Vasileiou for Evdokia	
1972	Anna Vagena for To Proxenio tis Annas	
1973	Not given	
1974	Maria Alkaiou for I Fonissa	
1975	Eva Kotamanidou for The Travelling Players	
1976	Not given	
1977	Tatiana Papamoschou for Iphigenia	
1978	Eleonora Stathopoula for 1922	
1979	Betty Livanou for Taxidi tou Melitos	
1980	Not given	
1981	Mirka Papakonstantinou for Oi Dromoi tis Agapis Einai Nyhterinoi; Anna Mantzourani for Learn How to Read and Write, Son	
1982	Olia Lazaridou for To Stigma; Eva Kotamanidou for Roza	
1983	Giota Festa for Revanche; Sotiria Leonardou for Rebetiko	
1984	Not given	
1985	Themis Bazaka for Stone Years; Pemi Zouni for Mia Toso Makrini Apousia	
1986	Eleonora Stathopoulou for Itan Enas Isihos Thanatos	
1987	Mary Chronopoulou for Ta Paidia tis Helidonas	
1988	Not given	
1989	Aleka Paizi for Gamos sto Perithorio	
1990	Meredyth Herold for Singapore Sling	
1991	Dimitra Hatoupi for I Alli Opsi	

== Best Supporting Actor ==
Season	Best Supporting Actor	Sources
1960	Pantelis Zervos for Madalena	
1961	Manos Katrakis for Synoikia to Oneiro	
1962	Not given	
1963	Not given	
1964	Not given	
1965	Not given	
1966	Not given	
1967	Not given	
1968	Kostas Mpakas for Girls in the Sun	
1969	Christos Politis for The Girl of 17	
1970	Ilias Logothetis for Vavylonia	
1971	Lavrentis Dianellos for Olokaftoma	
1972	Kostas Rigopoulos for To Proxenio tis Annas	
1973	Manolis Logiadis for Ioannis o Viaios	
1974	Not given	
1975	Not given	
1976	Not given	
1977	Not given	
1978	Vassilis Laggos for 1922	
1979	Not given	
1980	Not given	
1981	Not given	
1982	Not given	
1983	Andreas Vaios for Prosoji Kindinos; Dimitris Poulikakos for Rebetiko	
1984	Vassilis Tsanglos for I Kathodos ton Ennea	
1985	Minas Hatzisavvas for Ta Paidia tou Kronou	
1986	Fani Hinas for Knock-out	
1987	Vasilis Diamantopoulos for Ta Paidia tis Helidonas	
1988	Kostas Hatzoudis for Fakelos Polk Ston Aera	
1989	Giorgos Ninios for Dexiotera tis Dexias	
1990	Manolis Vamvakousis for Viotehnia Oneiron	
1991	Giorgos Ninios for Isimeria and O Drapetis	

== Best Supporting Actress ==
Season	Best Supporting Actress	Sources
1960	Zorz Sarri for Englima sta Paraskinia	
1960	Athina Michailidou for Efialtis	
1962	Not given	
1963	Not given	
1962	Not given	
1963	Not given	
1964	Not given	
1965	Not given	
1966	Not given	
1967	Not given	
1968	Ilya Livykou for Sta Synora tis Prodosias	
1969	Not given	
1970	Toula Stathopoulou for Reconstitution	
1971	Miranta Kounelaki for I Haravgi tis Nikis	
1972	Smaragda Veaki for To Proxenio tis Annas	
1973	Zorz Sarri for Oi Prostates	
1974	Not given	
1975	Not given	
1976	Not given	
1977	Not given	
1978	Not given	
1979	Not given	
1980	Not given	
1981	Not given	
1982	Not given	
1983	Themis Bazaka for Rebetiko	
1984	Not given	
1985	Dimitra Hatoupi for Mia Toso Makrini Apousia	
1986	Mirka Kalantzopoulou for Karavan Serai	
1987	Olia Lazaridou for Archangelos tou Pathous	
1988	Toula Stathopoulou for Lipotaktis	
1989	Olga Tournaki for Gamos sto Perithorio and Athoos I Enohos	
1990	Not given	
1991	Matina Moschovi for Korakia	

== Best cinematography ==
Season	Best Cinematography	Sources
1960	Aristeidis Karidis for Englima sta Paraskinia	
1961	Dimos Sakellariou for Synoikia to Oneiro	
1962	Jiovanni Mariano, Dimitris Danalis for Ouranos	
1963	Dimos Sakellariou for Enas Delikanis	
1964	Nikos Gardelis for Prodosia	
1965	Dimos Sakellariou, Ntinos Katsouridis for Oi Adistahtoi	
1966	Syrakos Danalis for I Ekdromi	
1967	Stamatis Trypos for Silouettes	
1968	Stamatis Trypos, Syrakos Danalis for Parenthesi	
1969	Dimitris Papakonstantis for OXI	
1970	Giorgos Arvanitis for Reconstitution	
1971	Stamatis Trypos for Ekeino to Kalokairi	
1972	Giorgos Arvanitis for Days of 36	
1973	Nikos Petanidis for Lavete Theseis	
1974	Nikos Kavoukidis for Ta Hromata tis Iridas	
1975	Giorgos Arvanitis for The Travelling Players	
1976	Stavros Hasapis for To Allo Gramma	
1977	Kostas Papagiannakis for I Megali Apofasi	
1978	Nikos Kavoukidis for 1922	
1979	Andreas Mbellis for Periplanisi	
1980	Giorgos Arvanitis for Alexander the Great	
1981	Nikos Smaragdis for Oi Dromoi tis Agapis Einai Nyhterinoi	
1982	Andreas Mpellis for Roza	
1983	Aris Stavrou for Sweet Bunch	
1984	Ntinos Katsouridis for O Erotas tou Odyssea; Christos Triantafyllou for I Poli Pote Den Koimatai	
1985	Giorgos Arvanitis for Mia Toso Makrini Apousia	
1986	Nikos Smaragdis for Itan Enas Isihos Thanatos	
1987	Giorgos Arvanitis for Doxompous	
1988	Giorgos Arvanitis for Stia Skia tou Fovou	
1989	Takis Zervoulakis for Oh! Babylon; Andrea Sinano for Olga Robards	
1990	Aris Stavrou for Singapore Sling	
1991	Andreas Sinanos for Isimeria and O Drapetis	

== Best Music ==
Season	Best Music	Sources
1960	Manos Hatzidakis for The River	
1961	Argiris Kounadis for Antigone (1961 film)	
1962	Kostas Kapnisis for Ta Heria	
1963	Giannis Markopoulos for Young Aphrodites	
1964	Nikos Mamagakis for Monemvasia	
1965	Giannis Markopoulos for I Moira enos Athoou	
1966	Christos Leontis for Me ti Lampsi sta Matia	
1967	Mimis Plessas for Oi Sphaires den Gyrizoun Piso	
1968	Stavros Xarhakos for Girls in the Sun	
1969	Kostas Kapnisis for Panikos	
1970	Not given	
1971	Giannis Spanos for Ekeino to Kalokairi	
1972	Not given	
1973	Vasilis Tenidis for Enas Iroas me Mikroskopia	
1974	Not given	
1975	Stamatis Spanoudakis for Promitheas se Deftero Prosopo	
1976	Dionysis Savopoulos for Happy Day	
1977	Kostas Kapnisis for Alexandros o Megas	
1978	Hristodoulos Halaris for I Ilikia tis Thalassas	
1979	Giorgos Kouroupos for Emphylios Logos	
1980	Kyriakos Sfetsas for Paraggelia	
1981	Dimitris Lekkas and Dimitris Papadimitriou for Ilektrikos Angelos	
1982	Not given	
1983	Hristodoulos Halaris for Prosohi Kyndinos	
1984	Michalis Christodoulidis for I Kathodos ton Ennea	
1985	Dimitris Papadimitriou for I Skiahtra	
1986	Eleni Karaindrou for Kali Patrida Syntrofe	
1987	Dimitris Papadimitriou for Archangelos tou Pathous	
1988	Dimitris Papadimitriou for Stia Skia tou Fovou	
1989	Thesia Panagiotou for Oh! Babylon	
1990	Nikos Kypourgos for Aenigma Est	
1991	Nikos Kypourgos for O Drapetis	

== Best Editing ==
Season	Best Editing	Sources
1978	Tasos Hatzis for O Ilios tou Thanatou; Giorgos Triantafyllou for Oi Tempelides tis Eforis Koiladas	
1979	Andreas Andreadakis for The Wretches Are Still Singing	
1980	Giorgos Tsitsopoulos for Paraggelia	
1981	Takis Giannopoulos for Oi Dromoi tis Agapis Einai Nyhterinoi; Vangelis Gousias for Ton Kairo ton Ellinon	
1982	Not given	
1983	Andreas Andreadakis for Sweet Bunch; Giorgos Tsitsopoulos for Revanche	
1984	Giorgos Triantafyllou for Loafing and Camouflage	
1985	Giorgos Mavropsalidis for I Skiahtra	
1986	Takis Giannopoulos for Itan Enas Isihos Thanatos	
1987	Giannis Tsitsopoulos for Archangelos tou Pathous and Vios kai Politeia	
1988	Takis Giannopoulos for The Striker with Number 9 Vangelis Gousias for Fakelos Polk ston Aera	
1989	Takis Giannopoulos for ROM	
1990	Takis Giannopoulos for Simadia tis Nyhtas	
1991	Not given	

== Best Production Design ==
Season	Best Production Design	Sources
1977	Mikes Karapiperis for To Kleisto Parathyro	
1978	Dionysis Fotopoulos, Mikes Karapiperis for O Ilios tou Thanatou, Oi Tempelides tis Eforis Koiladas, 1922, Kagkeloporta	
1979	Zorzet Themeli for Periplanisi	
1980	Mikes Karapiperis for Alexander the Great	
1981	Stamatis tsarouhas, Angeliki Maragkou for Learn How to Read and Write, Son; Nikos Politis for Ton Kairo ton Ellinon	
1982	Not given	
1983	Marie-Louise Bartholomew for Sweet Bunch	
1984	Damianos Zafiris for O Erotas tou Odyssea	
1985	Ntora Leloudi for Meteoro kai Skia	
1986	Antonis Halkias for Karavan Serai	
1987	Mikes Karapiperis for Doxompous	
1988	Anastasia Arseni for Stia Skia tou Fovou	
1989	Tasos Zografos for Oh! Babylon	
1990	Michalis Sdougkos for Viotehnia Oneiron	
1991	Antonis Dagklidis for Isimeria	

== Best Sound ==
Season	Best Sound	Sources
1978	Mimis Kasimatis for Double Moon in August; Argyris Lazaridis for Ypothesi Polk	
1979	Marinos Athanasoulis for The Wretches Are Still Singing	
1980	A. Lazaridis for Alexander the Great; Ilias Ionesko for Paraggelia	
1982	Not given	
1983	Marinos Athanasopoulos for Sweet Bunch	
1984	Not given	
1985	Not given	
1986	Not given	
1987	Marinos Athanasopoulos for Ta Paidia tis Helidonas; Argyris Lazaridis for Kloios	
1988	Andreas Achladis for The Striker with Number 9	
1989	Not given	
1990	Ntinos Kittou, Kostas Poulintzas for I Niki tis Samothrakis	
1991	Not given	

== Best Costumes Design ==
Season	Best Costumes Design	Sources
1985	Ntora Leloudi for Meteoro kai Skia	
1986	Anastasia Arseni for Karavan Serai	
1987	Ioulia Stavridi for Theofilos	
1988	Not given	
1989	Not given	
1990	Sofia Papahristou for I Niki tis Samothrakis	
1991	Ariadni Papatheofanous for Isimeria	

== Best Make-up ==
Season	Best Make-up	Sources
1985	Stella Vossou for Meteoro kai Skia	
1986	Not given	
1987	Theano Kapnia for Doxompous	
1988	Not given	
1989	Stella Votsou for Dexiotera tis Dexias	
1990	Despoina Mari for Viotehnia Oneiron	
1991	Not given	

== See also ==
- Thessaloniki International Film Festival
- Greek State Film Awards
