= List of Greek films of the 1970s =

A list of notable films produced in Greece in the 1970s.

== 1970s ==
Title	Director	Cast	Genre	Notes
1970
Reconstitution (Αναπαράσταση)	Theo Angelopoulos	Toula Stathopoulou, Yannis Totzikas	Crime drama	4 Awards in Thessaloniki Film Festival; Selected as one of the 10 best Greek films by Greek Film Critics Association
Ipolohagos Natassa; Υπολοχαγός Νατάσσα	Nikos Foskolos	Aliki Vougiouklaki, Dimitris Papamichael	War drama	IMDb
1971
Evdokia (Ευδοκία)	Alexis Damianos	Maria Vassiliou, Koula Agagiotou	Drama	1 Award in Thessaloniki Film Festival; Selected as one of the 10 best Greek films by Greek Film Critics Association
What Did You Do in the War, Thanasi? Τι έκανες στον πόλεμο, Θανάση;	Dinos Katsouridis	Thanasis Veggos, Efi Roditi, Kaiti Labropoulou, Katerina Gogou	Comedy drama	3 Awards in Thessaloniki Film Festival
Abuse of Power	Stavros Tsiolis	Nikos Kourkoulos	Drama	
Marijuana Stop!	Giannis Dalianidis	Zoe Laskari	Comedy	
1972
AERA! AERA! AERA! Αέρα! Αέρα! Αέρα!	Kostas Andritsos	Yannis Voglis, Xenia Kalogeropoulou	War	IMDb
Symmoria eraston	Vangelis Serdaris	Dinos Iliopoulos, Nikos Rizos, Maro Kontou	Comedy	
1973
John the Violent	Tonia Marketaki	Manolis Logiadis	Drama	3 awards in Thessaloniki Film Festival
O Megalos Erotikos; Ο μεγάλος ερωτικός	Pantelis Voulgaris		Documentary	Music by Manos Hadjidakis - IMDb
Thema syneidiseos	Petros Lykas	Nikos Kourkoulos	Drama	
1974
Attila 74 (Αττίλας '74)	Michael Cacoyannis		Documentary	IMDb
The Rehearsal (I Dokimi, Η δοκιμή)	Jules Dassin	Jules Dassin, Olympia Dukakis	Drama	UK-Greek co-production
1975
The Travelling Players (O Thiasos, Ο Θίασος)	Theo Angelopoulos	Eva Kotamanidou, Aliki Georgouli, Vangelis Kazan	Drama	6 Awards in Thessaloniki Film Festival; Selected as one of the 10 best Greek films by Greek Film Critics Association
Evrydiki BA 2O37 (Ευριδίκη ΒΑ 2Ο37)	Nikos Nikolaidis	Vera Tschechowa, John Moore, Niki Triantafillidi	Drama	Greek-West German co-production – IMDb
1976
Happy Day	Pantelis Voulgaris	Zorz Sarri, Giorgos Moschidis, Nikos Bousdoukos, Costa Fyssoun	Drama	Political detainees (undefined place and time); 5 Awards in Thessaloniki Film Festival; Award of Greek Film Critics Association Awards
1977
Iphigenia; Ιφιγένεια	Michael Cacoyannis	Tatiana Papamoschou, Irene Papas, Kostas Kazakos, Panos Mihalopoulos	Drama	Nominated for Oscar; Entered into the 1977 Cannes Film Festival; 2 Awards in Thessaloniki Film Festival
The Hunters; Οι Κυνηγοί	Theodoros Angelopoulos			Entered into the 1977 Cannes Film Festival
Kyr' Giorgis ekpaidevetai, O Ο κυρ-Γιώργης εκπαιδεύεται	Giannis Dalianidis	Dionysis Papagiannopoulos, Tonia Kaziani, Louiza Podimata	Comedy	IMDb
1978
The Idlers of the Fertile Valley	Nikos Panayotopoulos	Vassilis Diamantopoulos, Olga Karlatos	Drama	2 Awards in Thessaloniki Film Festival; Golden Leopard in Locarno International Film Festival
Kravgi gynaikon Κραυγή Γυναικών	Jules Dassin	Melina Mercouri, Ellen Burstyn	Drama	Nominated for a Golden Globe and entered into the 1978 Cannes Film Festival
Apo pou pane gia ti havouza Από πού πάνε για τη χαβούζα	Thanasis Veggos	Thanasis Veggos, Anna Vagena, Takis Miliadis, Alekos Livaditis	Comedy	IMDb
1979
Milo Milo	Nikos Perakis	Veruschka von Lehndorff, Mario Adorf, Andréa Ferréol, Andreas Katsulas, Julien Guiomar, Antonio Fargas, Joe Higgins	Comedy	
The Wretches Are Still Singing; Τα Κουρέλια Τραγουδάνε Ακόμα...	Nikos Nikolaidis	Alkis Panagiotidis, Konstantinos Tzoumas, Rita Bensousan	Drama	4 Awards in Thessaloniki Film Festival
