= Thessaloniki International Film Festival =

Annual film festival held in Thessaloniki, Greece

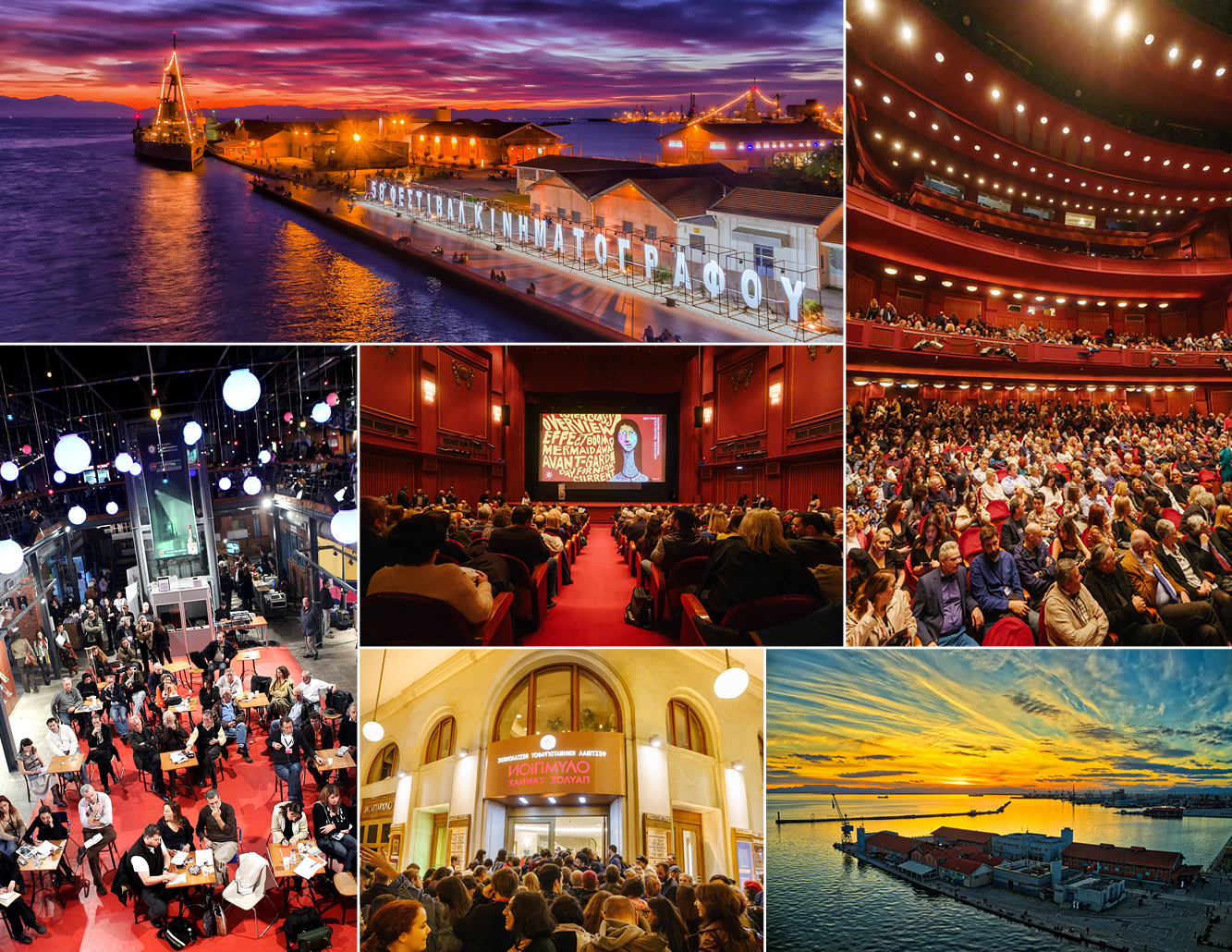
- Location: Thessaloniki, Greece
- Predecessor: Thessaloniki Festival of Greek Cinema
- Founded: 1960
- Most recent: 2024
- Festival date: October 30, 2025 - November 9, 2025
- Language: International
- Website: www.filmfestival.gr

Current: 66th
- 67th 65th

The Thessaloniki International Film Festival (TIFF; Greek: Φεστιβάλ Κινηματογράφου Θεσσαλονίκης, romanized: Festivál Kinimatográfou Thessaloníkis) is a film festival held every November in Thessaloniki, Greece. It is organized by the Thessaloniki Film Festival under the auspices of the Greek Ministry of Culture. It features international competition sections, and its program includes tributes to major filmmakers and national cinemas, as well as sidebar events such as masterclasses, exhibitions, live concerts and workshops. In addition to TIFF, the Thessaloniki Film Festival holds the annual Thessaloniki Documentary Festival (TDF) in March.

== Overview ==
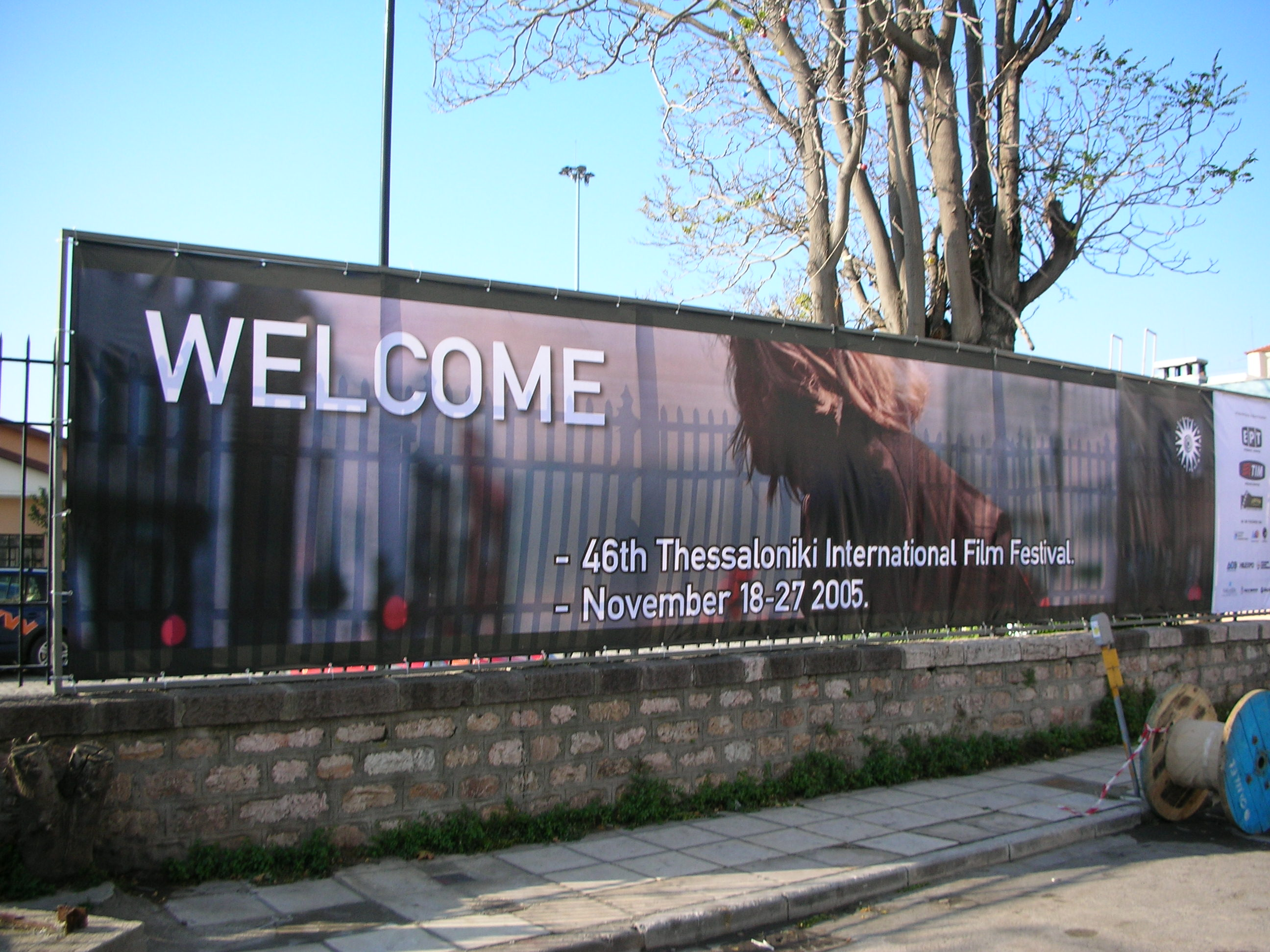
Thessaloniki International Film Festival hoarding.

The Thessaloniki International Film Festival focuses on independent cinema and emerging filmmakers from around the world. The festival serves as an essential platform for film professionals from Greece and Southeast Europe. The event attracts an audience of more than 80.000. Hundreds of Greek and foreign guests, including major figures of the international film scene, have attended TIFF.

TIFF is held at the historical “Olympion” theater at the central Thessaloniki Aristotelous Square and, since 1999, at the Thessaloniki port, in four theaters housed at two newly restored warehouses. The festival hub is Warehouse C, located at the city port; several sidebar events take place at the Thessaloniki Cinema Museum, also part of the Thessaloniki Film Festival Cultural Institution.

TIFF comprises three competition sections: International Competition for the first or second feature film by emerging directors; “Meet the Neighbors” International Competition, for films from the region spanning from Southeast Europe to the Near East; and Virtual Reality (VR) Competition.

Agora is the developmental section of the Thessaloniki Film Festival, reaching out to international film professionals. Agora is one of the most dynamic and constantly growing film markets globally.

== History ==
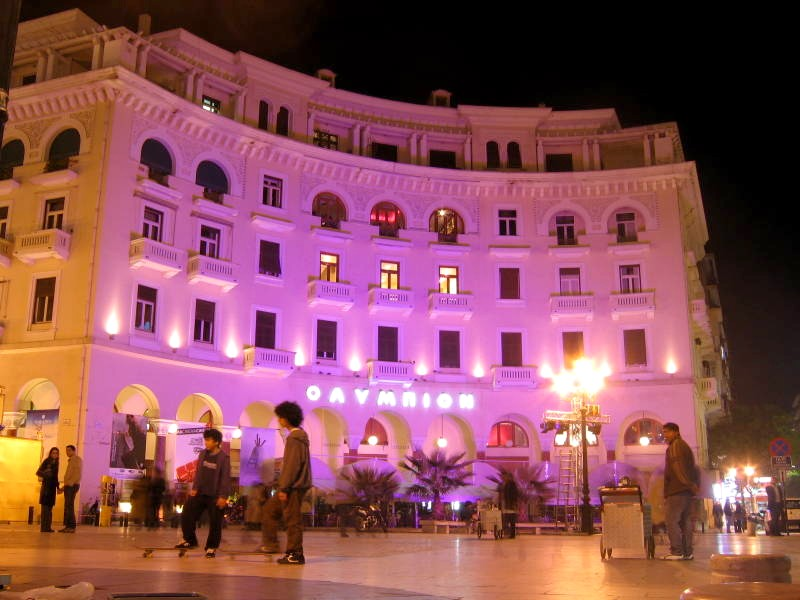
Olympion Theater, where the head office of the festival is located

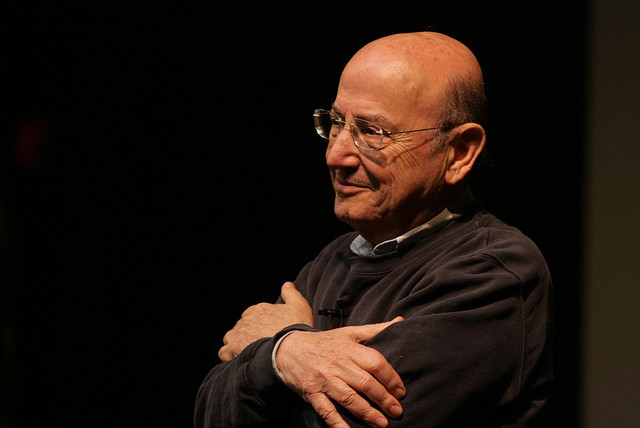
The "Reconstitution" of Theodoros Angelopoulos won the 1970 best film award, marking a turning point in the history of Greek cinema

The Thessaloniki Film Festival was launched as a national film festival in 1960 under the name “Greek Film Week” with the contribution of “Techni” Macedonian Art Society. The event was renamed “Thessaloniki Greek Film Festival” in 1966 and continued as a national film festival until 1991. During these years, the festival closely followed the trends of the national film production, its program highlighting the emergence of the “New Greek Cinema”, while showcasing the work of world cinema auteurs. After the political changeover that followed the 7-year Greek military regime (1967–1974), the festival was intensely politicized, reflecting the political climate of the day, yet keeping its focus on art-house cinema. The event was subject to the Ministry of Trade by 1981 when it came under the auspices of the Greek Ministry of Culture. Following a new national law on cinema, an artistic director was appointed in 1986.

In 1992, during its 33rd edition, TIFF became an international festival under the artistic direction of film critic Michalis Demopoulos. Film director Theo Angelopoulos was appointed president. Since then, the festival has been committed to international independent cinema and the discovery of promising voices from around the world and from the Balkans. Further to showcasing the domestic film production, the festival presents independent films, premieres and tributes to major Greek and international filmmakers while hosting a large number of sidebar events.

== Notable guests and tributes ==
Leading filmmakers that have attended TIFF include Abbas Kiarostami, Nagisa Oshima, Nanni Moretti, Bernardo Bertolucci, Manoel de Oliveira, Ken Loach, Agnès Varda, Béla Tarr, Todd Solondz, Nuri Bilge Ceylan, Francis Ford Coppola, Wim Wenders, Alfonso Cuarón, Oliver Stone, Emir Kusturica, Fatih Akin, Werner Herzog, Takeshi Kitano, Michael Winterbottom, Aki Kaurismäki, Jim Jarmusch, Alexander Payne, Louie Psihoyos and John Waters.

Acclaimed actors, actresses and artists who visited TIFF either as guests or as member of the festival juries include Catherine Deneuve, Harvey Keitel, Faye Dunaway, Isabelle Huppert, John Malkovich, Willem Dafoe, Sam Rockwell, Michael Ondaatje, Jean Marc Barr, Charlotte Gainsbourg, Monica Bellucci, Juliette Binoche and Ralph Fiennes.

TIFF has held the following tributes to acclaimed auteurs, national cinemas and movements:

66th Festival – 2025

Tribute: Plot Twist Beyond the Sixth Sense

Survey Expanded: Fragilities

Isabelle Huppert

Helene Cattet and Bruno Forzani

Marcel Pagnol

Yorgos Tsemberopoulos

65th Festival – 2024

Tribute: We the Monster

Survey Expanded: Un-family-ar

Jesper Just

Panos H. Koutras

64th Festival – 2023

Survey Expanded: Reflections of Topos

Fantasmas Tribute

Takis Kanellopoulos

Spotlight Nikos Perakis

63rd Festival – 2022

Indigenous Cinema

Peter Brooks

Peter Tscherkassky

Eve Heller

Peter Strickland

Alexandar Petrovic

62nd Festival – 2021

Binka Zhelyazkova

Dinos Katsouridis

61st Festival – 2020

Prophesies from Another World: Sci-fi and Cli-fi (1950 - 1990)

Anja Breien

Vera Chytilova

60th Festival – 2019

Gregory Markopoulos and Robert Beavers

Albert Serra

Joanna Hogg

Dušan Makavejev

59th Festival – 2018

Jaime Rosales

Erien Joe'lle Davis

Nanouk Leopold

Cristóbal León & Joaquín Cociña

Greek Queer Cinema

Iordanis Ananiadis

Before the Wave Breaks: the Road to New Romanian Cinema

58th Festival – 2017

Ruben Östlund

Ildikó Enyedi

Armand Gatti

Ida Lupino

From Words to Images: Balkan Literature and Cinema

57th Festival – 2016

Philippe Grandrieux

Leonardo Favio

Zeki Demirkubuz

56th Festival – 2015

Arnaud Desplechin

Focus on New Austrian films

Mircea Daneliuc

55th Festival – 2014

Ramin Bahrani

Roy Andersson

Kornél Mundruczó

Želimir Žilnik

54th Festival – 2013

Contemporary Argentine Cinema

Claire Simon

Alain Guiraudie

Balkan Survey 1994–2013

53rd Festival – 2012

Aki Kaurismäki

Andreas Dresen

Bahman Ghobadi

Cristian Mungiu

Theo Angelopoulos

Costas Zapas

Lior Shamriz

52nd Festival – 2011

Ole Christian Madsen

Sara Driver

Paolo Sorrentino

Ulrich Seidl

Erden Kıral

Éric Baudelaire

Dror Heller

Constantine Giannaris

51st Festival – 2010

Susanne Bier

Dorota Kędzierzawska

Mohamed Al-Daradji

Werner Schröter

Apichatpong Weerasethakul

Croatian Animation: from the Zagreb School to the Present

Borivoj Dovniković-Bordo

Martin Putz

50th Festival – 2009

Werner Herzog

Jeremy Thomas

Philippines Rising

Pinku eiga: beyond Pink

Goran Paskaljević

Ljubomir Šimunić

49th Festival – 2008

Jean-Pierre & Luc Dardenne

Takeshi Kitano

Manos Zacharias

Oliver Stone

Willem Dafoe

Diablo Cody

Haris Zambarloukos

Gustavo Santaolalla

Richard Jobson

Guillermo Navarro

Division and Unity: Cinema in the Middle East

Ousmane Sembène

Terence Davies

Contemporary Turkish Cinema

Spotlight: Romanian Shorts

Ivan Ladislav Galeta

BB-Χ: Hungarian experimental film and the Béla Balázs Studio

48th Festival – 2007

John Sayles

William Klein

Nikos Nikolaidis

Nikos Kazantzakis

Nikos Kourkoulos

Sotiris Moustakas

Sokratis Kapsaskis

Yorgos Skalenakis

New Spanish Cinema

Nae Caranfil

Lee Chang-dong

Yasmin Ahmad

Mikio Naruse

47th Festival – 2006

Wim Wenders

Stavros Tsiolis

Dimos Theos

Alexis Damianos

Greek Screenwriters Spotlight

Yannis Fafoutis

Maria Plyta

Brazilian Cinema

New Cinema from China: Another View

Nuri Bilge Ceylan

Abderrahmane Sissako

Jim McKay

Jan Švankmajer

46th Festival – 2005

Hou Hsiao-hsien

Patrice Chéreau

Vittorio Storaro

Michael Winterbottom

Yorgos Panousopoulos

Nico Papatakis

Antoinetta Angelidis

Park Chan-wook

Focus on Mexican Cinema

Focus on Danish Cinema

Focus on Irish Cinema

Kutluğ Ataman

Seijun Suzuki

Kim Jee-woon

45th Festival – 2004

Abbas Kiarostami

Victor Erice

Kiyoshi Kurosawa

Katerina Thomadaki & Maria Klonari

Kostas Sfikas

Alexis Damianos

Iakovos Kambanellis

Manos Zacharias

Isabelle Huppert

Movies of Our Time: the Best of the New Argentine cinema

Argentine 2004: Wind of Change Still Blowing

New French Cinema

New Russian Cinema

Hirokazu Kore-eda

Götz Spielmann

Todd Verow

Peter Greenaway

44th Festival – 2003

Wong Kar-wai

Otar Iosseliani

João César Monteiro

Nikos Panayotopoulos

Stars of the Steppe

Michael Snow

Shinya Tsukamoto

43rd Festival – 2002

Μarco Bellocchio

Béla Tarr

Bob Rafelson

Pantelis Voulgaris

Giannis Dalianidis

Asian Vision

Jaime Humberto Hermosillo

Hong Sang-Soo

Shirin Neshat

Aurelio Grimaldi

42ο Festival – 2001

John Boorman

Dinos Dimopoulos

Stavros Tornes

Argentinian Cinema: a Time of Changes

German Cinema 2000

French Cinema 2000

US Independents

3x3: Stanley Kwan, Rakhshān Banietemad, Jan Hřebejk

41st Festival – 2000

Jerzy Skolimowski

Theodoros Angelopoulos

Harvey Keitel

New Russian Cinema: after Perestroika

Dinos Katsouridis

New French Cinema

New Austrian Cinema

Agnès Varda

Paulo Branco

40th Festival – 1999

Pedro Almodóvar

Amos Gitai

Tonino Guerra

Man Ray

Portuguese Cinema: the Portuguese Spring

Vassilis Georgiadis

US Independents

New German Cinema

New French Cinema

Alison Anders

39ο Festival – 1998

Ken Loach

Jean-Daniel Pollet

Akira Kurosawa

Asian Vision

3x3: Marcel Grier, François Ozon, Ventura Pons

US Independents

New French Cinema

38ο Festival – 1997

Claude Chabrol

Arturo Ripstein

Manoel De Oliveira

Irene Papas

Takis Kanellopoulos

Tsai Ming-liang

Aleksandr Sokurov

3x3: Tony Gatlif, Errol Morris, Fridrik Thor Fridriksson

Views of the New French Cinema

37ο Festival – 1996

Bernardo Bertolucci

Grigoris Grigoriou

Lucian Pintilie

3x3: Jan Svěrák, Sergei Bodrov, Carlo Mazzacurati

Peter Greenaway

American Independents

36th Festival – 1995

Krzysztof Kieślowski

Nanni Moretti

Frida Liapa

Michael Cacoyannis

Treasures of Iranian Cinema

Mohsen Makhmalbaf

American Independents

Cine Documenta

Sergei Eisenstein

35th Festival – 1994

Nagisa Oshima

Yorgos Tzavelas

Tonia Marketaki

Russian Cinema

Charles Burnett

Michael Haneke

Rainer Werner Fassbinder

Sergei Parajanov

34th Festival – 1993

David Cronenberg

Hal Hartley

Jules Dassin

Alexis Damianos

Pavlos Zannas

== Festival sections ==
The Thessaloniki International Film Festival comprises the following sections:

- International Competition section, screening the first or second film by emerging directors from around the world.
- “Meet the Neighbors” International Competition section, screening films from the region spanning from Southeast Europe to the Middle East.
- Virtual Reality (VR) International Competition section.
- “Open Horizons” program, a selection of cutting-edge and avant-garde independent films.
- Greek Film Festival, a showcase of the year's Greek film production.
- “Balkan Survey”, monitoring contemporary trends of Balkan cinema.
- “Youth screen”, featuring special screenings for schoolchildren and youths.

TIFF's line-up further includes Out-of-Competition films, special screenings and “Carte Blanche” special programs.

== Agora ==
TIFF's "Agora" was launched in 2005, establishing a productive and unique form of helping and introducing professionals visiting Thessaloniki from Southeast Europe, the Mediterranean region and the rest of the world to the industry professionals, consultants, tutors, and potential collaborators invited to the festival.

The Agora includes the following activities:

Agora Film Market

The Agora Film Market promotes the majority of the feature films participating in the official sections of the Festival. Additionally, more titles from the countries that the Agora focuses on are presented, even if they are not part of the festival's main program. In this way, they will have the opportunity to find their way to other international film festivals, sales agents and distributors. The Agora Film Market also includes previous films by the Crossroads participants and a selection of Greek films produced within the last year.

Crossroads Co-Production Forum

Crossroads chooses projects based on the quality of the script, the creative team and the likelihood of their being produced. Crossroads aims to support the producers of feature-length film projects that are linked to Central Europe, the Mediterranean or Balkan countries.

Agora Works in Progress

This industry activity gives the opportunity to selected sales agents, distributors, and festival programmers from all over the world to be the first to discover feature films from the Mediterranean and Balkan countries, in the stage just before completion.

Agora Talks

New directors and producers get the opportunity to learn from renowned film professionals. A day full of discussions where people who wish to establish themselves in the industry can exchange ideas, methods, and approaches about the development of the audiovisual sector.

Thessaloniki Locarno Industry Academy International

Thessaloniki International Film Festival in collaboration with Locarno Film Festival launched in 2016 the Thessaloniki Locarno Industry Academy International in Southeast Europe and the Mediterranean. The Thessaloniki Locarno Industry Academy International is a training program created to help young professionals of the cinema industry –sales agents, distributors, and new media professionals– to extend their experience and networking in the fields of international sales, marketing, distribution and programming.

Meet the Future

A new initiative of the Thessaloniki IFF and the Agora that focuses on the younger generation of Greek filmmakers.

== Awards ==
The films of the International Competition program are eligible for the Best Full-length Feature Film Award “Theo Angelopoulos” (Golden Alexander, 15.000 euros cash prize), the Special Jury Award (Silver Alexander, 8.000 euros cash prize), the Special Jury Award for Best Director (Bronze Alexander), the Best Actor and Actress Awards, and the Best Artistic Achievement or Screenplay Award. The awards are selected by a five-member international jury.

The Best Full-length Feature Film Award (Golden Alexander, 3.000 euros cash prize) is bestowed on a film competing at the “Meet the Neighbors” competition section, awarded by a three-member international jury.

The Best VR Film award (accompanied by a 3.000 euros cash prize) is awarded to the best film in the VR Competition Section.

Independent juries hand parallel awards, including the “Mermaid Award” for the best LGBTQI-themed film, the Youth Jury Awards, the “Human Values Award” granted by the Hellenic Parliament, the awards of the Greek Film Center, the Hellenic Broadcasting Corporation Award, the “J.F. Costopoulos Foundation Award” for a Greek film holding its premiere at the festival, and the “WIFT GR Award” for the best woman's contribution and presence in front or behind the camera.

Further awards are handed by the International Film Critics’ Association (FIPRESCI) and the Greek Association of Film Critics.

Audience Awards are presented to films participating both in the international and the Greek program of the festival.

== Award-winning films ==
=== I. Thessaloniki Greek Film Festival (1960–1991) ===
- 1960: –
- 1961: –
- 1962: Electra, Michael Cacoyannis
- 1963: Young Aphrodites, Nikos Koundouros
- 1964: Diogmos, Grigoris Grigoriou
- 1965: No Mr. Johnson, Michalis Grigoriou
- 1966: Forgotten Heroes, Nikos Gardelis
- 1967: Silouettes, Kostas Zois
- 1968: Parenthesi, Takis Kanellopoulos/Girls in the Sun, Vasilis Georgiadis
- 1969: The Girl of 17, Petros Lykas
- 1970: Reconstitution, Theodoros Angelopoulos
- 1971: What Did You Do in the War, Thanasi?, Dinos Katsouridis
- 1972: To proxenio tis Annas, Pantelis Voulgaris
- 1973: Lavete Theseis, Dinos Katsouridis
- 1974: Kierion, Dimos Theos/Modelo, Kostas Sfikas
- 1975: The Travelling Players, Theodoros Angelopoulos
- 1976: Happy Day, Pantelis Voulgaris
- 1977: Iphigenial, Michael Cacoyannis
- 1978: 1922, Nikos Koundouros
- 1979: Anatoliki Perifereia, Vasilis Vafeas
- 1980: Alexander the Great, Theodoros Angelopoulos
- 1981: Ergostasio, Tasos Psaras
- 1982: Aggelos, Giorgos Kantakouzenos
- 1983: Rembetiko, Costas Ferris
- 1984: Loafing and Camouflage, Nikos Perakis
- 1985: Stone Years, Pantelis Voulgaris
- 1986: Knock Out, Pavlos Tasios/Karavan Serai, Tasos Psaras
- 1987: Theophilos, Lakis Papastathis/Ta Paidia tis Chelidonas, Kostas Vrettakos
- 1988: Akatanikitoi erastes, Stavros Tsiolis
- 1989: –
- 1990: Erotas sti Chourmadia, Stavros Tsiolis
- 1991: –

=== II. Thessaloniki International Film Festival (Golden Alexander, 1992–present) ===
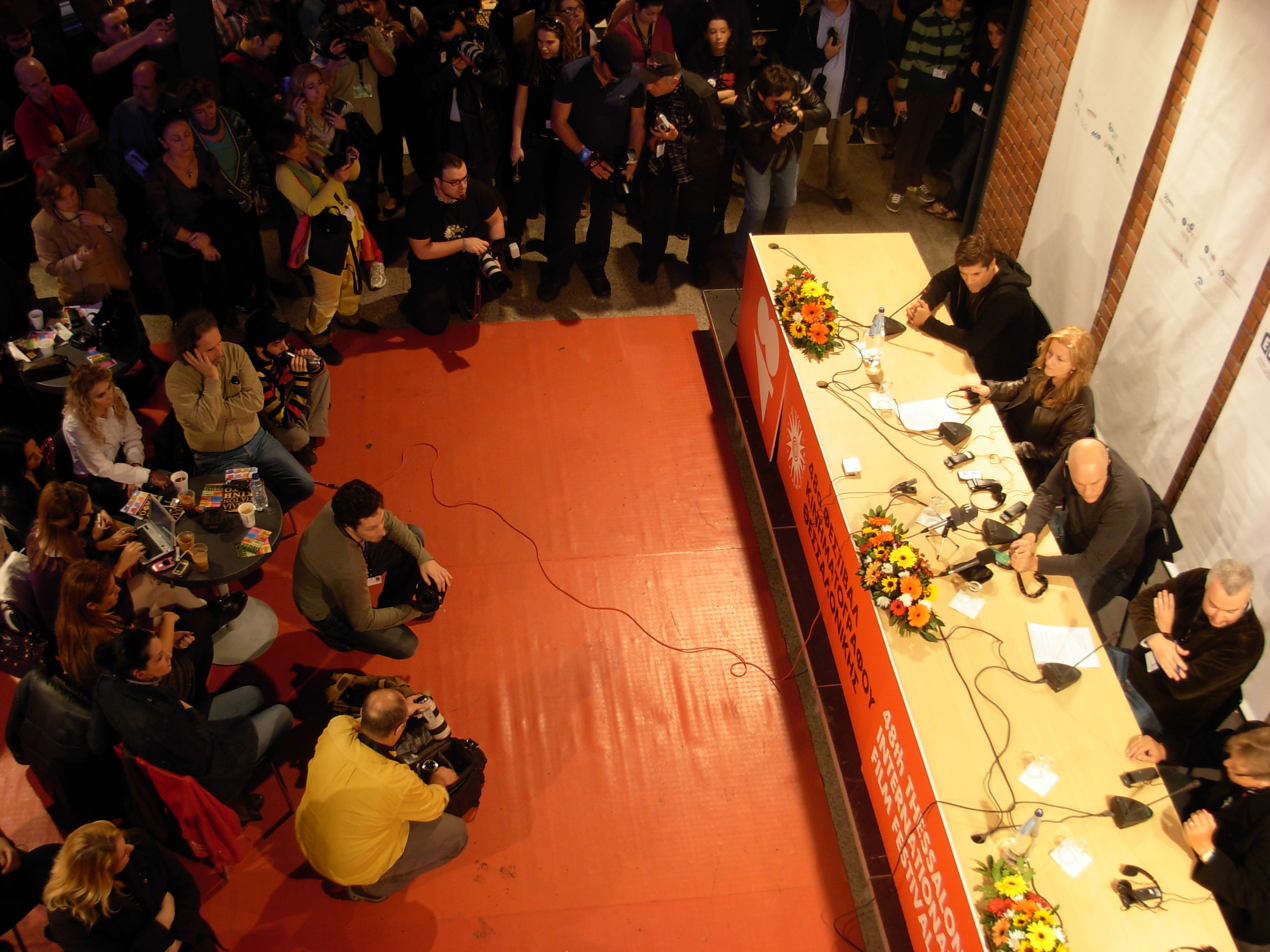
Conference with John Malkovich and former president of the Festival Georges Corraface.

Year	Film	Director	Country of origin
1992	Orlando	Sally Potter	United Kingdom
1992	Dance in the Night	Aleko Tsabadze	Georgia
1993	From the Snow	Sotiris Goritsas	Greece
1994	The Days	Wang Xiaoshuai	China
1995	Postman	He Jianjun	China
1996	Brothers in Trouble	Udayan Prasad	United Kingdom
1997	Road to Nhill	Sue Brooks	Australia
1998	Fishes in August	Yōichirō Takahashi	Japan
1999	Shower	Zhang Yang	China
2000	Last Resort	Paweł Pawlikowski	United Kingdom
2001	Tirana Year Zero	Fatmir Koçi	Albania
2002	Woman of Water	Hidenori Sugimori	Japan
2002	Blissfully Yours	Apichatpong Weerasethakul	Thailand
2003	The Last Train	Aleksei German	Russia
2004	Bitter Dream	Mohsen Amiryoussefi	Iran
2005	Someone Else's Happiness	Fien Troch	Belgium
2006	Family Ties	Kim Tae-yong	South Korea
2007	The Red Awn	Cai Shangjun	China
2008	Over There	Abdolreza Kahani	Iran
2009	Ajami	Scandar Copti and Yaron Shani	Israel / Germany
2010	Periferic	Bogdan George Apetri	Romania
2011	Twilight Portrait	Angelina Nikonova	Russia
2012	A Hijacking	Tobias Lindholm	Denmark
2013	The Golden Cage	Diego Quemada-Díez	Mexico
2014	Perpetual Sadness	Jorge Perez Solano	Mexico
2015	Rams	Grímur Hákonarson	Iceland
2016	Deadly Wheelchairs	Attila Till	Hungary
2017	Ravens	Jens Assur	Sweden
2018	Ray & Liz	Richard Billingham	United Kingdom
2019	Fire Will Come	Oliver Laxe	Spain
2020	Identifying Features	Fernanda Valadez	Mexico/Spain
2021	Softie	Samuel Theis	France
2022	I Have Electric Dreams	Valentina Maurel	Belgium France Costa Rica
2023	Animal	Sofia Exarchou	Greece
2024	Happy Holidays	Skandar Copti	Palestine
2025	Cotton Queen	Suzannah Mirghani	France

=== See also ===
- Cinema of Greece
- Thessaloniki Documentary Festival
- Greek Film Critics Association
- Greek Film Critics Association Awards
- Greek State Film Awards
- List of film festivals
