= Koundouros =

Koundouros (Greek: Κούνδουρος) is a Greek surname. Notable people with the surname include:

- Nikos Koundouros (1926–2017), Greek film director
- Roussos A. Koundouros (1891–1944), Greek lawyer and politician
