= Vortex, the Face of Medusa =

1967 film

The Face of Medusa
- Directed by: Nikos Koundouros
- Written by: Nikos Koundouros; Vangelis Goufas
- Produced by: Nikos Koundouros
- Starring: Philippo Vlachos
- Cinematography: Karlheinz Hummel
- Edited by: Giorgos Tsaoulis
- Music by: Yannis Markopoulos
- Production companies: Cosmos Productions; Minos Films
- Release date: June 1967
- Running time: 90 minutes
- Countries: Greece; United Kingdom
- Language: English

Vortex, the Face of Medusa (Greek: Το πρόσωπο της Μέδουσας, translit. To prosopo tis Medousas and also known as Vortex) is a 1967 Greek-British drama film directed by Nikos Koundouros. It was entered into the 17th Berlin International Film Festival. It features an irresistible beautiful woman on a remote Greek island.

== Cast ==
- Philippo Vlachos as Alexis
- Fanis Hinas as Filippos
- Alexis Mann as Filippos' brother
- Hara Angelousi as Filippos' girlfriend
- George Willing
- Assounda Arka
- Jacqueline Blaire
- Dimitris Coromilas
- Yorgo Voyagis
