= Greek Film Critics Association =

The Greek Film Critics Association or Pan-Hellenic Film Critics Association (PEKK) (Greek: Πανελλήνια Ένωση Κριτικών Κινηματογράφου, ΠΕΚΚ) was founded in 1976. The first members included the Greek film critics Nino Fenek Mikelidis, Vasilis Rafailidis, Yannis Bakogiannopoulos and others. Since 1977, the association belongs to International Federation of Film Critics (FIPRESCI).

Nearly every year, the PEKK gives out awards during Thessaloniki International Film Festival. The Greek Film Critics Association Awards is one of the most important awards for the Greek cinema. The PEKK gives also out award during Short Film Festival in Drama, Greece.

== Best Greek Films of all time ==
The members of PEKK have selected their list of the Best Greek Films of all time on three occasions: initially in 1986, for the 10th anniversary of PEKK; again in 2006, for the 30th anniversary of PEKK; and for a third time in 2016, for the 40th anniversary of PEKK.

=== 1986 selection ===
Place	Movie	Year	original title	Director
1.	Evdokia	1971	Ευδοκία	Alexis Damianos
2.	The Ogre of Athens (a.k.a. The Dragon)	1956	Ο Δράκος	Nikos Koundouros
3.	The Reconstruction	1970	Αναπαράσταση	Theo Angelopoulos
4.	The Travelling Players	1975	Ο θίασος	Theo Angelopoulos
5.	The Counterfeit Coin	1955	Η κάλπικη λίρα	Giorgos Tzavellas
–	The Color of Iris	1974	Τα Χρώματα της Ίριδος	Nikos Panagiotopoulos
7.	Karkalou	1984	Καρκαλού	Stavros Tornes
–	The Matchmaking of Anna	1972	Το Προξενιό της Άννας	Pantelis Voulgaris
9.	Balamos	1982	Μπαλαμός	Stavros Tornes
–	Stella	1955	Στέλλα	Michael Cacoyannis

=== 2006 selection ===
Place	Movie	Year	original title	Director
1.	The Ogre of Athens (a.k.a. The Dragon)	1956	Ο Δράκος	Nikos Koundouros
2.	Evdokia	1971	Ευδοκία	Alexis Damianos
–	The Travelling Players	1975	Ο θίασος	Theo Angelopoulos
4.	Stella	1955	Στέλλα	Michael Cacoyannis
5.	The Counterfeit Coin	1955	Η κάλπικη λίρα	Giorgos Tzavellas
6.	The Reconstruction	1970	Αναπαράσταση	Theo Angelopoulos
–	Rembetiko	1983	Ρεμπέτικο	Costas Ferris
–	The Photograph	1986	Η φωτογραφία	Nikos Papatakis
9.	Karkalou	1984	Καρκαλού	Stavros Tornes
10.	Sweet Bunch	1983	Γλυκιά Συμμορία	Nikos Nikolaidis
–	The Spring Gathering	1999	Η εαρινή σύναξις των αγροφυλάκων	Dimos Avdeliodis

=== 2016 selection ===
Place	Movie	Year	original title	Director
1.	The Travelling Players	1975	Ο θίασος	Theo Angelopoulos
2.	Sweet Bunch	1983	Γλυκιά Συμμορία	Nikos Nikolaidis
3.	The Photograph	1986	Η φωτογραφία	Nikos Papatakis
4.	Rembetiko	1983	Ρεμπέτικο	Costas Ferris
5.	Dogtooth	2009	Κυνόδοντας	Yorgos Lanthimos
6.	The Opposite (a.k.a. Foolish Love)	1981	Οι απέναντι	Giorgos Panousopoulos
7.	Karkalou	1984	Καρκαλού	Stavros Tornes
8.	Ulysses' Gaze	1995	Το βλέμμα του Οδυσσέα	Theo Angelopoulos
9.	Edge of Night	2000	Αυτή η νύχτα μένει	Nikos Panagiotopoulos
10.	The Spring Gathering	1999	Η εαρινή σύναξις των αγροφυλάκων	Dimos Avdeliodis

== See also ==
- Greek Film Critics Association Awards
