= The Man with the Carnation =

1980 film

- Directed by: Nikos Tzimas
- Written by: Nikos Tzimas
- Starring: Foivos Gikopoulos
- Cinematography: Nikos Kavoukidis
- Release date: 23 November 1980
- Running time: 125 minutes
- Country: Greece
- Language: Greek

The Man with the Carnation (Greek: Ο άνθρωπος με το γαρύφαλλο, translit. O anthropos me to garyfallo) is a 1980 Greek drama film written and directed by Nikos Tzimas, dealing with the arrest, trial and execution of the Greek Communist Nikos Belogiannis and his associates in 1951–1952. It was entered into the 12th Moscow International Film Festival where it won a Special Diploma. The film was also selected as the Greek entry for the Best Foreign Language Film at the 54th Academy Awards, but was not accepted as a nominee.

== Cast ==
- Alekos Alexandrakis as Minister Georgios Kartalis
- Angelos Antonopoulos as Tom
- Kostas Kazakos
- Vangelis Kazan as Major Georgios Papadopoulos, member of the court martial and future dictator
- Petros Fyssoun
- Manos Katrakis as Prime Minister Nikolaos Plastiras
- Foivos Gikopoulos as Nikos Belogiannis
- Costas Arzoglou
- Anestis Vlahos as Apostolos

== See also ==
- List of submissions to the 54th Academy Awards for Best Foreign Language Film
- List of Greek submissions for the Academy Award for Best Foreign Language Film
