= Quiet Days in August =

1991 film

- Directed by: Pantelis Voulgaris
- Written by: Pantelis Voulgaris
- Produced by: Pantelis Voulgaris; Dinos Katsouridis
- Starring: Aleka Paizi
- Cinematography: Dinos Katsouridis
- Edited by: Dinos Katsouridis
- Release date: February 1991
- Running time: 108 minutes
- Country: Greece
- Language: Greek

Quiet Days in August (Greek: Ήσυχες μέρες του Αυγούστου, translit. Isyhes meres tou Avgoustou) is a 1991 Greek drama film directed by Pantelis Voulgaris. It was entered into the 41st Berlin International Film Festival.

== Cast ==
- Aleka Paizi as Aleka
- Themis Bazaka as Elli
- Thanasis Veggos as Nikolas
- Chryssoula Diavati as Maria
- Alekos Oudinotis as Lefteris
- Eirini Inglesi as Eirini
- Mirka Kalatzopoulou as Vaso
- Nina Papazaphiropoulou
- Eirini Koumarianou
- Stavros Kalaroglou
- Tonia Stavropoulou
- Aglaia Pappa
