= Oi paranomoi =

1958 film

- Directed by: Nikos Koundouros
- Written by: Nikos Koundouros
- Starring: Titos Vandis
- Cinematography: Giovanni Varriano
- Edited by: Nikos Koundouros
- Release date: 14 May 1958
- Running time: 94 minutes
- Country: Greece
- Language: Greek

Oi paranomoi (Greek: Οι παράνομοι) is a 1958 Greek drama film directed by Nikos Koundouros. It was entered into the 8th Berlin International Film Festival.

== Cast ==
- Titos Vandis - Kosmas
- Petros Fyssoun - Petros Kazakos
- Anestis Vlahos - Argyris
- Nelly Angelidou - Maria
- Giorgos Oikonomou - Bouras
