= Shadow of Fear =

Shadow of Fear or Shadows of Fear may refer to:

== Film and television ==
- Before I Wake (1955 film), also known as Shadow of Fear
- Shadow of Fear (Captain Scarlet and the Mysterons), an episode of Captain Scarlet and the Mysterons
- Shadow of Fear (1964 film)
- Shadow of Fear, a 2004 film directed by Rich Cowan
- Shadows of Fear, a British television series (1970–1973)
- Shadow of Fear, a 1979 television film that aired in two parts on The Wonderful World of Disney
- Shadow of Fear, a fictional item from the episodes of Xiaolin Showdown

== Other ==
- Shadow of Fear (album), a 2020 studio album by Cabaret Voltaire
- Shadow of Fear, a 1994 book by David G. Hartwell

== See also ==
- In the Shadow of Fear, a 1988 Greek drama film directed by Giorgos Karypidis
