= Alekos Oudinotis =

Greek actor

Alekos Oudinotis (Greek: Αλέκος Ουδινότης; 1935 – March 15, 2020) was a Greek film and stage actor.

== Biography ==
Born in 1935 in Athens, Greece, Oudinotis studied at first at Karolos Koun's Greek Art Theatre. At the same time he was a mathematics student at the National and Kapodistrian University of Athens. In late 1974 Oudinotis started his cooperation with the National Theatre of Northern Greece (NTNG), where he performed until 1999. During his time in the National Theatre of Northern Greece, he distinguished himself appearing in plays, such as The Cherry Orchard (1974), The Threepenny Opera (1980), The Rules of the Game (1987), The Caretaker (1992) and Uncle Vanya (1993). During his tenure in NTNG he also worked as a director. He is considered one of the most important actors in the history of NTNG and he also appeared in other theatrical organizations including the National Theatre of Greece.

Moreover, Oudinotis made several appearances on films, including Society Hour Zero (1966), Babylonia (1970), Quiet Days in August (1991) by Pantelis Voulgaris and Angelopoulos' Ulysses' Gaze (1995) and Eternity and a Day (1998).

Oudinotis died on March 15, 2020.

== Selected filmography ==
- Society Hour Zero (1966)
- Babylonia (1970)
- Quiet Days in August (1991)
- Ulysses' Gaze (1995)
- Eternity and a Day (1998)
