= Minas Hatzisavvas =

Greek actor

- Born: 28 January 1947; Athens, Greece
- Died: 30 November 2015 (aged 67); Athens, Greece
- Occupation: Actor
- Years active: 1966–2015

Minas Hatzisavvas (Greek: Μηνάς Χατζησάββας; 28 January 1947 – 30 November 2015) was a Greek actor. He appeared in many films, television series and theatre plays with great success. He initially studied in France and later at the National Theatre of Greece Drama School in Athens. He played his first role in 1965 in Ancient Theatre of Dodona. It was the role of Paris in Rhesus of Euripides.

His debut in cinema was in 1970. From that point on, he appeared in many films and won four film awards as both a leading and supporting actor for the films Ta Paidia tou Kronou, Kleisti Strofi, Lilly's Story and Worlds apart. He was bestowed with two television awards respectively for the television series I Agapi Argise mia Mera and Nyhterino Deltio.

== Filmography ==
=== Movies ===
- Worlds apart (2015)
- Miss Violence (2013)
- J.A.C.E. (2011)
- Unfair World (2011)
- Ap' ta kokala vgalmena (2011)
- Omiros (2005)
- I Triri Nyhta (2003)
- The King (2002)
- Lilly's Story (2002)
- ki avrio mera einai (2001)
- Akrovates tou kipou (2001)
- Mia Mera ti Nyhta (2001)
- Mirupafshim (1997)
- Apontes (1996)
- I zoi enamisy hiliariko (1995)
- Oneirevomai tous filous mou (1993)
- I epohi ton dolofonon (1993)
- Kleisti Strofi (1991)
- Dexiotera tis dexias (1989)
- 1985 Mia toso makryni apousia (1985)
- 1985 Ta paidia tou Kronou (1985)
- To kolie (1985)
- O erotas tou Odyssea (1984)
- Repo (1982)
- Anatoliki perifereia (1979)
- 1922 (1977)
- Ioannis o viaios (1973)
- Omorfes meres (1970)

=== TV series ===
- Amyna Zonis 2007–08
- Dekati Entoli 2004–07
- Oneiro Itan 2003
- Antistrofi Metrisi 2003
- Kokkinos Kyklos 2000–01
- Nyhterino Deltio 1997–98
- I Agapi Argise mia Mera 1997
- Dipli alitheia (TV Series)
- Apon 1995
- Oi agnoimenoi 1993
- Anastasia 1993
- To dekato trito kivotio 1992
- Thysia 1991
- Oi kathreftes 1991
- Kleistoi dromoi 1988

== Awards ==
Awards
| Year | Award | Film | Result |
|---|---|---|---|
| 1985 | Thessaloniki Festival Award for best supporting actor | Ta Paidia tou Kronou | Won |
| 1991 | Thessaloniki Festival Award for best actor | Kleisti Strofi | Won |
| 2002 | Greek State Awards for best supporting actor | Lilly's Story | Won |
| 2015 | Hellenic Academy Award for best supporting actor | Worlds apart | Won |
