= When the sun =

1971 novel by Georges Sari

When The sun...
- Author: Georges Sari
- Original title: Όταν ο ήλιος
- Cover artist: Thanasis Georgiou
- Genre: Novel
- Published: 1971 Patakis Publishers
- Publication place: Greece
- Pages: 152 pp
- ISBN: 978-960-164-496-7

When the sun... (Greek: Όταν ο ήλιος) is a novel by Greek author Georges Sari in 1971. A French translation was published by Esprit Ouvert in 2004, Suisse.

== Plot summary ==
Greece faces the German occupation, a tormenting way of life for Greeks. Zoe grows up witnessing famine and hoping for a better life. She suffers and lives with it. Liberation takes place when Zoe is twenty years old, awaiting a new life. The novel underscores famine, resistance against the oppressor, fear, and optimism for a better future with sensitivity and a restrained sense of tragedy.
