= Yannis Markopoulos =

Greek composer (1939–2023)

- Γιάννης Μαρκόπουλος
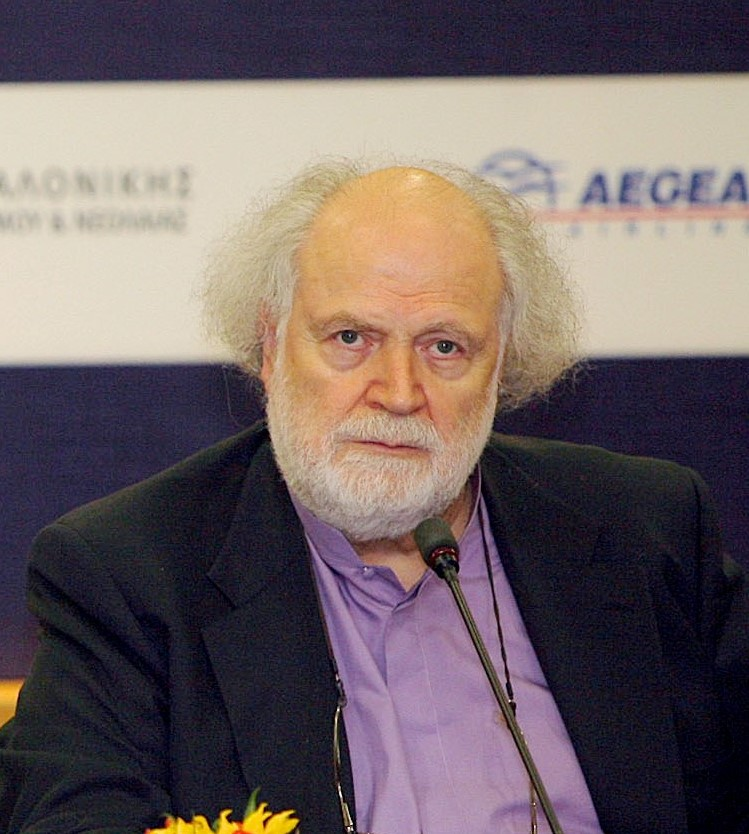
- Markopoulos in 2008
- Born: Ioannis Georgiou Markopoulos; 18 March 1939; Heraklion, Kingdom of Greece
- Died: 10 June 2023 (aged 84); Athens, Greece
- Resting place: Papagou Cemetery, North Athens
- Education: Panteion University, Athens Conservatoire
- Occupation: Composer
- Years active: 1959–2023
- Spouse: Vasiliki Lavida (m. 1980)
- Children: 1

Yannis Markopoulos (Greek: Γιάννης Μαρκόπουλος; 18 March 1939 – 10 June 2023) was a Greek composer.

== Biography ==
=== Early life and education ===
Yannis Markopoulos was born in 1939 in Heraklion, Crete. Born into one of the old families of the island — his father was an attorney and later a Prefect — he spent his childhood in the seaside town of Ierapetra. The Byzantine liturgy heard regularly from the church opposite his family home, Cretan traditional music, with its rapid dances of repeated small motifs, played by local instruments at the town’s weekly festivities, but at the same time the sound of the waves, and the detonation of land-mines in the aftermath of World War II, all these formed part of the acoustic universe of the composer as a child.

He took his first lessons in music theory and the violin at the local conservatory and played the clarinet in the municipal band. Other musical experiences of importance were classical music as well as the music of the wider Eastern Mediterranean and that of nearby Egypt, which he heard either over the radio or from musicians and travellers passing through his hometown. Due to his father’s extensive private library he had the opportunity to deepen his knowledge, beyond school education, in literature, philosophy, history and the arts. He began composing music during his adolescence and two melodies of this time would later become songs that have enjoyed great popularity throughout Greece.

=== Career ===
In 1956 Markopoulos moved to Athens to further his music studies at the Athens Conservatoire under the composer Yiorgos Sklavos and the violin teacher Joseph Bustidui, while studying philosophy and sociology at the Panteion University. While a student he composed music for the theatre, for the cinema and for dance performances. When he was 24 he was awarded the Music Prize of the International Thessaloniki Film Festival for Nikos Koundouros’ film Young Aphrodites and subsequently his works Theseus (dance-drama), Hiroshima (ballet suite) and Three Dance Sketches were performed by avant-garde dance groups.

In 1967 a military dictatorship was imposed in Greece. Markopoulos left for London, where he enriched his knowledge under the English composer Elizabeth Lutyens, while his acquaintance with the composers Jani Christou and Iannis Xenakis played an important rôle in the deepening of his contact with the most pioneering musical figures.

In London he composed the secular cantata Ilios o Protos (Sun the First) on the poetry of Odysseas Elytis (Nobel Prize 1979) and completed the musical ceremony Idou o Nymphios, a work the composer still wished to keep unreleased with the exception of one part, the song Zavara-Katra-Nemia, a vocal composition of Dionysian character, that was released in 1966 and became one of his best known pieces. Also in London he composed Chroismoi (Oracles) for symphony orchestra and the Pyrrichioi Dances A, B, C (the first three of the 24 Dances he completed in 2001) that were performed in 1968 by the London Concertante Orchestra at the Queen Elizabeth Hall. During the same year he was commissioned to write the music for Shakespeare’s The Tempest performed by the National Theatre Company and directed by David Jones.

In 1969 Markopoulos returned to Athens with a musical vision that would not only change the course of music in Greece but would also lend immediate moral support to the general demand for restoration of democracy, the struggle being led primarily by university students and intellectuals. He founded a new and highly distinctive musical ensemble which included Greek local instruments. Thus the piano was combined with the lyre for the first time, while he also added instruments of his own invention, particularly among the percussion, with the intention of enriching the variety of sounds. He then selected young musicians, singers and actors, from both the city and the provinces, and collaborating with painters and poets he presented a series of performances with his musical works Ilios o Protos (Sun the First), Chroniko (Chronicle), Ithagenia (Nativeland), Thitia (Lifetime), Stratis Thalassinos Among the Agapanthi (poetry by Giorgos Seferis, Nobel Prize 1963), Oropedio (Mountain Plain) at the Lydra venue which he named music-studio.

In 1976 he composed the popular liturgy The Free Besieged, based on the poem by Greece’s national poet Dionysios Solomos, that he conducted in the crowded Panathenean Stadium, and which was presented in London in 1979. In 1977 he composed the music for the BBC television series Who Pays the Ferryman? The musical theme was a hit in Britain and gained the composer international renown. Numerous invitations for concerts abroad followed, in Paris, Berlin, Frankfurt, Munich, Amsterdam, Stockholm, Canada, Russia, Australia and the United States. Markopoulos continued composing music for the theatre and for the cinema, collaborating with directors such as Jules Dassin, George Cosmatos, Nikos Koundouros and Spyros Evaggelatos. Through his work Yannis Markopoulos did much to shape the musical landscape of the 1970s.

In 1980 Markopoulos married the singer Vassiliki Lavina, his long-time associate, and in 1981 their daughter Eleni was born. For a period he sought a more private life with his family while preparing for the opening of a new chapter in his music, compositions that would display melodic outbursts sustained by polytonic quality and dazzling rhythms of an inexhaustible exuberance. In 1987 he founded the Palintonos Armonia Orchestra (the name deriving from Heraclitus) with which he would give concerts in Greece and abroad and record many of his works.

The works of this period include the Concerto-Rhapsody for Lyre and Symphony Orchestra, Mitroa for string orchestra, the Healing Symphony, two oratorios, two song cycles, chamber music works, four quartets, two sonatas, and five pieces for violin and piano. In 1994 he composed one of his most important works The Liturgy of Orpheus. There followed Re-Naissance: Crete between Venice and Constantinople, a musical journey in four units that strikes a balance between the opera form and that of the oratorio, and the opera Erotokritos and Areti. In 1999 he composed Shapes in Motion, a piano concerto inspired by Pythagoras and dedicated to his daughter Eleni. Some of his latest works are Evilia Topia (Sunlit Landscapes), fantasy for solo flute; O Nomos tis Thalporis, oratorio-musical spectacle for voices, choir, wind orchestra, ballet and video projection, dedicated to the environment; and Triptych for flute, strings and harp.

== Death ==
Markopoulos died of cancer on 10 June 2023, at the age of 84. His body was laid in state in the chapel of the Metropolitan Cathedral of Athens before his funeral on June 15. He was buried in the Papagou cemetery in Athens.

== Selected discography ==
Year	Album Title	Notes / Description
1963	Theseus (Thiseas)	ballet enriched
1969	Ilios o protos (Sun the First)	for voices, narrator, female choir and chamber orchestra
1970	Chroniko (Chronicle)	for voices, and chamber orchestra
1972	Ta tragoudia tou neou patera (The Songs of the New Father)	
1972	Ithagenia (Nativeland)	for voices, and chamber orchestra
1973	Anexartita	series of unrelated songs
1973	O Stratis Thalassinos anamesa stous Agapanthous - ke alla tragoudia (Stratis Thalassinos Among the Agapanthi - and Other Songs)	for voices, mixed choir and chamber orchestra
1974	Thessalikos kiklos (Thessalian cycle)	popular musical work with theatrical style performances
1974	Metanastes (Emigrant Workers)	songs cycle
1974	Thitia (Lifetime)	work in nine parts, type of one-act opera
1975	Oropedio (Mountain plain)	musical discourse
1977	I eleftheri poliorkimeni (The Free Besieged)	for voices, female narrator, mixed choir and chamber orchestra
1978	Periodia proti (The First Tour)	13 compositions for orchestra
1978	Who Pays the Ferryman?	music for the BBC TV series
1979	Sergiani ston kosmo	songs cycle in three unities
1980	Denekedoupoli	musical performance for children
1980	Οrizontes (Horizons)	songs cycle
1983	Sirines (Sirens)	musical voyage in four seasons in the form of a contemporary oratorio
1988	Music for Domenikos Theotokopoulos (El Greco)	for Renaissance instruments ensemble
1994	The liturgy of Orpheus	for voices, mixed choir, narrator and symphony orchestra
1996	Brightness (Antavgies)	orchestral memories of movements and pictures
1996	Re-naissance, Crete between Venice and Constantinople	musical performance in two acts with four parts
1998	Fili pou fevgoun (Friends Who are Lost)	songs cycle
2001	To tragoudi tou Achillea (The Song of Achilles)	for voices, mixed choir, narrator and symphony orchestra
2003	Erotokritos and Areti	opera in two acts
2004	O tahitatos Louis	for mixed choir, narrator and symphony orchestra
2009	Shapes in motion (Piano Concerto)	for solo piano and symphony orchestra
2009	The liturgy of Orpheus	for voices, mixed choir, narrator and symphony orchestra

=== Songs ===
Year	Song Title	Notes / Alternative Title
1960	"Galazio peristeri"	
1960	"Anistoro ti monaxia"	
1964	"Pou isse afti tin anixi"	
1964	"O pramateftis"	
1964	"Xasteria"	
1964	"Mouragio"	
1964	"I kori (Mavromadilousa)"	
1964	"Karavia"	
1964	"Gremismena spitia"	
1965	"Pera apo ti thalassa"	
1968	"Zavara - Katra - Nemia"	
1972	"Ochi den prepi"	
1973	"I ochthri"	Enemies Entered the City
1975	"I Ellada (Lengo)"	Greece

=== Music for theater and film ===
Year	Film / Theatre Work	English / Alternative Title
1963	Mikres Aphrodites	Young Aphrodite
1965	The Girl with the Ribbon	
1966	Dichasmos	
1967	O thanatos tou Alexandrou	
1968	Epichirisis Apollon	
1970	The Beloved	
1971	Vortex	Das Gesicht der Medusa
1977	Kravgi ginekon	
1984	Ta chronia tis thielas	
1989	Thesmophoriazouses by Aristophanes	
1993	Byron	
1993	Lysistrata by Aristophanes	
