= Ap' ta kokala vgalmena =

- Directed by: Sotiris Goritsas
- Starring: Argyris Xafis
- Release date: 31 March 2011
- Running time: 89 minutes
- Country: Greece
- Language: Greek

Ap' ta kokala vgalmena (Greek: Απ' τα κόκαλα βγαλμένα) is a 2011 Greek comedy film directed by Sotiris Goritsas.

== Plot ==
George Spyratos (Argyris Xafis) is an idealistic doctor who gets frustrated with the reality of Greek hospitals.

== Cast ==
- Argyris Xafis - George Spyratos
- Dimitris Imellos - Pampos Kolokasis
- Anna Koutsaftiki - Dora
- Minas Hatzisavvas - Konstantinos Theotokis
