= Giorgos Katakouzinos =

Greek director and screenwriter

- Born: 1 January 1943; Alexandria, Egypt
- Died: 13 August 2013 (aged 70); Athens, Greece
- Occupation: Film director

Giorgos Katakouzinos (Greek: Γιώργος Κατακουζηνός) was a Greek film director and screenwriter. He was born in Alexandria, Egypt on January 1, 1943, and died in Athens on August 13, 2013.

His most well known work is the 1982 film Angel, one of the earliest Greek films to depict homosexuality. Supposedly finding inspiration in real events, the film dealt with the social stigma surrounding homosexuality in Greek society at the time. It won three awards in Thessaloniki film festival including the award for best picture. His second film, Apousies (Absences), deals with a Greek bourgeois family in the early 20th century and won accolades in Valencia International Film Festival. His third film, Zoe, was also inspired by a real crime that impacted Greek society in the late 1980s. In addition to film, he also found work in Greek television.

== Filmography ==
- Angel (1982)
- Apousies (1987)
- Zoe (1995)
