= Anna Vagena =

Greek actress and politician

Member of the Greek Parliament
- In office 25 January 2015 – 22 April 2023

Personal details
- Born: June 15, 1947 (age 77); Larissa, Greece
- Political party: Syriza
- Occupation: Politician, actress

Anna Vagena (Greek: Άννα Βαγενά; 15 June 1947, Larissa, Greece) is a Greek actress and politician.

== Artistic career ==
She is a graduate of the drama schools of the Karolos Koun Art Theatre and the National Theatre, while she has also studied at the Athens Law School. She has participated in many theatrical productions, including The Glass Menagerie, Assemblywomen, I Triseugeni, Prometheus Bound and Camino Real.

Her most notable cinematic role is the leading role in Pantelis Voulgaris' film The Matchmaking of Anna, which earned her the Best Actress award at the Thessaloniki Film Festival in 1979. Other films she has appeared in include Visibility Zero, The Great Lover, To frourio ton athanaton, Apo pou pane gia ti havouza and The King.

In the 1980s, she participated in the comedic television series To Kanali Tis Vangelitsas on ERT2, the dramatic series "The Journey that Kills" (1992) on ET1, and played roles in various video films. During the 1996–1997 period, she was part of the successful Mega Channel series, Logo timis. In 1999, she co-founded the "Metaxourgeio" Theater along with her husband, Loukianos Kilaidonis. In 2006, she published the book My Thessalian Theater, released by Kedros Publications.

== Political career ==
During her student years, she was actively involved in the Youth of Lambrakis organization. She has been elected as a municipal councilor in the Municipality of Larissa twice.

In the 2009 elections, she was a candidate with the PASOK party in the Athens A constituency. She became a member of parliament on February 12, 2012, following the resignation of Pemi Zouni. She was expelled the next day because she voted against the memorandum and remained an independent until the dissolution of the Parliament.

Subsequently, she collaborated with Syriza and was elected as a member of parliament for Larissa in the elections of January and September 2015. In September 2016, she stated that she would not run again in parliamentary elections. However, in the 2019 parliamentary elections, she ran again with SYRIZA in the Larissa region and was re-elected.
