= Titos Vandis =

Greek actor

- Born: 7 November 1917; Piraeus, Greece
- Died: 23 February 2003 (aged 85); Athens, Greece
- Occupation: Actor
- Years active: 1953–2000

Titos Vandis (Greek: Τίτος Βανδής; 7 November 1917 – 23 February 2003) was a Greek actor.

== Biography ==
Vandis graduated from the drama school of the National Theatre in 1936. The first part of his career in Greece lasted up to 1965. In 1962, he won the Best Actor award for the film Poliorkia at the Thessaloniki International Film Festival. Vandis left Greece when a dictatorship took power and lived in the United States for 18 years. He returned to Greece in 1983 and continued his career up to 1995.

Vandis appeared in over 250 plays before making his Broadway debut in the Tony-nominated musical On A Clear Day You Can See Forever (1965). He originated the role of Themistocles Kriakos, a Greek shipping magnate who believed in reincarnation and planned to leave his fortune to his future self. Boston Globe critic Kevin Kelly wrote that Vandis played the role with "marvellous finesse" and that the character was "rather like Zorba as a businessman with $4 million."

Vandis was in the original Broadway cast and led the title song in Illya Darling (1967), a musical based on the film Never on Sunday (1960). The title character Illya was a carefree Greek prostitute. Newsday critic George Oppenheimer wrote, "Major credit goes to Titos Vandis for his playing of Illya's oldest client, who sings and dances as rousingly as the youngsters ..." Vandis reprised his role in a Westbury Music Fair production in 1968. Newsday critic Murry Frymer wrote that Vandis "... is delightfully authentic. In fact, he's better than that. Vandis has been in both the film, Never on Sunday and the Broadway production of Illya Darling and he's not tired of it at all. His portrayal was fresh and kept bringing the affair back to the colorful gayety that bubbled through the motion picture."

In 1970 Vandis joined the cast of Man of La Mancha as Sancho Panza at the Martin Beck Theater. He also played the title role in the musical Zorba at the Paper Mill Playhouse in Millburn, NJ. Critic W. C. Flahault wrote, "His portrayal of the Greek vagabond with an eye for the girls has an earthiness which brings reality to the role."

In 1972 Vandis played an uneducated coal miner on Ironside who sought Ironside's help in discovering the murderer of his daughter. He admitted, "that drama was easier for him than the musical stage." Vandis said, "I suppose this part can be considered a change of pace for me, but as an actor, I find myself considering each role I play as a separate entity ... During the days of my early training, I often played old men; in fact, I relished the opportunities. Today, of course, as I grow older, I wish the positions were reversed!"

In that same year, he appeared in the Woody Allen film Everything You Always Wanted to Know About Sex* (*But Were Afraid to Ask) as Milos Stavros, an Armenian shepherd who was in love with a sheep. In The Exorcist (1973), he played the uncle of protagonist Father Damien Karras. Vandis wore a hat in one shot that obscured his face, as director William Friedkin felt that Vandis's face would be connected with his previous role as Milos.

Vandis had a recurring role in the detective series Baretta (1975–1978), having appeared in four episodes, he guest- starred alongside Hulk Hogan in The A-Team episode "Body Slam" (1985–1986 season). His other TV appearances have included The Flying Nun, Trapper John, M.D., M*A*S*H, The Odd Couple, Kojak, Barney Miller, Wonder Woman, Newhart, and The Mary Tyler Moore Show.

He taught in the Santa Monica College in the US and co- founded, with G.Theodosiadis, the Drama School of Athens in Greece.

Vandis married six times and had one daughter with his second wife. He was married to his sixth wife, from 1984 up to his death in 2003.

== Selected filmography ==
- To kleidi tis eftyhias (1953) - Nikolas
- Gynaikes dihos antres (1954) - Loukas
- To paidi tou dromou (1957) - Giorgis
- Oi paranomoi (1958) - Kosmas
- Miden pente (1958)
- Agnes psyhes (1959)
- Astero (1959) - Mitros Pithokoukouras
- Never on Sunday (1960) - Jorgo
- To potami (1960)
- Egklima sta paraskinia (1960) - Inspector Bekas
- Pothoi sta stahya (1960) - Giannis Tsakas
- To rantevou tis Kyriakis (1960)
- Poliorkia (1962) - Stelios
- I katara tis mannas (1962) - Vagias
- It Happened in Athens (1962) - Father Loues
- Island of Love (1963) - Father Anaxagoras
- Topkapi (1964) - Harback
- O teleftaios peirasmos (1964) - Dr. Kalomoiris
- I Kypros stis floges (1964)
- Apagogi (1964) - Lieutenant Stergiou
- Ohi, ... kyrie Johnson (1965)
- What's So Bad About Feeling Good? (1968) - Captain Narcopolis (uncredited)
- Stiletto (1969) - Tonio
- Everything You Always Wanted to Know About Sex* (*But Were Afraid to Ask) (1972) - Milos
- Genesis II (1973) - Yuloff
- The Exorcist (1973) - John, Karras's uncle
- Zandy's Bride (1974) - Demas (uncredited)
- Newman's Law (1974) - Grainie
- Harrad Summer (1974) - Mr. Kolasukas
- Black Samson (1974) - Giuseppe "Joe" Nappa
- Once Upon a Scoundrel (1974) - Dr. Fernandez
- Smile (1975) - Emile
- Satan's Triangle (1975) - Salao
- Gus (1976) - Papa Petrovic
- Alex & the Gypsy (1976) - Treska
- The Other Side of Midnight (1977) - President of the Council
- A Piece of the Action (1977) - Bruno
- Oh, God! (1977) - Greek Bishop Markos
- The Betsy (1978) - Angelo Luigi Perino
- The President's Mistress (1978) - Anatoly
- A Perfect Couple (1979) - Panos Theodopoulos
- The Miracle Worker (1979) - Anagnos
- O falakros mathitis (1979) - Vesuvius Karatampanos
- Hart to Hart (1981) - Xenophon Papadopoulos
- National Lampoon's Movie Madness (1982) -Nixos Naxos ("Success Wanters")
- Young Doctors in Love (1982) - Sal Bonafetti
- Prosohi, kindynos! (1983) - Sideris
- Ta hronia tis thyellas (1984) - Priest
- Fletch Lives (1989) - Uncle Kakakis
- To athoo soma (1997)
