= Murder Backstage =

- Directed by: Dinos Katsouridis
- Written by: Giannis Maris
- Starring: Alekos Alexandrakis; Maro Kontou; Hristos Tsaganeas; Titos Vandis; Aliki Georgouli; Georges Sarri; Dimos Starenios
- Music by: Mimis Plessas
- Distributed by: Damaskinos-Mihailidis S.A.
- Release date: September 1960
- Running time: 90 minutes
- Country: Greece
- Language: Greek

Murder Backstage (Greek: Έγκλημα στα παρασκήνια) is a 1960 Greek theatrical film noir film starring Alekos Alexandrakis, Maro Kontou, Hristos Tsaganeas, Titos Vandias, Aliki Georgouli, Georges Sarri and Dimos Starenios. The writer was the famous police novelist Giannis Maris.

== Plot ==
A well known actress of the theatre is assassinated and the simultaneously one of these actors of the theatre escapes. The police, along with the journalists of a newspaper company ask the edge of the filament for located the assassin. The action occurs during the occupation period of World War II.

== Cast ==
- Alekos Alexandrakis as Journalist Makris (Δημοσιογράφος Μακρής)
- Titos Vandis as Officer Bekas (Αστυνόμος Μπέκας)
- Maro Kontou as Elena Pavlidi (Έλενα Παυλίδη)
- Aliki Georgouli as Mary Lambrinou (Μαίρη Λαμπρινού)
- Georges Sarri as Thaleia Halkia (Θάλεια Χαλκιά)
- Christos Tsaganeas as Pavlos Stefanou (Παύλος Στεφάνου)
- Efi Mella as Roza Delli (Ρόζα Δελλή)
- Thanassis Mylonas as Haris Apostolidis (Χάρης Αποστολίδης)
- Dimos Starenios as Stavros
- Lavrentis Dianellos as barman
- Sapfo Notara as cleaning lady
- Vasos Andrianos
- Dimitris Nikoalidis
- Giorgos Damassiotis as doorman
- Giorgos Belos
- Gkikas Biniaris
- Velisarios Kontogiannis

== Awards ==
The movie was presented with the presentation of an American film noir that made it one of the greatest Greek movies of the time, it was awarded twice at the first Thessaloniki Film Festival in 1960 see 1960 Thessaloniki Film Festival.

- Photographer: Aristeidis Karydis-Fuchs
- Second female role: Georges Sarri
