= Stone Years =

- Directed by: Pantelis Voulgaris
- Written by: Pantelis Voulgaris
- Produced by: Pantelis Voulgaris
- Starring: Themis Bazaka; Dimitris Kataleifos
- Cinematography: Giorgos Arvanitis
- Edited by: Andreas Andreadakis
- Music by: Stamatis Spanoudakis
- Production company: Greek Film Centre/ERT
- Release date: 1985
- Running time: 142 minutes
- Country: Greece
- Language: Greek

Stone Years (Greek: Πέτρινα Χρόνια, romanized: Petrina hronia) is a 1985 Greek drama film written and directed by Pantelis Voulgaris. The film, inspired by true events, follows the life of a communist couple, Eleni and Babis, from 1954 to the end of the Greek junta in 1974.

== Plot ==
In 1954 in Thessaly, two young people, Eleni, 18, and Babis, 22, are in love. They print and distribute leaflets for the communist party, which has been banned for years. Eleni comes from a family with a communist tradition: her father and her brothers were killed in World War II by the Nazis or their collaborators during the civil war. Her two sisters are in exile in the Eastern Bloc countries.

An informant reveals the couple. Babis is arrested, but Eleni manages to escape with the help of her cousin, who recognizes her on the train, but does not arrest her. She then lives for twelve years in hiding in Athens, where she continues to print leaflets. In these twelve years, she manages to see her mother only once, as does Babis, when she takes the same ship that transports him from a prison in Crete to a prison in Aegina.

Babis is released in 1966. The two lovers meet again and spend a few months together, participating in the major political demonstrations of the time. Eleni is arrested, as she was still considered a wanted person. During her trial, she is presented as a dangerous terrorist, an enemy of the state. She is sentenced to a heavy prison sentence. She realizes that she is pregnant and eventually gives birth in prison. Babis is arrested in the early days of the Junta. In prison, the guards treat the prisoners as old friends with whom they meet again. Babis is imprisoned in the same prison as Eleni and their son. They meet sometimes in the central square. They communicate with each other using the reflection of the sun on a broken piece of mirror. The dictatorship, in the name of family values, forces them to get married. As no one was allowed to enter the prison, the baby was the best man. The two of them separate immediately after the ceremony.

With the Metapolitefsi, when they are now free and can now live together, Eleni realizes that they have become estranged from Babis and have nothing to say.

== Cast ==
- Themis Bazaka as Eleni Ifanti
- Dimitris Kataleifos as Babis Kiourtzis
- Maria Martika as Eftychia Ifanti
- Irini Inglesi as Cleo
- Nikos Birbilis as the prison warden
- Ilias Katevas as Michalis
- Thanos Grammenos as a political prisoner
- Kostas Koutsomichos as a child of prisoners

== Reception ==
At the 26th Thessaloniki Film Festival, the film won the following awards: the Best Film Award, the Best Actress Award for Themis Bazaka, and the Directing Award for Pantelis Voulgaris. The film also won the Best Film Award from the Panhellenic Union of Film Critics in 1985. At the Ministry of Culture and Sports' state quality awards, the film won the following awards: the Award for Best Actress, the Award for Music and the Distinction for film quality Award.

The film was also distinguished at festivals abroad. Themis Bazaka received a special mention for her performance at the Venice International Film Festival. At the Valencia Film Festival in 1985, the film won the awards for Best Actress and Music.

=== Analysis ===
Eleni and Babis' ideology is neither developed nor clearly explained. They do not participate in the major debates of the time about Stalinism or the Gulag. Ultimately, their commitment seems more tied to their family history and circumstances than to a genuine communist faith.

The film is, according to Dan Georgakas in 2006, very Manichaean. During her trial, Eleni is presented by the authorities as a dangerous terrorist, but nothing in the film shows her before that justifies this. The informants are portrayed as vile people. The population as a whole is depicted as spineless, unprotesting during the arrests. At the same time, no reason is given for the support that the population gave to the current regimes.

The person on whose life the protagonist Eleni was based, Eleni Voulgari-Golema, passed away at the age of 87 on May 31, 2022.
