= Crystal Nights =

1992 film

- Directed by: Tonia Marketaki
- Written by: Tonia Marketaki; Malvina Karali
- Starring: François Delaive
- Cinematography: Stavros Hassapis
- Edited by: Yanna Spyropoulou
- Release date: November 1992
- Running time: 138 minutes
- Country: Greece
- Language: Greek

Crystal Nights (Greek: Κρυστάλλινες νύχτες Krystallines nychtes) is a 1992 Greek drama film directed by Tonia Marketaki. It was screened in the Un Certain Regard section at the 1992 Cannes Film Festival.

== Cast ==
- François Delaive as Albert
- Michele Valley as Isabella
- Tania Tripi as Anna
- Katerina Baka
- Spiros Bibilas
- Yorgos Charalabidis
- Kelly Ioakeimidou
- Kelly Karmiri
- Faidon Kastris
- Dimitris Katsimanis
- Alexandros Koliopoulos
- Frosso Litra
- Giorgos Mihailidis
- Ovidiu Iuliu Moldovan
- Tassos Palatzidis
- Manos Vakousis
- Melina Vamvaka
- Manos Pantelidis as The Snitch (uncredited)
