= Glory Sky =

- Directed by: Takis Kanellopoulos
- Written by: Takis Kanellopoulos; Giorgos Kitsopoulos
- Produced by: Vasileia Drakaki
- Starring: Aimilia Pitta
- Cinematography: Grigoris Danalis; Giovanni Varriano
- Edited by: Takis Kanellopoulos
- Release date: 1962
- Running time: 87 minutes
- Country: Greece
- Language: Greek

Glory Sky (Greek: Ouranos) is a 1962 Greek war film directed by Takis Kanellopoulos. It was entered into the 1963 Cannes Film Festival.

== Cast ==
- Aimilia Pitta - Sofia
- Phaedon Georgitsis - Stratos
- Takis Emmanuel - Giagos
- Eleni Zafeiriou
- Niki Triantafillidi - Anthoula
- Lambrini Dimitriadou
- Giorgos Fourniadis
- Kostas Karagiorgis
- Christoforos Malamas
- Costas Messaris - (as Kostas Angelou)
- Lazos Terzas
- Stavros Tornes
- Nikos Tsachiridis
