= Angel (1982 Greek film) =

1982 film

- Theatrical poster for Angel
- Directed by: Giorgos Katakouzinos
- Written by: Giorgos Katakouzinos
- Produced by: Giorgos Katakouzinos
- Starring: Michalis Maniatis; Dionysis Xanthos
- Cinematography: Tassos Alexakis
- Music by: Stamatis Spanoudakis
- Release date: 15 October 1982
- Running time: 126 minutes
- Country: Greece
- Language: Greek

Angel (Greek: Άγγελος, translit. Angelos) is a 1982 Greek drama film directed by Giorgos Katakouzinos. The film was selected as the Greek entry for the Best Foreign Language Film at the 55th Academy Awards, but was not accepted as a nominee.

== Plot ==
A young gay man in Athens, Angelos, keeps his sexual identity a secret from his family. He falls hard for a rough sailor, Mihalis, and moves in with him. Mihalis convinces Angelos to dress in drag and work a corner with other transvestites. With the money, Mihalis buys a fancy motorcycle and hangs out in bars.

By day, Angelos is in the army; at night, he is a prostitute. At Christmas, he visits his grandmother and learns that both she and his mother were also prostitutes. A crisis ensues when neighborhood men beat up Angelos: his family is informed, the army discharges him, and his father goes crazy. Angelos wants to quit prostituting himself, but Mihalis shows no empathy, becomes abusive and threatens to leave if Angelos doesn't continue prostituting. This eventually pushes Angelos to a breaking point.

== Cast ==
- Michalis Maniatis as Angelos
- Dionysis Xanthos as Mihalis
- Katerina Helmy as Angelos' Mother
- Vasilis Tsaglos as Angelos' Father
- Giorgos Bartis as Angelos' Ex-boyfriend
- Maria Alkeou as Angelos' Grandmother

== See also ==
- List of submissions to the 55th Academy Awards for Best Foreign Language Film
- List of Greek submissions for the Academy Award for Best Foreign Language Film
