= John the Violent =

- Directed by: Tonia Marketaki
- Written by: Tonia Marketaki
- Produced by: Tonia Marketaki
- Starring: Manolis Logiadis, Mika Flora, Vangelis Kazan
- Edited by: Giorgos Korras
- Release date: September 29, 1973
- Running time: 180 minutes
- Country: Greece
- Language: Greek

John the Violent (Greek: Ιωάννης ο Βίαιος, Ioannis o Viaios) is a 1973 black and white Greek film starring Manolis Logiadis in his role as Ioannis Zachos, a young psychopath who murders a woman in Athens. The award-winning film was directed by Tonia Marketaki. The film impressed the audience at the Thessaloniki film festival upon its release in 1973 where it was awarded three of the top prizes. The film is based on an actual murder which happened in Athens in the 1960s and created a media sensation at the time.

== Plot ==
Ioannis Zachos is a psychopath who fantasises about killing beautiful women as a means to validate his manhood and to feel a sense of empowerment. He stalks the empty streets of Athens at night looking for victims. In one of those outings he enters a small sidestreet and at around midnight he sees a young woman, Eleni Chalkia, whom he attacks stabbing her to death. After the murder he disappears into the darkness.

A murder investigation eventually leads to his arrest. During interrogation he readily confesses his crime to the police to their great relief, since their investigation had come under fire for its perceived faults. In the ensuing trial, the psychopath freely admits his guilt but during his testimony he falls into contradictions. It becomes apparent that the murderer bases his testimony on reports he reads from the newspapers which cover his criminal trial.

Zachos may be a deviant psychopath but he possesses eloquence, grace, charisma and above-average intelligence which make him attractive to the trial audience, the judges, the press and the psychiatrists. He soon becomes a "social icon" through the everyday reports of the press.

He is articulate in describing his violent tendencies in the context of an indifferent, cold society and explains that he uses violence as a means to achieve catharsis. He freely admits that the murder was senseless and served no purpose but he explains that he feels pressured and trapped within society and that he committed the murder to obtain a sense of relief.

He is a hedonist and he feels pleasure for being guilty and then pleasure for admitting his guilt, an act which he considers his way of presenting his own "truth" and being honest. Finally, as soon as society accepts his guilt, he feels the pleasure of atonement.

His appeal, along with his articulate and seemingly sincere explanations of his motives, deeply resonated with the youth of the era. By presenting himself as a "trapped soul" desperate to escape societal pressures, he mirrored their own hidden frustrations and desires, ultimately captivating a generation.

The relatives of the victim do not appear eager to defend her memory as they try to play-up their role at the trial and vie for the attention of the mass media. The murderer is found not guilty by reason of insanity. He is sentenced to life incarceration in a psychiatric hospital. The film in the end leaves an open question as to who is the real guilty party, the individual or society. The plot is based on the actual murder case of Maria Bavea (Greek: Μαρία Μπαβέα) in 1963.

== Reception ==
Angelos Rouvas in his book Greek Cinema mentions that Tonia Marketaki's film explores the underlying reasons which cause alienated and lonely people living in large cities to become psychologically disturbed individuals who can then commit violent crimes.

Film critic Achilleas Kyriakides compares Marketaki's techniques in the film, to Richard Brooks's direction of In Cold Blood. Kyriakides describes how Marketaki's lens wonders at the beginning of the film like a "ghost in the streets of an ugly city, wondering among the apartments of a rudderless society" and contrasts it to the claustrophobic and frantic action of the second part, where the lens moves in flashbacks during the reconstruction of the crime scene and leads the audience from one place to another; moving from the jail cell, to the court, to the murder scene and the psychiatric wards.

He comments that in Marketaki's film the truths are all over the place, but that the Truth is absent and compares it to Akira Kurosawa's Rashomon. According to Kyriakides, Marketaki's technique is to present the elements of her film like a puzzle, where the pieces she supplies fit in a larger mosaic but comments that the picture of the mosaic is never revealed in its entirety. The film ends abruptly, as if it puts an end to its own life, in a final, violent act.

I Avgi quotes film critic Aglaia Mitropoulou who comments that Marketaki does not use the crime as a reason to create a crime drama but instead she analyses and explores the whole social environment and the reasons behind the crime using the same type of methodology that Norman Mailer and Jean-Pierre Jeunet follow in their films. I Avgi also comments that the film explores the theatrical aspects behind justice and its law processes and the psychology of the absurd as applied to the Greek society of the 1960s.

== Cast ==
- Manolis Logiadis as Ioannis Zachos
- Mika Flora as Eleni Chalkia
- Vangelis Kazan as Captain Giannopoulos
- Malaina Anousaki as Mrs. Chalikia
- Costas Arzoglou as Christos Christoforidis
- Dimitris Bikiropoulos
- Takis Doukatos (as T. Doukakos)
- Nikos Glavas
- Minas Hatzisavvas as Dr. Pannopoulos
- Costas Messaris
- Mary Metaxa as grandmother
- Yorgos Partsalakis
- Lida Protopsalti
- Nikitas Tsakiroglou
- Kostas Tsakonas
- Thanassis Valtinos
- Zozo Zarpa as Kontantina Stavrianou
- Kostas Ziogas

== Awards ==
The film was awarded the following prizes at the 14th Thessaloniki International Film Festival in 1973:

- Direction
- Plot
- Male leading role
- Honourable distinction

== Release ==
The film was released in Greece in September 1973.
