= Anestis Vlahos =

Greek actor (1934–2021)

- Born: 7 February 1934
- Died: 23 August 2021 (aged 87)

Anestis Vlahos (Greece, 7 February 1934 – 23 August 2021) was a Greek actor and politician.

Vlahos died at the age of 87, on 23 August 2021.

== Selected filmography ==
- A Girl in Black
- Young Aphrodites
- The Man with the Carnation
