= Roussos A. Koundouros =

Greek lawyer and politician

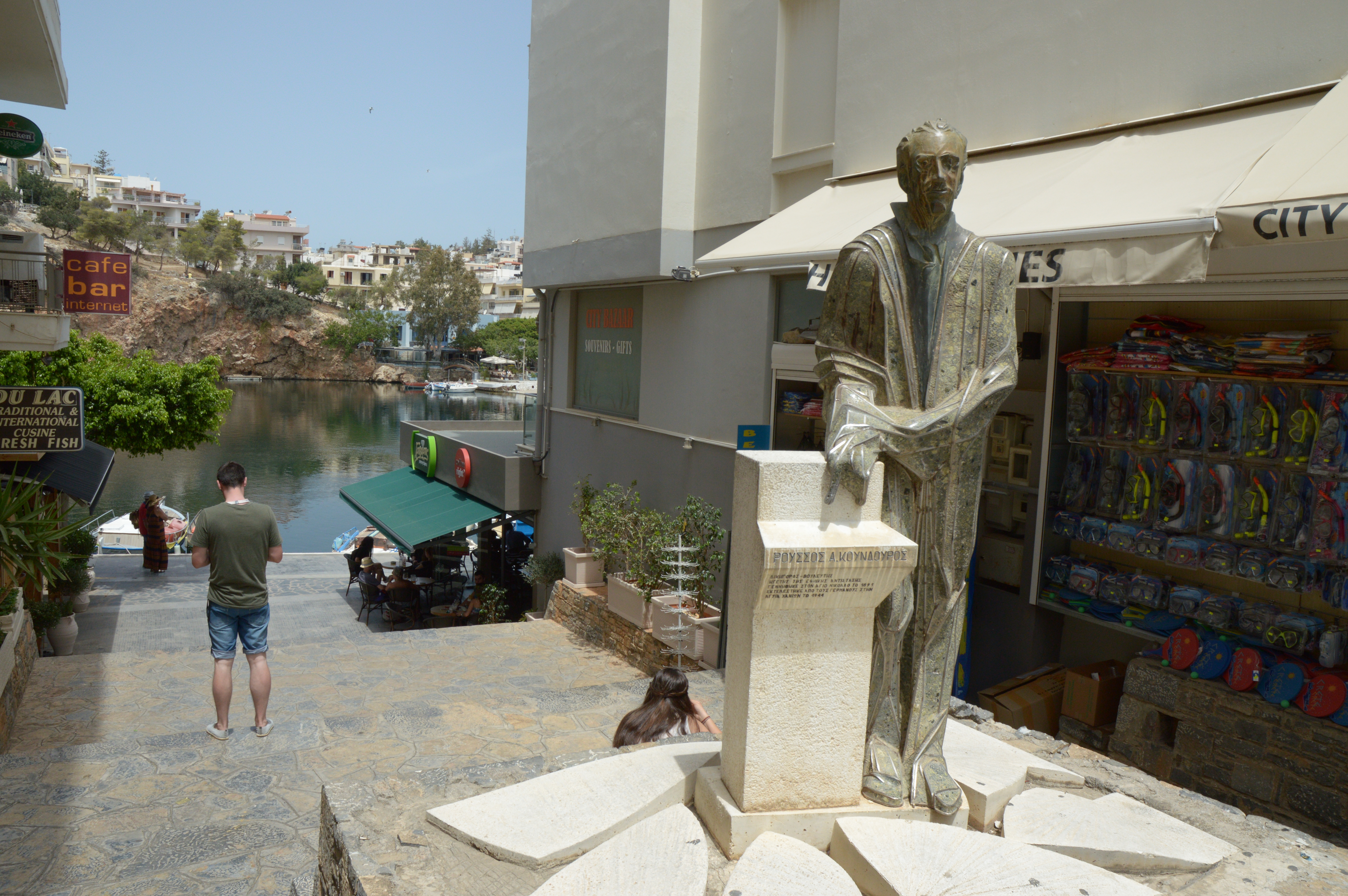

Roussos A. Koundouros (Greek: Ρούσος Ανδρέα Κούνδουρος; Agios Nikolaos, 1891 – October 29, 1944) was a Greek lawyer and politician who was executed by the Germans for his involvement in the Cretan Resistance.
