= Young Aphrodites =

- Directed by: Nikos Koundouros
- Written by: Kostas Sfikas; Vassilis Vassilikos
- Produced by: Minos films
- Starring: Kleopatra Rota; Eleni Prokopiou; Takis Emmanouel; Vaggelis Ioannidis; Zannino; Anestis Vlahos; Kostas Papakonstantinou; Vasilis Kailas
- Music by: Giannis Markopoulos
- Production companies: Anzervos; Minos Films
- Release date: September 22, 1963
- Running time: 88 minutes
- Country: Greece
- Language: Greek

Young Aphrodites (Greek: Μικρές Αφροδίτες, translit. Mikres Afrodites) is a drama film of 1963 directed by Nikos Koundouros based on a script of Vassilis Vassilikos.

== Plot ==
In 200 BC, a nomadic group of shepherds, in search of new pastures, leaves the mountains to settle close to a fishing village. The women of the village hide and the only ones to venture out are Arta, a fisherman's wife, and a twelve-year-old girl, Chloe.

Skymnos, a young shepherd, approaches Chloe who walks semi-naked around the rocks and the beach. Among the two children begins a tantalising game; as a sign of his affection, Skymnos catches a pelican for Chloe and mounts it on a gantry. Meanwhile, Arta initially rejects the older shepherd Tsakalos, but finally succumbs and the couple meet in a cave where Skymnos and Chloe watch them make love through a crack in the rock.

When the shepherds decide to leave, Arta leaves with them, accompanying Tsakalos, but Skymnos refuses to go. Lykas, a mute teenage shepherd, finds Chloe and rapes her. At first Chloe struggles, but then apparently gives in to the sensations her first sexual experience is exposing her to. When Skymnos witnesses this scene, he unties the dead pelican, throws its corpse into the sea and allows himself to be swept away.

== Production ==
Many of the actors were actually shepherds.

The film is based on the romance of Daphnis and Chloe.

Kleopatra Rota recalled that the rape scene was shot under the absolute guidance of the director. "I didn't get a clue. Lykas [Kostas Papakonstantinou] told me, 'move your legs slower, slower' and that was it. The rest was taken care of by the camera and the editing. I realized at sixteen that it was a rape scene."

== Awards ==
- Silver Bear for Best Director (Berlin Film Festival) - Nikos Koundouros
- International Federation of Film Critics (FIPRESCI) Prize
- Thessaloniki Film Festival Award for Best Film and Best Director - Nikos Koundouros
