= 1922 (1978 film) =

1978 film

- Directed by: Nikos Koundouros
- Written by: Nikos Koundouros; Stratis Karras
- Based on: Number 31328; 1924 novel by Elias Venezis
- Starring: Antigoni Amanitou; Zaharias Rohas
- Cinematography: Nikos Kavoukidis
- Release date: 3 October 1978 (TFF)
- Running time: 135 minutes
- Country: Greece
- Language: Greek

1922 is a 1978 Greek drama film directed by Nikos Koundouros about the Greek genocide based on the autobiography of Greek novelist Elias Venezis, Number 31328. The film is set in and around Smyrna (Izmir) at the time the Turkish army entered the city in 1922, and follows the suffering of ethnic Greeks held as prisoners.

== Cast ==
- Antigoni Amanitou - Loukia
- Zaharias Rohas - Ilias
- Nikos Kapios
- Vasilis Kolovos
- Katerina Gogou - actress
- Minas Hatzisavvas
- Olga Tournaki - Ilias's mother
