= Giorgos Ninios =

Greek actor

Giorgos Ninios (Greek: Γιώργος Νινιός; born 1959, Athens) is a Greek television, film and stage actor kai director with an extensive filmography, born 1959 in Athens Greece.

He distinguished himself in the Thessaloniki Film Festival for Best Supporting Actor in 1989, 1990 and 1991.
