= Takis Kanellopoulos =

Greek film director

- Born: 26 October 1933; Thessaloniki, Greece
- Died: 21 September 1990 (aged 56); Thessaloniki, Greece
- Occupations: Film director Screenwriter
- Years active: 1960–1980

Takis Kanellopoulos (Greek: Τάκης Κανελλόπουλος; 26 October 1933 – 21 September 1990) was a Greek film director and screenwriter. He directed ten films between 1960 and 1980.

== Filmography ==
- Sonia (1980)
- Romantiko simeioma (1978)
- To hroniko mias Kyriakis (1975)
- I teleftaia anoixi (1972)
- Kastoria (1969)
- Parenthesi (1968)
- Ekdromi (1966)
- Ouranos (1962)
- Thasos (1961)
- Makedonikos gamos (1960)
