= In the Shadow of Fear =

1988 film

- Directed by: Giorgos Karypidis
- Written by: Giorgos Karypidis
- Starring: Giorgos Konstas
- Release date: 10 October 1988
- Running time: 92 minutes
- Country: Greece
- Language: Greek

In the Shadow of Fear (Greek: Στη Σκιά του Φόβου Sti skia tou fovou) is a 1988 Greek drama film directed by Giorgos Karypidis. The film was selected as the Greek entry for the Best Foreign Language Film at the 61st Academy Awards, but was not accepted as a nominee.

== Cast ==
- Giorgos Konstas

== See also ==
- List of submissions to the 61st Academy Awards for Best Foreign Language Film
- List of Greek submissions for the Academy Award for Best Foreign Language Film
