= The Reconstruction (film) =

1970 Greek film by Theo Angelopoulos

Reconstitution
- Theatrical release poster
- Αναπαράσταση
- Directed by: Theo Angelopoulos
- Written by: Theo Angelopoulos; Stratis Karras; Thanassis Valtinos
- Produced by: Giorgis Samiotis
- Starring: Toula Stathopoulou; Yannis Totsikas; Thanos Grammenos; Petros Hoedas; Mihalis Fotopoulos; Yannis Balaskas; Nicos Alevras; Alekos Alexiou; Theo Angelopoulos; Christos Paliyannopoulos; Telis Samandas; Panos Papadopoulos; Adonis Lykouresis; Giorgos Arvanitis; Mersoula Kapsali
- Cinematography: Giorgos Arvanitis
- Edited by: Takis Davlopoulos
- Release date: 24 September 1970 (Thessaloniki Festival of Greek Cinema)
- Running time: 100 minutes
- Country: Greece
- Language: Greek
- Budget: 350,000 drachmas

The Reconstruction (Greek: Αναπαράσταση, romanized: Anaparastasi) is a 1970 Greek dramatic black and white independent art film directed by Theo Angelopoulos. It is the director's first feature film. While based on true events, it transcends them to recall the ancient myths of the Atrides and Clytemnestra.

In 1986, the Greek Film Critics Association named it the third-best Greek film in history.

== Synopsis ==
In a remote village in Epirus, a woman murders her husband, who had just returned from Germany, where he had gone to work, with the help of her lover. The crime is never shown on screen. The main characters (judge, policemen, journalists) try to reconstruct and understand a news item that escapes them.

== Technical information ==
- Title: Αναπαράσταση (tr. Anaparastasi)
- Directed by: Theo Angelopoulos
- Script: Theo Angelopoulos, Stratis Karras, and, Thanassis Valtinos
- Cinematography: Giorgos Arvanitis
- Art Department: Mikes Karapiperis
- Sound: Thanassis Arvanitis
- Editing: Takis Davlopoulos
- Production Manager: Christos Papayannopoulos
- Country of origin: Greece
- Format: Black and white – Mono – 35 mm
- Genre: Drama
- Duration: 100 Minutes
- Release date: 24 September 1970 (Thessaloniki Festival of Greek Cinema)

== Cast ==
- Toula Stathopoulou: Eleni Gousis
- Yannis Totsikas: Ranger Hristos Gikas
- Thanos Grammenos: Eleni's Brother
- Petros Hoedas: Investigator
- Mihalis Fotopoulos: Eleni's Husband Kostas Gousis
- Yannis Balaskas: Police Officer
- Nicos Alevras: Investigator's Assistant
- Alekos Alexiou: Police Officer
- Theo Angelopoulos, Christos Paliyannopoulos, Telis Samandas, Panos Papadopoulos, Adonis Lykouresis, Giorgos Arvanitis, Mersoula Kapsali: Journalists

== Awards ==
It was awarded Best Film, Best Director, Best Supporting Actress and Best Cinematography at the Thessaloniki Festival of Greek Cinema in 1970, as well as Best Foreign Film at the Hyères Festival, International Federation of Film Critics Special Mention at the 21st Berlin International Film Festival and Prix Georges-Sadoul in 1971.

== Bibliography ==
- Michel Demopoulos, directeur de publication, Le Cinéma grec [Greek Cinema], Paris, Centre Georges Pompidou, collection «cinéma/pluriel,» 1995, 263 pages, ISBN 2858508135. (in French)
- Vrasidas Karalis, A History of Greek Cinema, New York, New York and London, Continuum International Publishing Group, 2012, 344 pages, ISBN 978-1-4411-9447-3.
- Sylvie Rollet, directeur de publication (préface: Theo Angelopoulos), Théorème 9: Théo Angelopoulos au fil du temps [Theo Angelopoulos over the Course of Time], Paris, Presses Sorbonne Nouvelle, 2007, 189 pages, ISBN 978-2-87854-372-8. (in French)
- Stéphane Sawas, «Grèce (1967–1974) – Les écrans grecs sous la dictature des colonels: la grande rupture,» [Greece (1967–1974) – Greek Screens Under the Dictatorship of the Colonels: The Great Break] dans Raphaël Muller et Thomas Wieder, directeurs de publication, Cinéma et régimes autoritaires au xxe siècle: Écrans sous influence [Cinema and Authoritarian Regimes in the Twentieth Century: Screens Under Influence], Paris, Éditions École Normale Supérieure rue d'Ulm et Presses Universitaires de France, collection «Les rencontres de Normale Sup',» 2008, 285 pages, ISBN 978-2-13-055749-4. (in French)
- Stéphane Sawas, «Entre amnésie collective et mémoire retrouvée: La guerre civile grecque au cinéma,» [Between Collective Amnesia and Rediscovered Memory: The Greek Civil War in Cinema] dans Carola Hähnel-Mesnard, Marie Liénard-Yeterian, et Cristina Marinas, directeurs de publication, Culture et mémoire: Représentations contemporaines de la mémoire dans les espaces mémoriels, les arts du visuel, la littérature et le théâtre [Culture and Memory: Contemporary Representations of Memory in Memorial Spaces, Visual Arts, Literature and Theater], Paris, Éditions de l'École Polytechnique et Éditions Ellipses, 2008, 534 pages, ISBN 978-2-7302-1492-6. (in French)
- Γιάννης Σολδάτος [Yannis Soldatos], Ιστορία του ελληνικού κινηματογράφου [History of Greek Cinema, tr. Istoría tou ellinikoú kinimatográfou], Β' Τόμος: 1967–1990, Αθήνα, Αιγόκερως, 2002, 383 σελίδες, ISBN 960-322-124-4. (in Greek)
