= Petros Fyssoun =

Greek actor

- Born: 5 October 1933; Agrinio, Greece
- Died: 5 December 2016 (aged 83); Athens, Greece
- Occupation: Actor
- Spouse: Maud Hansson (m. 1965)
- Awards: Leading Male Actor in the 1963 and 1964 Greek Film Festivals; Leading Male Actor at the 1975 Ithaca Film Festival

Petros Fyssoun (Greek: Πέτρος Φυσσούν; 5 October 1933 – 5 December 2016) was a Greek actor in film and television.

== Biography ==
Petros Fyssoun was born in Agrinio, Greece, his father was a Russian émigré, who moved to Greece after the Russian Revolution. He graduated from the Drama School of Art Theatre Κarolos Koun in 1954. He performed there until 1956. From 1961 to 1965, he played lead roles for the National Theatre of Greece, and the same again in 1976-78 for the State Theatre of Northern Greece. His repertoire has included all kinds of theatre, from drama, comedy and tragedy to burlesque.

He took part in the 1965 Cannes Film Festival and the 1966 Moscow and Leningrad festivals, as well as in several festivals in Greece, including the Epidaurus Theatre Festivals.

He resided in Athens, and spoke English, Russian and Swedish.

He married Swedish actress Maud Hansson in 1965 and divorced a few years later.He then married Teta Hadjihristou, who was the daughter of the famous Greek actor Kostas Hadjihristou. They had one daughter and their marriage lasted until his death, in 2016.

== Filmography ==
Year	Title	Role	Notes
1958	Oi paranomoi	Petros	
1958	Mia laterna, mia zoi		
1962	Oi yperifanoi	Panagis Notaras	
1962	Amartoles		
1963	O adelfos Anna	Andreas	
1963	Osa kryvei i nyhta		
1964	Treason	Lieutenant Carl von Stein	
1964	Diogmos	Osen	
1965	I moira tou athoou	Lefteris	
1965	Dihasmos	Constantis	
1966	Epiheirisis 'Doureios Ippos'		
1966	O zestos minas Avgoustos	Kostas Makris	
1966	Oi enohoi	Father Grigoris	
1967	Afti i gi einai diki mas	Konstadis	
1968	O alygistos	Nikos	
1968	Brosta stin aghoni	Tilemahos	
1969	I orgi tou adikimenou	Dimitris Verenikos	
1970	Oi gennaioi tou Vorra	Vasilis Anthimos	
1971	Manto Mavrogenous	Dimitrios Ypsilantis	
1972	Aera! Aera! Aera!	Symeon	
1980	O anthropos me to garyfallo		
1983	Horis martyres	Dr. Stefanos Sofos	
1986	Mpravo kolonelo		
1989	Dexiotera tis dexias		
1998	Eternity and a Day	Narrator	Voice
2011	The Flight of the Swan	President of USA	(final film role)
