= Tonia Marketaki =

Greek film director

- Τώνια Μαρκετάκη
- Born: 28 July 1942; Piraeus, Greece
- Died: 26 July 1994 (aged 51)
- Occupations: Film director, screenwriter
- Years active: 1960–1992

Tonia Marketaki (Greek: Τώνια Μαρκετάκη; 28 July 1942 – 26 July 1994) was a Greek film director and screenwriter. She was born in Pireas and spent many of her childhood years in the Zografou district of Athens. Her maternal origins are from Kardamyla, in the island of Chios.

She received her formal training at IDHEC in Paris and upon her return to Greece she worked as a film critic in various newspapers from 1963 until 1967. The same year sees the completion of her first short-film creation and subsequent imprisonment by the then recently established Colonels' regime. Upon her release Marketaki fled abroad, working as an assistant editor in the U.K. and a director of educational films for illiterate farmers in Algeria.

In 1971 she again returned to her home-country. Apart from her three full-length films, she also directed a number of theatrical plays and a television series called Lemonodasos.

Her final film Krystallines nyhtes was screened in the Un Certain Regard section at the 1992 Cannes Film Festival. She died suddenly of a heart attack at age 51.

== Filmography ==
Year	Title	Role	Notes
1992	Krystallines Nyhtes – Κρυστάλλινες Νύχτες (Chrystal Nights)		
1983	I Timi tis Agapis – Η Τιμή της Αγάπης (The Price of Love)		
1973	Ioannis o Viaios – Ιωάννης ο Βίαιος (Ioannis the Violent)		
1967	O Giannis kai o Dromos – Ο Γιάννης και ο Δρόμος (Giannis and the Road)		
