= Georges Sari =

Greek author and actress

Zorz Sari
- Ζωρζ Σαρή
- Born: Georgia Sarivaxevani; 22 August 1923; Athens, Kingdom of Greece
- Died: 9 June 2012 (aged 88); Kolonaki, Athens, Greece
- Resting place: First Cemetery of Athens
- Citizenship: Greece
- Occupations: Novelist; writer; actress
- Spouse: Marcel Karakostas
- Children: 2
- Writing career
- Pen name: Zorz Sari
- Language: Greek
- Years active: 1958–2010
- Genre: Children's literature
- Notable awards: Thessaloniki Film Festival
- Website: zorzsari.gr

Zorz Sari (Greek: Ζωρζ Σαρή; born Georgia Sarivaxevani (Greek: Γεωργία Σαρηβαξεβάνη); 22 August 1923 – 9 June 2012), was a Greek author and actress.

== Life and career ==
Georgia Sarivaxevani was born on 22 August 1923 in Athens. Her mother was French and her father was Greek from Ayvalik, Turkey. She grew up in Greece, where she attended elementary and secondary school. World War II broke out in 1939 and Greeces' entry on the 28th October 1940 before she could finish her schooling. During the war, Sarivaxevani (later Georges Sari or Sarri) joined the Resistance and fought with the United Panhellenic Organization of Youth (EPON). Looking back on that era, she herself noted that “the years during the Nazi occupation were a time of happiness and freedom. We went from being miserable to happy because we chose the road of life, even if death had a place there as well. We grieved and rejoiced all together, but we were not afraid. There was one goal: liberation”. She graduated while Greece was still under Nazi occupation and began taking acting lessons at Dimitris Rontiris' drama school.

Georges Sari was injured during the Greek Civil War, which followed right after World War II, suffering wounds to her hand and foot from a bomb explosion. She received treatment at Aghia Olga Hospital. In 1947, she was forced to leave for Paris in exile. She worked various jobs while living there, while also enrolling as a student at the Charles Dullin School of Dramatic Art. Sari returned to Greece together with her family in 1962 and continued acting in the theater until the rise of the Military junta, at which point she decided along with other actor acquaintances to engage in passive resistance and no longer act in the theater. That summer, deprived as she was of any means of expression, she wrote her first novel – The Treasure of Vaghia – which started off like a game together with the children who surrounded her.

Sari decided to dedicate her life to writing: “In writing, I discovered all that I could not find in the theater, perhaps because I was not a leading lady or perhaps because I was not in a position to choose the roles that the producer or director would select for me. I now bear the full responsibility for my books. I do what I want; what I can.”

She wrote numerous books. In 1994 she won the Best Children Literature book award for her book Ninet (which was a semi-autobiography of her sister). In 1995 and 1999 she was awarded with the Greek Cycle of Books. In 1988 she was nominated for the Hans Christian Andersen Award. Furthermore, as an actress, she was nominated for Best Supporting Actress in the Thessaloniki Film Festival.

== Death ==
Sari died at her home in the Kolonaki neighbourhood of Athens, on 9 June 2012, at age 88.

== Works ==
=== Novels ===
- Ο Θησαυρός της Βαγίας (1969) (The Treasure of Vaghia)
- Το Ψέμα (1970) (The lie)
- Όταν ο Ήλιος… (1971) (When the Sun...)
- Κόκκινη κλωστή δεμένη… (1974) (Red thread tied)
- Τα γενέθλια (1977) (Birthday)
- Τα στενά παπούτσια (1979) (The tight shoes)
- Οι νικητές (1983) (The winners)
- Τα Χέγια (1987) (Hegia)
- Το παραράδιασμα (1989) (The Assembly Line)
- Κρίμα κι άδικο (1990) (Pitiful and unfair)
- Nινέτ (1993) (Ninette)
- Zoυμ (1994) (Zoum)
- Ε.Π. (1995) (U.F.)
- Μια αγάπη για δύο (1996) (One love for two with Argiro Kokoreli)
- Ο Χορός της ζωής (1998) (The dance of life)
- Σοφία (2000) (Sofia)
- Κλειστά Χαρτιά (2001) (Hole Cards, with Melina Karakosta)
- Ο Κύριός μου (2002) (My teacher)
- Τότε... (2004) (Then...)
- Γράμμα από την Οδησσό (2005) (Letter form Odessa)
- Το προτελευταίο σκαλοπάτι (2009) (The step before the last one)

=== Children's books ===
- Το κουμπί και μια βελόνα (2010) (The Button and the Needle)
- Το γαϊτανάκι (1973) (The Carousel)
- Ο Φρίκος ο Κοντορεβυθούλης μου (1980) (Tom Thumb)
- Η σοφή μας η δασκάλα (1982) (Our wise teacher)
- Η κυρία Κλοκλό (1986–1987) (Miss Kloklo, eight volumes)
- Ο Τοτός και η Τοτίνα (1988–1990) (Totos and Totina, eight volumes)
- Ο Αρλεκίνος (1993) (The Harlequin)
- Η Πολυλογού (1993) (The Babbler)

=== Filmography ===
- Το τελευταίο ψέμμα (1958) (The last lie)
- Ο άνθρωπος του τραίνου (1958) (Train's man)
- Έγκλημα στα παρασκήνια (1960) (Backstage Crime)
- Φεύγω με πίκρα στα ξένα (1964) (I leave in sorrow abroad)
- Προδοσία (1964) (Betrayal)
- Το Μπλόκο (1965) (The road block)
- Το νησί της Αφροδίτης (1969) (Aphrodite's Island)
- Χάππυ νταίη [Happy day] (1976) (Happy Day)
- Ελευθέριος Βενιζέλος 1910–1927 (1980) (Eleutherios Venizelos)
- Γενέθλια πόλη (1987) (Hometown)
