= Stamatis Spanoudakis =

Greek classical composer

- Born: 11 December 1948 (age 77); Athens, Greece
- Genres: Instrumental, religious, soundtracks and songs
- Occupations: Composer, lyricist, arranger, producer and performer
- Instruments: Vocals, keyboards, piano, electric and acoustic guitars, bass, bouzouki and drums
- Years active: 1971–present
- Labels: Philips, Seagull, ΕΜΙ, Lyra, MINOS EMI, CBS/Sony Music, Polydor, Warner Music, Stam Studio
- Website: www.stamatisspanoudakis.com

Stamatis Spanoudakis (Greek: Σταμάτης Σπανουδάκης; born 11 December 1948 in Athens, Greece) is a modern Greek classical composer. In his early career, he studied classical guitar. He shifted to rock music, but then continued classical studies at the Würzburg State Conservatory (now the Hochschule für Musik) with Bertold Hummel and later in Athens with Konstantinos Kydoniatis. Later, he studied Byzantine music. He has worked with various Greek singers, composing the music and writing the lyrics for a large number of hit songs (I akti, Pame gi’alles polities, Lathos epohi, Simera, Efiges noris, Zoi klemmeni, Kalimera ti kanis). With his religious works, he has provided a very different perspective of contemporary Byzantine music (Kyrie ton Dynameon, Efta Paraklisis, Imera Triti, Earini Ora). He has also composed numerous soundtracks (Colours of Iris, Angel, Sudden Love, Stone Years, All in a road, Brides). Since 1994, he has exclusively composed instrumental music, such as music that embraces Greece's history and religion (Alexandros, John's Tear, Marble King, For Smyrni, A Piece of My Soul, Moments Gone, Alexandros II, Rejoice my sea).

== Biography ==
Stamatis Spanoudakis hails from an esteemed Greek family in Athens. His early fascination with music led him to pursue classical studies, specializing in guitar and theory. In the 1960s and 1970s, he immersed himself in the rock and pop scene, playing bass guitar and keyboards in various bands across Athens, Paris, and London. During this time, he also recorded his first albums.

Returning to his classical roots, Spanoudakis resumed his composition studies under the guidance of Professor Bertold Hummel in Würzburg and Professor Konstantinos Kydoniatis in Athens. A subsequent exploration of Byzantine music ignited his passion for Greek songwriting and instrumental compositions.

Today, Spanoudakis strives to seamlessly integrate his diverse musical influences—rock, classical, and Byzantine—into his work. He has penned numerous hit songs for renowned Greek musicians and composed scores for successful films, theater productions, and television programs in Greece, Germany, and Italy. With a discography exceeding sixty albums, his contributions to the music industry are extensive.

Since 1995, Spanoudakis has focused on instrumental music inspired by Greek historical and religious themes, garnering significant popularity in Greece. He currently resides in a suburb of Athens with his wife, Dori, and their four dogs. In his personal studio, Spanoudakis records, composes, arranges, produces, performs, and engineers his musical endeavors.

== Discography ==
Album/CD title	Published by	Year
Beautiful Lies Songs with Stamatis Spanoudakis	Philips	1971
Looking Back Songs with Stamatis Spanoudakis	Seagull	1974
Promitheus Original soundtrack from the film by Kostas Feris	Seagull	1974
Colours of iris Original soundtrack from the film by Nikos Panayiotopoulos	Seagull	1975
To the first musician A religious record with Stamatis and a vocal group of friends	Seagull	1977
Let's listen together Stories for children. Texts by Maria Goumenopoulou. Nαrrαted by Kostas Giannikos	Seagull	1977
Nestor's company Children's songs, with Nestor, Dori, Eva and Stamatis	Seagull	1977
Nestor's dream Children's songs, with Nestor, Dori and Stamatis	Seagull	1978
Maran atha Stamatis's first instrumental record	Seagull	1978
Songs of love Songs with Dimitris Tamposis and friends	Seagull	1979
The garden with the statues Music from the TV series of Pantelis Voulgaris	ΕΜΙ	1980
The story teller Music from the TV series of Nikos Pilavios	Seagull	1980
The story teller ΙΙ Music from the TV series of Nikos Pilavios	Seagull	1981
Lord of the powers A religious record with Giannis Koutras and Eleni Vitali	Lyra	1981
Angel Original soundtrack from the film by Giorgos Katakouzinos	Lyra	1981
Dies Irae A religious record with Michalis Dimitriades and Electra	Lyra	1982
Sudden love Original soundtrack from the film by Giorgos Tsemperopoulos	MINOS EMI	1983
Something is happening here The first collaboration of Stamatis with Vassilis Saleas. With Giannis Ekmektsoglou on electric guitar and Chiko on drums. .	MINOS EMI	1984
Seven prayers A religious record with Eleni Vitali and children's choir	MINOS EMI	1985
Senza tempo Songs with Demi Roussos	Warner Music	1985
Stone years Original soundtrack from the film by Pantelis Voulgaris	Lyra	1985
Contrabando Songs with Eleutheria Arvanitaki. This was his first whole album, for a singer	Lyra	1987
Absences Original soundtrack from the film by Giorgos Katakouzinos	Lyra	1987
On the way Songs with Stamatis Spanoudakis	Lyra	1987
And we came into the years Songs with Eleni Vitali	Columbia/ Sony Music	1988
Two steps from the sand Songs with Alkistis Protopsalti	Polygram	1989
Tanirama Songs with Eleutheria Arvanitaki	Polygram	1989
Ping Pong A rock record, with electric and acoustic guitars, synths and drums.	Polygram	1989
Striker Number 9 Original soundtrack from the film by Pantelis Voulgaris Striker no 9	CBS	1989
Third Day A religious record with Manolis Mitsias and Vassilis Saleas	CBS	1990
The dilemma Songs with Petros Gaitanos	Polygram	1990
Bye bye Original soundtrack from the film by Giorgos Tsemperopoulos	Columbia/ Sony Music	1991
I'm fine, thank you Songs with Manolis Mitsias	Sony Music	1991
Thalassa.	Sony Music	1992
Touch Songs with Giannis Parios	Minos EMI	1992
Where do you go when you sleep Songs with Dori Spanoudakis	MINOS EMI	1992
Iris / Promitheus / Maran atha 3 of the earlier instrumental and soundtracks, together in one record	Stam Studio	1994
With words A compilation of hit songs	Stam Studio	1994
Alexandros (The myth of the east, the dream of the west) This album tells the tale of Alexander the Great	Stam Studio	1994
Moments gone.	Stam Studio	1995
Holy Hour An album filled with melodies of the Greek orthodox religious hymns as well as originals by the artist. With Vassilis Saleas and Lefteris Zervas	Stam Studio	1995
John's Tear Music for the revelation of St. John	Stam Studio	1996
Moments gone II Contemporary musical arrangements	Stam Studio	1996
The Marble King A musical impression of Constantine Palaiologos, the last martyr Emperor of Constantinople. A tribute to Agia Sofia and the fall of his beloved city in 1453.	Stam Studio	1998
All In A Journey Original soundtrack of the film by Pantelis Voulgaris. It includes the saxophone and Greek lyra, accompanied by piano and contrabass.	Stam Studio	1998
Facing the audience A live performance of the best of Spanoudakis's works, performed by a string orchestra, a choir and an elite of soloists of traditional Greek instruments	Stam Studio	1998
Nineteenhundredandninetynine A musical journey honoring the year before the millennium	Stam Studio	1999
Before the exhibition A compilation of Stamatis's music made for artist's Vasiliki exhibition in Paris	Stam Studio	2000
Moments gone III.	Stam Studio	2000
For Smyrni The artist's musical perception of events that took place in Smyrni in the early twentieth century	Stam Studio	2001
The Essential Collection The absolute "Best of" Stamatis Spanoudakis's works. Digitally remastered all on a double CD album.	Stam Studio	2002
Piece of my soul A combination of children's voices and mixed teenage choir with Spyros Lambrou choir	Stam Studio	2003
Music for films A compilation of film themes	Stam Studio	2004
Brides Original soundtrack of the film "Brides". Directed by Pantelis Voulgaris and produced by Martin Scorsese. Includes traditional instruments and Byzantine voices.	Stam Studio	2004
Live at the Royal Albert Hall Some of the best pieces of Stamatis Spanoudakis, performed live at the Royal Albert Hall by the Royal Philharmonic Concert Orchestra and the London Symphony Choir.	Stam Studio	2006
Alexandros II (Paths you never walked) Performed by ERT Symphony Orchestra and Choir and Stamatis's band	Lyra	2009
Live in China Live recording in Beijing. Performed live by ERT Symphony Orchestra and Choir and Stamatis's band.	Stam Studio	2009
Je veux toujours être avec toi Various tracks with Dori Spanoudakis, in French	Stam Studio	2011
Rejoice my sea A blend of melodies children's voices, classical and ambient orchestrations, guitars, pianos and violins.	Stam Studio	2013
Bathed in the sun.	Stam Studio	2016
