= The Matchmaking of Anna =

1972 film by Pantelis Voulgaris

- Directed by: Pantelis Voulgaris
- Starring: Anna Vagena; Smaro Veaki
- Release date: 26 September 1972 (TFF)
- Running time: 82 minutes
- Country: Greece
- Language: Greek

The Matchmaking of Anna (Greek: Το προξενιό της Άννας) is a 1972 Greek drama film directed by Pantelis Voulgaris.

== Cast ==
- Anna Vagena - Anna Vlasopoulou
- Smaro Veaki - Anna's mistress
- Kostas Rigopoulos - Thodoros Manolopoulos
- Stavros Kalaroglou - Kosmas Raptis
- Alekos Oudinotis - Kostis Efstathiou
- Aliki Zografou - Elisavet
- Maria Martika - Kaiti Manolopoulou
- Eirini Emirza - Vaso
- Mika Flora - Haroula
- Giorgos Garoufallou - Giorgos
- Giorgos Morton - uncle
- Loula Christara - Leni Vlasopoulou
- Athina Lambropoulou - Tania
- Kostas Ziogas - waiter
