= Dinos Katsouridis =

- Born: 1927; Nicosia, Cyprus
- Died: 28 November 2011 (aged 83–84); Athens, Greece
- Occupations: Director, Cinemathographer, Editor

Dinos Katsouridis (1927 - 28 November 2011) was a Greek Cypriot film director, cinematographer and editor. He had worked in a lot of Greek films sometimes as director, sometimes as film editor and sometimes as cinematographer as well as writer. He has won film awards about all the categories of these works

== Biography ==
He was born in Nicosia in 1927. He started to study Law Studies but he forsaked them in order to deal with cinema. He studied film direction in Stavrakos School and he debuted in 1951 as assistant director in the film Pikro Psomi. Since 1960, he started to work as film director. His first films as director was the films Englima sta Paraskinia and Eimai Athoos. In 1963, he directed two successful comedies with Kostas Hatzichristos in Leading role, the films Tis Kakomoiras and O Kyrios Pterarchos. Since 1970, he directed movies that starred Thanasis Veggos. He has won four awards in Thessaloniki Film Festival in categories Best Film, Best Screenplay and Best Cinematography.

== Filmography ==
As Director

- Englima sta Paraskinia 1960
- Eimai Athoos]] 1960
- O Kyrios Pterarchos 1963
- Tis Kakomoiras 1963
- Adistaktoi 1965
- Syntomo dialeimma 1966
- O Thanasis, i Ioulietta kai ta loukanika 1970
- Enas Vengos gia oles tis douleies 1970
- What Did You Do in the War, Thanasi? 1971
- Thanasi, pare t' oplo sou 1972
- O Thanasis sti hora tis sfaliaras 1976
- O palavos kosmos tou Thanasi 1979
- O falakros mathitis 1979
- Vengos, o trellos kamikazi 1980
- O Thanasis kai to katarameno fidi 1982
- Oneiro aristeris nyhtas 1987

== Awards ==
Awards
| Year | Award | Category | Film | Result |
|---|---|---|---|---|
| 1965 | Thessaloniki Film Festival | Best Cinematography | Oi Adistaktoi | Won |
| 1971 | Thessaloniki Film Festival | Best Film | What Did You Do in the War, Thanasi? | Won |
| 1971 | Thessaloniki Film Festival | Best Screenplay | What Did You Do in the War, Thanasi? | Won |
| 1984 | Thessaloniki Film Festival | Best Cinematography | O Erotas tou Odyssea | Won |
