= Pantelis Voulgaris =

Greek film director

- Born: 23 October 1940 (age 85); Athens, Greece
- Occupations: Film director, screenwriter
- Years active: 1965–present

Pantelis Voulgaris (Greek: Παντελής Βούλγαρης; born 23 October 1940) is a Greek film director and screenwriter. His first feature film To proxenio tis Annas in 1972 won the first prize in Thessaloniki International Film Festival. His 1989 film The Striker with Number 9 was entered into the 39th Berlin International Film Festival. Two years later, his film Quiet Days in August was entered into the 41st Berlin International Film Festival. In 2005 his film Brides was entered into the 27th Moscow International Film Festival.

== Selected filmography ==
- The Matchmaking of Anna (Το προξενιό της Άννας; To proxenio tis Annas) (1972)
- Happy Day (Χάππυ Νταίη) (1977)
- Eleftherios Venizelos 1910–1927 (Ελευθέριος Βενιζέλος: 1910-1927) (1980)
- Stone Years (Πέτρινα Χρόνια; Petrina Chronia) (1985)
- The Striker with Number 9 (Η φανέλα με το 9; I fanela me to 9) (1989)
- Quiet Days in August (Ήσυχες μέρες του Αυγούστου; Isyhes meres tou Avgoustou) (1991)
- Akropol (Ακροπόλ) (1995)
- It's a Long Road (Όλα είναι δρόμος; Óla eínai drómos) (1998)
- Brides (Νύφες; Nyfes) (2004)
- Deep Soul (Ψυχή Βαθιά; Psychi Vathia) (2009)
- Little England (Μικρά Αγγλία; Mikra Anglia) (2013)
- The Last Note (Το Τελευταίο Σημείωμα; To Teleftaio Simeioma) (2017)
