= Nikos Koundouros =

Greek film director

- Born: 15 December 1926; Agios Nikolaos, Crete, Greece
- Died: 22 February 2017 (aged 90); Athens, Greece
- Occupation: Film director

Nikos Koundouros (Greek: Νίκος Κούνδουρος [ˈkunðuros]; 15 December 1926 – 22 February 2017) was a Greek film director.

== Biography ==
Koundouros was born in Agios Nikolaos, Crete, in 1926. He studied painting and sculpture at the Athens School of Fine Arts. During the war he was a member of the left-wing resistance movement EAM-ELAS, and because of this was subsequently exiled to the Makronissos prison island. At the age of 28 he decided to follow a career in cinematography. He started his career as a director of the film Magiki Polis (1954), where he combined his neorealism influences with his own artistic viewpoint. He cast Thanasis Veggos, who he had met at Makronissos, as one of the characters in Magiki Polis. After the release of his complex and innovative film O Drakos (1956), he found acceptance as a prominent artist in Greece and Europe, and acquired important awards in various international and Greek film festivals. His 1963 film Young Aphrodites won the Silver Bear for Best Director at the 13th Berlin International Film Festival. In 1985 he was a member of the jury at the 14th Moscow International Film Festival.

== Filmography ==
=== Films ===
- Magiki Polis, English: Enchanted City (1954)
- O Drakos, English: Draco (1956)
- Oi Paranomoi, English: The outlaws (1958)
- To Potami, English: The river (1960)
- Mikres Aphrodites: English: Young Aphrodites, English Title: Young Aphrodites (1963)
- To Prosopo tis Medousas, English: The face of Medusa, English Title: Vortex (1967)
- To tragoudi tis fotias, English: The song of fire (1975)
- 1922 (1978)
- Bordello, English: Brothel (1984)
- Byron, balanta gia enan daimonismeno, English: Byron, Ballad for a possessed (1992)
- Oi fotografoi, English: The photographers (1998)
- To ploio, English: The Ship (2011) by Showtime Productions (www.showtimeproductions.gr)

=== TV documentaries ===
- Ifigeneia en Tavrois (1991)
- Antigoni (1994)
- Ellinisti Kypros
- Cinemithologia (2010) by Showtime Productions
