= List of Greek films of the 1980s =

A list of notable films produced in Greece in the 1980s.

== 1980s ==
Title	Director	Cast	Genre	Notes
1980
The Man with the Carnation	Nikos Tzimas			Entered into the 12th Moscow International Film Festival
Thanasi, sfixe ki allo to zonari Θανάση, σφίξε κι άλλο το ζωνάρι	Thodoros Marangos	Thanassis Veggos, Anna Matzourani, Ilias Logothetis, Nikos Kalogeropoulos	Comedy/Drama	IMDb
1981
Learn How to Read and Write, Son (Μάθε παιδί μου γράμματα)	Thodoros Marangos	Vasilis Diamantopoulos, Nikos Kalogeropoulos	Comedy	4 Awards in Thessaloniki Film Festival
Enas kontos tha mas sosei Ένας κοντός θα μας σώσει	Kostas Karayannis	Nikos Rizos, Elena Nathanail, Dinos Iliopoulos	Comedy	IMDb
Garsoniera gia deka Γκαρσονιέρα για δέκα	Dimis Dadiras	Hronis Exarhakos, Betty Arvaniti, Andreas Filippides	Comedy	IMDb
Ta Tsakalia; Τα τσακάλια	Giannis Dalianidis	Panos Mihalopoulos, Athina Tsilyra, Sophia Aliberti	Action Drama	IMDb
1982
Angel	Giorgos Katakouzinos			3 Awards in Thessaloniki Film Festival
Anametrisi	Giorgos Karypidis	Zoe Laskari	Mystery	
Alaloum; Αλαλούμ	Giorgos Apostolidis	Harry Klynn	Comedy	IMDb
Vasika... kalispera sas Βασικά... καλησπέρα σας	Giannis Dalianidis	Stathis Psaltis, Panos Mihalopoulos	Comedy	IMDb
I Strofi; Η στροφή	Giannis Dalianidis	Panos Mihalopoulos, Sophia Aliberti, Koula Agagiotou	Action Drama	IMDb
1983
Sweet Bunch (Glykia Symmoria, Γλυκιά Συμμορία)	Nikos Nikolaidis	Despina Tomazani, Dora Masklavanou, Takis Moschos	Drama	4 Awards in Thessaloniki Film Festival
Rebetiko; Ρεμπέτικο	Costas Ferris	Sotiria Leonardou, Themis Bazaka, Nikos Dimitratos	Drama/Music	Won the Silver Bear at Berlin; 4 Awards in Thessaloniki Film Festival
Homecoming Song	Yannis Smaragdis			Entered into the 13th Moscow International Film Festival
1984
Loufa kai parallagi (Λούφα και παραλλαγή)	Nikos Perakis	Nikos Kalogeropoulos, Giorgos Kimoulis	Comedy	4 Awards in Thessaloniki Film Festival; Entered into the 35th Berlin International Film Festival
The Descent of the Nine	Christos Siopahas			3 Awards in Thessaloniki Film Festival; Won the Golden Prize the 14th Moscow International Film Festival
Voyage to Cythera (Ταξίδι στα Κύθηρα)	Theodoros Angelopoulos	Manos Katrakis		Won the Best Screenplay Award in 1984 Cannes Film Festival
An itan to violi pouli Αν ήταν το βιολί πουλί	Takis Vougiouklakis	Sotiris Moustakas, Giannis Mihalopoulos, Giannis Vogiatzis	Comedy	IMDb
1985
Mania; Μανία	Giorgos Panousopoulos	Alexandra Vanzi, Aris Retsos	Adventure	Entered into the 36th Berlin International Film Festival
1986
The Beekeeper; Ο Μελισσοκόμος,	Theodoros Angelopoulos			Entered into the 43rd Venice International Film Festival
Peraste... filiste... teliosate! Περάστε... φιλήστε... τελειώσατε!	Giannis Dalianidis	Panos Mihalopoulos, Stamatis Gardelis	Comedy	IMDb
Roz gatos, O Ο ροζ γάτος	Yiannis Hartomatzidis	Sotiris Moustakas, Panos Mihalopoulos	Comedy	IMDb
1987
Theofilos	Lakis Papastathis			3 Awards in Thessaloniki Film Festival; Entered into the 38th Berlin International Film Festival
Morning Patrol; Πρωϊνή Περίπολος	Nikos Nikolaidis	Michele Valley, Takis Spiridakis, Liana Hatzi	Drama	1 Award in Thessaloniki Film Festival
THE... Copanoi (Οι... ΚΟΠΑΝΟΙ)	Giorgos Konstadinou	Giorgos Konstadinou, Giannis Vouros	Comedy	IMDb
1988
Landscape in the Mist (Topio stin omichli, Τοπίο στην Ομίχλη)	Theo Angelopoulos	Tania Palaiologou	Drama	Best European Film in 2nd European Film Awards; Won the Silver Lion in 45th Venice International Film Festival
In the Shadow of Fear	Giorgos Karypidis	Giorgos Konstas	Drama	5 Awards in Thessaloniki Film Festival
1989
The Striker with Number 9	Pantelis Voulgaris			2 Awards in Thessaloniki Film Festival; Entered into the 39th Berlin International Film Festival
Oh Babylon	Costas Ferris	Alkis Panagiotidis, Nikolas Asimos	Tragedy	3 Awards in Thessaloniki Film Festival
