= List of drama films of the 1970s =

This is a list of drama films of the 1970s.

== 1970 ==
- The American Soldier
- The Butcher
- The Conformist
- Gods of the Plague
- Mujo
- Tora! Tora! Tora!
- Valerie and Her Week of Wonders

== 1971 ==
- Beware of a Holy Whore
- A Clockwork Orange
- Love
- The Song of the Blood-Red Flower

== 1972 ==
- Across 110th Street
- Aguirre, the Wrath of God
- The Bitter Tears of Petra von Kant
- The Final Comedown
- The Goalkeeper's Fear of the Penalty
- The Godfather
- Lady Sings the Blues
- Last Tango in Paris
- Solaris

== 1973 ==
- Adiós, Alejandra, Andrea
- Amarcord
- The Exorcist
- The Homecoming
- Serpico

== 1974 ==
- Ali: Fear Eats the Soul
- The Clockmaker
- The Godfather Part II
- The Night Porter
- Sweet Movie
- Vase de Noces
- A Woman Under the Influence

== 1975 ==
- Barry Lyndon
- Das Erdbeben in Chili
- Evrydiki BA 2O37
- Jeanne Dielman, 23 quai du Commerce, 1080 Bruxelles
- Mahogany
- The Mirror
- Nashville
- One Flew Over the Cuckoo's Nest
- Picnic at Hanging Rock
- Salò, or the 120 Days of Sodom
- Unter dem Pflaster ist der Strand
- A Woman's Decision

== 1976 ==
- 1900
- All the President's Men
- In the Realm of the Senses
- The Killing of a Chinese Bookie
- Man of Marble
- Midway
- Rocky
- Taxi Driver

== 1977 ==
- 3 Women
- The Ascent
- Hitler: A Film from Germany
- The Last Wave
- Opening Night
- The Report
- Saturday Night Fever
- Unsichtbare Gegner
- The Year of the Hare

== 1978 ==
- Blue Collar
- The Deer Hunter
- Ice Castles
- Interiors
- Killer of Sheep
- You Are Not Alone
- Das zweite Erwachen der Christa Klages

== 1979 ==
- Hathiar
- Kramer vs. Kramer
- The Marriage of Maria Braun
- Norma Rae
- The Seduction of Joe Tynan
- Sisters, or the Balance of Happiness
- Stalker
- The Wretches Are Still Singing
- El lugar del humo
- Vengeance Is Mine
