= Aristidis Pagratidis =

Alleged Greek serial killer

- Born: May 1940; Langadikia, Chalkidiki, Greece
- Died: 16 February 1968 (aged 27); Heptapyrgion, Greece
- Cause of death: Execution by firing squad
- Other name: "The Ogre of Seikh Sou"
- Conviction: Murder
- Penalty: Death

Details
- Victims: 3
- Span of crimes: 1958–1959
- Country: Greece
- Date apprehended: 7 December 1963

Aristidis Pagratidis (Greek: Αριστείδης Παγκρατίδης; May 1940 – 16 February 1968) was a Greek man who was accused of committing a series of murders and predatory attacks on couples in the forest area of Seikh Sou in 1959.

He was arrested in December 1963 after he attacked a 12-year-old in the "Alexander the Great" orphanage. He was tried in October 1964 and sentenced to nine years in prison. During interrogations, he confessed to being the notorious "Ogre of Seikh Sou". He was retried in February 1966 and sentenced to death as a "dangerous person for public safety", and was executed on 16 February 1968.

Pagratidis quickly recanted his confession, claiming he was psychologically pressured and beaten, and until the moment of his execution, he remained firm in his innocence. Since then, whether he was innocent or not remains debatable, with most claiming he was innocent.

== Early life ==
He was born in May 1940 in the village of Langadikia, the youngest of three children to poor farmers. His father, Charalambos Pagratidis, captain of the Greek army in World War II, was assassinated by ELAS guerillas during the civil war period in 1945. The family (Aristidis' brother Pangratis, his sister Marika, himself and their mother Eleni), having lost their basic support, left Langadikia and settled in Toumba. The mother tried to preserve the family by taking any available work, later acquainting with a bus collector, Evgenios Alexiadis, marrying him and keeping with them Aristidis, while the older children were sent to live with relatives in Piraeus. Aristidis, or Aristos as some called him, attended only the first two grades of primary school (of which the first grade took three years to finish), and had problems with writing and reading. He worked various menial jobs, from a lemon seller to a glazier, from a shredder to a waiter and from a hammock at the Thessaloniki harbour, to an assistant in amusement parks. At the age of 10, he was sexually assaulted by a chemist for drachmas. Since then, when hunger threatened his life, he was used this way to make money. One of his first clients was a blacksmith named Vasilis Baradazoglou, who, in his court statement said with the lure of the little money he gave him, Pagratidis let him laugh: This child, Pagratidis, I met ten years ago. He sold his body for ten drachmas. He was coming with me and doing the job. I approached him. I knew it was a sign. We went to Rendzhi, I gave him 15 drachmas. I've been with him many times. So have other men in the harbour. In 1955, he stole 120 drachmas from the canteen of the P.A.O.K. gymnasium, was arrested and put under a child welfare program. In the same year, he stole and sold two bikes along with a friend, and with the money he planned to move to Athens. But both were apprehended, tried by the Minority Court of Thessaloniki and sent to the Minor Restoration Center in Vido. In 1957 he left the institution, returned to Thessaloniki and resumed work at the port. He also worked as a waiter in a country house, a waiter in a cafeteria, and any other work that he could find. In 1959, while working in the city circus, he was drafted into the army. In 1960, he was put into the 20th Armored Cavalry Division. After his desertion in May 1961, he was dismissed as mentally disturbed due to his drug addiction. He often visited prostitutes, but was also issued to men willing to pay as a cross-dresser, smoking hashish and drinking wine. In a typical way at the time, the court prosecutor wrote: "Pangratidis, in no case of diligence and education, has been turned into a way of corruption, having acquired a great deal of anomalous character and confused ... He was an energetic homosexual, voyeur, a robber, an outsider, a drinker, a deserter, and a hashish abuser."

== "Ogre of Seikh Sou" attacks and Pagratidis' arrest ==
=== "The Ogre of Seikh Sou" ===
In February 1958, in the area of the Panorama forest, a young woman was killed with a stone by an unknown young man. The accidental presence of a car that was going up in the woods, however, blew the perpetrator out.

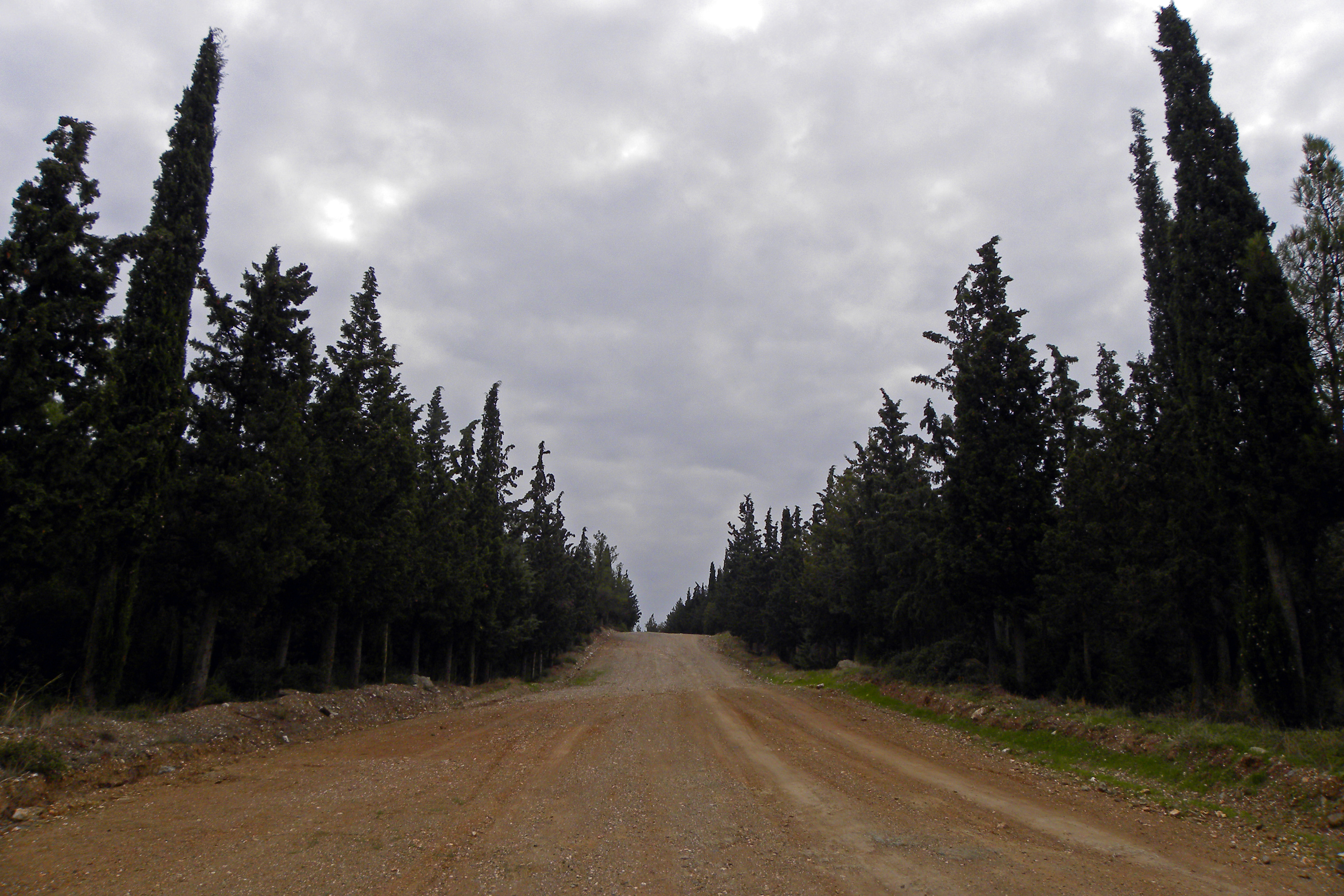
Seikh Sou

A year later, on 19 February 1959, the perpetrator attacked again, this time a couple – Athanasios Panagiotou and Eleonora Vlachogianni – isolated in the forest, who suffered heavy injuries, which they however survived. In the next few months, the perpetrator attacked another two couples in the area, but they survived as well without any significant injuries. On 6 March 1959, another attack was made in Mikra, in which the killer murdered Konstantinos Raisis and raped his girlfriend Evdokia Paliogiannis. On 3 April of the same year, the Ogre entered the Municipal Hospital of Thessaloniki and killed one of the foundation's nurses, Melpomeni Patrikio, again using a stone. While he was leaving the building, he attacked another nurse who crossed paths with him, Faney Tsambazi, threatening to kill her before leaving.

In March 1959, a prize of 100,000 drachmas was announced for the killer's capture. The money would be given as a fee for arresting the perpetrator or providing specific information that would lead to his arrest.

=== "Alexander the Great" incident and Pagratidis' arrest ===
At 3:00 on 7 December 1963, Pagratidis secretly entered the "Alexander the Great" orphanage carrying a stone, and attempted to smite and rape a 12-year-old girl at the orphanage's sickroom. The child's screaming, however, frightened him and he fled the scene, escaping the orphanage. Along the way, he came across a city bus driver, who saw him running and stopped the man. Pagratidis managed to flee, but the driver alerted the police. A police officer remembered seeing a man who matched Pagratidis' description spying around the orphanage some hours before the break-in and asked for details, managing to uncover his identity. Three hours after the attack, the police arrived at his home in Upper Toumba's 'German' area, not far from the orphanage, and arrested him. Pagratidis did not resist, and after he was recognized by the victim and the bus driver, he confessed to the break-in. The newspapers, at the very first mention of the crime, connected Pagratidis with an until-then-unknown criminal called the "Ogre of Seikh Sou".

== Interrogation ==
The arrested and detained in the Thessaloniki Security Subdivision for the attempted rape of 12-year-old child Aikaterini Sourpa at the Thessaloniki Teenagers Orphanage "Alexander the Great", Aristidis Pagratidis, 23 years old, confessed to an interrogator in the presence of the Thessaloniki prosecutor that he had committed the following offences in the past:

- Escaping after an attempted manslaughter against Athanasios Panagiotu and Eleonora Vlachogianni in Seikh Sou on 18 February 1959

- Homicide following a robbery at the expense of Konstantinos Raisis and Evdokia Paliogiannis in a rural area near Mikra airport

- Homicide at the expense of Melpomeni Patrikio in a residence of the Municipal Hospital of Thessaloniki

The perpetrator of the filed cases is referred to the competent prosecutor today.

Director A. Peta

Because of his life, Pagratidis was already known to the police. Since his adolescence he had been involved with them, first with bicycle theft, and then with petty thefts, possession and use of hashish, allegations of hunter-gatherer behaviour, and attacks on young girls and young men. From the very first moment of his arrest, the newspapers (with or without the police's encouragement) have pointed him out as the "Ogre of Seikh Sou", aggressively stressing the point that he had used the same weapon as the Ogre while attempting to rape the girl. In the following days, he was isolated in the General Security Detention Facilities in Thessaloniki, the survivors of the attacks were called upon to identify him, but none were able to do so with certainty. For five whole days and nights after his arrest, Pagratidis was questioned. The investigation was carried out by Deputy Prosecutor Athanasopoulos along with General Security Commander of Thessaloniki, Tzavaras. On December 11, 1963, Pagratidis confessed to the crimes he was accused of. The news was not given to the public immediately, rather than three days later - on December 15, - since, in the meantime, the police received a full confession with many previously unknown details. Specifically, Pagratidis led the police officers to the site of the Mikra site, and showed them how he killed Raisis (two strikes with the stone to his head), how he stunned his girlfriend, raped her and stole Raisis' lighter, leaving afterwards. The next day he went to the Municipal Hospital, where he killed, raped and robbed the young Patrikio. Then, he narrated the attempted murder of nurse Tsambazi, who had failed to positively recognize him. The competent prosecutor described the attack on the 12-year-old and in conjunction with the "4000 Law", referred the case (enclosing the 1953 crime files) to the regular investigator to proceed to the next stage of the trial, regular interrogation.

As soon as his own people took care of lawyers, M. Sapountzis and D. Lazo, and now he was in the hands of the judiciary, he immediately recalled his confession. He claimed that not only were the confessions forced, but the orphanage attack did not take place as disclosed by the police. Pagratidis informed his lawyers that he was subjected to physical and mental abuse, saying the following: "At 9 o'clock at night, they said I should confess, and put me in a room, splashing water on me. Then we went to another room, where they only gave a nut to eat. There they kept me up until 10 AM. I was asking for water and they did not give me. 'Tell us', they were telling me, 'that you are the ogre and we will give you'... In the meantime, by thirst, I stammered. For a moment I did not stand. 'Give me water', I said, 'and I will tell you what you want." Pagratidis told his lawyers that during the six days of the interrogation, he only drank two glasses of water and a glass of tea, and ate four slices of bread, three sandwiches, a plate of potatoes, and a spinach dish. Surprised by what the lawyers said, on 18 December, judicial authorities forbid any further reference or photograph of this case to all newspapers in Thessaloniki and Athens.

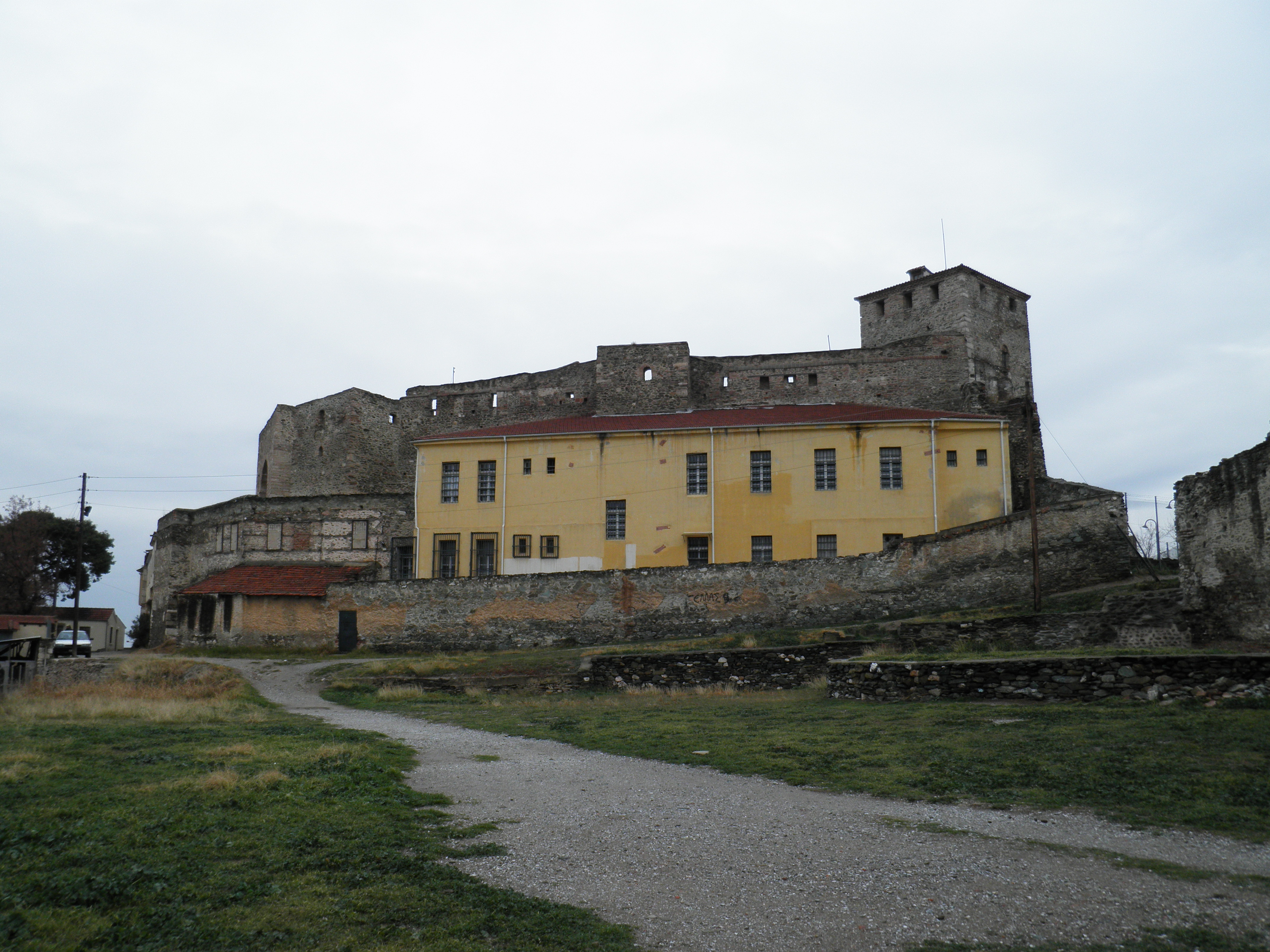
Heptapyrgion prison

== The trial for attempted rape ==
On 5 October 1964, while the regular investigation into the Seikh Sou forest murders was not yet over, Aristidis was tried in the Heptapyrgion prison by the Thessaloniki Court for the attempted rape of 12-year-old Aikaterini Sourpa. The victim, orphanage employees and friends of Pagratidis were present. Pagratidis' friends testified that in the past hours, they were all together in a tavern where they drank heavily, and when they separated, Aristos was drunk. This was also claimed to by his attorneys, which eventually succeeded in persuading the jury, who changed the accusation from "rape attempt" to "coercion into futility". Based on this decision, his court imposed a nine-year prison sentence, a five-year deprivation of his civil rights, and a pecuniary allowance of 7,000 drachmas to the victim. Pagratidis said in his apology:

"What they say about the crimes is lies. I did not kill everybody. I admit that I went to the 'Alexander the Great' orphanage to hurt the girl, but was because of the wine and hashish. I did this and I confess it. But I did not kill to get money.

I was tortured as a teen. I was selling my body for 10 drachmas to eat. I was selling my blood to the Red Cross to get money to eat. I'm not a criminal. If I wanted to become a criminal, I would kill my father's killer who lives today in our village. I confess that I was wrong. I was wrong a lot. And that's why I want you to try me. Inside the prison I saw a lot and learned a lot. Now I have changed and that's why I want to be punished."

== The trial ==
His trial, which, as expected was gathering crowds every day, and was one of the most important events for Thessaloniki at the time.

It began on Friday, February 11, 1966, at the Pentecostal Court of Appeal of Thessaloniki and ended on February 22, 1966, with the declaration that Pagratidis was guilty of all the accused crimes, and sentenced to four counts of the death penalty. The president of the court was the aesthetist of Thessaloniki, Aletras, and congressmen were Kounougeris, Gallas, Graphicanakis and Papayiannis, while the then prosecutor's office was occupied by the then Deputy Prosecutor of the Court of Appeal Michalis Sgouritsas. As a civil action, the attorneys of Athanasios Panagiotou and the attorneys of the Raisis family were present. Ombudsmen of Pagratidis were the lawyers appointed by his brother, M. Sapontzis and D. Lazoon the first day of the trial, the survivors of the murderous attacks, Athansios and Eleonora, as well as nurse Faney Tsambazi, were examined but they did not recognize Pagratidis as a perpetrator, the first two because they did not even see the perpetrator, and the second because he could not remember with certainty. Also deposited by the passing soldiers who found the bodies of the victims and his friend but they also did not recognize anybody. The findings of the coroner's autopsy were read in the bodies of Raisis and Paliogiannis, from which three different types of blood were found: the two were identified as those of the victims, and the third (reasonably belonging to the perpetrator) was found to be similar to the type of Pagratidis. (fourth type negative of the killer - fourth positive type Pangratidis). The next day will testify as witnesses of Pagratidis, people from the social environment and then Prof. of Neurology and Psychiatry of the Aristotle University of Thessaloniki Ag. Diakoniannis. According to his words in court, "Pagratidis has been a person with a lot of anomalous character, and he it is perverse, energetic, homosexual, voyeuristic, hangs around thieves, drunkards, and hashish abusers. Of the questions which were submitted to him, he was sure that he did not show psychosis." Diakoniannis' statement was decisive for the future of Pagratidis. The psychiatrist, with all the prestige and respect that his speciality and his course in his society has given, considered that when Pagratidis confessed all the crimes in front of him, he described them in detail by believing the police officers who told him that he would be tortured with some year prison in Kassandreia, made him calmly conscious, spontaneous, and honestly, and without showing that he was just repeating that he had been asked. The next two days will be called upon by several police officers present during Pangratidis' detention days and during the representations made, who of course denied that the confession was based on pressure or deprivation. On 14 February, Pangratidis' lawyers, having faced the refusal of the judges to accept any of their requests, and the continued intervention of the president during the examination of police witnesses, said they could no longer carry out their duties and resigned. The news fell like a bomb since everyone knew that no one could successfully replace the advocates who had been handling the case for two years, and Pagratidis was panicking more than ever. The court appointed new lawyers, interrupted for one day, but when the case was resumed on 16 February, his lawyers returned.

On February 17, in his brother's testimony, Pagratis Pagratidis, a goldsmith by profession, defended his brother. Pangratis Pagratidis "blamed and named as a perpetrator for the crimes Aiada Sklavounos, son of the doctor and University professor, Georgios Sklavounos". According to a pronounced complaint by a letter read in court, Aiada Sklavounos, who had schizophrenia, stayed at that time in the family villa next to the Seikh Sou Forest and was responsible for the murderous attacks of that time. However, the court refused to consider this version as having no direct connection with the trial (the court was considering whether or not Pagratidis was guilty of the specific crimes, and not who the ogre was). Following a series of protests by the defence, - the lack of jurisdiction of the Court of Appeal as the crime of robbery was not proven and the referral of the case to the Assize Court - which was also rejected by the lawyers - once again - resigned by feeling that it was not they can assume responsibility for defending themselves since they lack essential resources to exercise it. The court appointed new lawyers, criminal investigators Gerogiannis and Katsouni, and gave a deadline of February 22 to study the case and prepare their reasons after the evidentiary procedure was over.

On Tuesday, 22 February 1966, and after Pagratidis refused to apologize and give the judges the opportunity to ask him questions, the prosecutor of the head office Michalis Sgouritsas received the floor. The prosecutor pointed out that although he has no doubt that Pagratidis is guilty of the crimes he is accused of, he considers that he should not be subject to the death penalty - a penalty imposed only on persons threatening the security of the country - but to life imprisonment and ten-year deprivation of his political rights. The evidence of the guilt of Pangratidis was considered the murder weapon - the stone - a common element in all crimes, the lack of accusation of the accused, since he could not prove where he was at the time the crimes were committed, and of course the confession of his crimes in front of the psychiatrist, the prosecutor stressed on the occasion that he considered the court to be inappropriate to judge the matter after it had been proved that Pangratidis' motivation was the manslaughter itself and not the robbery, and suggested to the judges that the case be referred to the Assize Court. The reason was followed by the advocates of political education who, of course, demanded his exemplary punishment, and finally, the newly appointed Pangratidis lawyers spoke. The lawyers analyzed all the signs of violations of the prisoner's rights, such as the lack of a lawyer, the effort to identify him with the perpetrator of the previous crimes, the deprivations imposed on him, the ill-treatment he suffered and asked to calculate his young age, and its dependence on drugs as a means of reducing the penalty. The court, after a one-hour meeting, announced that it considers Pangratidis guilty of all crimes, and even points out that they were done in a way particularly horrible by a perpetrator dangerous to public security. After hearing the opinion of the prosecutor and the advocates, he announced the death penalty for each of the robberies and the sentence of the Patrikio and for the attempted robbery against Paleogiannis. He also gave financial compensation to Athanasios Panagioutou as well as to the family of Konstantinos Raisis.

On 25 February 1966, his lawyers appealed the court's decision. The reasons they invoked were:

- The incidents that have been proven in court showed manslaughter rather than robbery as the main purpose of crimes, so the case was for the Assize Court, not the Court of Appeal.
- The filing of the psychiatrist Diakonnis was taken irregularly and should therefore be considered as non-generational, as the doctor can not testify to the audience and be obliged to announce his confidential conversations with his patient.
- The court unlawfully allowed Panagioutou's lawyer to ask questions to the accused in matters unrelated to the client's case.
- Pagratidis was convicted of the attempted robbery of Paliogiannis improperly since the referral order had not attributed him to the accusation.
- His conviction for the attempted robbery against Paliogiannis has not been proven and substantiated in court.

In September 1966, when the council of the Supreme Court met on the case, the appeal was dismissed in all aspects.

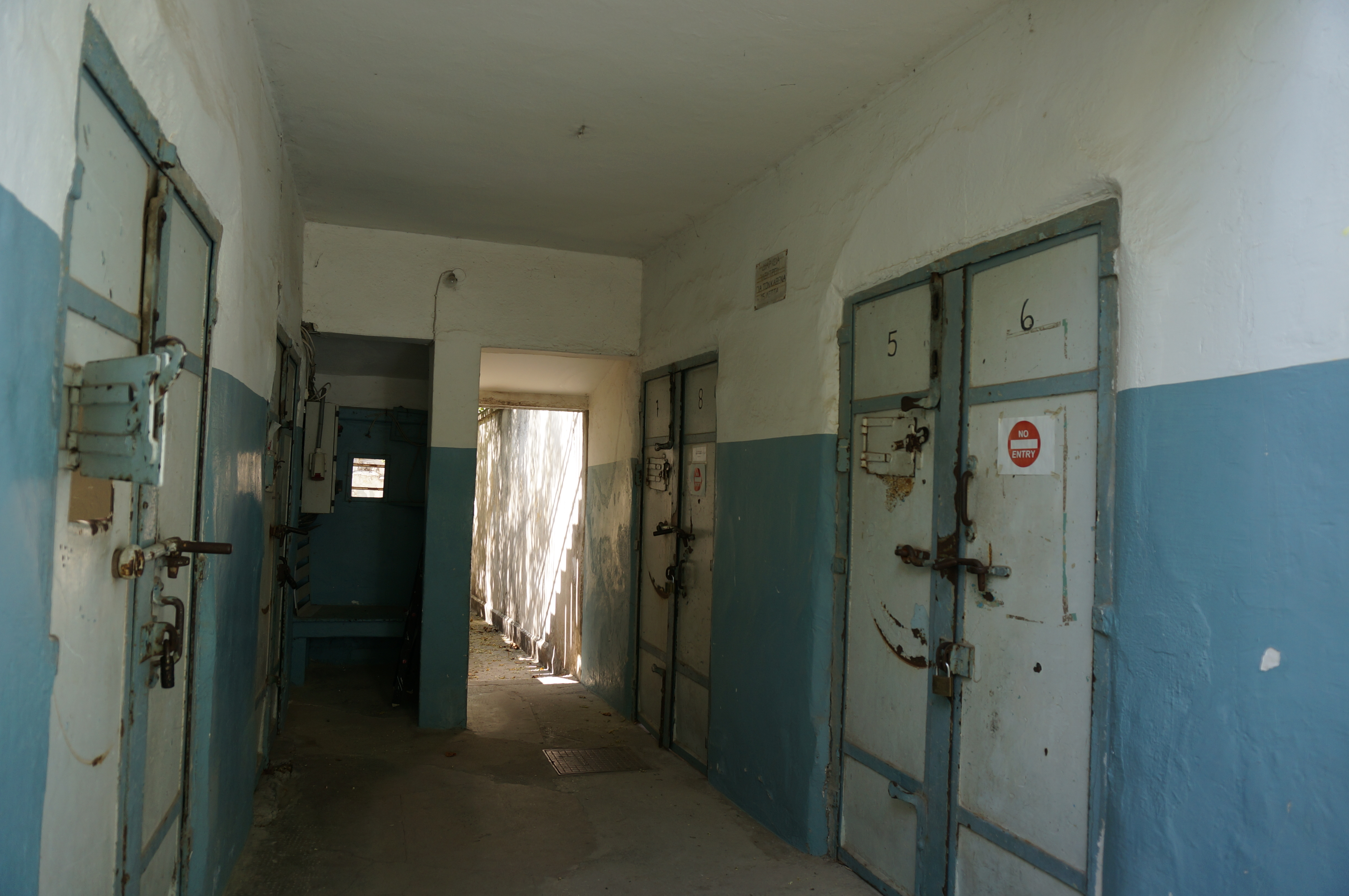
Inside the Heptapyrgion prison

== Execution ==
On 16 February 1968, at 7:05 in the morning, Pagratidis was executed by firing squad on a site in the Seikh Sou forest, near the place where the crimes were committed. Pagratidis himself learned of his impending execution the previous night. When he arrived at the site, and after accepting to tie his eyes, he said shortly before he died: "However, I am innocent. Perhaps one day the culprit will be caught and then.." After the execution, a police patrol took the corpse - and without any notice from his relatives - was buried in the cemetery of the adjacent community of Thessaloniki Exodus, after the funeral. Relatives read the news from the afternoon newspapers.

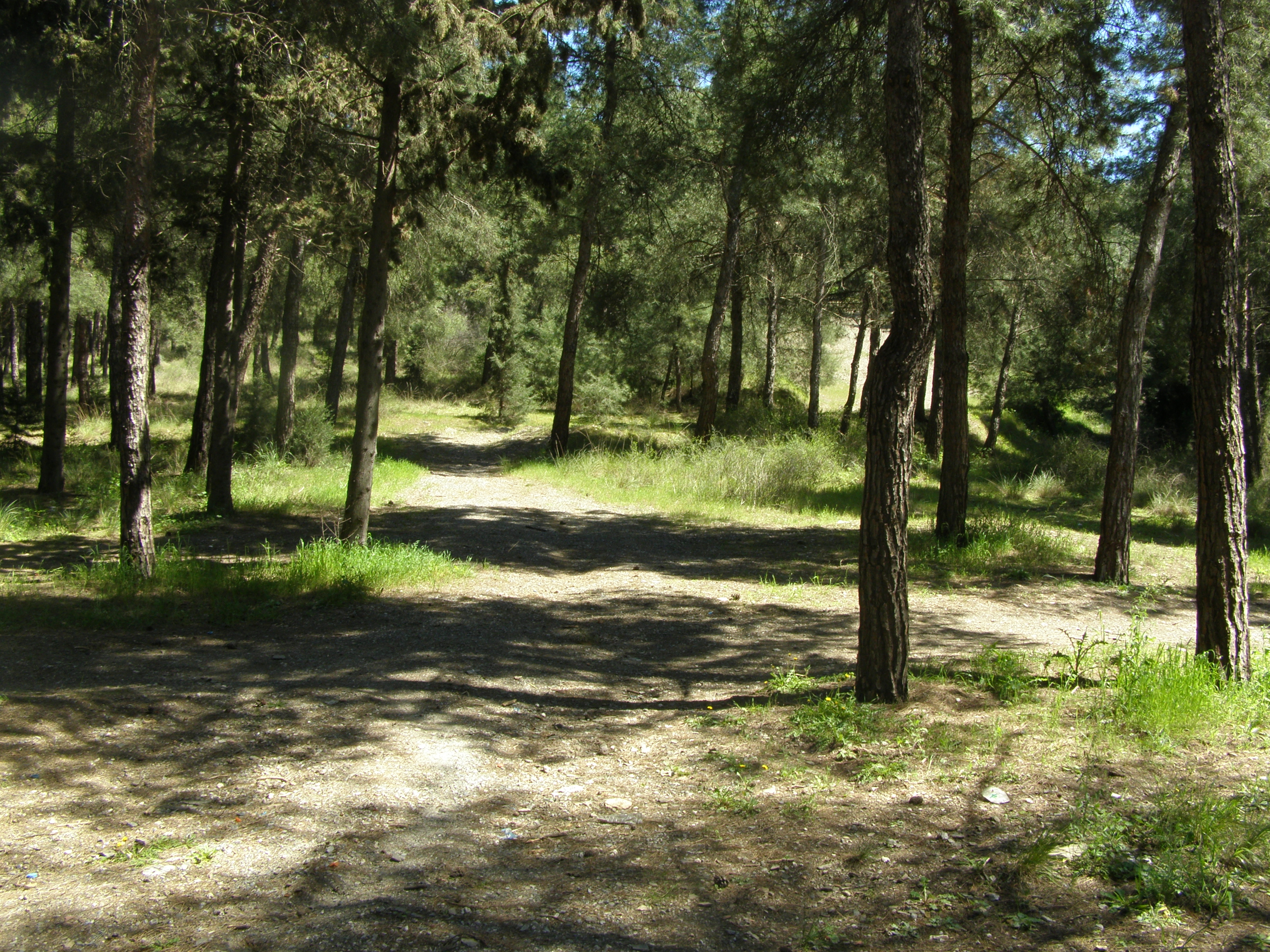
Seikh Sou

== Questionable guilt ==
A journalist from the newspaper "Makedonia", whom followed from the beginning to the end of the case states that "after his arrest, when the data showed that this is the same person who made the 1959 crimes, the security commander N. Tzavaras informed Prosecutor D. Papantoniou that the preliminary investigation of the attack on the orphanage had been completed and he asked him to continue the preliminary investigation, because he "smelled" an ogre.

At that time, prosecutor Nikos Athanasopoulos was sent to the security and the questioning was done only in his presence. Pagratidis, who believed that because of the attack will be tried with extenuating circumstances and will serve his sentence in rural prisons recounted his life, abnormalities and crimes committed with details that no one knows Until then and which coincided with the findings of crimes committed four years ago. Indeed, the prosecutor Athanasopoulos, who is known not to be covered by the police, when the preliminary investigation is over, said: "I am so confident that he is that". The same opinion with the prosecutor was the investigator Kiousis: "I'm 2,000% sure he is," he told reporters. Indeed, there were so many details he had revealed about findings in the crime scene, many of which were not exploited by the police as they believed they were not related to the murders. It is characteristic that for the last attack in the hospital he referred to a button and some small ones he had lost leaving the place, which the police officers could not imagine belonging to the perpetrator. He was certainly the offender of the crimes he was accused of. Those who support the opposite.

The writer Sakis Serefas argues that: "... A local community bastardized along with the police and judiciary put in the middle a little man and devoured him... A punk operated as a pleasure hole for the scum of the city, coming from a family that bled in the Civil War. At the same time, a man-eating local society, the partisan at his daughters, and the police who fought fearlessly at her nails and the judiciary, in turn, smuggled. The question is not whether Pagratidis was innocent or guilty, but that he did not have a fair trial, making his execution criminal".

This view was embraced by writer Thomas Korovinis: "The Thessaloniki era was characterized by a deep state - remnants of security battalions and Organization X - frightening the city with the air of course received from the Security. The "Brooch", which solves and ties, consists of ruffians and crafters who are hurting and doing what they want. Lambrakis' murderers are being bombed. Pagratidis was captured shortly after the murder of the MP and proves to be the ideal case for Security to turn the eyes of the world from a strongly political issue to a social one".

== In the media ==
=== Film ===
- 1989: "Pagratidis' Case: Innocent or Guilty", produced by ERT, based on the book by Kostas Tsarouchas. Directed by Dimitris Arvanitis, screenplay by Yiannis Tziotis, starring Giannis Bezos and Spiros Drosos. The film was presented at the Thessaloniki International Film Festival in the same year.

=== Television ===
- 1989: "Innocent or Guilty", a television series of 7 episodes based on the same book by Kostas Tsarouchas. A new film was produced by the firm.

=== Literature ===
- 2011: "The Round of Death" by Thomas Korovinis, Agra Publishing. Pagratidis' biographical book. The book was awarded the State Fiction Award.

=== Theatre ===
- 2013: "The Round of Death", a theatrical adaptation of the homonymous novel by Thomas Korovinis, directed by Nico Mastorakis from the NTNG.
- 2018: "Aristos", theatrical adaptation of Thomas Korovinis' novel "The Round of Death" as well as evidence from the proceedings of the trial by Theodora Capralou, directed by Giorgos Papageorgiou. The performance was performed at the "New World Theatre".

== See also ==
- List of serial killers by country
