= Vougiouklakis =

Vougiouklakis (Βουγιουκλάκης) or Vougiouklaki (Βουγιουκλάκη) is a Greek surname. Notable people with the surname include:

- Aliki Vougiouklaki (1934–1996), Greek actress and singer
- Takis Vougiouklakis (1939–2021), Greek director
