= Klassiki periptosi vlavis =

Classic situation of malfunction Κλασική περίπτωση βλάβης
- Directed by: Takis Vougiouklakis
- Written by: Takis Vougiouklakis
- Starring: Kostas Tsakonas, Tasos Kostis
- Release date: 1987 (Video)
- Country: Greece
- Language: Greek

Classic situation of malfunction (Greek: Κλασική περίπτωση βλάβης, romanized: Klasikí períptosi vlávis) is a 1987 Greek comedy film, released on video only. It was directed and written by Takis Vougiouklakis. It starred Kostas Tsakonas and Tasos Kostis as two very incompetent repairmen of household appliances.
