= Gia mia houfta touvla =

Gia mia choufta touvla
- Directed by: Takis Vougiouklakis
- Starring: Kostas Tsakonas; Tasos Kostis; Vera Gouma; Kostas Rigopoulos
- Release date: 1987
- Country: Greece
- Language: Greek

Gia mia houfta touvla (Greek: Για μια χούφτα τούβλα) is a 1987 Greek comedy film which was released straight to video. It was written by Manos Venieris and directed by Takis Vougiouklakis and stars Kostas Tsakonas, Tasos Kostis, Vera Gouma and Kostas Rigopoulos.

== Plot ==
The movie tells the adventures of a hard-working tailor Aristos Avramoglou (Kostas Tsakonas) who tries to build a house in his mother's plot in Paiania. He confronts Greece of 1980's: bureaucracy, governmental favors and treacherous neighbors. Thereafter, he discovers that his wife has been cheating on him, with the local tavern-keeper Andronikos (Tasos Kostis), who mortgaged his house, in favor of Aristos to loan from Bank for the construction expenditures.

== Cast ==
- Kostas Tsakonas plays the character Aristos Avramoglou.
- Tasos Kostis plays the character Andronikos.
- Vera Gouma plays the character Toula Avramoglou.
- Kostas Rigopoulos
