= Vicky Harris =

Greek actress

- Βίκυ Χάρρις
- Born: New York
- Occupation: Actress

Vicky Harris (Greek: Βίκυ Χάρρις) is a Greek and American actress, voice-over artist, writer and translator. In film, she is most notable for her roles in See You in Hell, My Darling and The Zero Years by Nikos Nikolaidis.

== Life and career ==
Harris was born in New York and raised in the United States, living between New York City, Boston, Los Angeles, Athens, Greece and Paris, France. She initially aspired to become a writer and while having been granted a four-year scholarship from Boston University, she began her studies in English Literature before developing a career in acting. She then went on to collaborate with some of Greece's most prominent directors, most notably starring in Nikos Nikolaidis' critically acclaimed films See You in Hell, My Darling and The Zero Years for which Variety writes: "Harris dominates with her poised playing: When she's off-screen in the latter stages, the temperature dips."

Known also for her voice-over work in both English and Greek, she has voiced countless commercials, narrations and audio books. Her major credits include dubbing Irène Jacob in English for Theo Angelopoulos' The Dust of Time, providing the Greek voice for both The Other Goose and Tourist in the film Rio (2011), and playing the characters of Bloody Mary and University student in the video game Conspiracies.

Harris continues to write and she regularly works as a translator. She is a member of the Hellenic Film Academy.

== Filmography ==
Vicky Harris film and television work
| Title | Year | Role | Notes |
|---|---|---|---|
| The Wing of the Fly | 1995 | Aliki | |
| Akropol | 1996 | Onassis' girlfriend | |
| Prive | 1996 | Anna | |
| See You in Hell, My Darling | 1999 | Elsa | |
| Time Crashes Against the Wall | 2000 | Anna | |
| In the Shadow of Lemme Caution | 2002 | Katia | |
| Sentinels of Darkness | 2002 | Paige | |
| .com for Murder | 2002 | Julie | |
| Conspiracies (video game) | 2004 | Bloody Mary (voice), University Student (voice) | Video Game |
| One Night One Life | 2005 | Anna | |
| The Zero Years | 2005 | Vicky | |
| Without | 2008 | Friend 3 | |
| Rio (Greek version) | 2011 | Other Goose (voice), Tourist (voice) | Animated |
| Directing Hell | 2011 | Self | Documentary |
| Medea, Louder Than My Thoughts | 2014 | Self | Documentary |
