= Ntanta gia oles tis douleies =

- Genre: Comedy
- Written by: Rena Rigga
- Directed by: Errikos Andreou
- Starring: Panos Michalopoulos; Marianna Toumasatou; Alexandra Pavlidou; Nefeli Orfanou; Christina Varzopoulou
- Country of origin: Greece
- Original language: Greek
- No. of seasons: 1
- No. of episodes: 35

Production
- Executive producer: Thodoris Kontos
- Production locations: Studio Kapa, Athens, Greece
- Camera setup: Multi-camera
- Running time: 25-30 minutes
- Production company: TV Epsilon

Original release
- Network: ANT1
- Release: October 8, 1998 – June 17, 1999

Ntanta gia oles tis douleies (English: Nanny for all jobs) is a Greek comedy television series and aired on ANT1 during the 1998–1999 season.

== Plot ==
Alexandros Papastavrou is a gynecologist, a widower with three children and engaged to another gynecologist, Julia Lembesis. Alexandros meets Nana Eilikrini, whom he tries to tolerate, because she is the nanny of his children. It is obvious that this relationship cannot develop into a bond. But as time goes on, the day when Nana will leave home and Alexandros will find another nanny grows longer. Love is now very close to them. In order for both of them to exorcise the... evil, Alexandros is preparing to marry Julia and Nana to Sotiris, her former lover, who has never stopped besieging her. However, the children have their own logic and are not willing to let their father marry.

== Cast ==
- Panos Michalopoulos as Alexandros Papastavrou
- Marianna Toumasatou as Nana Ilikrini
- Alexandra Pavlidou as Tzoulia Lempesi
- Nefeli Orfanou as Lili Lempesi
- Christina Varzopoulou as Ntina Ilikrini
- Thodoros Syriotis as Leonidas Lempesis
- Themis Makrygianni as Ioli Papastavrou
- Maria Stavari as Nefeli Papastavrou
- Panos Sapounakis as Orestis Papastavrou
- Stelios Kalathas as Sotiris
- Venetia Chatzinikolaou as Christina
