= I ora i kali =

- Genre: Family; Comedy
- Created by: Panos Amarantidis
- Written by: Panos Amarantidis
- Directed by: Antonis Tempos (1-2 season); Makis Petropoulos (3 season)
- Starring: Panos Michalopoulos; Mpesi Malfa; Zeta Douka; Rika Dialyna; Karmen Rouggeri
- Theme music composer: Giannis Makridis
- Country of origin: Greece
- Original language: Greek
- No. of seasons: 3
- No. of episodes: 94

Production
- Executive producers: Faidra Manousakidou; Rania Pegiazi; Giorgos Lyggris
- Producer: Giannis Karagiannis
- Production locations: Athens, Greece
- Camera setup: Multi-camera
- Running time: 41-49 minutes
- Production company: JK Productions

Original release
- Network: Mega Channel
- Release: September 30, 2004 – June 21, 2007

I ora i kali (English: The Good Time) is a Greek family comedy series that aired on Mega Channel during the 2004–2007 seasons. The script was written by Panos Amarantidis, while the direction was taken by Antonis Tempos and Makis Petropoulos.

== Plot ==
Stefanos, a naval officer, is preparing to go on a trip and gives instructions to his children, Themis and Christina, who live, after his divorce, with their mother Pitsa, who has set her life's goal to remarry him. Sofia, a philologist, is preparing her thesis with the goal of a doctorate and an academic career. Her younger sister Jenny, a keen businesswoman, is preparing for the inauguration of her new lingerie boutique in the center of Athens with the help of their wealthy and worldly mother Natalie. Stefanos' postponement of the trip, a chance meeting and the choice of Sofia as his children's private tutor will unite these people and lead them into incredible entanglements and uncontrollable situations.

== Cast ==
- Panos Michalopoulos as Stefanos Fotiadis
- Mpesi Malfa as Sofia Epitropoulou
- Zeta Douka as Tzeni Epitropoulou
- Rika Dialyna as Natali Epitropoulou
- Karmen Rouggeri as Pitsa Fotiadi
- Iro Loupi as Eleni Charalampidou
- Natalia Lionaki as Danai "Marina" Kriezi
- Dimitris Kallivokas as Iason Chatzidoukas
- Giorgos Konstantis as Thodoros Portokalis
- Mairi Razi as Soultana
- Arietta Moutousi as Mairi McParton
- Eleni Karakasi as Roza
- Tzeni Diagoupi as Anastasia Mpalaoura
- Faidra Drouka as Nafsika
- Alexandra Ousta as Christina Fotiadi
- Thodoris Petropoulos as Themis Fotiadis
- Zoi Rigopoulou as Kassiani
