= Tsakonas =

Tsakonas (Greek: Τσάκωνας) is a surname of Greek origin. Notable people with the surname include:

- Kostas Tsakonas (1943–2015), Greek actor
- Lykourgos-Stefanos Tsakonas (born 1990), Greek sprinter

== See also ==
- Tsakonians
