= Athena Michailidou (Greek actress) =

Greek actress (1918–2001)

- Born: Athens, Greece
- Died: 9 December 2001 (aged 82–83)
- Occupation: Actress
- Years active: 1958–1982

Athena Michailidou (Greek: Αθηνά Μιχαηλίδου, 1918 – 9 December 2001) was a Greek actress. She appeared in more than thirty films from 1958 to 1982.

== Selected filmography ==
Year	Title	Role	Notes
1962	Law 4000	Mrs. Anagnostou	
1958	A Matter of Dignity	Roxanni Pella	
