= Tasos Kostis =

Greek actor

- Born: 14 January 1951 (age 75); Keratsini, Greece
- Occupation: Actor
- Years active: 1980–present
- Height: 1.88
- Relatives: Giannis Bezos (cousin)

Tasos Kostis (Greek: Τάσος Κωστής; born 14 January 1951) is a Greek film and voice actor. He appeared in more than sixty films since 1980. He's also participated in many dubs.

== Early and personal life ==
As of 2024, Kostis resides in Nicosia, Cyprus.

== Selected filmography ==
Year	Title	Role	Notes
2008	O Ilias tou 16ou		
1987	Klassiki periptosi vlavis		
1987	Gia mia houfta touvla		

== Filmography ==
=== Television ===
Year	Title	Role(s)	Notes
1999–2000	The Shine	Imre	Lead role / 200 episodes
2000	The Optimal Aristotelis	director	3 episodes
2000–2001	Ιt's your fault	Anestis	Lead role / 31 episodes
2001	One and One		3 episodes
2001	The Love Boat		1 episode
2001–2002	Very family friendly	Thanasis Ignatiadis	5 episodes
2002–2003	Under the Acropolis		Lead role / 100 episodes
2004	The knives	Mitsos	
2004–2005	Telebora		Lead role / 32 episodes
2005	Silk velvet	Pavlos Rigopoulos	1 episode
2005	Marriage with all that		Episode: "
2006	Seven Deadly Mothers-in-law	Kostas	Episode: "The Feminist Mother-in-law"
2006	The Red Suite	Jordan	Episode: "Vangelis' debt"
2006	Loafing and Camouflage: The Series	Minas Katsabelas	1 episode
2006–2007	Fifty Fifty	Thanasis Papadopoulos	6 episodes
2006–2008	The Ugly Maria	Heracles Papasotiriou	Lead role / 301 episodes
2008	No one catches us!	Stelios	3 episodes
2008	I have a secret	Alekos Sakellarios	2 episodes
2009	Karyotakis	mister general	4 episodes
2009–2010	Lakis a soft guy	Kyriakos Perivolaris	10 episodes
2010	The Harmful Family	Panagiotis Zarogiannis	1 episode
2010	Seven Deadly Mothers-in-law	Zarza	Episode: "The Mother-in-law of 1821"
2015–2016	Crazy Family	Yiannis Alantzas	Lead role / 53 episodes
2016–2017	Brousko	Charidimos Tzoutzourakis	Recurring role / 193 episodes
2020–2023	Greetings to Platanos	Charalambis Ananiadis	Lead role

== Dub of TV shows ==
Year	Title	Role	Notes
1985–1990	Inspector Gadget	Inspector Gadget	Original ERT/VHS/Mega Channel dub
1989	Looney Tunes	Daffy Duck and Sylvester the Cat	
1990	Mickey Mouse short films	Goofy	
1990	Goofy short films	Goofy	
1993	X-Men: The Animated Series	Wolverine	Seasons 2–5, Star Channel dub
1993	X-Men: The Animated Series	Cyclops	Season 2, Star Channel dub
1993	X-Men: The Animated Series	Gambit	Seasons 3–5, Star Channel dub
1993	TaleSpin	Baloo	
1994	Goof Troop	Goofy	
1996	Batman: The Animated Series	Additional Voices	VHS dub
1996–1998	Spider-Man: The Animated Series	Dr. Curt Connors (Lizard)	Seasons 1–4
1996–1998	Spider-Man: The Animated Series	J. Jonah Jameson	Seasons 1–4
1996–1998	Spider-Man: The Animated Series	Kingpin	Seasons 1–4
1996–1998	Spider-Man: The Animated Series	Hydro-Man	Seasons 1–4
1996–1998	Spider-Man: The Animated Series	Dormammu	Seasons 1–4
1997	Timon & Pumbaa	Pumbaa	
2000	Transformers: Robots in Disguise (2001)	Optimus Prime	
2000	Transformers: Robots in Disguise (2001)	Gas Skunk	
2000	Transformers: Beast Machines	Optimus Primal	
2000	Arthur	David Read, Alan Powers (Brain), Mr. Ratburn, Binky Barnes, Grandpa Dave, Principal Haney, additional voices	Star Channel dub
2000	Mickey Mouse Works	Goofy	
2000	The Smurfs	Gargamel/Grandpa Smurf	Star Channel dub
2000	Bob the Builder	Lofty the Crane, Roley the Steamroller, Travis the Tractor, and Additional Voices	
2001–2005	House of Mouse	Goofy, Horace Horsecollar, Captain Hook, Pumbaa, Cogsworth, The Mad Hatter, Eeyore, Beast, Zeke Wolf, Jafar, Hades, Zeus, and Narrator	
2002	Justice League	Martian Manhunter, Green Lantern, additional voices	
2002	The Legend of Tarzan	Tantor, Samuel Philander, Kerchak	
2003	Baby Looney Tunes	Baby Daffy	
2004	Spider-Man Unlimited	Mr. Meugniot, X-51, Carnage, Sir Ram	
2004	Superman: The Animated Series	Professor Hamilton	
2004	The New Adventures of Winnie the Pooh	Gopher	DVD dub
2005	Sylvester & Tweety Mysteries	Sylvester	
2006	Duck Dodgers	Duck Dodgers	
2006	Mickey Mouse Clubhouse	Goofy	
2013	Mickey Mouse (2013)	Goofy	
2013	The Looney Tunes Show	Daffy Duck, Sylvester	
