= Singapore Sling (1990 film) =

Singapore Sling: The Man Who Loved a Corpse
- Theatrical release poster
- Singapore Sling: Ο Άνθρωπος που Αγάπησε ένα Πτώμα
- Directed by: Nikos Nikolaidis
- Written by: Nikos Nikolaidis
- Produced by: Marie-Louise Bartholomew
- Starring: Meredyth Herold; Panos Thanassoulis; Michele Valley
- Cinematography: Aris Stavrou
- Edited by: Andreas Andreadakis
- Music by: Sergei Rachmaninoff; Giaches de Wert; Glenn Miller; Julie London
- Production companies: Marni Film; Cinekip; Greek Film Center
- Distributed by: Greek Film Center
- Release dates: 13 September 1990 (Toronto International Film Festival); October 1990 (Thessaloniki Festival of Greek Cinema)
- Running time: 111 minutes
- Country: Greece
- Languages: English; Greek; French

Singapore Sling: The Man Who Loved a Corpse (Greek: Singapore Sling: Ο Άνθρωπος που Αγάπησε ένα Πτώμα, tr. Singapore Sling: O Ánthropos pou Agápise éna Ptóma) is a 1990 Greek black and white horror underground art film directed by Nikos Nikolaidis and regarded as his magnum opus. Considered a difficult film to label while still managing to develop something of a cult following throughout the years nonetheless, it was shot in a bizarre manner somewhat resembling film noir or neo-noir and black comedy as well as the exploitation, thriller, and crime genres mixed with some elements of eroticism and horror with sex being used as a power game. It received a theatrical release in Greece on 6 December 1990.

Although Nikolaidis had worked as a film director in his home country since the early 1960s, he was almost entirely unknown outside Greece. It was only with this film, which immediately achieved cult status, that international fame came to him; it remains the film for which he is best known. In March 2024, Vinegar Syndrome released the film on Blu-ray. The film was officially selected for screening at the Rimini Film Festival.

== Plot ==
A mother and a (grown) daughter live together in a secluded mansion. They spend their days playing perverse BDSM-related incestuous games in memory of their sadistic patriarch who, when he was still alive, raped his daughter when she was eleven, murdered several servants, and is now a mummified corpse with which the daughter is shown having sex. They occasionally kill their servants and bury their bodies in the garden.

When first glimpsed, the psychotic mother-daughter protagonists, half-dressed, are burying their disemboweled chauffeur in a pit they have dug in their backyard on a night with thunder and heavy rain. They lay down their shovels and drag his fresh corpse out of the bushes. He was killed in one of their usual games combining incestuous sex with murder. Shortly after this and at first unnoticed by the two women, a lovesick detective pulls his car up to the residence. He is suffering from a painful bullet wound and an equally painful yearning to track down Laura, his beloved for whom he has been searching for three years and who is known to have visited the area. It is revealed that the daughter is physically very similar to Laura.

The duo takes the detective, who suspects them to be responsible for Laura's kidnapping, into their home. As the exhausted detective is silent, the two women christen him 'Singapore Sling', after a cocktail recipe they discover in his pocket notebook. They use him as a pawn in their sexual roleplay games and their perverse entertainment, during which Singapore Sling, now a prisoner, is tied up, chained to a bed, vomited on, electrocuted, used as a sex slave, and subjected to other forms of torture and atrocities in which he is forced to participate. However, as Singapore Sling's confinement wears on he regains his strength and takes a more active role in the games. His deranged captors become concerned and alarmed when a sharp kitchen knife, belonging to the late father, goes missing and they discover Singapore Sling digging a deep hole in their backyard. They recognize that a killing is imminent.

A few days later, the daughter decides that she is fed up with having to suffer under the yoke of maternal authority, and, together with Singapore Sling, murders her mother. Singapore Sling then takes what up until now used to be the mother's role in the sexual games. However, during one of these games, a reenactment of Laura's murder, he stabs the daughter, playing Laura, with the aforementioned missing kitchen knife now attached to his penis. The daughter, while bleeding to death, shoots Singapore Sling and then he goes out to the garden and falls into the pit which he himself had recently dug. The film ends with all three characters dead.

== Cast ==
- Meredyth Herold as Daughter
- Panos Thanassoulis as Detective Singapore Sling
- Michele Valley as Mother

== Reception ==
Of the film's reception, Nikolaidis said: "When I was shooting Singapore Sling, I was under the impression that I was making a comedy with elements taken from Ancient Greek Tragedy... Later, when some European and American critics characterized it as 'one of the most disturbing films of all times,' I started to feel that something was wrong with me. Then, when British censors banned its release in England, I finally realized that something is wrong with all of us."

=== Accolades ===
Event	Category	Winner or Nominee	Won
Amsterdam Fantastic Film Festival (April 1991)	Grand Prize of European Fantasy Film in Gold	Nikos Nikolaidis	No
Brussels International Fantastic Film Festival (March 1991)	Golden Raven	Nikos Nikolaidis	No
Thessaloniki Festival of Greek Cinema (October 1990)	Best Director Award	Nikos Nikolaidis	Yes
Thessaloniki Festival of Greek Cinema (October 1990)	Best Quality Film Award	Nikos Nikolaidis	Yes
Thessaloniki Festival of Greek Cinema (October 1990)	Best Actress Award	Meredyth Herold	Yes
Thessaloniki Festival of Greek Cinema (October 1990)	Best Cinematographer Award	Aris Stavrou	Yes
Thessaloniki Festival of Greek Cinema (October 1990)	Best Art Director Award	Marie-Louise Bartholomew	Yes
Thessaloniki Festival of Greek Cinema (October 1990)	Best Editor Award	Andreas Andreadakis	Yes
Toronto International Film Festival (September 1991)	International Critics' Award	Nikos Nikolaidis	No

== Legacy ==
The Icelandic neo-psychedelia band Singapore Sling is named after the film. As the band's frontman Henrik Björnsson explained in a June 2003 interview with Belgium's VRT Radio 1: "We had a first gig. It was booked and we didn't have a name and I had been looking for a film called Singapore Sling for a long time. I couldn't find it anywhere. It sounded cool, so that became the name of the band. It's some kind of dark, perverse Greek film from 1990. I haven't found it yet, so if you know someone who has it, please let me know. I hope it's good. A dark perverse noir film and a guy who has sex with a corpse. And he's called Singapore Sling." In November 2005, after the completion of his last film The Zero Years, a tale of perversion and sexual dominance which failed to replicate the earlier success of Singapore Sling, Nikolaidis declared his intention to stop making movies in order to deal with music.
