= Meredyth Herold =

Greek-American actress

- Citizenship: Greece
- Occupations: film and television actress
- Known for: Singapore Sling (1990)

Meredyth Herold (Greek: Μέρεντιθ Χέρολντ) is a Greek film and television actress best known for Singapore Sling (1990), To spiti stin exohi (1994) and To koritsi me tis valitses (1997).

As of 2011, she lived in the United States.

== Awards ==
- Thessaloniki International Film Festival: Best Actress
