= The Loser Takes It All =

- Theatrical release poster
- Ο χαμένος τα παίρνει όλα
- Directed by: Nikos Nikolaidis
- Written by: Nikos Nikolaidis
- Produced by: Nikos Nikolaidis
- Starring: Giannis Aggelakas; Simeon Nikolaidis; Jenny Kitseli; Ifigenia Asteriadi; Louise Attah; Ioanna Pappa; Savva Loumi; Melissa Stoili; Maro Mavri; Christos Houliaras; George Houliaras; Kostas Katsikis; Dimitris Katsimanis; Themis Katz; Stefanos Lazarinos; Grigoris Pimenidis; Notis Pitsilos; Takis Tsagaris; Michele Valley
- Cinematography: Kostas Gikas
- Edited by: Giorgos Triandafyllou
- Music by: Giannis Aggelakas; Simeon Nikolaidis
- Production companies: Greek Film Center; Greek Television ET-1
- Distributed by: Greek Film Center; Greek Television ET-1; Prooptiki
- Release date: 15 November 2002 (Thessaloniki International Film Festival)
- Running time: 120 Minutes
- Country: Greece
- Language: Greek
- Budget: ₯ 280,000,000

The Loser Takes It All (Greek: Ο χαμένος τα παίρνει όλα, romanized: O chamenos ta pairnei ola) is a 2002 Greek dramatic experimental independent underground art film, the seventh feature film directed by Nikos Nikolaidis. The film, produced by the Greek Film Center and Greek Television ET-1, is the last part of the "Years of Cholera" trilogy beginning with The Wretches Are Still Singing (1979) and Sweet Bunch (1983) which deals with the last decades of the twentieth century. Production of the film was finished by September 2002. The film was first screened at the Thessaloniki International Film Festival on 15 November 2002 and its theatrical release began on 31 January 2003. The film received the Best Director Award and Kostas Gikas received the Best Cinematographer Award for it at the Thessaloniki International Film Festival's Greek State Film Awards in November 2002.

== Plot ==
The story revolves around five characters: a fortysomething, the "Man," who has memories from the "years of cholera;" an alcoholic woman, Odetti, who goes by the pseudonym of "Madame Raspberry;" a Senegalese stripper named Mandali; the "Little Guy," a guitar player and music lover; and Elsa, the protagonist's ex-girlfriend who is now a barwoman. The characters meet in order to fulfill their longstanding dream: leaving the city for an exotic island on a journey of no return. Thus they get involved with the dark world of the night.

== Crew ==
- Director and Writer: Nikos Nikolaidis
- Producer: Nikos Nikolaidis
- Music and Soundtrack: Giannis Aggelakas and Simeon Nikolaidis
- Cinematographer: Kostas Gikas
- Editor: Giorgos Triandafyllou
- Set Decorator and Costume Designer: Marie-Louise Bartholomew
- Makeup Artist: Katerina Oikonomidoy
- Sound: Antonis Samaras
- Sound Re-Recording Mixer: Kostas Varybopiotis

== Cast ==
- Giannis Aggelakas as Man
- Simeon Nikolaidis as Little Guy
- Jenny Kitseli as Odetti
- Ifigenia Asteriadi as Elsa
- Louise Attah as Mandali
- Ioanna Pappa as Melissa
- Savva Loumi as Blonde
- Melissa Stoili as Agni
- Maro Mavri as Television Woman
- Christos Houliaras as Cameraman
- George Houliaras as First Dealer
- Kostas Katsikis
- Dimitris Katsimanis as Short Guy
- Themis Katz as Second Dealer
- Stefanos Lazarinos as Third Dealer
- Grigoris Pimenidis as Detective
- Notis Pitsilos as Pawnbroker
- Takis Tsagaris as "El Dorado" Boss
- Michele Valley as Dead Mother

== Soundtrack ==
The film's soundtrack contains the following songs:

- "It's a Wonderful World" by Simeon Nikolaidis
- "Space in Time" by Simeon Nikolaidis
- "Into Town" by Simeon Nikolaidis

The soundtrack was released in 2003 by the company Hitch Hyke Records and includes twenty-eight pieces (mostly instrumental), including the song "The Loser Takes It All" (Greek: «Ο χαμένος τα παίρνει όλα,» tr. "O chamenos ta pairnei ola") sung by Giannis Aggelakas. It was later reissued by Aggelakas' record label All Together Now.
