= Anna Mantzourani =

Greek actress

Anna Matzourani
- Born: 28 May 1935; Athens, Greece
- Died: 9 January 1991 (aged 55); Athens, Greece
- Occupation: Actress
- Years active: 1958-1989
- Spouse(s): Takis Vavalis (divorced) Antonis Karatzopoulos
- Children: 1

Anna Matzourani (Greek: Άννα Μαντζουράνη; 28 May 1935 – 9 January 1991) was a Greek actress. She was born in Athens and she appeared in more than forty films from 1958 to 1989.

== Selected filmography ==
Year	Title	Role	Notes
1959	Maiden's Cheek		
1961	To exypno pouli	Nitsa	
1969	O Stratis parastratise		
1981	Learn How to Read and Write, Son		
