= Giannis Aggelakas =

Greek singer, songwriter, and poet

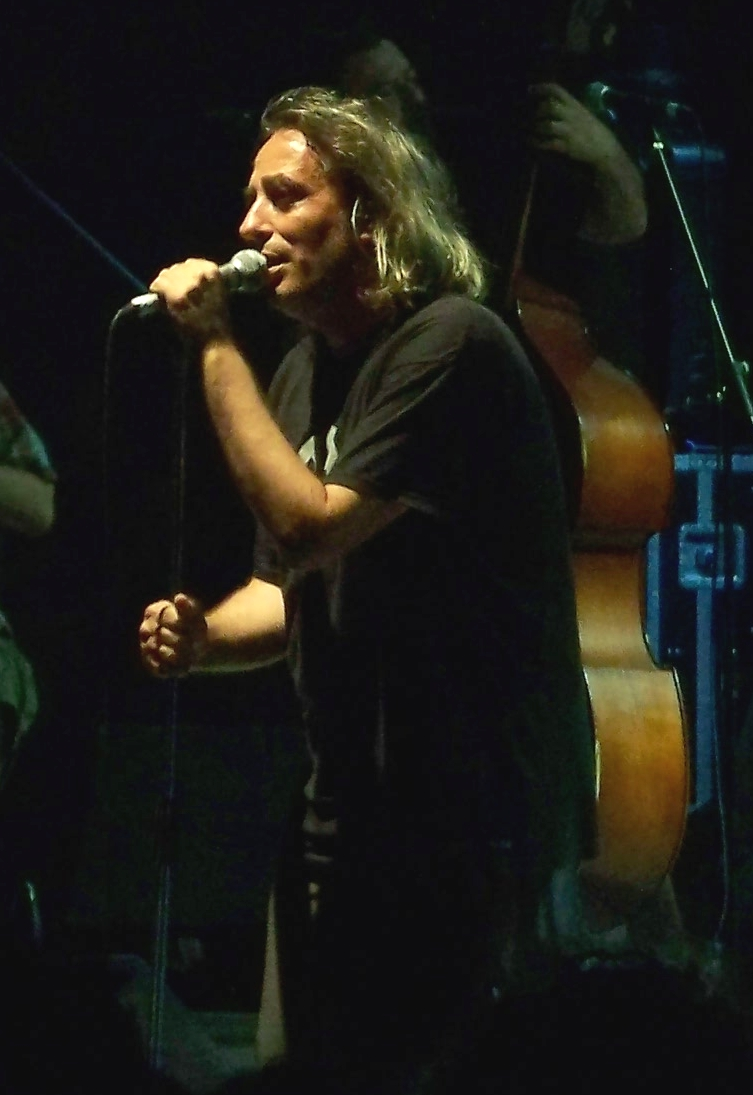
- Aggelakas performing live at Schoolwave 2007 fest

Background information
- Born: 30 October 1959 (age 66); Thessaloniki, Greece
- Genres: Post-punk, experimental rock
- Occupation: Singer-songwriter
- Instruments: Vocals, guitar
- Years active: 1983–present
- Label: All Together Now
- Website: http://www.alltogethernow.gr

Giannis Aggelakas (Greek: Γιάννης Αγγελάκας; born 1959) is a Greek singer, songwriter, and poet. Best known as the former lead singer of the Greek rock band Trypes, he has maintained a productive solo career since 2000, having experimented with Greek folk music and collaborated with artists like Thanassis Papakonstantinou and Psarantonis. From 2004 onwards, he has maintained his own record label, All Together Now, releasing his personal albums through it.

== Discography ==
- 1993 Υπέροχο τίποτα (Beautiful Nothing), (Virgin)
- 2000 Χώμα & νερό (Earth & Water)
- 2003 Ο χαμένος τα παίρνει όλα (The Loser Takes It All) (soundtrack), Hitch Hyke Records, All Together Now (reissue)
- 2005 Οι ανάσες των λύκων (The Breaths of the wolves), All Together Now
- 2005 Από 'δω και πάνω (From now on), All Together Now
- 2007 Πότε θα φτάσουμε εδώ (When are we getting here), All Together Now
- 2009 Ψυχή Βαθιά (Soul Deep), (soundtrack) All Together Now
- 2013 Η Γελαστή Ανηφόρα (The smiling uphill), All Together Now
- 2016 Ήσυχα Τραγούδια για ανέμελα λιβάδια (quiet songs for pleasant meadows)
