= An itan to violi pouli =

An itan to violi pouli Αν ήταν το βιολί πουλί
- Directed by: Takis Vougiouklakis
- Produced by: Lakis Mihailidis
- Starring: Sotiris Moustakas; Giannis Mihalopoulos; Giannis Vogiatzis
- Distributed by: Damaskinos-Mihailidis
- Release date: 1984
- Running time: 95 minutes
- Country: Greece
- Language: Greek

An itan to violi pouli (Greek: Αν ήταν το βιολί πουλί - If violin was a willie), alternative title Kai aftos to violi tou (Greek: Και αυτός το βιολί του - And yet he keeps going) is a 1984 Greek comedy film that was directed by Takis Vougiouklakis and produced by Lakis Mihalidis, starring Sotiris Moustakas.

== Plot ==
Lefteris Paganinakis, a word play on Paganini, is thrown in jail after becoming involved in a brawl caused by two rival priests who are quarrelling over who gets to use Lefteris' orchestra as an attraction for churchgoers. While in prison, he relates his life's story to a fellow inmate. It is revealed that Lefteris had three weddings which all ended up in divorce proceedings presided over by the same judge. Other details of his adventures and tribulations are unfurled during this narration, along with certain aspects of prison life. But two pleasant surprises await him. One of the two priests visits him in jail with an offer, and the clerical rivalry is rekindled. Meanwhile, the judge advises Lefteris on how to circumvent legal restrictions on matrimony.

== Cast ==
- Sotiris Moustakas .... Lefteris Paganinakis
- Giannis Mihalopoulos .... Divorce Judge
- Giannis Vogiatzis .... Inmate Vlassis Boukas
- Thanos Papadopoulos .... Papa-Fotis (Priest #1)
- Kostas Makedos .... Papa-Giorgis (Priest #2)
- Kostas Palios .... Doctor Thanos Tsoukantas
- Stella Konstantinou .... Evgenia Paganinaki
- Vina Askini .... Anna Tsourapidi - Paganinaki
- Athina Mavrommati .... Maria Paganinaki
