= Marinos Kontaras =

- Directed by: George Tzavellas
- Written by: George Tzavellas
- Produced by: Maria Plyta
- Starring: Manos Katrakis; Vasilis Diamantopoulos; Petros Giannakos; Billy Konstadopoulou
- Cinematography: Iasson Novak
- Edited by: Giorgos Tsaoulis
- Release date: March 15, 1948
- Running time: 80 minutes
- Country: Greece
- Language: Greek

Marinos Kontaras (Greek: Μαρίνος Κοντάρας), also known as The Corsair of the Aegean, is a 1948 Greek film written and directed by George Tzavellas, adapted from a short story of Argyris Eftaliotis. It was the first Greek film to be selected in an international festival (Experimental Film festival of Knokke-Heist).

== Plot ==
Marinos Kontaras (Manos Katrakis) is a pirate in the Aegean who falls in love with Lemoni and abducts her. She demands that he forswear piracy. He accepts and reconciles with his enemies, including the brother of Lemoni (Vasilis Diamantopoulos).
