= The Kopanoi =

- Directed by: Giorgos Konstadinou
- Written by: Giorgos Konstadinou
- Starring: Giorgos Konstadinou; Markos Lezes; Yannis Vouros
- Cinematography: Vassilis Christomoglou
- Edited by: Kostas Raftopoulos; George Triantafyllou
- Music by: Giorgos Katsaros
- Release date: 21 October 1987
- Running time: 85 minutes
- Country: Greece
- Language: Greek

The Kopanoi (Greek: «Οι Κοπανοι», lit. The Jerks) is a 1987 Greek heist comedy film written and directed by Giorgos Konstadinou and starring Konstadinou, Markos Lezes, Yannis Vouros, Kostas Palios, and Giorgos Petrohilos. In retrospective coverage, the film has been described as a cult classic of 1980s Greek cinema.

== Cast ==
- Giorgos Konstadinou as Leonidas
- Markos Lezes as Toufas
- Yannis Vouros as Mickey
- Kostas Palios as Doukas
- Giorgos Petrohilos as Gogo
- Kostas Carageorgis as Babis
- Tasos Psomopoulos as Vlasis
- Kostas Makedos as Fouskas
- Frini Arvaniti as Frosso
- Dimitris Vasmatzis as Lahtaras
- Michalis Arsenis as Funeral office owner
- Linda Giga as Liana
- Sia Faraki as Vanessa
- Dimitris Banos as Director of bank
- Kostis Malkotsis as Gambler

=== Main characters ===
- Leonidas (Giorgos Konstadinou) is the main character of the movie. A real life loser, he awaits orders from his boss (Babis) about his next plan regarding a bank robbery. He must assemble a "gang" to do the job, only to prove later in the film that they are not even able to close a single casket...
- Toufas (Markos Lezes) is a black belt martial art master, who got beaten really bad the last time he worked with Leonidas for Babis. He is not excited with the idea of robbing a bank, though he will eventually join the "gang" reluctantly.
- Mickey (Yannis Vouros) is a thief. He specializes in motor vehicle theft. Leonidas is a keen admirer of his abilities, mostly because Mickey has never spent a single day in prison. He wastes most of his time hanging out in discothèques.
- Doukas (Kostas Palios) is a gambler. A true gentleman who spends all of his day playing cards, and thus easy to be located. He always leaves the table having won by cheating. His bodyguard, Fouskas (see below), holds a key role in the film.
- Gogo (Giorgos Petrohilos) is Mickey's friend from the discothèque. Despite not being included in Leonidas's list at first, he will eventually join the "gang" and agrees to take a share from the bank robbery.
- Fouskas (Kostas Makedos) is the fat bodyguard working for Doukas. He gets beaten early in the film by three angry gamblers. Later he represents Doukas during the bank robbery and tries unsuccessfully to take the money.
