= See You in Hell, My Darling =

- Theatrical release poster
- Θα σε Δω στην Κόλαση Αγάπη μου
- Directed by: Nikos Nikolaidis
- Written by: Nikos Nikolaidis
- Produced by: Nikos Nikolaidis
- Starring: Vicky Harris; Valeria Christodoulidou; Paschalis Tsarouhas; Nikos Kordinos; Panos Vourlamis
- Cinematography: Giorgos Argyroiliopoulos
- Edited by: Giorgos Triandafyllou
- Music by: Nikos Touliatos
- Production companies: Greek Film Center; Greek Television ET-1
- Distributed by: Restless Wind
- Release date: 20 November 1999 (Thessaloniki)
- Running time: 108 minutes
- Country: Greece
- Language: Greek

See You in Hell, My Darling (Greek: Θα σε Δω στην Κόλαση Αγάπη μου, romanized: Tha se Do stin Kolasi Agapi mou) is a 1999 Greek experimental underground art film written, produced, and directed by Nikos Nikolaidis, and starring Vicky Harris, Valeria Christodoulidou, Paschalis Tsarouhas, Nikos Kordinos, and Panos Vourlamis. The plot follows three lovers, who—in a devious and gruesome manner—try to destroy each other, in order to gain solitary entrance to Hell.

The film was officially selected for screening at the Brussels International Film Festival in January 1999, where it was nominated for the Crystal Star and at the Chicago International Film Festival in October 1999, where it was nominated for the Gold Hugo.

== Plot ==
The film is about a pair of women, Vera and Elsa, who rob a van with Elsa's husband. The women are in love with the same man and are also in a relationship with each other.

== Cast ==
- Vicky Harris as Elsa
- Valeria Christodoulidou as Vera
- Paschalis Tsarouhas as Elsa's Husband Dead Man
- Nikos Kordinos as Security Guard
- Panos Vourlamis as Security Guard
