= Law 4000 =

Law No. 4000
- Greek: Νόμος 4000
- Directed by: Giannis Dalianidis
- Written by: Giannis Dalianidis
- Starring: Zoi Laskari; Vangelis Voulgaridis; Vasilis Diamantopoulos; Thanos Papadopoulos; Kostas Voutsas; Eleni Zafeiriou
- Edited by: Petros Licas
- Distributed by: Finos Film
- Release date: 29 October 1962
- Running time: 93 minutes
- Country: Greece
- Language: Greek

Nomos 4000 (Greek: Νόμος 4000, "Law 4000") is a 1962 Greek drama film directed and written by Giannis Dalianidis and starring Zoi Laskari and Vasilis Diamantopoulos. The film was produced by Finos Films. The title is derived from the Greek Law 4000/1958 about teddy boyism.

== Plot ==
Andreas Eonomou is a strict father and a High School teacher. Among his pupils is Giorgos The latter fell in love with the daughter (and only child) of Andreas, Maria.

An incident in the school results in teachers being aware of the relationship between his student and his daughter, who has an abortion. In another school incident, a student, called Evangelou, mocks Mr Andreas during the lesson by drawing him with ears of a donkey, causing the teacher's fury and the eventual expulsion of the boy from the school. Then, the same student is lured by some thugs to splash yogurt on his teacher. After his action, the perpetrator is caught by police and has his head shaved and be paraded with a sign reading about his offense.

== Release ==
The film made 118,841 ticket sales in Greece in 1962.

== Cast ==
- Zoi Laskari as Maria Economou
- Kostas Voutsas as Renos
- Vangelos Voulgaridis as Giorgos Anagnostou
- Vasilis Diamantopoulos as Andreas Economou
- Eleni Zafeiriou as Andreas' wife
- Spyros Moussouris as Giorgos' father
- Hloi Liaskou as Maria's friend
- Katerina Gogou as Maria's friend
- Athena Michailidou as Giorgos' mother
