= Kostas Tsakonas =

Greek actor

- Born: 11 October 1943; Athens, Greece
- Died: 4 November 2015 (aged 72); Corinth, Greece
- Occupation: Actor

Kostas Tsakonas (Greek: Κώστας Τσάκωνας, 11 October 1943 – 4 November 2015) was a Greek actor.

== Career ==
His first appearance was in film and he became famous after appearing in a short length movie Kostas Zirinis. Later, he played many protagonistic roles in film, theater and in television. He appeared in several films including Mathe pedi mou gramata, Mathe pedi mou basket, Yia mia houfta touvla, Klassiki periptosi vlavis and O fakiris.

== Death ==
Tsakonas died of cancer on 4 November 2015 at the age of 72.

== Filmography ==
Year	Film title (English translation)	Original title and transliteration
1981	Learn How to Read and Write, Son	Μάθε παιδί μου γράμματα Mathe pedi mou gramata
1984	What Ι will see	Τι έχουν να δουν τα μάτια μου
1985	The loan shark	Ο τοκογλύφος
1985	Professional Fan	Επαγγελματίας Οπαδός
1985	Knight of craving	'Ιππότης της λιγούρας
1986	Learn How to Dribble, Son	Μάθε παιδί μου μπάσκετ Mathe paidi mou basket
1986	The mafia priest	Ο παπαμαφίας
1986	Cuckold and beaten	Κερατάς και δαρμένος
1987	Profession: Woman	Επάγγελμα γυναίκα
1987	A Fistful of Bricks	Για μια χούφτα τούβλα
1987	Classic situation of malfunction	Κλασική περίπτωση βλάβης
1987	I am a Pontic and do whatever I want	Πόντιος είμαι ότι θέλω κάνω
1988	The hunter of lost bald	Ο κυνηγός της χαμένης φαλάκρας
1988	The big clog	Η μεγάλη απόφραξη
1989	The fakir	Ο φακίρης
