= Stathis Psaltis =

Greek actor

- Born: 27 February 1948; Velo, Greece
- Died: April 21, 2017 (aged 66); Athens, Greece
- Resting place: First Cemetery of Athens
- Occupation: Actor
- Notable work: Kamikazi agapi mou

Stathis Psaltis (Greek: Στάθης Ψάλτης; 27 February 1948 – 21 April 2017) was a Greek cinema, TV and theatre actor. He was best known for starring in many 1980s films, as many as four a year. He has been called "iconic" and a "household name".

== Life ==
He was born in Velo, Corinthia in 1948, where he lived his childhood until the age of 11, when his family moved to Aegaleo. His brother is the actor Yiannis Rotas. He studied at the Drama school of Konstantinos Michaelidis. He married Taria Boura and in 2006 he married actress Christina Fitsaki. He already had one daughter, Maria, from his previous marriage to Katia Kyvelou.

== Career ==
He starred in many Greek films and also performed in the theatre. He became popular in the 1980s with commercial movies that included "Kamikazi agapi mou", "Troxonomos Varvara", "Ta kamakia", "Vasika Kalispera sas", "Kai o protos matakias", "Trellos eimai oti thelo kano", "Ela na agapithoume darling", and "Mantepse ti kano ta vradia".

== Death ==
On 12 April 2014, the actor suffered a stroke. He was admitted to the Athens Oncology Hospital "Agios Savvas" on 14 March 2017, dealing with multiple cancer metastases. Since 16 April, he was intubated in the Hospital's Intensive Care Unit, where he died on 21 April 2017. He was buried at the Zografou cemetery, in the presence of many of his friends and colleagues, on April 24, 2017. His remains were transferred to the First Cemetery of Athens on 27 July 2022.

== Personal life ==
He was married to Christina, and had a daughter, Maria.

== Filmography ==
- Diamantia sto gymno sou soma (1972) ... aka Diamantia sto gymno kormi tis (Greece: TV title)
- "Emporoi ton ethnon, Oi" (1973) TV Series .... Joker
- Paidia tis piatsas, Ta (1979)
- Fadarines, Oi (1979) ... aka Οι Φανταρίνες (Greece)
- "Symvolaiografos, O" (1979) TV Series .... Panagiotis Merkatos
- Podogyros, O (1980)
- Parthenokynigos, O (1980)
- Madepse ti kano ta bradia (1980) .... Kosmas Papakosmas
- Kotsos stin EOK, O (1980)
- Gefsi apo Ellada! (1980)
- Trohonomos Varvara (1981)
- Pame gia kafe? (1981)
- Kotsos exo apo to NATO, O (1981)
- Kamakia, Ta (1981)
- Eisai stin EOK, pathe gia tin EOK (1981) ... aka Eisai stin EOK, mathe gia tin EOK
- Vasika... kalispera sas (1982) .... Efstathios Koubaris... aka Radiopeirates, Oi
- Sainia, Ta (1982) .... Sissifos
- Periergos, O (1982) .... Simos
- Kai... o protos matakias (1982)
- Pes ta Chrisostome (1983)
- Kamikazi, agapi mou (1983) .... Efstathios Sgouros
- Trelos eimai, oti thelo kano (1984) .... Michalis Vidas
- Ela na... gymnothoume, darling (1984) .... Stathis... aka Ela n' agapithoume, darling
- Rakos... no. 14, kai o protos bounakias (1985) .... Iraklis Spinos... aka Rakos No. 14
- Psilos, lignos kai pseftaros (1985)
- Kleftroni kai gentleman (1986) .... Stathis Ledoakridis... aka Κλεφτρόνι και tζέντλεμαν (Greece)
- Kavalaris ton FM Stereo, O (1986) .... Stathis Papastathis
- Xenodoheio kastri (1987)
- Pantachou paron (1987)
- Kivernisseis peftoune alla o Psaltis menei, I (1987) (V) .... Mantis Kalhas
- Megalos paramythas, O (1988)
- Kai deilos kai tolmiros (1988) .... Markos Tremoulas
- Enas, alla... leon (1988) .... Stathis
- Akatamahitos pilotos (1988) (V) (An Irresistible pilot)
- Treladiko polyteleias (1989) .... Stathis Ksetripis (The Luxurious Nuthouse)
- Protaris batsos kai i troteza, O (1989)
- Apagogi sta tyfla (1989) .... Stathis (The Blind Kidnapping)
- Erastis, O (1990) (V) .... Stathis Birbitsolis (The Lover)
- Kalimera zoe (1994) TV Series
- Kotes (2003)
- An m'agapas (2006) TV Series .... Dimitris Marnis
- Achristos, atalantos, asximos alla diashmos (2007) .... Himself
- Ta Thelei o.....Kolotravas Mas (2007)
- Oi Prasines, Oi Kokkines, Oi Thalassies oi Tsouxtres (2008)
- Nou Dou oi Asximi (2008)
- Pou Pas Re Giorgaki me tetoio Kairo (2011)
