= Law 4000/1958 =

Theorized, extinct, Greek law

Law 4000/1958 (Greek: Νόμος 4000/1958) was legislation introduced by Konstantinos Karamanlis's government in 1958 and dealt with young troublemakers, the so-called "teddy boys" (τεντιμπόις, τεντιμπόιδες).

The law penalized verbal insults. Youngsters who threw yoghurt or fruits on elderly people were arrested by the police and taken to the detention centre, where they were given a buzz cut and had the revers of their trousers ripped. In addition, their parents faced prosecution. The law came into force on 3 September 1958, when three youngsters were arrested and paraded through the streets of Athens.

This advocacy of public humiliation made the law very controversial, but it remained in use until 1981, and was finally abolished in 1983, by the government of Andreas Papandreou. The movie Nomos 4000, directed by Giannis Dalianidis, was inspired by the law.
