= Morning Patrol =

- Theatrical release poster
- Πρωϊνή Περίπολος
- Directed by: Nikos Nikolaidis
- Written by: Nikos Nikolaidis
- Story by: Daphne du Maurier; Philip K. Dick; Raymond Chandler; Herman Raucher
- Produced by: Nikos Nikolaidis
- Starring: Michele Valley; Takis Spiridakis; Liana Hatzi; Nikos Hatzis; V. Kabouri; Takis Loukatos; H. Mavros; Panos Thanassoulis; Rania Trivela
- Cinematography: Dinos Katsouridis
- Edited by: Andreas Andreadakis
- Music by: Giorgos Hatzinasios
- Production company: Greek Film Center
- Distributed by: Greek Film Center
- Release date: 8 October 1987 (Thessaloniki Festival of Greek Cinema)
- Running time: 105 Minutes
- Country: Greece
- Language: Greek

Morning Patrol (Greek: Πρωινή Περίπολος, romanized: Proini Peripolos) is a 1987 Greek science fiction art film directed by Nikos Nikolaidis. It introduced a new iconography to Nikolaidis' work and contains several elements somewhat resembling the thriller genre and post-apocalyptic science fiction. The film has an elaborate yet simple script of strongly contrasting moods. The film's dialogue contains excerpts taken from published works authored by Daphne du Maurier, Philip K. Dick, Raymond Chandler, and Herman Raucher.

It received the Best Director Award and the Greek National Ministry of Culture Award at the Thessaloniki Festival of Greek Cinema in October 1987, where Dinos Katsouridis also won the Best Cinematographer Award and Marie-Louise Bartholomew also won the Best Art Director Award. The film went on further to be officially selected for screening at Fantasporto in February 1989 where it was nominated for the International Fantasy Film Award and it was also officially selected for screening at the Avoriaz Fantastic Film Festival in January 1987 where it was nominated for the Grand Prize.

== Plot ==
A lonely and perplexed woman, played by future Nikolaidis mainstay Michele Valley, wanders through the ruins of a destroyed and deserted city in a post-apocalyptic era. She wonders whatever happened and where did all the residents disappear to. She does not remember much about herself, including even her own name, where is she supposed to be going, and whether she ever had any relatives.

Her searches throughout the city are not successful and no one can help her. Memories of the past come in the form of dreams and bestow upon her guidance and hope; all alone, in a mysterious and abandoned place, she finds the travel difficult. The windows and doors of the city's buildings are all open and the city is almost entirely silent, a silence violated only by the sounds coming out of a film theater in which the protagonist finds herself at one instance.

However, the reigning silence is only an appearance, for at times the city comes alive and becomes a dangerous place. Carelessness and gullibility can cost lives. The woman finally meets a lonely man in despair, employed as a guard, eventually finding with him the ultimate link between love and death (a theme which Nikolaidis explored in his later films).

== Cast ==
- Michele Valley as Woman
- Takis Spiridakis as Guard
- Liana Hatzi as Drunkard
- Nikos Hatzis as Tramp
- V. Kabouri
- Takis Loukatos as Master
- H. Mavros
- Panos Thanassoulis as Second Guard
- Rania Trivela
