= Thodoros Maragos =

Greek film director

Thodoros Maragos or Marangos (Greek: Θόδωρος Μαραγκός; born 1944, Filiatra) is a Greek film director. His work spans film, TV and documentaries.

He is best known for his film Learn How to Read and Write, Son (in Greek: Μάθε παιδί μου γράμματα), a satire on fascism and one of the best anti-Junta films of all time. He won four awards in the 14th Thessaloniki Film Festival (September 24–30, 1973) for his movie Get on Your Mark (original title in Greek: Λάβετε θέσεις).His box office major success, the 1981 film Learn How to Read and Write, Son, has also won four awards in the 22nd Thessaloniki Festival (October 5–11, 1981). In 2023 Isovites was featured at the Greek Film Festival in Berlin starring Vangelis Mourikis.

His films, including "Learn How to Read and Write, Son," have been recognized for their satirical and socially critical themes, addressing political oppression and everyday life under authoritarianism, establishing him as a distinctive voice in postwar Greek cinema..

Maragos debut in Greek television in 1989 was the groundbreaking series `Emmones Idees` for three major reasons: ``1. Breaking the Cultural Barrier for the Diaspora by casting Angelique Rockas a Greek-speaking actress born outside of Greece in a very insular Greek film and TV landscape; 2. Defying the Cinema vs. Television Stigma • Because directing for TV was considered beneath most film directors Maragos directed `Emmones Idees` on his own terms, treating `Emmones Idees` like a multi-part cinematic satire rather than a cheap sitcom. He brought film-level casting standards to the project; 3.The Genesis of Vangelis Mourikis , widely respected in modern Greek cinema as a film giant —known for his raw, intense performances in acclaimed films like The King, Soul Kicking, and Stratos, in 1989, however, he was a newcomer trying to find his footing. Emmones Idees was the literal launchpad and starting point of his professional career.``

In 2026, Theodoros Maragos received the “Vasilis Georgiadis – Personality of the Year 2026” award from the Academy of Hellenic Art Awards, recognizing his lifelong contribution to Greek cinema. The ceremony took place on 25 February 2026 at the Piraeus Chamber of Commerce and Industry (EBEP).

== Filmography ==
- 2008 Boobheads aka `Isovites `
- 2005 Black Baaa... (Documentary)
- 2004 God Is Invisible Because He Is Minute (Documentary)
- 1994 Moon Runaway
- 1991 Polytehneio (Documentary)
- 1989-1990 Emmones Idees (TV Series) with Angelique Rockas leading the cast
- 1984 Ti ehoun na doun ta matia mou
- 1981 Learn How to Read and Write, Son
- 1980 Thanasi, sfixe ki allo to zonari
- 1978 Apo pou pane gia ti havouza
- 1977 Ergatiki kokkini Protomagia 77 (Documentary short)
- 1975 Struggle (Documentary) `Lavete Theses`
- 1973 Get on Your Mark
- 1971 'Sssst (Short)
- 1971 Oikopedo (Short)
- 1969 Tsouf (Short)

== Novelist ==
“The Teacher of Arcadia and the TALOS 21st Century” March 2023
