= Sweet Bunch =

- Theatrical release poster
- Γλυκιά Συμμορία
- Directed by: Nikos Nikolaidis
- Written by: Nikos Nikolaidis
- Produced by: Nikos Nikolaidis
- Starring: Despina Tomazani; Dora Maskalvanou; Takis Moschos; Takis Spiridakis; Alkis Panagiotidis; Lenia Polycrati; Konstantinos Tzoumas; Dinos Makris; Andreas Tsafos; Haris Romas; Takis Loukatos; Alkmini Stavrou; Marianna Koutalou; Katerina Sigountou; Fay Tsanetopoulou; Natasa Kapsabeli; Isavella Mavraki; Natasha Assiki; Fotini Kotrotsi; Hristos Zygomalas; Panayotis Kaldis; Manos Tsilimidis; Giorgos Polyhroniadis; Panos Thanassoulis; Nikos Katomeris; Elias Kostandakopoulos; Nikos Stavropoulos; Giannis Kouriotis; Spiros Bibilas; Kostas Baladimas
- Cinematography: Aris Stavrou
- Edited by: Andreas Andreadakis
- Music by: Giorgos Hatzinasios; The Fontane Sisters; McGuire Sisters; Eddie Cochran; Giuseppe Verdi; Adolphe Adam; Johann Sebastian Bach
- Production companies: Vergeti Brothers; Greek Film Center
- Distributed by: Greek Film Center; Restless Wind
- Release date: 19 October 1983 (Thessaloniki Festival of Greek Cinema)
- Running time: 146 Minutes
- Country: Greece
- Language: Greek

Sweet Bunch (Greek: Γλυκιά Συμμορία, romanized: Glykia Symmoria) is a 1983 Greek dramatic experimental independent underground art film directed by Nikos Nikolaidis. The film, produced by Vergeti Brothers and the Greek Film Center, is the second part of the "Years of Cholera" trilogy beginning with The Wretches Are Still Singing (1979) and ending with The Loser Takes It All (2002) which deals with the last decades of the twentieth century. The original Greek title directly references the Greek title of the 1969 Sam Peckinpah film The Wild Bunch (Greek: Άγρια Συμμορία, romanized: Agria Symmoria). The film uses as background music the 1958 song "Sugartime" written by Charlie Phillips and Odis Echols as well as the 1940 song "Sweet Mara" (Greek: «Γλυκιά Μαράτα,» tr. "Glykia Marata") composed by Leo Rapitis to lyrics by Kostas Kofiniotis which was performed by Kakia Mendri. It was distributed by the Greek Film Center in Greece and by Restless Wind abroad.

== Plot ==
A group of four misfits, Argyris, Andreas, Marina, and Sofia, live together in a house. Andreas just got out of jail. All four have become disillusioned with life and have lost any reason to live or die. They try all criminal experiences with each member of the group choosing a different activity to experiment in: frequenting expensive restaurants and leaving without paying, shoplifting, starring in pornographic films, and creating an anti-state organization. The authorities put them under surveillance, waiting for the slightest false step from any of them before acting violently. The first such misstep occurs when Sofia kills the police chief who monitors their home.

== Cast ==
- Despina Tomazani as Sofia
- Dora Maskalvanou as Marina
- Takis Moschos as Argyris
- Takis Spiridakis as Andreas
- Alkis Panagiotidis as Xanthos
- Lenia Polycrati as Roza
- Konstantinos Tzoumas as Konstantinos
- Dinos Makris
- Andreas Tsafos
- Haris Romas
- Takis Loukatos
- Alkmini Stavrou
- Marianna Koutalou
- Katerina Sigountou
- Fay Tsanetopoulou
- Natasa Kapsabeli
- Isavella Mavraki
- Natasha Assiki
- Fotini Kotrotsi
- Hristos Zygomalas
- Panayotis Kaldis
- Manos Tsilimidis
- Giorgos Polyhroniadis
- Panos Thanassoulis
- Nikos Katomeris
- Elias Kostandakopoulos
- Nikos Stavropoulos
- Giannis Kouriotis
- Spiros Bibilas
- Kostas Baladimas

== Accolades ==
In October 1983, at the Thessaloniki Festival of Greek Cinema, the film won the Athens Film Critics Association Best Picture Award, executive producer, art director, set designer, and costume designer Marie-Louise Bartholomew won the Best Costume Designer Award, Andreas Andreadakis won the Best Editor Award, Marinos Athanasopoulos won the Best Sound Recordist Award, Aris Stavrou won the Best Cinematographer Award, and Takis Spiridakis won the Best Actor Special Mention Award. The Greek Film Critics Association voted this film in 2006 as the joint seventh greatest in Greek cinematic history.
