= The Wretches Are Still Singing =

1979 film by Nikos Nikolaidis

- Theatrical release poster
- Τα Κουρέλια Τραγουδάνε Ακόμα...
- Directed by: Nikos Nikolaidis
- Written by: Nikos Nikolaidis
- Produced by: Nikos Nikolaidis
- Starring: Alkis Panagiotidis; Konstantinos Tzoumas; Rita Bensousan; Hristos Valavanidis; Dora Kalogridi; Gioula Kazoni; Maritina Passari; Antigoni Amanitou; Youla Anagnostou; Dimitris Politimos; Olia Lazaridou
- Cinematography: Stavros Hassapis
- Edited by: Andreas Andreadakis
- Music by: Jerry Lee Lewis; Bo Diddley; Julie London; Bill Haley; Little Richard; Sarah Vaughan; The Platters; Brenda Lee; Roy Orbison; Nat King Cole; Connie Francis; The Everly Brothers
- Release date: September 1979 (Thessaloniki Festival of Greek Cinema)
- Running time: 118 Minutes
- Country: Greece
- Language: Greek

The Wretches Are Still Singing (Greek: Τα Κουρέλια Τραγουδάνε Ακόμα..., romanized: Ta Kourelia Tragoudane Akoma...) is a 1979 Greek dramatic experimental independent surrealist underground art film directed by Nikos Nikolaidis. It is the first part of the "Years of Cholera" trilogy continuing with Sweet Bunch (1983) and ending with The Loser Takes It All (2002).

== Plot ==
The director studied the transformation of social values using the example of a group of five friends who meet after a long separation and share with each other the details of their difficult lives. The film became the symbol of the 1950s generation and reflected his personal views on the problem of alienation in the modern world. The film was shot in a surreal way with a predilection for the aesthetics of the Marquis de Sade. In it, for the first time in Nikolaidis' filmography, one can see the characteristic elements of film noir which became part and parcel of Nikolaidis' unique approach in the majority of the films that followed. The film follows four men who had been adolescents in the 1950s and are now in their forties. A fifth person, a woman, who has been in and out of psychiatric hospitals due to unspecified disorders, also appears. Efi Papazachariou, who wrote an article about it in World Film Locations: Athens, stated that it is "one of the most unconventional Greek films."

== Accolades ==
The film won the Best Director Award and the Athens Film Critics Association Best Picture Award at the Thessaloniki Festival of Greek Cinema in September 1979, where, furthermore, Hristos Valavanidis won the Best Actor Award, Marinos Athanasopoulos won the Best Sound Recordist Award, and Andreas Andreadakis won the Best Editor Award.

== Cast ==
- Alkis Panagiotidis as Alkis
- Konstantinos Tzoumas as Konstantinos
- Rita Bensousan as Rita
- Christos Valavanidis as Hristos
- Dora Kalogridi as Dora
- Gioula Kazoni as Thief
- Maritina Passari
- Antigoni Amanitou as White Clothes-Wearing Lady
- Youla Anagnostou
- Dimitris Politimos as Dimitris
- Olia Lazaridou as Vera
