= Vasika... kalispera sas =

Good Evening to You
- Greek: Βασικά... Καλησπέρα σας
- Directed by: Giannis Dalianidis
- Starring: Stathis Psaltis; Panos Mihalopoulos
- Release date: 1982
- Running time: 1h 30min
- Country: Greece
- Language: Greek

Vasika... kalispera sas (Greek: Βασικά... Καλησπέρα σας) is a 1982 Greek comedy film directed by Giannis Dalianidis.

== Cast ==
- Stathis Psaltis - Stathis
- Panos Mihalopoulos - Panos
- Stamatis Gardelis - Denis
- Efi Pikoula - Betty
- Yorgos Rigas - Sotos
- Yannis Bostantzoglou - Kyriakos
- Nikolaos Papadopoulos - Tzimis
- Sofia Aliberti - Lilian
- Kaiti Finou - Koula
- Rena Pagrati - Rena
