= Kato Platres =

Kato Platres Κάτω Πλάτρες (Greek) Τορνάρηδες (Greek)
- Village
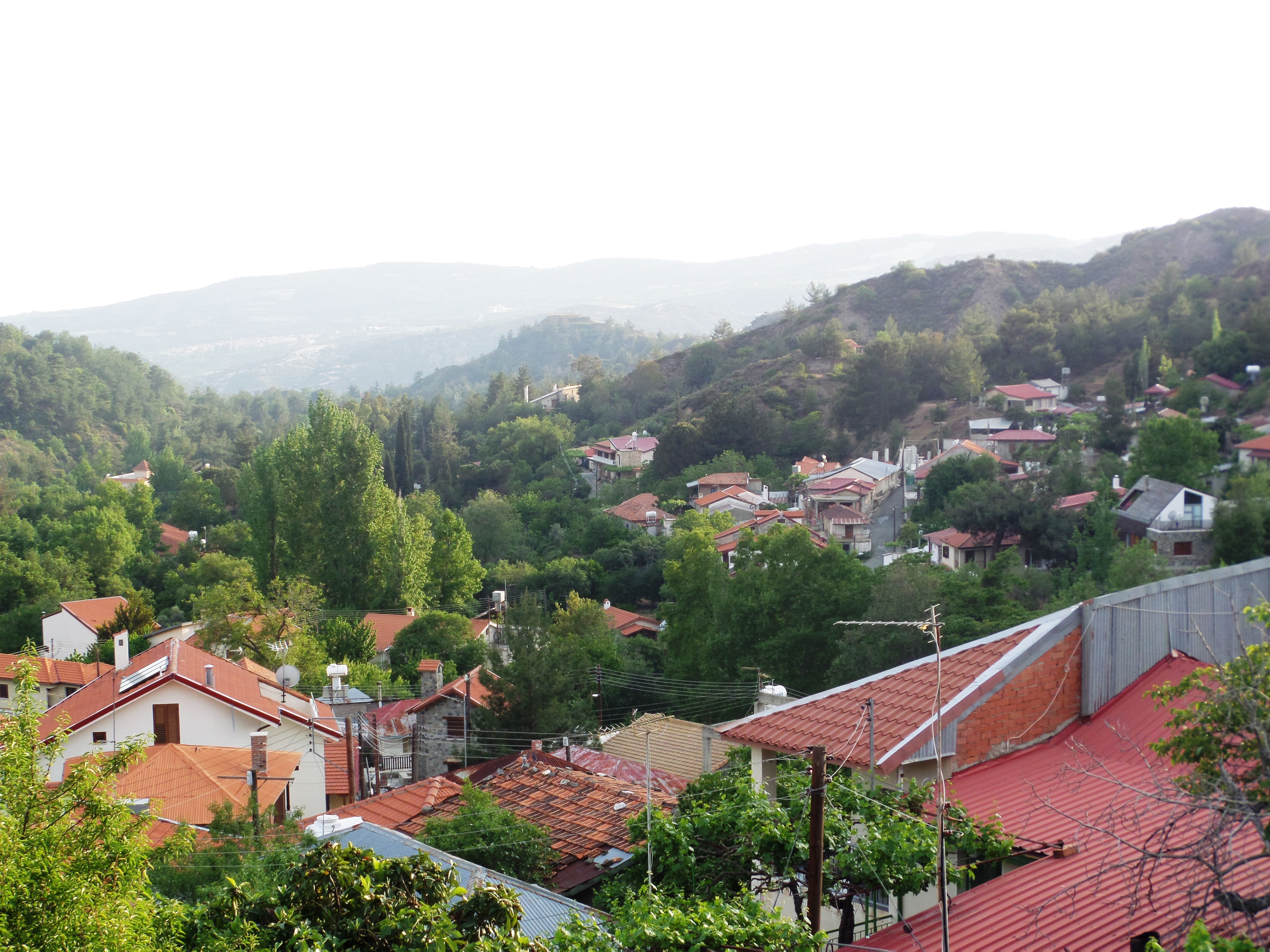

- Location within Cyprus
- Coordinates: 34°52′46″N 32°50′29″E
- Country: Cyprus
- District: Limassol
- Elevation: 920 m (3,020 ft)

Population (2011)
  - Total: 148
- Time zone: UTC+2 (EET)
- Postal code: CY-4815

Kato Platres (Greek: Κάτω Πλάτρες) also known as Tornarides is a mountainous village in Cyprus. It is located on the southern slopes of the Troödos Mountains (Greek: Τρόοδος) and is one of the Krasochoria (Greek: Κρασοχώρια) (wine village). Kato Platres is approximately 24 kilometers (15 mi) north-west of Limassol and 46 kilometers (29 mi) south-west of the capital Nicosia.
