= Euridice BA 2037 =

- Theatrical release poster
- Ευριδίκη ΒΑ 2037
- Directed by: Nikos Nikolaidis
- Written by: Nikos Nikolaidis
- Produced by: Nikos Nikolaidis; Vadim Glowna; Vera Tschechowa
- Starring: Vera Tschechowa; John Moore; Niki Triantafillidi; Manolis Logiadis
- Cinematography: Giorgos Panousopoulos
- Edited by: Giorgos Triandafyllou
- Music by: Antonio Vivaldi; Frédéric Chopin; Dinah Shore
- Production companies: Atossa Film Produktion GmbH; Marni Film
- Release date: 29 September 1975 (Thessaloniki Festival of Greek Cinema)
- Running time: 96 minutes
- Countries: Greece; West Germany
- Language: Greek

Euridice BA 2037 (Greek: Ευριδίκη ΒΑ 2037) is a 1975 Greek-West German co-production black and white dramatic surrealist underground film directed by Nikos Nikolaidis, his debut feature film.

== Plot ==
Partially based on Greek mythology, the film centers on Eurydice as she waits for her lover Orpheus to save her from Hades. While waiting for her rescue from the underworld, she faces her fears, desires, hallucinations, and memories.

== Cast ==
- Vera Tschechowa as Eurydice
- John Moore as Man
- Niki Triantafillidi as Woman
- Manolis Logiadis

== Reception ==
=== Accolades ===
Despite a lukewarm reaction by viewers, critics appreciated the innovative perspective on the classic Greek tragedy of Orpheus and Eurydice and noted the originality of Nikolaidis' artistic techniques. It is characteristic that Nikolaidis himself believed Euridice BA 2037 to be his best film.

André Z. Labarrére and Olivier Labarrére, authors of Atlas du cinéma, wrote that the film was one of the "New Greek Cinema" films that "radically transformed the panorama."

For this film, Nikolaidis won the Best New Director Award, the Greek National Ministry of Culture Award, as well as the Athens Film Critics Association Best Picture Award at the Thessaloniki Festival of Greek Cinema in September 1975, where Marie-Louise Bartholomew, who was involved in the production of the film, also won the Best Set Designer Award, and Andreas Andreadakis, who was involved in the editing of the film, also won the Best Editor Award.
