= Learn How to Read and Write, Son =

Learn How to Read and Write, Son Μάθε παιδί μου γράμματα
- Directed by: Thodoros Maragos
- Written by: Thodoros Maragos
- Produced by: Thodoros Maragos
- Starring: Vasilis Diamantopoulos; Nikos Kalogeropoulos; Kostas Tsakonas; Anna Mantzourani
- Release date: 1981
- Running time: 96 minutes
- Country: Greece
- Language: Greek

Learn How to Read and Write, Son (Greek: Μάθε παιδί μου γράμματα, romanized: Mathe paidi mou grammata) is a 1981 Greek drama/comedy film directed by Thodoros Maragos and starring Vasilis Diamantopoulos, Nikos Kalogeropoulos, Kostas Tsakonas and Anna Mantzourani.

== Plot ==
The story is set in a mountain village in Arcadia (the movie was filmed in Stemnitsa, Dimitsana and the surrounding areas) shortly later the Metapolitefsi (the fall of the military junta of 1967–74). The unveiling of a repository to those who died during the Occupation (World War II) stirs up the village, because the name of a communist partisan who was killed was omitted. Periklis (V. Diamantopoulos), a conservative high school teacher, comes to clash with his wife and his two sons over whether Chrysanthi and her family have a right to put a wreath in memory of the partisan.

== Cast ==
- Vasilis Diamantopoulos as Pericles Papachristoforos
- Anna Mantzourani as Elpida Papachristoforou
- Kostas Tsakonas as Demosthenes Papachristoforos
- Nikos Kalogeropoulos as Socrates Papachristoforos
- Christos Kalavrouzos as Kanavos
- Dimos Avdeliodis
- Giorgos Vrasivanopoulos

== Awards ==
The film won three awards at the 1981 Thessaloniki Film Festival:

List of awards and nominations
Award	Category	Recipients and nominees	Result
1981 Thessaloniki Film Festival	Best Leading Actor	Vasilis Diamantopoulos	Won
1981 Thessaloniki Film Festival	Best Leading Actress	Anna Mantzourani	Won
1981 Thessaloniki Film Festival	Best Production Design	Stamatis Tsarouhas, Angeliki Maragkou	Won
