= Sotiris Moustakas =

Greek Cypriot actor (1940–2007)

- Moustakas in the movie Enas nomotagis politis (1974)
- Born: 17 September 1940; Kato Platres, British Cyprus
- Died: 4 June 2007 (aged 66); Athens, Greece
- Occupations: Actor; comedian
- Years active: 1961–2007
- Spouse: Maria Bonelou (m. 1973)
- Children: 1

Sotiris Moustakas (Greek: Σωτήρης Μουστάκας; 17 September 1940 – 4 June 2007) was a Greek Cypriot actor born in Kato Platres, Limassol. His acting career lasted for over four decades, with 1960s–80s as his most successful years. He was described as an "Actor without a Label" because of his acting in theatrical plays (many different genres), films, television movies, television series, videotape/videocassette movies and many more with great reviews and success in all of them. He became internationally famous with his role "Mimithos" in 1964 Oscar-winning film Zorba the Greek. After that he became a national star in Cyprus and Greece, being part of the Golden Age of the Cypriot and Greek Cinema (1950s–1970s). His last cinema performance was in 2007 Goya Award-winning film El Greco, where he played "Titian". He gave his voice in the Greek dub of 2007 Disney film Meet the Robinsons, as his last role. He mainly played comedy roles throughout his career. Moustakas was regarded as one of the greatest Cypriot and Greek comedian actors in history.

== Early life ==
He was born on 17 September 1940, in Kato Platres. He was the youngest of seven siblings.

== Career ==
One of the most significant comic actors of Greece and Cyprus, Moustakas graduated from the National Theater of Greece Drama School and was known for his portrayal of offbeat, neurotic yet likable characters. In many of his movies he portrayed multiple roles. He appeared primarily in modern films and plays, although he also performed several roles in classical works.

Moustakas' international film debut came in 1964 in the Oscar-winning Zorba the Greek starring Anthony Quinn, in which he played Mimithos, the village idiot. For that film Moustakas lost his Academy Award nomination for Best Supporting Actor only for two more minutes of filming. As Moustakas said, they had filmed many more minutes of playing, but they didn't put all the scenes on the film's final cut.

Although his recent work was mainly in the theatre, he also had a role in the 2007 film El Greco.

== Political activities ==
Although not widely advertised, Moustakas in his youth was involved in the Greek Cypriot national liberation struggle of EOKA against British colonialism, acting as a messenger, and writing political graffiti. During that period, he was arrested by the British and spent 7 months in jail.

== Death ==
He was admitted to the Athens Euroclinic with an acute respiratory infection, after feeling very unwell during a rehearsal at the theatre on 3 June 2007. He died of septic shock in the early hours of 4 June 2007, at age 66. He suffered from cancer in the last years of his life. At his funeral, his coffin was draped with a Greek flag.

== Personal life ==
He was married to the Greek actress Maria Bonellou, with whom he had a daughter, Alexia. His wife, Maria, died on August 30, 2007, due to Alzheimer, at the age of 66, about 3 months after the death of Sotiris.

== Selected filmography ==
- Zorba the Greek (1964) (a.k.a. Alexis Zorbas, USA) .... Mimithos
- To Prosopo tis imeras (1965)
- Beethoven kai bouzouki (1965) .... Orfeas
- Une balle au coeur (1966) (a.k.a. A Bullet Through the Heart, (International: English title), a.k.a. Devil at My Heels (USA), a.k.a. Mia sfaira stin kardia (Greece))
- Na zi kaneis i na mi zi? (1966) .... Solomon
- Fos... Nero... Tilefono, Oikopeda me doseis (1966) .... Krikor
- Fifis, o aktypitos (1966) .... Michalios Yatayanakis
- Kalos ilthe to dollario (1967) .... Henry
- Martha (1967) .... Hector (uncredited)
- O Modistros (1967) .... Stefanos
- O Kosmos trellathike... (1967) .... Pythagoras
- O Hazobabas (1967) .... Doctor
- Kolonaki: Diagogi miden (1967) .... Pavlos Aspromallis
- I Kori tis Pentagiotissas (1967)
- Gia tin kardia tis oraias Elenis (1967) (a.k.a. Theotrella neiata... xemoramena geramata), (Greece: reissue title))
- Erotes sti Lesvo (1967) (a.k.a. O Thanatos ehase to paihnidi, (Greece))
- Adiki katara (1967)
- Athina, i klopi tis odou Stadiou (1968) (a.k.a. Nude as a Trap) .... Sotos
- Tha ta kapso, ta lefta mou (1968) .... Kleon Karapanos
- Ta Psihoula tou kosmou (1968)
- O Tsahpinis (1968) .... Kosmas
- O Petheropliktos (1968) .... Lavredis
- Oi Mnistires tis Pinelopis (1968) .... Filippos
- O Boufos (1968) .... Dinos Zafiriou
- Pethaino kathe ximeroma (1969)
- I Oraia tou kourea (1969) .... Thomas
- Xypna koroido (1969) .... Faidonas Tramountanas
- H omorfh kai o tzanabetis (1969)
- Fovatai o Yannis to therio (1969) (a.k.a. Tha pao stin zougla me ton Tarzan) .... Anastasis
- Ena asteio koritsi (1970) .... Antonio
- To Paidi tis mamas (1970) .... Fotis
- O Ahaireftos (1970) .... Miltos Kourkoutoulis
- I Tyhi mou trelathike (1970) .... Liakos
- Anastenazoun oi penies (1970) .... Manolios
- Arhipseftaros (1971) .... Paminos
- Thymios enantion Tsitsou (1971) (a.k.a. Dyo sainia, Ta (Greece: TV title) ... a.k.a. Thymios enantion olon (Greece: TV title) .... Timolis
- Oi Andres xeroun n' agapoun (1971) (a.k.a. To timima tis agapis, (Greece: video box title)
- Gia mia choufta Touristries (1971) .... Police Officer
- Enas nomotagis politis (1974) .... Grigoris Monahogios
- Gynaikes sta opla (1979) .... President
- O Parthenokynigos (1980) .... Iraklis
- Kathenas me tin trella tou... (1980) .... Sotiris
- Gefsi apo Ellada! (1980) .... Hungry Man
- To Megalo routhouni (1981) .... Alexandros / Thiseas Doxapatris
- I 'Nona' (1981) (a.k.a. Nona enantion mafiozou, (Greece: video title)) .... Thiseas Doxapatris / Nona
- Pater Gomenios (1982) .... Menios
- O Kamikazi tsantakias (1982) .... Poseidonas
- Ego... kai to pouli mou (1982) (a.k.a. Knock out ston erota, (Greece: TV title) .... Kokos
- To Psonio (1983) .... Sotiris Haritos
- To Paizo kai poly andras (1983) .... Zinon Petridis
- Kai aftos to violi tou (a.k.a. An itan to violi pouli) (1984)... Lefteris Paganikskis
- Mitsos, o rezilis (1984) (a.k.a. O Glykopseftis, (Greece: TV title)) .... Mitsos
- Ta Touvla (1985) .... Sotos Stournos
- O Roz gatos (1986) .... Archimidis Mantouvalos / Efterpi
- O Dynasteias (1986) .... Bebis Karinkopoulos / Dionisakis 'Tarzan' Karinkopoulos / Odysseas
- Merikes ton protimoun... ilektroniko (1986) .... Telis / Paraskevas
- O Petheropliktos (1987) .... Iakovos
- Sexy batsos kai skliros (1987) .... Sotiris Sotiriou / Antonis Kourouflexis
- O Tsitsiolinos (1987) .... Lefteris Spanomarias
- Kourio o Periklis (1987) .... Periklis
- Erastis gia 11 nihtes (1988) .... Angelos Klapsopoulos
- Varis glykos kai meraklis (1988) .... Aristeidis
- Enas trelos tha mas sossei (1988) .... Timolaos
- Andrea prohora (1988)
- Diariktis me to zori (1988) .... Michalis Papadimitrakopoulos
- Tolmi kai afassia (1988) .... Aristeidis Antoniou
- Mhn to paizeis ypourge! (1988)
- Peinasmenos kai jenleman (1989) .... Sotiris
- O Jogadoros (1989) .... Nektarios Bataktsis
- Mia treli treli nychta (1989) .... Sokratis Leonardos
- Kapetan Fortounas (1989) .... Manolis
- O Alepous (1990) .... Alepous
- Kavafis (1996)
- Mila mou kai mantarinia (1999)
- Oi Aparadektoi (1 episode) - Epitheorisi (????) TV Episode
- Petsi kai kokali (2000, TV Movie)
- Me ti ginaika tou filou mou (2000)
- armege lagous kai koureve helones (2000)
- Ti vraki tha paradossis mori? (2001, TV Movie)
- Ta Haidemena paidia (2001, TV Series) .... Nikiforos A
- O haros vgike pagania (2003)
- Emeis xasan autoi masan (2003)
- Kai fagane autoi kala kai emeis heirotera (2005)
- El Greco (2007) .... Titian (final film role)

== Awards ==
Year	Award	Category	Film	Result
1994	"Panathinea" Theatre Award	Best Actor	Hamlet	Won
1996	"Papadoukas" Award	Best Actor	Two Jobs	Won
2003	Karolos Koun Award	Lifetime Achievement Award	For his contribution in Greek revue theatre	Won
