= Vasilis Diamantopoulos =

Greek actor (1920–1999)

- Born: 15 November 1920; Piraeus, Greece
- Died: 5 May 1999 (aged 78); Athens, Greece
- Occupation: Actor
- Spouse(s): Tonia Karali, Marina Georgiou

Vasilis Diamantopoulos (Greek: Βασίλης Διαμαντόπουλος; 15 November 1920 – 5 May 1999) was a Greek actor. He was one of the founders of the Modern Theater and was the first actor to appear live on Greek television in the single act play Him and his pants by Iakovos Kambanellis in 1966. His most characteristic role was that of the austere professor in Giannis Dalianidis' movie Law 4000 and later in shorts including Ekmek Ice Cream in private TV.

For his performance in Learn How to Read and Write, Son, Diamantopoulos won the Best Actor award at the 1981 Thessaloniki Festival of Greek Cinema.

== Biography ==
He was born in Piraeus and studied at Athens Law and at the National Theatre's Dramatic schools as well as Coon Art School. He ran together along with Maria Alkeou in 1956 at the New Theatre/Theater and in 1993 at the Different Theatre. He returned to Greece from Paris in 1970 and took part in several different companies, he also took part at the Public Theatre of Northern Greece. He also participated in many film and television productions, oppositely took part at the Dramatic Schools at the National Theatre and at Art School. His last years was a member of a hypocrite art factory for young actors. He died in Athens in 1999 from a heart attack at the Athens General Clinic due to his head fracture at the left femur which triggered from the fall. He is buried at the First Athens Cemetery.

== Personal life ==
He was married twice, firstly to the actress Tonia Karali with whom he had a daughter and secondly to the actress Marina Georgiou with whom he had a son.

== Filmography ==
=== Film ===
Year	Title	Transliteration and translation	Role	Notes
Unknown	The Little Car	Το αμαξάκι To amaxaki		
1948	Marinos Kontaras	Μαρίνος Κοντάρας	Grigoris Fousekis	
1949	The Last Mission	Τελευταία αποστολή	Colonel Miltiadis Marelis	
1954	Nychterini Peripeteia	Νυχτερινή Περιπέτεια; Nighttime Adventures	Diamantis Nikolaou	
1956	I arpagi tis Persefonis	Η αρπαγή της Περσεφόνης	Dias	
1956	Ekklisiazousai			
1957	To amaxaki			
1957	Tis nihtas ta kamomata	Της νύχτας τα καμώματα	Stelios	
1959	Erotikes istories		Vasilis	
1959	Na petheros, na malama!	Να πεθερός, να μάλαμα	Andreas Delis	
1961	O thanatos tha xanarthi		Inspector Fox	
1962	Law 4000	Νόμος 4000; Nomos 4000	Andreas Ikonomou	
1962	The Journey	Το ταξίδι To taxidi	Lazy Manolis	
1962	Psila ta heria Hitler		Anestis	
1963	Afosiosi			
1964	Mia 'vdomada ston paradeiso		Aristos	
1966	A Bullet Through the Heart		Rizzardi	
1967	The Road to Corinth			
1970	The Confession			
1971	L'amour c'est gai, l'amour c'est triste			
1976	Agnostos stratiotis			
1977	O toihos i Pos piastike o Ramon Novaro			
1978	I tembelides tis eforis kiladas	Οι τεμπέληδες της εύφορης κοιλάδας	father	
1979	Jack the Knight	Τζακ ο καβαλλάρης Jack o kavallaris		
1979	To hamogelo tis Pythias			
1980	O gyrologos			
1980	Eleftherios Venizelos 1910-1927	Ελευθέριος Βενιζέλος 1910-1927	Apostolos	
1981	Mathe pedi mou gramata	Μάθε παιδί μου γράμματα	Perilkos Papachristoforos	
1981	O teleftaios... antras!			
1982	The Red train	Το κόκκινο τρένο To kokino treno	conductor	
1982	O teleftaios dialogos			
1983	Horis martyres		Lieutenant Loukas Haridimos	
1984	Akropolis Now		Camilles Vater	
1987	Ta paidia tis Chelidonas	Τα παιδιά της Χελιδόνας	Spyros	
1991	Isimeria		Teacher	
1996	Cavafy	Καβάφης	Constantine Cavafy	
1996	Business in the Balkans	Μπίζνες στα Βαλκάνια; Biznes (Business) sta Valkania	a customer at a bar	
1997	The Overcoat	The overcoat		Short

=== Television ===
Year	Title	Transliteration and translation	Channel
1973-1974	Infamous War (1971–74)	Άγνωστος Πόλεμος; Agnostos Polemos	YENED
1972-1974; 1989	Himself and Himself	Εκείνος κι εκείνος Ekinos ki ekinos	EIRT; ET2 ad his next appearance
1979	O symvolaiografos	Ο συμβολαιογράφος	ERT
1984	Hadjimanouil	Χατζημανουήλ	
1986	Here Tasso Karatasso	ERTΧαίρε Τάσο Καρατάσο; Hail Tasso Karatasso	ERT
1991	Ekmek Ice Cream	Εκμέκ παγωτό Ekmek pagoto	Mega
1994	To gelion tou pragmatos	Το γελοίον του πράγματος	ANT1
1997	I agapi argise mia mera	Η αγάπη άργησε μια μέρα	ERT
