= Nikos Nikolaidis =

Greek film director

- Νίκος Νικολαΐδης
- Nikos Nikolaidis being interviewed in 2003
- Born: Nikos Georgiou Nikolaidis; 25 October 1939; Athens, Kingdom of Greece
- Died: 5 September 2007 (aged 67); Athens, Greece
- Education: Hellenic Cinema and Television School Stavrakos; Vakalo College of Art and Design
- Occupations: Film director; Screenwriter; Film producer; Writer; Theatre director; Assistant director; Record producer; Television director; Commercial director
- Years active: 1960–2007
- Known for: Filmmaking
- Notable work: Euridice BA 2037 (1975); The Wretches Are Still Singing (1979); Sweet Bunch (1983); Morning Patrol (1987); Singapore Sling (1990); See You in Hell, My Darling (1999); The Loser Takes It All (2002); The Zero Years (2005)
- Spouse: Marie-Louise Bartholomew (married 1970–2007; his death)
- Children: Two
- Awards: Best Director Award, Greek National Ministry of Culture Award, Athens Film Critics Association Best Picture Award, Thessaloniki Festival of Greek Cinema, September 1975 (Euridice BA 2037); Best Director Award, Athens Film Critics Association Best Picture Award, Thessaloniki Festival of Greek Cinema, September 1979 (The Wretches Are Still Singing); Athens Film Critics Association Best Picture Award, Thessaloniki Festival of Greek Cinema, October 1983 (Sweet Bunch); Best Director Award, Greek National Ministry of Culture Award, Thessaloniki Festival of Greek Cinema, October 1987 (Morning Patrol); Best Director Award, Best Quality Film Award, Thessaloniki Festival of Greek Cinema, October 1990 (Singapore Sling); Best Director Award, Thessaloniki International Film Festival's Greek State Film Awards, November 2002 (The Loser Takes It All)

Nikos Georgiou Nikolaidis (Greek: Νίκος Γεωργίου Νικολαΐδης; 25 October 1939 – 5 September 2007) was a Greek film director, screenwriter, film producer, writer, theatre director, assistant director, record producer, television director, and commercial director. He is usually considered a representative of European avant-garde and experimental art film.

== Biography ==
Nikolaidis was born on 25 October 1939 in Athens, Greece, where he lived and worked all his life. He was also the scriptwriter and producer of the movies which he directed and would occasionally, as in the case of the 1965 Orestis Laskos film Praktores 005 enantion Hrysopodarou, write screenplays for other directors. For much of his life he worked in advertising and he managed to direct two hundred television advertisements within twenty years. He studied filmmaking at the Hellenic Cinema and Television School Stavrakos and acquired scenic design skills at the Vakalo College of Art and Design, a highly regarded specialized private art school, both located in Athens, Greece. In 1960 he began to work as a first assistant director for Vasilis Georgiadis and in 1962 he directed his first short film Lacrimae Rerum. His directorial feature-length debut was Euridice BA 2037 which premiered at the Thessaloniki Festival of Greek Cinema on 29 September 1975 where it won the Best Director Award, the Greek National Ministry of Culture Award, and the Athens Film Critics Association Best Picture Award. Despite a lukewarm reaction by viewers, critics appreciated the innovative perspective on the classic Greek tragedy of Orpheus and Eurydice and noted the originality of Nikolaidis' artistic techniques. Nikolaidis himself believed Euridice BA 2037 to be his best film.

For his next picture, The Wretches Are Still Singing (1979), the director studied the transformation of social values using the example of a group of five friends who meet after a long separation and share with each other the details of their difficult lives. The film became the symbol of the 1950s generation and reflected his personal views on the problem of alienation in the modern world. The film was shot in a surreal way with a predilection for the aesthetics of the Marquis de Sade. In it, for the first time in Nikolaidis' filmography, one can see the characteristic elements of film noir which became part and parcel of Nikolaidis' unique approach in the majority of the films that followed. Today he is probably best known for his 1990 magnum opus Singapore Sling, a bizarre mix of film noir and horror with sex being used as a power game. Despite his long career as a film director in his home country which stretches to the early 1960s he was almost entirely unknown outside Greece before the early 1990s and is still less known outside it and it was only with this film, which has immediately achieved cult status, that international fame came to him. From his cinematic works, he further directed Sweet Bunch (1983), Morning Patrol (1987), See You in Hell, My Darling (1999), and The Loser Takes It All (2002). He also published a collection of short stories and wrote three novels, including The Angry Balkan (1977) which has been reprinted many times in Greece. In addition to his career as a filmmaker, theatre director, and writer, Nikolaidis also worked at a recording studio.

His films have often divided viewers and critics alike. Due to his methods of filmmaking, screenwriting, et cetera, as well as the themes his films usually deal with, being in stark contrast to standard mainstream ones, his films have received very little publicity though some, especially his lesser known ones, became cult films, both inside and outside Greece. The characters in his films are usually people constrained by limitations or found in absurd and extreme situations while playing with their fate. The themes that one often encounters in his films include the 1950s and film noir, the relationship between sex and death, companionship and love, as well as the struggle against all sorts of powers and ghosts from the past. Nikolaidis filmed much of his work in black and white, a few of his films contained a certain similarity to so-called "trash films," and he categorized the majority of his films into trilogies. As an example of the last tendency, the "Years of Cholera" trilogy which deals with the last decades of the twentieth century begins with The Wretches Are Still Singing (1979), continues with Sweet Bunch (1983), and ends with The Loser Takes It All (2002).

In November 2005, after the completion of his last film The Zero Years, a tale of perversion and sexual dominance which failed to replicate the earlier success of Singapore Sling (1990), Nikolaidis declared his intention to stop making movies in order to deal with music.

From 1970 on, he lived with Marie-Louise Bartholomew with whom he had two children. She was also either the producer or at least involved in the production of all his eight feature films and two hundred advertisements.

He died on 5 September 2007, aged 67, of pulmonary edema in Athens, Greece. The Thessaloniki International Film Festival held a retrospective in his honor during its tribute program in November 2007 and the Greek Film Archive paid tribute to him between 26 May and 1 June 2011 by projecting his eight feature films. To this day he remains the only Greek filmmaker who was ever awarded the Best Director Award at the Thessaloniki Festival of Greek Cinema or at the Thessaloniki International Film Festival's Greek State Film Awards five times.

== Legacy ==
The work of Nikos Nikolaidis has had a significant influence on the subsequent generation of Greek filmmakers some of which were inspired by the stylistics of his films and the unusual artistic images containing complex allegories and symbols. His films' protagonists are usually outcasts and nonconformists or the cynics and the marginalized people of society with mental and sexual disorders. The main feature of Nikolaidis' directorial approach was the predominance of form over content. At home, he was seen as an innovator looking for unusual ways to use film language, as well as someone who created a unique aesthetic combining beauty and ugliness. Abroad, Nikolaidis earned a reputation as an eccentric and controversial director. His influence extends abroad too. Ihor Podolchak's 2013 film Delirium was compared by Ukrainian film critics to the works of Nikolaidis after its prerelease screenings.

== Filmography ==
- Lacrimae Rerum (Latin: Tears of Things) (1962, Short Film)
- Anev Oron (Άνευ Όρων – Unconditionally) (1968, Short Film)
- Euridice BA 2037 (Ευριδίκη ΒΑ 2037) (1975, Feature Film)
- Ta Kourelia Tragoudane Akoma... (Τα Κουρέλια Τραγουδάνε Ακόμα... – The Wretches Are Still Singing) (1979, Feature Film)
- Glykia Symmoria (Γλυκιά Συμμορία – Sweet Bunch) (1983, Feature Film)
- Proini Peripolos (Πρωϊνή Περίπολος – Morning Patrol) (1987, Feature Film)
- Singapore Sling: O Anthropos pou Agapise ena Ptoma (Singapore Sling: Ο Άνθρωπος που Αγάπησε ένα Πτώμα – Singapore Sling) (1990, Feature Film)
- To koritsi me tis valitses (Το κορίτσι με τις βαλίτσες – Girl with Suitcases) (1994, Television Film)

Nikolaidis used to characterize this television film as "a mistake" for the following reason: "Mistakes are like failed love affairs – you reminisce about them, tortured by the fact that they were never fulfilled, but you wouldn't ever wish to relive them again... Bearing the reality, that the televised screening of this 'mistake' movie, received a viewing of 57.6%, only proves how big my mistake was."

- Tha se Do stin Kolasi Agapi mou (Θα σε Δω στην Κόλαση Αγάπη μου – See You in Hell, My Darling) (1999, Feature Film)
- O chamenos ta pairnei ola (Ο χαμένος τα παίρνει όλα – The Loser Takes It All) (2002, Feature Film)
- The Zero Years (2005, Feature Film)

== Bibliography ==
- Oi tymvorychoi: Diigimata 1962–1965 (Οι τυμβωρύχοι: Διηγήματα 1962–1965 – The Gravediggers: Short Stories 1962–1965) (Αθήνα: Ιδιωτική Έκδοση, 1966, ISBN 9609515037) (in Greek)
- O orgismenos Valkanios: Mythistorima (Ο οργισμένος Βαλκάνιος: Μυθιστόρημα – The Angry Balkan: A Novel) (Αθήνα: Εκδόσεις Κέδρος, 1977, ISBN 9600301956) (in Greek)
- Ta Kourelia Tragoudane Akoma...: Senario (Τα Κουρέλια Τραγουδάνε Ακόμα...: Σενάριο – The Wretches Are Still Singing: A Screenplay) (Αθήνα: Εκδόσεις Γνώση, 1980) (in Greek)
- Glykia Symmoria: Senario (Γλυκιά Συμμορία: Σενάριο – Sweet Bunch: A Screenplay) (Αθήνα: Συντεχνία, 1984) (in Greek)
- Gourounia ston Anemo: Mythistorima (Γουρούνια στον Άνεμο: Μυθιστόρημα – Pigs in the Wind: A Novel) (Αθήνα: Εκδόσεις Καστανιōτη, 1992, ISBN 960030985X) (in Greek)
- O chamenos ta pairnei ola: Senario (Ο χαμένος τα παίρνει όλα: Σενάριο – The Loser Takes It All: A Screenplay) (Αθήνα: Εκδόσεις Αιγόκερως, 2003, ISBN 9603221821) (in Greek)
- (Ο Συμεών στον Άδη: Νουβέλα) (Ανέκδοτη)
- (Ιούλιος: Νουβέλα) (Ανέκδοτη)

=== Posthumous ===
- Mia stekia sto mati tou Montezouma: Mythistorima (Μιά στεκιά στό μάτι τού Μοντεζούμα: Μυθιστόρημα – A Hit in the Eye of Montezuma: A Novel) (New York City: Greek Works, 2008, ISBN 0974766097) (in Greek)

== Awards ==
- Best Director Award, Greek National Ministry of Culture Award, Athens Film Critics Association Best Picture Award, Thessaloniki Festival of Greek Cinema, September 1975 (Euridice BA 2037)
- Best Director Award, Athens Film Critics Association Best Picture Award, Thessaloniki Festival of Greek Cinema, September 1979 (The Wretches Are Still Singing)
- Athens Film Critics Association Best Picture Award, Thessaloniki Festival of Greek Cinema, October 1983 (Sweet Bunch)
- Best Director Award, Greek National Ministry of Culture Award, Thessaloniki Festival of Greek Cinema, October 1987 (Morning Patrol)
- Best Director Award, Best Quality Film Award, Thessaloniki Festival of Greek Cinema, October 1990 (Singapore Sling)
- Best Director Award, Thessaloniki International Film Festival's Greek State Film Awards, November 2002 (The Loser Takes It All)
