= Panos Michalopoulos =

Greek actor

- Born: Panayiotis Michalopoulos; 15 January 1949 (age 77); Kalamata, Greece
- Years active: 1977–present
- Spouse: Roula Koromila (1988–1990)

Panos Michalopoulos (Greek: Παναγιώτης (Πάνος) Μιχαλόπουλος; born 15 January 1949) is a Greek actor, who has appeared during the last three decades in movies and television series.

== Selected filmography ==
=== Films ===
- Iphigenia (1977)
- Enas kontos tha mas sosei (1981)
- Garsoniera gia deka (1981)
- Ta Tsakalia (1981)
- Vasika kalispera sas (1982)
- I Strofi (1982)
- Peraste, filiste, teliosate! (1986)
- Roz gatos (1986)
- Pano kato ke plagios (1993)

=== Television ===
- Vaincre à Olympie (1977)
- Fovos kai pathos (1990)
- Tmima ithon (1992)
- Pirasmos (1995)
- Palirroia (1996)
- Dada gia oles tis douleies (1998)
- Gia mia gynaika kai ena aftokinito (2001)
- Ta Filarakia (2002)
- I Ora i kali (2004)
- Ta koritsia tou baba (2007)
- S'agapao...parkare (2009)
