= Takis Vougiouklakis =

Greek theatre director (1939–2021)

Panagiotis "Takis" Vougiouklakis (Greek: Παναγιώτης (Τάκης) Βουγιουκλάκης; 6 March 1939 – 8 April 2021) was a Greek director and producer.

== Biography ==
Vougiouklakis was born in Athens and is the relative of the former prefectural leader of Arcadia, judge Ioannis Vougiouklakis and Aimilis Koumoundourou.

He was the brother of Aliki Vougiouklaki.

He began and finished his studies in Rome, Italy and began at the Pro Deo University where he studied and went on to work as a director at the Centro Sperimentale di Cinematografia (CSC).

In his first vocational step, he worked as second unit director, next to the best Greek and foreign directors of the Golden Age of Greek film. He effectively directed in 1963, began his radio directors for 40 theatrical works and then in television with many serials, shows and celebrated programs. He began directing films in 1970.

His next artwork tribunes were the theatrical script anevazondas and 52 musicals, comedies, dramas, etc. by 2008. In 1975 he became a show businessman.

He ran a movie production and theatrical companies and television programming.

He was BD member of Arma Thespidos (National Theatrical Stage) for three years as General Μanager.

He worked as a consultant for the Ministry of Culture. For several years, he was a member of the Critics Commission at the Thessaloniki Film Festival. He was councillor of ANT1 TV station and general commissioner of the Intellectual Property of Writers and Directors. He was elected Public Councillor of the municipality of Vrilissia; he became president of the city's Cultural Center. He was elected again and became president of that municipality's public council.

Vougiouklakis died on 8 April 2021 at the age of 82.

== Filmography ==
Year	Film	Transliteration and translation	Role
1956	A Girl With Tales | Το Κορίτσι με τα Παραμύθια (To Koritsi me ta Paramythia	director	
1958	To Trellokoritso	Το Τρελλοκόριτσο (The Terrible Girl)	director
1959	O Ilias tou 16ou	Ο Ηλίας του 16ου (Ilias XVI)	director
1959	Astero	Αστέρω	director
1960	Mavrokostei ke Kondogiorgides	Μακρυκωσταίοι και Κοντογιώργηδες	director
1964	Three Girls From America	(Tria Koritsia apo tin Americ(k)a)	director
1964	I Soferina	Η Σωφερίνα	director
1965	Moderna Stachtopouta	Μοντέρνα Σταχτοπούτα	director
1965	I de Gyni na fotive ton Andra	Η δε Γυνή να φοβήται τον Άνδρα	director
1966	Diplopenies	Διπλοπενιές	director
1967	Oh! That Wife of Mine	Αχ! Αυτή η Γυναίκα μου (Ah! Afti t Gynaika mou)	producer
1967	Oedipus Rex	Οιδίπους Τύραννος (Idipos Tyrannos)	producer
1968	Randevou me mia Agnosti	Ραντεβού με μια Άγνωστη	producer
1968	Operation Apollo	Επιχείρησις Απόλλων	producer
1969	Thymissou Agapi Mou	Θυμήσου Αγάπη μου	producer
1969	I orgi tou Adikimenou	Η Οργή του Αδικημένου	producer
1969	The Student With Blonde Hair	Η Δασκάλα με τα ξανθά Μαλλιά (I daskala me ta xantha mallia)	producer
1969	The Countess of the Kitchen	Η Αρχόντισσα της Κουζίνας (I arhontissa tis kouzinas)	artworker
1970	Ena asteio koritsi	Ένα αστείο Κορίτσι	director
1971	I Love You	Σ` αγαπώ	director
1972	I Aliki diktator	Η Αλίκη Δικτάτωρ (Aliki the Dictator)	director
1981	Kataskopos Nelly	Κατάσκοπος Νέλη	director
1983	Iron Maid	Σιδηρά Κυρία (Sidira Ky(i)ria)	director
1984	Αν ήταν το Βιολί Πουλί	An itan to violi pouli (If my violin was a bird)	director
1985	O agkalitsas	Ο Αγκαλίτσας	director
