= The Guardian's Son =

- Directed by: Dimitris Koutsiabasakos
- Written by: Dimitris Koutsiabasakos
- Starring: Nikolas Aggelis; Apostolis Totsikas; Dimitris Tzoumakis; Eleni Vergeti
- Cinematography: Odysseas Pavlopoulos
- Edited by: Spyros Kokkas
- Music by: Vangelis Fampas
- Release date: November 22, 2006
- Country: Greece
- Language: Greek

The Guardian's Son (Greek: Ο γιος του φύλακα) is a Greek film directed by Dimitris Koutsiabasakos. It released in 2006 and it stars Nikolas Aggelis, Apostolis Totsikas, Dimitris Tzoumakis and Eleni Vergeti. The film won the second best film award and the best first film director award in the Greek State Film Awards. The film was shot in the Aspropotamos area, in the Pindus range.

== Plot ==
Markos, an ambitious journalist, travels to an almost deserted village in the Pindus mountains, looking for some work tool. There, he befriends with the few permanent residents of the village, the family of the village guardian and two young brothers who have come to the village to run away from their problem in the city. The four young people make a good relationship and help Ilias, the guardian's son, to a mission that he had drawn.

== Cast ==
- Nikolas Aggelis
- Apostolis Totsikas
- Dimitris Tzoumakis
- Eleni Vergeti
- Yiorgos Spanias
- Nikos Zoiopoulos

== Awards ==
List of awards and nominations
Award	Category	Recipients and nominees	Result
2006 Greek State Film Awards	Second Best Film	Dimitris Koutsiabasakos	Won
2006 Greek State Film Awards	Best First Film Director	Dimitris Koutsiabasakos	Won
