= Dimitris Koutsiabasakos =

Greek director and filmmaker

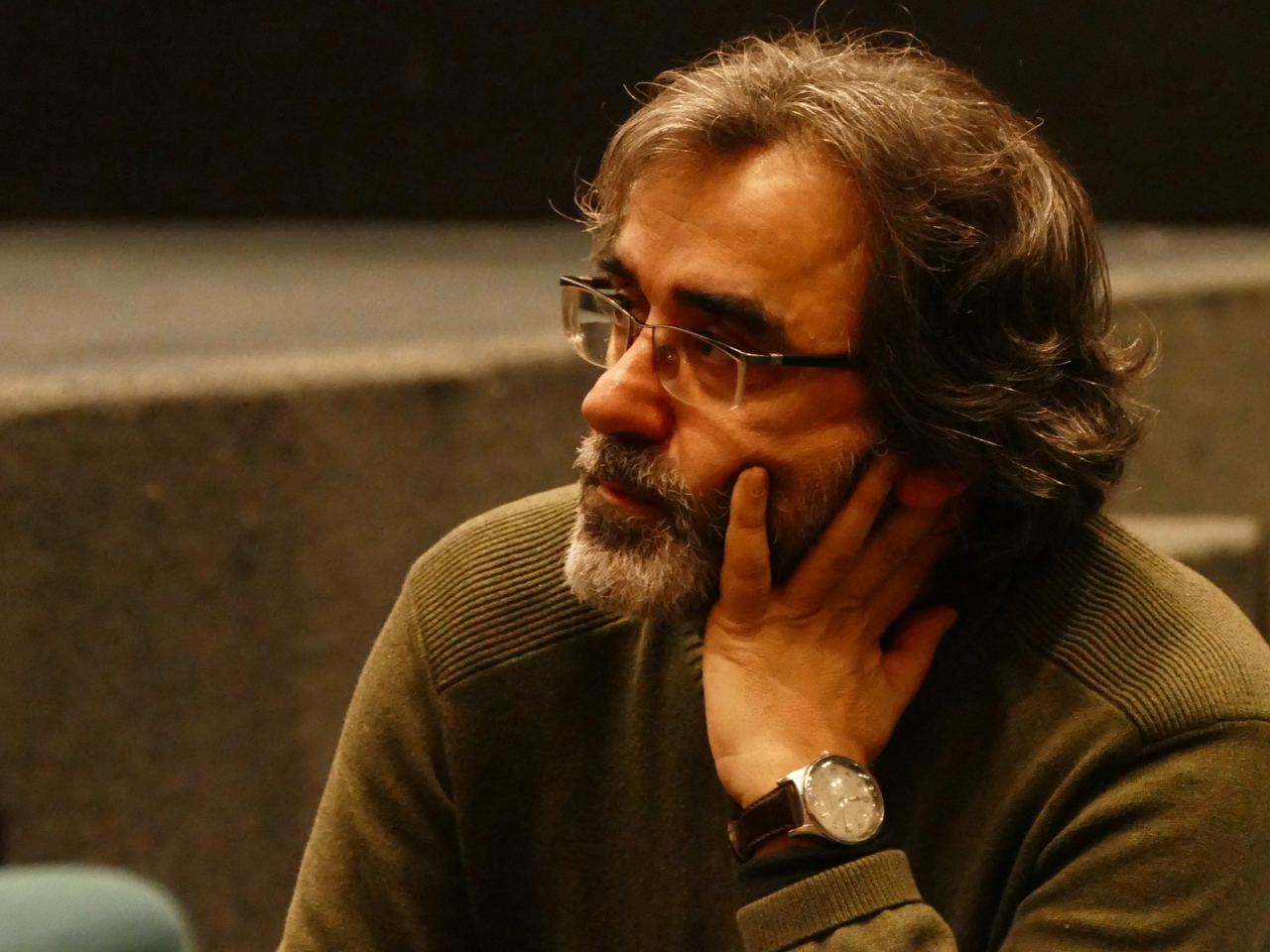
Dimitris Koutsiabasakos

Dimitris Koutsiabasakos is a Greek film director, writer, and independent producer, known for his documentaries, series, short and feature films. He was born in 1967 and studied movie and television direction at the Gerasimov Institute of Cinematography, in Moscow, Russia (V.G.I.K.).

Ηe has been teaching Film Acting Technique in Drama Schools, among them the Drama School of the National Theatre of Northern Greece. Ηe was a lecturer in the Department of Cultural Technology and Communication of the University of the Aegean and film director in the Hellenic Broadcasting Corporation, ERT S.A.

In 2018 he was elected to the position of associate professor of Film Directing at the School of Film in the Art Faculty of the Aristotle University of Thessaloniki. His work has been critically acclaimed and has received national and international awards.

== Selected filmography ==
2020 - Daniel ’16 - feature film

2020 - The weavers, documentary feature

2019 - Heracles, Acheloos and Mesochora, 82’, documentary

2017 - Yannis Kastritsis-The man and his shadow - documentary feature

2016 - Silent Witness - documentary feature

2014 - Becoming an Actor - documentary feature

2013 - The Grocer-documentary feature

2001 - Frida - Video Dance

2006 - The Guardian's Son - feature film

1998 - Hill 33 - short film

1997 - Heracles, Acheloos and my Granny - short documentary

1995 - The Bridge - short film

1992 - My Beloved Ones - Short film
