= List of Greek films of the 1960s =

A list of notable films produced in Greece in the 1960s.

== 1960s ==
| Title | Director | Cast | Genre | Notes |
|---|---|---|---|---|
1960
| Never on Sunday (Pote Tin Kyriaki, Ποτέ την Κυριακή) | Jules Dassin | Melina Mercouri, Jules Dassin | Comedy drama | Won Oscar, +2 wins, +7 nominations IMDb Entered into the 1960 Cannes Film Festival |
| Our Last Spring | Michael Cacoyannis | | | 1 Award in Thessaloniki Film Festival; Entered into the 10th Berlin International Film Festival |
| Madalena (Μανταλένα) | Dinos Dimopoulos | Aliki Vougiouklaki, Dimitris Papamichael, Pantelis Zervos | Musical comedy | 3 Awards in Thessaloniki Film Festival; Entered into the 1961 Cannes Film Festival |
| Antio zoi (Αντίο Ζωή) | Orestis Laskos | Giorgos Fountas, Eleni Hajiargyri, Labros Konstadaras | Romantic drama | IMDb |
| Eglima sta paraskinia (Έγκλημα στα παρασκήνια) | Dinos Katsouridis | Alekos Alexandrakis, Maro Kontou, Christos Tsaganeas, Georges Sari, Lavrentis Dianellos, Sapfo Notara | Detective | IMDb |
| Kitrina gantia, Ta (Τα Κίτρινα Γάντια) | Alekos Sakellarios | Nikos Stavridis, Mimis Fotopoulos, Maro Kontou, Pantelis Zervos | Comedy | IMDb |
1961
| Antigone (Αντιγόνη) | Yorgos Javellas | Irene Papas, Manos Katrakis | Drama | 2 Awards in Thessaloniki Film Festival; Entered into the 11th Berlin International Film Festival |
| Exo oi kleftes (Έξω οι κλέφτες) | Kostas Andritsos | Orestis Makris, Dionysis Papagiannopoulos, Koulis Stoligkas | Comedy | IMDb |
| Hamena Oneira (Χαμένα Όνειρα) | Alekos Sakellarios | Antigoni Valakou, Dimitris Papamichael | Drama | IMDb |
| O Katiforos (Ο Κατήφορος) | Giannis Dalianidis | Zoe Laskari, Nikos Kourkoulos, Kostas Voutsas, Pantelis Zervos | Drama | IMDb |
| Iligos | Giannis Dalianidis | Zoe Laskari | Drama | |
| To exypno pouli | Orestis Laskos | Kostas Hatzichristos, Anna Fonsou | Comedy | |
1962
| Electra (Ηλέκτρα) | Michael Cacoyannis | Irene Papas, Giannis Fertis | Drama | Nominated for Oscar, +2 wins and entered into the 1962 Cannes Film Festival. - IMDb |
| Phaedra; Φαίδρα | Jules Dassin | Melina Mercouri, Anthony Perkins | Drama | Nominated for Oscar, +2 nom. French-Greek-USA co-production IMDb |
| Otan leipei i gata Όταν λείπει η γάτα | Alekos Sakellarios | Vasilis Avlonitis, Rena Vlahopoulou, Nikos Rizos, Marika Krevata, Giorgos Gavriilidis | Comedy | IMDb |
| O atsidas | Giannis Dalianidis | Dinos Iliopoulos | Comedy | |
| Nomos 4000 | Giannis Dalianidis | Zoe Laskari | Drama | |
1963
| The Red Lanterns (Ta Kokkina fanaria, Τα Κόκκινα Φανάρια) | Vassilis Georgiadis | Tzeni Karezi, Mary Chronopoulou, Dimitris Papamichael, Manos Katrakis | Drama | Nominated for Oscar and entered into the 1964 Cannes Film Festival |
| Mikres Aphrodites (Young Aphrodites, Μικρές Αφροδίτες) | Nikos Koundouros | Takis Emmanuel, Eleni Prokopiou | Drama | Koundouros won the Silver Bear for Best Director at Berlin; 3 Awards in Thessaloniki Film Festival |
| Glory Sky | Takis Kanellopoulos | | | Entered into the 1963 Cannes Film Festival |
| Kati na kaiei (Κάτι να καίει) | Yannis Dalianidis | Dinos Iliopoulos, Rena Vlahopoulou, Elena Nathanael, Kostas Voutsas | Musical comedy | IMDb |
| Merikoi to protimoun kryo (Μερικοί το προτιμούν κρύο) | Yannis Dalianidis | Dinos Iliopoulos, Zoe Laskari, Rena Vlahopoulou, Kostas Voutsas, Joly Garbi, Giannis Vogiatzis | Musical comedy | IMDb |
| Osa kryvei i nychta (Όσα κρύβει η νύχτα) | Stelios Zografakis | Petros Fyssoun, Martha Vourtsi, Dionyssis Papayannopoulos, Christos Tsaganeas, Nitsa Tsaganea | Drama | IMDb |
| Treloi polyteleias | Stefanos Fotiadis | Giorgos Pantzas | Comedy | |
1964
| Zorba the Greek (Αλέξης Ζορμπάς) | Michael Cacoyannis | Anthony Quinn, Alan Bates | Drama | English language; won 3 Oscars, +2 wins, +16 nom IMDb |
| Treason (Προδοσία) | Kostas Manoussakis | | | 2 Awards in Thessaloniki Film Festival; Entered into the 1965 Cannes Film Festival |
| Doloma, To (Το δόλωμα) | Alekos Sakellarios | Aliki Vougiouklaki, Alekos Alexandrakis | Romantic comedy | IMDb |
| Filos mou o Lefterakis, O (Ο φίλος μου ο Λευτεράκης) | Alekos Sakellarios | Dinos Iliopoulos, Maro Kontou, Kostas Voutsas, Christos Tsaganeas, Giorgos Konstadinou | Comedy | IMDb |
| Soferina, I (Η Σωφερίνα) | Alekos Sakellarios | Aliki Vougiouklaki, Alekos Alexandrakis, Maro Kontou, Vasilis Avlonitis, Dionysis Papagiannopoulos | Comedy | IMDb |
| Allos gia to ekatommyrio | Orestis Laskos | Mimis Fotopoulos, Giannis Gkionakis | Comedy | |
| I chartopaichtra | Giannis Dalianidis | Rena Vlahopoulou, Lambros Konstantaras | Comedy | |
1965
| And the Wife Shall Revere Her Husband (Η δε γυνή να φοβήται τον άντρα) | George Tzavellas | Giorgos Konstantinou, Maro Kontou | Comedy | 1 award in 1st Chicago International Film Festival |
| The Young Will Live | Nikos Tzimas | | | Entered into the 4th Moscow International Film Festival |
| Moderna stahtopouta (Μοντέρνα Σταχτοπούτα) | Alekos Sakellarios | Aliki Vougiouklaki, Dimitris Papamichael | Romantic comedy | IMDb |
| Praktores 005 enantion Hrysopodarou (Πράκτορες 005 εναντίον Χρυσοπόδαρου) | Orestis Laskos | Giannis Gkionakis, Costas Hajihristos | comedy | IMDb |
| Teddy boy agapi mou (Τέντυ μπόι αγάπη μου) | Giannis Dalianidis | Zoe Laskari, Kostas Voutsas | Comedy | IMDb |
| Istoria mias zois | Giannis Dalianidis | Zoe Laskari | Drama | |
| Kiss the Girls | Giannis Dalianidis | Rena Vlachopoulou | Comedy | |
1966
| To Homa vaftike kokkino (Το χώμα βάφτηκε κόκκινο) | Vasilis Georgiadis | Nikos Kourkoulos, Mary Chronopoulou, Giannis Voglis | Drama/Action | Nominated for Oscar IMDb |
| The Fear | Kostas Manoussakis | | | Entered into the 16th Berlin International Film Festival |
| Anthropos yia oles tis doulies (Άνθρωπος για όλες τις δουλειές) | Giorgos Konstadinou | Giorgos Konstantinou, Giannis Mihalopoulos | Comedy | IMDb |
| Oi kyries tis avlis (Οι κυρίες της αυλής) | Dinos Dimopoulos | Dinos Iliopoulos, Alekos Alexandrakis | Musical comedy | Top IMDb ratings - IMDb |
| Ah! Kai na 'moun antras | Stefanos Fotiadis | Maro Kontou | Comedy | |
1967
| Vortex | Nikos Koundouros | | | Entered into the 17th Berlin International Film Festival |
| Ah! Afti i gynaika mou (Αχ αυτή η γυναίκα μου) | George Skalenakis | Aliki Vougiouklaki, Dimitris Papamichael | Comedy | IMDb |
| Kalos ilthe to dollario (Καλώς ήλθε το δολάριο) | Alekos Sakellarios | Giorgos Konstadinou, Anna Kalouta, Sotiris Moustakas | Comedy | IMDb |
| Pare kosme (Πάρε κόσμε) | Errikos Thalassinos | Thanasis Veggos, Nitsa Tsaganea | Comedy | IMDb |
| Thalassies oi Hadres, Oi (Οι Θαλασσιές οι Χάντρες) | Giannis Dalianidis | Zoe Laskari, Kostas Voutsas, Martha Karagianni, Phaedon Georgitsis | Musical comedy | IMDb |
| Voitheia! O Vengos faneros praktor 000 (Βοήθεια! Ο Βέγγος φανερός πράκτωρ 000) | Thanasis Vengos | Thanasis Vengos, Zannino, Dimitris Nikolaidis, and Antonis Papadopoulos | comedy | IMDb |
| Bullets don't come back | Nikos Foskolos | Kostas Kazakos | Drama | |
1968
| Girls in the Sun | Vasilis Georgiadis | Giannis Voglis | Romantic | Nominated for Golden Globe; 3 Awards in Thessaloniki Film Festival |
| Imperiale | George Skalenakis | | | |
| Oikogeneia Horafa (Οικογένεια Χωραφά) | Costas Asimakopoulos | Alekos Alexandrakis, Maro Kontou | Comedy | IMDb |
| One Night for Love | Vasilis Georgiadis | Elena Nathanail | Drama | |
| Gorgones ke Manges | Giannis Dalianidis | Mary Chronopoulou | Comedy | |
1969
| Z | Costa-Gavras | Jean-Louis Trintignant, Yves Montand | Drama | The assassination of Gregoris Lambrakis; Algerian-French co-production; won 2 Oscars, +9 wins, +9 nom IMDb |
| Agonia (Αγωνία) | Odysseas Kosteletos | Tolis Voskopoulos, Eleni Anousaki, Lavrentis Dianellos | Drama | IMDb |
| Daskala me ta xantha mallia, I (Η δασκάλα με τα ξανθά μαλλιά) | Dinos Dimopoulos | Aliki Vougiouklaki, Dimitris Papamichael, Pantelis Zervos | War/Romance | IMDb |
| Ena asyllipto koroido (Ένα ασύλληπτο κορόιδο) | Odysseas Kosteletos | Tolis Voskopoulos | Drama | IMDb |
| Thou-Vou falakros praktor, epiheirisis "Yis Mathiam" (Θου-Βου Φαλακρός πράκτωρ: Επιχείρησις Γης Μαδιάμ) | Thanasis Vengos | Thanasis Vengos, Zannino, and Antonis Papadopoulos | Comedy | IMDb |
| I Pariziana (Η Παριζιάνα) | Giannis Dalianidis | Rena Vlahopoulou | Comedy | IMDb |
| Gymnoi sto dromo | Giannis Dalianidis | Nikos Kourkoulos | Drama | |
| Who is Thanassis | Thanasis Veggos | Thanasis Veggos | Comedy | |
