= Something Is Burning =

Something is Burning
- Greek: Κάτι να καίει
- Directed by: Giannis Dalianidis
- Starring: Dinos Iliopoulos; Rena Vlahopoulou
- Production company: Finos Film
- Release date: 13 January 1964
- Running time: 110 minutes
- Country: Greece
- Language: Greek

Something is Burning (Greek: Κάτι να καίει) is a 1964 Greek musical film directed by Giannis Dalianidis.

== Cast ==
- Dinos Iliopoulos – Dinos Exarhopoulos
- Rena Vlahopoulou – Sofia Frantzi
- Martha Karagianni – Rena
- Hloi Liaskou – Popi Frantzi
- Elena Nathanael – Jenny Petridi
- Christos Negas – Fanis
- Kostas Voutsas – Klearhos
- Christos Tsaganeas – Mr. Petridis
- Giorgos Tsitsopoulos – Lelos
- Elsa Rizou – Anna
- Yorgos Vrasivanopoulos – Kostas Hatzipateras
- Alekos Tzanetakos – Sotiris
- Tolis Voskopoulos – Petros
- Angelos Mavropoulos - Hatzipateras
- Periklis Christoforidis - Nikolaidis
- Errikos Kontarinis - Athanasiou
- Kostas Papachristos - Apostolis
- Giorgos Velentzas - receptionist
- Babis Anthopoulos - Dinos Exarhopoulos
- Giannis Vogiatzis - man in the audience
