= Merikoi to protimoun kryo =

Some Like it Cool
- Greek: Μερικοί το προτιμούν κρύο
- Directed by: Giannis Dalianidis
- Written by: Giannis Dalianidis
- Produced by: The Roussopoulos Brothers
- Starring: Dinos Iliopoulos; Zoe Laskari; Rena Vlachopoulou; Vangelis Voulgaridis; Kostas Voutsas; Martha Karagianni; Chloi Liaskou; Joly Garbi; Kostas Doukas
- Music by: Mimis Plessas
- Distributed by: Finos Films
- Release date: January 10, 1963
- Running time: 87 minutes
- Country: Greece
- Language: Greek

Merikoi to protimoun kryo (Greek: Greek: Μερικοί το προτιμούν κρύο) translations: Some Like it Cool is a 1963 Greek comedy film directed by Giannis Dalianidis. Lakis (Dinos Iliopoulos), Rena (Rena Vlachopoulou), Eva (Zoi Laskari) and Mary (Chloi Liaskou) are four siblings that were secretly in relationships with Lela (Martha Karagianni), Thodoros (Giannis Vogiatzis), Giorgis (Vangelis Voulgaridis) and Kleopa (Kostas Voutsas), respectively.

== Plot ==
Lakis has three sisters, two younger and one older, who have to be married before he can marry his girlfriend Lela. On a summer excursion, the younger ones meet two boys and begin an affair. Unaware of that, their elderly father tries to find a suitor for his older daughter Rena.

== Cast ==
- Rena Vlachopoulou .... Rena Angelou
- Giannis Vogiatzis .... Thodoros
- Vangelis Voulgaridis .... Giorgos
- Kostas Voutsas .... Kleopas
- Joly Garbi .... mother Angelou
- Kostas Doukas .... father Angelou
- Dinos Iliopoulos .... Lakis Angelou
- Martha Karagianni .... Lela
- Zoi Laskari .... Eva Angelou
- Chloi Liaskou .... Mary Angelou
- Periklis Christoforidis .... Fedon
- Giorgos Konstantinou .... Tryfon
- Nikitas Platis .... Thanasis Nikolaidis
- Dimitris Kallivokas .... Lakis's colleague
- Alekos Tzanetakos .... young man

== Trivia ==
The movie made 212,247 tickets.

- It was Giannis Dalianidis' first musical
- Finos Films mainly did not want to star Rena Vlachopoulou in a cast that she did not made a trade, her talent that opened her great career
- The title of the movie comes from the opposite form of the 1959 American movie Some Like It Hot
