= Kiss the Girls (1965 film) =

1965 Greek film by Giannis Dalianidis

- Greek: Κορίτσια για φίλημα
- Directed by: Giannis Dalianidis
- Produced by: Giannis Dalianidis
- Starring: Zoi Laskari; Rena Vlachopoulou; Martha Karagianni; Chloi Liaskou; Kostas Voutsas; Andreas Douzos; Giannis Vogiatzis
- Distributed by: Finos Film
- Release date: January 25, 1965
- Running time: 88 minutes
- Country: Greece
- Language: Greek

Kiss the Girls (Greek: Κορίτσια για φίλημα, romanized: Koritsia gia filima) is a Greek film produced by Finos Film in 1965. It is written and directed by Giannis Dalianidis.

The lead Rena (Rena Vlachopoulou), a manager at a Greek tourist office in New York City, goes to Greece with her cousin Jeny (Zoi Laskari).

This is the first movie produced and projected with a stereo sound system in Greece, at the Attikon cinema. Attikon was the only theater that could play the movie with stereophonic sound.

The movie sold 619,236 tickets in Greece.

== Cast ==
- Zoi Laskari as Jeny
- Rena Vlachopoulou as Rena Eleftheriou
- Martha Karagianni as Martha
- Chloi Liaskou as Efi Ramoglou
- Kostas Voutsas as Kostas Kaliakoudas
- Andreas Douzos as Andreas Ramoglou
- Giannis Vogiatzis as Jim Pappas
- Alekos Tzanetakos as Alekos Grigoriadis
- Giorgos Gavriilidis as Petros Ramoglou
- Periklis Christoforidis as Giorgos Eleftheriou
- Giorgos Vrasivanopoulos as Paul
- Angelos Mavropoulos as the judge
