= Liar Wanted =

- Greek: Ζητείται ψεύτης
- Directed by: Giannis Dalianidis
- Written by: Dimitris Psathas
- Starring: Dinos Iliopoulos; Pantelis Zervos; Thanassis Vengos; Martha Karagianni; Dimitris Nikolaidis; Periklis Christoforidis; Angelos Mavropoulos
- Music by: Gerasimos Lavranos
- Distributed by: Klearchos Konitsiotis, Finos Films
- Release date: 17 April 1961
- Running time: 82 minutes
- Country: Greece
- Language: Greek

Liar Wanted (Greek: Ζητείται ψεύτης) is a 1961 Greek comedy film made by Finos Films, based on the same named theatrical work of Dimitris Psathas. It was directed by Giannis Dalianidis and starring Dinos Iliopoulos, Pantelis Zervos, Thanassis Vengos and Periklis Christoforidis.

== Plot ==
Theodoros Parlas, known as the Pseftothodoros (the Lying-Theodoros) is a vocational liar. He comes from his village to Athens in search for work. A lucky fight on a bus opens a road to his shining career.

== Cast ==
- Dinos Iliopoulos ..... Theodoros Parlas
- Pantelis Zervos ..... Theofilos Ferekis
- Anna Kyriakou ..... Jenny Fereki
- Martha Karagianni ..... Pitsa Kitsa
- Thanasis Veggos ..... Vrasidas
- Periklis Christoforidis ..... Agisilaos
- Panagiotis Karavousianos ..... Patatias
- Margarita Athanasiou ..... Pipitsa
- Popi Lazou ..... Zozo
- Dimitris Nikolaidis ..... Panagis Dervisis
- Angelos Mavropoulos ..... Maratos

== See also ==
- List of Greek films
