= The Downfall (1961 film) =

The Downhill
- Greek: Ο Κατήφορος
- Directed by: Giannis Dalianidis
- Written by: Giannis Dalianidis
- Starring: Zoe Laskari; Nikos Kourkoulos; Vangelis Voulgaridis; Pantelis Zervos; Kostas Voutsas; Mirka Kalatzopoulou; Nitsa Marouda; Eleni Zafeirou
- Cinematography: Nikos Dimopoulos
- Edited by: Petros Lykas
- Music by: Kostas Kapnisis
- Distributed by: Finos Films
- Release date: December 2, 1961
- Running time: 104 minutes
- Country: Greece
- Language: Greek

The Downfall (Greek: O Katiforos, Greek: Ο Κατήφορος) is a 1961 Greek drama film made by Finos Films. It was directed by Giannis Dalianidis and starring Zoi Laskari, Nikos Kourkoulos, Vangelis Voulgaridis and Pantelis Zervos.

The movie made 161,331 tickets first class cinemas in Athens and Piraeus.

== Plot ==
A group of Greek youngster in the early 1960s, lead their lives ignoring their parents. Three of them are: Rea (Zoe Laskari), whose parents do not pay much attention to the carefree way of life she leads, Costas (Nikos Kourkoulos), Rea's boyfriend, who comes from a broken home and is secretly engaging in love affairs with other girls and Petros (Vangelis Voulgaridis), who is a kind and gentle person and is also in love with Rea. Their main concern is the same as most of the 1960s youngsters, i.e. going to parties where we can see the decadent way in which they have fun (passionate dancing, kissing, striptease etc.). A few days later, Rea learns about Costas' promiscuous life, dumps him and decides to have an affair with Petros. Costas, in order to get his revenge, arranges a meeting in a park where he abandons her naked. After humiliating her like that, he has an affair with her sister, Lena (Mirka Kalantzopoulou). Rea gets furious and wanting to protect her sister from that evil person, kills him. She is led to court, where her attorney is her own father, and after a very long trial, Lena reveals the true reason the crime took place, an action that helps Rea get a lighter sentence.

== Cast ==
- Zoe Laskari .... Rea Nikolaou
- Nikos Kourkoulos .... Kostas Petrakis
- Vangelis Voulgaridis .... Petros Kyriazopoulos
- Pantelis Zervos .... Leonidas Nikolaou
- Kostas Voutsas .... Bisbiras
- Mirka Kalatzopoulou .... Lena Nikolaou
- Nitsa Marouda .... Maria Siaka
- Eleni Zafeirou .... Elizabeth Nikolaou
- Periklis Christoforidis .... Filippas Kyriazopoulos
- Angelos Mavropoulos .... judge
- Lavrentis Dianellos .... Sotiris Siakas

== Trivia ==
- The film marked Zoe Laskari's debut in cinema.
- The role of protagonist was offered to Aliki Vougiouklaki but she turned it down due to the nude scenes.
- Zoe Laskari poses as a threat to Aliki Vougiouklaki's vast popularity.
- The film boosted Nikos Kourkoulos's Kostas Voutsas's and Vangelis Voulgaridis's popularity.
- The movie reached number one at the Greek box office that year.
- After the movie Zoe Laskari signed an exclusive contract with Finos Films her being paid every month.
- The movie was screened worldwide and was number one in the box-office in Mexico during the season 1962-63 and was played for 57 consecutive weeks in the cinemas of Mexico City.
- The movie was due to be shown at the 1961 Thessaloniki Film Festival, but Filopimin Finos withdrew it (along with two others) because he didn't agree with the festival schedule.
- The success of the movie led to more films dealing with the issues of the so-called "raging youth" and "teddy boys" (punks) to be produced in the Greek cinema.

== See also ==
- List of Greek films
