= Martha Karagianni =

Greek film actress (1939–2022)

Martha Karagianni (Greek: Μάρθα Καραγιάννη; 6 November 1939 – 18 September 2022) was a Greek television, theatre and film actress. She was born in Piraeus and raised in Keratsini. She was one of the most popular Greek actresses of the 1960s. She starred in many films, 19 of which were produced by Finos Film. She had a relationship with Dimitrios Stefanakos, and she was married to Vasilis Konstantinou for many years.

== Biography ==
Martha Karagianni was one of the most famous and talented actresses of the classic Greek cinema. Her parents were of Pontic origin. Her mother, Domna Tsiridou, was born in Baku, Azerbaijan and her father, Charilaos Karagiannis, was born in Krasnontar, Russia. Martha was born in Pireaus, Greece and grew up in Keratsini.

She completed her studies in dance. From the age of 8 years old she began performing in the Greek National Opera as a member of Loukia Sakellariou's-Kotsopoulou's children's ballet, alongside with Eleni Prokopiou.

In 1955, she made her film debut at the age of 16 in Finos Film's Madame X., directed by Orestis Laskos.

Two years later, in 1957, she also made her theatre debut in the revue Elephants and Fleas, where she met the famous Greek film director Giannis Dalianidis. She later worked with the musical theater producer Vasilis Bournelis in Akropol Theatre.

She made her first appearance on television in the TV series O dromos in 1977.

She died in Athens on 18 September 2022, at the age of 82, after suffering a stroke.

== Films ==
- Madame X (1956) ..... Eleni
- Liar Wanted (1961) ..... Pitsa-Kitsa
- Exo oi kleftes (1961) ..... Margarita
- Merikoi to protimoun kryo (1963) ..... Lela
- Something Is Burning (1964) ..... Rena
- Kiss the Girls (1965) ..... Martha
- Oi Thalassies oi Hadres (1967) ..... Eleni
- Gorgones ke Manges (1968) ..... Marina
- Marijuana Stop! (1971) ..... Despoina
- Pethaino gia sena (2009) ..... grandmother
