= O atsidas =

1962 film

The Wise Guy
- Greek: Ο ατσίδας
- Directed by: Giannis Dalianidis
- Written by: Giannis Dalianidis
- Starring: Dinos Iliopoulos; Zoi Laskari; Vangelis Protopappas; Mairi Voulgari; Pantelis Zervos; Stefanos Stratigos; Joly Garbi; Golfo Bini; Kostas Papachristos; Thanassis Vengos
- Music by: Gerasimos Lavranos
- Distributed by: Finos Films
- Release date: 15 January 1962
- Running time: 83 minutes
- Country: Greece
- Language: Greek

O atsidas (Greek: Ο ατσίδας) is a 1962 Greek comedy film directed by Giannis Dalianidis and starring Dinos Iliopoulos, Zoi Laskari and Vangelis Protopappas.

== Synopsis ==
It has a lovely entanglement for the first, which he asked his brother of the lovely lady that they did not marry, they were first that they prepared to recover his brother.

== Cast ==
- Dinos Iliopoulos as Alekos Kourouzos
- Zoi Laskari as Anna Kourouzou
- Pantelis Zervos as Thodoros Kourouzos
- Joly Garbi as Areti Kourouzou
- Mairi Voulgari as Voula Mavrofrydi
- Vangelis Protopappas as Grigoris Mavrofrydis
- Thanassis Vengos as Thrasyvoulas
- Kostas Papachristos as Grigoris's girlfriend brother
- Photographic portions of the movie were done by Dinos Iliopoulos, Mairi Linda and Manolis Chiotis.

== Other information ==
- The movie is based on a theatrical play by Dimitris Psathas Exohikon Kendron o Eros (Εξοχικόν Κέντρον Ο Έρως)
- Thanassis Vengos made his second role, he unfolded his comical talents and became popular.
- The movie was filmed in Thessaloniki
- It was annually ranked fifth in tickets (69,414) for that year.
