= I hartopaihtra =

1964 film

- Greek: Η χαρτοπαίχτρα
- Directed by: Giannis Dalianidis
- Written by: Giannis Dalianidis
- Starring: Rena Vlachopoulou; Lambros Konstantaras; Kostas Voutsas; Hloi Liaskou; Lili Papagianni; Sapfo Notara; Yorgos Vrasivanopoulos; Periklis Hristoforidis; Nassos Kedrakas; Angelos Mavropoulos; Nikos Feramas; Nikitas Platis; Yannis Bertos
- Music by: Mimis Flessas
- Distributed by: Finos Films
- Release date: 1964
- Running time: 94 minutes
- Country: Greece
- Language: Greek

I hartopaichtra (Greek: Η χαρτοπαίχτρα, The Card Player) is a 1964 Greek black-and-white comedy film starring Rena Vlachopoulou and Lambros Konstantaras. The film sold 534,086 tickets in Athens.

== Plot ==
Aleka (Rena Vlahopoulou), a middle-aged lady married to a businessman (Lambros Konstantaras), is obsessed with gambling. Her husband and children make several attempts to curb her excessive card playing, which has started to affect her family and her economic status.

== Cast ==
- Rena Vlahopoulou ..... Aleka Oikonomidi
- Lambros Konstantaras ..... Andreas Oikonomidis
- Kostas Voutsas ..... Lakis Oikonomidis
- Lili Papagianni ..... Lele
- Sapfo Notara ..... Marigo
- Chloe Liaskou ..... Nina Oikonomidi
- Giorgos Vrasivanopoulos ..... Giannakis
- Angelos Mavropoulos ..... general
- Nikos Fermas ..... Vangos Kapsouris
- Nikitas Platis ..... Paminos Stravokanis
- Nassos Kedrakas ..... Nikolopoulos
- Raphael Denogias ..... Evangelopoulos
- Giannis Bertos ..... doctor

== Other ==
- Photographer: Nikos Dimopoulos
- Operator: Vassilis Vassiliadis
- Music: Mimis Plessas
- Presenter: Petros Lykas
- Scenic producer: Markos Zervas
- Make-up: Nikos Xepapadakos
- Audio: Giannis Fisher
- Style: Markos Zervas
- Dancers: Fotis Metaxopoulos, Viky Tzinieri
- Associate producer: Markos Zervas
- Machine audio: G. Mihaloudis

== See also ==
- List of Greek films
