= Iligos =

- Greek: Ίλιγγος
- Directed by: Giannis Dalianidis
- Written by: Giannis Dalianidis
- Starring: Zoi Laskari; Alexandros Alexandrakis; Voula Zouboulaki; Faidon Georgitsis; Alekos Tzanetakos; Lefteris Vournas; Ilya Livykou; Katerina Helmi; Malena Anoussaki
- Music by: MIMIS PLESSAS
- Distributed by: Mask Films
- Release date: November 18, 1963
- Running time: 90 minutes
- Country: Greece
- Language: Greek

Iligos or Ilingos (Greek: Ίλιγγος) is a 1963 Greek black and white drama film directed and written by Giannis Dalianidis. It stars Zoi Laskari and Alekos Alexandrakis.

== Plot ==
Elli (Zoi Laskari) leaves home for a reason that the absolutist father (Alekos Alexandros) approached romantically. They started a rashly life.

== Cast ==
- Zoi Laskari ..... Elli Kapralou
- Alekos Alexandrakis ..... Nikos
- Voula Zouboulaki ..... Kaiti Kapralou
- Phaedon Georgitsis ..... Kostas Panagiotopoulos
- Alekos Tzanetakos ..... Fotis
- Lefteris Vournas ..... Giorgos
- Ilya Livykou ..... Olga Panagiotopoulou
- Katerina Helmi ..... Litsa
- Malena Anoussaki ..... Giorgos's mother
- Angelos Mavropoulos ..... Panagiotis Panagiotopoulos

== See also ==
- List of Greek films
