= A Tank... in My Bed =

1975 Greek film

- Directed by: Giannis Dalianidis
- Written by: Giannis Dalianidis
- Starring: Kostas Voutsas; Eleni Mavromati; Kaiti Improchori; Koula Agaiotou; Yiannis Petropoulos
- Cinematography: Nikos Gardelis
- Edited by: Petros Lykas
- Music by: Mimis Plessas
- Production company: Finos Film
- Release date: 24 March 1975
- Running time: 94 minutes
- Country: Greece
- Language: Greek

A Tank... in My Bed (Greek: Ένα τανκς... στο κρεβάτι μου) is a 1975 Greek comedy film written and directed by Giannis Dalianidis. The film is a political satire and folk comedy set during the dictatorship under the Greek junta of 1967—1974.

== Plot ==
The film is set in early 1967. Kostas is a law-abiding citizen, a quiet man who lives with his mother, his sister, Kaiti, and his younger brother, Giorgos, who is a student.

Kostas works day and night in his convenience store, experiencing the everyday life and turmoil of the time. He is in love with Eleni and wants to marry her, but first Kaiti must get engaged to Leonidas, who is of right-wing beliefs.

Kostas is forced to go along with the flow of the ruling party, after the coup of April 21, he hangs and unhangs, so images: of the king, Papadopoulos etc., on the other hand, Giorgos, his brother, becomes a member of an anti-dictatorship organization that plants bombs. The brother's illegal actions get him into trouble.

In the Polytechnic uprising, Kostas will be injured, but after the return of Democracy, his suffering will come to an end, and he will marry his beloved, Eleni.

== Cast ==
- Kostas Voutsas as Kostas Papadimas
- Eleni Mavromati as Eleni
- Kaiti Improchori as Kaiti Papadimas
- Koula Agaiotou as Dorothea Papadimas
- Yannis Petropoulos as George Papadimas
- Theodoros Dovas as Leonidas
- Tasos Ramsis
- Irene Koumarianou
- Lina Krassa
- George Zaifidis as Colonel Hatzimaneas

== Release ==
The film was screened in theaters in Piraeus, Athens and the suburbs in 1975, selling a total of 85,860 tickets, ranking 3rd out of 47 on the relevant list.
