= Zoe Laskari =

Greek actress (1942–2017)

Zoe Laskari (Greek: Ζωή Λάσκαρη, pronounced [zoˈi ˈlaskari]; 12 December 1942 – 18 August 2017 was a Greek actress and beauty pageant titleholder. After being crowned Star Hellas 1959 and representing Greece at Miss Universe 1959, where she was placed in the top-15, she switched to acting, where she had a brilliant career. She is considered one of the biggest stars of Greek cinema.

== Life ==
Zoe Laskari was born Zoe Kouroukli in Thessaloniki, Greece, on 12 December 1942 into a middle class family which had a long tradition of service to the Hellenic Army. Her father was murdered by the organization ELAS, during the German occupation in late 1943 and her mother was also murdered by ELAS in 1949, in the Greek Civil War.

She was raised by her maternal grandparents. In 1959, she won the title of Star Hellas (Miss Greece). In order to participate in the pageant she added two years to her age, so that she could convince people that she was 17 years old. She went on to represent Greece at the Miss Universe pageant in Long Beach, California where she reached the semi-finals. However, while being in the United States, it was revealed that she was still legally a minor, having obscured her true age. She refused to return to Greece and stayed in New York City for about 18 months.

== Marriages ==
In 1967, she married industrialist Petros Koutoumanos, by whom she had her first daughter, Martha Koutoumanou. Their marriage ended in 1971. In June 1976, she married the criminal lawyer, Alexandros Lykourezos; they had a daughter, Maria-Eleni Lykourezou.

== Career ==
Due to her success at the beauty pageant, director Giannis Dalianidis, offered her the starring role in O katiforos, a 1961 film, whose success gave her a rapid popularity and she shortly signed an exclusive contract with the biggest Greek film production company at the time, Finos Film. The films in which she appeared ranged from dramas to comedies and musicals. Some of her later movies were Stefania (1966) and Oi Thalassies oi Hadres (1967). Other Laskari film hits were Nomos 4000, Merikoi to protimoun kryo, Koritsia gia filima, Dakrya gia tin Ilektra, Mia kyria sta bouzoukia and Marihouana stop.

Her stage work included famous plays like Edward Albee's Who's Afraid of Virginia Woolf?, the ancient Greek tragedy The Trojan Women by Euripides and Neil Simon's Barefoot in the Park. Her theatrical hits include the play Oi erastes tou Oneirou which was also her first play in Athens. Laskari's first television appearance was her leading role in the TV series Romaios kai Ioulieta in 1976.

== Death ==
Laskari died on 18 August 2017 at Porto Rafti, aged 74, from heart failure. She was survived by her two daughters.

== Filmography ==
Year	Title	Role	Notes
1961	O katiforos	Rea Nikolaou	box office: 161,331
1962	Nomos 4000	Maria Oikonomou	box office: 118,841
1962	Horis taftotita	Liana Mavroleontos	
1962	O atsidas	Anna Kourouzou	box office: 69,414
1963	Merikoi to protimoun kryo	Eva Aggelou	box office: 212,247
1963	Iliggos	Elli	
1963	Ena koritsi gia dyo	Myrto	box office: 386,817
1964	Egoismos	Maria	box office: 344,675
1965	Teddy boy agapi mou	Zoe Eftyhidou	
1965	Koritsia gia filima	Tzeni	box office: 619,236
1965	Istoria mias zois	Marigo / Maria / Mairi	
1966	Stefania	Stefania Karali	
1966	Dakrya gia tin Ilektra	Ilektra Petridi	box office: 328,277
1967	Oi Thalassies oi Hadres	Mary Kaniatoglou	box office: 531,278
1968	Olga agapi mou	Olga Panagiotidoi-Vassileiadou	box office: 367,559
1968	Mia kyria sta bouzoukia	Anna Masourou	box office: 615,483
1968	Gymnoi sto dromo	Xenia Koumarianou	
1969	Agapi gia panta	Eleni	
1970	Aftoi pou milisan me ton thanato		
1971	Marijuana Stop!	Kaiti Lagopoulou	box office: 312,260
1972	Aixmalotoi tou misous	Viky Kouvariotou	box office: 124,745
1973	Ston asterismo tis Parthenou	Koula	box office: 120,010
1974	Erastes tou oneirou	Zoe	box office: 70,456
1982	Anametrisi	Anna	
