= Teddy Boy agapi mou =

Teddy Boy My Love
- Greek: Τέντυ μπόι αγάπη μου
- Directed by: Giannis Dalianidis
- Written by: Giannis Dalianidis
- Starring: Zoe Laskari; Kostas Voutsas; Nitsa Marouda
- Distributed by: Finos Films
- Release date: 1965
- Country: Greece
- Language: Greek

Teddy Boy agapi mou (Greek: Greek: Τέντυ μπόι αγάπη μου, Teddy Boy My Love) is a 1965 Greek comedy film directed by Giannis Dalianidis.

== Plot ==
A widower (Kostas Voutsas) with two children falls in love with Zoi Eftychidou (Zoe Laskari) and encounters family opposition, especially from his Teddy Boy son.

== Cast ==
- Zoe Laskari .... Zoi Eftychidou
- Kostas Voutsas .... Aris Matsakoulis
- Nitsa Marouda .... Popi
- Nikitas Platis .... Asimakis Matsakoulis
- Athinodoros Prousalis .... Kyriakos
- Nana Skiada .... Mary Eftyhidou
- Nikos Papanastassiou .... Kostas Panagiotidis
- Kostas Papachristos .... constructor
- Aliki Zografou .... Marika
- Eleni Mavromati .... Rena Panagiotidou
