= Stamatis Filippoulis =

Greek journalist and writer (1930–2014)

Stamatios-Alexandros Filippoulis (Σταμάτης Φιλιππούλης) (1930–2014) was a Greek journalist and writer, known for his television shows, his characteristic wit and dry sense of humour and his films in the Greek cinema and theatre of the 1960s and 1970s.

== Author and Playwright ==
He became well known and popular as a journalist, screenwriter and television presenter with an organic and authentic sense of humor and a distinctive pen. He was a member of the Athens Daily Newspaper Editors Association, a member of the International Federation of Journalists and a member of the Society of Greek Playwrights. He worked for the newspapers Acropolis, Empros, Ethnikos Kiryx, Apogevmatini, and Ethnos. In the magazines "Eikones", "Proto", "Thisavros". His pen name was Alexis Komninos. He has written the biographies of many Greek theatre legends and actors such as: Karolos Koun, Dionysis Papagiannopoulos, Nikos Stavridis, Mimis Fotopoulos, Anna Kalouta, Giorgos Zampetas and others. He had a personal friendship with many of them, such as Aliki Vougiouklaki and Dimitris Papamichael. As a screenwriter and playwright he wrote more than 80 works, many of which became commercial successes: "The Mediterranean Sea is on Fire", "No", "On the Border of Betrayal" (the fourth most commercially successful movie in the history of Greek cinema), "5,000 Lies", "In the battle of Crete", "The Playboy", "Oh Mother Hellas-20 years Theodorakis", "Koutalianos Chews Everything!", "Here Deutsche Welle" etc.
