= Istoria mias zois =

Story of a Life
- Greek: Ιστορία μιας ζωής
- Directed by: Giannis Dalianidis
- Written by: Giannis Dalianidis
- Starring: Zoi Laskari; Manos Katrakis; Tasso Kavadia; Lefteris Vournas; Betty Arvaniti; Golfo Bini; Andreas Douzos; Athinodoros Proussalis; Eirini Koumarianou; Irini Koumarianou
- Distributed by: Finos Films
- Release date: November 14, 1965
- Running time: 94 minutes
- Country: Greece
- Language: Greek

Istoria mias zois (Greek: Ιστορία μιας ζωής, Story of a Life) is a 1965 Greek black-and-white film starring Zoi Laskari and Manos Katrakis. The film sold 534,086 tickets in Athens alone.

== Plot ==
The story follows a poor, orphaned girl (Zoi Laskari) who leaves the village where she lived with her grandmother, when they were kicked out of their house, heads to Athens in order to survive, following a public shaming. In the city, she is initially hired as a maid, later works in a hair salon, and eventually marries a wealthy, upper-class man (Manos Katrakis)—the ex-husband of one of her clients—after his wife passes away. She now leads a life of affluence, but a great, passionate love suddenly enters her life in the form of a young man. Unable to resist what is essentially her first true love, she decides to leave her elderly husband to be with the young man. However, her husband discovers her infidelity and blackmails her, forcing her to stay with him in order to save her lover from financial ruin. She agrees, but shortly thereafter, she commits suicide by driving her car off a cliff. The shock for everyone involved is profound.

== Cast ==
- Zoi Laskari as Marigo/Maria/Mary Papadima
- Manos Katrakis as Mikes Papadimas
- Tasso Kavadia as Eleni Papadima
- Anna Paitatzi as Amalia Papadopoulou
- Vasilis Mavromatis as Petros
- Angelos Mavropoulos as Papadopoulos
- Betty Arvaniti as Leontiadou
- Athinodoros Prousalis as Giorgis

== Festival ==
The film was screened at the Thessaloniki Film Festival (See: 1965 Thessaloniki Film Festival).

== See also ==
- List of Greek films
