= Oi Thalassies oi Hadres =

The Blue Beads
- Greek: Οι Θαλασσιές οι Χάντρες
- Directed by: Giannis Dalianidis
- Written by: Giannis Dalianidis
- Produced by: Filopimin Finos
- Starring: Zoe Laskari; Kostas Voutsas; Martha Karagianni; Faidon Georgitsis; Giannis Vogiatzis; Mary Chronopoulou
- Cinematography: Giorgos Arvanitis
- Edited by: Petros Lykas
- Music by: Mimis Plessas
- Distributed by: Finos Film
- Release date: 2 February 1967
- Running time: 91 minutes
- Country: Greece
- Language: Greek

Oi Thalassies oi Hadres (Greek: Οι Θαλασσιές οι Χάντρες, The Blue Beads) is a 1967 Greek musical film, directed by Giannis Dalianidis and starring Zoe Laskari, Kostas Voutsas, Martha Karagianni, Faidon Georgitsis, Giannis Vogiatzis and Mary Chronopoulou. At the time of its release it was among the most expensive films ever made in Greece and one of the most commercially successful Greek films.

== Plot ==
Mary (Zoe Laskari) is a rich young lady that challenges problems in a traditional folk neighbourhood in Plaka, Athens, when she moves to play modern music in a store opposite a traditional taverna, where Fotis (Faidon Georgitsis), a bouzouki player, works along with Kostas (Kostas Voutsas), Sofia (Mary Chronopoulou) and others. The gang of the taverna soon turns against Mary, for the reason that she alters the character of the neighbourhood. Eventually, Fotis falls in love with Mary, but his friends margin him as he seems willing to sacrifice everything for her in order to be accepted by her social circles. A second love story involves in the film, as Eleni (Martha Karagianni), sister of Fotis, tries to attract Kostas using various ways.

== Production ==
After the success that the 1966 film Diplopenies made abroad, Finos Film's main goal was to make a film addressing to the foreign market and for this reason director Giannis Dalianidis was asked to include more elements of the Greek culture in this musical film, in order to diversify it from the American musical films and make it attractive for the general public. In addition to this, the production company spent a large amount of money to make the film more glamorous, an element that was absent for the great majority of the Greek films of the era.

Several talented and famous actors were engaged in this film, including some of the most brilliant Greek stars who portrayed the major roles, while composer Mimis Plessas and singer Giannis Poulopoulos surrounded the characters of the film producing a great musical result.

== Cast ==
- Zoe Laskari - Mary Kaniatoglou
- Kostas Voutsas - Kostas Pitouras
- Martha Karagianni - Eleni Tsitoura
- Phaedon Georgitsis - Fotis Tsitouras
- Nana Skiada - Mrs. Kaniatoglou
- Aris Maliagros - Sokratis Kaniatoglou
- Giorgos Tsitsopoulos - Jim
- Aleka Mavili - Markisia
- Nikos Fermas - Apostolis
- Giannis Vogiatzis - Memas Ventouzas
- Mary Chronopoulou - Sofia
- Nikos Papanastasiou - Nikos
- Christos Doxaras - Sotos
- Mary Metaxa - Mrs. Pitoura
- Golfo Bini - Mrs. Tsitoura
- Alekos Kouris - Alekos

In this movie, Faidon Georgitsis and Mary Chronopoulou made their first appearance ever in a musical film. Almost identically the main cast of the film, Zoe Laskari, Kostas Voutsas, Martha Karagianni, Faidon Georgitsis, Giannis Vogiatzis and Mary Chronopoulou starred in the 1968 hit of Finos Film and Giannis Dalianidis, Mia Kyria sta Bouzoukia.

== Major themes ==
The main subject of the film is the influx of foreign cultural elements in the Greek society in the 1960s, like the music genres of pop and rock. In the film this influx shocks the traditional neighbourhood of Plaka in Athens, infuriates and alarms the people who occupy with the laïkó music style. It also demonstrates the liberation of women, as part of the feministic ideology that arrives in Greece, as the main female character of the movie is a young woman from the upper class, who forms her own cohort along with her female friends and brings new mores in an old-fashioned local society.

== Release ==
The film released in Greek cinemas on February 20, 1967, and made 531,278 tickets in Greece, ranked 3rd for the season 1966–67. The film was also screened in the Cannes Film Festival and was received with enthusiasm by the audience, although it did not officially contest. Especially, Zoe Laskari was seen as an international celebrity and paparazzi followed her everywhere during her stay in Cannes.
