= Kostas Hatzichristos =

Greek actor (1921–2001)

Kostas Hatzichristos Κώστας Χατζηχρήστος
- Born: 25 December 1921; Thessaloniki, Greece
- Died: 3 October 2001 (aged 79); Marousi, Greece
- Education: Sergeants Major Military School of Syros
- Occupations: Actor; director; writer; film producer; theatrical producer
- Years active: 1943–2001
- Spouse: Nitsa (unknown surname) (divorced) Mary Nikolaidou (divorced) Kaiti Ntirintaoua (divorced) Eleni Pantazi (died); Voula Arvanitaki-Hatzichristou
- Children: Teta Hatzichristou; Marialena Hatzichristou

Kostas Hatzichristos or Costas Hajihristos (Greek: Κώστας Χατζηχρήστος; 25 December 1921 – 3 October 2001) was a Greek actor.

== Biography ==
He was born on 25 December 1921 in Thessaloniki, Greece, to a large family of thirteen members, he was the eleventh child of the family. His parents were from Constantinople (today Istanbul), and they were initially relocated to Kavala, moved to Thessaloniki thereafter, and later moved to the northern Athens suburb of Pagkrati.

The young Kostas studied initially at the Sergeants Major Military School of Syros and finished his studies in the Kavala. He worked in the variety theatre Missouri in Piraeus and with the Nitsa Gaitanaki company where he played in The Grouch (Το Στραβόξυλο) by Dimitris Psathas. From 1945 until 1948, he worked in an operetta company owned by Paraskevas Oikonomou and appeared in the Pefka variety with Oikonomidis and Oasia with Mimis Traiforos. In 1949‒50, he participated in Koula Nikolaidou's musical company at the Verdun theatre (Θέατρο Βερντέν) at Alexandras Avenue.

At the Verdun theatre, Hatzichristos acted for his first time in his successful run in the role of a villager character called Thymios, a role inspired by Kostas Nikolaidis, brother of his wife Mary Nikolaidou. Hatzichristos first screen appearance was in the movie The Knights' Castle in 1952 with Giorgos Asimakopoulos and Nikos Tsiforos. At the same time, he was successful at the theatre founded in 1952 by his own theatrical troupe. In 1960, he became a theatrical entrepreneur and founded his own theatre: Hatzichristos Theatre (Θέατρο Χατζηχρήστου). The theatre premiered on 18 February 1960, and was later renamed as the Treatre Orfeas. It was located at Panepistimiou Avenue in the Athens neighborhood of Akadimia. Among the greatest successes in his career were the films What a Mess (Της Κακομοίρας) in 1963 and Τhe Man Who Returned from the Plates (Ο Άνθρωπος που Γύρισε από τα Πιάτα!) in 1969 with Anna Fonsou and Dionysis Papagiannopoulos. He also produced three films and directed eight.

His theatrical work continued until 1983. After a long period of absence, he returned into the theatre in 1994‒95 era and played in the local Hatzichristos Theatre. His difficult years begun when his third wife, Eleni Pantazi died at the age of 42.

Kostas Hatzichristos died from a respiratory infection, at Athens Medical Center, on 3 October 2001, at age 79. He was interred at public expense at First Cemetery of Athens on 5 October 2001.

== Personal life ==
He was engaged with the actress Ntina Trianti with whom they had starred in several movies together. His first marriage was done during the Axis occupation of Greece with a woman named Nitsa who was from Naousa, Imathia. They were living together for many years. In 1949 he married Mary Nikolaidou with whom he had one daughter, Teta Hatzichristou who was married actor Petros Fyssoun with whom he had one daughter, actress Ania Fyssoum. In 1955 he married actress Ketty Diridaoua and divorced in 1975, with whom he had one daughter Marialena Hatzichristou. His third wife was Eleni Pantazi. His last wife was Voula Arvanitaki-Hatzichristou.

== Filmography ==
Feature Films
Year	Original Title	Adapted Title	Role
1952	Ο Πύργος των Ιπποτών	The Knights' Castle	
1954	Οι Τρεις Δραπέτες του Τρελοκομείου	Three Escapees From Asylum	Giorgos
1954	Νύχτες της Αθήνας	Nights in Athens	Kostakis
1955	Πιάσαμε την Καλή	We Finally Hit It	Thymios Touloumotyris
1955	Ο Αγαπητικός της Βοσκοπούλας	The Lover of the Shepherdess	Gerlas
1955	Γκόλφω	Golfo-Girl of the Mountains	Dimos
1955	Τα Τρία Μωρά	The Three Babies	Philip Mandaropoulos
1955	Κάλλιο Αργά Παρά Ποτέ	Better Late than Never	
1956	Τα Κωθώνια του Συντάγματος	Regimental Dummies	Thymios the Roumeliotis
1956	Ποιος θα Πληρώσει το Μάρμαρο;	Who Will Pay for the Marble?	Thymios
1956	Οι Τρακαδόροι της Αθήνας	The Spongers of Athens	Agamemnon
1956	Κυνηγώντας τον Έρωτα	Hunting for Love	Thymios
1956	Δολάρια και Όνειρα	Dollars and Dreams	
1957	Τζιπ, Περίπτερο Κι' Αγάπη	Jeep Kiosk and Love	Yiorgaras
1957	Μαρία η Πενταγιώτισσα	Maria Pentayiotissa	Thymios
1957	Τσαρούχι, Πιστόλι, Παπιγιόν	The Wooden Shoe, the Pistol and the Bowtie	Alexandros Kortakias, Takis, Thymios, Marked man
1957	Τρία Παιδιά Βολιώτικα	Three Guys from Volos	Policeman Dimos
1957	Έχει Θείο το Κορίτσι	The Girl Has an Uncle	Polyzois
1957	Μανούλα Θέλω να Ζήσεις	Mamma, I Want You Alive!	
1957	3 Τρελοί Ντετέκτιβς	Three Crazy Detectives	Vagelis
1958	Ο Κόμης... Χατζηχρήστος	Count Hatzichristos	
1958	Γερακίνα	The Falcon	
1959	Ο Ηλίας του 16ου	The Policeman of the 16th Precinct	Ilias
1959	Λαός και Κολωνάκι	Poor People and Rich People	Kostas
1959	Σαρακατσάνισσα	Sarakatsanissa	
1959	Ο Θύμιος τα ‘κανε Θάλασσα	Thymios Screwed Things Up	Thymios Boukouras
1959	Να Ζήσουν τα Φτωχόπαιδα	Long Live the Poor Kids	Tonis Paxoulos
1959	Η Λίζα το ‘σκασε	Lisa, Tosca of Athens	Iordanis Kollaros
1959	Έρωτας... Με Δόσεις	Love with Installments	Fontas
1959	Δράκουλας και Σία	Dracula and Co.	Thanasis Karatribouras
1959	Διακοπές στην Κολοπετινίτσα	Vacation in Kolopetinitsa	Efthymios Tamzourlas
1959	Κρυστάλλω	Krystallo	
1960	Μακρυκωσταίοι και Κοντογιώργηδες	Makrikostae and Kodogeorgides	Thomas Makrykostas
1960	Αντίο Ζωή	Goodbye Life	Police officer at the theatre
1960	Τα Ντερβισόπεδα	The Dervish Boys	Thodoros
1960	Ο Θύμιος Τάχει 400	Thymios is Fully Aware	Thymios Taboulas, Kostas Hatzis
1961	Ο Σκληρός Άντρας	The Tough Guy	Iraklis Leontopoulos
1961	Το Παιδί της Πιάτσας	The Boy of the Market	Mimis Fakis
1961	Το Έξυπνο Πουλί	The Clever Bird	Loukas Manis
1961	Καπετάνιος για Κλάματα	A Hopeless Captain	Simos Papafigos
1962	Ο Δήμος απ’ τα Τρίκαλα	Demos from Trikala	Paraskevas Pournaras
1962	Ο Ταξιτζής	The Taxi Driver	Thanasis Perimenis
1962	Πεζοδρόμιο	Sidewalk	
1962	Ο Μηχαλιός του 14ου Συντάγματος	Michalios of the 14th Regiment	Mihalios Karamihalis
1962	Η Αθήνα τη Νύχτα	Athens by Night	Policeman
1963	Της Κακομοίρας	What a Mess	Zikos
1963	Ο Ταυρομάχος Προχωρεί!	The Torreador Advances	Michalis
1963	Ο κος Πτέραρχος	Mister Wing-Commander	Kanellos
1963	Ο Καζανόβας	Casanova	Giorgos Hatzigeorgalas
1963	Ο Θύμιος στη Χώρα του Στριπτήζ	Thymios in the Land of Striptease	Thymios
1963	Ο Ανηψιός μου ο Μανώλης	My Nephew, Manolis	Manolis Maramenos
1964	Οι Κληρονόμοι	The Heirs	Panagiotis Tsokos
1964	Η Σωφερίνα	The Chauffeur Girl	Policeman
1964	Ο Παράς και ο Φουκαράς	The Dough and Pauper	Kosmas Peristeris
1964	Ο Θαλασσόλυκος!..	The Sea-Wolf	Pantelis Kazouras
1964	Ένας Ζόρικος Δεκανέας	The Tough Corporal	Corp. Thanasis Prasinadas
1965	Όχι Κύριε Τζόνσον	No, Mister Johnson	Buyer
1965	Πράκτορες 005 Εναντίον Χρυσοπόδαρου	Agents 005 vs Goldfoot	Kosmas Bouralas
1966	Φως... Νερό... Τηλέφωνο, Οικόπεδα με Δόσεις	Power, Phone, Water and Plots on Installments	Manolis Pelekoudis
1966	Ο Τετραπέρατος	Sharp As a Razor	Dimos Pournaris
1966	Ο Μελέτης στην Άμεσο Δράση	Meletis of the Flying Squad	Meletis
1966	Ένα Καράβι Παπαδόπουλοι	A Ship Full of Papadopoulos	Thymios
1967	Σήκω Χόρεψε Συρτάκι	Get Up and Dance the Syrtaki	Thymios
1968	Ο Τυχεράκιας	The Lucky One	Thymios
1968	Η Αθήνα Μετά Τα Μεσάνυχτα	Athens After Midnight	Thymios Vlacholeventis
1969	Ο Άνθρωπος που Γύρισε από τα Πιάτα!	Τhe Man Who Returned from the Plates	Laki Petris
1969	Κακός, Ψυχρός και Ανάποδος	Bad, Cold and Cantankerous	Thymios, Kostas Papachatzis
1970	Τι Κάνει ο Άνθρωπος για να Ζήσει	What a Man Has to Do to Survive	Leandros Perperis
1970	Ο Απίθανος	The Unbelievable	Makis Harisis
1970	Ένας Χίππυς με Τσαρούχια	A Hippy in Sandals	Grocer (Pharmacist)
1970	Ένα Μπουζούκι Αλλοιώτικο από τ’ Άλλα	A Bouzouki Different from the Others	Kostas Karavedouras
1971	Θύμιος Εναντίον Τσίτσιου	Thymios vs. Tsitsos	Thymios, Tsitsios
1972	Η Αλίκη Δικτάτωρ	Dictator Aliki	Director of Newspaper
1979	Γυναικες στα Όπλα	Women at Arms	Stamos Zoupas
1981	Άγριες Κότες	Wild Chickens	Thymios Touloumotyris
2001	Αλέξανδρος και Αϊσέ	Alexander and Aishe	

Videos, TV Series, TV Videos From Theatrical Plays
Year	Original Title	Adapted Title	Category
1974	Το Παλιό το Κατοστάρι	The Old Katostari	TV series on YENED
1975	Χρονικό του Μουσικού Θεάτρου: Λιγο Από Όλα	Music Theatre Chronicles: Little of Anything	TV Video on EIRT
1977	Ο Ταξιτζής	The Taxi Driver	TV series on YENED
1979	Ο Ταξιτζής: Ένας Ταξιτζής από τ' Αλώνια	The Taxi Driver from the Alonia	TV series on YENED
1984	Βραδυά Επιθεώρησης	Revue Night	TV series on ERT
1986	Ο Γιος του Πάρτα Όλα	The Son of One-Takes-All	Video
1987	Ένας Πιλότος για Πέταμα	A Pilot To Be Thrown Away	Video
1988	Και το Πρώτο Κλαρίνο	And the First Clarinet	Video
1988	Ένας Μπάτσος με Τσαρούχια	A Policeman With Charouchia	Video
1991	Οι Δέκα Μικροί Μήτσοι	Ten Little Mitsoi	TV series on Mega
1994	Βλαμμένα Άχρηστα Μυαλά	Vlamena Ahrista Myala	TV Video on ANT1
1995	Δεν Ήξερες Δεν Ρώταγες;	Didn't you Know? Didn't you Ask?	TV Video on Mega
1997	Σημίστε Μας και Αφήστε Μας	Simiste mas... kai Afiste mas	TV Video on Channel 5
1998	Σκάι Νύφη... Σκάι Γαμπρός	Skai Nyfi... Skai Gabros	TV Video on Skai TV
1999	Αθάνατοι Ξεβράκωτοι και Ωραίοι	Athanatoi... Χevrakotoi ki Οraioi	TV Video on ANT1

== Selected theatrical plays ==
Year	Saison	Theatre Play	Adapted Title	Theatre
1945	1944‒1945	Η Φλόγα	The Flame	Kymata (in Volos)
1953	1952‒1953	30 το Δολάριο	30 the One Dollar	Acropole
1953	1953‒1954	Κοντή Φούστα	Mini Skirt	Papaioannou
1953	1953‒1954	Χρυσά Κουτάλια	Golden Spoons	Papaioannou
1954	1953‒1954	Όμορφα κι Ωραία	Beautiful and Nice	Peroke
1954	1953‒1954	Όσα Παίρνει ο Άνεμος	Gone with the Wind	Peroke
1954	1954‒1955	Το Τραγούδι της Αθήνας	The Song of Athens	Cybele
1955	1955	Ομόνοια Πλας	Omonoia Plage	Cybele
1957	1957	Να Ζήσουν τα Φτωχόπαιδα	Long Live the Poor	Peroke
1958	1958‒1959	Σαμπάνια και Ρετσίνα	Champagne and Retsina	Metropolitan
1962	1962‒1963	Κάτω οι Γυναίκες	Down the Women	Hatzichristos
1969	1969‒1970	Βίβα Απάτα	Viva Cheating On	Hatzichristos
1973	1973‒1974	Καίσαρ και Ναπολέων	Caesar and Napoleon	1973, Avlaia, Thessaloniki. 1973‒1974, Hatzichristos.
1983	1982‒1983	Στου ΠΑΣΟΚ την πόρτα... όσο θέλεις βρόντα!	At PASOK’s door, Knock As Much As You Want	Hatzokou
1993	1993	Βλαμμένα Άχρηστα Μυαλά	Vlamena Ahrista Myala	Minoa
1995	1994‒1995	Δεν ήξερες!... Δε ρώταγες;...	Didn't you Know? Didn't you Ask?	Hatzichristos
1997	1996‒1997	Σημίστε Μας και Αφήστε Μας	Simiste mas... kai Afiste mas	Hatzichristos
1997	1997‒1998	Αθάνατοι Ξεβράκωτοι και Ωραίοι	Athanatoi... Χevrakotoi ki Οraioi	Hatzichristos
1997	1997	Σκάι Νύφη... Σκάι Γαμπρός	Skai Nyfi... Skai Gabros	Metropolitan
