= Rena Vlahopoulou =

Greek actress and singer (1923–2004)

- Ρένα Βλαχοπούλου
- Born: Irene Vlahopoulou; 28 July 1923; Corfu, Greece
- Died: 29 July 2004 (aged 81); Marousi, Greece
- Resting place: 1st Cemetery of Corfu
- Citizenship: Greece
- Occupations: Actress; singer; dancer
- Years active: 1938–1997
- Employer: Finos Film
- Spouses: Kostas Vasiliou (m. 1939; div. 1943) Giannis Kostopoulos (m. 1943; div. 1946) Giorgos Lafazanis (m. 1967)
- Awards: Order of the Phoenix (2003)

Irene Vlahopoulou (Greek: Ειρήνη Βλαχοπούλου; 28 July 1923 – 29 July 2004) was a Greek actress and singer. She starred in theatre, musical and Greek cinema productions, including The Gambler and The Countess of Corfu.

== Biography ==
Vlahopoulou was born on 28 July 1923 on the island of Corfu, the fifth of nine children. She first began playing the piano, taught by her father, Giannis Vlahopoulos. When she turned ten, she began singing at a local bakery; she was a talented dancer and actress and a qualified mezzo-soprano. Over the course of her fifty-five-year career she appeared in 105 theatrical plays between 1939 and 1994, and twenty-six films between 1951 and 1985.

In 1939, Vlahopoulou and AEK Athens footballer, Kostas Vasiliou eloped to Athens and were married. She began singing at the Oasis varieté show in the Zappeion gardens, where Mimis Traiforos presented his new work. In the winter of 1939–40, she sang at the World Theatre of Kostas Makedos on Panepistimiou Street.

The marriage with Vasiliou ended. In 1943 she married her second husband, a banker, Giannis Kostopoulos; the couple divorced in 1946. She married her third and final husband, entrepreneur Giorgos Lafazanis, on 18 September 1967. They remained wed until her death in 2004. Vlahopoulou had no children by any of her marriages. She left Finos Film in 1966 and moved to Karagiannis-Karatzopoulos. From 1972, she continued to star in films for the next seven years. In 1992–93, she starred in the musical comedy Gia Tin Ellada Re Gamo To (Για την Ελλάδα ρε γαμώ το), after which she retired.

She was taken for surgery to the intensive care unit of Athens Medical Center, with a gastrointestinal perforation caused by diabetes, on 16 July 2004. She had fallen into a coma the following days, and died of sudden cardiac arrest on 29 July 2004, just a day after her 81st birthday.

Her body was placed in a public pilgrimage at the Church of Saint Lazarus, in the First Cemetery of Athens, on 30 July 2004. She was buried at public expense on 31 July 2004, accompanied by the band of the Philharmonic Society "Mantzaros" that came from Corfu, and in the presence of many of her colleagues and ordinary people. On the day of her funeral all shops in Corfu remained closed as a sign of mourning. Her hometown honored her by naming the old "Mon Repos" Theatre the "Rena Vlachopoulou" Mon Repos Modern Theatre.

== Filmography ==
- 1951: Anatolitikes nyhtes
- 1956: The Girl from Corfu
- 1962: Otan leipei i gata
- 1962: Merikoi to protimoun kryo
- 1963: Ena koritsi gia dyo
- 1963: Kati na kaiei
- 1964: I hartopaihtra
- 1964: Koritsia gia filima
- 1965: Fonazi o kleftis
- 1966: Randevou ston aera
- 1966: I vouleftina
- 1967: Viva Rena
- 1970: Mia treli sarantara
- 1968: I ziliara
- 1969: I Pariziana
- 1970: I theia mou i hipissa
- 1970: Mia Ellinida sto haremi
- 1971: Ziteitai epeigontos gambros
- 1972: I komissa tis Kerkyras
- 1972: I Rena einai offside (Η Ρένα είναι οφσάιντ; Rena Is Offside)
- 1979: Oi fantarines (Φανταρίνες; Women soldiers)
- 1980: Rena na i efkairia (Ρένα να η ευκαιρία; Rena, this is your chance)
