= Giorgos Konstantinou =

Greek actor and director (born 1934)

- Γιώργος Κωνσταντίνου
- Born: Georgios Konstantinou; 27 October 1934 (age 91); Agios Pavlos, Athens, Greece
- Citizenship: Greece
- Occupations: Actor; director; screenwriter
- Years active: 1958–present
- Employers: Finos Film; National Theatre of Greece
- Spouses: Maria Marmarinou (divorced); Maria Douri
- Children: 2
- Mother: Nitsa Filosofou

Georgios Konstantinou (Greek: Γεώργιος Κωνσταντίνου; born 27 October 1934) is a Greek actor, director, and screenwriter. He was born on 27 October 1934 in the Agios Pavlos neighbourhood of Athens, the son of actress Nitsa Filosofou. His career was boosted after the 'profiterole' scene in the movie Ktipokardia sto thranio and reached its pinnacle with the comedy film The... Kopanoi in the 1980s. He has written and acted in several plays and TV series.

== Filmography ==
=== Movies ===
Year	Film	Transliteration and translation	Role
1961	Liza and Others	Η Λίζα και η άλλη I Liza kai i alli	John Pezikis
1962	Merikoi to protimoun kryo	Μερικοί το προτιμούν κρύο Many Choose Cold	Tryfonas
1962	I ynekes theloun xilo	Οι γυναίκες θέλουν ξύλο These Women Deserves a Spanking	Troulis
1962	The Man of my Wife	Ο άντρας της γυναίκας μου O andras tis gynaikas mou	-
1963	Chtypokardia sto thranio	Χτυποκάρδια στο θρανίο	Ioannis Lavdas
1963	Treloi polyteleias	Τρελοί πολυτελείας	Minas
1963	My Friend Lefterakis	Ο φίλος μου ο Λευτεράκης; O filos mou Lefterakis	Thanassis Kadris
1963	O kathos prepi	Ο καθώς πρέπει	Stamatis Velenopoulos
1963	Avto to kati allo	Αυτό το κάτι άλλο	Stelios Kaponis
1964	O eaftoulis mou	Ο εαυτούλης μου	-
1964	Nychtoperpatimata	Νυχτοπερπατήματα	-
1964	I Soferina	Η σωφερίνα	Mihalis Haridimos
1964	My Greek Wedding	Γάμος αλά ελληνικά	Petros Veros also as a writer himself
1965	And the Wife Shall Revere Her Husband	δε γυνή να φοβήται τον άνδρα	Antonakis Kokovikos
1966	5,000 Lies	5000 ψέματα 5.000 psemmata	Kostas Tsiftalezis also a writer himself
1966	A Man for All the Chores	Άνθρωπος για όλες τις δουλειές Anthropos yia oles tis doulies	Giorgos Gasparatos
1968	I Ziliara	Η ζηλιάρα	Argiris Pandelias
1969	Wake Up Vassilis	Ξύπνα Βασίλη; Xypna Vasili	Vassilis Vassilakis
1972	Boom taratazoum	Μπουμ ταραταζούμ	Vlakometros / Ippias
1973	The Women's Rule	Η γυναικοκρατία I yinekokratia	Lysandros
1980	Kathenas me ti trela tou	Καθένας με την τρέλα του	Giorgis
1980	A Taste of Greece	Γεύση από Ελλάδα; Yefsi apo Ellada	lover
1986	Kafta thrania	Καυτά θρανία	-
1988	The Kopanoi	The κόπανοι	'Leonidas the Tall' as actor, also director and a writer
1988	O pontikokynigos ton dyo ipeiron	Ο ποντικοκυνηγός των δύο ηπείρων	Mike Hamster
1989	Ke kathigita, pou... koimithikate hthes?	Κύριε καθηγητά πού κοιμηθήκατε χτες	Ponai von Vgalton
2012	What If...	Άν...	Antonakis Kokovikos

=== Television ===
- Anthropines istories 1975 (TV)
- Ase ton kosmo na gelasei 1975 (TV) (Also Directed)
- Treis kai o koukos 1985 (TV) (Also Directed)
- Mi mou girnas tin plati 1986 (TV) (Also Directed)
- I Alepou kai o boufos 1987 (TV) (Also Directed)
- Patir, yios kai pnevma 1990 (TV) (Also Directed)
- Aggelos kata lathos 1990 (TV)
- Ta Efta kaka tis moiras mou 1991 (TV) (Also Directed)
- Zoe patini 1995 (TV) (Also Directed)
- Alli to proi alli to vradi 1995 (TV) (Also Directed)
- Diplani porta 1997 (TV) (Also Directed)
- To Berdema 2000 (TV) (Also Directed)
- Ta Filarakia 2002 (TV) (Also Directed)
- Odos Paradeisou 7 2006 (TV)
- Ta Kalytera mas Chronia 2021 (TV)( Guest Star)
- Oi Pantheoi 2023 (TV) ( Guest Star)
