= Gymnoi sto dromo =

Naked in the street
- Greek: Γυμνοί στο δρόμο
- Directed by: Giannis Dalianidis
- Written by: Giannis Dalianidis
- Starring: Zoi Laskari; Nikos Kourkoulis; Vangelis Seilinos; Andreas Barkoulis; Hrinos Exarhakos
- Distributed by: Finos Film
- Release date: March 24, 1969
- Running time: 85 minutes
- Country: Greece
- Language: Greek

Gymnoi sto dromo or Gimni sto dromo (Greek: Γυμνοί στο δρόμο, Naked in the street) is a 1969 Greek drama film directed and written by Giannis Dalianidis and starring Zoi Laskari, Nikos Kourkoulos, Vangelis Silinos, Andreas Barkoulis and Chronis Exarchakos. The story is about a wealthy lady (Zoi Laskari) which she falls in love with a poor worker (Nikos Kourkoulos) and took part in reactions of the circle in which himself had a fiancée with a girl from his block.

== Cast ==
- Zoi Laskari ..... Xenia Koumarianou
- Nikos Kourkoulos ..... Andreas
- Vangelis Seilinos ..... Christos
- Andreas Barkoulis ..... Xenia's friend
- Sofia Roubou ..... Anna
- Efi Arvanti
- Kia Bozou ..... neighbour
- Toula Diakopoulou
- Chronis Exarchakos
- Maria Foka ..... Anna's mother
- Popi Giamarelou
- Dimitra Papachristou ..... neighbour
- Nikos Papanastassiou ..... Mitsos's brother
- Vangelis Pavlou
- Anni Stavraki
- Kostas Tsianos
