= Marijuana Stop! =

- DVD cover
- Greek: Μαριχουάνα Στοπ
- Directed by: Giannis Dalianidis
- Written by: Giannis Dalianidis
- Produced by: Finos Film
- Starring: Martha Karagianni
- Music by: Mimis Plessas
- Production company: Finos Film
- Release date: 1 March 1971
- Running time: 89 minutes
- Country: Greece
- Language: Greek

Marijuana Stop! (Greek: Μαριχουάνα Stop) is a 1971 film starring Zoe Laskari and Martha Karagianni. The film deals with the hippie culture and its perception in Greek society as drug-using.

== Plot ==
Hippocrates (Chronis Exarchakos) lives in an old mansion in Plaka, renting the basement of the house to Despina (Martha Karagianni), who is in love with him. His cousin, Achilles (Vangelis Seilinos), and his girlfriend, Polina (Maria Ioannidou), want to turn the house into a nightclub, while Hippocrates wants to sell it. Not knowing what to decide, they wait for their other cousin, Kaiti (Zoe Laskari), to return from London where she lives, so that the fate of the house can be decided. Kaiti arrives with the young man Giorgos (Giorgos Pantzas), whom she met on the plane. The next day, she goes to his office and discovers his affair with the Frenchwoman Georgette (Eleni Anousaki). She decides to ignore him, but George besieges her and decides to make her jealous. So, she meets with Melita (Miranda Zafeiropoulou), a rich lady who is in love with the singer Tolis Voskopoulos, whom she also wants to make jealous. Meanwhile, Despina is simultaneously plotting the same trick, to make Hippocrates jealous.

== Cast ==
- Martha Karagianni as Despoina
- Zoe Laskari as Kaiti Lagopoulou
- Giorgos Pantzas as Giorgos Kehagias
- Tolis Voskopoulos as himself
- Chronis Exarhakos as Ippocratis
- Kostas Kafasis as Spyros
- Miranda Zafeiropoulou as Melita Kamvisi
- Eleni Anousaki as Georgette
- Dimitra Seremeti-Papachristou as Zozo
- Nikol Kokkinou as Maria

== Production ==
The film is an adaptation of the eponymous stage musical, with which Zoe Laskari made her debut at the Bournelli Theatre.

== Release ==
The film was first shown in cinemas on 1 March 1971. Selling 312,260 tickets, it ranked 12th out of 87 films of the same season. It was also released on DVD on 11 April 2006.
