= Erastes tou oneirou =

1974 Greek comedy film directed and written by Giannis Dalianidis

The Dream Lovers
- Greek: Εραστές του ονείρου
- Directed by: Giannis Dalianidis
- Written by: Giannis Dalianidis
- Starring: Zoe Laskari; Dimitris Papamichael; Titika Stasinopoulou; Lefteris Vournas; Nikos Dadinopoulos; Lydia Lenossi; Ilya Livykou; Kaiti Ibrochori
- Release date: December 30, 1974
- Running time: 95 minutes
- Country: Greece
- Language: Greek

Erastes tou oneirou (Greek: Εραστές του ονείρου) is a 1974 Greek comedy film directed and written by Giannis Dalianidis. Dimitris (Dimitris Papamihail) carried away from his brother and went to robbed a villa in which Zoi (Zoi Laskari) lives and that made their recognition of their romance. The movie made 70,456 tickets.

== Cast ==
- Zoe Laskari - Zoitsa Kyriazi
- Dimitris Papamichael - Dimitris Karathanasis
- Titika Stasinopoulou - Katina
- Lefteris Vournas - Lefteris Kyriazis
- Nikos Dadinopoulos - Christos Sotiriou
- Lydia Lenosi
- Ilya Livykou - Georgette Kyriazi
- Kaiti Ibrochori - Ermina

== See also ==
- List of Greek films
