= Madalena (1960 film) =

1960 film

- Directed by: Dinos Dimopoulos
- Written by: Giorgos Roussos
- Produced by: Theophanis A. Damaskinos; Victor G. Michaelides
- Starring: Aliki Vougiouklaki
- Cinematography: Walter Lassally
- Edited by: Yanna Spyropoulou; Giorgos Tsaoulis
- Release date: September 1960
- Running time: 91 minutes
- Country: Greece
- Language: Greek

Madalena (Greek: Μανταλένα) is a 1960 Greek comedy film directed by Dinos Dimopoulos. It was entered into the 1961 Cannes Film Festival. The film won three awards in the 1st Thessaloniki Film Festival.

== Plot ==
A girl lives on a small Greek island in the Aegean sea. She and her family live off the job of her father who has a little boat that ferries passengers to a neighboring island. When her father dies, she has to become the head of her family and take care of her brothers and sisters. As a working woman, she faces discrimination from the island's community. Despite many difficulties she doesn't give up. Frustrated, she decides to marry a rich farmer from the island. But the love of her main competitor overturns the situation.

== Cast ==
- Aliki Vougiouklaki as Madalena Charidimou
- Dimitris Papamichael as Labis Yokaris
- Pantelis Zervos as the priest
- Thodoros Moridis (as Theodoros Moridis) as Giorgaras Yokaris
- Yorgos Damasiotis as police captain
- Despo Diamantidou as Mrs. Yoraki
- Smaro Stefanidou as Pipitsa
- Keti Lampropoulou as Rozina Yoraki
- Lavrentis Dianellos as Kapetan Kosmas Charidimos
- Thanasis Vengos as the policeman
- Spyros Kalogyrou as Giakoumis
- Periklis Christoforidis as Charisis
- Maria Giannakopoulou
- Thanasis Tzeneralis (as Thanos Tzeneralis) as Baroutis
- Mary Metaxa
- Panos Karavousanos (as Panagiotis Karavousanos) as an islander
- Nikos Flokas
- Elena Apergi
- Vasilis Kailas as Pantelakis Charidimos (as Vasilakis Kailas)

== Awards ==
List of awards and nominations
Award	Category	Recipients and nominees	Result
1st Thessaloniki Film Festival	Best Screenplay	Giorgos Roussos	Won
1st Thessaloniki Film Festival	Best Leading Actress	Aliki Vougiouklaki	Won
1st Thessaloniki Film Festival	Best Supporting Actor	Pantelis Zervos	Won
