= Pantelis Zervos =

Greek actor

Pantelis Zervos Παντελής Ζερβός
- Born: 1908; Loutraki, Greece
- Died: January 22, 1982 (aged 73–74); Athens, Greece
- Occupation: actor
- Awards: Second Male Role at the Thessaloniki Film Festival in 1960 for Madalena

Pantelis Zervos (Greek: Παντελής Ζερβός, born 1908 in Loutraki – January 22, 1982, in Athens) was a Greek theatrical and a film actor.

== Biography ==
Zervos was born in Loutraki near Corinth in Perachora. He attended the Art Theatre School with Karolos Koun (Coon). He entered the theatrical scene from 1933 and participated with the greatest stars of the time as distinction in classic and main roles, even in modern Greek civics.

His most theatrical plays he acted was Alkistis (Alcestis), Antigoni (Antigone), Macbeth, Plutus, etc.

His presentation at the film saw him a great success. Around 70 were his presentation in movies mostly on the work Madalena produced by Dinos Dimopoulos (1960), he awarded the first award on his second male role at the Thessaloniki Film Festival in 1960. His other appearances include Raw Bread (1915), O agapitikos tis voskopoulas (1955), Makrykostaioi kai Kontogiorgides (1960), Ziteitai pseftis (1961), O Atsidas (1962), Lola (1964), A Student with Blonde Hair (1969) and Maria tis siopis (1973).

Other than his radio and television appearances, Zervos left history, different in everyday radio broadcasts To 5lepto enos thyrorou.

Pantelis Zervos was a member of the Greek Actos Guild and the Artists Council of the National Theatre. He participated in many theatrical periodicals in and out of Greece in which he took part distinctively. For his theatricals he was awarded the Order of the Golden Cross by George I and King Paul.

He lived along in Palaio Faliro in Athens and spoke English. He died on January 22, 1982 at the age of 73. He is buried in Palaio Faliro. He raised two daughters.

== Filmography ==
Year	Film	Transliteration and translation	Role
1943	The Voice of the Heart | Η φωνή της καρδιάς I foni tis kardias]]	-	
1955	Joe the Menace	Τζο ο τρομερός Tzo o tromeros	-
1955	O agapitikos tis voskopoulas	Ο αγαπητικός της βοσκοπούλας	-
1957	The Aunt from Chicago	Η θεία απ΄ το Σικάγο; I theia ap' to Chicago	Xenofon
1957	To amaxaki	Το αμαξάκι	-
1958	I kyra mas i mami	Η κυρά μας η μαμή	Cousin Tanabassis
1960	The Papadopoulos Family	Οικογένεια Παπαδοπούλου; Ikoyenia Papadopoulou	Dimitris Papadopoulos
1960	Madalena	Μανταλένα	=
1960	Those Yellow Gloves	Τα κίτρινα γάντια<r>Ta kitrina gantia	cafe owner
1961	Ziteitai pseftis	Ζητείται ψεύτης	Theofilos Ferekis
1961	I Liza kai i alli	Η Λίζα και η άλλη Liza and Others	a judge
1961	The Downhill	Ο κατήφορος O Katiforos	the father of Reas
1962	Athens by Night	Η Αθήνα τη νύχτα I Athina ti nychta	himself
1962	O atsidas	Ο ατσίδας	Thodoros Kourouzos
1964	Lola	Λόλα	the father of Lola
1964	Eimai mia dystychiomeni	Είμαι μια δυστυχισμένη	Hatzis
1965	O megalos orkos	Ο μεγάλος όρκος	Kostas
1966	Dokimassia	Δοκιμασία	Petros
1967	O methystakas tou limaniou	Ο μεθύστακας του λιμανιού	Captain Michalis
1968	Xerizomeni genia	Ξεριζωμένη γενιά	Mitsos
1969	To leventopaido	Το λεβεντόπαιδο	-
1969	The teacher with the blonde hair	Η δασκάλα με τα ξανθά μαλλιά	a president
1971	The daughter of the sun	Η κόρη του ήλιου I kori tou iliou	-
1973	I Maria tis siopis		Lambros
1974	The truth is bitter	I alitheia einai pikri	-
