= My Friend Lefterakis =

O filos mou o Lefterakis Ο φίλος μου ο Λευτεράκης
- Directed by: Alekos Sakellarios
- Written by: Alekos Sakellarios
- Starring: Dinos Iliopoulos; Kostas Voutsas; Maro Kontou; Giorgos Konstadinou; Hristos Tsaganeas; Kaiti Panou; Katerina Gioulaki; Nikitas Platis; Margarita Athanasiou; Jenny Kyriakou
- Cinematography: Nikos Dimopoulos
- Edited by: Nikos Kavoukidis
- Music by: Gerasimos Lavranos
- Distributed by: Fimos Films
- Release date: 1963
- Running time: 95 minutes
- Country: Greece
- Language: Greek

O filos mou o Lefterakis (Greek: Greek: Ο φίλος μου ο Λευτεράκης, Alternate translations: My Friend, Lefterakis or Lefterakis, My Friend) is a 1963 Greek comedy film starring Dinos Iliopoulos, Kostas Voutsas and Maro Kontou.

== Plot ==
Thodoros (Dinos Iliopoulos) is an affluent civil engineer married to Fofo (Maro Kontou). He has come up with an imaginary friend, Lefterakis, and often claims that this friend of his visits Athens, so that he can have a night out with his mistress.

One evening, while in the middle of a card game with his friend Thanassis (Giorgos Konstantinou), Thodoros starts explaining the plan he came up with to him. The two of them are interrupted by the maid, who announces that Lefterakis has just arrived from Patras. Fofo, unaware of her husband's shock and of Thanassis' confusion, invites Lefterakis (Kostas Voutsas) to spend a couple of days at their place.

Over the next couple of days, Thodoros is becoming more and more paranoid; at first he suspects that someone is playing a prank on him; then, he thinks that he's being blackmailed; at last, since the fake Lefterakis seems to know a lot of details about Thodoros' life, the latter starts to think that he's losing his mind.

In the end, it is revealed that Fofo was aware of Thodoros' infidelity and of the whole "Lefterakis" plan. It is also revealed that Fofo had planned the sudden visit by the fake Lefterakis, by asking a friend to impersonate the imaginary friend, so as to teach her husband a lesson. Finally, the couple decides to put their differences aside when Fofo announces she's pregnant.

== Cast ==
- Dinos Iliopoulos ..... Thodorakis / Theodoros Vlassis
- Kostas Voutsas ..... Lefterakis / Eleftherios Tsambardis / Babis Davos
- Maro Kontou ..... Fofo Vlassi
- Giorgos Konstantinou ..... Thanassis Kadris
- Kaiti Panou ..... Eleni Kadri
- Christos Tsaganeas ..... Dr. Karatzamoulis
- Nikitas Platis ..... Madman
- Katerina Yioulaki ..... Katina
- Margarita Athanasiou ..... Rena

== Box office ==
The movie sold 61,734 tickets.

== Music ==
Songs: Mary-Linda, Manolis Hiotis and the Broyer sisters (Errika and Margarita)
