= Andreas Barkoulis =

Greek actor (1936–2016)

- Born: Ανδρέας Μπάρκουλης; 4 August 1936; Piraeus, Greece
- Died: 23 August 2016 (aged 80); Athens, Greece
- Occupation: Actor

Andreas Barkoulis (Greek: Ανδρέας Μπάρκουλης; 4 August 1936 – 23 August 2016) was a Greek actor. He graduated from the “Kostis Mihailides” drama school. He was among the most popular male actors of the 1950s and 1960s in Greece. Barkoulis, acted in 109 films and played in the theatre and television for over 50 years. He was considered such a heartthrob that a popular expression of the era was created for him: "Eh koritsia, o Barkoulis!" (Hey girls, it's Barkoulis!). He died on 23 August 2016 at the age of 80.

== Films ==
- Love in the Sand-dunes co-starring Aliki Vougiouklaki
- Siko Horepse Sirtaki ("Let's Dance the Sirtaki")
- Tsakitzis, protector of the poor, in the leading role as Çakırcalı Mehmet Efe.

== Roles ==
=== 1950s ===
- Maria Pentagiotissa (1957) ..... Dimitris Tourkakis
- To trellokoritso (1958) ..... Kostas
- To koritsi tis amartias (1958) ..... Giorgos
- O Mimikos kai i Mary (1958) ..... Mihalis Mimikos
- Ola gia to paidi tis (1958) ..... Kostas
- Mia Italida stin Ellada (1958) ..... Nikos Makrygiannis
- Makrya ap' ton kosmo (1958) ..... Evgenios Karmis
- Erotas stous ammolofous (1958) ..... stranger
- Diakopes stin Aigina (1958) ..... Jean
- To parastratima mias athoas (1959) ..... Dimitris
- Psit... koritsia! (1959) ..... Sakis
- O Thymios takane thalassa (1959) ..... Lakis Vranas
- Otan to misos kyverna (1959) ..... Andreas Dimopoulos
- O Giannos ki i Pagona (1959) ..... Giannos
- I limni ton stenagmon (1959) ..... Mouhtar
- Enas vlakas kai misos (1959) ..... Antonis
- Eglima sto Kolonaki (1959) ..... Dimitris Floras
- Anthismeni amygdalia (1959) ..... Georgios Drossinis

=== 1960s ===
- Moussitsa (1960) ..... Dimitris
- Moment of Passion (1960) ..... Nikos
- I Hionati kai ta 7 gerontopallikara (1960) ..... Paris Semeritis
- Tsakitzis, o prostatis ton ftohon (1960) ..... Tsakitzis
- To nisi tis agapis (1960) ..... Andreas
- To agori p' agapo (1960) ..... Dimitris Razis
- Stahtopouta (1960) ..... Petros
- Moro mou! (1960 ..... Giorgos
- Meta tin amartia (1960) ..... Giorgos
- Kassiani ymnodos (1960) ..... Theofilos
- Ta neiata theloun erota (1961) ..... Mihalis Markezis
- Matomena stefana (1961) ..... Dimos
- Mana mou, parastratisa (1961) ..... Petros
- Karagouna (1961) ..... Giorgis
- Lytrose me, agapi mou (1961) ..... Alkis
- Irthes arga (1962) ..... Dimitris Perotis
- Min eidate ton Panai? (1962) ..... Fanis
- Pezodromio (1962) ..... Giorgos
- Otan xypna to parelthon (1962) ..... Stefanos Gaitis
- O gero-Dimos (1962) ..... Liakos
- Klapse, ftohi mou kardia (1962) ..... Petros
- I Ellinida kai o erotas (1962) ..... narrator
- Exomologisis mias miteras (1962) ..... Andreas Vladis
- Agni kai atimasmeni (1962) ..... Petros
- Mana, giati me gennises (1963) ..... Kyriakos Vagias
- Ligo prin ximerosei (1963) ..... Nikos
- I kardia tis manas (1963) ..... Kostas
- To doloma (1964) ..... cabaret customer
- Sholi gia soferines (1964) ..... Dinos
- 'Enomenoi sti zoi kai sto thanato (1964) ..... Drosos
- Alygisti sti zoi (1964) ..... Akis
- Jenny Jenny (1966) ..... Nikos Mantas
- O xypolytos pringips (1966) ..... El-Rassid
- Koinonia, ora miden (1966) ..... Fotis Dimitriou
- 'Viva Rena (1967) ..... Antonio
- O spangorammenos (1967) ..... Giorgos Fylaktos
- Mias pentaras neiata (1967) ..... Dimitris Valaskos
- Kontserto gia polyvola (1967) ..... Italian spy
- Olga agapi mou (1968) ..... Alekos
- Sta synora tis prodosias (1968) ..... Kostas Dimou
- Poly arga gia dakrya (1968) ..... Alexis Vrettos
- Brosta stin aghoni (1968) ..... Alekos Livas
- Gymnoi sto dromo (1969) ..... Xenia's friend
- O Agios Nektarios (1969) ..... Tasos Mandas
- Otan i polis pethaini (1969) ..... Thoris
- Isaia... mi horeveis (1969) ..... Haris
- Enas afragos Onasis (1969) ..... Iasonas Zoumberis

=== 1970s ===
- Mia zoi horis agapi (1970) ..... Angelos
- Mia trelli... trelli... sarantara (1970) ..... Takis
- Krima... to boi sou (1970) ..... Dimitris Rodanas
- I zougla ton poleon (1970) ..... Stefanos Rokos
- I theia mou, i hipissa (1970) ..... Stefanos Kriezis
- Enas Vengos gia oles tis douleies (1970) ..... narrator (uncredited)
- Enas trellos glentzes (1970) ..... Dinos Kaliabesis
- Idiotiki mou zoi (1971) ..... police investigator
- Kreuzfahrt des Grauens (1971) ..... Haris
- teitai epeigontos gabros (1971) ..... Angelos Floras
- I efoplistina (1971) ..... Jack
- Enas yperohos anthropos (1971) ..... Nikos
- Diamantia sto gymno sou soma' (1972) ..... Grekos
- Oi thisavroi tis vermacht (1972) ..... Wilhelm Kurt
- Pio thermi kai ap' ton ilio (1972) ..... Giorgos Stavrou
- O ehthros tou laou (1972) ..... Vlahopoulos
- Erotas kai prodosia (1972) ..... Alexis Mourouzis
- Ekviastai (1973) ..... Seretis (as Andrew Calman)
- She Knew No Other Way (1973) ..... Andy
- Strange Girl In Love (1973) ..... Alexis Lismanis
- House On The Rocks (1974) ..... Andreas
- Ransom Baby (1976) ..... Kurt
- I valitsa tou papa (1978) ..... Alkis

=== 1980s ===
- The Ambitious Lover (1982) ..... Aris Platonas
- Love Me Not? (1989) ..... Giorgos
