= I Soferina =

I soferina Η Σωφερίνα
- Directed by: Alekos Sakellarios; Kostas Lychnaras (crew); Takis Vougiouklakis (crew)
- Written by: Giorgos Roussos
- Starring: Alekos Alexandrakis; Giorgos Pantzas; Giorgos Konstantinou; Dionysis Papagiannopoulos; Vasilis Avlonitis; Aliki Vougiouklaki; Maro Kontou; Kaiti Lambropoulou; Kostas Papachristos
- Cinematography: Aristeidis Karydis-Fuchs
- Music by: Gerasimos Lavranos
- Distributed by: Damaskinos-Mihailidis, Aigaion Film; G. Roussos & Ass.
- Release date: 26 October 1964
- Running time: 98 mins
- Country: Greece
- Language: Greek

I soferina (Greek: Η Σωφερίνα, The Chauffeur Lady) is a 1964 Greek theatrical comedy film written by Giorgos Roussos. It was adaptation of a play written by Roussos.

== Cast ==
- Alekos Alexandrakis as Nikos Diamantidis
- Giorgos Pantzas]] as Takis Maragkakis
- Giorgos Konstantinou as Mihalis Haridimos
- Dionysis Papagiannopoulos as a judge chief
- Vasilis Avlonitis as Nikolaos Spanovangelodimitris-Gylos
- Aliki Vougiouklaki as Mary Diamantidou
- Maro Kontou as Lilly Haridimou
- Kaiti Lambropoulou as Aikaterini Toufexi
- Alkis Giannakas as Pakis P
- Tasos Giannopoulos as Evangelos Fanouridos (police traffic officer)
- hodoros Katsadramis as Spyros
- Kostas Papahristos as a warden
- Giorgos Velentzas as a photographer
- Costas Hajihristos as an organist
- Joly Garbi as Evterpi Karavangeli
- Kleo Skouloudi as Kalliopi
- Montage as Aristidis Karydis-Fuchs

== Music ==
- Songwriter: Alekos Sakellarios
- Songs sung by: Trio Athene
- Bouzouki solo: Giorgos Zambetas
