= Giannis Dalianidis =

Greek film director

- Born: 31 December 1923; Thessaloniki, Greece
- Died: 16 October 2010 (aged 86); Athens, Greece
- Occupation: Director
- Years active: 1941–2000

Giannis Dalianidis (Greek: Γιάννης Δαλιανίδης; 31 December 1923 – 16 October 2010) was a Greek film director.

His first film was Mousitsa, released in 1959, which was followed by a series of musicals. Between 1974 and 1981, he produced the television series Luna Park. In 2002, he was dubbed a "national film hero" at the International Thessaloniki Film Festival.

== Biography ==
Giannis Dalianidis was born in Thessaloniki on 31 December 1923. He started his career as a dancer under the nickname Giannis Dal. From 1958, he worked in cinema, initially as a screenwriter and afterwards as a director. In 1959 he directed his first film, Mousitsa and sometime later Laos kai Kolonaki.

In 1961 he started to cooperate with the Finos Films the most successful Greek film production company. He directed such films as The Downhill, Liar Wanted, and Gorgones ke Manges, among others. Dalianidis mainly excelled in musical films. This genre, in Greece, is today closely related with Dalianidis. He directed over 70 films and 10 television series.

Dalianidis died at Henry Dunant Hospital Center, on 16 October 2010, at age 86.

== Selected filmography ==
Year	Greek title	English title
1961	Ο Κατήφορος	The Downhill
1961	Ζητείται ψεύτης	Liar Wanted
1961	Ο σκληρός άνδρας	The Tough Guy
1962	Νόμος 4000	Law No. 4000
1962	Ο ατσίδας	The Wise Guy
1962	Μερικοί το προτιμούν κρύο	Some Like it Cool
1963	Ίλιγγος	Iligos
1964	Κάτι να καίει	Something is Burning
1964	Η χαρτοπαίχτρα	The Card Player
1965	Τέντυ μπόι αγάπη μου	Teddy Boy My Love
1965	Ιστορία μιας ζωής	Story of a Life
1965	Κορίτσια για φίλημα	Kiss the Girls
1965	Φωνάζει ο κλέφτης	The Robber Complains
1965	Ένα Έξυπνο Έξυπνο... Μούτρο	A Smart Smart... Face
1967	Οι Θαλασσιές οι Χάντρες	The Blue Beads
1968	Γοργόνες και Μάγκες	Mermaids and Rascals
1969	Γυμνοί στο δρόμο	Naked in the Street
1971	Ο κατεργάρης	The Dodger
1971	Μαριχουάνα Στοπ	Marijuana Stop!
1974	Εραστές του ονείρου	The Dream Lovers
1975	Ένα τανκς... στο κρεβάτι μου	A Tank... in My Bed
1982	Βασικά... Καλησπέρα σας	Good Evening to You
