= Phaedon Georgitsis =

Greek actor (1939–2019)

Phaedon Georgitsis Φαίδων Γεωργίτσης
- Born: 21 January 1939; Athens
- Died: 1 March 2019 (aged 80); Athens
- Occupation: actor

Phaedon Georgitsis (Greek: Φαίδων Γεωργίτσης; 21 January 1939 – 1 March 2019) was a Greek actor. He was a popular actor in Greek, starring in many films, 13 of which were produced by Finos Film. He was also one of the main protagonist of Greek theatre and was referred to as "Greece's James Dean". He died on 1 March 2019, after a battle with brain cancer.

== Films ==
- The Red Lanterns
- Gorgones ke Manges (Mermaids and Lads)
- Blood on the Land
- Marijuana Stop!
