= Maro Kontou =

Greek actress and politician (1934–2026)

- Μάρω Κοντού
- Kontou in 2008

Member of the Hellenic Parliament for Athens A
- In office 29 July 1999 – 11 February 2004
- In office 22 December 2006 – 18 August 2007

Personal details
- Born: Marianthe Kontou; 21 June 1934 Athens, Greece
- Died: 15 July 2026 (aged 92) Athens, Greece
- Party: New Democracy
- Spouse(s): Aristeidis Karydis-Fuchs (m. 1960; div. 1962) Giorgos Doxas (m. 1975; div. 1980)
- Occupation: Actress

Marianthi "Maro" Kontou (Greek: Μαριάνθη (Μάρω) Κοντού; 21 June 1934 – 15 July 2026) was a Greek actress and politician. She performed in the theatre and in more than sixty films from 1954 onwards. Kontou was a member of the Hellenic Parliament from 1999 to 2007, representing the Athens A constituency and elected as a member of New Democracy.

Kontou died from lung cancer on 15 July 2026, at the age of 92, following a period of hospitalisation for a respiratory condition at the Attikon Hospital in Athens.

== Selected filmography ==
Film
Year	Title	Role	Notes
1960	Egklima sta paraskinia	Elena Pavlidi	
1960	Ta kitrina gantia	Rena Kaligaridi	
1961	Woe to the Young	Rita	
1961	Antigone	Ismene	
1964	I Soferina	Lili Haridimou	
1964	My Friend Lefterakis	Fofo Vlassi	
1965	And the Wife Shall Revere Her Husband	Eleni Kokovikou	
1966	Ah! Kai na 'moun antras	Stella / Alekos	
1972	Symmoria eraston	Elena Vagiannou	
2012	What If...	Eleni Kokovikou	
