= Nitsa Marouda =

Greek actress (1935–2022)

- Νίτσα Μαρούδα
- Born: Eleni Marouda; 5 May 1935; Patras, Greece
- Died: 10 November 2022 (aged 87); Athens, Greece
- Occupation: Actress

Eleni Marouda (Greek: Ελένη Νίτσα Μαρούδα; 5 May 1935 – 10 November 2022) was a Greek actress.

== Life and career ==
Born in Patras, Marouda studied acting at the Theofanidis School and made her official debut in 1960, in the Kostas Karagiannis' film To agrimi. Specialized in comedic roles, she had an intense career in films and television spanning two decades; she retired in 1982.

Marouda died of a heart attack on 10 November 2022, at the age of 87. Her daughter, Ioanna, is married to politician Vangelis Meimarakis.
