= Dinos Iliopoulos =

Greek actor and director (1913–2001)

- Ντίνος Ηλιόπουλος
- Born: Konstantinos Iliopoulos; 12 June 1913; Alexandria, Egypt
- Died: 4 June 2001 (aged 87); Athens, Greece
- Resting place: First Cemetery of Athens
- Citizenship: Egypt (until 1929); France (1929–1935); Greece (from 1935); United States (1974–1975); Canada (1974–1975)
- Occupations: Actor; director; comedian; playwright; singer; dancer; presenter
- Years active: 1944–1999
- Employer: Finos Film
- Spouse: Hildegard Wintzer (m. 1963)
- Children: 2
- Awards: Order of George I

Konstantinos Iliopoulos (Greek: Κωνσταντίνος Ηλιόπουλος; 12 June 1913 – 4 June 2001) was a Greek actor, director, and playwright. He was one of the most prevalent actors in Greece.

== Biography ==
He was born in Alexandria, Egypt in 1913. A few years later his family moved to Marseille and there he finished high school. He permanently relocated to Greece in 1935 at the age of 22 started studying at the Berkshire High Commercial School in Athens and also studied acting at the Drama School of Giannoulis Sarantidis. In 1944, he made his stage debut at the Katerina Andreadi Theatre with the play of Leo Lenz's Lady I Love You, and in cinema he debuted in 1948 in the film 100,000 Pounds. In 1963, he became theatrical entrepreneur founded his own theatre Gloria (Γκλόρια) at Ippokratous Street in Athens.

He played in more than 70 films, usually as leading actor. In 1956 he starred in the film O Drakos (The Ogre of Athens) that is considered as one of the ten best Greek films of all times by Greek Film Critics Association. Other important roles of his were in the films Ζiteitai Pseftis, Thanasakis o Politevomenos, Makrykostaioi kai Kondogiorgides, O Atsidas, To Koroidaki tis Despoinidas, Kyries tis Avlis, Stournara 288, My Friend Lefterakis and others.

In 1970s, Ntinos Iliopoulos was relocated in USA and Canada for about two years due to his financial difficulties at where was playing various theatrical plays travelling in different states.

Iliopoulos was married twice. His first marriage lasted only a few months. He married his second wife, Austrian Hildegard Wintzer (1941–2008), in 1963. They had two daughters, Evita (b. 1964), and Hilda (b. 1972), who is an actress.

Iliopoulos suffered from ileus on 12 April 2001 and he was taken to Central Clinic of Athens, where he underwent surgery. He died in intensive care after 53 days of hospitalization, and a struggle with his respiratory system following many cardiac arrests, at 7:15 p.m. on 4 June 2001, at age 87.

He was buried at public expense on 6 June 2001 at the First Cemetery of Athens, and according to his wish, on his cemetery grave there is a plaque writes "Excuse me ladies that I can not stand up" (Greek: Με συγχωρείτε κυρίες μου, που δεν μπορώ να σηκωθώ).

== Selected filmography ==
Feature Films
Year	Original Title	Adapted Title	Role
1948	Εκατό χιλιάδες λίρες	100,000 Pounds	Hronis
1948	Μαντάμ Σουσού	Madam Sousou	
1949	Διαγωγή μηδέν	Zero for Conduct	Platon Papadakis
1950	Τα αρραβωνιάσματα	The Engagement	Kostas Lazarou
1950	Οι απάχηδες των Αθηνών	Scoundrels of Athens	Kleon
1951	Τα τέσσερα σκαλοπάτια	The Four Steps	Christos Garopoulos
1952	Προπαντός ψυχραιμία	Above All, Keep Cool	Fikis
1952	Ο πύργος των ιπποτών	The Tower of the Knights	Agisilaos
1953	Εύα	Eva	Nasos
1953	Ο γρουσούζης	The Grouch	Aristides
1954	Νυχτερινή περιπέτεια	Nocturnal Adventure	
1954	Χαρούμενο ξεκίνημα	The Happy Beginning	Friend of George
1954	Θανασάκης ο πολιτευόμενος	Thanassakis, the Politician	Meletis Kaplanis
1955	Τζο ο τρομερός	Joe the Tremendous	Tzortzis Rouvakas (Tzo)
1955	Γλέντι, λεφτά κι αγάπη	Partying, Money and Love	Damianos
1956	Ο δράκος	The Ogre	Thomas
1957	Της τύχης τα γραμμένα	What Fate Holds	Iordanis
1958	Μέλπω	Melpo	
1958	Μια λατέρνα, μια ζωή	One Street Organ, One Life	Thanasis
1958	Κάθε εμπόδιο για καλό	Every Cloud Has a Silver Lining	Kostis
1958	4 νύφες 1 γαμπρός	Four Brides, One Groom	Alkis Makridis
1959	Γαμήλιες περιπέτειες	Matrimonial Adventures	Ntinos Agapitos
1959	Να πεθερός, να μάλαμα	A Father-in-Law With a Heart of Gold	Aristides
1959	Αμαρυλλίς, το κορίτσι της αγάπης	Amaryllis (The Girl of Love)	Anestis
1959	Στουρνάρα 288: Φτώχεια και αριστοκρατία	288 Stournara Street - Poverty and aristocracy	Platon
1960	Καλημέρα Αθήνα	Goodmorning, Athens	Totos
1960	Χριστίνα	Christina	Lazaros
1960	Το κοροϊδάκι της δεσποινίδος	The Maiden's Fool	Gregory
1960	Μακρυκωσταίοι και Κοντογιώργηδες	Makrykostases and Kontogiorgises	Stelios Kontogiorgis
1960	Οικογένεια Παπαδοπούλου	Papadopoulos Family	Minas Karasparidis
1960	Τρεις κούκλες και εγώ	Three Dolls and I	Manolis
1961	Ζητείται ψεύτης	Liar Wanted	Thodoros Parlas
1962	Ο ατσίδας	The Sly Guy	Alekos Kourouzos
1962	Η κυρία του κυρίου	The Lady of the Gentleman	Minas Kaloudis
1962	Μερικοί το προτιμούν κρύο	Some Like It Cool	Lakis Aggelou
1963	Παλικαράκια της παντρειάς	Eligible Youths	Kosmas
1963	Ο φίλος μου ο Λευτεράκης	My Friend Lefterakis	Theodoros Vlassis
1964	Το δόλωμα	The Bait	Manthos
1964	Κάτι να καίει	Something Hot	Ntinos Exarxopoulos
1964	Οι κληρονόμοι	The Heirs	Rikos
1965	Φωνάζει ο κλέφτης	The Robber Cries Thief!	Timoleon Lambrou
1966	Οι κυρίες της αυλής	Ladies of the Courtyard	Pipis Kathistos
1966	Ό,τι λάμπει είναι χρυσός	All that Glitters Is Gold	Inspector Lambrou
1966	Να ζει κανείς ή να μη ζει;	To Be or Not to Be	Minas
1967	Η κοροϊδάρα	The Big Fool	Ntinos Ntinos
1967	Ο γεροντοκόρος	The Old Bachelor	Telephone Joker
1967	Ο ανακατωσούρας	The Busybody	Thomas Karatoulpanis
1967	Ο κόσμος τρελάθηκε	The World Has Gone Mad	Lykourgos Karanikolareas
1968	Ο σατράπης	The Despot	Napoleon Ntouros
1968	Ο πιο καλός ο μαθητής	The Valedictorian	Diamantis Petrofoukis
1968	Η Αθήνα μετά τα μεσάνυχτα	Athens After Midnight	Himself
1969	Ο θαυματοποιός	The Miracle-Worker	Philippas Feloukas
1969	Ο Στρατής παραστράτησε	Stratis Has Strayed	Stratis Damalakis
1970	Οι 4 άσσοι	The Four Aces	Fotis Gemelos
1970	Να 'τανε το 13 να 'πεφτε σε μας	If Only We Won The Lottery	Lampis Lamperos
1972	Οι εκβιασταί	The Extortionists	Petros Romanos
1972	Συμμορία εραστών	The Gang of Lovers	Renos Kampanas
1979	Οι φανταρίνες	Female Soldiers	Army Major Adamastos
1979	Τζακ ο καβαλάρης	Jack the Horseman	Don Kornilio
1980	Ο ποδόγυρος	The Hemline	Stathis Stavropoulos
1980	Ξεβράκωτος Ρωμιός	Greek Man, Exposed	Nikos
1980	Πονηρό θηλυκό, κατεργάρα γυναίκα	Cunning Female, Evil Woman	Petros
1981	Κατάσκοπος Νέλλη	Nelly the Spy	Κος Schultz
1981	Γκαρσονιέρα για 10	Bachelor's Pad for Ten	Ministry Inspector
1981	Ο Κώτσος έξω από το ΝΑΤΟ	Kotsos Outside NATO	Tom Americo
1981	Ένας κοντός θα μας σώσει!	A Short Man Will Save Us	Spyros Apostolou
1982	Ξυπόλητα καμάκια	Flirting Barefoot	Leon
1982	Μια φορά και έναν καιρό	Once upon a time	
1982	Εδώ και τώρα αγγούρια. Πόσα φάγατε σήμερα;	Cucumbers Here and Now How many did you have today?	
1982	Ρόδα, τσάντα και κοπάνα	Wheels, Schoolbag and Hookey	
1982	Μάγκες και Μόρτισσες	Tough Guys and Gals	Fokas
1982	Απίθανοι, αλλιώτικοι κι ωραίοι	Amazing, Different and Handsome	Markos
1983	Άλλος για τον παράδεισο	Next One for Paradise?	
1983	Άγριες πλάκες στα θρανία	Wild Jokes in the Classroom	Xaramadas
1983	Δάσκαλε που δίδασκες	Teacher, What Did You Preach?	Lyceum Principal
1983	Στα σαγόνια της εφορίας	In the Jaws of the Revenue Department	Charalambos Kostopoulos
1983	Μια παπαδιά στα μπουζούκια	A Priest's Wife at the Bouzouki Joints	Pericles
1984	Άλλος για τον παράδεισο	Next One for Paradise?	Iezekil
1984	Ροκάκιας την ημέρα, το βράδυ καμαριέρα	Rocker in the Morning, Chambermaid at Night	Tsakmakis
1984	Ο αδέξιος εραστής	Clumsy Lover	Agis
1984	Ρόδα, τσάντα και κοπάνα 3	Wheels, Schoolbag and Hookey 3	Archimedes
1984	Και κλάααμα... στα σχολεία	Lamentation in Education	Highschool Principal
1985	Τα τούβλα	The Bricks	Andreas
1985	Κορίτσια για τσίμπημα	Girls for Pinching	Lyceum Principal
1985	Μια γυναικάρα στα μπουζούκια	A Foxy Lady at the Bouzouki Joints	Periklis
1985	Ο ιππότης της λακούβας	The Pothole Knight	Hercules Kelas
1986	Ο μελισσοκόμος	The Beekeper	Projector Mechanic
1987	Κατάσκοποι της συμφοράς	Woeful Spies	Agapon
1987	Πόντιος είμαι, ό,τι θέλω κάνω	I Am a Pontic Greek and I Do As I Please	Ntinos
1988	Ο αυτάκιας	The Aftakias	
1989	Υπέρ επείγον	Super Urgent	Sfyriou
1995	Ράδιο Μόσχα	Radio Moscow	Receptionist
1997	Το παλτό	The Coat	
