= Kostas Papachristos =

Greek actor (1916–1995)

Kostas Papachristos Κώστας Παπαχρήστος
- Born: 1916; Volos, Greece
- Died: 29 September 1995 (aged 78–79); Athens, Greece
- Occupation: actor

Kostas Papachristos (Greek: Κώστας Παπαχρήστος; 1916 – 29 September 1995) was a Greek actor who was known for his comedic acting roles.

== Biography ==
He was born in Volos in 1916 and died in Athens in 1995. He was the husband of Dimitra Seremeti (b. 1933) and brother of the actor Nikos Papachristos. He played mostly military, police and other roles. His marriage was childless.

== Filmography ==
| Year | Film | Transliteration and translation | Role |
|---|---|---|---|
| 1960 | Ochyro 27 | Οχυρό 27 | - |
| 1957 | The Aunt from Chicago | Η θεία απ' το Σικαγο; I theia ap΄ to Sikago | officer |
| 1959 | Enas vlakas ke missos | Ένας βλάκας και μισός (An Idiot and a Half) | Anastassis |
| 1960 | Ilias of the 16th | Ο Ηλίας του 16ου O Ilias tou 16ou | officer |
| 1960 | Christina | Χριστίνα | - |
| 1960 | Makrykostaioi kai Kontogiorgides | Μακρυκωσταίοι και Κοντογιώργηδες | officer (Pandelis) |
| 1961 | Aliki in the Navy | Η Αλίκη στο ναυτικό | commander |
| 1963 | Fortunately without Work | Ευτυχώς χωρίς δουλειά Eftychos horis doulia | officer |
| 1963 | Afto to kati allo | Αυτό το κάτι άλλο (That Special Something) | officer |
| 1965 | Teddy boy, My Love | Τέντυ μπόι αγάπη μου (-agapi mou) | - |
| 1964 | I Soferina | Η σωφερίνα | officer |
| 1967 | Welcome the Dollar | Καλώς ήλθε το δολάριο Kalos ilthe to dollario | Egissilaos |
| 1970 | Ti kanei o anthropos gia na zisi | Τι κάνει ο άνθρωπος για να ζήση | rich man |
| 1971 | Ypovrychio Pananikolis | Υποβρύχιο Παπανικολής | - |
| 1984 | Ela na gymnothoume, darling | Έλα να γυμνωθούμε, ντάρλινγκ | Panagiorgis |
| 1988 | Palikari sta thrania | Παλικάρι στα θρανία | - |
