= Periklis Christoforidis =

Greek actor

Periklis Christoforides
- Born: 1907; Trebizond, Ottoman Empire
- Died: 30 September 1983 (aged 75–76); Thessaloniki, Greece
- Occupation: Actor
- Years active: 1929–1979

Periklis Christoforides (1907 – 30 September 1983) was an Ottoman-born Greek film actor. He appeared in more than 120 films between 1929 and 1979. He was born in Trebizond, Ottoman Empire, and died in Thessaloniki, Greece, following a stroke. His body was flown to Athens on the day of his death and buried the next day.

== Selected filmography ==
- Madame X (1956) ..... Giannakis Spiggos
- The Fortune Teller (1956) ..... Andreas Giavasis / Velliris
- The Girl from Corfu (1956)
- We Have Only One Life (1958) ..... Manolis
- A Hero in His Slippers (1958) ..... minister
- Liar Wanted (1961) ..... Agis
- The Downfall (1961) ..... Filippas Kyriazopoulos
- Something Is Burning (1964) ..... Mr. Nikolaidis
- I chartopaichtra (1964) ..... Andreas's friend
- Allos gia to ekatommyrio (1964) ..... Leonidas Karpidis
- Kiss the Girls (1965) ..... Mr. Eleftheriou
- Voitheia! O Vengos faneros praktor 000 (1967) ..... school director
- Thou-Vou falakros praktor, epiheirisis "Yis Mathiam" (1969) ..... school director
