= Dimitris Papamichael =

Greek actor and director

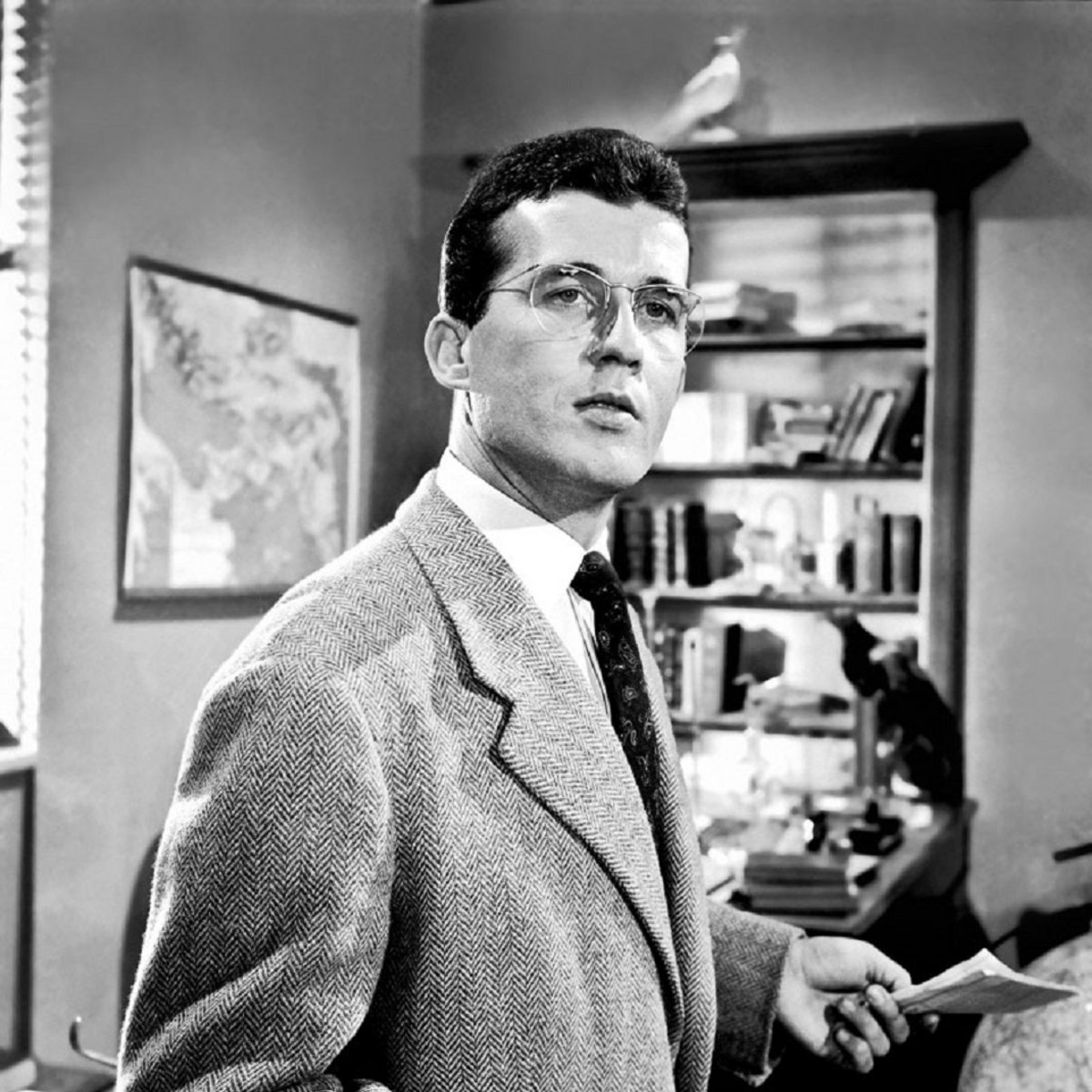
- Born: 29 August 1934; Piraeus, Greece
- Died: 8 August 2004 (aged 69); Kranidi, Greece
- Resting place: First Cemetery of Athens
- Height: 1.76
- Spouse(s): Aliki Vougiouklaki; Mina Heimona; Nadia Mourouzi
- Children: Giannis Papamichael

Dimitris Papamichael (Greek: Δημήτρης Παπαμιχαήλ Greek pronunciation: [ðiˈmitɾis papamixaˈil]; 29 August 1934 - 8 August 2004) was a popular Greek actor and director. In 1965, he married Aliki Vougiouklaki, the so-called "national star" of Greece, whom he met at the National Theatre of Greece Drama School. The star couple remained married for a decade, co-starring in several films that marked the "golden era" of Greek cinema. His second marriage was to Nana Eilikrini and lasted until 1990. In the 1990s he had a relationship with actress Mina Heimona. His last partner, up to his death, was the actress Nadia Mourouzi.

== Selected filmography ==
- The Auntie from Chicago (1957)
- A Matter of Dignity (1957)
- Astero (1959)
- To Ksilo Vgike Ap' Ton Paradiso (1959)
- I Aliki Sto Nautiko (1960)
- Never on Sunday (1960)
- Madalena (1960)
- I Yperifani (1962)
- Chtipokardia Sto Thranio (1963)
- The Red Lanterns (1963)
- Oh! That Wife of Mine (1967)
- Ipolochagos Natassa (1971)
- Papaflessas (1971)
- Erastes tou oneirou (1974)
