= Dimitris Psathas =

Greek satirist and playwright

Dimitris Psathas (Greek: Δημήτρης Ψαθάς; 1907 – 13 November 1979) was a modern Greek satirist and playwright. He was born in Trabzon of Pontos, then part of the Ottoman Empire, in 1907.

He went to Athens in 1923 and finished his studies whereupon he devoted himself to both journalism and the theatre. In 1937, his first book was published Justice is in a good mood, followed the next year by Justice is in a bad mood. He became known for his book Madam Sousou. He wrote many successful theatrical plays. Christos Alexiou describes his theatrical work as "polite comedies" which supplied "relief during the occupation and civil wars". He also wrote a 500-page historical chronicle about the resistance of his compatriots entitled Land of Pontos. As a journalist, he has been described as one of the country's principal columnists during the mid-1970s.

He died in Athens in 1979.
