= Giannis Vogiatzis =

Greek actor (born 1926)

- Γιάννης Βογιατζής
- Born: Ioannis Vogiatzis; 16 December 1926 (age 99); Aitoliko, Greece
- Citizenship: Greece
- Education: National Theatre of Greece Drama School; University of Piraeus (attended)
- Occupation: Actor
- Years active: 1955–2023
- Employer: Finos Film
- Spouse: Vasiliki Vogiatzi (died 2018)
- Children: 1

Ioannis Vogiatzis (Greek: Ιωάννης Βογιατζής; born 16 December 1926) is a Greek actor of theatre, cinema, and television.

== Biography ==
Giannis m Vogiatzis was born on 16 December 1926, in Aitoliko. He studied at the National Theatre of Greece Drama School and for some time at the University of Piraeus as well. He first appeared onstage in 1955, right after his graduation, in the play by William Shakespeare, ''The Merchant of Venice'' held at the Dionyssia Theater.

On the silver screen, Vogiatzis made his debut in 1957 in the movie Laterna, Ftoheia kai Garyfallo. He has since worked with several theatrical groups, leading the group quite a few times. His comedic talent has rendered him a household name in radio broadcasting, cinema and television. (I gitonia mas and O oniroparmenos)

Vogiatzis has appeared in 68 films, mainly in comedic roles. His favorite productions include: I gynaika mou trelathike, Mia Italida ap' tin Kypseli, Despoinis Dievthyntis, Ena koritsi gia dyo, O Klearch, i Marina ki o Kontos, Tha se Kano Vasilissa, Nyhta Gamou (Wedding Night), The Mother's Child and O Mikes Pantrevetai.

In 2022, Vogiatzis was nominated for the Hellenic Film Academy's Iris Award for Best Supporting Actor for his performance as Polycarpos in Smyrna my Beloved.

Vogiatzis is the cousin of the late singer and actor Giannis Vogiatzis (1934–2023) with whom he shares both name and surname.

Vogiatzis married Vasiliki and they had a son, Konstantinos (b. 1969). Vasiliki died in 2018.

His last performance in theatre was in 2023.

== Filmography ==
Year	Film	Original Title and Translation	Role
1957	Laterna, ftocheia kai garyfallo	Λατέρνα, φτώχεια και γαρύφαλλο (Barrel Piano, Poverty and Carnation)	Obstetrician-Gynecologist
1958	O tzitzikas ki o mermigkas	Ο τζίτζικας κι ο μέρμηγκας (The Cicada and the Ant)	-
1959	O thisavros tou makariti	Ο θησαυρός του μακαρίτη (Dead Man's Treasure)	Attorney-at-Law, Legal Counsel
1960	Oikogeneia Papadopoulou	Οικογένεια Παπαδοπούλου (The Papadopoulos Family)	-
1961	I Liza kai i alli	Η Λίζα και η άλλη (Liza and the other girl)	Giorgos
1962	Zito i trela	Ζήτω η τρέλα (Hurray for Madness)	Tilemachos
1962	O vasilias tis gkafas	Ο βασιλιάς της γκάφας (The King of Bungling)	Thrassyvoulos
1962	Otan leipei i gata	Όταν λείπει η γάτα (When the cat is away)	-
1962	Merikoi to protimoun kryo	Μερικοί το προτιμούν κρύο (Some like it cold)	Thodoros
1962	I kyria tou kyriou	Η κυρία του κυρίου (The Lady of the Gentleman)	-
1963	Polytechnitis kai erimospitis	Πολυτεχνίτης κι ερημοσπίτης (Jack of all trades, Master of none)	a restaurant customer
1963	Ena koritsi gia dyo	Ένα κορίτσι για δύο (A girl for two)	Prokopis, Dry Cleaning Proprietor
1964	I vila ton orgion	Η βίλα των οργίων (The Orgy Villa)	Antonis, Police Officer
1964	Tha se kano vasilissa	Θα σε κάνω βασίλισσα (I Will Make You a Queen)	Gerasimos, Store Employee
1964	O paras ki o foukaras	Ο παράς κι ο φουκαράς (The Wealth and the Wretch)	Michalis, Bank Staff Member
1964	Lola	Λόλα (Lola)	a cabaret waiter
1964	Despoinis diefthyntis	Δεσποινίς διευθυντής (Madam Director)	Vassilis, Janitor
1964	To vlakomoutro	Το βλακόμουτρο	Manolis
1965	Koritsia gia filima	Κορίτσια για φίλημα (The Kissable Ladies)	Jim Pappas
1966	Rantevou ston aera	Ραντεβού στον αέρα (Rendezvous Aloft)	Air Force Commander Vangelis Grimpas
1966	Oloi oi antres einai idioi	Όλοι οι άνδρες είναι ίδιοι (All men are the same)	Nikos
1966	I gynaika mou trelathike	Η γυναίκα μου τρελάθηκε (My wife has gone crazy)	Giorgos, Neurologist
1967	Oi thalassies oi chantres	Οι θαλασσιές οι χάντρες (The turquoise beads)	Memas Gardoubas
1967	Nychta Gamou	Νύχτα γάμου (Wedding Night)	Anestis Triantafyllou, Divorce Attorney
1968	O Mikes pandrevetai	Ο Μικές παντρεύεται (Mikes is getting married)	Mikes Pardaloglou
1968	Mia kyria sta bouzoukia	Μια κυρία στα μπουζούκια	Thanassis Massouros
1968	Mia Italida ap' tin Kypseli	Μια Ιταλίδα απ' την Κυψέλη (An Italian Woman from Kypseli)	Polykratis, Furniture Manufacturer
1968	Gorgones kai Magkes	Γοργόνες και μάγκες	Panagis, Local Tavern Owner
1971	Zousa monachos horis agapi	Ζούσα μοναχός χωρίς αγάπη (I lived alone without love)	Theoharis
1971	Oi antres kseroun n' agapoun	Οι άντρες ξέρουν ν' αγαπούν (Men know how to love)	Apostolis
1973	Enas trelos trelos aeropeiratis	Ένας τρελός τρελός αεροπειρατής (One crazy crazy hijacker)	Hijacker's Uncle, Naval Commander
1983	Roda, tsanta kai kopana 2	Ρόδα, τσάντα και κοπάνα 2	Damianos
1983	Boroume kai kato ap' ta thrania	Μπορούμε και κάτω απ' τα θρανία	Lykeiarchis
1983	Agries plakes sta thrania	Άγριες πλάκες στα θρανία	high-school professor
1984	Trelos eimai, oti thelo kano	Τρελός είμαι, ό,τι θέλω κάνω (I am crazy and I do as I please)	Dr Anaximandros Trelidis
1984	Roda, tsanta kai kopana 3	Ρόδα, τσάντα και κοπάνα 3	Damianos
1984	An itan to violi pouli	Αν ήταν το βιολί πουλί	Prison Inmate Vlassis Boukas
2021	Smyrna my Beloved	Σμύρνη μου αγαπημένη	Polycarpos
