= Thessaloniki Film Festival =

Cultural institution

The Thessaloniki Film Festival is a Thessaloniki-based cultural institution focusing on cinema. The Institution organizes the Thessaloniki International Film Festival every November and the Thessaloniki Documentary Festival every March, while its year-long activity includes the Thessaloniki Cinema Museum and the Thessaloniki Cinemateque, as well as screenings and special tributes held throughout the year, and educational programs. The Thessaloniki Film Festival is the largest film institution in Greece, its activity attracting more than 300.000 visitors yearly.

== Mission ==
The Thessaloniki Film Festival aims to promote film culture and education, to support the domestic and international film industry, to form partnerships with national and international cultural institutions and to promote the unique cultural identity of Thessaloniki.

== Activity ==
At the heart of the Thessaloniki Film Festival activity lie its two annual festivals:

- The Thessaloniki International Film Festival, held in November, one of the oldest film festivals worldwide and one of the leading film events in Southeast Europe, attracting an audience of more than 80.000 each year.
- The Thessaloniki Documentary Festival, held in March, which ranks among the most prestigious documentary festivals globally.

The Institution activity further includes:

1. The Thessaloniki Cinema Museum, the largest cinema museum in Greece.
2. The Thessaloniki Cinemateque, holding screenings, tributes and retrospectives to major filmmakers throughout the year.
3. The Film Library, the largest library dedicated to cinema in the Balkans, comprising 15.000 volumes.
4. The Thessaloniki Film Festival publications.
5. Four cinemas, two at the “Olympion” theater and two at Warehouse 1 at the Thessaloniki port, screening first run films throughout the year.
6. Film screenings and tribute programs across Greece in partnership with local institutions.
7. Open-air screenings at open-air cinemas and at various locations in Thessaloniki.
8. The Thessaloniki Film Festival digital archive, available at www.myfestival.gr. The online archive includes festival catalogues, rare publications, magazines and books, many of which are out of print.
9. The rare HELLAFFI collection, designated a cultural heritage monument by the General Directorate of Antiquities and Cultural Heritage. The collection, comprising giant film posters, pencil drafts, lithographs, watercolor and Indian ink paintings, is exhibited at the festival premises and it's available through its digital archive.
10. Film screenings throughout the year at the two cinemas of the “Olympion” Complex and at “John Cassavetes” and “Stavros Tornes” theaters at the Thessaloniki port.

== Premises ==
The Institution is housed at the historical “Olympion” theater at the central Aristotelous Square, where its offices and “Olympion” and “Pavlos Zannas” cinemas are located. The Olympion Complex also houses two popular Thessaloniki bars, “Room with a View” and “Green Room”.

The Thessaloniki Cinema Museum is located at Warehouse 1 at the Thessaloniki port. The museum mission is to collect, preserve and promote national film history. The Film Library is housed at the museum premises.

Warehouse C at the Thessaloniki port has been assigned to the Thessaloniki Film Festival since 2019. It serves as the Thessaloniki International Film Festival and the Thessaloniki Documentary Festival hub.

The Institution also runs “John Cassavetes” and “Stavros Tornes” theaters at the Thessaloniki port.
