= Angelos Mavropoulos =

Greek actor

Angelos Mavropoulos Άγγελος Μαυρόπουλος
- Born: 1901; Asia Minor (now Turkey)
- Died: 5 March 1979 (77-78 years); Athens, Greece
- Occupation: actor
- Spouse: Marika Krevata

Angelos Mavropoulos (Greek: Άγγελος Μαυρόπουλος, 1901 in Asia Minor (now Turkey) – 5 March 1979 in Athens, Greece) was a Greek actor. He performed in both theatre and film.

== Filmography ==
Year	Film	Transliteration and translation	Role
1959	Enas vlakas kai misos	Ένας βλάκας και μισός	a judge
1960	Christina	Χριστίνα	Christopoulos
1961	O Klearchos, i Marina kai o kontos	Ο Κλέαρχος, η Μαρίνα και ο κοντός	Askariadis
1961	O Katiforos	Ο κατήφορος	judge
1961	Get Out You Thieves	Έξω οι κλέφτες	Mavrogenis
1961	Ziteitai pseftis	Ζητείται ψεύτης	Maratos
1961	O ilingos	Ο ίλιγγος	Panagiotis Panagiotopoulos
1964	O hartopehtria	Η χαρτοπαίχτρα The Card Player	general
1965	A Great Romance	Ένας μεγάλος έρωτας Enas megalos erotas	Mantas
1964	Egoismos	Εγωισμός	Alekos
1964	To doloma	Το δόλωμα	a police officer
1965	I zoi mou anikei se sena	Η ζωή μου ανήκει σε σένα	
1965	A Stupid, Stupid Family	Μια τρελλή, τρελλή οικογένεια Mia trelli, trelli oikogeneia	an officer
1965	Girls for Kisses	Κορίτσια για φίλημα Koritsis gia filima	a judge president
1965	Istoria mias zois	Ιστορία μιας ζωής	Papadopoulos
1965	The Thief is Calling	Φωνάζει ο κλέφτης Fonazei o kleftis	Nikos Chrysanthakopoulos
1966	The Naked Prince	Ο ξυπόλυτος πρίγκηψ O xypolytos prigkipas	police chief
1966	A Conversation in the Air	Ραντεβού στον αέρα Rendez-vous ston aera	Nikolaou
1967	Sapila kai Aristokratia	Σαπίλα και Αριστοκρατία	Kalakos
1967	Kati kourasmena pallikaria	Κάτι κουρασμένα παλικάρια	Stamatiou
1967	Dimitri mou, Dimitri mou	Δημήτρη μου, Δημήτρη μου	Klerarhos Antoniou
1967	Afti pou de lygise	Αυτή που δε λύγισε	doctor
1968	Poly arga gia dakrya	Πολύ αργά για δάκρυα	Markeas
1968	To parelthon mias gynaikas	Το παρελθόν μιας γυναίκας	doctor
1969	Love Forever	Αγάπη για πάντα Agapi gia panta	
1970	Na 'tane to 13 na 'pefte se mas	Να 'τανε το 13 να 'πεφτε σε μας	OPAP president
1960	Krima to boi sou	Κρίμα το μπόι σου	prison director
1972	Alice the Dictator	Η Αλίκη δικτάτωρ I Aliki diktator	an officer
