= Kostas Voutsas =

Greek actor and director (1931–2020)

- Κώστας Βουτσάς
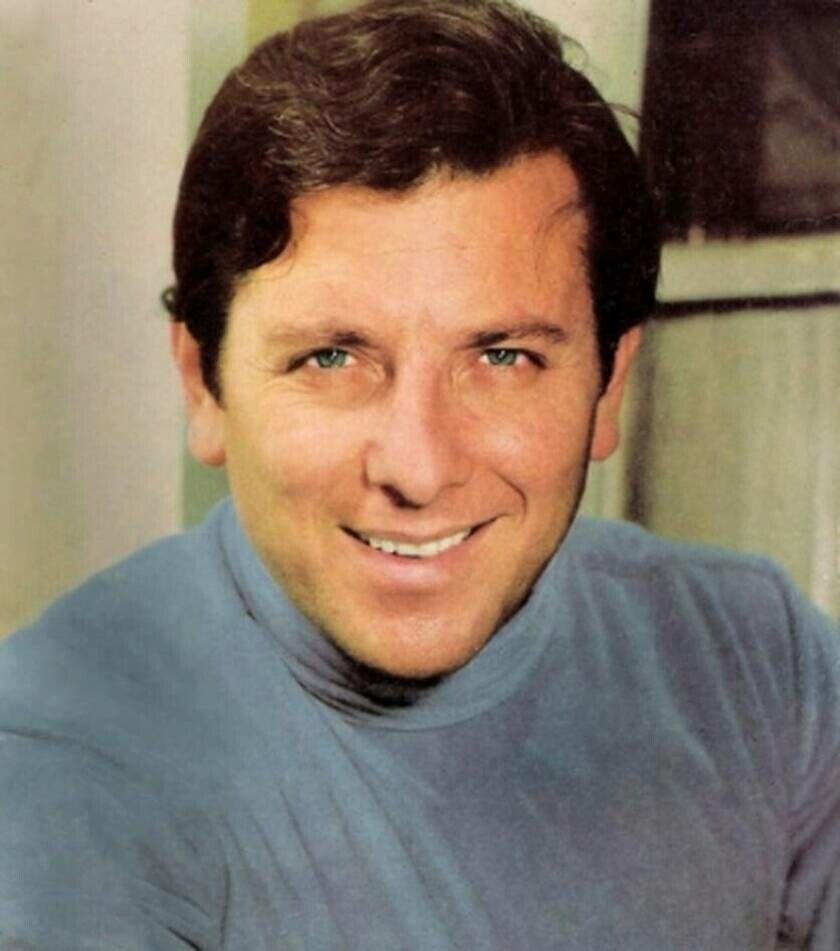
- Born: Konstantinos Savvopoulos; 31 December 1931; Vyronas, Greece
- Died: 26 February 2020 (aged 88); Haidari, Greece
- Resting place: First Cemetery of Athens
- Citizenship: Greece
- Occupations: Actor; director; comedian; screenwriter
- Years active: 1953–2020
- Employer: Finos Film
- Spouses: Erika Broyer (m. 1965; div. 1967) Theano Papaspyrou (m. 1975; div. 1988) Evi Karagiani (m. 1993; div. 2008) Aliki Katsavou (m. 2016)
- Partner: Sperantza Vrana (1959–1963)
- Children: 4
- Relatives: Anthimos Ananiadis (stepson)

Kostas Voutsas (Greek: Κώστας Βουτσάς; born Konstantinos Savvopoulos, Greek: Κωνσταντίνος Σαββόπουλος; 31 December 1931 – 26 February 2020) was a Greek actor, director, and screenwriter of cinema, theatre, and television.

== Biography ==
Voutsas was born in Vyronas, on 31 December 1931 to a refugee family from Epivates, and moved to Thessaloniki in 1932. He studied drama at the Drama School of the Macedonian Conservatory of Thessaloniki and made his stage and screen debut in 1953. His breakthrough came in 1961, when Giannis Dalianidis gave him a key part in his phenomenally successful youth melodrama Ο Κατήφορος (1961).

He soon became one of the best and most popular comic actors of his generation and created personal groups, starring in many Greek comedies by top play-writers and classics like Aristophanes' "Sfikes" (as Philokleon), Molière's "Le bourgeois gentilhomme" (title role) etc. He also starred in about 60 movies, mostly comedies and musicals of the 'golden era' of Greek commercial cinema and received a Lifetime Achievement Award at the Thessaloniki Film Festival in 1984.

Voutsas had three daughters and a son: Alexandra (Sandra) Voutsa from his marriage with Erika Broyer; Theodora Voutsa and Nikoleta Voutsa from his marriage to Theano Papaspirou; and Fivos Voutsas from his fourth and last marriage in 2016, with Aliki Katsavou. He did not have any children with his 3rd wife Evi Karagianni, but was a stepfather to her son Anthemos Ananiades.

Voutsas died of a lung infection on 26 February 2020 at an Athens hospital, aged 88.

== Filmography ==
=== Cine movies ===
Year	Movie title	Original Greek title	Role	Ref(s)
1953	Dad is being trained	Ο μπαμπάς εκπαιδεύεται		
1958	Our Lady the Midwife †	Η κυρά μας η μαμή	Sotiris	
1959	For the love of the shepherdess	Για την αγάπη της βοσκοπούλας	Lampros	
1960	The boy I love †	Το αγόρι που αγαπώ	Petros	
1961	The Tough Guy †	Ο σκληρός άνδρας	Patatas (Policeman)	
1961	The Downfall †	Ο Κατήφορος	Charalampos Gizas - Bisbiras	
1961	Alice in the Navy †	Η Αλίκη στο ναυτικό	Cadet	
1962	Women need spanking	Οι γυναίκες θέλουν ξύλο	Euthemios	
1962	Theodore and the Double-Barrel Shotgun †	Ο Θόδωρος και το δίκαννο	Michael	
1962	Law 4000 †	Νόμος 4000	Renos Karanikas	
1962	Some Like It Cool †	Μερικοί το προτιμούν κρύο	Kleopas	
1962	Athens by night †	Η Αθήνα τη νύχτα	Himself	
1962	Astronauts	Αστροναύτες	Polykarpos	
1963	My friend Lefterakis	Ο φίλος μου ο Λευτεράκης	Lefteris Tsambardis / Bambis Davos	
1963	The Liar Girl	Η ψεύτρα	Philippas	
1963	Honest person wanted	Ζητείται τίμιος	Pantelis	
1963	A Girl for Two †	Ένα κορίτσι για δύο	Aris - Aristeidis	
1963	We the paupers	Εμείς τα μπατιράκια	Pausanias	
1964	What the People Want	Ό,τι θέλει ο Λαός	Mistoklis	
1964	Something that burns	Κάτι να καίει	Klearhos	
1964	The Heirs †	Οι κληρονόμοι	Sotiris Mihaloudis	
1964	The Gambler Lady	Η χαρτοπαίχτρα	Lakis Oikonomidis	
1965	The person of the day	Το πρόσωπο της ημέρας	Grigoris Mavrofrydis	
1965	Teddy Boy my love	Τέντυ μπόι αγάπη μου	Aris Matsakoulis	
1965	No Mr Johnson	Όχι, κύριε Τζόνσον		
1965	Kiss the Girls † / Girls in Kisses ‡	Κορίτσια για φίλημα	Kostas Kaliakoudas	
1965	A Cunning Dude †	Ένα έξυπνο, έξυπνο μούτρο	Machos - Telemachos	
1966	Barefoot Prince	Ξυπόλητος πρίγκηψ	Kostas Sotiriadis	
1966	Rendez-vous in the Air †	Ραντεβού στον αέρα	Kostas Paparigas	
1967	The Blue Beads from Greece †	Οι θαλασσιές οι χάντρες	Kostas Pitouras	
1967	Wedding Night †	Νύχτα γάμου	Iakovos Iordanidis	
1967	Groom from London	Γαμπρός απ' το Λονδίνο	Kostas Papadopoulos / Jack Taylor	
1968	The most brilliant bouzouki	Το πιο λαμπρό μπουζούκι	Fanouris Brokolas / Giorgos Kartalis	
1968	The Liar Guy	Ο ψεύτης	Kostas and Petros Tranos, a fake doctor of merchant navy	
1968	A lady in bouzouki-bars	Μια κυρία στα μπουζούκια	Kostas Masouros	
1968	For whom the bell tolls	Για ποιον χτυπά η κουδούνα	Kostas	
1969	The Victim †	Το θύμα	Michael Koutsopetalos	
1969	The Parisian †	Η παριζιάνα	Man in hotel	
1969	A broke Onassis	Ένας άφραγκος Ωνάσης	Agisilaos Onassis	
1969	The Charmer	Ο γόης	Bambis Christogiannakopoulopoulos	
1969	The Man of Flap	Ο άνθρωπος της καρπαζιάς	Anestis Fakas	
1969	The little man	Το ανθρωπάκι	Euthimios Kopeoglou	
1970	I ridiculed Hitler	Εγώ ρεζίλεψα τον Χίτλερ	Grigoris Tsavos and Lieutenant Von Ruben	
1970	The little teacher was a neat guy	Ο δασκαλάκος ήταν λεβεντιά	Eulambios Mandekas	
1971	I Loved an Armchair †	Αγάπησα μια πολυθρόνα	Grigoris Karouzos	
1971	Devil, Begone	Πίσω μου σ' έχω σατανά	Cameo	
1971	Volunteer at loving	Εθελοντής στον έρωτα	Thomas Raizis	
1972	The Antifascist	Ο αντιφασίστας	Nicola Manzolini	
1972	Seven Years of Marriage †	Επτά χρόνια γάμου	Alekos Fotiou	
1972	Granny, My Love †	Αγάπη μου παλιόγρια	Loukas	
1973	The Optimist †	Ο αισιόδοξος	Christos Antypas	
1973	Twenty Women and I †	Είκοσι γυναίκες κι εγώ	Kostas Philippou	
1973	The African Butler	Τον αράπη κι αν τον πλένεις	Antonis Pikramenos	
1973	A crazy, crazy hijacker	Ένας τρελός, τρελός αεροπειρατής	Stefanos Drakakis	
1975	The terrorist	Ο τρομοκράτης	Kostas Papakostas	
1975	A tank in my bed	Ένα τανκ στο κρεββάτι μου	Kostas Papadimas	
1979	Jack the Rider	Τζακ ο καβαλάρης	Jack	
1980	Kotsos in E.E.C.	Ο Κώτσος στην Ε.Ο.Κ.	Kotsos Boutrounas	
1980	Kotsos and the Aliens	Ο Κώτσος και οι εξωγήινοι	Kostas Kontopoulos - Cronium	
1981	The Last Male †	Ο τελευταίος άντρας	Kosmas Prinos	
1981	Kotsos out of the N.A.T.O.	Ο Κώτσος έξω από το Ν.Α.Τ.Ο.	Kostas (Kotsos)	
1982	Change and mother's leash	Αλλαγή και το λουρί της μάνας	Michael Paparounas, Stavros, Archimandrite Dorotheos, Mrs Domena	
1983	Sheriff the mechanovore	Σερίφης ο μηχανοφάγος	Grigoris	
1983	The democracy of smog	Η δημοκρατία του νέφους		
1984	The Love of Ulysses †	Ο έρωτας του Οδυσσέα	Ulysses	
1985	The bricks	Τα τούβλα	Kostas / Kotsos / Binas	
1986	The Pontians	Οι Πόντιοι	Kostikas Panaidis	
1986	The Doctor is sharp as a tack	Είναι γάτα ο Γιατρός	Tasos Hatzikostas	
1986	I Loved a Pontian †	Αγάπησα έναν Πόντιο	Kostikas Panaidis	
1986	The Knight of the Pothole	Ο Ιππότης της λακκούβας	Michael Anoihtomatis	
1987	Bigamous	Ο δίγαμος	Andreas Drakopoulos	
1987	120 Decibels †	120 ντεσιμπέλ		
1987	Multiethnic Groom	Πολυεθνικός γαμπρός	Odyseas Ithakisios	
1989	Flu, My Love	Γρίπη Αγάπη μου	Gerasimos	
1990	Groom by force	Γαμπρός με το ζόρι	Charis Prinzas	
1990	The Red Daisy †	Η κόκκινη Μαργαρίτα	Alekos	
1996	Towards Freedom	Προς την ελευθερία		
1999	Every Saturday †	Κάθε Σάββατο	Thanasis Pallas	
2002	Merry Go Round †	Γύρω-γύρω όλοι		
2007	Female Conspiracies †	Γυναικείες συνωμοσίες	Giorgos	
2008	Bank bang †	Bank bang	Ermolaos Economou	
2008	Charlie's Son †	Ο γιός του Τσάρλυ	Big John	
2009	The Island	Η Νήσος	Apostolis	
2009	The Building Manager †	Ο διαχειριστής	Mr Isidoros	
2010	Wheel, bag and getaway 5	Ρόδα, τσάντα και κοπάνα 5	Pit Paras	
2011	The Island 2	Η Νήσος 2	Apostolis	
2011	The Pontians: New Generation	Πόντιοι νέαν γενεάν	Kostikas Panaidis	
2012	Larissa Confidential †	Λάρισα εμπιστευτικό		
2013	Uncovered	Ακάλυπτος	Sultan	
2014	Thursday the 12th †	Πέμπτη & 12		
2017	Smyrna, My Beloved	Σμύρνη μου αγαπημένη		
2018	Magic Leather †	Μαγικό Δέρμα		
2023	The Greek Job †			
† International: English title ‡ USA: TV title

=== Television ===
Year(s)	TV title	Original Greek title	Channel	Role	Remark(s)	Ref(s)
1973	Variety	Βαριετέ	YENED			
1973-1975	The Dreamer	Ο ονειροπαρμένος	YENED	Kostakis Voutsas †		
1975-1976	Our Man	Ο άνθρωπός μας	YENED	Kostas †		
1979-1980	The Diary of a Doorkeeper	Το ημερολόγιο ενός θυρωρού	YENED	Vangelis Garidas †		
1980	The Grand Parade	Η μεγάλη παρέλαση	ERT			
1985-1986	Androklis and his Lions	Ο Ανδροκλής και τα λιοντάρια του	ERT2	Androklis Karperos †		
1986	The Love of Ulysses	Ο έρωτας του Οδυσσέα	ERT1	Ulysses †		
1987	Cruise to Paradise	Κρουαζιέρα στον παράδεισο	ERT1			
1989	A Ride to the Moon	Μια βόλτα στο φεγγάρι	ET2	Kostas †		
1990	Stories Without Tears	Ιστορίες χωρίς δάκρυα	ANT1			
1991-1992	Dad and Buddy	Μπαμπάς και φιλαράκος	ANT1	Polykarpos †		
1993-1994	The Glamorous	Οι χλιδάτοι	ET1	Patriarch †		
1993-1994	A Wonderful Life	Μια υπέροχη ζωή	MEGA	Tortelinis †		
1998	Whatever you say, Minister	Ότι πείτε υπουργέ μου		Richard Willow	TV movie	
2000-2001	For a place in the sun	Για μια θέση στον ήλιο	MEGA		30 episodes	
2001-2002	The Voice	Η Φωνή	ET1	†		
2003-2004	Parental Sins	Αμαρτίες Γονέων	MEGA	Paris Koulianos †		
2004	Everything on the Terrace	Όλα στην Ταράτσα	ALPHA	Santa Claus	1 episode	
2006	The Red Room	Το Κόκκινο Δωμάτιο	MEGA	Evangelos Krokan	1 episode	
2006-2007	Blindfold	Τυφλόμυγα	ALPHA	Mentis †		
2007	Youngerman	Γιούγκερμαν	ANT1	Stratis Sklavoyannis	Episode #1.6	
2007	TV Tiglon ‡	TV Tiglon	ALPHA	Himself	Episode #1.32	
2008	Wild Children	Άγρια παιδιά	MEGA/ALPHA		1 episode	
2008	Baby Dance ‡	Baby Dance		Himself	Episode #1.8	
2008	Nou Dou Fun Park	Νου Δου Fun Park			TV movie	
2009	Seven Deadly Mothers-in-law	Επτά Θανάσιμες Πεθερές	MEGA	Aristos	1 episode	
2009	Working Woman	Εργαζόμενη Γυναίκα	ANT1	Kostas Triantafillou	1 episode	
2010	The Apartment Building	Η Πολυκατοικία	MEGA	Kostas Papakaramitros	2 episodes	
2010-2011	Towards Freedom	Προς την ελευθερία	ET1	†		
2011-2012	White Balloons	Άσπρα Μπαλόνια	SIGMA	†		
2012-2014	With Pants Down	Με τα παντελόνια κάτω	MEGA	Kostas Halkias †		
2017	Your Kin	Το σόι σου	ALPHA	Marios	Season 4, episode 3	
2018	Ten Little Mitsi	Δέκα Μικροί Μήτσοι	ANT1		4 episodes	
† Leading role ‡ TV show

=== Videos ===
Year(s)	Title	Original Greek title	Channel	Role	Remarks	Ref(s)
1986	I attract and I circulate	Αρέσω και κυκλοφορώ		Babis	Alternative title: Both money and pennies (Και λεφτάς και αδέκαρος)	
1987	Wind-Up Lover	Ο κουρδιστός εραστής		Kostas		
1988	My sweet Koutsi, from Chalkoutsi	Γλυκειά μου Κουτσή, από το Χαλκούτσι		Kostas	Reissued as My sweet Koutsi (Γλυκειά μου κουτσή	
1988	Life begins at forty	Η ζωή αρχίζει στα σαράντα				
1988	Summertime Lover	Καλοκαιρινός εραστής		Kostas		
1988	The man of the year	Ο άντρας της χρονιάς		Akis		
1988	I love student desks	I love θρανίο		Schoolmaster		
1989	A thorn in my wreath	Ένα αγκάθι στο θρανίο μου		Dimitris		
1989	The amorous cat	Ο ερωτιάρης γάτος		Kostas		

=== Dubbing ===
Year(s)	Title	Role	Remarks	Ref(s)
2009	Up	Carl Fredricksen	Greek dubbing	

=== Director ===
Year(s)	Title	Original Greek title	Remarks	Ref(s)
1975	Our Man	Ο άνθρωπός μας	TV series on YENED	
1982	Change and mother's leash	Αλλαγή και το λουρί της μάνας	TV title: A Thief in Paradise (Ένας κλέφτης στον Παράδεισο)	
2008	Nou Dou Fun Park	Νου Δου Fun Park	TV movie	

=== Writer ===
Year(s)	Title	Original Greek title	Remarks	Ref(s)
1985	The bricks	Τα τούβλα	Idea	
1990	Groom by force	Γαμπρός με το ζόρι	Video	
1991	Stories Without Tears	Ιστορίες χωρίς δάκρυα	TV series on ANT1	

== Honours and awards ==
In 1984, he received a Lifetime Achievement Award at the Thessaloniki Film Festival.

== See also ==
- List of oldest fathers
