= Finos Film =

Greek film production company

- Type: Film Production
- Industry: Film
- Founded: 1943
- Defunct: 1977 to 2006
- Headquarters: Athens, Greece
- Key people: Philopemen Finos
- Products: Motion pictures
- Website: www.finosfilm.gr

Finos Film (Greek: Φίνος Φιλμ) is a Greek film production and distribution company that dominated the Greek film industry from 1943 to 1977. It was founded by Filopimin Finos in 1942 during World War II. It was the biggest film production company in Greece at the time and one of the biggest, in terms of productivity, in southeast Europe. After 34 years, Finos Films returned to the Greek film scene with the Greek-Italian co-production 'Urania' (2006). Additionally, the company re-releases its old movies on DVD completely remastered and in Dolby digital 2.0 sound on a monthly basis.

== History ==
In 1954 Finos moved his company's headquarters for the last time to the old soap factory building of Papoutsanis at 53 Chios Street, near the Larisis station. In the neoclassical building of Chios Street, the workshops are developed, from the appearance to the final copy (displays, editing, mixing, etc.), the offices and the production planning of the company. At the same time, Finos is looking for bigger sets since the needs of the production are constantly increasing. The ATLANTIS site, as it was named because it was next to the old ATLANTIS cement factory, in the Thymarakia area of Liosion Street, no longer meets the needs of the company.

In 1958, the company's new platforms began operating in Agios Anargyros, in the Mykoniatika region. It was the old stables of Ioannis Merla. Their reconstruction took more than two years. There were two sets, one big and one small, as well as a warehouse, a carpentry shop, dressing rooms and a large enclosure that served the possibility of building a city set, as it happens in the movie Lola, where the whole Trumpet has been built in the enclosure of the sets. The studios were close to the urban fabric and at the same time isolated. Most of the films of the company's golden period were shot on the sets of Aghii Anargyri. When there were many films and the grouping did not work out, they also used the Anzervos studio in Filothei, which was demolished before 2004 and was one of the first studios in the country, financed with a loan from the National Bank.

All this happened until 1970, when the new studios of the company were inaugurated in Spata, which were a big dream of Finos, who according to his colleagues wanted to make a Greek Tsinetsita. As part of this vision Finos sent an architect and associates to Cinecita in Rome to get information about the construction of the platforms - one can discern architectural similarities with the Cinecita platforms. The new studios consisted of two large stages and all the necessary spaces of a corresponding band. In the 1970s it was considered one of the best sets in Europe and for the moment it seemed that it would offer even more rapid growth to domestic film production.

But then, from 1972-1973 onwards, social and economic reasons of the time, with the dominant cause being the development of television, as well as Fino's inability to create business partnerships and operate in the spirit of the new era caused a great crisis in Greek cinema, by which Finos Film was seriously hit. After the death of its founder in 1977, the company was mainly concerned with renting out its films and operating the sets in order to pay off the huge debts. The studios of Finos Film in Spata are still today among the largest sets in the country and the only cinematic architectural example (together with Studio Alfa in Melissia) of a company that operated in the model of centralization of film production, just like the big American and European studios from the 1930s to the early 1960s.

== Films ==
Below is a partial list of films listed here:

=== Tickets – first place ===
- 1949-50: O methystakas - 304,438 tickets (1st of 7)
- 1952-53: The Taxi Driver - 190,589 tickets (1st of 22)
- 1956-57: To amaxaki - 138,620 tickets (1st of 30)
- 1956-57: I theia ap' to Chicago - 142,459 tickets (1st of 28)
- 1958-59: Astero - 139,501 tickets (1st of 45)
- 1960-61: Alice in the Navy (Η Αλίκη στο ναυτικό, I Aliki sto naftiko) - 213,408 tickets (1st of 58)
- 1961-62: Downhill (Κατήφορος, Katiforos) - 161,331 tickets (1st of 68)
- 1963: Love in the Classroom
- 1969-70: The Teacher With Blonde Hair (Η δασκάλα με τα ξανθά μαλλιά, I daskala me ta xantha mallia) - 739,001 tickets (1st of 90)
- 1970-71: Ipolochagos Natassa 751,117 tickets (1st of 87)
