= Miranda Myrat =

Greek actress (1906–1994)

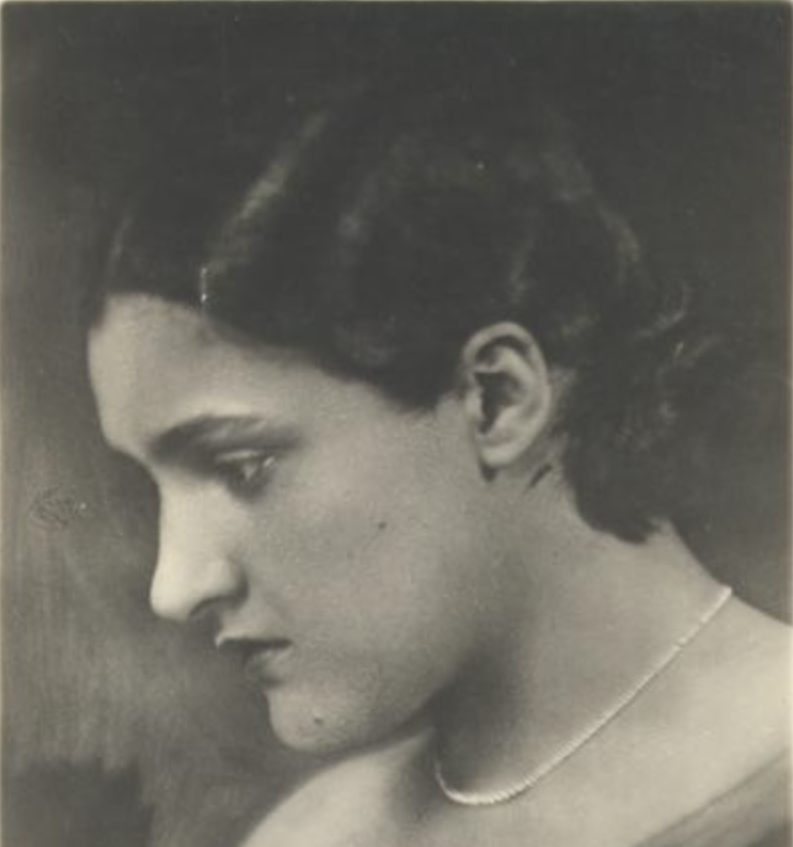
- Miranda Myrat
- Born: 12 January 1906; Athens, Greece
- Died: 27 January 1994 (aged 88)
- Occupation: Actress
- Years active: 1928–1989
- Children: Kyveli Theohari
- Parent(s): Cybele Andrianou; Mitsos Myrat
- Relatives: Georgios Papandreou (step-father); Andreas Papandreou (step-brother)

Miranda Myrat (Greek: Μιράντα Μυράτ; 12 January 1906 – 27 January 1994) was a Greek silent film actress, film actress, theater actress and radio performer. She was a member of the prominent acting family known as the Myrat family. Some actors included: Mitsos Myrat, Chrysoula Kotopouli-Myrat, Dimitris Myrat, and Kyveli Myrat. Her mother was famous Greek actress Cybele Andrianou and was known as Kyveli. Her mother left when she was one year old, but continued to have a relationship with her daughter throughout her life. Miranda was part of her theater troupe for over ten years. Her mother, Cybele, eventually married the future Prime Minister of Greece Georgios Papandreou. Miranda's stepbrother was the Greek Prime Minister Andreas Papandreou. Miranda appeared in more than fifty-two films from 1928 to 1989.

Miranda was born in Athens, Greece, to Greek actors Mitsos Myrat and Cybele Andrianou. She joined her father's theater troupe when she was 13 and eventually studied in Paris at the Collège Sévigné from 1921 to 1923. When she returned from Paris, France, at the age of seventeen, she joined her mother Cybele's theater troupe from 1923-1932. Miranda also appeared in the Greek silent film Love and Waves in 1928. She eventually started several of her own theater troupes while also appearing in ten films between 1928-1960. By 1960, the actress appeared in over 40 films. During her life, she was also a Greek radio presenter, reading poems and short stories on live radio.

== Biography ==
Miranda Myrat was born to Mitsos Myrat and Cybele Andrianou on January 12, 1906, in Athens, Greece. Both of her parents were theater actors from Smyrna. Smyrna was home to the second-largest Greek theater after Constantinople in the Ottoman Empire. Her mother, Cybele, fell in love with a wealthy young man named Kostas Theodoridis the same year Miranda was born. The young star abandoned her husband and children, Miranda, and Alekos, and fled to Paris, France, where she remained for ten months, giving birth to actress Aliki Theodoridi-Nor. Her mother eventually divorced Kostas and married the future Prime Minister of Greece Georgios Papandreou, who was Cybele's third and final husband. Miranda's half-brother from the marriage, Georgios G. Papandreou (1928-2020) became a Greek politician. Miranda and Georgios' stepbrother from Georgios' first marriage was the future Greek Prime Minister Andreas Papandreou. Her father, Mitsos Myrat, married Greek actress Chrysoula Kotopouli Myrat in 1908. Miranda's stepbrother from the marriage, Dimitris Myrat, was also an actor. There was a fierce theater rivalry between Cybele and Chrysoula's sister actress, Marika Kotopouli.

Miranda began her theatrical career at the age of 13. She became part of the theatrical troupe of her father Mitsos Myrat and aunt Marika Kotopouli. In 1919, she appeared on stage performing in Paul Lindau's play The Two Leonores (Die beiden Leonoren). The following year, she performed in an operetta based on Wilhelm Meyer-Förster's German play The Student Prince (Alt Heidelberg). Miranda eventually attended the Collège Sévigné in Paris, France, from 1921 to 1923. In 1923, she was back in Greece performing with her mother Cybele and her theater troupe along with her step-sister Aliki Theodoridi-Nor. Miranda starred in the 1928 Greek silent film Love and Waves. That same year, her mother married the future Prime Minister of Greece, Georgios Papandreou. By 1930, the Royal Theatre was eventually replaced by the National Theatre of Greece. It was founded by Miranda's stepfather, Georgios Papandreou, who was Minister of Education at the time. Miranda continued to perform with her mother's troupe until 1932 because she became part of the National Theatre of Greece. At the National Theatre, she was a leading actress and professor of Drama. Some actors Miranda taught included: Sotiris Moustakas, Giorgos Marinos, Kostas Karras, and Grigoris Valtinos. In 1933, Miranda appeared in the Greek films Miss Lawyer and The Wrong Road. Τhat same year, she also appeared in Gregorios Xenopoulos' stage play The Popular (Ο Ποπολάρος) on May 14, 1933, at the Greek National Theater.

Between 1939 and 1940, Miranda reunited with her stepmother, Chrysoula Kotopouli Myrat's sister Marika Kotopouli, collaborating with her troupe. Miranda founded her own troupe in 1940, collaborating with Kostas Mousouris, Mavrea, and Orestis Makris. The following year, the troupe was dissolved and another troupe was formed, entitled Miranda and George Pappas troupe performing until the summer of 1942 when Miranda started a new troupe which featured Mary Aroni. Miranda appeared in the Greek films Forgotten Faces in 1946 and The Last Mission in 1949. In the 1950s, she appeared in three more films, and by the 1960s, she appeared in over 40 films. The 60s were a period during which Miranda stopped her theatrical career. In the early 1970s, she appeared in two movies. Miranda frequently collaborated with the Greek National Radio Foundation and was considered an expert in reciting poems and reading literary texts on the radio. Miranda was married twice. Her first husband was Spyros Theocharis, with whom she had two daughters, actress Kyveli Theochari and dancer Vana Theochari. Her second husband was Lefteris Apostolou.

== Theatrical performances ==
Season	Performance	Role	Theater Troupe	Theater	Director
Greek Theatrical Period 1932-1933	The Popular (Ο Ποπολάρος)	Countess Elda	National Theatre of Greece	Ziller Building Roadshow	Fotos Politis
Greek Theatrical Period 1933-1934	The Would-Be Noble (Ο Αρχοντοχωριάτης)	Dorimani	National Theatre of Greece	Ziller Building	Fotos Politis
Greek Theatrical Period 1933-1934	Lord Byron (Λόρδος Βύρων)	Fornarina	National Theatre of Greece	Ziller Building	Fotos Politis
Greek Theatrical Period 1939-1940	Love's Steering Wheel (Τιμόνι Στον Έρωτα)	Grace	Imikratikos Thiasos Kotopouli	Rex Theatre; Theatro Alikis	Karolos Koun

== Selected filmography ==
Year	Greek Title	English Title	Role	Notes
1928	Έρως και Κύματα	Love and Waves	Rina	Silent Film
1933	Δεσποινίς Δικηγόρος	Miss Lawyer		
1933	Ο Κακός Δρόμος	The Wrong Road	Christina	
1946	Πρόσωπα Λησμονημένα	Forgotten Faces	Mary	
1949	Τελευταία Αποστολή	The Last Mission	Anna Mareli	
1956	Δολάρια και Όνειρα	Dollars and Dreams	Miranda	
1959	Μπουμπουλίνα	Bouboulina	Skevo Pinotsi	
1968	Κορίτσια στον Ήλιο	Girls in the Sun	Mrs. Fragopoulou	

== Bibliography ==
- Writers, Staff (1959). Who's Who In Greece 1958-1959 (in Greek). Athens, Greece: Athens News.
