= Fotos Politis =

Greek theatre director

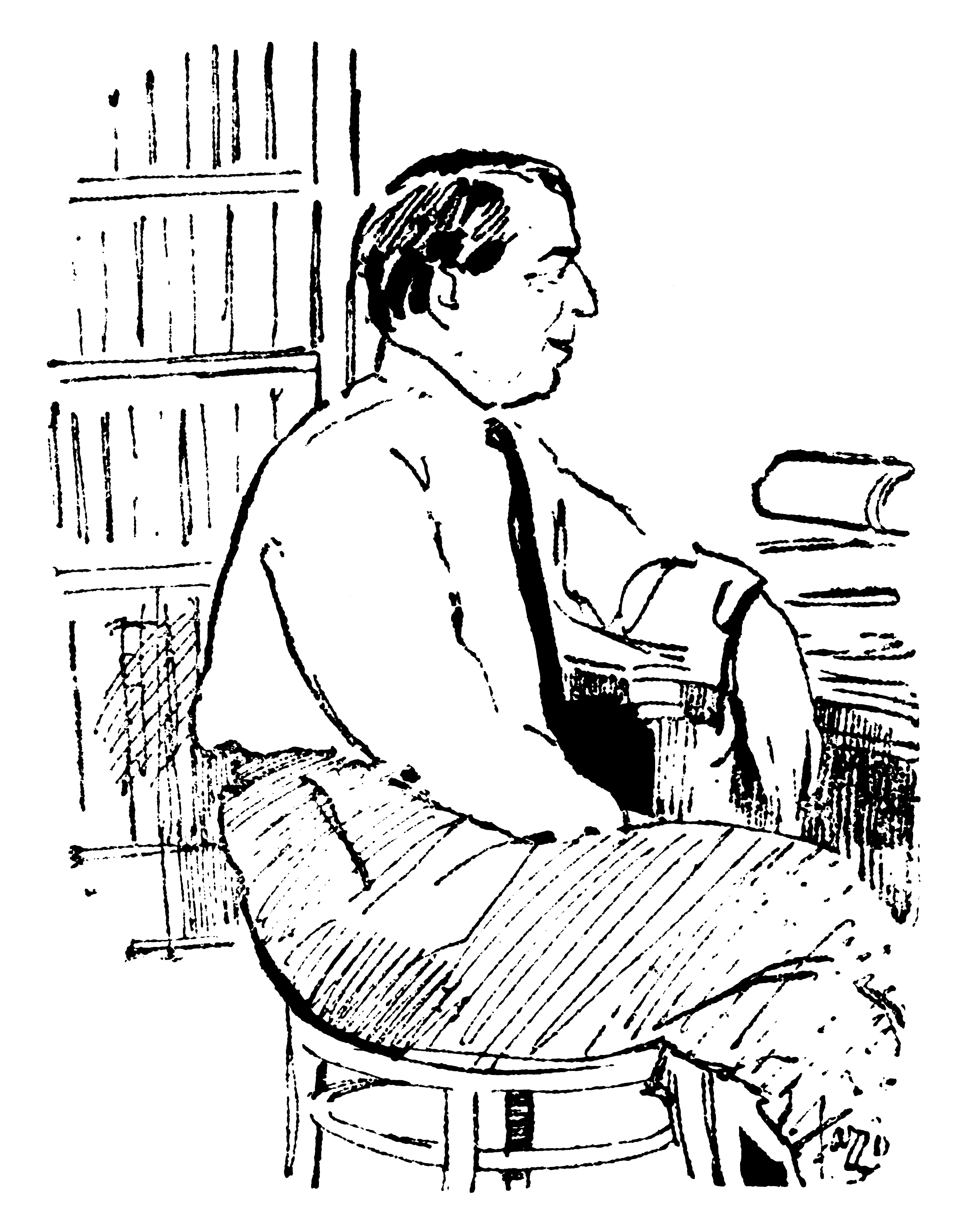
- Born: 1890; Athens, Greece
- Died: 1934 (aged 43–44); Athens, Greece
- Occupations: Stage director, reviewer, playwright and translator
- Father: Nikolaos Politis

Fotos Politis (Greek: Φώτος Πολίτης; 1890–1934) was a Greek stage director.

He was one of the most prominent figures in the revival of the ancient Greek tragedies in the 20th century. A literary and theater reviewer and playwright, who was responsible for the creation of what came to be called "the theatrical tradition of the National Theater of Greece", he developed original teaching methods for aspiring young actors in Athenian drama schools while the rehearsals for the plays that he staged were known for their long duration and exhaustive intensity. Politis felt an obligation to educate not only the actors, corrupted by the French "Théâtre de boulevard" of the time, but also the general public by bringing it in contact with the masterpieces of ancient Greek tragedy, Shakespeare, classical European theater and avant-garde theater.

== Early years ==
Born in Athens in an academic environment, Politis was the son of Nicolaos Politis, a professor at the University of Athens, who was considered the father of Greek folklore studies and cultural traditions, while his younger brother, Linos Politis, also a professor, taught modern Greek literature. In 1906–1908 he attended classes at the Athens Odeum's (conservatoire) drama school and received the second prize in a drama competition with his play The Vampire.

At the end of 1908, he left for four years to study law in Germany. During this time and parallel with his law studies, he took courses in philosophy, being deeply influenced by German idealism. He was also influenced by the ideas of the Austrian-Jewish director Max Reinhardt, who staged ancient Greek tragedies, which Politis followed closely, as well as most of the new ideas that disseminated from the Max Reinhardt Seminar in Vienna, the most important German-language acting school. It was the time when the role of the director began to become as prevalent as that of the playwright and the protagonist.

In early 1913, Politis was drafted, because of the Balkan Wars and had to return to Greece to enlist.

== Reviewer and critic in the 20s and 30s ==
After returning from the front, he begins his first reviews with a byline in January 1915, in the daily Nea Hellas (New Greece), which was supporting Prime Minister Eleftherios Venizelos. Until his early death in 1934, he wrote 1103 reviews in various newspapers, like Politeia (The State), Eleftheron Vema (Free Tribune) and Proia (Morning).

Apart from his columns in the daily press, he collaborated from 1927 with Costis Bastias' newly published literary review Ellinika Grammata (Hellenic Letters). There he joined the closely knit ideological circle of the magazine, consisting of Costis Bastias (publisher), Yannis Apostolakis, Politis' older first cousin, mentor and later professor of literature at the University of Thessaloniki, Alexandros Delmouzos, prominent educator and proponent for the instruction of demotic Greek in the school system, K. Th. Demaras, Greece's foremost scholar on the Greek Enlightenment and later professor of Modern Greek Studies at the French university Paris I – Sorbonne Panthéon, and George N. Politis, Politis' elder brother and the magazine's top book reviewer. The circle supported the "demotic" (vernacular) language, Greek cultural traditions, German idealism, closely linked to the Enlightenment and was critical of rampant nationalism and communism.

== Stage director, theatrical educator, translator ==
In 1918, Politis participated in the founding of the "Hellenic Theater Co." by the Society of Greek Playwrights. The playwright Miltiades Lidorikis presided over the new company, with the poet Pavlos Nirvanas, the stage director Spyros Melas and Politis on the board. Politis was further appointed professor with the company's drama school. He soon starts the translation in modern Greek iambic verse of Sophocles' Oedipus Rex and chooses one of Greece's greatest actors, Aimilios Veakis, whose memorable performance as King Lear at the Royal (National) Theater of Greece in 1938 has remained indelibly written in the history of 20th century Greek theater, to appear in the homonymous role. Under the direction of Fotos Politis, Oedipus Rex opened in the old 19th-century neoclassical theater "Olympia" on Academias Street. The performance became a milestone in the revival of ancient tragedy, with the ideas of Max Reinhardt often evident, in the interpretation of the play. Politis was acclaimed as a director, the tickets were sold out, while the prominent reviewer Marios Ploritis wrote of "The first face to face confrontation with the interpretation of ancient drama". The Greek stage director and historian of the theater Mitsos Lygizos observed about the contribution of the "Hellenic Theater Company" that:

It was founded to put a stop to the ridiculous parodies, desecrations and clownery of Sophocles, Shakespeare and Ibsen by various theatrical companies of the time.

In 1925, when the Greek Actors' Union decided to create the "Professional School of Drama", Politis was appointed professor of repertoire and acting and from 1927 he started staging performances. Shakespeare's The Merchant of Venice (1927), Ibsen's John Gabriel Borkman (1928), the 17th century Cretan religious drama Abraham's sacrifice (1929), etc. He also tried his first open air performance of ancient tragedy, Euripides' Hecuba (1927), with Greece's famous actress Marika Kotopouli and her troupe, in the all marble Panathenaic Stadium, build in the 1890s for the first Olympic Games of modern times. The stage director Alexis Solomos described the performance, as the most renowned Hecuba of the interwar period.

== At the National Theater (1930–1934) ==
=== Naming the National Theater (background) ===
There is some confusion as to the actual name of the National or Royal Theater and the various alternating forms this name took, following political changes. At the end of the 19th century, King George I of Greece founded the Royal Theater, with Ernst Ziller as architect, which began its performances in 1900. Its existence was short lived, since it closed in 1908. The property belonged to King George I and the Royal Family and it was rented out to various troupes. The 1922 republican revolution confiscated the building, tore down the royal insignia and continued to rent it. In 1930, by law, the Greek state founded a National Theater, with the intention of erecting a new building, but due to the depression, it was decided to temporarily use the old Royal Theater. When in 1935, the monarchy was reinstated and King George II returned to Greece, the National Theater was renamed Royal Theater, but was now a state owned theater. In fact, the State indemnified Royal Prince Nicholas, uncle of King George II, who had inherited the building. With the beginning of the German occupation in 1941, the theater was renamed National Theater. After the Liberation in 1944, the building itself was named Royal Theater, but the state theater company appearing continued to be officially called National Theater. The only thing to remember is that the National or Royal Theater founded in 1930, had no ideological connection, nor was it a continuation of the old Royal Theater of 1900–1908, but represented an entire new ideology expressed by Fotos Politis. The only thing in common were the walls, and that because of lack of money.

=== The founding of the National Theater ===
When in January 1930, George Papandreou became minister of Education (1930–1932), in the cabinet of prime minister Eleftherios Venizelos (1928–1932), his dream was to found the National Theater of Greece, where the country's two leading actresses, Kyveli, to whom he was married, and Marika Kotopouli, along with leading actor Aimilios Veakis, would participate in collaboration with an important stage director like Spyros Melas. He immediately started working with the poet Ioannis Gryparis, who was Secretary of Letters and Arts in the ministry, since the 1922 revolution of republican officers, that had forced King Constantine I to abdicate. An ardent supporter of a new state National Theater, Gryparis had been in the ministry for the past eight years, but for a short thirteen-month period (June 1925 – July 1926) when he was removed by the Theodore Pangalos dictatorship. Already in 1923, he had told Fotos Politis that he had decided to go ahead with the creation of a National Theater, while in 1924, he gave an interview to Costis Bastias, where he describes with precision all the problems that had to be met for such an undertaking, like the building, financing through a tax on gambling and lotteries, the cast and the administration. Much of the ground work was already prepared and prime minister Eleftherios Venizelos had given his approval. The new law was published on May 5, 1930, and the first immediate appointments were Ioannis Gryparis, as director general, Costis Bastias, as secretary general and Fotos Politis as stage director.

=== Fotos Politis gains control of the Theater ===
After Spyros Melas refused the position of prime stage director and Miltos Lydorikis was hired and resigned, Minister Papandreou accepted to elevate Fotos Politis to the position of prime stage director in the beginning of 1931. From there on, things started moving. The 15 member Board was replaced by a more active seven member body and the executive committee's members were reduced and its decisions became merely advisory. It was renamed as the Artistic Committee. By mid-November 1931, the chairman of the board, theater historian Nicolaos Laskaris, resigned, feeling bypassed by the small, hardcore decision making group of Politis, Gryparis, Bastias and poet Pavlos Nirvanas, a member of the Artistic Committee. Due to his continuous presence in the Athenian press as a journalist and columnist, Bastias replies to most of the attacks in the press against a theater that had yet to be inaugurated. When Petros Pikros, the ex editor-in-chief of the communist daily Rizospastis (The Radical) and managing editor of the Marxist review Protoporoi (The Vanguardists), attacks the theater, Bastias replies with two articles, "The National Theater and Marxist theory", saying:

It seems to be wrong, but we have come to respect the artists and their talent wherever they blossom, either in the hothouses of the rich, or the huts of the poor. We respect them when they are called Goethe or when they are called Gorky. It is sufficient for us that it's present.

In August 1931, just prior to the inauguration of the National Theater, Politis travels to Germany and Austria to be informed and brought up to date with the latest developments in Max Reinhardt's productions. Upon his return he continuous building the foundations of a new theatrical tradition and adding to the Greek theater, after the playwright and the actor, a new third factor —the director. Till then, leading first ladies like Kyveli or Marika Kotopouli ruled their troupes with an iron hand, making all the important decisions. Sometimes, a director would be used, but in a secondary capacity. But, Politis reduced the importance of the protagonists, creating harmonic and disciplined ensembles, far from the hastily prepared and improvised productions, having to train the cast in a new acting method. This demanded exhaustive teaching and rehearsals. Costis Bastias describes for us how demanding Politis was:

During the July and August recess, the actors of the National Theater took part in three rehearsals per day, including Sundays. One in the morning 10 - 1, one in the afternoon 5 - 8, and one at night 10 - 12½. To these nine hours, if we add the time spend at home to study the plays for their better understanding and to memorize their lines, one can realize the labor involved for the director, the actors and the understudies.

=== Politis first stage director of the National Theater ===
On Saturday evening, March 19, 1932, the most important cultural event of the interwar period in Greece took place. The inaugural performance of the newly renovated National Theater with Aeschylus' tragedy Agamemnon and a one-act comedy by Gregorios Xenopoulos was a great success. Every last seat was sold out, as the Athenians flocked to the new theater — the gentlemen in white or black tie and the ladies in long evening gowns.

For the next 32 months, until his premature passing away at daybreak of December 4, 1934, Fotos Politis staged 35 plays by the most prominent playwrights of all time. His repertoire included Aeschylus, Sophocles, Euripides, Shakespeare, Molière, Goldoni, Schiller, de Musset, Ibsen, Zweig, Shaw, O'Neill, as well as modern Greek playwrights like Demetrios Byzantios, Gregorios Xenopoulos, Pantelis Horn, Spyros Melas and Alecos Lydorikis. For Politis, this was his way to uplift an audience by bringing it in contact with the masterpieces of theatrical art from all over the world, from the ancient Greek tragic poets to the contemporary playwrights. Through his stage direction, he assisted his public to approach the essence of every play. The general secretary of the theater, Costis Bastias, who had closely followed Politis' staging methods, observed:

Politis enforced what he called "internal stage direction" to distinguish it from the other one, the "external direction", whose ambition did not surpass a well designed drawing room. [...] But the stage director's work is to translate the work of the poet to the language of the stage. In other words, he finds the way to bring to the surface the play's deeper meaning, to shed light on the characters, and thus to bring the audience closer to the playwright. This is his purpose, and to achieve it everything turns to putty in his hands: the actor, the set designer, the costumes, the musician, the dancer. Everything is used to serve the poet and his creation.

The novelist, playwright and columnist Angelos Terzakis, who played a major role in the development of the National (Royal) Theater since 1937, as general secretary, director of repertoire and director general in succession, remarked concerning Politis' preferences in the repertoire and staging, that he had certain specific beliefs:

He struck a blow without mercy against the french "théâtre de boulevard", that equated the theater stage to a nightclub scene. An implacable blow to a star system that turned theater to a low-level track, where personal narcissistic vanities are satisfied. A blow to the playwrights who come to terms by buying and selling the lower instincts and tastes of the public.

The National Theater received innumerable attacks in the press because of its hostile attitude against the popular Théâtre de boulevard, its views toward the all-mighty leading actors and its repertorial selections, especially the limited number of contemporary Greek plays. In the beginning of October 1932, the Theater inaugurated its new season, its second season, with Shakespeare's The Merchant of Venice. Bastias again wrote about Fotos Politis and the new season:

How much ink and how much paper have been consumed on polemics both to the idea of a National Theater and its Administration. But when last March arrived and the unforgettable performances of Agamemnon, Julius Caesar and others were staged [...] Almost one hundred performances, attended with enthusiasm by most of the capital's populace [...] Those that saw the inspiring staging by Fotos Politis, are in a position to appreciate the efforts and the honesty that are to be found in the work of the National Theater. If one takes notice of the methods employed until now, he will surely agree. The impromptu staging of performances, the lack of a stage director able to conceive the ideological essence of the great works, how quickly each play was staged, seldom allowing the actor to withdraw from his self and to enter his role, to get under the skin of the character that he is impersonating. [...] In other words, instead of the character standing out, it is the actor. This is the result of what the leading actors have established. Against this long standing method, this anti-theatrical system, Fotos Politis is campaigning.

== An epilogue to Fotos Politis' life and contribution ==
Fotos Politis' contribution to the theater and literary criticism was indeed of significant consequence. He introduced a theatrical standard, when he first entered the world of the theater, much more demanding than what was currently in use. He fought against hastily prepared productions that were then prevalent, the miserable repertoire based on the "french boulevard", and the authoritative ways of the leading actors-managers, who in no way wanted to collaborate with the new and upcoming stage directors. He supported the struggle for the Demotic Greek language to prevail, the strict adherence to the texts without unwarranted alterations, the European avant-garde movements in the theater, which he knew quite well, and the stage director's predominance, as the foremost head of the artistic creation, who interprets the playwright, and with his baguette conducts the actors, set designers, costume designers, musicians, choreographers, to bring about the desired result. As University of Athens professor of theatrical studies Katerina Arvaniti has written:

Politis was a prominent director with whom ancient tragedy was recognized as a unique theatrical form. He laid the foundations of the National Theater's tradition.

The establishment of a theatrical tradition is not a simple matter, especially one that has to do with the founding of a venerable institution like Greece's "National Theater". Usually, many decades, if not centuries like the Comèdie Française, are required. Politis' persistence for hundreds of exhaustive rehearsals now becomes evident. The singular teaching of elocution in the manner required by Greek tragedy, the rhythm of the performances, the movement and gestures of the ancient chorus and the performers with detailed sketches by Politis of their every stance, as seen in his prompt books (Regiebuch), was undertaken by Reinhardt in detail. Meticulous directions to the actors for the sounds of the performance (cries, footsteps, banging), combined with music, sought to establish an acoustic whole. The directions to set designer Kleovoulos Klonis express the spirit of the production, something that Klonis (who was familiar with the European avant-garde) interpreted through the use of expressionistic, bulky, architectural cubes and Jessner stairs. There exists similar directions to modern painters such as Spyros Papaloukas and Fotis Kontoglou, who worked on the sets, as well as those for lighting and special effects.

The theatrical tradition that Fotos Politis created at Greece's National Theater, was continued after his death in 1934 by Costis Bastias and director Dimitris Rondiris. The following year, Bastias became director of repertoire, a new institution for that time, and wrote a 68-page report setting down both the theoretical principles of a National Theater and the specific plays that should be staged from the ancient theater, Elizabethan theater, classical theater, contemporary theater and avant-garde theater, with a critical analysis of each. Theater reviewer Costas Georgousopoulos, who also teaches at the Department of Theater Studies at the University of Athens and discovered the report in 1991, wrote:

A most important document concerning our theatrical studies, which establishes that the natural stages for ancient tragedy are the open-air theaters of antiquity and further substantiates a theatrical point of view, almost avant-garde, whose influence is only realized today.

On the other hand, Dimitris Rondiris, who had studied at the Reinhardt Seminar and had worked as an assistant to Max Reinhardt at the Salzburg Festival, when Reinhardt was director of the Deutsches Theater in Berlin, had been recalled to Athens by the board of the National Theater to become assistant director to Fotos Politis. After Politis' death, he succeeded him as prime stage director of the National Theater, and after World War II became its director general. Rondiris, with Bastias, continued the tradition of the National Theater, enriched it and added their theory that the tragedies of the ancient Greek poets are staged only in the open air theaters of antiquity, for which they were written, and not in the closed Renaissance theaters. This is a view that had not been adopted by Fotos Politis.

From 1935 until April 1941, when the Axis powers occupied Greece, the tradition, as well as the fame, of the National Theater grew by leaps and bounds, with Bastias becoming director general (1937), and the passing of a new law that gave him the authority to act more or less independently, despite the existence of a dictatorship, and Rondiris, perfecting his exhaustive teaching methods and his unique staging inspiration. The National Theater became a huge organization with its actors, directors, set and costume designers, musicians, dancers and a whole operatic company that was added and began its performances in 1940, The National Opera of Greece. The major emphasis of Bastias and Rondiris was the revival of ancient Greek tragedy with performances throughout Greece and abroad. One of the most renowned was the first performance of ancient tragedy since antiquity at the theater of Epidaurus with the Electra of Sophocles in 1938.

At first, the Theater traveled to other Greek cities, like Patras and Thessaloniki. Then Greek architect Constantine Doxiadis designed a traveling theater with trucks and buses that could be set up anywhere and covered the whole country. It was named Arma Thespidos (The Chariot of Thespis). In 1939, the main company of the National (Royal) Theater traveled abroad for the first time. It began with Alexandria and Cairo in the spring and after returning to Athens left again in June and July to perform Sophocles' Electra and Shakespeare's Hamlet, at Oxford, Cambridge, London, Frankfurt and Berlin carefully balancing the two sides which by the end of that summer would be at war.

The Theater's "Grand Tour", as it came to be called among theatrical circles, was a great success both in the U.K. and in Germany and was rated as equal to the Comédie-Française and the Moscow Art Theater. Concerning Dimitri Rondiris' stage direction the reviewers wrote that he surpassed the wildest dreams of his teacher Max Reinhardt, while Richard Prentis noted:

The Greek acting of Hamlet the other night came off magnificently. It found not a new world but an old one —the world of Shakespeare.

The News Chronicle's Henry Bean wrote: "Hamlet in modern Greek —a new way of doing Shakespeare to end all new ways" and commented about the Electra that: "It takes many years in perfecting the difficult technique of the spoken chorus". And W. A. Darlington noted in the Daily Telegraph: "The most impressive performance of the Electra that I have seen". But in the end, after the performance of the Electra at His Majesty's Theatre, the venerable The Times of London wrote:

The success of the Greek Royal Theatre, of which last night's performance gave proof, not as an organization only but as an artistic project, is in great measure due to the man, himself a dramatist of high rank, who has long watched over its fortunes and is its Director-General. London, having had opportunity to enjoy the fruits of his work, may now express gratitude to him as an ambassador of his nation's art, for certainly in no country has the stage owed more to the energy, enthusiasm, and connoisseurship of a single man than the Greek stage owes to M. Costis Bastias.

Post mortem recognition of Fotos Politis, as well as his successors and students.

== Works ==
- "Tsimiskis" (a tragedy), review Νέα Ζωή (New Life), Alexandria, Egypt, pp. 49–109.
- "Karagiozis the Great" (satirical play), Athens 1924.
- Fotos Politis, Επιλογή κριτικών άρθρων (A selection of reviews), vol. I & II, Theater reviews, vol. III, Literary reviews. Edited by Nicos Politis, Ikaros Editions, Athens 1983.

== Sources ==
- Arvaniti, Katerina, Η αρχαία ελληνική τραγωδία στο Εθνικό Θέατρο (Ancient Greek Tragedy at the National Theater), vol. I, Θωμάς Οικονόμου - Φώτος Πολίτης - Δημήτρης Ροντήρης (Thomas Oikonomou – Fotos Politis – Dimitris Rondiris), Athens 2010. ISBN 978 960 211 9174.
- Bastias, Costis, "Φώτος Πολίτης" (Fotos Politis), periodical Evdomas, June 20, 1931. Reprinted in: Costis Bastias, Φιλολογικοί Περίπατοι (Literary Promenades, Conversations with 38 authors), pp. 134–141, Kastaniotis Editions, Athens 1999. ISBN 960-03-2577-4.
- Bastias, Costis, "Fotos Politis dies yesterday", daily Ι Kathemerini, December 4, 1934.
- Bastias, John C., Κωστής Μπαστιάς — Δημοσιογραφία, Θέατρο, Λογοτεχνία (a biography), (Costis Bastias — Journalism, Theater, Literature), chapter 17, "The National Theater I — The Fotos Politis Era (1930 - 1934), pp. 183-210. Kastaniotis Editions, Athens 2005. ISBN 960-03-3969-4.
- Gouli, Eleni, "Πολίτης Φώτος" (Politis, Fotos), in the Λεξικό Νεοελληνικής Λογοτεχνίας (Dictionary of Modern Greek Literature), Patakis Editions, Athens 2007. ISBN 978-960-16-2237-8.
- Lygizos, Mitsos, Το νεοελληνικό πλάι στο παγκόσμιο θέατρο (Modern Greek theater next to world theater), vol. B, Athens 1980.
