= Aimilios Veakis =

Greek actor

- Born: December 13, 1884; Piraeus, Greece
- Died: June 29, 1951 (aged 66); Athens, Greece
- Occupation: Actor

Aimilios Veakis (Greek: Αιμίλιος Βεάκης; December 13, 1884 – June 29, 1951) was a Greek actor. An active member of the National Liberation Front during the Axis occupation of Greece, he was persecuted for his leftist beliefs during the White Terror.

== Biography ==
Aimilios Veakis was the grandson of the scholar and theatrical author Ioannis Venakis, but was orphaned at a very early age, and was raised by childless relatives. Over the objections of his guardians, in 1900, at the age of 16, he enrolled in the Royal Drama School. The school abruptly stopped functioning though, and Veakis enrolled in the School of Fine Arts, where he studied painting. Eventually, however, he broke off his studies and began working as an actor in Volos in the company of Evangelia Nika. His career was interrupted due to his drafting into the army during the Balkan Wars of 1912–13, where he received a field promotion to sergeant for valour.

Returning from the war, Veakis went on to cooperate with the most famous companies of the time (Lepeniotis, Kalogerikou, Kotopouli, Cybele, Oikonomou) and distinguished himself in all theatrical genres, especially in classic tragedy and drama. His performance of the title role in Oedipus Rex under the direction of Fotos Politis with the Greek Theatre Society was considered a landmark in his career. From 1932 he reached the apogee of his career in the National Theatre of Greece, serving both as company director and as a professor of acting in the National Theatre's drama school. In 1938 he performed in the production of King Lear.

During the Axis occupation of Greece in World War II he became a member of the National Liberation Front, fleeing to the mountains with other actors, where they gave theatrical performances for the Resistance. Following the Varkiza Agreement and the White Terror that followed, he was persecuted for his leftist beliefs, with his health suffering as a result. He retired in 1947 but performed sporadically thereafter, including his final farewell performances in the National Theatre in April and May 1951. He died lonely and poor and he was buried at the Athens First Cemetery.

== Legacy and recognition ==
After his death, Veakis was recognized for his contributions to modern Greek theatre. The Veakeio Theatre in Kastella, Piraeus, built by the junta-installed mayor Aristeidis Skylitsis in 1969 and named after him, was renamed in Veakis' honour in 1976. A bust of Veakis was also erected in front of the Municipal Theatre of Piraeus, while from 1994 on the Theatrical Museum of Greece presents the biennial "Aimilios Veakis Award" for outstanding male leading actor performances, and the "Veakis Award" for lifetime achievement in theatre.

== Filmography ==
Year	Film	Greek name	Role
1927	Eros kai kymata	Έρως και κύματα	-
1929	To limani ton dakryon	Το λιμάνι των δακρύων	-
1929	Astero (1929)	Αστέρω	Mr. Miltos
1943	The Voice of the Heart	Η φωνή της καρδιάς	-
1946	Prosopa lismonimena	Πρόσωπα λησμονημένα	-
1949	Arravoniasmata	Αρραβωνιάσματα	-
1950	I apachides ton Athinon	Οι απάχηδες των Αθηνών	-

== Published works ==
Veakis also published poetry collections, plays and novels such as:

- Polemikai Entyposeis ("Impressions from War"), 1914
- Tragoudia tis agapis kai tis tavernas ("Songs of Love and of the Tavern"), poetry, 1926
- Dervenochoria, poetry, 1945
- Tapeinoi kai katafronemenoi, theatrical adaptation of Dostoyevsky's novel Humiliated and Insulted, 1934
- Rinoula ("Little Irene"), drama
- Symplegades, drama
- Oi theatrinoi ("The actors"), novel
- Epta ekatommyria eisodima ("Income seven million"), theatrical comedy
