= Katina Paxinou =

Greek actress (1900–1973)

- Κατίνα Παξινού
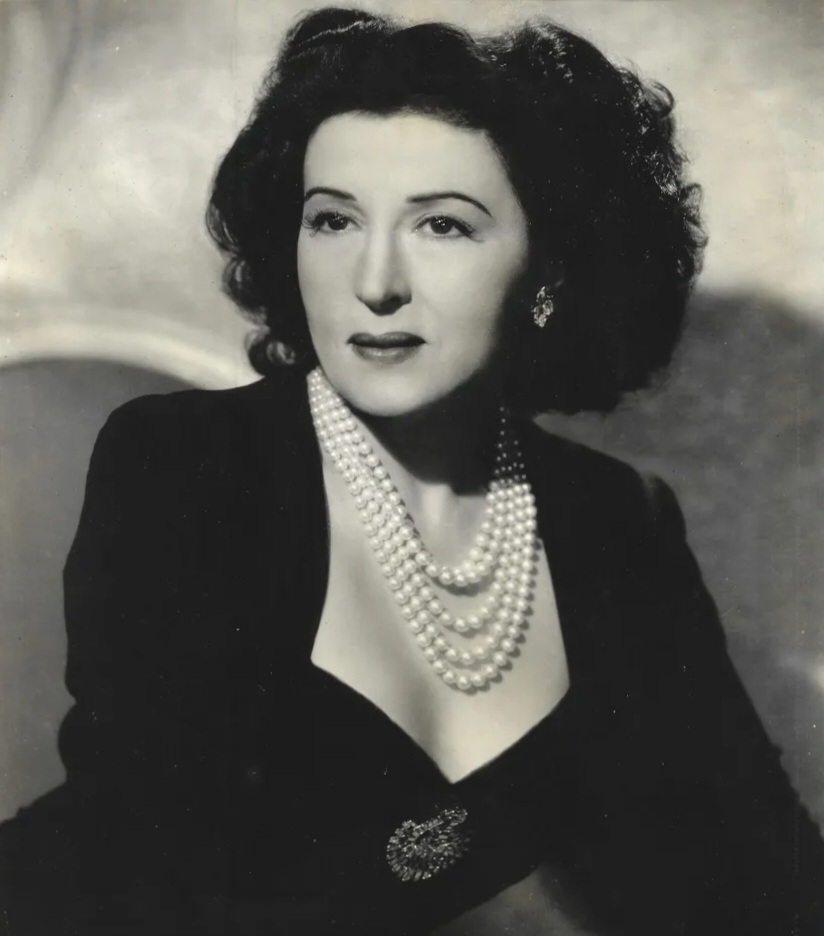
- Paxinou in 1945
- Born: Ekaterini Konstantopoulou; 17 December 1900; Piraeus, Kingdom of Greece
- Died: 22 February 1973 (aged 72); Athens, Greece
- Resting place: First Cemetery of Athens
- Occupation: Actress
- Years active: 1928–1970
- Spouses: Ioannis Paxinos (m. 1917; div. 1923) Alexis Minotis (m. 1940)
- Children: 2
- Relatives: Brioni Farrell (grandniece)
- Awards: Academy Award for Best Supporting Actress; Hollywood Walk of Fame

Katina Paxinou (Greek: Κατίνα Παξινού; 17 December 1900– 22 February 1973) was a Greek film and stage actress.

She started her stage career in Greece in 1928 and was one of the founding members of the National Theatre of Greece in 1932. The outbreak of World War II found her in the United Kingdom and she later moved to the United States, where she made her film debut in For Whom the Bell Tolls (1943) and won the Academy Award for Best Supporting Actress and the Golden Globe Award for Best Supporting Actress. She became a naturalized citizen of the United States in 1951, but returned to Greece the following year, where she focused on her stage career and appeared in a number of European films including Rocco and His Brothers (1960).

== Early life ==
Paxinou was born Ekaterini Konstantopoulou in 1900, the daughter of Vassilis Konstantopoulos and Eleni Malandrinou. She trained as an opera singer at the Conservatoire de Musique de Genève and later in Berlin and Vienna. According to her biography in a 1942 Playbill, Paxinou's family disowned her after she decided to seek a permanent stage career.

== Career ==
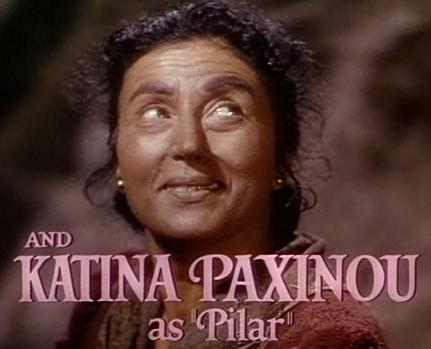
Paxinou in the For Whom the Bell Tolls trailer.

Paxinou made her debut at the Municipal Theatre of Piraeus in 1920 in the operatic version of Maurice Maeterlinck's Sister Beatrice, with a score by Dimitri Mitropoulos. She first appeared in a play in 1928, as a member of Marika Kotopouli's troupe, in an Athens production of Henry Bataille's The Naked Woman. In 1931, she joined Aimilios Veakis' troupe along with Alexis Minotis, where she translated and appeared in the first of Eugene O'Neill's plays to be staged in Greece, Desire Under the Elms. She also appeared in Anton Chekhov's Uncle Vanya and August Strindberg's The Father.

In 1932, Paxinou was among the actors who inaugurated the recently re-founded National Theatre of Greece, where she worked until 1940. During her stay in the National Theatre, she distinguished herself on Greek stage starring in major plays, such as Sophocles' Electra, Henrik Ibsen's Ghosts and William Shakespeare's Hamlet, which were also performed in London, Frankfurt and Berlin. When World War II began, Paxinou was performing in London. Unable to return to Greece, she emigrated in May 1941 to the United States, where she had earlier appeared in 1931, performing Clytemnestra in a modern Greek version of Electra. She was selected to play the role of Pilar in the film For Whom the Bell Tolls (1943), for which she won an Oscar and a Golden Globe Award for Best Supporting Actress - Motion Picture. She made one British film, Uncle Silas (1947), which features Jean Simmons in the main female role and worked in Italy for 20th Century Fox, playing the mother of Tyrone Power's character in Prince of Foxes (1949). Katina Paxinou also played the role of Sophie, in the film Mr. Arkadin (1955), directed and written by Orson Welles in which he played Arkadin, the main character. After this film, Paxinou worked for a Hollywood studio only once more, again playing a gypsy woman in the religious epic The Miracle (1959).

In 1950, Paxinou resumed her stage career. In her native Greece, she formed the Royal Theatre of Athens with Alexis Minotis, her principal director and husband since 1940.

Paxinou made several appearances on the Broadway stage and television as well. She played the lead in Ibsen's Hedda Gabler for 12 performances at New York City's Longacre Theatre, opening on 28 June 1942. She also played the principal role in the first production in English of Federico Garcia Lorca's The House of Bernarda Alba, at the ANTA Playhouse in New York in 1951, and a BBC television production of Lorca's Blood Wedding (Bodas de sangre), broadcast on 2 June 1959.

== Death ==
Paxinou died after a long battle with cancer in Athens on 22 February 1973 at the age of 72. She was survived by her husband and her one daughter from her first marriage to Ioannis Paxinos, whose surname she continued using after their divorce. Her remains are buried at First Cemetery of Athens.

== Museum ==
The Paxinou-Minotis Museum is an Athens museum featuring memorabilia of the life of Paxinou, including furniture, paintings and sketches, photographs, books and personal effects donated by Paxinou's husband, director Alexis Minotis, and include his personal library and theatrical archive.

== Filmography ==
Year	Title	Role	Notes
1943	For Whom the Bell Tolls	Pilar	Academy Award for Best Supporting Actress; Golden Globe Award for Best Supporting Actress – Motion Picture; New York Film Critics Circle Award for Best Actress (2nd place)
1943	Hostages	Maria	
1945	Confidential Agent	Mrs. Melandez	
1947	Uncle Silas	Madame de la Rougierre	
1947	Mourning Becomes Electra	Christine Mannon	
1949	Prince of Foxes	Mona Constanza Zoppo	
1955	Mr. Arkadin	Sophie	
1959	The Miracle	La Roca	
1960	Rocco e i suoi Fratelli	Rosaria Parondi	
1961	Morte di un Bandito	Silvia	
1962	The Trial		scenes deleted
1968	Tante Zita	Aunt Zita	
1969	To Nisi tis Afroditis	Lambrini	
1970	Un Été Sauvage	Marya	
1970	The Martlet's Tale	Orsetta	

== Awards and nominations ==
Year	Award	Category	Production	Result
1943	New York Film Critics Awards	New York Film Critics Circle Award for Best Actress	For Whom the Bell Tolls	Nominated
1943	Photoplay Awards	Photoplay Award for Best Performance of the Month (October)	For Whom the Bell Tolls	Won
1943	National Board of Review	National Board of Review Award for Best Actress	For Whom the Bell Tolls	Won
1943	Golden Globe Awards	Golden Globe Award for Best Supporting Actress - Motion Picture	For Whom the Bell Tolls	Won
1943	Academy Awards	Academy Award for Best Supporting Actress	For Whom the Bell Tolls	Won
1960	Hollywood Walk of Fame	Star on the Walk of Fame - Motion Picture	For Whom the Bell Tolls	Won
