= Veakeio Municipal Theater =

Greek theater in Piraeus

Veakio Municipal Theater
- Βεάκειο Δημοτικό Θέατρο
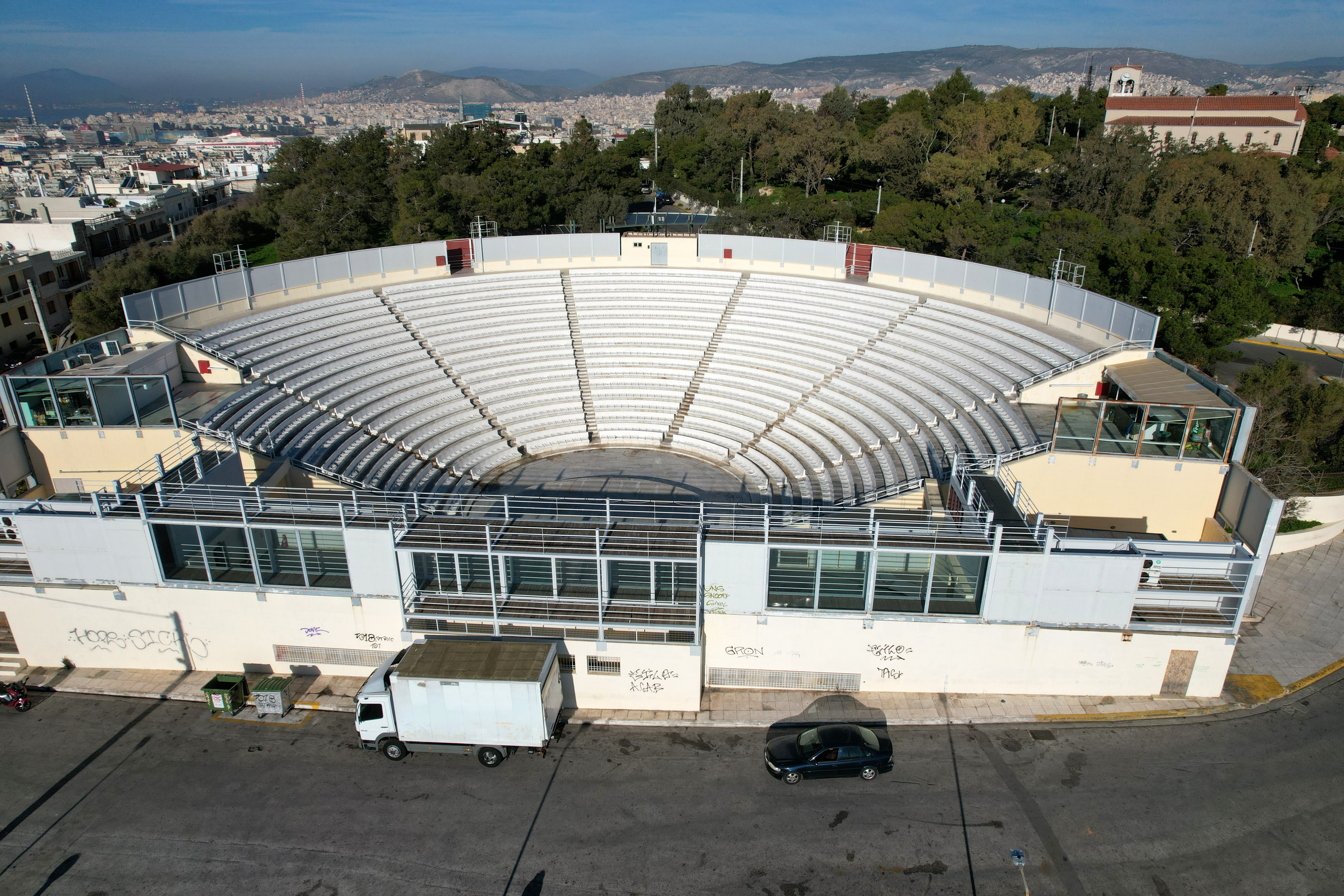
- The Veakio Municipal Theater in Kastella, Piraeus
- Interactive map of Veakio Municipal Theater
- Location: Kastella, Piraeus, Greece
- Coordinates: 37.9425°N 23.6533°E
- Owner: Municipality of Piraeus
- Operator: Municipality of Piraeus Culture Directorate
- Capacity: 2,000
- Type: Open-air amphitheater

Construction
- Opened: June 20, 1969

Website
- veakeiotheatre.gr

The Veakio Municipal Theater (Greek: Βεάκειο Δημοτικό Θέατρο) is a 2,000-seat open-air amphitheater located in the Kastella neighborhood of Piraeus, Greece. Built in 1969 during Greece's military junta period, the theater was originally named "Skylitsio" after the junta-appointed mayor who commissioned it. Following the restoration of democracy, it was renamed in 1976 to honor Aimilios Veakis, one of Greece's most celebrated actors and a Greek Resistance fighter. The venue serves as a premier summer cultural destination in the Athens metropolitan area, hosting ancient Greek drama, contemporary theater, concerts, and dance performances.

== History ==
=== Construction during military rule (1969) ===
The theater was constructed in 1969 under the authority of Aristeidis Skylitsis, the junta-appointed mayor of Piraeus who served from August 5, 1967, to September 18, 1974. Originally named the "Skylitsio" (Σκυλίτσειο) after its commissioner, the venue represented the dictatorship's efforts to create cultural infrastructure.

The theater's inauguration took place on June 20, 1969, with a performance of Verdi's opera Nabucco by the National Lyric Stage (Εθνική Λυρική Σκηνή). Vice-Regent Georgios Zoitakis attended the opening ceremony. Some archival sources, including footage held by Greece's National Audiovisual Archive (Εθνικό Οπτικοακουστικό Αρχείο), date the inauguration to June 22, 1969.

=== Democratic renaming (1976) ===
Following the restoration of democracy in 1974, the theater underwent a symbolic transformation. In 1976, it was renamed "Veakeio" (Βεάκειο) to honor Aimilios Veakis (1884–1951), one of Greece's most celebrated actors and a resistance fighter during the German occupation. The choice to honor a leftist resistance fighter whose career was later persecuted during the post-war White Terror represented a deliberate reclamation of the cultural space from its authoritarian origins.

== Architecture ==
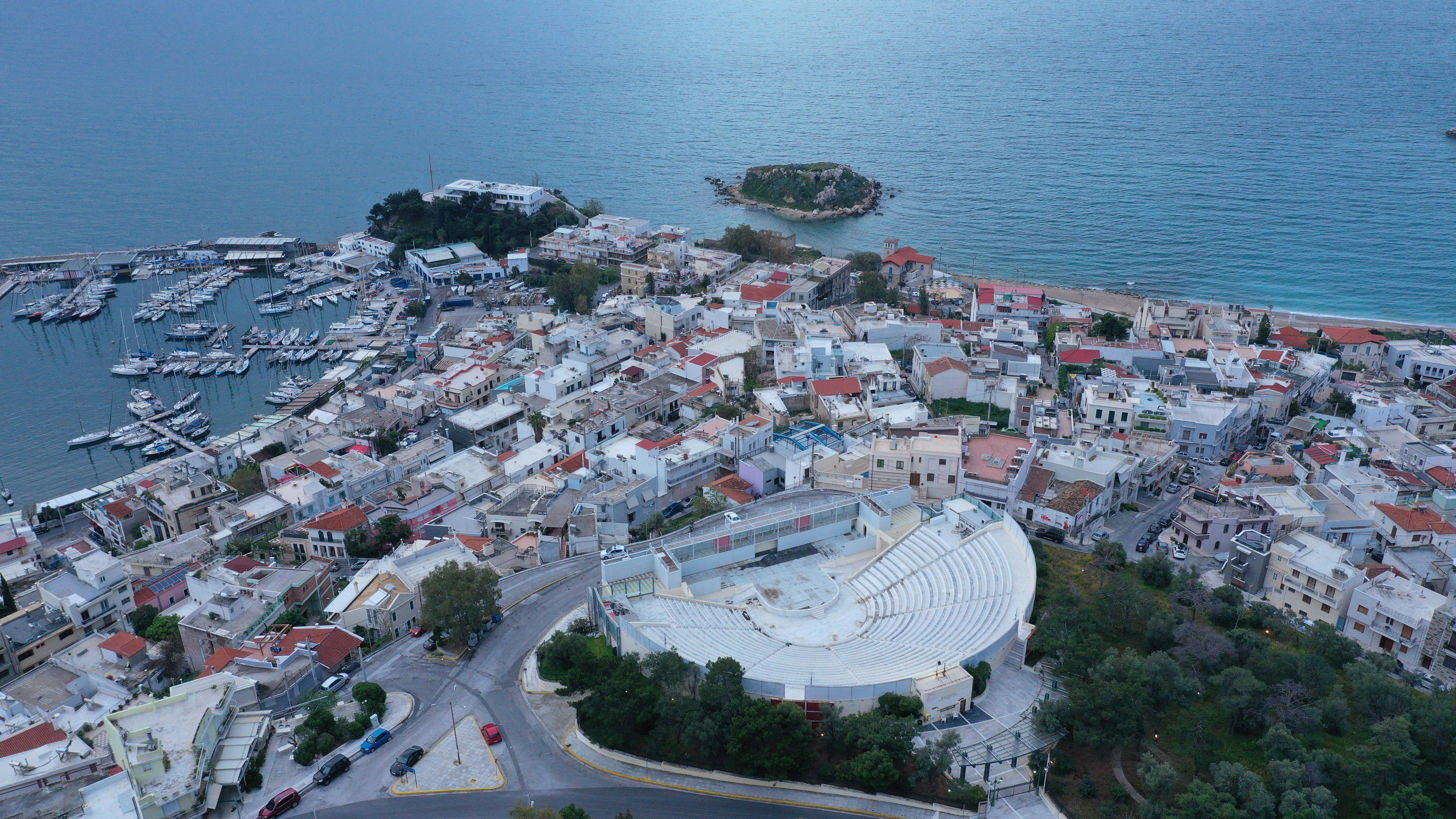
Aerial view of the Veakio Municipal Theater

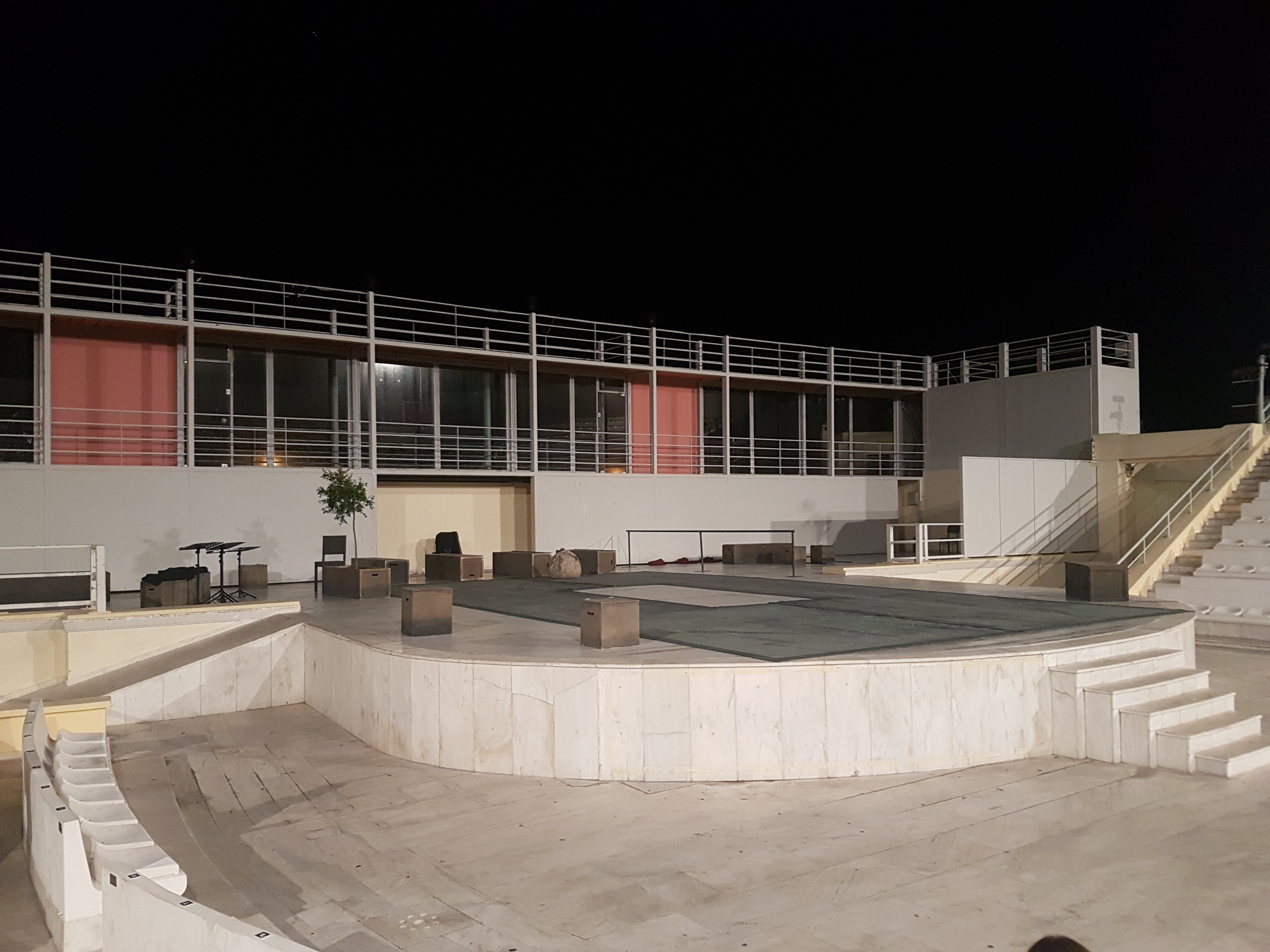
The theater stage in 2017

The Veakeio follows the design principles of ancient Greek theater architecture, featuring an open-air amphitheater configuration with semicircular seating that evokes classical theaters. The venue accommodates 2,000 spectators and functions exclusively as a summer theater (θερινό θέατρο), operating from June through September.

Positioned at approximately 87 meters above sea level on Profiti Ilias (Prophet Elijah) Hill in the Kastella neighborhood, the theater offers commanding views of the Saronic Gulf and the city of Piraeus below. This elevated location connects the theatrical experience with the maritime character of Greece's principal port city.

== Location and access ==
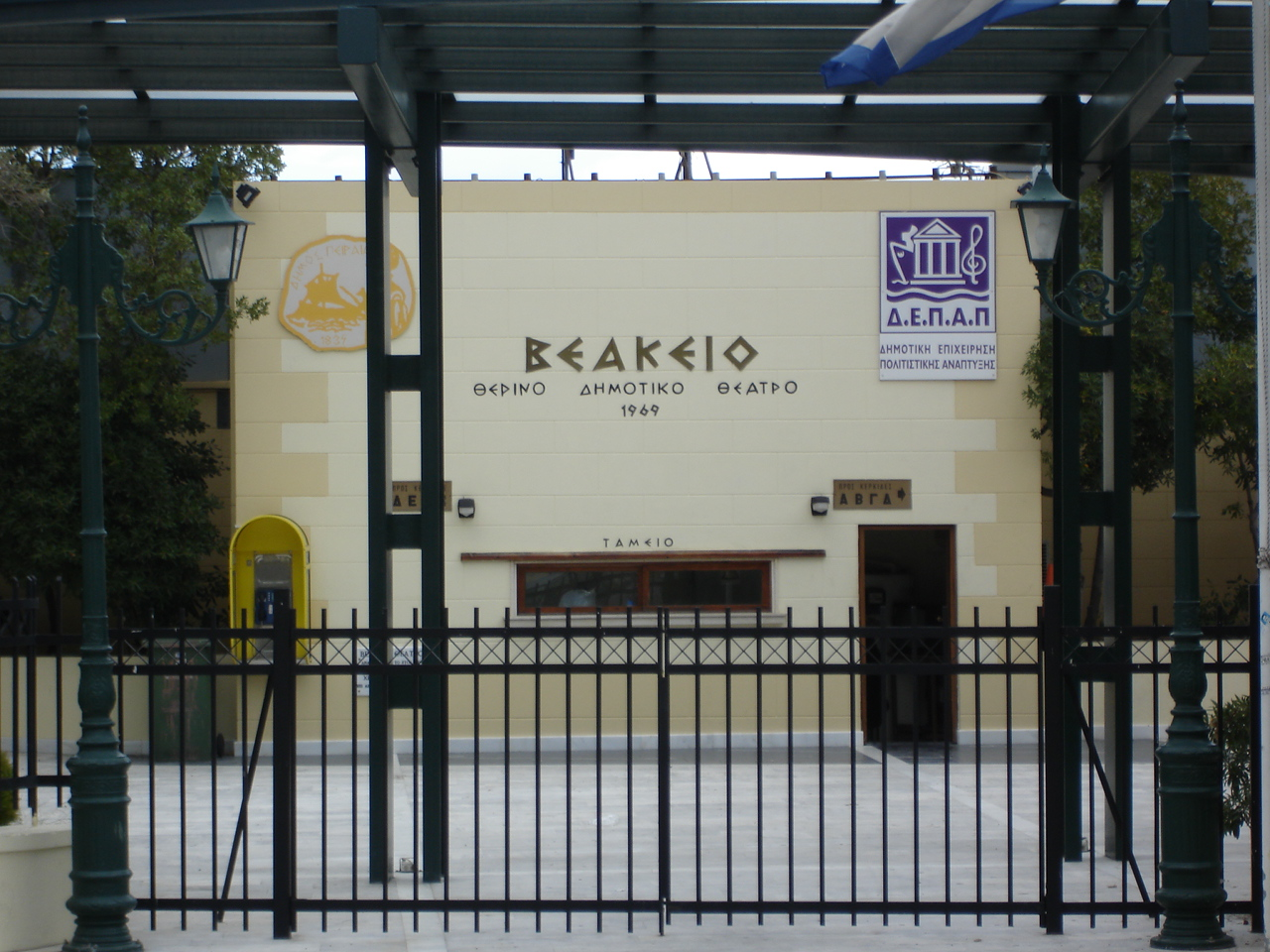
Theater ticketing office

The theater is located at Profiti Ilia Hill, Kastella, Piraeus 185 33 (Λόφος Προφήτη Ηλία, Καστέλλα, Πειραιάς 185 33). Visitors can reach the venue via Athens Metro Line 1 (Green Line) to Dimotiko Theatro station, followed by a 20-minute walk or short bus ride. Bus lines 904, 909, and 915 serve stops near Kastella Hill.

== Cultural significance ==
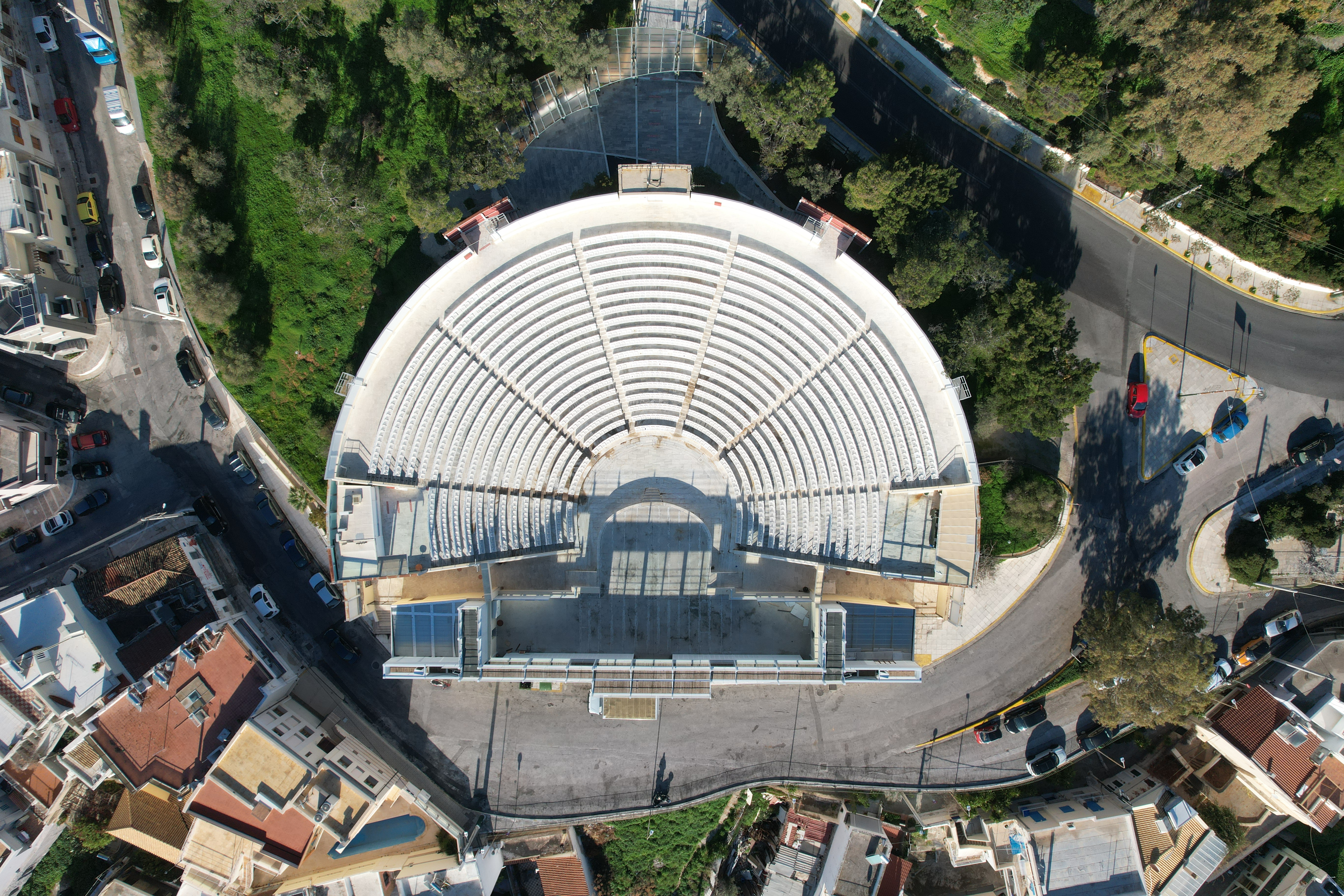
Overhead view of the amphitheater

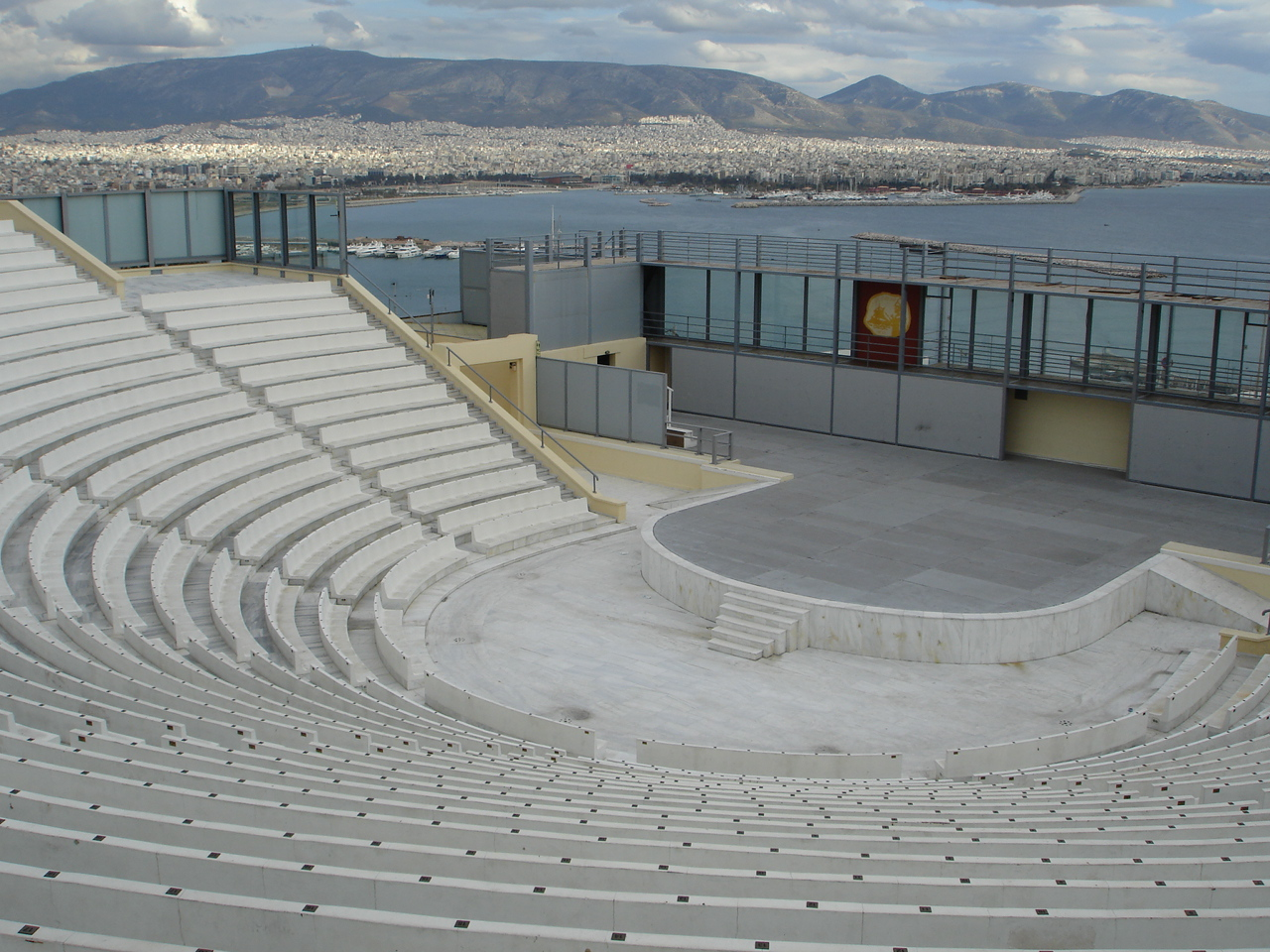
The theater overlooks the Saronic Gulf

=== Programming ===
The Veakeio serves as one of the most popular cultural destinations in the Attica region. The venue's programming includes:

- Ancient Greek drama
- Contemporary theatrical productions
- Musical concerts spanning classical to popular Greek music
- Dance performances
- Children's theater
- Stand-up comedy

The theater operates under the management of the Municipality of Piraeus's Culture Directorate (Διεύθυνση Πολιτισμού του Δήμου Πειραιά). For the 2025 summer season, the municipality scheduled over 90 events.

=== Notable events ===
The venue has hosted diverse cultural events beyond traditional theater, including the Miss Europe 1970 beauty pageant on September 15, 1970, documented in the National Audiovisual Archive.

== Recent developments ==
The theater underwent renovation in 2024–2025. As of 2025, the Veakeio remains fully operational as a summer venue, maintaining its traditional season from June through September. The venue has established a digital presence through its official website and social media channels.

== Distinction from Municipal Theatre of Piraeus ==
The Veakeio should not be confused with the Municipal Theatre of Piraeus (Δημοτικό Θέατρο Πειραιά), a separate indoor venue. That neoclassical theater was built 1881–1883, inaugurated April 9, 1895, and designed by architect Ioannis Lazarimos with approximately 1,300-seat capacity. While both theaters serve Piraeus under municipal management, they represent different eras and architectural traditions—the Municipal Theatre exemplifying 19th-century European opera house design, while the Veakeio embodies 20th-century revival of ancient open-air theatrical forms.

== Gallery ==
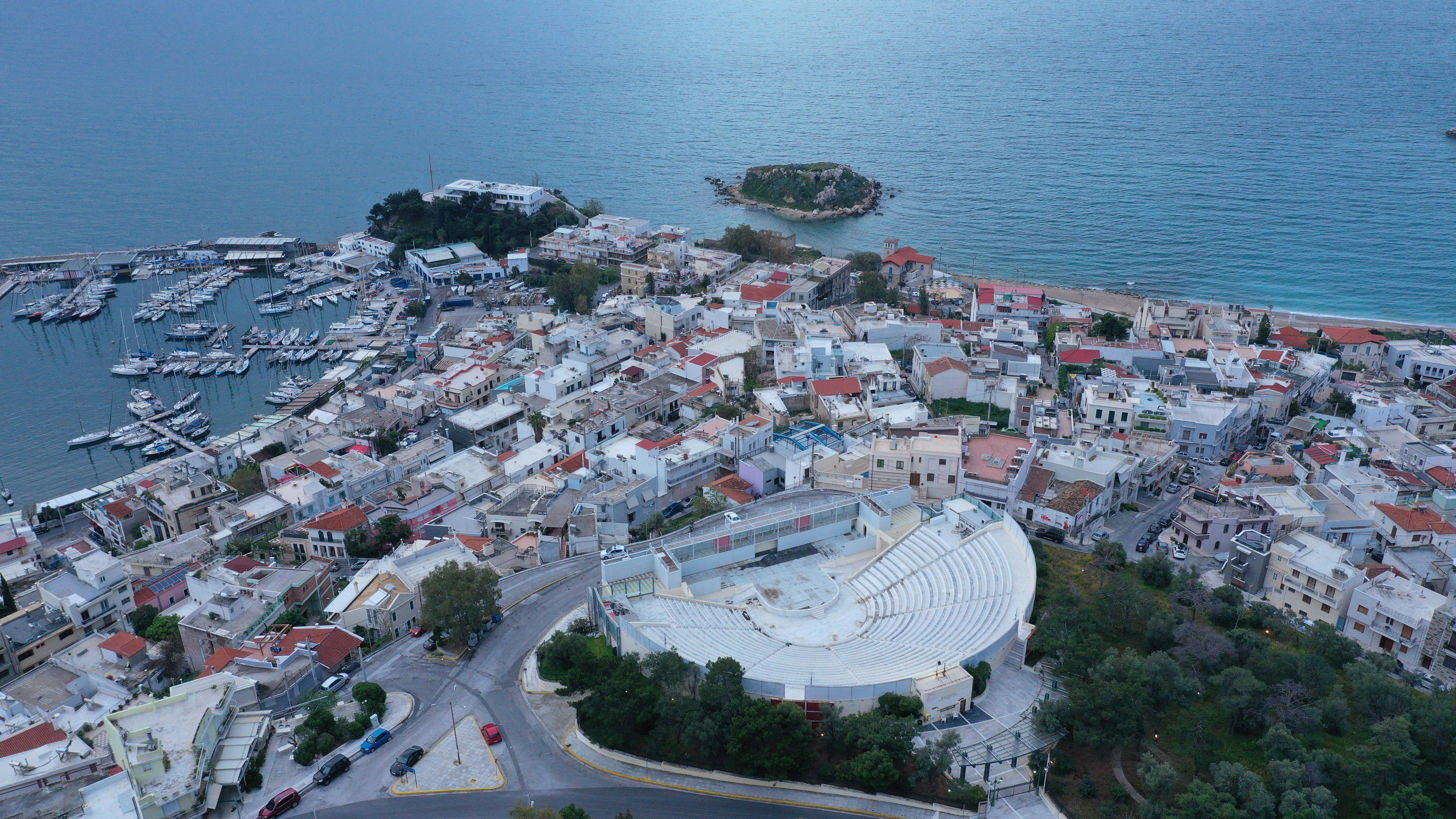
Aerial view of the Veakio Municipal Theater

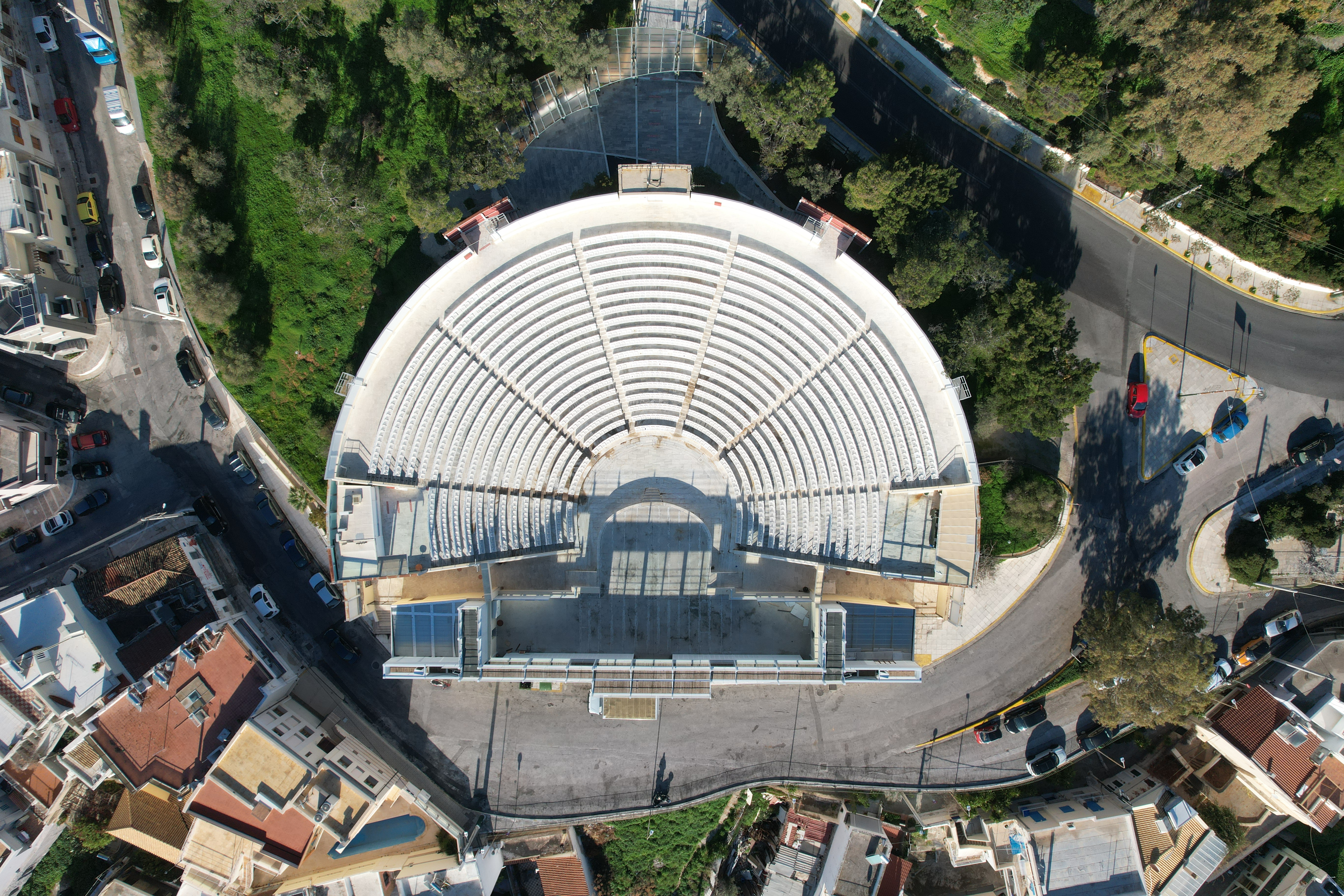
Overhead drone view of the amphitheater

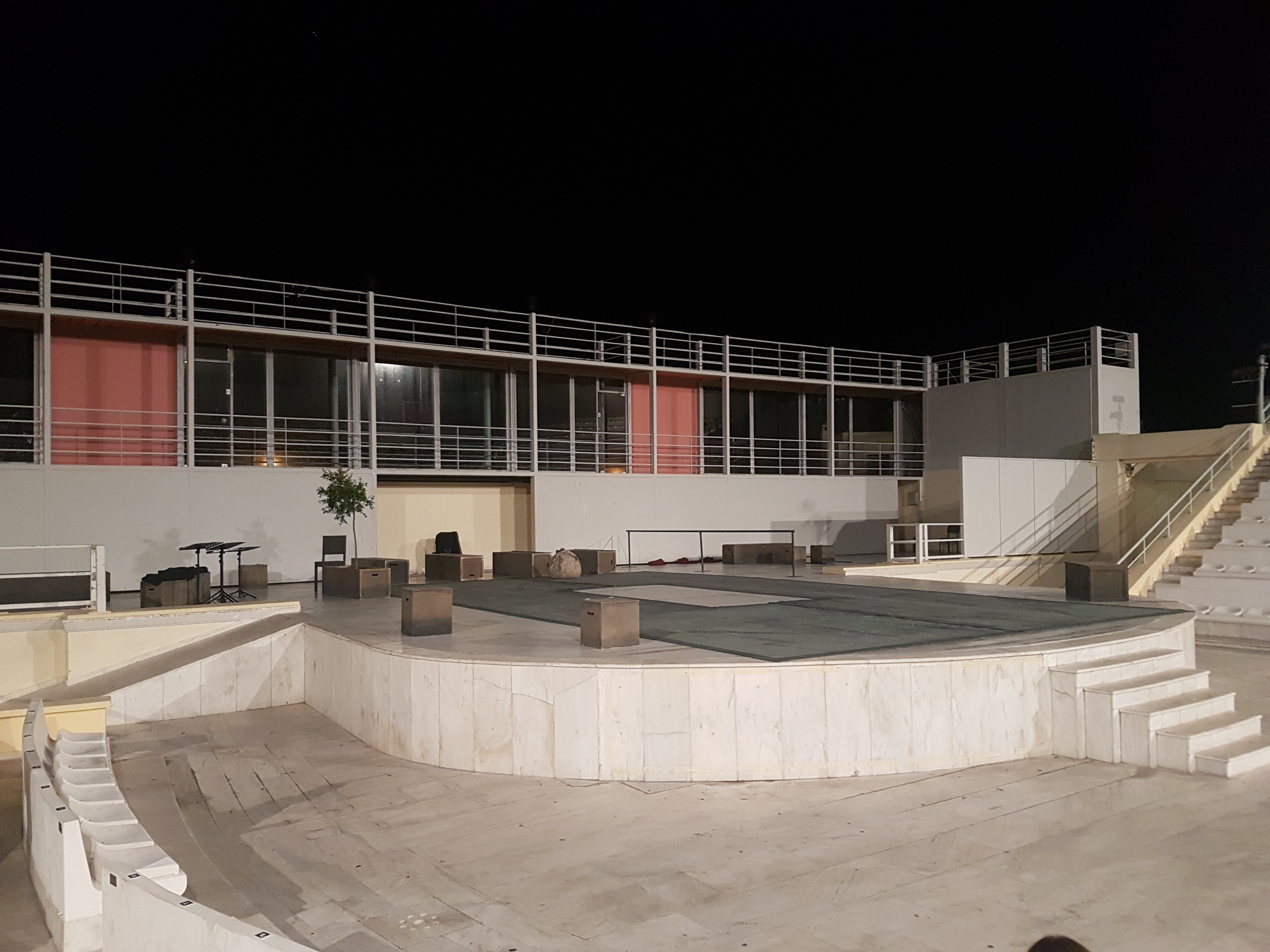
The theater stage in 2017

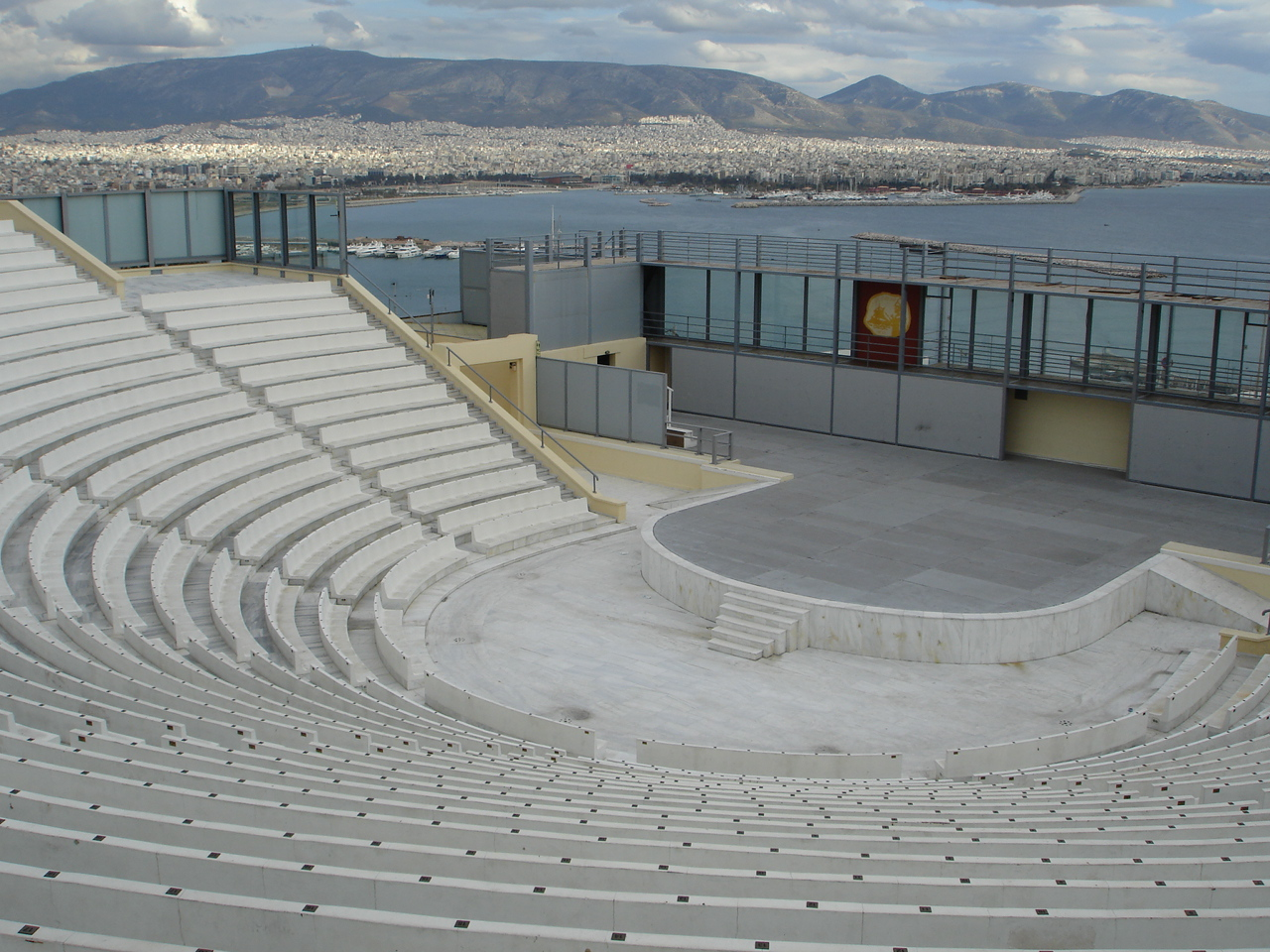
The theater overlooks the Saronic Gulf and Mediterranean Sea

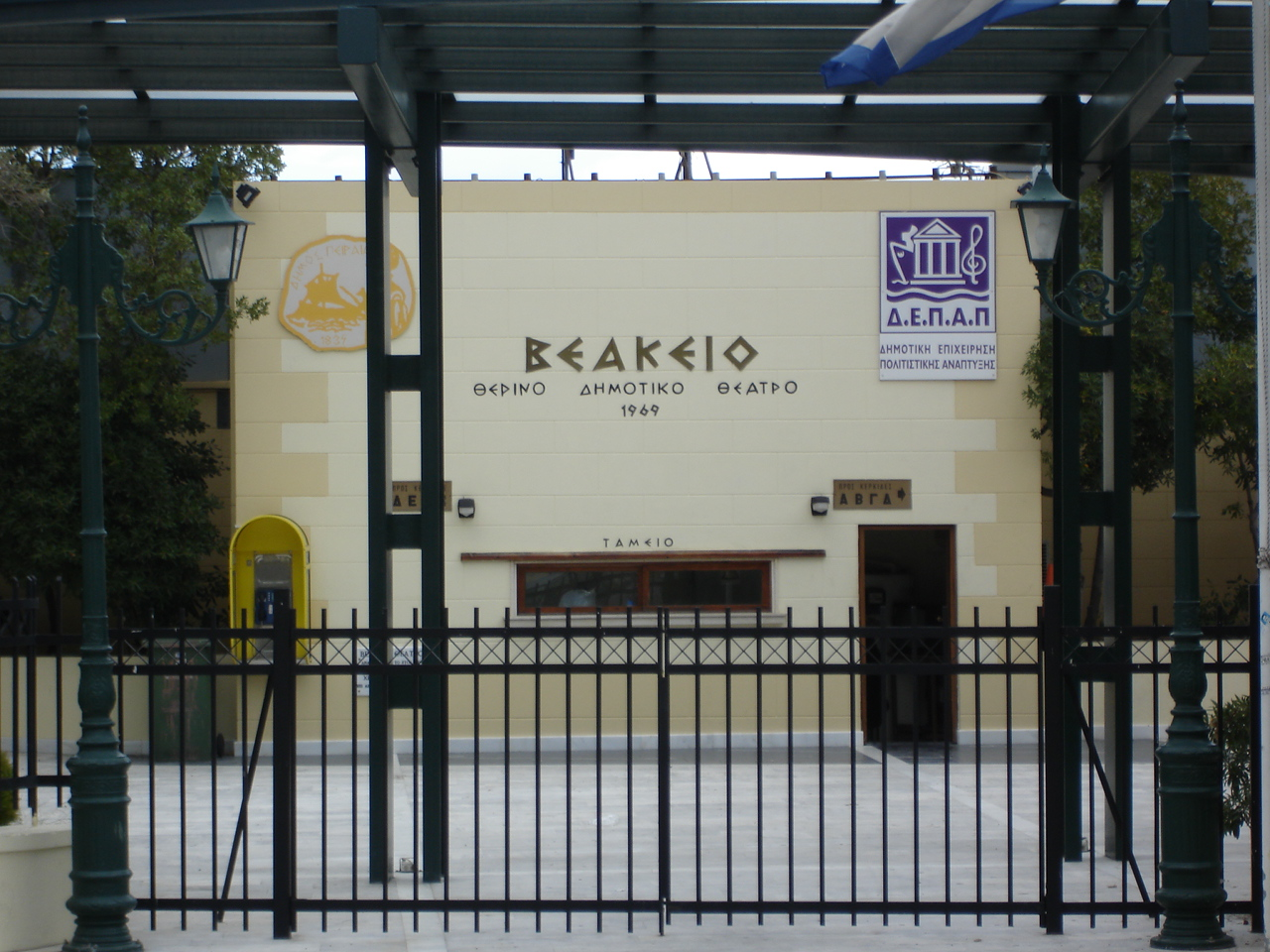
Theater ticketing office

== See also ==
- Aimilios Veakis
- Theatre of ancient Greece
- Piraeus
- Greek military junta of 1967–1974
- Metapolitefsi
- Municipal Theatre of Piraeus
