= Thomas Oikonomou =

Greek actor and director

Thomas Oikonomou Θωμάς Οικονόμου
- Born: 12 July 1864; Vienna, Austrian Empire
- Died: March 1927 (aged 62); Athens, Greece
- Occupation: actor

Thomas Oikonomou (Greek: Θωμάς Οικονόμου, 1864–1927) was a Greek actor and one of the first modern Greek directors.

== Biography ==
Son of the writer Aristeidos Oikonomou, Oikonomou was born in Vienna, Austria in what was then a part of Austrian Empire in 1864 and studied and begun his career as an actor. He arrived in Greece in 1900-1901 and begun as a professor at the Dramatic School what was then Royal Theatre and (after the separation of Angelos Vlahos) as a director. He knew the young Marika Kotopouli who he acted together in an erotic part and became a protagonist of that company. In 1906, he left the Royal Theatre with Marika Kotopouli and worked together at Marika's father's company Dimitris Kotopoulis where he directed and presented the new productions at the Athenian theatre. His luck was crowned by the critics and a loud noise at failed receipts that made Oikonomou in theatrical productions and his works to collapse. From 1918 until 1922, he worked at the Athens Odeum as professor and journalist of the company. Between all students he taught and Dimitris Rontiris. His contribution at the Greek theatre as a director and a hypocrite as well as mainly from the student's spot thought he was fixed. He died in 1927.
