= We Have to Marry Them Off =

- Directed by: Mavrikios Novak
- Written by: Mavrikios Novak; Grigorios Xenopoulos (novel)
- Cinematography: Tonis Novak
- Edited by: Emil Provelengios
- Music by: Giorgos Mallidis
- Production company: Novak-Film
- Distributed by: Novak-Film
- Release date: 1953
- Running time: 70 minutes
- Country: Greece
- Language: Greek

We Have to Marry Them Off (Greek: Prepei na ta pantrepsoume) is a 1953 Greek romantic comedy film directed by Mavrikios Novak and starring Jenny Roussea, Dionysis Milas and Marika Anthopoulou.

== Cast ==
- Jenny Roussea as Lena
- Dionysis Milas as Miltos
- Marika Anthopoulou
- Apostolos Avdis as Dr. Apostolidis
- Popi Deligianni as Amalia
- Spyros Kapsalis as Efthymis
- Giorgos Loukakis as Mimis Marinopoulos
- Nelli Marselou
- Maria Mazaraki
- Thodoros Moridis as Periklis
- Andreas Moustras
- Virginia Petimezaki as Mary Marinopoulou
- Dimos Starenios as Giakoumis

== Bibliography ==
- Stathēs Balukos. Philmographia tou Hellēnikou kinēmatographou: 1914-1998. Aigokerōs, 1998.
