= Estia =

Greek newspaper

- Type: Daily evening newspaper
- Format: broadsheet
- Owner: "Estia Newspaper S.A." (Ioannis Filippakis)
- Founded: 1876/1894
- Political alignment: Conservativism
- City: Athens
- Country: Greece
- Website: www.estianews.gr

Estia (Greek: Ἑστία, lit. 'hearth') is a Greek national daily broadsheet newspaper published in Athens, Greece. It was founded in 1876 as a literary magazine and then in 1894 has been transformed into a newspaper, making it Greece's oldest daily newspaper still in circulation. It is named after the ancient Greek goddess Hestia, one of the Twelve Olympians. Estia is widely regarded as right wing in terms of political alignment and most often referred to as "conservative" and "nationalist" and is readily distinguishable as the only Greek newspaper still employing the old-fashioned polytonic system of accentuation. An "opinion newspaper" with a writing style acknowledged to be "incisive" and with a loyal readership also described as "exclusive", Estia is often treated not merely as a newspaper but as "an institution of bourgeois Athens". On the 120th anniversary of its publication (March 12, 2014), the President of Greece Karolos Papoulias issued a congratulatory note crediting the contribution of Estia to public life. Run as a family business for more than a century (1898–2015) and successively managed by the descendants of Adonis Kyrou, Estias Director since 2017 is Manolis Kottakis. Estia newspaper is owned, through "Estia Newspaper S.A.", by Ioannis Filippakis.

== Language ==
In the 1980s and 1990s, Estia was the only daily written in katharevousa, a purist and archaic form of modern Greek that was abolished as the official administrative language in 1976. In recent years, however, Estia has adopted a conservative form of Standard Modern Greek. Estia is also the only daily employing the polytonic system of accentuation, which was officially abandoned following legislation in 1982; Estia, nevertheless, uses a simplified polytonic orthography in which the grave accent is replaced by the acute.

== Format and layout ==
The paper's very first edition was misprinted, with Page 1 being on the back and Page 2 on the front. Adonis Kyrou decided to keep printing the paper the same way, and the tradition continued to 1997, when it was abandoned because of technical difficulties arising from the change from linotype machines to computer-editing.

Estia did not switch to a modern computer system until 1997. At that time Unicode-enabled software had become more widely available and it was possible to continue printing the newspaper in the polytonic system. Until then, the newspaper continued to be set and printed using Linotype machines. Estia is one of the few Greek newspapers printed in broadsheet format. It normally contains only about eight pages a day. There are no pictures on the "front" page, and no colour photographs at all.

The paper's most popular column has always been the feuilleton "Pennies, Eidisoules, Perierga" (Strokes, small news, curiosities), noted for its dry, acerbic wit.

== History ==
In 1876, Pavlos Diomidis founded a weekly publication named Ἑστία, which was a literary magazine similar to the present-day Nea Estia (Νέα Ἑστία) rather than a news-focused paper. Not until 1894 did the well-known poet and journalist Georgios Drosinis transform it into a daily newspaper about politics, culture and finance. In 1941, during the occupation of Greece by the German army, Estia closed, but soon after the liberation it resumed its publication. Estia has been managed by the Kyrou family for more than 120 years. Adonis Kyrou was its publisher from 1898 to 1918, Achilleus A. Kyrou and Kyros A. Kyrou from 1918 to 1950, Kyros A. Kyrou from 1950 to 1974, and Adonis K. Kyrou from 1974 until 1997, when the paper was taken over by Kyrou's nephew Alexis Zaousis.
