= Nea Estia =

Greek literary magazine

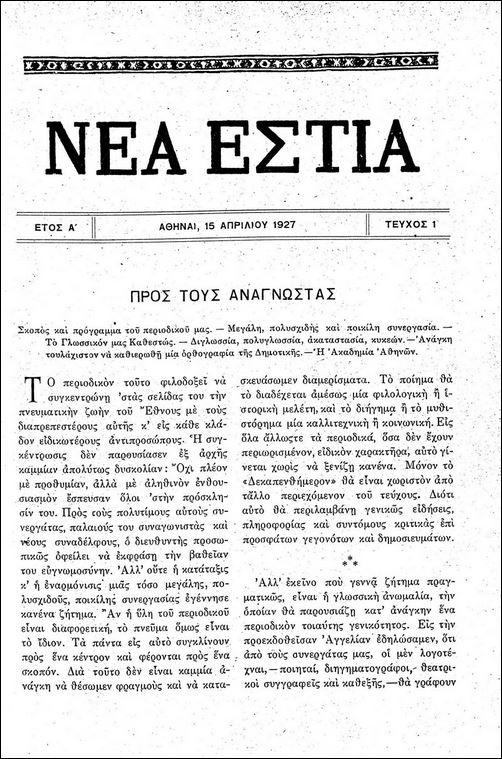
Nea Estia, the front page of the first edition, 15 April 1927

Nea Estia (Greek: Νέα Εστία) is a Greek literary magazine which has been circulating since 1927. It was founded by Konstantinos Sarandopoulos (d. 1972) with the international writer and publisher Gregorios Xenopoulos and is the longest-running literary magazine in Greece. Its director since 2012 is the writer and university professor Nikos Karapidakis and the publishing company is Nea Estia Booksellers, I.D. Kollarios & Co., which has been administered by its owner, the writer Eva Karaitidi, since 1998.

== Before Nea Estia ==
In the nineteenth-century, between 1876 and 1895 Estia (now a newspaper) was published, initially as a family periodical, later becoming a literary one. The directorship initially was held by the editor Pavlos Diomedes; after 1889 jointly with Nikolaos Politis, the folklorist and university professor and Georgios Drossinis, the poet, prose-writer and publisher. From 1894 until 1895 when it closed, it was taken over by the writer and publisher Gregorios Xenopoulos (as Iconographeia Estia), while at the same time George Drosinis started the newspaper Estia. Thirty years later, Xenopoulos wanted to revive the old periodical, but the newspaper Estia, which had come into the possession of Achilles Kyrou, legally precluded the use of the same name. Left in this position, the periodical took the name Nea Estia ("New Estia") and began circulation on 15 April 1927.

== Directors of the magazine ==
The first director was Gregorios Xenopoulos, novelist and publisher, from 1927 until 1932. For two years Gregrios Xenopoulos held the directorship together with Petros Charis, the prose-writer, essayist and academic (1933–34), who took over alone after 1934 until 1987 (a long-running service of fifty-four years). In 1987 the writer and critic Evangelos N. Moschos took over until 1998, the writer Stavros Zoumboulakis until 2012, and after that the historian Nikos E. Karapidakis.

== Publishers ==
The founding publisher of the magazine Nea Estia was Konstantinos Sarandoupoulos, who from 1925 had become a partner with his father-in-law Ioannis D. Kollaros. Ioannis D. Kollaros was presented as the publisher beginning in 1927, later this became "Estia Booksellers, I.D. Kollarios & Co.". (Note: The firm also operated a bookshop, which closed in 2013.) Later editions had Sarandopoulos together with I.D. Kollarou until 1956, when Kollaros died and continued with Sarandopoulos listed alone until 1972, when he died. The company was taken over after 1972 by his daughter, Marina "Mania" Koraitidi, which continued until 1998. From 1998 on the publication of the magazine has been run by her daughter, Eva Karaitidi, the writer.

== Critical reception ==
The viewpoints of Nea Estia are such that the magazine, whose publisher began "one of the most distinguished publications of the inter-war era", is an authoritative magazine in the world of letters and one which has constituted a "spiritual beacon" for many decades. Importance is attached to the fact that it never stopped circulating during World War II (a "publishing feat"). One characteristic of Nea Estia is that it maintains a neutral ideological stance, free of meaningful rivalries with other periodicals, with balanced choices of themes, styles and arrangement, while not taking an explicit or activist position on any social or political topic.

== Content ==
The purposes of the director of the magazine, Grigorios Xenopoulos, were made clear in a meditative four-page pamphlet which was distributed in February 1927, two months before the first edition of Nea Estia, outlining six principles:

1. Publication of chiefly original material
2. The introduction of new writers
3. The expansion of [existing] material
4. The republication of older works in order that:
  1. Literature might be published in Demotic Greek (Note: As opposed to puristic katharevousa, then prevalent among educated Greeks) with scientific works only by those writers who will use a form of language that will be accessible to all

The magazine and its content consist either literary works or studies of literature in Greece and around the world. At the close of the 20th century it gave a comprehensive view of Greek literary trends and criticism, but also more general coverage of visual and fine arts themes, exhibiting a multi-dimensional character, but always with a significant weighting toward literature.
