= Dimitris Rontiris =

Greek actor and director (1899–1982)

- Δημήτρης Ροντήρης
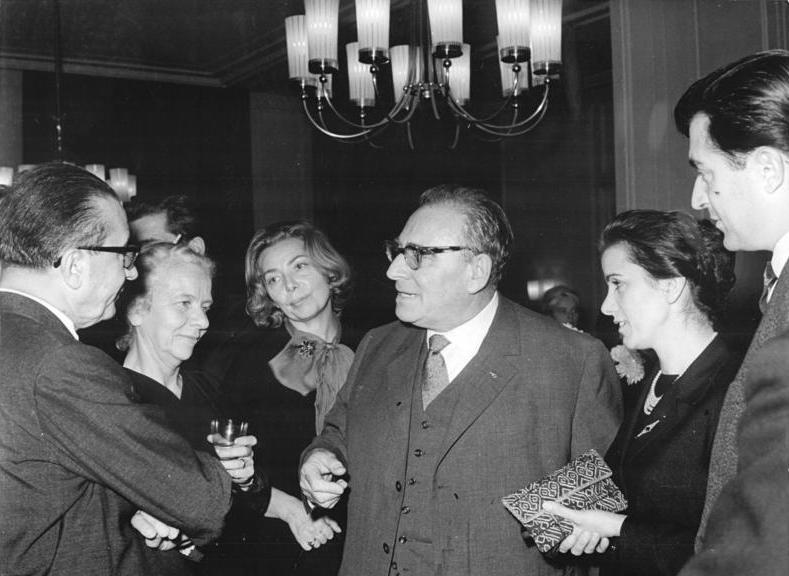
- Dimitris Rontiris (on the left, back to camera) during a visit to East Berlin, 1963
- Born: 1899; Piraeus, Greece
- Died: 20 December 1981 (aged 81–82); Athens, Greece
- Occupations: Actor, director

Dimitris Rontiris (Greek: Δημήτρης Ροντήρης; 1899 – 20 December 1981) was a Greek actor and director.

== Biography ==
Rontiris was born in Piraeus. He began his education at a military school and left to study law at the University of Athens.

He began acting in 1919. Later, he went to Austria to study theatre, art history and ancient Greek philosophy. He later moved on to Berlin, Germany, where he met the director Max Reinhardt.

He returned to Greece and, at the Odeio Theatre he began directing with the musical drama by Kalomiri To daktili tis manas (Το δαχτυλίδι της μάνας, Mother's Ring).

In 1933, he was appointed director of the Royal Theatre and in 1937 he directed a production of Shakespeare's Hamlet, starring Aimilios Veakis, Katina Paxinou, Alexis Minotis, Manos Katrakis. In 1938, he directed a production of Sophocles's Electra.

He was a director at the National Theatre of Greece in Athens from 1946 until 1950 and from 1953 until 1955. He ran the Greek Scene (Ελληνική Σκηνή Elliniki Skini) and the Piraeus Theatre in 1957, where he headlined several productions in many countries across Europe, North and South America and Asia and produced several theatrical shows.

He directed works from classical to modern, including eleven Shakespeare works and other classic tragedies. He staged Electra (Shakespeare) and Hamlet with the Royal Theatre in 1932 in England and Germany.

He acted in the Aeschylus trilogy Oresteia at the Herodes Atticus Odeum in Athens in 1949, presented by the political head of the country, Alexandros Diomidis.
