= Marika Kotopouli Museum =

Art museum in Athens, Greece

Coordinates: 37°58′11.25″N 23°44′27.39″E

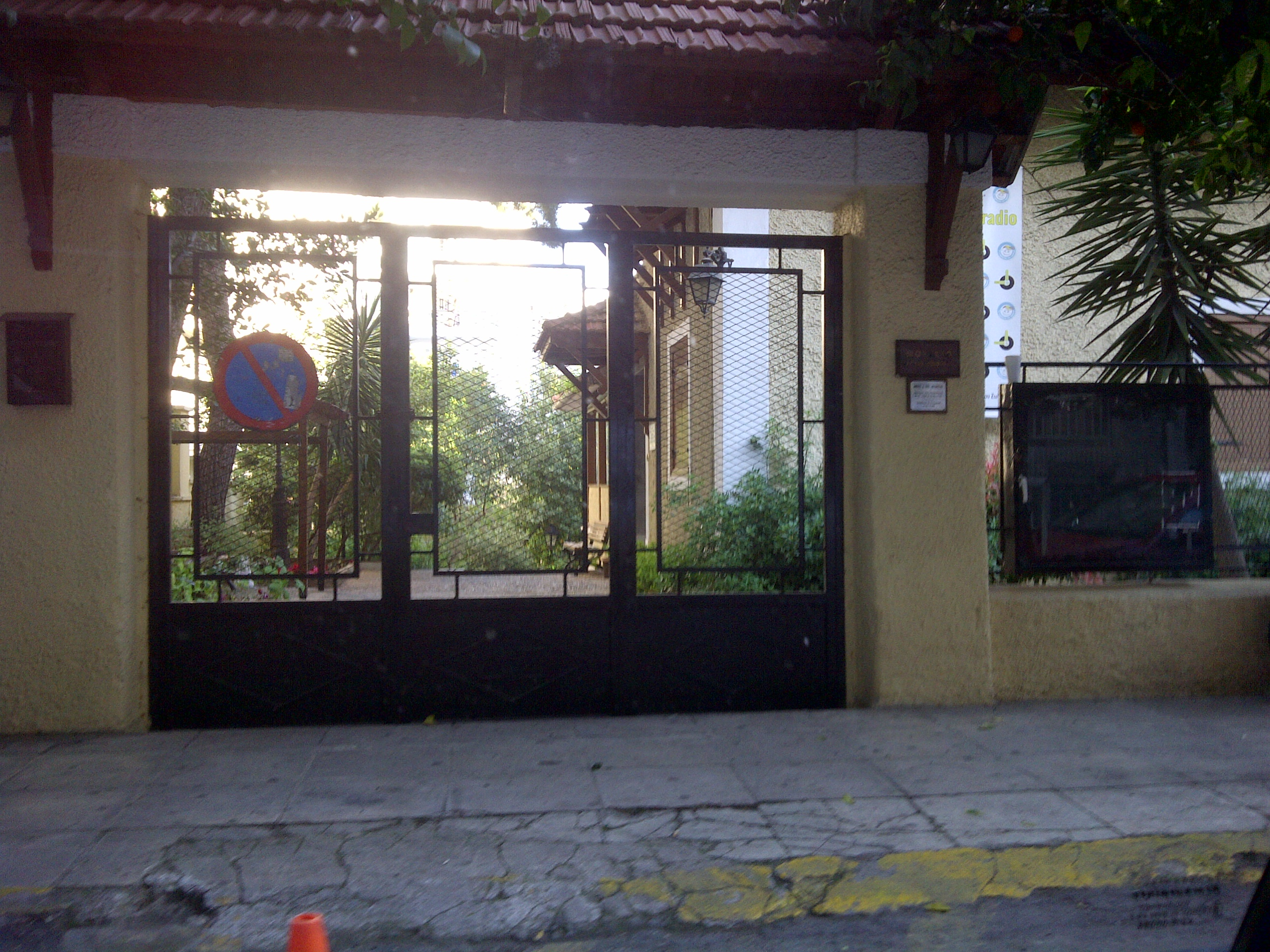
Μouseio Κotopouli entrance at Zografou

The Marika Kotopouli Museum is a modern art museum in Zografou, Athens, Greece. The building housing the museum was built by the famous Greek theater actress Marika Kotopouli (1887–1954) as her holiday home in 1926. During the Second World War, the house was requisitioned by the Germans and after the war it housed the local Police Station. The Zographou Municipality with support of the Association of Greek Actors restored the building with its distinctive architecture and beautiful interiors. In May 1990, it opened to the public as a museum of modern art. It hosts various interim art exhibitions as well as the permanent collection of Konstantinos Ioannides.
