= Theatrical Museum of Greece =

Museum in Athens, Greece

Coordinates: 37°58′54″N 23°44′04″E

The Museum and Study Centre of the Greek Theatre is a museum in Athens, Greece. It was founded by the historian of the Greek Theatre, Yiannis Sideris in 1938.
