= Cybele Andrianou =

Greek actress (1888–1978)

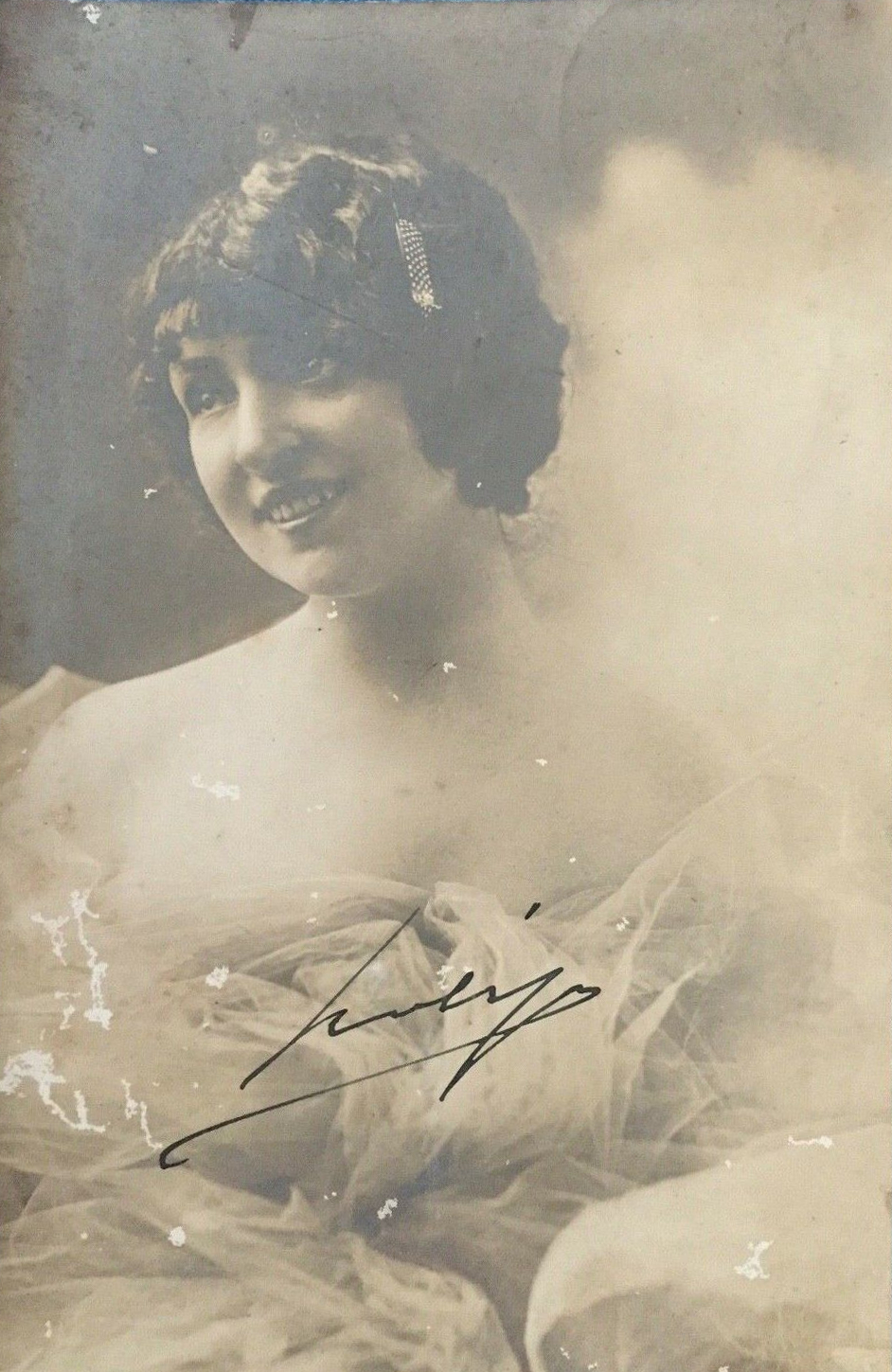
- Born: 13 July 1888; Smyrna, Aidin Vilayet, Ottoman Empire
- Died: 26 May 1978 (aged 89); Athens, Greece
- Occupation: Actress
- Spouses: Mitsos Myrat (m. 1903; div. 1906): Kostas Theodoridis; Georgios Papandreou
- Children: 4 (including Miranda Myrat)

Cybele Andrianou (Greek: Κυβέλη Ανδριανού; 13 July 1888 – 26 May 1978) was a Greek actress.

She was born on 13 July 1888 to an unmarried couple in Smyrna and spent the first two years of her life in an Athens orphanage. At the age of two-and-a-half, she was adopted by Anastasis and Maria Andrianou. The family of a famous Athenian lawyer of the time, who had recently lost their only child, helped Cybele's adoptive parents financially. In 1901, at the age of 13, she received her first award for her stage performance.

There is a statue honouring her in Pagrati Grove, Athens.

== Career ==
Cybele was one of the main actresses of Nea Skini from 1901 to 1906. There, she had the chance to perform the only roles of her life based on ancient Greek tragedy: Euripides' Alcestis and Sophocles' Antigone. She later became known for her performances in plays of Leo Tolstoy, Carlo Goldoni and Henrik Ibsen. In 1908, she worked for the first time with Gregorios Xenopoulos, who wrote her the theatric play The Red Rock (Ο Κόκκινος Βράχος), based his short novel written of the same name. The play was of huge success, and was repeated by Cybele's theatrical group for many years to come. Xenopoulos continued to write her at least one play a year, until 1925. Cybele also worked with Pantelis Horn (the father of Dimitris Horn) from 1910 to 1934. In 1932, she joined forces with Marika Kotopouli, her "stage enemy", in order to compete the newly founded National Theater of Greece. After the German invasion, she fled along with her husband, George Papandreou, and the Greek government and royal family to the Middle East. After the war, she returned in Greece and performed various roles with the National Theater, accompanied by Ellie Lambeti, Dimitris Horn, Mitsos Myrat and other famous actors and actresses. The summer of 1951 she made her only appearance in an ancient Greek comedy, in Aristophanes' Lysistrata. Cybele appeared in only two films during her career, in 1933 and 1956.

== Personal life ==
Cybele's first husband was Mitsos Myrat, with whom she continued to work on stage after their divorce. They had two children: a son, Alexandros "Alekos" and a daughter, Miranda (also rendered as Miranta) (1906-1994). She later married a prominent businessman, Kostas Theodoridis. They had a daughter, Aliki. Her third husband was George Papandreou, later Prime Minister. They had one son, Georgios. When Cybele died, in 1978, at the age of 89, she had 4 children, 3 grandchildren, 6 great grandchildren and 5 great-great grandchildren. Miranda's daughter, Kyveli Theohari, was also an actress. The actress Rita Myrat (née Tarsouli) was her daughter-in-law being the wife of her son Alekos.
