= National Theatre of Greece =

Greek national theater organization

Coordinates: 37°59′05″N 23°43′31″E

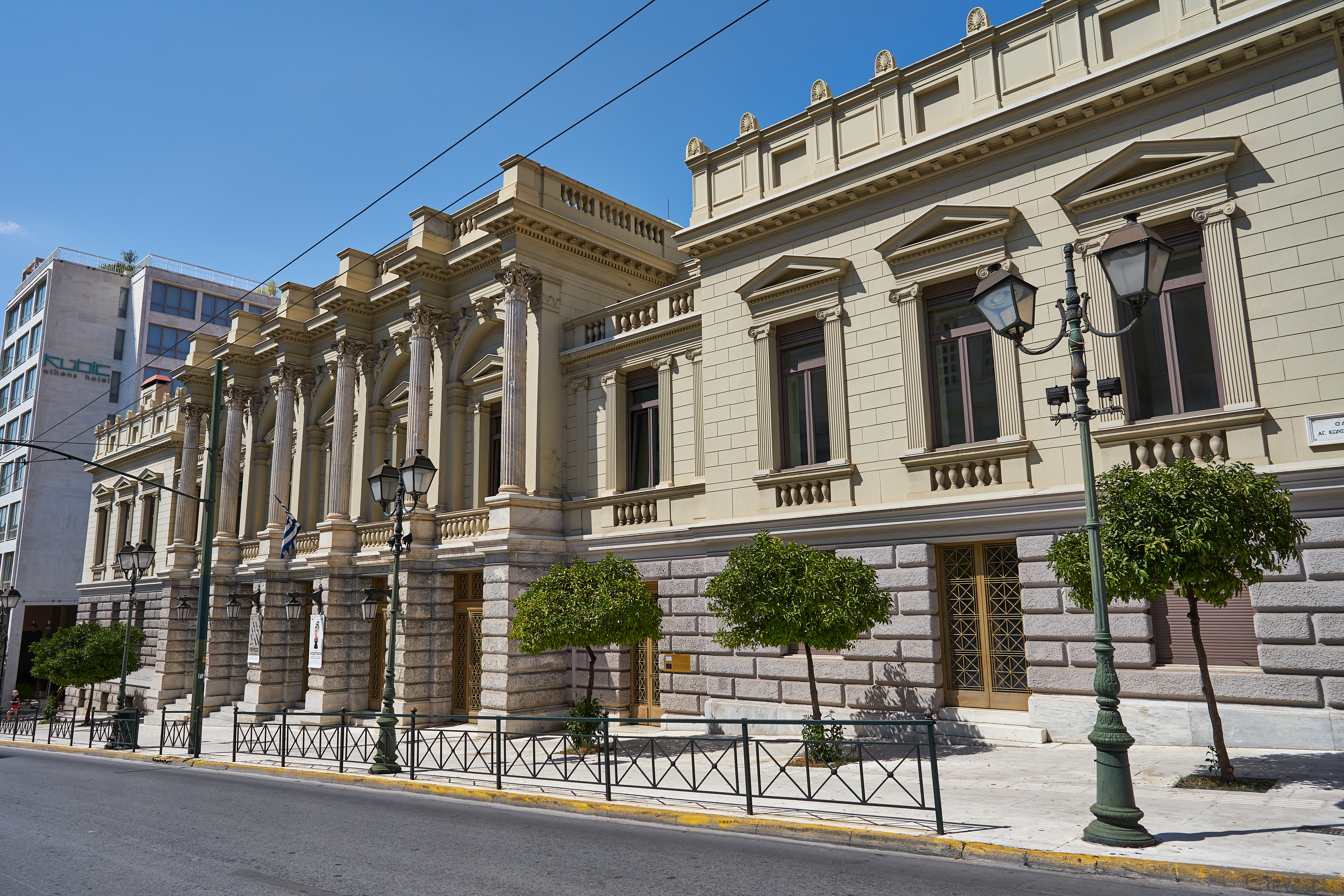
- Predecessor: Royal Theatre of Greece
- Formation: May 3, 1930; 95 years ago
- Founder: Georgios Papandreou
- Type: Non-governmental organization
- Headquarters: Athens, Greece
- Art Director: Argyro Chioti
- Website: n-t.gr

The National Theatre of Greece (Greek: Εθνικό Θέατρο, romanized: Ethnikó Théatro) is based in Athens, Greece.

== History ==
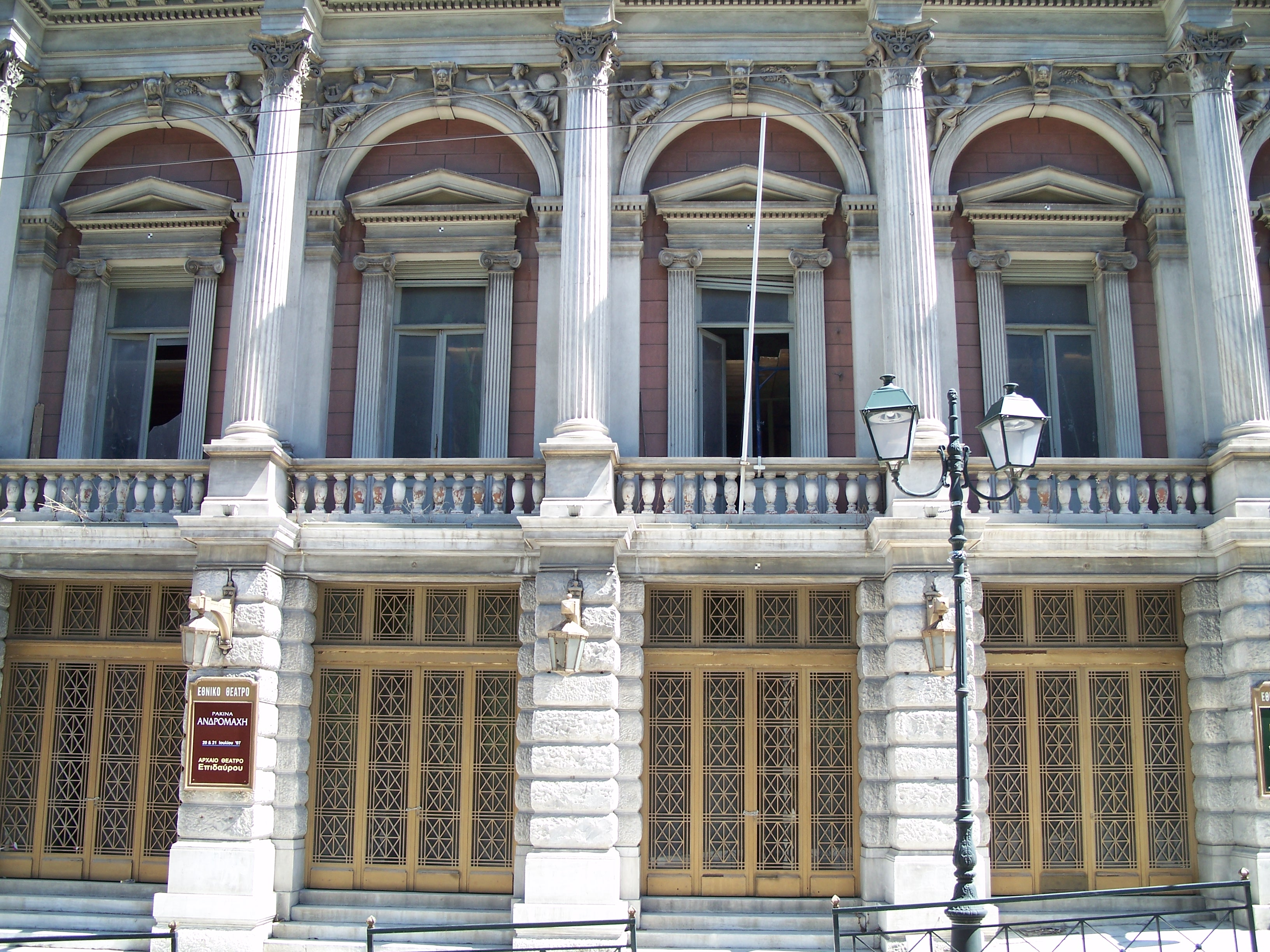
The Central Theatre on Agiou Konstantinou Street.

The first permanent theatre in modern Greece had been the Boukoura Theatre from 1840, but it had difficulty in managing its operation and stood empty for long periods of time. The National Theatre of Greece was decided to be founded in 1880, with a grant from King George I and Efstratios Rallis to give theatre a permanent home in Athens. The foundations for this new project were laid on Agiou Konstantinou Street and the building itself was designed by the famous Saxonian architect noted for many other public buildings in Athens at the time, Ernst Ziller. Despite problems getting the building done in time, it was eventually completed in the late 1890s and in 1900 it was opened as Royal Theatre. Angelos Vlachos was appointed as the Director.

The National Theater began to expand its operations and in 1901 a drama school was opened. The same year, the Royal Theatre opened its doors to the public with a monologue from Dimitris Verardakis' play Maria Dozapatri and two Greek one-act comedies: Dimitris Koromilas' The Death of Pericles and Charalambos Anninos' Servant Required. Following the first performance the theatre began to expand in popularity among Greece's upper and upper middle classes and staged more productions. One of the most famous of the period was Aeschylus' Oresteia, staged in a prose translation by Yorgos Sotiriadis. The production sparked a long linguistic conflict, between the adherents of katharevousa and the modern Demotic Greek. Students from the University of Athens' School of Philosophy, incited by their classicist professor, Yorgos Mistriotis, marched down Agiou Konstantinou in an attempt to halt the performance. The episodes that followed, known as the Oresteiaka, resulted in one death and ten injuries on November 8, 1903.

In 1913, upon the assassination of King George, the Royal Theater was bequeathed to his son, Prince Nicholas of Greece and Denmark, who was a painter and playwright.

The theatre entered into a period of decline, occasionally playing host to foreign theatre companies, until 1932. It remained closed until was re-founded, as National Theatre, under an act of parliament signed by the education minister, Georgios Papandreou, on May 30, 1932. The first plays staged were the Aeschylus' Agamemnon and Gregorios Xenopoulos' comedy O theios Oneiros. The first actor team includes Katina Paxinou, Aimilios Veakis, Eleni Papadaki and Alexis Minotis. First theatrical director was placed Fotos Politis and from 1934 Dimitris Rontiris.

In 1939, the Greek National Opera (Greek: Εθνική Λυρική Σκηνή) was founded as part of the National Theatre.

In 1955, the NT contributed in the foundation of the Epidaurus Festival (as part of the Athens Festival), devoted to the ancient drama.

Notable (general) directors of the NT, through its history, include Ioannis Gryparis, Kostis Bastias, Angelos Terzakis, Yórgos Theotokás, Dimitris Rontiris, Elias Venezis, Alexis Minotis, Nikos Kourkoulos.

== Scenes ==
The National Theatre includes the Central Scene (performs classical repertoire), the New Scene and the Peiramatiki Scene (Experimental). From 1991 there is also the Kotopouli Scene and from 1995 the Paxinou Scene.

== Buildings ==
=== The Central Theatre ===
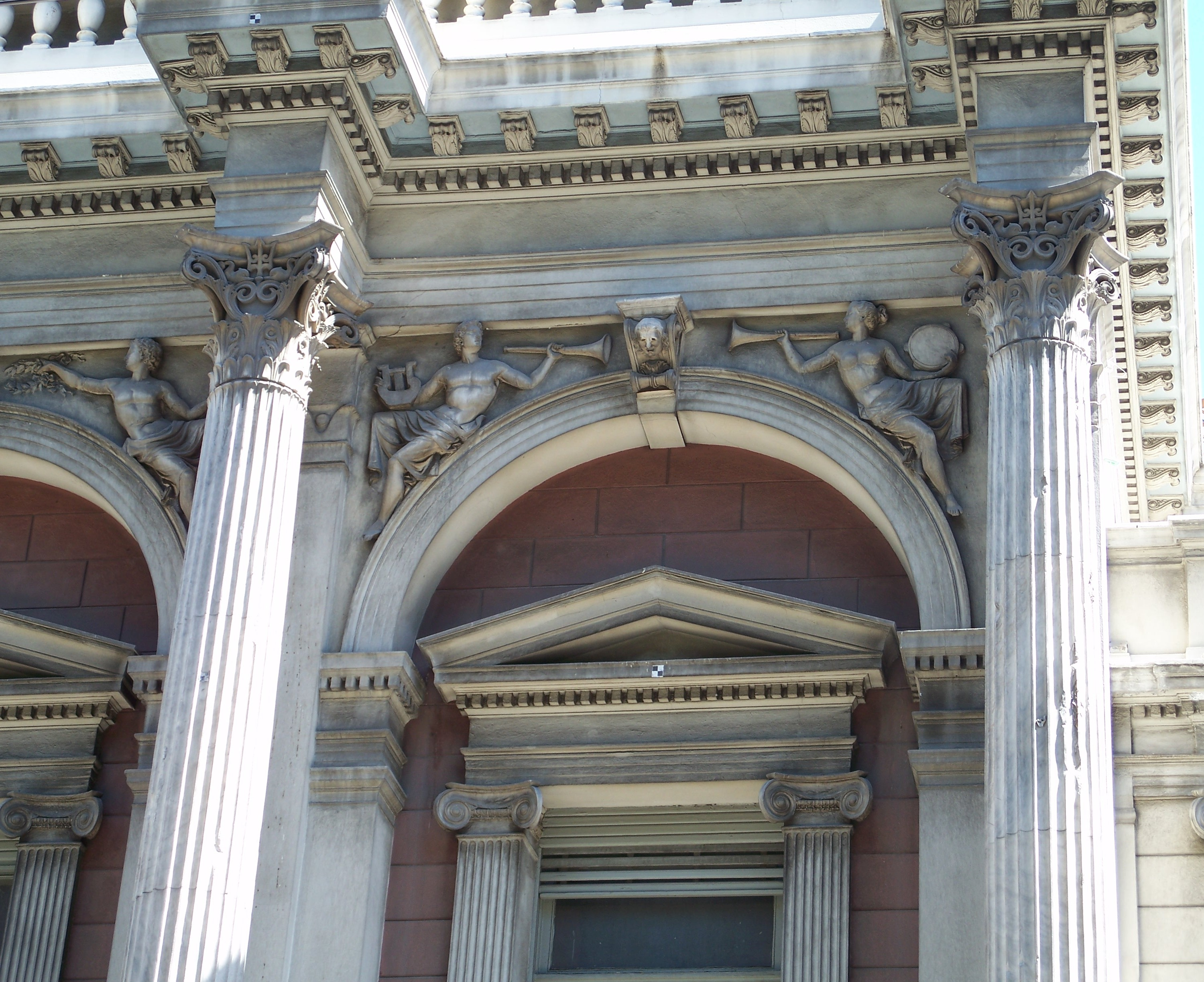
Detail of decoration on Agiou Konstantinou Street, building.

The first home of the National Theatre was commissioned by King George I and designed by the architect Ernst Ziller. It was built between 1895 and 1901. The Royal Theatre occupied the historic neo-classical building on Agiou Konstantinou Street from 1901 to 1908, but went bankrupt and was forced to close. The building was renovated in 1930 and 1931 under the supervision of the set designer Kleovoulos Klonis. Since 1932 the building has been the home of the National's Central Theatre. In 2009, the complete renovation of the building was completed.

=== Children's Theatre ===
The theatre is situated in the basement of the Sikiarideio Hall. It was designed to operate as a music hall, but soon became a cinema. Its ownership was taken over by the Ministry of Culture in 1987, and since 1993 the National Theatre has staged children's productions there.

== Drama School ==
The National Theatre of Greece Drama School (GNT Drama School) was founded in 1930, since when it has operated in tandem with the National Theatre of Greece.
