= Piraeus Municipal Theatre =

Municipal Theatre of Piraeus
- Δημοτικό Θέατρο Πειραιά
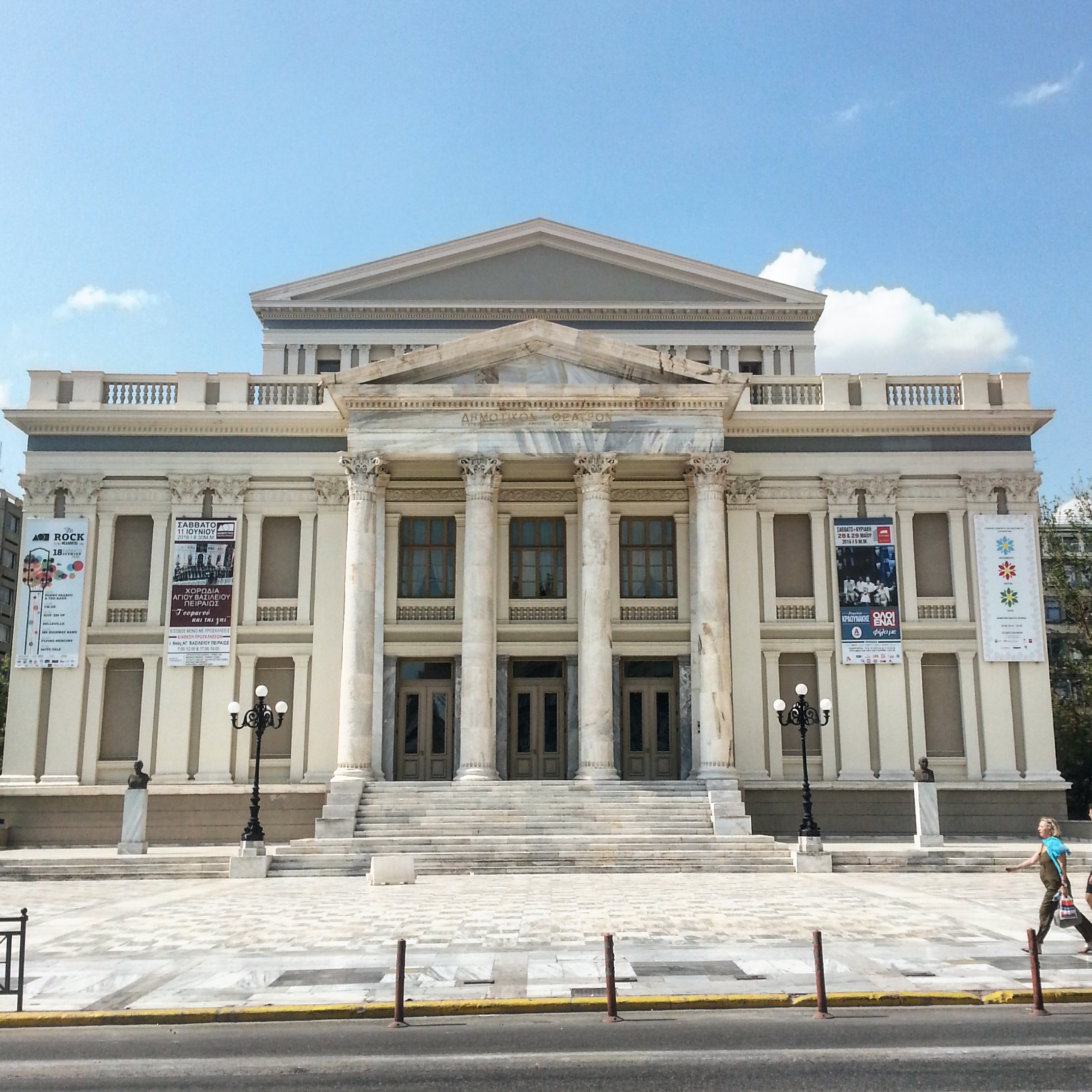
- Piraeus Municipal Theatre

- Location within Piraeus

General information
- Type: Opera house
- Architectural style: Neoclassical
- Location: Piraeus, Ir. Politechniou Avenue 32; Piraeus, Greece
- Coordinates: 37.94342°N 23.64663°E
- Construction started: June 24, 1884; 142 years ago
- Completed: 1895
- Inaugurated: 9 April 1895
- Renovated: 2013
- Cost: 900 thousand Drachmas
- Client: Municipality of Piraeus
- Owner: Municipality of Piraeus

Height
- Height: 30 m (98 ft)

Technical details
- Floor count: 4

Design and construction
- Architect: Ioannis Lazarimos

Other information
- Seating capacity: 600
- Public transit: Athens Metro: Dimotiko Theatro Athens Tram: Dimarcheio

Website
- https://www.dithepi.gr/

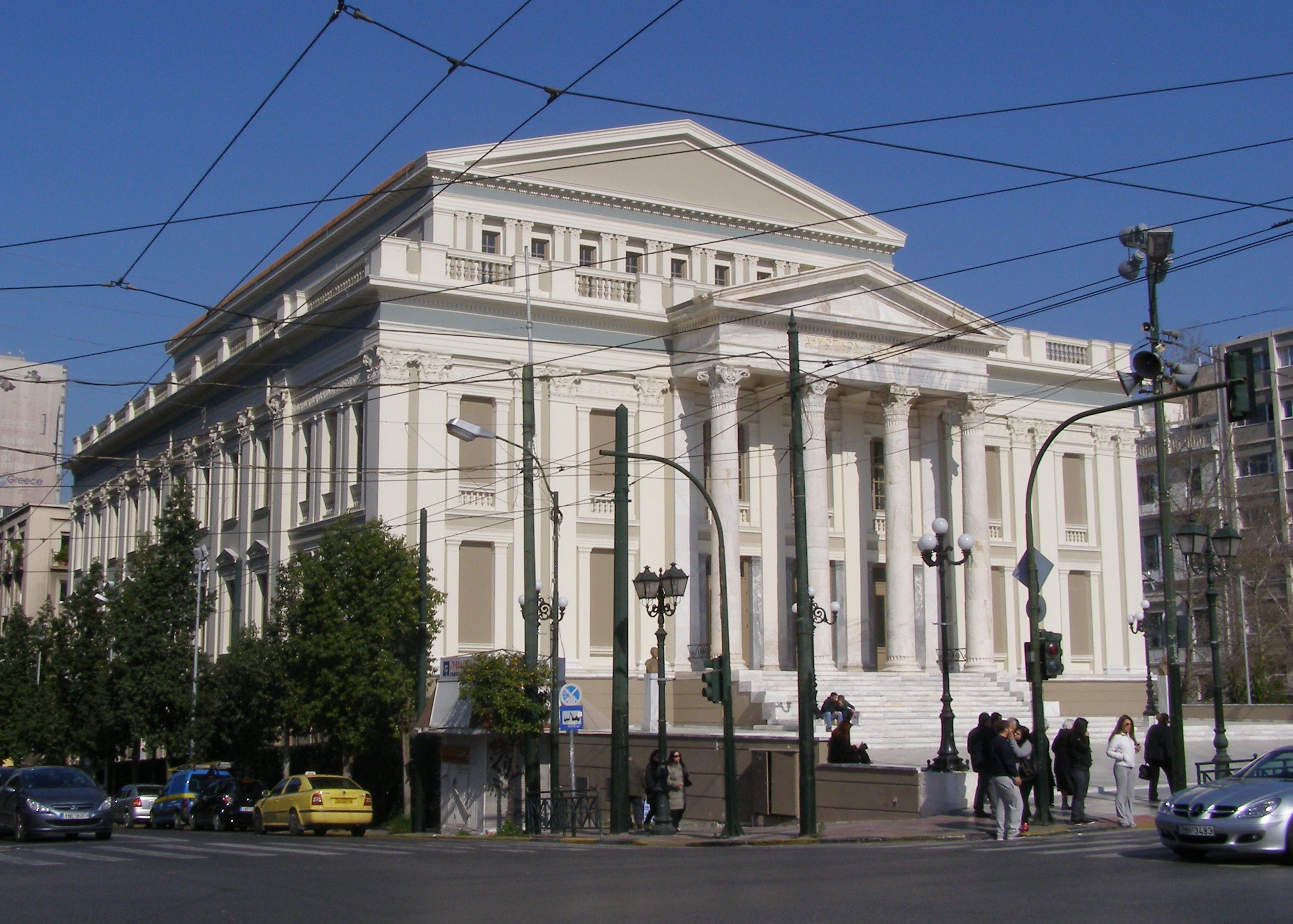
The theater after the restoration, 2013

The Piraeus Municipal Theatre is a neoclassical building built on plans by the architect Ioannis Lazarimos and was opened on 9 April 1895.

The theatre has a 600-seat capacity and is located in the centremost place of Piraeus.
