= Gregorios Xenopoulos =

Greek novelist, journalist and playwright (1867–1951)

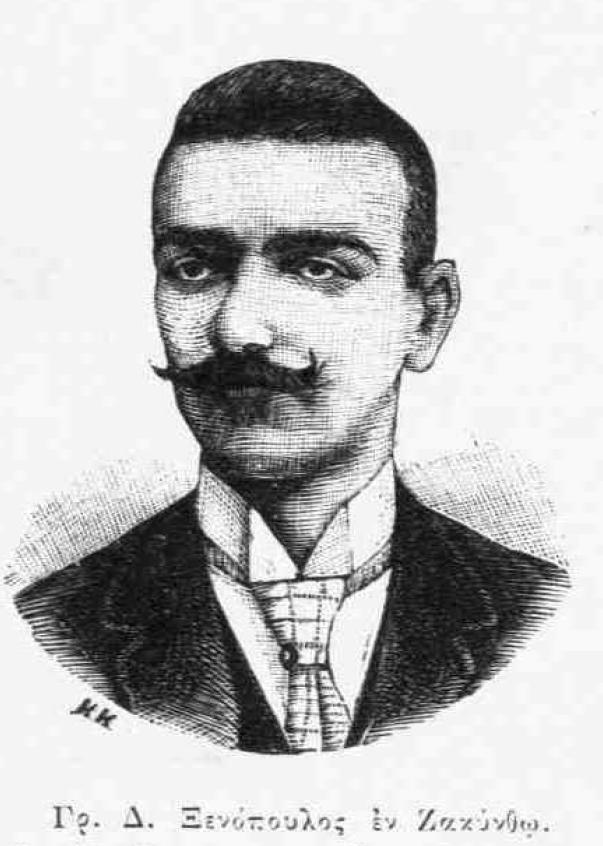
- Born: 9 December 1867; Constantinople, Ottoman Empire
- Died: 14 January 1951 (aged 83); Athens, Greece
- Occupations: Novelist, playwright, journalist
- Writing career
- Genres: Drama, comedy, theatre

Gregorios Xenopoulos (Greek: Γρηγόριος Ξενόπουλος [kseˈnopulos]; 9 December 1867 – 14 January 1951) was a novelist, journalist and playwright from Zakynthos.

He was lead editor in the magazine The Education of Children (Η Διάπλασις των Παίδων) during the period from 1896 to 1948, during which time he was also the magazine's main author. His was the trademark signature "Σας ασπάζομαι, Φαίδων" ("Yours sincerely, Phaedon)", which he used in letters ostensibly addressed to the magazine. He was also the founder and editor of the Nea Estia magazine, which is still published. He became a member of the Academy of Athens in 1931, and founded the Society of Greek Writers (Εταιρεία Ελλήνων Λογοτεχνών) together with Kostis Palamas, Angelos Sikelianos and Nikos Kazantzakis.

== Life ==
He was born on 9 December 1867 in Constantinople. His father, Dionysios, hailed from Zakynthos and his mother, Evlalia came from Constantinople. The family moved to Zakynthos soon after, where Gregorios spent his youth until 1883, when he enrolled in the University of Athens to study physics and mathematics. He never completed his studies: already in the first year, he had begun writing literature, which was his sole source of income at the time.

In 1892 he moved permanently to Athens and in 1894 he married Efrosini Diogenidis. They divorced one and a half years later, having already had a daughter. In 1901 he married his second spouse Christine Kanellopoulos, with whom he had two daughters.

He cooperated with several newspapers and magazines, in which he published many studies, articles, short stories and novels. In 1894 he became director of the Illustrated Estia newspaper and in 1896 the chief editor of The Education of the Children. From 1901 to 1912 he published literary works and studies in the Panathinaia, and from 1912 he cooperated with Ethnos newspaper, writing serialized novels. In 1927 he founded the magazine Nea Estia, whose director he was until 1934.

His house, including his library, was destroyed during the Dekemvriana clashes in Athens in 1944. He died in Athens on 14 January 1951 and was buried at public expense.

== Works ==
=== Prose ===
Xenopoulos was a prolific writer. He wrote over 80 novels and a large number of short stories. He first became known to the literary world through his first novel: "Ο Άνθρωπος του Κόσμου" (O anthropos tou kosmou, "Man of the world"). This novel and his next one, "Nikolas Sigalos" (1890), written in the New Athenian style, were not successful. He then turned for inspiration to his birthplace, Zakynthos, and as a result wrote some of his best novels, such as "Magaret Stefa" (1893) and Κόκκινος Βράχος (Kokkinos Vrachos, "Red Rock", 1905). These were followed by further novels in the New Athenian style: "Ο πόλεμος" (O polemos, "War", 1914), "Οι Μυστικοί Αρραβώνες" (I mystikoi aravones, "The Secret Engagement", 1915) and the Ionian School novel "Laura" (1915), which was also one of his most admired. But his most ambitious work was the trilogy: "Πλούσιοι και φτωχοί" (plousioi kai ftochoi, "The Rich and the Poor", 1919), "Τίμιοι και άτιμοι" (Timioi kai atimoi, "The Honest and the Dishonest", 1921), "Τυχεροί και άτυχοι" (Tycheroi kai atychoi, "The Lucky and the Unlucky", 1924). Other novels include: "Αναδυομένη" (Anadyomeni, 1923), "Ισαβέλλα" (Isabella, 1923), "Τερέζα Βάρμα-Δακόστα" (Teresa Varma-Dakosta, 1925).

His novels are set in Athens and Zakynthos, and he is considered to be a proponent of the "urban novel". The main theme of his works is love, particularly love between people of different classes. His work has been criticised for putting quantity ahead of quality, with many sequels, and for pandering to the tastes of his readers with scenes which were sexually provocative for the period. However he has also been praised for his narrative strength and ability to hold the readers attention.

=== Theatrical ===
His first theatrical play was: "Ο ψυχοπατέρας" (O Psychopateras, "The Stepfather"), which was first performed in 1895. He cooperated with the "Nea Skini" theatrical troupe of Konstantinos Christomanos. His most famous theatrical plays are: "Το μυστικό της Κοντέσσας Βαλέραινας" (To mystiko tis kontessas Valerainas, "The Secret of Countess Valerena", 1904), "Στέλλα Βιολάντη" (Stella Violanti, 1909, with Marika Kotopouli), "Φοιτηταί", (Foititai, "Students").

In all he wrote 46 theatrical plays. In 1901 he played a leading part with Kostis Palamas in establishing the theatre "Nea Skini" and because of his fluency in many languages, he was aware of important intellectual developments in major European countries at that time. In addition, he wrote introductions for Henrik Ibsen. He also produced many translations.

His first play to be performed at the Royal Theatre of Athens (renamed after renovation in 1932 as the National Theatre of Greece) was "Ο θείος Όνειρος" (O theios Oneiros, "Uncle Dream").

=== Categories of works ===
He wrote dramas and comedies with the common subject, love. His work is a window into contemporary Greek society. His works are categorized by the place that they were written, some in Zakynthos and the rest in Athens. His work tried to find a balance between the Ionian School and the New Athenian School.

- Zakynthian: "Stella Violanti", "Rachil", "Fotini Saranti", "O popolaros", "The secret of Contessa Valeriana".
- Athenian: "Foititai", "Psychosavvato", "To anthropino".

=== Literary criticism ===
Xenopoulos is notable for his literary criticism. In the magazine "Panathinaia" ("Παναθήναια"), he published a lot of reviews of famous Greek writers, such as Alexandros Papadiamantis, Demetrius Vikelas etc. In 1903 he was the first to introduce Constantine P. Cavafy to the Athenian readership.

== Sources ==
- Apostolos Sachinis, To neoelliniko mythistorima, Galaxias ed., Athens 1971.
