= Marika Kotopouli =

Greek actress (1887–1954)

- Born: 3 May 1887; Athens, Greece
- Died: 11 September 1954 (aged 67); Athens, Greece
- Occupation: Actress
- Spouse: Georgios Chelmis (m. 1923)

Marika Kotopouli (Greek: Μαρίκα Κοτοπούλη [kotoˈpuli]; 3 May 1887 – 11 September 1954) was a Greek stage actress during the first half of the 20th century.

== Biography ==
Kotopouli was born on 3 May 1887 in Athens to actor parents, Dimitrios Kotopoulis and his wife, Eleni. Marika's first stage appearance came during one of their tours, in the play "The Coachman of the Alps". She made her official debut in the Royal Theatre in 1903, before going to Paris in 1906 for theatrical studies. From 1908, she had her own troupe, and theatre, the "Kotopouli Theatre". In this period she developed an intense artistic rivalry with another young actress, Cybele. The two had very devoted fans, and during the National Schism, their rivalry acquired political overtones also: whilst Cybele was favoured by the Venizelists, Kotopouli became a symbol of the royalist camp. In 1912 Kotopouli also had a personal love relationship with Ion Dragoumis, who became a major opponent of the Venizelists and was eventually assassinated. Kotopouli and Cybele collaborated in joint productions from 1932–1934 and again from 1950-52.

She married Georgios Chelmis in 1923. Later, with Spyros Melas and Dimitris Myrat, she co-founded and participated in the "Free Scene" (Ελεύθερη Σκηνή, June 1929 to spring 1930), before embarking on a tour of the United States. In 1933, she played in her only movie, the Greek-Turkish production Bad Road, based on a novel by Grigorios Xenopoulos. A new theatre, the Rex, was built specifically for her troupe in Panepistimiou Street in central Athens in 1936. It still stands, as the Rex/Kotopouli theatre, and functions as a branch of the National Theatre of Greece. Her repertoire included many classic plays, both ancient Greek and modern ones, ranging from Aeschylus to Goethe and Ibsen.

== Death ==
Her final appearance was in Syros on 24 March 1953. Kotopouli died on 11 September 1954, aged 67, in her native Athens, from undisclosed causes. She received a state funeral.

== Honours and legacy ==
- Gold Cross of the Order of George I in 1921 (with the Education Ministry's Arts and Letters Prize in 1923)
- Marika Kotopouli Award (founded in 1951 to honour Greek actors)
- Her home in Zografou was converted into the Marika Kotopouli Museum, which opened in 1990 and features exhibitions of modern art.
