= List of Greek films of the 1950s =

A list of notable films produced in Greece in the 1950s.

== 1950s ==
Title	Director	Cast	Genre	Notes
1950
The Drunkard (Ο μεθύστακας)	Yorgos Javellas	Orestis Makris, Dimitris Horn, Nikos Rizos	Drama	IMDb
The Last Mission (Teleftaia apostoli, Τελευταία αποστολή)	Nikos Tsiforos	Smaroula Υiouli, Nikos Tzogias	War	Entered into the 1951 Cannes Film Festival IMDb
1951
Dead City (Nekri Politeia, Νεκρή πολιτεία)	Frixos Iliadis	Irene Papas, Nikos Tzogias, Eleni Zafeiriou, Christina Kalogerikou	Drama	Entered into the 1952 Cannes Film Festival IMDb
1953
1954
Madame X (I Agnostos, Η άγνωστος)	Orestis Laskos	Cybele, Alekos Alexandrakis, Labros Konstadaras, Mimis Fotopoulos, Periklis Hristoforidis, Eleni Zafeiriou	Drama	IMDb
Windfall in Athens (Kyriakatiko xypnima, Κυριακάτικο Ξύπνημα)	Michael Cacoyannis	Ellie Lambeti, Dimitris Horn, Giorgos Pappas, Tasso Kavadia	Romantic comedy	Entered into the 1954 Cannes Film Festival IMDb
Oute gata oute zimia	Alekos Sakellarios	Vassilis Logothetidis, Ilya Livykou	Comedy	
To pontikaki	Nikos Tsiforos	Aliki Vougiouklaki	Police	
1955
Stella (Στέλλα)	Michael Cacoyannis	Melina Mercouri, Giorgos Fountas, Alekos Alexandrakis, Christina Kalogerikou, Voula Zouboulaki, Dionysis Papagiannopoulos, Tasso Kavadia	Romantic drama	Won Golden Globe, +1 nomination at the 1955 Cannes Film Festival; Selected as one of the 10 best Greek films by Greek Film Critics Association
Istoria mias kalpikis liras (Κάλπικη λίρα)	Yorgos Javellas	Vassilis Logothetidis, Ellie Lambeti, Dimitris Horn, Ilya Livykou, Mimis Fotopoulos, Sperantza Vrana, Orestis Makris	Drama	Selected as one of the 10 best Greek films by Greek Film Critics Association
Thanassakis o politevomenos (Θανασάκης ο Πολιτευόμενος)	Alekos Sakellarios	Dinos Iliopoulos, Anna Synodinou, Joly Garbi	Comedy	IMDb
Magic City (Magiki Polis, Μαγική Πόλις)	Nikos Koundouros	Giorgos Fountas, Margarita Papageorgiou, Thanasis Veggos	Drama	IMDb
Ena votsalo sti limni (Ένα βότσαλο στη λίμνη)	Alekos Sakellarios	Vassilis Logothetidis, Ilya Livykou	Comedy	IMDb
Joe, o tromeros (Τζο ο τρομερός)	Dinos Dinopoulos	Dinos Iliopoulos, Margarita Papageorgiou, Christos Tsaganeas, Nikos Rizos, Dionyssis Papayannopoulos, Pantelis Zervos	Comedy	IMDb
1956
Drakos, O (Ο Δράκος)	Nikos Koundouros	Dinos Iliopoulos, Giannis Argyris, Thanasis Veggos	Drama	Selected as one of the 10 best Greek films by Greek Film Critics Association
A Girl in Black (To Koritsi me ta mavra, Το Κορίτσι με τα Μαύρα)	Michael Cacoyannis	Ellie Lambeti, Dimitris Horn	Drama	Won Golden Globe and entered into the 1956 Cannes Film Festival IMDb
I Arpagi tis Persefonis (Η Αρπαγή της Περσεφόνης)	Grigoris Grigoriou	Aleka Katselli, Vasilis Diamantopoulos, Orestis Makris	Romantic comedy	IMDb
O ziliarogatos	Yorgos Javellas	Vassilis Logothetidis, Ilya Livykou	Comedy	
1957
The Girl from Corfu (Protevousianikes peripeteies, Πρωτευουσιάνικες περιπέτειες)	Yannis Petropoulakis			Entered into the 7th Berlin International Film Festival
A Matter of Dignity (To Telefteo psema, Το τελευταίο ψέμα)	Michael Cacoyannis	Ellie Lambeti, Eleni Zafeiriou	Drama	Nominated for BAFTA and entered into the 1958 Cannes Film Festival. IMDb
Maria Pentagiotissa (Μαρία Πενταγιώτισσα)	Kostas Andritsos	Aliki Vougiouklaki, Andreas Barkoulis, Labros Konstadaras	Romantic drama	IMDb
The Auntie from Chicago (Η θεία απ' το Σικάγο)	Alekos Sakellarios	Georgia Vasileiadou, Orestis Makris, Eleni Zafeiriou, Tzeni Karezi	Comedy	IMDb
1958
We Have Only One Life (Mia zoi tin echoume, Μια ζωή την έχουμε)	Yorgos Javellas	Yvonne Sanson, Dimitris Horn, Vasilis Avlonitis, Christos Tsaganeas	Comedy	Top IMDb ratings - IMDb
Oi paranomoi	Nikos Koundouros			Entered into the 8th Berlin International Film Festival
The Lake of Thinking	Giorgos Zervos	Tzeni Karezi	Drama	
1959
Astero (Αστέρω)	Dinos Dimopoulos	Aliki Vougiouklaki, Titos Vandis	Romantic drama	Entered into the 9th Berlin International Film Festival
Stournara 288 (Στουρνάρα 288)	Dinos Dimopoulos	Orestis Makris, Smaroula Yiouli, Dionysis Papagiannopoulos	Drama	IMDb
thisavros tou makariti, O (Ο θησαυρός του μακαρίτη)	Nikos Tsiforos	Georgia Vasileiadou, Vasilis Avlonitis, Nikos Rizos, Xenia Kalogeropoulou, Stefanos Lineos	Comedy	IMDb
Maiden's Cheek (Το Ξύλο βγήκε από τον Παράδεισο)	Alekos Sakellarios	Aliki Vougiouklaki, Dimitris Papamichael, Christos Tsaganeas, Dionysis Papagiannopoulos, Orestis Makris	Comedy	IMDb
Bouboulina	Kostas Andritsos	Irene Papas	Historic Drama	
Bloody Twilight; Matomeno iliovasilemma	Andreas Labrinos			Entered into the 1959 Cannes Film Festival
