= The Dodger (film) =

1971 Greek film

- Greek: Ο κατεργάρης
- Directed by: Giannis Dalianidis
- Written by: Giannis Dalianidis
- Based on: Parti gia neous (Youth Party) by Nikos Tsiforos
- Produced by: Finos Film
- Starring: Chronis Exarhakos; Nora Valsami; Giannis Mihalopoulos; Spyros Kalogirou; Katerina Gioulaki
- Cinematography: Lefteris Siaskas
- Music by: Mimis Plessas
- Distributed by: Finos Film
- Release date: 5 April 1971
- Running time: 88 minutes
- Country: Greece
- Language: Greek

The Dodger (Greek: Ο κατεργάρης, "the Rascal") is a 1971 Greek film directed and written by Giannis Dalianidis and starring Chronis Exarhakos, Nora Valsami, Giannis Mihalopoulos, Spyros Kalogirou and Katerina Gioulaki. The movie is based on the play Parti gia neous (Πάρτι για νέους) or Youth Party by Nikos Tsiforos. It was the last film by Finos Film to be made in black and white and the only that starred Chronis Exarhakos. The movie sold 157,614 tickets in its run.

== Cast ==
- Chronis Exarhakos ..... Chronis Varnis
- Nora Valsami ..... Eva Varni
- Giannis Mihalopoulos ..... Miltos Kladaras
- Spyros Kalogirou ..... Ploutarhos Varnis
- Katerina Gioulaki ..... Toula Varni
- Nasos Kedrakas ...... Thrasyvoulos Traganopoulos
- Vasilis Tsivilikas ..... Mihalis Psarelis
- Kaiti Imbrohori ..... Litsa
