= Oi kyries tis avlis =

- Directed by: Dinos Dimopoulos
- Written by: Dimitris Giannoukakis
- Starring: Dinos Iliopoulos; Alekos Alexandrakis; Nora Valsami; Dionyssis Papayannopoulos; Eleni Prokopiou; Floreta Zana; Costas Prekas; Antigoni Koukouli; Katerina Yioulaki; Tasos Giannopoulos; Babis Anthopoulos; Mairi Lalopoulou; Evita Iliopoulou
- Cinematography: Nikos Dimopoulos
- Music by: Mimis Plessas
- Distributed by: Finos Films
- Release date: 1967
- Running time: 104 minutes
- Country: Greece
- Language: Greek

Oi kyries tis avlis (Greek: Οι κυρίες της αυλής/ English: Ladies of the Courtyard) is a 1966 Greek film based on the theatrical play To ekto patoma (Το έκτο πάτωμα = The Next Step). It was made into a movie following the success of the play with Dinos Iliopoulos in 1964 and 1965 at the Gloria Theatre.

The movie was filmed in 1966 by Finos Films and sold 338,081 tickets. The film was directed by Dinos Dimopoulos, a student of Iliopoulos at the Dramatic school. Dinos Iliopoulis was rewarded 90,000 drachmas for his role, a high fee at the time.

== Cast ==
- Dinos Iliopoulos ..... Pipis Kathistos
- Alekos Alexandrakis ..... Nikos Alexiou
- Nora Valsami ..... Anna Bosikou
- Dionysis Papagiannopoulos ..... Nondas Bosikos
- Eleni Prokopiou ..... Nitsa
- Katerina Yioulaki ..... Paraskevi
- Kostas Prekas ..... Tasos
- Floreta Zana ..... Melita Komninou
- Mary Lalopoulou ..... Eleni Kathistou
- Dimitris Bislanis ..... club owner

== See also ==
- List of Greek films
