= Bitter Bread =

- Directed by: Grigoris Grigoriou
- Written by: Grigoris Grigoriou; Inta Hristinaki]
- Produced by: Panagiotis Dadiras
- Cinematography: Joseph Hepp; Emmanouil Tzanetis
- Edited by: Emil Provelengios
- Music by: Arghyris Kounadis
- Production company: Olympia Film
- Release date: December 17, 1951
- Running time: 83 minutes
- Country: Greece
- Language: Greek

Bitter Bread (Greek: Pikro psomi) is a 1951 Greek drama film directed by Grigoris Grigoriou and starring Eleni Zafeiriou, Inta Hristinaki and Michalis Nikolopoulos.

== Cast ==
- Eleni Zafeiriou as Mrs. Lyberi
- Inta Hristinaki as Louiza
- Michalis Nikolopoulos as Thanasis Lyberis
- Alkis Papas as Antonis Lyberis
- Stratis Floros as Giangos Lyberis
- Nikos Pantelidis as Arhontas
- Alekos Kouris as Fotakis Lyberis
- Dimos Starenios as Employer
- Giorgos Nezos]
- Pantelis Zervos as Foreman
- Sofia Arseni
- Kimon Spathopoulos
- Giorgos Mesalas
- Andreas Lohaitis
- Manos Faratzian
- Evgenios Spatharis as Shadow Theatre Artist (voice)
- Giorgos Foundas as Giangos Lyberis
- Yiorgos Stavrakakis

== Bibliography ==
- Vrasidas Karalis. A History of Greek Cinema. A&C Black, 2012.
