= Mermaids and Rascals =

Mermaids and rascals
- Film poster
- Greek: Γοργόνες και Μάγκες
- Directed by: Giannis Dalianidis
- Written by: Giannis Dalianidis
- Produced by: Finos Film
- Starring: Mary Chronopoulou
- Cinematography: Nikos Dimopoulos
- Edited by: Petros Lykas
- Music by: Mimis Plessas
- Production company: Finos Film
- Release date: 2 December 1968
- Running time: 92 minutes
- Country: Greece
- Language: Greek

Mermaids and Rascals, also found as "Mermaids for love" (greek title:"Γοργόνες κα μάγκες" - transcr.: Gorgones kai Magkes) is a Greek 1968 musical film. The director and screenwriter was Yannis Dalianidis, while the music of the film is by Mimis Plessas.

== Plot ==
When a Swiss property developer is rumoured to be interested in a pristine Greek island, two competing entrepreneurs from Athens rush to the island to buy land and flip it for profit; Petros, a race-car driver, and Flora, a night-club owner. The island's grande-dame and her grandson, Iasonas, urge the locals not to sell their land to speculators; in the end the Swiss lose interest in the island. Flora and Iason fall in love and on their going-away party Petros reconnects with Marina, an island girl he abandoned after the business venture failed.

Even though it's a musical comedy, the film has references to ancient Greek tragedy and contains elements from it such as a chorus.

== Cast ==
- Mary Chronopoulou ..... Flora
- Phaedon Georgitsis ..... Petros Athanasiou
- Martha Karagianni ..... Marina
- Nora Valsami ..... Chryssa, Nikolas's fiancée
- Giannis Vogiatzis ..... Panagis
- Lakis Komninos ..... Iasonas
- Dionysis Papagiannopoulos ..... Petros's dad
- Chronis Exarhakos ..... Gripis
- Maria Foka ..... Grande Dame
- Vangelis Seilinos ..... Nikolas
- Christos Doxaras ..... Dimitros
- Kia Bozou ..... Petros's friend
- Mary Halkia ..... Petros's friend

== Release ==
The film premiered in Greece on 2 December 1968.
