= Loxantra =

- Genre: Social; Drama
- Based on: Loxantra by Maria Iordanidou
- Written by: Christos Doxaras
- Directed by: Grigoris Grigoriou
- Theme music composer: Eleni Karaindrou
- Country of origin: Greece
- Original language: Greek
- No. of seasons: 1
- No. of episodes: 30

Production
- Producer: Rania Dimopoulou
- Running time: 42-45 minutes
- Production company: Astir TV

Original release
- Network: ERT
- Release: January 19 – August 16, 1980

Loxantra is a Greek social drama television series that was filmed and broadcast in the 1979-1980 season, based on the book of the same name by Maria Iordanidou. A total of 30 episodes were broadcast, from January 19 to August 16, 1980, by ERT. It was one of the last series produced in black-and-white. At the same time, it is one of the oldest series preserved in the ERT archive.

== Plot ==
It is the story of the Polis Loxantra from her marriage to her old age. Loxantra marries a widower with four children, Dimitros, at an advanced age. She raises children, marries them, emigrates, grows old, and through her story the history of the entire world of Polis unfolds, through the events that marked it before World War I.

== Cast ==
- Mpety Valasi as Loxantra
- Giannis Argyris as Dimitros
- Panos Chatzikoutselis as Alekakis
- Vasilis Mavromatis as Epameinontas
- Maria Marmarinou as Elegaki
- Giorgos Kyritsis as Theodoros
- Loukas Metaxas as Theodoros (young)
- Anna Gerali as Agatho
- Alekos Mavridis as Tarnanas
- Niki Pazarentzou as Soultana
- Anthi Andreopoulou as Kleio
- Alberto Eskenazi as Giorgakis (First sailor)
- Giannis Thomas as Manolios
- Panos Panopoulos as Andreikos (Mpempekas)
- Sofoklis Peppas as Giorgos
