= Heaven Is Ours =

1953 film by Dinos Dimopoulos

- Directed by: Dinos Dimopoulos
- Written by: Dinos Dimopoulos; Dario Niccodemi (play)
- Starring: Antigoni Valakou; Aleka Katselli; Alekos Alexandrakis
- Cinematography: Aristeidis Karydis-Fuchs
- Edited by: Dinos Katsouridis
- Music by: Manos Hatzidakis
- Production company: Finos Film
- Distributed by: Finos Film
- Release date: 7 December 1953
- Running time: 102 minutes
- Country: Greece
- Language: Greek

Heaven Is Ours (Greek: Oi ouranoi einai dikoi mas) is a 1953 Greek drama film directed by Dinos Dimopoulos and starring Antigoni Valakou, Aleka Katselli and Alekos Alexandrakis.

== Cast ==
- Antigoni Valakou as Spourgitaki
- Aleka Katselli as Gianna Varlamou
- Alekos Alexandrakis as Tonis Varentis
- Labros Konstadaras as Thanos Varlamos
- Niki Alatsatianou as Spourgitaki
- Sofia Arseni
- Giorgos Gioldasis
- Nikos Kazis
- Errikos Kontarinis
- Athanasia Moustaka as Grandmother
- Despina Panayotidou
- Kostas Papahristos
- Ioulietta Sotiraki as Lena Vouraki
- Koulis Stoligas as Customer
- Kostas Strantzalis
- Thanasis Tzeneralis as Commander
- Giorgos Tzifos
- Giorgos Vlahopoulos
- Nikos Fermas as Snitch

== Bibliography ==
- Achilleas Hadjikyriacou. Masculinity and Gender in Greek Cinema: 1949-1967. Bloomsbury Publishing, 2013.
