= Jenny Jenny =

1966 film by Dinos Dimopoulos

- Directed by: Dinos Dimopoulos
- Starring: Tzeni Karezi; Dionysis Papagiannopoulos
- Release date: 21 February 1966
- Running time: 1h 43min
- Country: Greece
- Language: Greek

Jenny Jenny (Greek: Τζένη Τζένη) is a 1966 Greek comedy film directed by Dinos Dimopoulos.

== Cast ==
- Tzeni Karezi - Jenny Skoutari
- Dionysis Papagiannopoulos - Kosmas Skoutaris
- Andreas Barkoulis - Nikos Mantas
- Mary Lalopoulou - Diana Kassandri
- Eleni Zafeiriou - Matina Skoutari
- Dimitris Kallivokas - Andreas Dermezis
- Nana Skiada - Clara Karypi
- Lambros Konstantaras - Miltos Kassandris
- Athinodoros Prousalis - coachman
