= To Retire =

- Genre: Comedy
- Created by: Giannis Dalianidis
- Written by: Giannis Dalianidis
- Directed by: Giannis Dalianidis
- Starring: Katerina Gioulaki
- Country of origin: Greece
- Original language: Greek
- No. of seasons: 2
- No. of episodes: 84

Production
- Producer: Dimitris Tsempelis
- Production locations: Athens, Greece
- Running time: 32-52 minutes

Original release
- Network: Mega Channel
- Release: September 19, 1990 – July 6, 1992

To Retire (English: The Penthouse) is a Greek sitcom series that aired from 1990 to 1992 on the Greek channel Mega. It was written and directed by Giannis Dalianidis.

== Plot ==
In a penthouse in a small-town neighborhood of Athens, lives Katerina, her mother Sofia and her niece, Eirini. Katerina is a hyperactive, active and slightly neurotic woman. She works for the company "Cosmos Ltd.: Advertising-Television Broadcasting-Public Relations". Katerina generally faces problems in her relationships with people, which are mainly caused by her eccentric character.

Her friends call her "crazy", but some minor outbursts are probably justified by the absurdities of everyday life. The main causes that disturb Katerina's nerves are the reactions of her mother and niece to her relationship with the pharmacist Christos and the negative attitude of his sister on the same issue.

Eleni, a young and beautiful girl who meets Iason and falls in love, also works at "Cosmos Ltd.: Advertising-Television Broadcasting-Public Relations". The characters that frame the story are Jason's "classic Greek" mother, Eleni's friend, Charoula, the all-around coffee shop owner Foivos, and many other simple everyday heroes.

== Characters ==
The main character is Katerina Sofianou. Katerina is a divorced, nervous lady that lives with her mother Sofia and her niece Eirini. She wants to get married again but her family does not like the groom.

Actor	Character
Katerina Gioulaki	Katerina Sofianou
Koula Agagiotou	Sofia Sofianou
Joyce Eveidi	Eirini Sofianou
Nikos Kouros	Christos Vakouras
Pavlos Evaggelopoulos	Iason Sekeris
Elda Panopoulou	Charoula Peponaki
Klairi Katsantoni	Eleni Sotiriadou
Nefeli Orfanou	Amalia Vakoura
Tasos Kostis	Foivos Oikonomou
Vicky Vanita	Nora Zacharopoulou
Makis Delaportas	Alkis
Maria Martika	Thaleia Sekeri
Dimitra Seremeti	Aunt Christina
Giannis Nezis	Kostas Tselios

== Similarities ==
A few years after To Retire, Giannis Dalianidis wrote and directed a new sitcom, Oi Mikromesaioi which was a total copy of his previous work. But still, To Retire was not original either. In the late '80s Dalianidis had written a sitcom about modern Greeks and their problems, titled Odos Antheon, which in many ways is similar to both of his following creations.

== Success ==
To Retire was actually a big hit and it is one of the most popular Greek sitcoms. Every summer it is aired again and again on Mega. In the 2008 summer, the sitcom experienced another rerun, also with success. The average rates were 17%, which is very good, especially if you consider that the American sitcom Ugly Betty reached 8% when it is aired on the same time with To Retire.

== Sources ==
- http://www.megatv.com
