= Chronis Exarhakos =

Greek actor

Hronis Exarhakos Χρόνης Εξαρχάκος
- Born: 18 January 1932; Ermoupoli, Greece
- Died: 27 September 1984 (aged 52); Athens, Greece
- Occupation: actor

Hronis Exarhakos (Greek: Χρόνης Εξαρχάκος; 18 January 1932 – 27 September 1984) was a Greek actor.

== Biography ==
He was born in 1932 in Ermoupoli on Syros. He studied at Pelos Katselis's school. In 1963, he performed his first theatrical play Vila ton orgion (Villa of Orgies) with the Rigopoulos-Analiti company. A year later he made his debut in the cinema with the movie Diazygio ala ellinika (Greek-style Divorce) by Odisea Kosteletou. He appeared in 20 other films and played in 60 reviews. Most of these were the best movies including I kori mou i sosialistria (My daughter, the socialist, 1966), Gorgones ke Manges (Mermaids and Rascals, 1968), I Pariziana (The Parisian) (1969), Marijuana Stop! (1971), Mia Elinida sto haremi (A Greek woman in the Harem, 1971) and others.

== Filmography ==
Year	Film title (English translation)	Original title and transliteration	Role
1964	O katafertzis	Ο καταφερτζής	Yiorgos
1964	I Stole a Lady	Έκλεψα τη γυναίκα μου Eklepsa ti yineka mou	Harilaos
1964	Diazygio ala ellinika	Διαζύγιο αλά ελληνικά	-
1965	Only for You	Μόνο για σένα	Giorgos
1966	I kori mou i sosialistria	Η κόρη μου η σοσιαλίστρια	-
1966	Diplopenies	Διπλοπενιές	Kanellos (a waiter)
1967	O Labiris enantion paranomon	Ο Λαμπίρης εναντίον παρανόμων	Savas
1967	Kati kourasmena palikaria	Κάτι κουρασμένα παλικάρια Some Tired Buddies	Voulis
1968	Mia kyria sta bouzoukia	Μια κυρία στα μπουζούκια	Vangêle Papanton
1968	Gorgones kai magkes	Γοργόνες και μάγκες	Kostakis (Grippis)
1968	Enas ippotis gia ti Vassoula	Ένας ιππότης για τη Βασούλα; One Knight for Vassoula	Aristeidis
1969	I Pariziana	Η Παριζιάνα	Leonidas
1969	I oraia tou kourea	Η ωραία του κουρέα	Kitsos
1969	Gymnoi sto dromo	Γυμνοί στο δρόμο	-
1969	O gois	Ο γόης	Aristos
1971	Mia Ellinida sto haremi	Μια Ελληνίδα στο χαρέμι	Hronis
1971	Marijuana Stop	Μαριχουάνα στοπ	Ipokratis
1971	O katergaris	Ο κατεργάρης	Hronis Varnis
1972	To koroidaki tis prigkipessas	Το κοροϊδάκι της πριγκιπέσσας The Princess' Little Lie	Hronis Morros
1981	Ise stin EOK... Mathe gia tin EOK	Είσαι στην ΕΟΚ... Μάθε για την ΕΟΚ	Nondas
1981	Gkarsoniera gia 10	Γκαρσονιέρα για 10	Hronis Babatsikos
