= Joe the Menace =

Tzo o tromeros Joe the Menace Τζο ο τρομερός
- Directed by: Dinos Dimopoulos
- Written by: Dinos Dinopoulos
- Starring: Dinos Iliopoulos; Margarita Papageorgiou; Hristos Tsaganeas; Nikos Rizos; Dionyssis Papayannopoulos; Pantelis Zervos; Giannis Argyris; Nina Sgouridou; Giorgos Damassiotis; Giorgos Nezos; Theodoros Andriakopoulos
- Music by: Argyris Kounadis
- Release date: March 21, 1955
- Running time: 93 minutes
- Country: Greece
- Language: Greek

Joe the Menace (Greek: Greek: Τζο ο τρομερός, Tzo o tromeros) is a 1955 Greek comedy film. It was directed by Dinos Dimopoulos and stars Dinos Iliopoulos, Margarita Papandreou, Hristos Tsaganeas and Nikos Rizos.

== Plot ==
After one month of planning, the first-time safe-breaker, Joe, tries to rob a haughty Russian aristocrat, only to realize that someone else has already emptied the safe of its contents. Can he convince every one of his tainted innocence?

== Cast ==
- Dinos Iliopoulos as Joe Rouvakas
- Christos Tsaganeas as Lavrentis Kalliris
- Nikos Rizos as Gardelis
- Pantelis Zervos as police captain
- Margarita Papageorgiou as Nadia
- Giannis Argyris as boss
- Giorgos Damasiotis as Georgis
- Dionysis Papagiannopoulos as Giannis Karoubas
