= Tasos Giannopoulos =

Greek actor

Tasos Giannopoulos Τάσος Γιαννόπουλος
- Born: 1931; Greece
- Died: November 8, 1977 (aged 45–46); Greece
- Occupation: actor

Anastasios (Tasos) Giannopoulos (Greek: Τάσος Γιαννόπουλος; 1931 – November 8, 1977) was a Greek actor. He was born in 1931 and died of cancer on November 8, 1977, at the age of 46. He was famous as Kitsos in his movies.

== Filmography ==
Year	Film	Transliteration and translation	Role
1960	Malamo	Μαλάμω	-
1962	Gabros yia klammata	Γαμπρός για κλάματα A Husband for Crying	-
1962	O gero-Dimos	Ο γερο-Δήμος	-
1962	Stamatis and Grigoris	Ο Σταμάτης κι ο Γρηγόρης	-
1963	O anipsios mou o Manolis	Ο ανιψιός μου ο Μανώλης; Manolis, My Nephew	-
1963	Lenio the Shepherd	Λενιώ η βοσκοπούλα Lenio i voskopoula	-
1963	The Tourists	Οι τουρίστες (O)i touristes	-
1963	Asteria sto vourko	Αστέρια στο βούρκο	without the name in its title
1964	Kathe limani ke kaimos	Κάθε λιμάνι και καημός	-
1964	I Soferina	Η σωφερίνα	traffic officer Evangelos Fanouridis; Ευάγγελος
1964	O katafertzis	Ο καταφερτζής	-
1964	Itan oloi tous koroida	Ήταν όλοι τους κορόιδα	-
1964	My Greek Wife	Διαζύγιο αλά ελληνικά Diazygio ala ellinika	-
1964	Gamos ala ellinika	Γάμος αλά ελληνικά	traffic police officer
1965	Kardia mou, papse na ponas	Καρδιά μου, πάψε να πονάς	-
1965	Merikes to protimoun haki	Μερικές το προτιμούν χακί	-
1965	Kallio pende sto heri	Κάλλιο πέντε στο χέρι	-
1965	I Eva den amartise	Η Εύα δεν αμάρτησε	-
1965	Oi kyries tis avlis	Οι κυρίες της αυλής	-
1966	I assyniditi	Οι ασυνείδητοι	-
1967	Kolonaki: diagogi miden	Κολωνάκι: διαγωγή μηδέν	-
1967	S' eho panda stin kardia mou	Σ' έχω πάντα στην καρδιά μου I Always Have You With My Heart	-
1967	Praktor Kitsos kalei... Gastouni	Πράκτωρ Κίτσος καλεί... Γαστούνη	also a producer
1967	Ora tis dikaiosynis	Ώρα της δικαιοσύνης	-
1967	Kolonaki diagogi miden	Κολωνάκι διαγωγή μηδέν	-
1967	Get In, Kitsos	Έμπαινε, Κίτσο; Ebene, Kitso	-
1968	Kitsos, mini kai souvlaki	Κίτσος, μίνι και σουβλάκι Kitsis, Mini and a Souvlaki	Kitsos
1968	Kitsos and his Brothers | Ο Κίτσος και τ' αδέλφια του Kitsos kai t'adelfia tou	Kitsos	
1968	Enas ippotis me tsarouchia	Ένας ιππότης με τσαρούχια	Giannis Trechantiris; Γιάννης Τρεχαντήρης
1969	A Husband from Gastouni	Γαμπρός απ' τη Γαστούνη; Gambros ap' ti Gastouni	Kitsos
1969	Yia ena tagari dollaria	Για ένα ταγάρι δολάρια	Kitsos
1970	A Kitsos at the Bouzouki	Ένας Κίτσος στα μπουζούκια Enas Kitsos sta bouzoukia	Chronis Koutsopoulos; Χρόνης Κουτσόπουλος
1975	Μανούλια αλά Ελληνικά Manoulia ala Elinika	Μανούλια αλά Ελληνικά	Λαντο Μουζανκα
