= Sofia Vembo =

Greek singer and actress

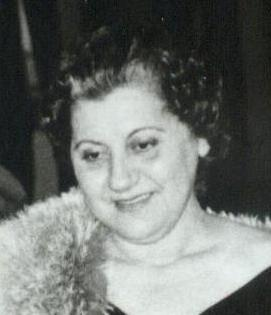
- Born: Sofia Bembou; 10 February 1910; Gallipoli, Adrianople vilayet, Ottoman Empire
- Died: 10 March 1978 (aged 68); Athens, Greece
- Other names: Efi Bembo (Έφη Μπέμπο) "Songstress of Victory"
- Occupations: Singer, actress
- Years active: 1933–1978
- Spouse(s): Mimis Traiforos (1957–1978)
- Children: 1
- Honours: Order of Beneficence

Sofia Bembou (Greek: Σοφία Μπέμπου; 10 February 1910 – 10 March 1978), known professionally as Sofia Vembo (Σοφία Βέμπο), was a leading Greek singer and actress active from the interwar period to the early postwar years and the 1950s. She became best known for her performance of patriotic songs during the Greco-Italian War, when she was dubbed the "Songstress of Victory".

== Biography ==
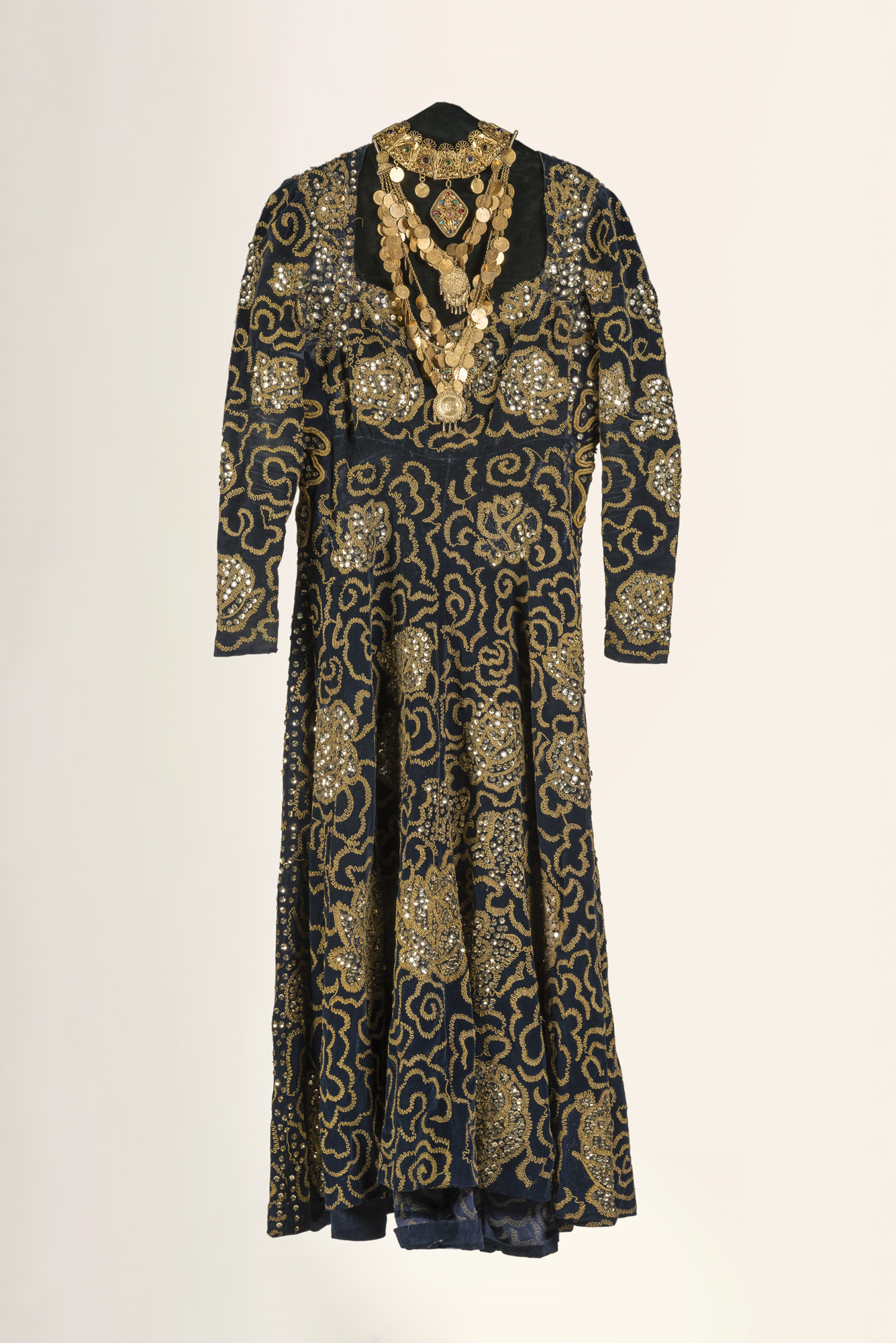
Vempo's stage costume from her theatrical appearances (Athens War Museum collections)

Sofia Bembo was born in Gallipoli, Eastern Thrace, Turkey, and spent her childhood in Istanbul. After the 1923 population exchange, her family moved to Tsaritsani in Greece, where her father became a tobacco worker, and later to Volos.

She began her career in Thessaloniki in the early 1930s. In the winter of 1933, she was hired by the theater operator Fotis Samartzis of the Kentrikon theater for the revue "Parrot 1933". She then began to record romantic songs for the Columbia company, achieving fame because of her distinctly sonorous contralto voice.

Her reputation, however, skyrocketed after the Italian attack on Greece on 28 October 1940, when her performance of patriotic and satirical songs became a major inspiration for the fighting soldiers as well as the people at large for whom she quickly became a folk heroine. Following the German invasion and occupation of the country in April 1941, she was transported to the Middle East, where she continued to perform for the Greek troops in exile.

After the war, in 1949, she acquired her own theatre, the "Vembo Theatre", in the Metaxourgeio neighborhood of Athens. In 1957, she married her long-time lover Mimis Traiforos. During the 1960s, she began to perform less and less, before finally retiring in the early 1970s. In 1973, during the Athens Polytechnic uprising, she gave shelter to students persecuted by the Military Junta security forces. She died on 11 March 1978.

Because of her role in the war and her efforts during the Axis occupation, she was awarded the rank of Major in the Greek Army.

== Filmography ==
Year	Title	Role	Notes
1938	I prosfygopoula	Sofia Nakou	
1955	Stella	Maria	
1959	Stournara 288	Mrs. Eugenia - 'Jenny Blanche'	(final film role)
