= Man for all the chores =

Man for all the chores Άνθρωπος για όλες τις δουλειές
- Directed by: Giorgos Konstantinou
- Written by: Giorgos Konstantinou; Hristos Kyriakos
- Produced by: Giorgos Lazaridis
- Starring: Giorgos Konstantinou; Beata Assimakopoulou; Hloi Liaskou; Giannis Mihalopoulos; Betty Arvaniti; Alekos Tzanetakos
- Music by: Giorgos Theodosiadis
- Distributed by: Roussopouli Company
- Release date: 1966
- Running time: 105 minutes
- Country: Greece
- Language: Greek

Man for all the chores (Greek: Άνθρωπος για όλες τις δουλειές) is a 1966 Greek film directed by Giorgos Konstantinou, written by Giorgos Lazaridis and Hristos Kyriakos and a production of Roussopuloi Company.

== Plot ==
Giorgos Gasparatos, son of the shipowner captain Manolis with his father and resided with family use. He encounter from the waiter and tried to change his live with his right. He believe he can become rich working under the stress and the loneliness of the powerful.

== Cast ==
Actor	Role
Giorgos Konstantinou	Giorgos Pasparatos
Beata Assimakopoulou	Liza
Nikos Tzogias	Stefanos
Giorgos Moutsios	Toni Giannopoulos
Chloi Liaskou	Elli Ermidou
Tzavalas Karousos	Captain Manolis Pasparatos
Giannis Mihalopoulos	John Pappas
Lillian Miniati	Irini
Alekos Tzanetakos	Fanis
Stavros Xenidis	Stavros
Betty Arvaniti	mother
Makis Demiris	bell boy
Maria Ioannidou	maid
Aris Maliagros	Elli's grandfather

== Contribution to music ==
The film's soundtrack contains pioneer performances in the Greek jazz music scene. In 2002 the archived music played in the film was digitized using the original mastertapes.
