= Bouboulina (film) =

1959 film by Kostas Andritsos

Bouboilina Μπουμπουλίνα
- Directed by: Kostas Andritsos
- Written by: Kostas Asimakopoulos; Nektarios Matsas
- Starring: Irene Papas; Koula Agagiotou; Andreas Barkoulis; Gikas Biniaris; Giorgos Foras; Vassilis Kanakis; Nikos Kourkoulos; Artemis Matsas; Miranda Murat; Christoforos Nezer; Giorgos Olimbios; Dionysis Papagiannopoulos; Koulos Stoligas; Nikos Tsachridis; Grigoris Vafias; Georgia Vasileiadou; Giorgos Velentzas; Lefteris Vournas
- Music by: Kostas Kapnisis
- Release date: 1959
- Running time: 95 minutes
- Country: Greece
- Language: Greek

Bouboulina (Greek: Μπουμπουλίνα) is a 1959 Greek drama film directed and written by Kostas Andritsos and starring Irene Papas as Laskarina Bouboulina, Koula Agagiotou, Andreas Barkoulis and Dionysis Papagiannopoulos. The film features the heroine of the Greek Revolutionary of 1821 Laskarina Bouboulina.

== Cast ==
- Irene Papas as Laskarina Bouboulina
- Koula Agagiotou
- Andreas Barkoulis as Dimitros Giannouzas
- Gikas Biniaris
- Giorgos Foras
- Vassilis Kanakis
- Nikos Kourkoulos as Giagos Giannouzas
- Artemis Matsas
- Miranda Myrat as Skevo Pinotsi
- Christoforos Nezer as Panagos
- Giorgos Olibios
- Dionysis Papagiannopoulos
- Koulis Stoligkas or Stoligas as Nikolios
- Nikos Tsahridis
- Grigoris Vafias
- Georgia Vassiliadou as Paraskevoula
- Giorgos Velentzas
- Lefteris Vournas

== Historical Context ==
Bouboulina 1959 Is set during the Greek Revolution of 1821 against the occupying Ottoman Empire and its Sultan Mahmud II (1808-1839). The Ottoman Empire was caught off guard and reacted in disbelief that the Greeks would stage an unprovoked revolt against its far greater occupant. Women played a crucial role in the revolution, most notably in the town of Mani located in the coast of Southern Greece where out of 1500 combatants fending off an Egyptian and Turkish attack, 1000 were women. Laskarina Bouboulina remains the most famed female revolutionary fighter. She participated in numerous naval sieges as well as horseback battles on land.
