= Rendezvous in Corfu =

Rendezvous in Corfu Ραντεβού στην Κέρκυρα
- Directed by: Dimitris Dadiras
- Written by: Giorgos Olymbios
- Starring: Tzeni Karezi; Alekos Alexandrakis; Eleni Halkoussi; Lykourgos Kallergis; Vangelis Ploios; Kaiti Pappa
- Music by: Manos Hatzidakis (song); Nana Mouskouri
- Distributed by: Olympia Film
- Release date: February 8, 1960
- Running time: 85 minutes
- Country: Greece
- Language: Greek

Rendezvous in Corfu (Greek: Ραντεβού στην Κέρκυρα, Randevou stin Kerkyra, alternative names Date in Corfu or Conversations in Corfu) is a 1960 Greek black-and-white drama film directed and written by Dimitris Dadiras and starring Jenny Karezi, Alekos Alexandrakis and Vangelis Ploios. It was produced by Olympia Film.

== Plot ==
A young womanising lawyer (Alekos Alexandrakis) used at "throwing away women like a book fast read" finds a match in the person of the dynamic manager (Jenny Karezi) who works at his mother's hotel in the Greek island of Corfu.

== Cast ==
- Alekos Alexandrakis : Andreas Labrinos
- Jenny Karezi :Diana/Mirka
- Lykourgos Kallergis : Mr. Lianitis
- Eleni Halkoussi : Eleni Lambrinou
- Vangelis Ploios : Tonis
- Kaiti Passa : Janet Giannatou

The soundtrack by Manos Hadjidakis, with songs sung by Nana Mouskouri, was released as Rendezvous at Corfu.
