= Elda Panopoulou =

Greek comedian

Elda Panopoulou (Greek: Έλντα Πανοπούλου) is a Greek comedian, best known for her role as "Haroula Peponaki" in the Greek sitcom To Retire (The Penthouse).

== Early life ==
Panopoulou was born in Athens in the early 1960s. Her two parents were teachers; they owned their own school.

== Career ==
Her first appearance was in a Greek romance series, titled "Alithines Istories", alongside Giorgos Kimoulis and Martha Karagianni in 1984. The ratings were low and after 6 episodes it was cancelled. In 1991 she did her break through as the nervous but caring operator in the Greek sitcom To Retire. After a couple more comedy sitcoms, Panopoulou started to present her own show in the public television.

Panopoulou starred in two more series; "An Thimitheis to Oneiro Mou" and "Jenny kai Evanthia". Both of them were failures and since 2004 she has not acted on television. She dedicated herself to comedy theatre and a few years ago, in 2005 she created her very own theatre school, Melissa Theatre School. In 2007, she did a guest appearance on the popular Greek sitcom To Kokkino Domatio, aired on Mega.
