= The Lake of Thinking =

1958 film

- Directed by: Giorgos Zervos
- Written by: Iakovos Kabanellis; Nikos Tsekouras
- Starring: Tzeni Karezi
- Cinematography: Jerry Kalogeratos
- Release date: January 18, 1958
- Running time: 98 minutes
- Country: Greece
- Language: Greek

The Lake of Thinking (Greek: Η λίμνη των πόθων, translit. I limni ton pothon, also known as The Lagoon of Desire) is a 1958 Greek drama film directed by Giorgos Zervos. The film was selected as the Greek entry for the Best Foreign Language Film at the 30th Academy Awards, but was not accepted as a nominee.

== Cast ==
- Tzeni Karezi as Miranda Kalibouka
- Giorgos Fountas as Christos Razis
- Eleni Zafeiriou as Mrs. Razi
- Koula Agagiotou
- Christoforos Nezer as Asimakis
- Nikos Fermas
- Sonia Zoidou as Asimoula

== See also ==
- List of submissions to the 30th Academy Awards for Best Foreign Language Film
- List of Greek submissions for the Academy Award for Best Foreign Language Film
