= Oh! That Wife of Mine =

Oh! That Wife of Mine Ah! Afti i gynaika mou Αχ αυτή η γυναίκα μου
- Directed by: Giorgos Skalenakis
- Produced by: Nikos Tsiforos; Polyvios Vassiliadis
- Starring: Aliki Vougiouklaki; Dimitris Papamichail; Giannis Mihalopoulos; Sapfo Notara
- Music by: Mimis Plessas
- Distributed by: Damaskinos-Mihailidis
- Release date: 1967
- Running time: 105 minutes
- Country: Greece
- Language: Greek

Oh! That Wife of Mine (Greek: Αχ αυτή η γυναίκα μου Ah! Afti i gynaika mou) was a 1967 Greek film based on a theatre play and was directed by Nikos Tsiforos and Polyvios Vassiliadis.

== Plot ==
A good employee (Papamichail) has dinner with his supervisor (Michalopoulos), hoping for a fast promotion. But things start to turn bad as his wife (Vougioyklaki) accidentally fights with his boss (who have never met before) inside a taxi which both claimed urgently because of the heavy rain.

== Cast ==
Actor	Role
Aliki Vougiouklaki	Nina
Dimitris Papamichail	Dimitris
Giannis Mihalopoulos	Harilaos
Sapfo Notara	Xeni
Maria Konstantarou	Asimina
Despina Stylianopoulou	widow of Miltiadis
Vassilis Malouhos	Stathis
Giorgos Tsaoussis	Faidon
Kostas Spiliopoulos	-
Maro Gavriliotou	-
Ilias Lymbterakis	-

== Information ==
- Year of release: 1967
- Genre: Comedy
- Colour: Black and white
- Tickets 428,079

== Festival ==
The film was presented at the 1967 Thessaloniki Film Festival.
