= Stournara 288 =

- Directed by: Dinos Dimopoulos
- Written by: Dinos Dimopoulos
- Starring: Sofia Vembo; Dinos Iliopoulos; Orestis Makris; Smaroula Giouli; Dionysis Papagiannopoulos
- Release date: January 19, 1959
- Country: Greece
- Language: Greek

Stournara 288 (Στουρνάρα 288) (filmed in 1959) was a drama by Dinos Dimopoulos with Orestis Makris, Smaroula Giouli, Sofia Vembo, Dionysis Papagiannopoulos, Dinos Iliopoulos. It was bitter and nostalgic eyes on its alienation on Athens' neighbourhoods.

== Cast ==
- Sofia Vembo ..... Mrs. Evgenia / Jenny Blanche / Sofia Vembo
- Dinos Iliopoulos ..... Platon
- Orestis Makris ..... Babis
- Smaroula Giouli ..... Doudou Vraila
- Dionysis Papagiannopoulos ..... Agisilaos Papafronimopoulos
- Giorgos Gavriilidis ..... Thomas Asimomytis
- Marika Krevata ..... Kleio Asimomyti
- Beata Asimakopoulou ..... Foula Papafronimopoulou
- Apostolos Avdis ..... Kalohairetas
- Dimitris Kallivokas ..... Antoine Kokos
- Dina Trianti ..... Fofo Asimomyti
- Mary Chronopoulou ..... Mary
- Nikos Fermas ..... Karasolinas
