= Kallieis =

Kallieis Καλλιείς
- Municipal unit
- Location within the regional unit

- Location within Greece
- Coordinates: 38°43′N 22°13′E
- Country: Greece
- Administrative region: Central Greece
- Regional unit: Phocis
- Municipality: Delphi

Area
  - Municipal unit: 183.256 km^{2} (70.756 sq mi)

Population (2021)
  - Municipal unit: 1,123
  - Municipal unit density: 6.128/km^{2} (15.87/sq mi)
- Time zone: UTC+2 (EET)
  - Summer (DST): UTC+3 (EEST)
- Vehicle registration: ΑΜ
- Website: www.kallieon.gr

Kallieis (Greek: Καλλιείς, full form Δήμος Καλλιέων) is a former municipality in the northern part of Phocis, Greece. Since the 2011 local government reform it is part of the municipality Delphi, of which it is a municipal unit. The municipal unit has an area of 183.256 km^{2}. Its registered population in 2021 amounted to 1,123. The seat of the municipality was Mavrolithari, which is home to about 10% of the municipal unit population. The municipality was named after the ancient people of Kallieis, a Dryopean tribe.

== Municipal districts ==
- Athanasios Diakos
- Kastriotissa
- Mavrolithari
- Moussounitsa
- Panourgias
- Pyra
- Stromi

== Population ==
Year	Population
1991	1,179
2001	2,328
2011	1,673
2021	1,123

== Geography ==
The municipality is mostly mountainous, with Mount Giona dominating the north, towards the boundary with Phthiotis. Most of the area is forested. Typical vegetation includes pine, fir, cypress and spruce trees; the higher altitudes are mostly barren, while and farmland is limited to the low-lying valleys. Main industries are agriculture and tourism.

== See also ==
- List of settlements in Phocis
