= Maria Martika =

Greek actress (1932–2018)

- Μαρία Μαρτίκα
- Born: 15 May 1932; Athens, Greece
- Died: 1 June 2018 (aged 86); Athens, Greece
- Occupation: Actress
- Known for: To Retire (Το ρετιρέ)

Maria Martika (Greek: Μαρία Μαρτίκα; 15 May 1932 – 1 June 2018), was a Greek stage, television, and film actress. She became known for the series We and We, To Retire and Penthouse.

Martika was born in Athens, outside the Attica Basin, and studied at the Elementary School and the Exataxi Gymnasium. She graduated from the Karolos Koun Drama School in 1961. She died in her native Athens on 1 June 2018 at the age of 86.

== Voice acting ==
- Cruella De Vil - One Hundred and One Dalmatians
- Madame Medusa - The Rescuers

== Links ==
- Profile, imdb.com; accessed 8 June 2018.
