= Giannis Michalopoulos =

Greek actor (1927–2016)

- Born: 22 April 1927; Athens, Greece
- Died: 10 June 2016 (aged 89); Kifissia, Greece
- Occupation: Actor

Giannis Michalopoulos (Greek: Γιάννης Μιχαλόπουλος; 22 April 1927 – 10 June 2016) was a Greek actor.

== Biography ==
Michalopoulos was born in Athens. He mostly acted in supporting roles, appearing in many movies, his most famous being Ah afti i yineka mou (Oh! That Wife of Mine), and Anthropos yia oles tis doulies. He also had many roles on television; his most famous being Orkisteite parakalo, in which he acted as a judge in a court. He died in Athens.

== Filmography ==
| Year | Film | Transliteration and translation | Role |
|---|---|---|---|
| 1966 | Ah! Kai na 'moun antras | Αχ! Και να 'μουν άντρας | Savas Makryheris |
| 1966 | Anthropos yia oles tis doulies | Άνθρωπος για όλες τις δουλειές (Man for all the chores) | John Pappas |
| 1967 | Mias pendaras niata | (Μιας πεντάρας νιάτα) | Pashallis Avramidis |
| 1967 | Ah! Afti i gynaika mou | Αχ αυτή η γυναίκα μου (Oh! That Wife of Mine) | Harillaos |
| 1969 | Mia treli... treli... sarantara | Μια τρελλή... τρελλή... σαραντάρα (One Crazy... Crazy... 40-Year-Old Woman) | Orestis Petromihalis |
| 1970 | I thia mou i hipissa | Η θεία μου η χίπισσα | Pete |
| 1971 | O katergaris | Ο κατεργάρης (The Rascal) | Miltos Flevaras |
| 1979 | O anthropos laheio | O άνθρωπος λαχείο (The Lottery Man) | Captain Mihalis |
| 1983 | Giftiki kompania | Γύφτικη κομπανία (A Gypsy Company) | - |
| 1984 | An itan to violi pouli | Αν ήταν το βιολί πουλί (If It Was a Bird/Chicken Violin) | - |
