= The Big Streets =

1953 film by Grigóris Grigoríou

- Directed by: Grigoris Grigoriou
- Written by: Dinos Dimopoulos
- Starring: Dinos Dimopoulos
- Cinematography: Thanasis Papadoukas
- Music by: Arghyris Kounadis
- Production company: Afoi Perganti
- Release date: 1953
- Running time: 77 minutes
- Country: Greece
- Language: Greek

The Big Streets (Greek: Megaloi dromoi) is a 1953 Greek drama film directed by Grigoris Grigoriou and starring Dinos Dimopoulos, Liana Liapi and Giannis Argyris. It was neorealist in style. Its failure at the box office led Grigoriou to turn to making more potentially commercial films.

== Cast ==
- Dinos Dimopoulos as Nikos Gerasimou
- Liana Liapi as Margarita
- Giannis Argyris as Thomas Gerasimou
- Giorgos Vlahopoulos
- Veatriki Deligianni
- Giorgos Dimou
- Popi Deligianni
- Stavros Xenidis
- Kostas Strantzalis
- Nana Papadopoulou
- Eirini Koumarianou
- Nana Viopoulou
- Takis Mandilas
- Kostas Kontonis
- Georgios Mitropoulos
- Zoi Rouhota
- Hristos Katzigiannis
- Lina Dadi
- L. Simonetos
- Haroula Antahopoulou
- Marika Ninou
- Vasilis Tsitsanis as Singer

== Bibliography ==
- Vrasidas Karalis. A History of Greek Cinema. A&C Black, 2012.
