= Dimitris Kallivokas =

Greek actor (born 1930)

- Δημήτρης Καλλιβωκάς
- Born: Dimitrios Kallivokas; 30 July 1930 (age 96); Athens, Greece
- Citizenship: Greece
- Education: Athens Conservatoire
- Occupation: Actor
- Years active: 1954–2011
- Employer: Finos Film
- Spouse: Ioanna Kallivoka
- Awards: Thessaloniki International Film Festival (2025)

Dimitrios Kallivokas (Greek: Δημήτριος Καλλιβωκάς; born 30 July 1930) is a Greek actor of cinema, theatre, and television. He appeared in more than seventy films since 1950s.

== Selected filmography ==
Year	Title	Role	Notes
2012	God Loves Caviar		
2007	El Greco	Chacon	
1987	Living Dangerously		
1966	Jenny Jenny	Andreas Dermezis	
1965	And the Wife Shall Revere Her Husband	Iason Panginaropoulos	
1963	Merikoi to protimoun kryo	Lakis's colleague	
1959	Stournara 288	Antoine Kokos	

== Reception ==
In 2025, at the 66th Thessaloniki International Film Festival, he was awarded an honorary distinction for his "contribution to culture".
