= Mauthausen Trilogy =

Four arias with music by Mikis Theodorakis

- Song cycle by Mikis Theodorakis
- 2000 recording cover art
- Other name: The Ballad of Mauthausen; Mauthausen Cantata
- Occasion: 50th anniversary of liberation of the Mauthausen concentration camp (May 1945)
- Text: Iakovos Kambanellis (Greek original), Hebrew version by Elinoar Moav Veniadis, English version by Julie Dennis
- Language: Greek, Hebrew, English
- Based on: "The Ballad of Mauthausen" (1966)
- Composed: 1965
- Dedication: In Memoriam of Liberation
- Performed: 7 May 1995: Mauthausen, Austria by Maria Farantouri, Berliner Instrumentalisten, Jouth Choir Haag, Choir of the Herbsttage Blindenmarkt, conducted by Mikis Theodorakis
- Published: 2000 (CD by pläne), 2018 (digital & remastered by ZAS records)
- Recorded: 7 May 1995 (live in Mauthausen)
- Vocal: English version by Nadja Weinberg, recorded at the Karozas studio in Frankfurt & Hebrew version by Elinoar Moav Veniadi, recorded at the Yossi Ben-Nun studio in Tel Aviv

Premiere
- Date: May 1988
- Location: Mauthausen, Austria
- Conductor: Mikis Theodorakis
- Performers: Maria Farandouri (Greek), Elinor Moav (Hebrew), Gisela May (German)
- Simon Wiesenthal (speech), Asteris Koutoulas, Alexandros Karozas & Tim Dowdall (producers)

The "Mauthausen Trilogy", also known as "The Ballad of Mauthausen" and the "Mauthausen Cantata", is a cycle of four arias with lyrics based on poems written by Greek poet Iakovos Kambanellis, a Mauthausen concentration camp survivor, and music written by Greek composer Mikis Theodorakis. It has been described as the "most beautiful musical work ever written about the Holocaust", and as "an exquisite, haunting and passionate melody that moves Kambanellis' affecting words to an even higher level".

In May 1988, the world premiere of the "Trilogy" at the Mauthausen concentration camp in Austria was attended by then Austrian chancellor Franz Vranitzky and tens of thousands of Europeans. The ballad was conducted by Theodorakis and sung by Maria Farandouri in Greek, Elinor Moav in Hebrew and Gisela May in German. In May 1995, Theodorakis conducted a repeat concert of the ballad at the camp to mark the 50th anniversary of its liberation from the Nazis. Before the concert Simon Wiesenthal made a speech, which was included in the Mauthausen Trilogy CD. The Mauthausen Cycle is one of the best known compositions inspired by events at the Mauthausen concentration camp, it is popular in Israel, and has been used to promote peace and cooperation worldwide. In 1991, the Philharmonic Orchestra of Israel conducted by Zubin Mehta performed the work as part of the Athens Festival.

The ballad reflects Kambanellis's own experience at Mauthausen, including his love for a Lithuanian-Jewish woman, as it recounts the love affair between a young Greek prisoner and his Jewish love amidst the atrocities they witnessed at the camp. Approximately a year after the release of his ballad, during the premiere of the Mauthausen song cycle in London in 1967, Mikis Theodorakis was imprisoned in Greece by the recently installed Greek military junta and his music was banned in the country.

== Historical background ==
In World War II, Iakovos Kambanellis, a Greek author and poet, was imprisoned by the Nazis at the Mauthausen concentration camp in Austria where he witnessed the Nazi atrocities. Over 100,000 victims died at the camp. Kambanellis survived the incarceration at the Nazi concentration camp and, after the liberation by the Allies, started writing a book based on the events and atrocities he witnessed there.

With the passing years, Kambanellis's work remained in manuscript form at his home. Subsequent world events, such as the assassination of US President Kennedy, caused Kambanellis to re-examine and update his manuscript. He then wrote two new chapters, which were eventually published in the Sunday editions of the Greek newspaper Eleftheria and caused a sensation. In December 1965, Kambanellis published his book Mauthausen with the Themelio publishers in Athens.

== Inception and theme ==
While the book was being prepared for publication by Themelio, Kambanellis wrote four poems based on four chapters in his book. The poems recounted the love affair between two young prisoners at the camp. The owner of Themelio publications, Mimis Despotides, suggested to Kambanellis that the four poems should also be released as songs, to coincide with the publication of the book, and suggested Mikis Theodorakis as the composer.

Kambanellis agreed and gave the poems to his friend Mikis Theodorakis who was very receptive to the idea of composing the music for them, since he was also imprisoned by the Nazis and Italian fascists in Greece during the war, and created the "Mauthausen Trilogy" which was quite unlike any of his previous works. The premiere of the works in Greece was at a theatre in Hippocrates street in Athens in December 1965 and the reception by the audience was enthusiastic.

== Structure ==
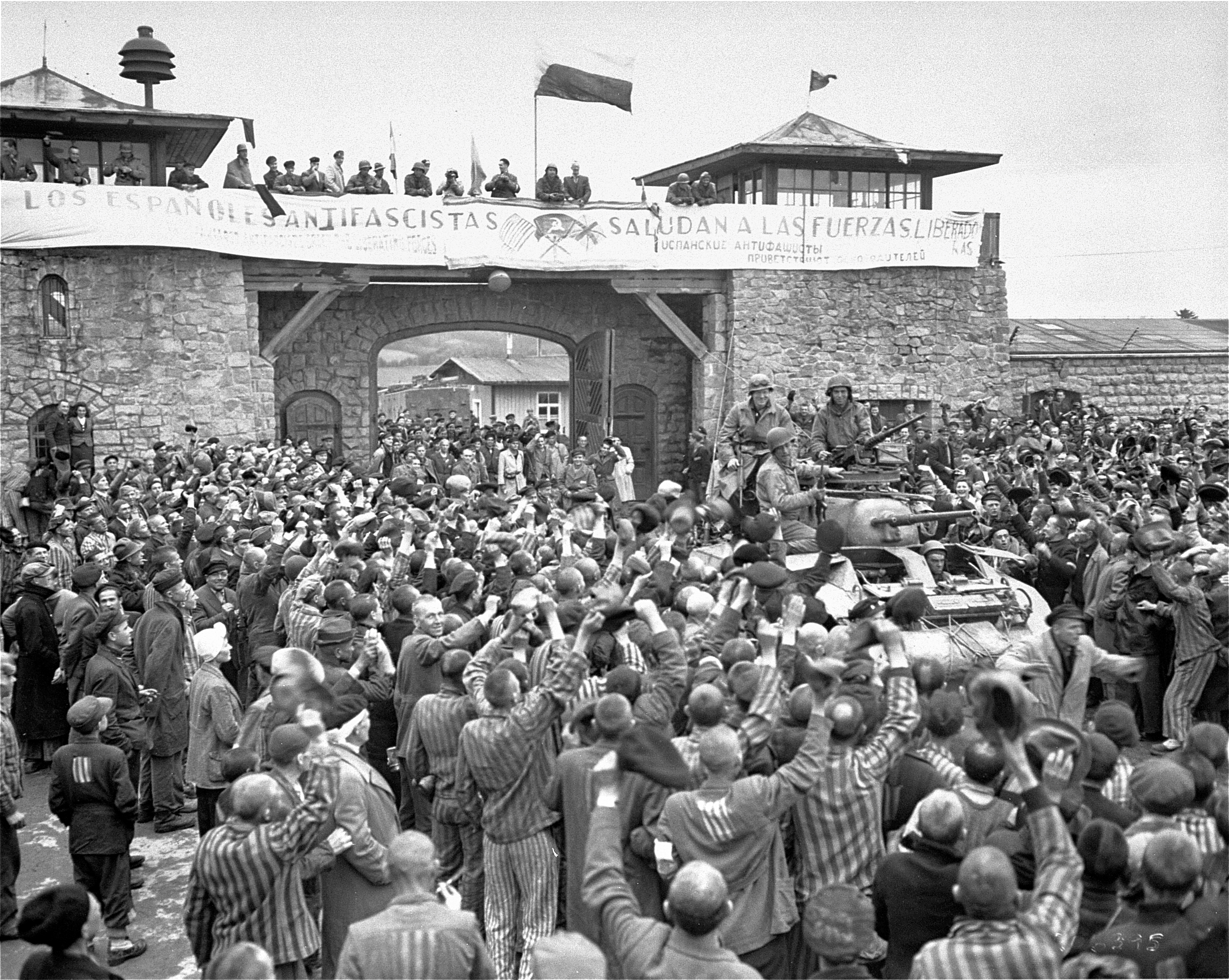
Tanks of the US 11th Armored Division entering the Mauthausen concentration camp in 1945

The title of the songs is "The Ballad of Mauthausen" and contained four arias: "Άσμα ασμάτων [Asma Asmaton]" (Song of Songs) with verses inspired to a degree by erotic lyrics from the biblical Song of Songs, and includes the lyrics Τι ωραία που είναι η αγάπη μου [Ti oraia pou einai i agapi mou] (How beautiful is my beloved). The second song was "Αντώνης [Antonis]" (Anthony), followed by "Δραπέτης [Drapetis]" (Runaway) and "Όταν τελειώση ο πόλεμος] Otan Teleiosi o Polemos" (When the War Ends). The composition is a music cycle.

In "Asma Asmaton" the struggle of the young male prisoner is depicted as he is trying hopelessly to locate his love. It reflects Kambanellis's own experience at Mauthausen with a Lithuanian-Jewish woman, as it recounts the love affair between a young Greek prisoner and his Jewish love. Kambanellis uses a question from the biblical "Song of Songs" 3:3: "Have you seen the one I love?" as the refrain for his lyrics.

In the lyrics, the hero is asking the girls of the concentration camps if they saw the girl he loves: "Girls of Auschwitz, girls of Dachau, have you seen the one I love?" and the reply is: "We saw her on a long journey. She no longer had her dress nor the little comb in her hair". He then asks again: "Girls of Mauthausen, girls of Belsen, have you seen the one I love? and gets the reply: "We saw her in the frozen square with a number in her white hand, with a yellow star on her heart".

In "Antonis", the suffering of the imprisoned Jews doing hard labour, at the Mauthausen quarries is told, "mixed with a revolutionary and subversive mood". Antonis is a Greek prisoner who tries to help his Jewish friend carry a heavy boulder up an incline of 180 steps after his friend cannot work any longer and asks Antonis to help him. The boulders are used to pave the streets of Vienna. The lyrics state: "help is an insult. compassion a curse", indicating that helping another inmate is severely punished by the Nazi guards.

However, Antonis helps his friend without hesitation. A Nazi guard intervenes and, to punish Antonis, instructs him to carry a boulder twice as heavy. Antonis then chooses an even heavier boulder than the one the Nazi guard showed him and carries it to the top instead. Antonis states his name in Greek: "Μένα με λένε Αντώνη, κι' αν είσαι άντρας έλα δω στο μαρμαρένιο αλώνι" ("My name is Antonis, and if you are a man come here on the marble threshing floor"), challenging the guard and implying that real men are fighting for their lives in the Nazi quarry. The image of the marble threshing-floor is common in Greek folk literature, deriving from the Akritic songs, where the eponymous hero, Digenis Akritas, "as a kind of representative of mankind's struggles with Charos, death, at the marble threshing-floor".

In "Drapetis", the adventure of an escapee, "Yannos Ber from The North", is narrated through the song, as is also his recapture by the SS which leads to his "tragic fate".

The finale "Otan Teleiosi o Polemos" is a fantasy about the reunion of the two lovers. It goes full circle with the girl from "Song of Songs" appearing as "the girl with the fearful eyes" and "the girl with the frozen hand", and shows the protagonist of the first part, "Asma Asmaton", seeking love everywhere inside the concentration camp as a means of erasing Death, singing the words: "Έρωτα μεσ' στο μεσημέρι σ' όλα τα μέρη του θανάτου ώσπου ν' αφανιστεί η σκιά του" (Make love at midday, in all of Death's places until his Shadow disappears".

== Reception ==
The ballad is considered as possibly the greatest work of Theodorakis, while the "Song of Songs" has been described as "one of the finest songs Theodorakis has ever written". The music critic of the Baltimore Sun writes: "Theodorakis had the genius to set this poem with melodic elements from the hymn for Palm Sunday of the Eastern Orthodox Church, creating an exquisite, haunting and passionate melody that moves Kambanellis' affecting words to an even higher level."

Jerry Silverman in his book The Undying Flame: Ballads and Songs of the Holocaust writes that "we can be [similarly] enthralled by the passionate lyrics and haunting melody of "Asma Asmaton"" and "[Kambanellis] also wrote a cycle of four poems based on episodes in his book, which were lovingly set to music by Mikis Theodorakis". Silverman also calls "Asma Asmaton" "extraordinarily moving".

Sophia Richman in her book Mended by the Muse: Creative Transformations of Trauma writes: "The song cycle is a requiem for Holocaust victims and raised the consciousness of all Greeks. Its sublime melodic lines, extended harmonies and rhythms, forced listeners to ask, "What happened to our Jews?"". Richman also mentions that the composer "created songs that have entered the pantheon of acclaimed song cycles".

Yaʾir Oron in the book The Pain Of Knowledge: Holocaust And Genocide Issues In Education writes that Kambanellis's poem "Song of Songs" "touches on certain aspects of the attitude of the world to the victims of the Holocaust in a unique way". Oron further comments that "Through its delicate poetical phrasing and its allusions to the biblical "Song of Songs" (Song of Solomon), the reader's attention is drawn to seemingly trivial details rather than to abstract generalizations. In this way, the poem evokes a personal identification with a specific figure (a young Jewish girl in this case)." Oron concludes that these attributes of the poem will make the pupil interested in the poem itself as well as the greater historical context surrounding the events depicted in the lyrics.

Kambanellis's poem "Song of Songs" has been included in a 7th Grade reader which is approved for the new middle schools' literature curriculum in Israel.

The work has been described as a "classical piece", and as "one that contrasts the Nazi horror with the only possible joy, the joy of resistance".

During the premiere of his ballad in London in 1967, Mikis Theodorakis was in Greece imprisoned by the recently installed Greek military junta and his music was banned in the country.

On 6 May 1994 at a concert in Carnegie Hall, filled to capacity, the audience joined Farandouri in singing the ballad. There are editions of these songs in Hebrew and several other languages. Already in 1967, on Theodorakis' request, Liesbeth List sung the Mauthausen cycle in Dutch in Liesbeth List zingt Theodorakis, which became a platinum disc.

== World premiere and anniversaries ==
In May 1988, the world premiere of the "Mauthausen Trilogy", described as a "landmark concert", took place with Mikis Theodorakis conducting at the Mauthausen concentration camp in Austria. The concert was attended by Austrian chancellor Franz Vranitzky along with tens of thousands of people from across Europe. Iakovos Kambanellis was also present. The ballad was sung by Maria Farandouri in Greek, Elinoar Moav Veniadi in Hebrew, Nadia Weinberg in English, and by East-German singer Gisela May in German.

In May 1995, a repeat concert at Mauthausen camp took place to mark the 50th anniversary of the liberation of the camp conducted again by Theodorakis, which was also attended by chancellor Vranitzky and Simon Wiesenthal, who held a speech during the event. Maria Farandouri was the performer of the songs at that concert as well.

On 10 May 2015, the ballad of Theodorakis was played in a ceremony at the Greek memorial of Mauthausen honouring the memory of the 3,700 Greek victims of the Holocaust with Zoe Konstantopoulou attending as speaker of the Hellenic Parliament on the occasion of the 70th anniversary of the liberation of the camp. Delegations from other European states and thousands of Europeans also attended ceremonies at the memorials of their individual countries.

In October 2015 the municipality of Larissa in Greece included the performance of Theodorakis's ballad as part of a five-day celebration commemorating the liberation of the city from the Nazi occupation.

== Wider impact ==
The song "Antonis" from the ballad has been used by the Kurds as musical background in a video showing Kurdish women fighting at Kobanî during the Syrian Civil War. The song was also sung by the residents of Kabul in 2001 as they greeted troops of the Northern Alliance in Afghanistan entering the city and expelling the Taliban. The aria of "Antonis" was the music theme of Costa-Gavras's 1969 film Z, whose soundtrack won a BAFTA Award for Best Film Music in 1970.

"Antonis" was also chosen as the background music for a pre-election advertising spot of Syriza, a fact criticised by the newspapers because the name "Antonis" was that of the New Democracy leader at the time, Antonis Samaras, and the lyrics depict Antonis as a heroic figure who challenges anyone to fight with him on the marble threshing-floor. The title of one newspaper article translates as: "[Elena] Akrita: Did anyone at Syriza pay attention to the lyrics of the piece they chose for their [advertising] spot?" and the other: "Unfortunate selection of music in Syriza's [advertising] spot".

== Theatrical play ==
A theatrical play based on the Trilogy premiered in Athens on 6 December 2012 featuring the music of Mikis Theodorakis and Gustav Mahler. The work appeared at the Badminton Theater in Athens under the title Mauthausen. Theodorakis had granted permission for the use of his work during the play.
