= Vicky Vanita =

Greek actress

Vasiliki "Vicky" Vanita (Greek: Βασιλική "Βίκυ" Βανίτα; 15 May 1948 – 8 March 2007) was a Greek actress.

== Life ==
She was known for her participation in several Greek movies and television series (Eisai to tairi mou, Sto Para Pente, To Retire). She appeared in the 1968 movie Thiella sto spiti ton anemon and up to 1984 she co-starred in productions such as O trelopenintaris (along with Lambros Konstantaras), Paraggelia (by Pavlos Tassios) and Rebetiko by Costas Ferris. Her last appearance in a film was in the movie Edo einai Valkania (1984).

== Death ==
Vanita was found dead in her apartment in Koukaki, Athens on 8 March 2007. She died after a long struggle with lung cancer.
