= The Last Mission =

1949 film

- Directed by: Nikos Tsiforos
- Written by: Nikos Tsiforos
- Starring: Smaroula Giouli
- Cinematography: Joseph Hepp
- Release date: April 4, 1949
- Running time: 80 minutes
- Country: Greece
- Language: Greek

The Last Mission (Greek: Teleftaia apostoli) is a 1949 Greek drama film directed by Nikos Tsiforos. It was entered into the 1951 Cannes Film Festival.

== Cast ==
- Smaroula Giouli as Maria Mareli
- Miranda Myrat as Anna Mareli
- Vasilis Diamantopoulos as Miltiadis Marelis
- Nikos Tzogias as Nikos
- Dimos Starenios as the interpreter
- Renos Koulmasis as Captain Friedrich
- Sofi Lila as Smaragdi
- Kimon Fletos as Lefteris
- Giorgos Hamaratos
- Spyros Kallimanis as the German commander
- Vagelis Protopapas (as Evangelos Protopappas) as the interrogator
- M. Takatakis
- Thanasis Tzeneralis (as Athanasios Tzeneralis) as the police captain
