= Koula Agagiotou =

Greek actress (1915–2006)

Koula Agagiotou Κούλα Αγαγιώτου
- Born: Angeliki Agagiotou; 1915; Athens, Greece
- Died: 25 October 2006 (aged 90–91); Athens, Greece
- Occupation: actress

Koula Agagiotou (Greek: Κούλα Αγαγιώτου; 1915 – 25 October 2006) was a Greek actress. She is probably best known for her role in the Greek sitcom To Retire.

== Biography ==
Agagiotou's real name was Angeliki. She appeared in more than fifty films, including a well-received performance in the 1971 film Evdokia. Her last appearance was in To Retire.

Agagiotou was married and had a daughter.

== Filmography ==
Agagiotou made her film debut in 1951. She mostly appeared in dramas, and during the 1980s she participated in cult comedies such as Kamikazi Agapi Mou alongside Stathis Psaltis.

Year	Title	Role
1990	To Retire	Sofia Sofianou
1983	Kamikazi Agapi Mou	Domna Sgourou
1982	I Strofi	Mrs. Kazantzi
1982	Kerato Sto Kerato	Antigoni
1975	Ena Tanks Sto Krevati Mou	Kostas's mother
1975	O Tromokratis	
1974	Methoriakos Stathmos	Koula
1971	Evdokia	Maria Koutroubi
1970	O Dosilogos	
1969	Zavolies	
1969	Thelo Piso To Paidi Mou	
1969	To Hamogelo	
1969	Zavolies	
1968	Doctor Ziveggos	Aspasia Markopoulou
1968	Gorgopotamos	
1967	O Prodotis	
1967	Antio Gia Panta	Mina
1967	Nymfios anymfeftos	Meropi
1966	To Koritsi me ta Vourkomena Matia	
1966	I Parastratimeni	fashion designer
1965	To Bloko	
1965	Lolites tis Athinas	
1965	Giati Gennithika Ftohi	
1964	Paidi mou den Amartisa	
1964	Dromos horis synora	
1963	I Kardia tis Manas	
1963	Ligo prin ximerosei	
1963	Fygi	
1963	Kathos prepei, Oi	Nana Provata
1963	Merokamato tou ponou, To	
1962	Poliorkia	
1962	Loustrakos, O	Nena
1962	Yperifanoi, Oi	
1961	Antigone	
1961	Apolytrosis	
1960	Never on Sunday	prostitute
1960	Amartola neiata	
1960	Kyria dimarhos, I	Koula Prokopi
1960	Stin porta tis kolaseos	
1960	Matomeno peplo	
1960	Stahtopouta	Mary's mother
1960	Malamo	
1960	Agrimi, To	
1959	Bouboulina	
1959	Taxeidi me ton erota	Maria
1959	Erotikes istories	Maria
1959	Giannos ki i Pagona, O	Maria, Panona's mother
1958	I Galini	aunt Maria
1958	Mia xeni perase	
1958	The Lake of Thinking	
1957	Tzip Periptero kai Agapi	Dionissia Thanassea
1957	Tis tyhis ta grammena	mother of beauty pageant contestant
1957	Peirasmos, O	
1956	Grafeio synoikesion	agency client
1951	Matomena Xristougenna	
