= Voula Zouboulaki =

Egyptian-born Greek actress

- Born: Paraskevi Zouboulaki; 24 September 1924; Cairo, Kingdom of Egypt
- Died: 7 September 2015 (aged 90); Athens, Greece
- Occupation: Actress
- Years active: 1952-1990
- Spouse: Dimitris Myrat

Paraskevi "Voula" Zouboulaki (Greek: Βούλα Ζουμπουλάκη; 24 September 1924 – 7 September 2015) was an Egyptian-born Greek actress. She was the wife of actor Dimitris Myrat. She attended the Dramatic School of the National Theatre, the School of the National Odeon and the Law School of the University of Athens.

== Biography ==
Zouboulaki was born in Cairo, on 24 September 1924. In Greek, "Voula" is a nickname for girls named Paraskevi. She originally studied at the Law School of the University of Athens after her parents pressure but soon she turned to the theatre and attended the Dramatic School of the National Theatre. In 1951, she wed actor Dimitris Myrat. She began her career at the National Lyric Stage in 1952 and two years later appeared in prose. She later starred in several movies including adaptations from plays by Federico García Lorca, Luigi Pirandello, William Faulkner and Tennessee Williams. She received awards at the International Theatrical Festival in Lisbon in 1964 and at the Thessaloniki Cinematic Festival in 1966.

Zouboulaki was awarded the First Lisbon Festival Awards (1964), the M. Kotopouli Second Prize in 1965, and the First Actor's Prize at the Thessaloniki Cinematic Festival in 1966. She appeared in the film Stella in the role of Anetta. The film won the award for Best Foreign Language film at the Golden Globe awards in 1956. She died on 7 September 2015, aged 90.

== Filmography ==
- Stella (1955) .... Anneta
- Mono gia mia nyhta (1958) .... Anna
- Karagiozis, o adikimenos tis zois (1959) .... Marika Asteri / Liza Aygerinou
- Eimai athoos (1960) .... Lucia Dreyfus
- Iligos (1963) .... Kaiti Kapralou
- Diogmos (1964) .... Katerina Rodeli
- Ohi, ...kyrie Johnson (1965) .... Eleni
- Syntomo dialeimma (1966) .... Emma Karali
- Oi Athinaioi (1990) .... Stavrianidou

== Awards ==
Film Awards
Year	Award	Film	Result
1966	Thessaloniki Festival Award for best actress	Syntomo Dialeimma	Won
