= Eleni Zafeiriou =

Greek actress

Eleni Zafeiriou Ελένη Ζαφειρίου
- Born: 1916; Larissa, Greece
- Died: 2 September 2004 (aged 87–88); Athens, Greece
- Occupation: Actress
- Years active: 1951–1996

Eleni Zafeiriou (Greek: Ελένη Ζαφειρίου; 1916 – 2 September 2004) was a Greek film actress. She appeared in 108 films between 1951 and 1996. She was born in Larissa, Greece, and died in Athens.

== Filmography ==
=== In film ===
- Bitter Bread (1951)
- Dead City (1951)
- I Agni tou limaniou (1951)
- Madame X (1954) – Rosa
- A girl in black (1956) – Froso
- I kafetzou (1956) – Anna Giavassi
- The Aunt from Chicago (1957) Efterpi Barda
- A Matter of Dignity (1957)
- The Lake of Thinking (1958)
- Zalongo, to kasto tis lefterias (1959) – Javelaina
- Romance Stories (1959) – Smaragdi
- I limni ton stenagmon (1959) – Vagia
- Stratiotes dichos stoli (1960) – Martha
- The Downhill (1961) – Elisavet Nikolaou
- Law 4000 (1962) – Anna Ikonomou
- Glory Sky (1962)
- Anisicha niata (1963) – Lena
- Despoinis diefnytis (1964) – Loukia Samiotaki
- Egoism (1964) – Maria
- The First Love (1964)
- I gymni taxiarchia (1965) – Sofia
- Me pono kai dakrya (1965) – Maria
- Perifrona me glykia mou (1965) – Despoina
- Kardia mou papse na ponas (1965) – as Theia
- Jenny Jenny (Jenny-Jenny) (1966) – Matina Skoutari
- Dokimassia (1955) – Eleni Moraitou
- O anthropos pou gyrise apo ton pono (1966) – Irini Liossi
- The Windy House (1966) – Nina Iordanidou
- Kapote klaine lai oi dynatoi (1967) – Angeliki
- The Husband from London (1967) – Eleni
- Ta dolaria tis Aspasias (1967) – Aspasia
- I archontissa kai o alitis (1968) – a mother
- Afti pou de lygise (1968) – Maria
- Tapeinos kai katafronemenos (1968) – Maria Kanava
- Xerizomeni genia (1968) – Fani Karatzoglou
- I kardia enos aliti (1968) – Katerina Sarri
- Wake Up, Vassilis (1969) – Antigoni Vassilaki
- The Last Goodbye (1969)
- Gia tin timi kai ton erota (1969) – Klada
- Enas andras me syneidisi (1969) – Tasia
- I odysseia enos xerizomenou (1969) – Fani Karatzoglou
- Ftochogeitonia agapi mou (1969) – Riga, grandma
- The Refugee (1959) – Despoina Skoutari
- Esena monon agapo (1970) – mitera
- Ipolochagos Natassa (1970) – a mother of Natassa
- Astrapogiannos (1970) – Zachari
- Men Know How to Love (1970) – Amalia
- Agapissa enan aliti (1971)
- Pros tin eleftheria (1996)

== In television ==
- Dona Rosita (1984)
- The Third Crown (1995, ANT1)
- The Colour of the Moon (1996–97, ANT1)
