= Antigoni Valakou =

Greek actress (1930–2013)

- Born: Antigoni Valakou; 24 March 1930; Kavala, Greece
- Died: 12 November 2013 (aged 83); Athens, Greece
- Resting place: Cemetery of Kokkinos Mylos, Nea Filadelfia, Athens
- Occupations: Film and stage actress
- Years active: 1946–2011

Antigoni Valakou (Greek: Αντιγόνη Βαλάκου; 24 March 1930 – 12 November 2013) was one of Greece's most important film and stage actresses.

== Biography ==
Valakou was born in Kavala in 1930 and her family moved to Athens when she was 16 years old. She attended the Dramatic School of Vasilis Rotas. She got her first theatrical role in 1946 and performed with the famous Greek actor Aimilios Veakis. In the early 1950s she became known as an "ingénue", before joining the National Theater of Greece, where she starred in productions of plays by Shakespeare, Charles Morgan, Bernard Shaw and Jean Anouilh, Arthur Miller and others.

From 1958 she had her own theatrical group. She performed more than 120 roles including Maria Stuart, Hedda Gabler, Juliet, Nora, Bernarda Alba, Electra, Antigone, Cassandra, Medea, Agauë, Iphigenia, Jocasta, etc. She played Ophelia in a 1955 production of Hamlet and Electra (directed by Spyros Evangelatos) in 1972. Her most recent appearances on stage were in the title roles in Martin Sherman's Rose in 2000 and Stephen Temperley's Madame Flo in 2011.

She appeared in more than fifteen films, and also worked in radio and television, mostly in plays adaptations. She was a teacher at the National Theatre of Greece Drama School for some twenty years.

Her career spanned six decades and she received multiple awards for her performances throughout the years. In 1958 she was awarded the prize "Marika Kotopouli – Best actress". In 2002, she was recognized by the President of the Hellenic Republic for her lifetime achievement. In Kavala, her birthplace, the Antigoni Valakou theatre was named in her honour.

== Death ==
Antigoni Valakou died on 12 November 2013, aged 83, in Evangelismos Hospital.

== Filmography ==
- Nanourisma (2001)
- Mikra preloudia (1998)
- Paramoni protohronias (1994)
- To eftihismeno prosopo tis Leonoras (1982) ..... Anna
- O metanastis (1965)
- Athoa i enohi? (1963) ..... Anna Apergi
- Dyo manes sto stavro tou ponou (1962)
- I Ellinida kai o erotas (1962) ..... Maria
- Otan xypna to parelthon (1962) ..... Elsa Vellidi
- Flogera kai eima (1961) ..... Rinio Vlahopanagou
- Hamena oneira (1961) ..... Liza Zeringa
- Krystallo (1959) ..... Krystallo
- To amaxaki (1958) ..... Annoula
- I moira grafei tin istoria (1956) ..... Anna
- Tis tyhis ta grammena (1957) ..... Elsa
- O dromos me tis akakies (1956) ..... Lena Petri
- Golfo (1955) ..... Golfo
- Oi ouranoi einai dikoi mas (1953) ..... Spourgitaki
