= Alekos Alexandrakis =

Greek actor

- Born: 27 November 1928; Athens, Greece
- Died: 8 November 2005 (aged 76); Athens, Greece
- Occupation: Actor
- Partner: Nonika Galinea
- Awards: International Thessaloniki Film Festival; Hellenic Association of Film Critics Award; 1962: Thriamvos

Alekos Alexandrakis (Greek: Αλέκος Αλεξανδράκης; 27 November 1928 – 8 November 2005) was a famous Greek actor. He was known for his theatrical work as well as work in film and television. He died of lung cancer.

Alexandrakis starred in more than 60 films, including Stella with the late Melina Mercouri in 1955, Laterna ftoheia kai filotimo (1955), Mia trelli... trelli oikogeneia (1965) and Oi Kyries tis avlis (1966). He also directed two films in the early 1960s.

== Filmography ==
=== Film ===
Title	Greek title	English title/translation	Year	Role	Notes
Cheirokrotimata	Χειροκροτήματα	Applause	1944		
Dyo Kosmoi	Δυο κόσμοι	Two Worlds	1949	Giorgos	
Ekeines pou den prepei n'agapoun	Εκείνες που δεν πρέπει ν' αγαπούν	Those Who Must Not Love	1951	Pavlos	
Mia nychta son Paradeiso	Μια νύχτα στον Παράδεισο	One Night in Paradise	1951	Agis Damianos	
I Agni tou limaniou	Η Αγνή του λιμανιού	Agnes of the Harbour	1952	Andreas	
O Vaftistikos	Ο βαφτιστικός	The Godson	1952	Manos Kortasis	
Eva	Εύα	Eva	1953	Antinoos	
Oi ouranoi einai dikoi mas	Οι ουρανοί είναι δικοί μας	The Skies Are Ours	1953	Tonis Varenthis	
Stella	Στέλλα	Stella	1955	Alekos	
Laterna ftohia ke filotimo	Λατέρνα φτώχεια και φιλότιμο	Hurdy-Gurdy, Poverty, and Dignity	1955	Dimitris	
To organaki	Το οργανάκι	The Hurdy-Gurdy	1955	Loris	
Kokkina triantafylla	Κόκκινα τριαντάφυλλα	Red Roses	1955	Takis Drigos	
Agnostos	Άγνωστος	The Stranger	1956	Alkis Flerianos	
Katrakylisma	Κατρακύλισμα	The Fall	1956	Telis	
I thisia tis manas	Η θυσία της μάνας	The Mother's Sacrifice	1956		
To koritsi me ta paramythia	Το κορίτσι με τα παραμύθια		1957	Angelos	
Laterna ftohia ke garifalo	Λατέρνα φτώχεια και γαρύφαλλο	Hurdy-Gurdy, Poverty, and Carnations	1957	Dimitris	
Barbayiannis o kanatas	Μπαρμπαγιάννης ο κανατάς	Uncle John the Potter	1957	Loukas	
To agorokoritso	Το αγοροκόριτσο		1959	Dimitris	
Rantevou stin Kerkyra	Ραντεβού στην Κέρκυρα	Rendez-vous in Corfu	1960	Andreas	
To Klotsoskoufi	Το Κλοτσοσκούφι		1960	Tzortzis Vengelis	
To nisi ton gennaion	Το νησί των Γενναίων		1960	Manolis	
Egklima sta paraskinia	Έγκλημα στα παρασκήνια	Murder Backstage	1960	journalist Makris	
Eimai athoos	Είμαι αθώος		1960	Major Walsin-Esterhazy	
Synoikia to oneiro	Συνοικία το όνειρο	Dream Neighbourhood	1961	Rikos	
Mana mou ton agapissa	Μάνα μου τον αγάπησα	Mother, I Loved Him	1961		
O thriamvos	Ο θρίαμβος	The Triumph	1962	Stefanos Razis	
Horis taftotita	Χωρίς ταυτότητα		1963	Giannis Donaventis	
I Pseftra	Η ψεύτρα	The Liar	1963	Thanos Sotiriou	
Ena koritsi gia dyo	Ένα κορίτσι για δυο		1963	Kimon	
Iligos	Ιλιγκος		1963	Nikos	
I Soferina	Η σωφερίνα	The Chauffeur Lady	1964	Nikos Diamantidis	
To doloma	Το δόλωμα	The Decoy	1964	Babis Valeris	
Dis diefthyntis	Δεσποινίς διευθυντής		1964	Alekos Samiotakis	
O metanastis	Ο μετανάστης		1965	Thanasos Rigas	
Epistrofi	Επιστροφή	Return	1965	Dimitris Valentis	
Mia trelli... trelli oikogeneia	Μια τρελή... τρελή οικογένεια		1965	Andreas	
Vromiki polis	Βρώμικη πόλις		1965	Alexis Vilias	
Oi ehthroi			1965	Alekos Theoharis	
Oi kyries tis avlis	Οι κυρίες της αυλής	The Ladies of the Courtyard	1966	Nikos Alexiou	
Syntomo dialeimma	Σύντομο διάλειμμα	Brief Break	1966	Giannis Papadopoulos	
Dakrya gia tin Ilektra	Δάκρυα για την Ηλέκτρα	Tears for Electra	1966	Giorgos	
I artista	Η αρτίστα	The Artist	1966	Dimitris Karamanis	
Mia Italida ap' tin Kypseli	Μια Ιταλίδα απ΄ την Κυψέλη	An Italian Woman From Kypseli	1968	Antonis	
Synnefiasmenoi orizontes	Συννεφιασμενοι οριζοντες		1968	Vangelis	
Oikogeneia Chorafa	Οικογένεια Χωραφά	The Family Horafa	1968	Pantelis Horafas	
Afti pou den lygise	Αυτη που δεν λύγισε		1968	Alekos	
Ta dyo podia s' ena papoutsi	Τα δυο πόδια σ'ενα παπούτσι		1969	Giorgos	Voice
Xypna Vasili	Ξύπνα Βασίλη	Wake Up Vasili	1969	Manos Apostolou	
To nyfopazaro	Το νυφοπάζαρο		1969		
Ston ilingo tis zois	Στον ιλιγκο της ζωής		1969	Stelios Diamantis	
I diki enos athoou	Η δίκη ενός αθώου		1969	Vasilis Doranis	
O Teleftaios Aichmalotos	Ο τελευταίος αιχμάλωτος	The Last Prisoner	1970	Dinos Kambas	
Omorfes meres	Όμορφες μέρες	Beautiful Days	1970		
Den yparchoun lipotaktes	Δεν υπάρχουν λιποτάκτες	There Are No Deserters	1970	Iasonas	
Papaflessas	Παπαφλέσσας	Papaflessas	1971	Kanellos Deligiannis	
Aittitos	Αήττητος	Undefeated	1971	Kostas Valis	
Gia mia choufta Touristries	Για μια χούφτα τουρίστριες	For A Handful of Women Tourists	1971	Menelaos	
Agapissa enan aliti	Αγάπησα έναν αλήτη	I Loved a Tramp	1971	Alekos Raisis	
I Komissa tis Kerkyras	H κόμισσα της Κέρκυρας	The Countess of Corfu	1972	Sotiris Karelis	
Ippokratis kai dimokratia	Ιπποκράτης και δημοκρατία	Hippocrates and Democracy	1972	Periklis	
I Maria tis Siopis	Η Μαρία της σιωπής	Silent Maria	1973	Grigoris	
O glaros	Ο γλάρος		1976		
O anthropos me to garyfallo	Ο άνθρωπος με το γαρύφαλλο	The Man With the Carnation	1980	Georgios Kartalis	
Mia statheri sizigos	Μια σταθερη σύζυγος		1983		
Ta paidia tis chelidonas	Τα παιδιά της χελιδόνας	The Swallow's Children	1987	Markianos	
I ekdikisi tou patera	Η εκδίκηση του πατέρα	The Father's Revenge	1990	Phaethon	
To fos pou svinei	Το φως που σβήνει	The Light That Fades	2000	Nikolas Soursoumis	
Mia mera ti nychta	Μια μέρα τη νύχτα	One Day at Night	2001	Harilaos	(final film role)

=== Television series (as a guest star) ===
Title	Hellenization	English name	Year	Role	Episode	Hellenization	English name
Tmina ithon	Τμήμα ηθών	Vice Department	1992	Andreas Kanelos	Epikindyno veloudo	Επικίνδυνο βελούδο	Dangerous Velvet
Anatomia enos egklimatos	Ανατομία ενός εγκλήματος	Anatomy of a Crime	1994		Gordios desmos	Γόρδιος δεσμός	Gordian Knot

== Movies (as a director) ==
Name	Hellenization	English name	Year
Thriamvos	Θρίαμβος	–	1960
Synoikia to oneiro	Συνοικία το όνειρο	–	1961
