= Dead City (film) =

1951 film

- Directed by: Frixos Iliadis
- Written by: Frixos Iliadis
- Starring: Irene Papas
- Cinematography: Joseph Hepp; Aristeidis Karydis-Fuchs
- Edited by: Aristeidis Karydis-Fuchs
- Production companies: Finos Fil; Narivalas
- Release date: 3 December 1951
- Running time: 76 minutes
- Country: Greece
- Language: Greek

Dead City (Greek: Nekri politeia) is a 1951 Greek drama film directed by Frixos Iliadis. It was entered into the 1952 Cannes Film Festival.

== Cast ==
- Irene Papas (as Eirini Pappa) as Lena
- Nikos Tzogias as Petros Petrokostas
- Eleni Zafeiriou as Gianna
- Giannis Argyris as Lambros
- Christina Kalogerikou as Petrokosta
- Lakis Skellas as Giannakos
- Giorgos Foundas as Mathios
- Anthi Miliadi as farmer
- Anny Papageorgiou as farmer
