= Mavrolithari =

Mavrolithari Μαυρολιθάρι
- Community
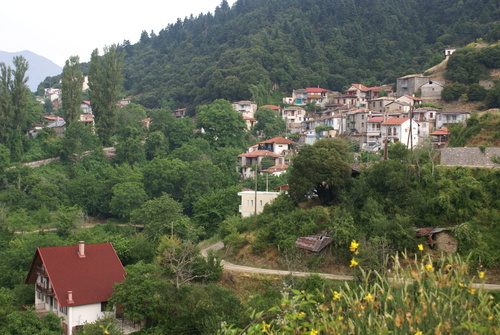

- Location within Greece
- Coordinates: 38°43′N 22°13′E
- Country: Greece
- Administrative region: Central Greece
- Regional unit: Phocis
- Municipality: Delphi
- Elevation: 1,140 m (3,740 ft)

Population (2021)
  - Community: 115
- Time zone: UTC+2 (EET)
  - Summer (DST): UTC+3 (EEST)

Mavrolithari (Greek: Μαυρολιθάρι) is a village on Mount Oeta in northern Phocis, Greece, at an altitude of 1,140 m (3,740 ft). Since the 2011 local government reform it is part of the municipality of Delphi, and the municipal unit of Kallieis. Population was 115 in the 2021 census.

== History ==
Mavrolithari was burnt during the Axis occupation of Greece. During the Italian mopping up operations in May 1943 there was a military campaign by ELAS Ladiou that used Mavrolithari as their base.
