= Nikos Tzogias =

Greek actor (1921–1996)

- Born: 1921; Athens, Greece
- Died: 1 March 1996 (aged 74–75); Athens, Greece
- Occupation: Actor
- Years active: 1949–1987

Nikos Tzogias (Greek: Νίκος Τζόγιας, 1921 – 1 March 1996) was a Greek film actor. He appeared in 26 films between 1949 and 1987.

== Selected filmography ==
- Anthropos yia oles tis doulies (1966) .... Stefanos
- Phaedra (1962) .... Felere
- Dead City (1951) .... Petros Petrokostas
- The Last Mission (1950) .... Nikos Loranis
