= Astero (1959 film) =

1959 film

- Directed by: Dinos Dimopoulos
- Written by: Pavlos Nirvanas; Alekos Sakellarios
- Produced by: Klearhos Konitsiotis
- Starring: Aliki Vougiouklaki
- Cinematography: Dinos Katsouridis
- Edited by: Dinos Katsouridis
- Release date: 23 February 1959
- Running time: 95 minutes
- Country: Greece
- Language: Greek

Astero (Greek: Αστέρω) is a 1959 Greek drama film directed by Dinos Dimopoulos. It was entered into the 9th Berlin International Film Festival.

== Cast ==
- Aliki Vougiouklaki - Astero
- Titos Vandis - Mitros Pithokoukouras
- Dimitris Papamichael - Thymios Pithokoukouras
- Georgia Vasileiadou - Stamatina
- Stephanos Stratigos - Thanos
- Yorgos Damasiotis - Thanasis
- Kostas Papachristos - Mitsos
- Athanasia Moustaka -Pithokoukoura
- Giannis Avlonitis
- Niki Linardou - (as Bebi Koula)
