= Grigoris Grigoriou =

Greek screenwriter and film director

- Born: 16 June 1919; Athens, Greece
- Died: 4 September 2005 (aged 86); Athens, Greece
- Occupations: Director, Writer
- Years active: 1949-1980 (film)

Grigoris Grigoriou (1919–2005) was a Greek screenwriter and film director.

== Selected filmography ==
- Red Cliff (1949)
- Storm at the Lighthouse (1950)
- Bitter Bread (1951)
- The Big Streets (1953)
- The Groaning Lake (1959)

== Bibliography ==
- Vrasidas Karalis. A History of Greek Cinema. A&C Black, 2012.
