= Katerina Yioulaki =

Greek actress (1938–2025)

- Κατερίνα Γιουλάκη
- Born: 27 March 1938; Athens, Greece
- Died: 9 June 2025 (aged 87); Athens, Greece
- Other names: Katerina Yiouvarlaki
- Occupation: Actress
- Years active: 1960–2010
- Spouse: Kimon Dimopoulos (m. 1969; died 2005)
- Children: 1

Katerina Yioulaki (Greek: Κατερίνα Γιουλάκη, born Aikaterini Yiouvarlaki (Αικατερίνη Γιουβαρλάκη); 27 March 1938 – 9 June 2025) was a Greek actress.

== Life and career ==
Yioulaki was born on 27 March 1938 in Athens. She studied at the Dramatic School at the National Theatre of Greece. Her first appearance in the theater was in 1959 with Dinos Iliopoulos in the work I kiria tou kiriou (Η κυρία του κυρίου). She felt that she marked her appearance in TV in the beginning in the 1970s in the show I kokoromiali (Η κοκορόμυαλη), in the mid-1980s with I kiria mas ( Η Κυρία μας) and in 1990–1992 in Retire (reh-tee-reh) with Giannis Dalianidis. She was awarded the Greek Theatrical Writers' Guild Award in 1996.

Yioulaki died on 9 June 2025, at the age of 87. Her death was announced after her remains were cremated on 13 June.

== Filmography ==
=== As an actress ===
Year	Film title (English translation)	Original title and transliteration	Role
1961	Doulepste gia na fate/Haramofaides	Δουλέψτε για να φάτε Χαραμοφάηδες	Amalia
1962	To pithari	Το πιθάρι	Vasso
1962	I gamproi tis Eftychias	Οι γαμπροί της Ευτυχίας	Sophi
1962	I hrissos ke o tenekes	Ο χρυσός και ο τενεκές	Toula
1963	To tihero padaloni	Το τυχερό πανταλόνι The Lucky Pants	wife of Vangelis
1963	Polytehnitis kai erimospitis	Πολυτεχνίτης και ερημοσπίτης	the mother of Giannakis
1963	O filos mou o Lefterakis	Ο φίλος μου ο Λευτεράκης; My Friend Lefterakis	Katina
1963	Afto to kati allo!	Αυτό το κάτι άλλο!	Popi Penari
1963	7 meres psemmata	7 μέρες ψέματα 7 Days of Lies	-
1964	O thalassolykos	Ο θαλασσόλυκος The Sea Wolf	Nora Sgourou
1964	Allos.. gia to ekatommyrio!	Άλλος... για το εκατομμύριο! Somebody for a Millionaire	Lulu
1966	Oi kyries tis avlis	Οι κυρίες της αυλής	Paraskevi
1966	O ti lambei einai chrysos	Ό,τι λάμπει είναι χρυσός When it Shines, it's Gold	Eirini Temboglou
1966	O papatrehas	Ο παπατρέχας	Alexandra Lagou
1967	Ach!.. kai namoun antras	Αχ!.. και νάμουν άντρας	Vasso
1967	O spangoramenos/O spaggoramenos	Ο σπαγγοραμένος	Veta Skoundri
1968	An Italian in Kypseli	Μια Ιταλίδα απ' τη Κυψέλη; Mia Italida ap ti Kypseli	Toula Spanou
1968	Gia mia trypia drachmi	Για μια τρύπια δραχμή	-
1969	Fovatai o Giannis to therio...	Φοβάται ο Γιάννης το θεριό...	kaiti Saltapida
1969	To stravoxylo	Το στραβόξυλο	Ourania Marouli
1970	O Thanassis i Ioulietta kai ta loukanika	Ο Θανάσης η Ιουλιέττα και τα λουκάνικα	Anna
1970	Aristotelis o epipolaios	Αριστοτέλης ο επιπόλαιος	Areti
1971	To koritsaki tis prigkipissas	Το κοροϊδάκι της πριγκηπέσσας	Thodora/Dora Morrou
1971	O katergaris	Ο κατεργάρης	tola Varni
1971	O epanastatis popolaros	Ο επαναστάτης ποπολάρος	Isabella Marineri
1971	Agapissa mia polithrona	Αγάπησα μια... πολυθρόνα	Zeta
1973	O anthropos pou etreche poly	Ο άνθρωπος που έτρεχε πολύ	Tassia
1979	Yinekes sta opla	Γυναίκες στα όπλα	Matina Karazahou
1984	Lalakis o issagomenos	Λαλάκης ο εισαγόμενος	Loula
1984	Thiliko thirotrofio	Θηλυκό θηριοτροφείο	Maratou
1986	Yia ola ftaina ta thilika	Για όλα φταίνε τα θηλυκά	Beba
2010	O diacheiristis/O diahiristis	Ο διαχειριστής The Manager	Violetta Lambrou

== Sources ==
- Theodoros Exarchos, Ellines ithopoioi: "I GENIA MAS" (Έλληνες ηθοποιοί " Η ΓΕΝΙΑ ΜΑΣ = Greek Actors "Our Generations")
