= Stella (1955 film) =

1955 Greek film

- DVD cover
- Directed by: Michael Cacoyannis
- Written by: Iakovos Kambanelis; Michael Cacoyannis
- Starring: Melina Mercouri; Giorgos Fountas; Alekos Alexandrakis
- Music by: Manos Hadjidakis
- Distributed by: Joseph Burstyn Inc. (United States)
- Release date: April 4, 1955
- Running time: 100 minutes
- Country: Greece
- Language: Greek

Stella (Greek: Στέλλα) is a 1955 Greek film retelling Carmen, featuring Melina Mercouri. The film was directed by the Greek Cypriot Michael Cacoyannis and written by Cacoyannis and Iakovos Kambanelis. The music was composed by Manos Hadjidakis and Vassilis Tsitsanis.

Stella was originally intended as a stage play with the title Stella with the Red Gloves, but it was never staged. It has been claimed that this story was the perfect vehicle for the thirty-five-year-old Mercouri's film debut. Indeed, it was the hit that Melina Mercouri needed. The film sparked great controversy, and although it was initially rejected by Greek critics, it has since been considered one of the five greatest Greek films.

At the 1955 Cannes Film Festival, where the film was screened, Melina met Jules Dassin, her future husband, mentor, and director. He helped her to secure major roles in such films as Topkapi, Never on Sunday, Phaedra, and 10:30 P.M. Summer, which became major international successes.

== Plot ==
The story of a fiercely independent and uncompromising young woman. Stella, a rembetiko singer at Paradise nightclub, lives a guiltless, turbulent life. Her innate independence and assertive nature lead her to numerous passionate love affairs. While with Aleko, son of a wealthy family, she decides, as is her habit, to break up before the relationship wears off. Once she meets Miltos, a young soccer player, she seems to change. At first, she avoids his advances, but, later, gives in to him. However, she can only be with him on her own terms. No matter how much she loves him, she mostly values her freedom. Things turn complicated when she is called to choose. She repeatedly rejects Miltos' marriage proposals. When Miltos finally forces her to accept the idea of marriage, Stella does not appear in church, despite Miltos repeatedly warning her that he will kill her if she doesn't marry him. (The wedding day shares a date with the day that Greece rejects Mussolini's demands to let his fascist forces enter Greece.) Miltos kills her with a dagger at the end of the film and awaits his arrest by the police.

== Cast ==
- Melina Mercouri as Stella
- Giorgos Fountas as Miltos
- Alekos Alexandrakis as Alekos
- Christina Kalogerikou as Miltos' Mother
- Voula Zouboulaki as Anetta
- Dionysis Papagiannopoulos as Mitsos
- Sofia Vembo as Maria
- Costas Kakavas as Antonis (as Kostas Karalis)
- Tasso Kavadia as Alekos' Sister
- Michael Cacoyannis as Wedding guest
