= The Ogre of Athens =

O Drákos The Ogre of Athens
- Directed by: Nikos Koundouros
- Written by: Iakovos Kambanellis
- Produced by: Athens Film Company
- Starring: Dinos Iliopoulos; Margarita Papageorgiou; Giannis Argyris
- Cinematography: Costas Theodorides
- Edited by: Giorgos Tsaoulis
- Music by: Manos Hadjidakis
- Release date: 5 March 1956
- Running time: 103 minutes
- Country: Greece
- Language: Greek

O Drákos (Greek: Ο Δράκος; English: The Ogre of Athens or The fiend of Athens), or simply The Dragon, is a 1956 Greek existential and satirical drama crime film, directed by Nikos Koundouros. It tells the story of Thomas, a mousey and dull bank clerk whose physical appearance leads him to be confused with a fierce and notorious criminal. The film highlights as a theme the alienated modern individual and the alienation from the fear imposed by a central government in a social level as well, and encompasses artistically neorealist, expressionist and ancient Greek tragedy features. The film also satirizes the film noir genre. The plot was based on a script by Iakovos Kambanellis, one of Greece's most prominent playwrights, and the music score was written by Manos Hadjidakis with the collaboration of Vasilis Tsitsanis. Although the film was a commercial disaster on its release, it is considered to be one of the most significant works of Modern Greek cinema.

It won the award for best movie 1955–1959 in the first Thessaloniki Film Festival. It also took part in the 17th Venice International Film Festival.

At the 2006 International Thessaloniki Film Festival, the film was announced as among the 10 all-time best Greek films by the PHUCC (Pan-Hellenic Union of Cinema Critics).

== Plot ==
A weak and timid bank employee, Thomas, prepares to spend the New Year's Eve alone when he is horrified to realize that he resembles a famous wanted criminal whom the newspapers call "The Dragon". Due to the misunderstanding, the police chase him and he takes refuge in a cabaret. Amid the ambiguous charm of the night, an underworld gang, treat him as the real Dragon and a dancer, the so-called Carmen, takes a liking on him and protects him. There Thomas meets Roula, the "baby" as they call her, a young girl, orphaned after the bombing of Piraeus, who was picked up by Carmen and taken to the cabaret. The boss, the "Fat Man" as they call him, who is in love with the "baby", scolds her out of jealousy and won't let her leave his control. She herself is innocent, with a pure, almost childlike soul and wishes to leave the cabaret and the underworld, in which she is forced to live. Thomas and Roula are immediately attracted to each other, as they are both pure and lonely souls.

Thomas identifies with his new role, that of "Dragon", the leader of the gang. Their goal is to steal and sell one of the pillars of the temple of Olympian Zeus to an interested American buyer. Thomas has moral qualms that prevent him from participating in the theft of antiquities. Ultimately he is convinced and follows the role he was given. Thomas and the "baby" spend New Year's Day together. They roam the streets of Athens happy and carefree, far from the sinful atmosphere of the cabaret. That same night Thomas is arrested by the police, who believe they have captured the real "Dragon". Identification is done at the police station. He is not the "Dragon" but an ordinary man who bears a resemblance to the villain. He is released.

Meanwhile, the cabaret people learn of their leader's arrest. The Fat Man, the owner of the cabaret, decides: The business will be done even under these circumstances. The "Dragon" cannot be captured. "He will eat the iron bars away and escape". And then Thomas appears. They welcome him with celebration. The gang prepares for the mission by drinking and dancing an imposing, heavy zeibekiko dance. Everyone talks about their needs, the ones that will be satisfied if the business succeeds. The outlaws' dance, wishes and prayers take the form of a ritual. Everyone is pinning their hopes on the "Dragon". However his true identity is revealed just before dawn and he is tragically murdered by the gang.

== Cast ==
- Dinos Iliopoulos as Thomas
- Margarita Papageorgiou as Babe
- Giannis Argyris as Fatman
- Thanasis Veggos as Spathis
- Maria Lekaki as Carmen
- Theodoros Andrikopoulos
- Andreas Douzos
- Anestis Vlahos
- Frixos Nassou
- Zannino

== Trivia ==
The movie is mentioned (and plays an important role) in Jonathan Franzen's novel Freedom, with the title The Fiend of Athens.
