= Christina Kalogerikou =

Greek actress

- Born: 1885; Greece
- Died: 3 November 1968; Greece
- Occupation: Actress

Christina Kalogerikou (Greek: Χριστίνα Καλογερίκου; 24 February 1885 – 3 November 1968) was an actress which she was awarded for her work in the theatre. She is descended from an acting family and acted at the National Theatre.

== Biography ==
Christina Kalogerikou was born in 1885 and was the daughter of Pantelis Roussos and his wife Elpiniki. The two sisters, Evangelia and Anthi did a great career as character actors in the Greek theatre. Anthi was the first wife of Nikos Miliadis, father of celebrated actor Takis Miliadis.

She married Nikolaos Koukoulas and afterwards married her second husband Panos Kalogerikos. It is believed that she married Marios Paleologos.

She was decorated as actor with Taxiarchis Evpiias. Kalogerikou died in 1968.

== Artwork presentation ==
She played mostly in roles at the National Theatre. After World War II, she left and starred herself in movies with her most popular role was the mother of Giorgos Foudas and the noted father in-law of Melina Mercouri in Stella by Michael Cacoyannis, she starred in To Amaxaki in 1955 by Dinos Dimopoulos, she played a part in the bankrupt leader, on the side of Orestis Makris and Vasilis Avlonitis.

== Filmography ==
Year	Title	Role	Notes
1917	O aniforos tou Golgotha	Maria Magdalena	
1951	Nekri politeia	Mrs. Petrokosta	
1954	O dromos me tis akakies	Mrs. Petri	
1955	Stella	Miltos' Mother	
1955	O agapitikos tis voskopoulas		
1957	To amaxaki		
1958	Makrya ap' ton kosmo	Abbess	(final film role)

== Sources ==
- Antonis Prekas, Like the Old Cinema (Σαν Παλιό Σινεμά = San Palio Sinema), Syghronoi Orizontes, 2003 pg 197-98
