= Iakovos Kambanellis =

Greek poet and playwright

Iakovos Kampanellis
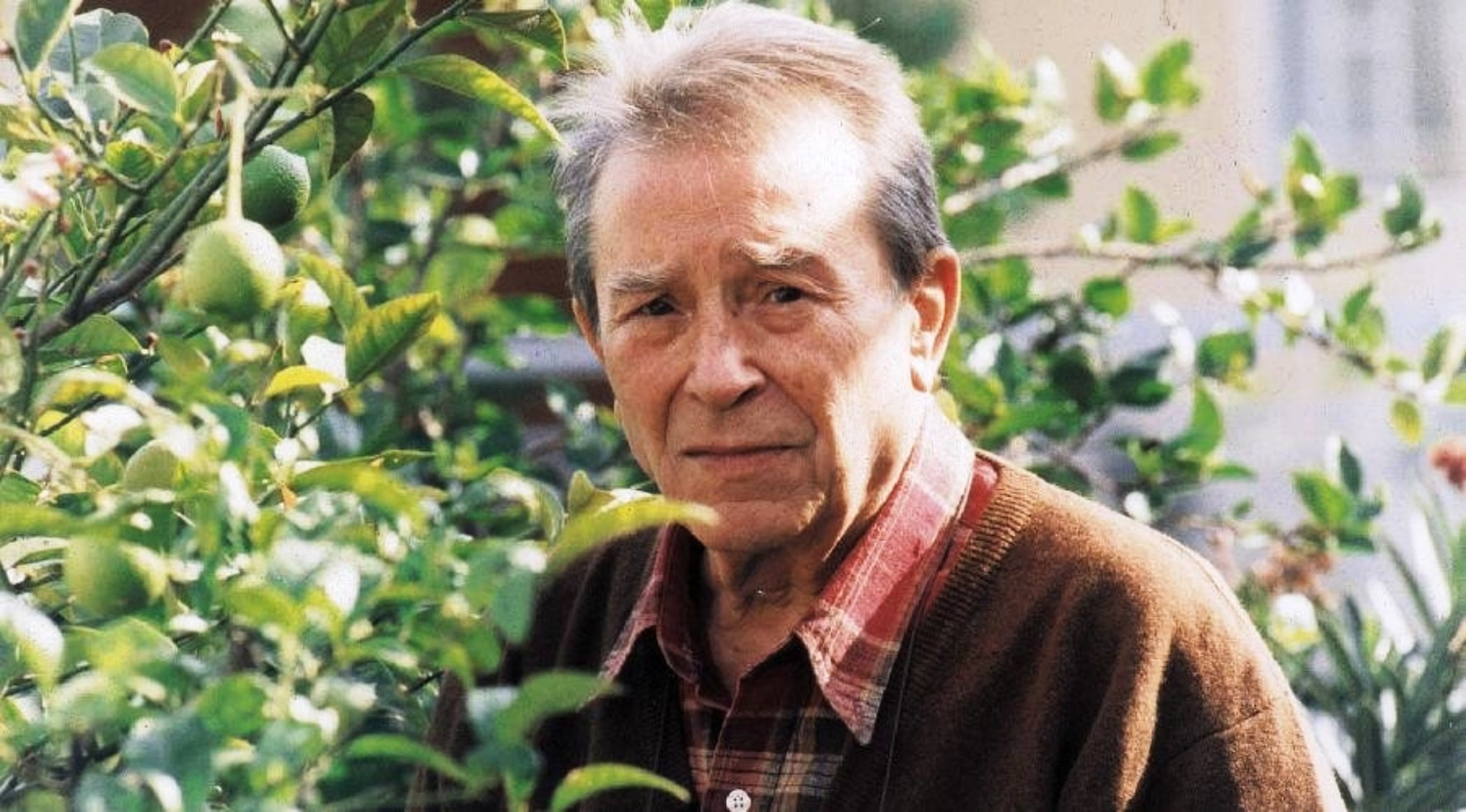
- Born: 2 December 1921; Naxos, Greece
- Died: 29 March 2011 (aged 89); Athens, Greece
- Occupation: Writer
- Known for: "Mauthausen Trilogy"
- Website: Official website

Iakovos Kambanellis (Greek: Ιάκωβος Καμπανέλλης; 2 December 1921 – 29 March 2011) was a Greek poet, playwright, screenwriter, lyricist, and novelist.

== Biography ==
Born 2 December 1921 in Hora on the island of Naxos, the sixth of nine children of Stefanos Kampanellis, an experienced pharmacist, and Aikaterini Laskari. His father came from Chios, while his mother came from an old noble family in Istanbul. Iakovos Kambanellis appeared as one of the most prominent Greek playwrights of the 20th century and he is considered to be the father of modern Greek theater. As a survivor of the Mauthausen-Gusen concentration camp, he wrote the lyrics of the "Mauthausen Trilogy" with music by Mikis Theodorakis. He has also written a memoir known as Mauthausen describing his experiences from the concentration camp. He wrote the scripts of at least 12 films and he directed three of them. In addition, he is well known as a lyricist, having written the lyrics for more than 100 songs. He was a member of the board of the Cultural Foundation of the National Bank of Greece (MIET – Morfotiko Idryma Ethnikis Trapezis), along with some of the most prominent Greek artists. From 1981 to 1987, he was Director of the Radio section of the Greek National Broadcasting Company (E.R.T.). In 2000 he was elected member of the Academy of Athens. The same year he was awarded the medal of the Order of Phoenix by the President of the Greek Republic.

== Death ==
Kambanellis was rushed to the hospital on 4 February 2011 due to complications of his long-term kidney failure. At the age of 89, he died on 29 March 2011 from kidney failure, nine days after his wife's death.

== Theatre ==
Year	Transliteration	Title	Performed at
1950	Choros pano sta stachya	Χορός πάνω στα στάχυα Dance upon the Cobs	Adamandios Lemos Company
1955–56	Evdomi mera tis dimourgias	Έβδομη μέρα της δημιουργίας Seventh Day of Creation	National Theatre, 2nd stage
1957	Aftos kai to panteloni tou	Αυτός και το παντελόνι του He and his pants	Vassilis Diamantopoulos
1957	I kryfi zoi tou Warren Mitty	Η κρυφή ζωή του Γουώρεν Μήττυ; The secret life of Warren Mitty	Vassilis Diamantopoulos
1957–58	I Avli ton Thavmaton	Αυλή των Θαυμάτων; The Courtyard of Miracles	Art Theatre
1958–59	I ilikia tis nihtas	Η ηλικία της νύχτας The Age of Night	Art Theatre
1959	O Gorillas ke i Ortansia	Ο Γορίλας και η Ορτανσία; The Gorilla and the Hydrangea	Elsa Verghi Theater Company
1959–60	Paramythi choris onoma	Παραμύθι χωρίς Όνομα; Fairy tale without a Name	Vasslis Diamantopoulos New Theatre
1963–64	Geitonia ton angelon	Γειτονιά των αγγέλων Neighborhood of Angels	Karezis' Company
1966–67	Viva Aspasia	Βίβα Ασπασία " Long live Aspasia"	Karezis' Company
1966–67	Odyssea gyrise spiti	Οδυσσέα γύρισε σπίτι Ulysses, come home	Art Theatre
1970–71	Apikia ton timorimenon	Αποικία των τιμωρημένων Colony of the Punished	Marietta Rialdi Experimental Theatre
1971–72	Aspasia	Ασπασία; Aspasia	Karezi-Kazakos Company
1972–73	To megalo mas tsirko	Το μεγάλο μας τσίρκο Our Great Circus	Karezi-Kazakos Company
1974	To kouki kai to revythi	Το κουκί και το ρεβύθι The Chickpea and the Broad Bean	Karezi-Kazakos Company
1975	O ehthros Laos	Ο εχθρός λαός The Rival People	Karezi-Kazakos Company
1976–77	Prossopa yia violi ke orhistra	Πρόσωπα για βιολί και ορχήστρα Characters For Violin And Orchestra	Art Theatre
1978–79	Ta tessera podia tou trapeziou	Τα τέσσερα πόδια του τραπεζιού The Four Legs of the Table	Art Theatre
1981	O babas o polemos	Ο μπαμπάς ο πόλεμος Daddy War	Art Theatre
1988	O aoratos Thiasos	Ο αόρατος Θίασος; The Invisible Troupe	National Theatre

== Cinema ==
He wrote several scripts for films including:

- Stella directed by Michael Cacoyiannis
- O Drakos (The Ogre of Athens) directed by Nikos Koundouros
- Arpagi tis Persefonis (The Siege of Persephone) directed by Grigoris Grigoriou
- To kanoni kai t'aïdoni (The Cannon and the Nightingale) directed by himself and Giorgos Kampanellis

Many of his plays are translated in several languages and produced in countries all over the world: in Austria, Bulgaria, Iran, England, Germany, Hungary, Romania, U.S.A., Russia, China, Norway and Sweden. His plays translated in Iran by Reza Shirmarz, famous playwright, translator, author and researcher, have been republished several times in a short time. He worked as a journalist in newspapers Eleftheria (1963–65), Anendotos (1965–66) and Nea (1975-1980). He has been a member of the Greek Theatre Writers' Company.
