= Tasso Kavadia =

Greek actress

- Τασσώ Καββαδία
- Born: 10 January 1921; Palaio Faliro, Greece
- Died: 18 December 2010 (aged 89); Athens, Greece
- Occupation: Actress
- Years active: 1954–2009

Anastasia (Tasso) Kavadia (Greek: Τασσώ Καββαδία; 10 January 1921 – 18 December 2010) was a Greek film and television actress.

== Biography ==
Born in Palaio Faliro in 1921, from 1954 until 1967 Tasso Kavvadia worked as a radio journalist and radio executive. From 1955 until 1969, she was a newspaper reporter.

Kavvadia died on 18 December 2010 in Athens and was buried in the First Cemetery of Athens.

== Filmography ==
Year	Title	Greek title	Role	Notes
1954	Kyriakatiko xypnima	Κυριακάτικο ξύπνημα	Liza Karagianni	
1955	Stella	Στέλλα	sister of Alekou	
1955	Katadikasmeni ki ap' to paidi tis	Καταδικασμένη κι απ' το παιδί της		
1958	Vacation in Egina	Διακοπές στην Αίγινα; Diakopes stin Aigina	Titina	
1960	To klotososkoufi	Το κλωτσοσκούφι	Ourania	
1960	To megalo kolpo		Sofia Karanasi	
1960	Eroika	Ερόικα		
1962	Phaedra	Φαίδρα		
1962	O tritos dromos			
1964	Enas megalos erotas	Ένας μεγάλος έρωτας	Athina	
1965	And the Wife Shall Revere Her Husband		Aglaia Papamitrou	
1965	History of a Life	Ιστορία μιας ζωής Istoria mias zois		
1965	O metanastis			
1965	Istoria mias zois		Mikes' sister	
1965	Dyskoloi dromoi	Δύσκολοι δρόμοι		
1965	Angeloi horis ftera			
1966	Stefania	Στεφανία	jailed journalist	
1966	Hameni eftyhia		Eleni's mother	
1966	Koinonia, ora miden		Mother	
1966	Mazi sou, gia panta			
1966	Aharisti			
1967	Dakria orgis	Δάκρυα οργής	mother of Manos	
1968	Olga My Love	Όλγα αγάπη μου Olga agapi mou	Elena	
1968	Poly arga gia dakrya	Πολύ αργά για δάκρυα Katakouzinou		
1968	I epistrofi tis Mideias			
1968	Kapetan fantis bastouni	Καπετάν φάντης μπαστούνι	Vassiliki	
1968	As me krinoun oi gynaikes			
1969	Kynigimeni prosfygopoula			
1969	Wake Up, Vassilis!	Ξύπνα, Βασίλη! Xypna, Vassili!	Mrs. Farlakou	
1969	I kravgi mias athoas			
1969	I diki enos athoou			
1969	Filise me, prin fygeis gia panta			
1970	A Lazy, Lazy Forty-Year-Old Woman	Μια τρελή τρελή σαραντάρα Mia treli terli sarantara	Aimilia	
1971	O aittitos			
1971	Phrenitis	Φρενίτις; Frenitis	Rea	
1972	I amartia tis omorfias		Mother	
1972	Pio trelloi ki ap' tous trellous			
1972	Answers	Αναζήτησις; Anazitissis	Natassa	
1975	To hroniko mias Kyriakis			
1975	O gios mou o Stefanos	Ο γιος μου ο Στέφανος; Stefanos, My Son	Zoi	
1992	Donoussa	Δονούσα	Sophia	
1996	Heading for Freedom	Προς την ελευθερία Pros tin eleftheria		
1997	Lost Nights	Χαμένες νύχτες Hamenes nihtes	Tante	
1998	Patagonia	Παταγονία		Short
1999	Ladies' Company	Θηλυκή εταιρεία	Stamata	
2000	Greek Fear	Φοβού τους Έλληνες	grandma Maria	
2001	Alexandros and Iseh?	Αλέξανδρος και Αϊσέ		
2009	I diathiki tou ierea Jean Meslier			(final film role)

== Television ==
Year	Film	Greek title	Broadcaster
-	O spagkoramennos	Ο σπαγκοραμμένος	-
-	Taverns	Ταβέρνα; Taverna	-
1991-93	O chiros, i chira kai ta cheirotera	Ο χήρος, η χήρα και τα χειρότερα	ANT1
1993-94	Gigas motel	Γίγας μοτέλ	Mega
1999–2000	Anischyra psefdi	Ανίσχυρα ψεύδη	ET1
2000-01	Grandpas in Action	Παππούδες εν δράσει Pappoudes en drasei	ET1
2001-02	For a Woman and a Car	Για μια γυναίκα και ένα αυτοκίνητο Gia mia gynaika kai ena aftokinito	ANT1
