= Giannis Argyris =

Greek actor

- Born: 1918; Schimatari, Greece
- Died: 23 July 1993 (aged 74–75)
- Occupation: Actor
- Years active: 1951–1992

Giannis Argyris (Greek: Γιάννης Αργύρης; 1918 – 23 July 1993) was a Greek actor. He appeared in a number of films from 1951 to 1992.

== Filmography ==
Year	Title	Role	Notes
1951	I lykaina	Manousos	
1951	Dead City	Lambros	
1953	The Big Streets	Thomas Gerasimou	
1953	Brosta sto Theo	Dimitris	
1955	Joe the Menace	boss	
1955	Dva zrna grozdja		
1955	To organaki tou Attik	Melpo's father	
1956	The Ogre of Athens	Hondros	
1956	Grafeio synoikesion	Pipis	
1957	To paidi tou dromou	Faidonas	
1958	Erotas stous ammolofous	Father	
1959	San theli i nyfi kai o gabros		
1959	Gia tin agapi tis voskopoulas		
1960	Eimai athoos	Emile Zola	
1961	Antigone	sentry	
1961	To spiti tis idonis		
1961	Matomena stefana	Stamos	
1961	Karagouna	Fotis	
1962	Katigoroumenos... o eros	Gerasimos Lahanatos	
1962	Despo	Giorgaras	
1963	To tyhero pantaloni	Policeman	
1963	O ippolytos kai to violi tou	Agisilaos	
1963	Ligo prin ximerosei	Theios	
1963	Gia tin agapi tou paidiou mou	Antonis	
1964	Se poion na po ton pono mou	Mr. Maris	
1964	Mas enonei o ponos	Markos	
1964	I modistroula		
1964	I diki sou moira me sernei	Mihalis Vasileiadis	
1964	Dromos horis synora		
1964	Aftoi pou xehasan to Theo	Argyris	
1965	I moira tou athoou	Nikolas	
1965	Me potises farmaki		
1965	Ftohologia	Keti's father	
1966	To spiti ton anemon	Argyris Iordanidis	
1966	Louiza		
1966	Amartoles tis nyhtas		
1967	Kontserto gia polyvola		
1967	Trellos, palavos kai Vengos	Taxi Driver	
1967	To hrima itan vromiko	Giannis	
1967	Thanos and Despina	Haralambos	
1967	Matomeni gi		
1968	To syrtaki tis amartias		
1968	O timios dromos		
1968	I zoi enos anthropou		
1968	Agapi kai aima	Nestoras Gerakas	
1969	To koritsi tou '17		
1969	The Fairy and the Man	Vrontakis	
1969	Ston daskalo mas... me agapi	Thanasis Liapis	
1969	I arhontissa tou limaniou	Stathis	
1970	Visibility Zero	President of the judicial investigation commission	
1970	En onomati tou nomou	Forensic Surgeon	
1970	O Astrapogiannos	Konstadis Velousis	
1970	I antarsia ton 10		
1970	I zoi mou, sta heria sou	Nikitas	
1971	Abuse of Power	boss	
1971	Dakrya gia enan aliti		
1972	Proklisis		
1973	Asterismos tis parthenou	Boulis	
1973	To koritsi kai t' alogo	Alexis	
1973	Pavlos Melas		
1980	O gyrologos		
