= Giorgos Fountas =

Greek actor and filmmaker (1925–2010)

- Γιώργος Φούντας
- Born: Georgios Fountas; 13 February 1924; Mavrolithari, Greece
- Died: 28 November 2010 (aged 86); Glyfada, Greece
- Resting place: First Cemetery of Athens
- Citizenship: Greece
- Education: Athens Conservatoire
- Occupations: Actor; film director; producer; screenwriter
- Years active: 1944–1997
- Employer: Finos Film
- Spouses: Eleni Episkopou (m. 1947, divorced) Chrysoula Zoka (m. 1965)
- Children: 3
- Awards: Thessaloniki Film Festival (1966, 1967)

Georgios Fountas (Greek: Γεώργιος Φούντας; 13 February 1924 – 28 November 2010) was a Greek actor and filmmaker.

== Biography ==
Fountas was born on 13 February 1924, in Mavrolithari.

He attended the Dramatic School at the Athens Odeum. He appeared for the first time in the theatre in Nyfiatiko tragoudi ("Bridal Song") and his first film in 1944. He was awarded at the Thessaloniki Film Festival in 1966 and 1967 for his participation in his films With the Shine in the Eyes and Fever on the Road.

He remained popular and he is best remembered for his role in the movie Stella with Melina Mercouri where he pronounced one quote, which was satirized in the movie Straight Story in 2006.

Fountas married Eleni Episkopou in 1947 and that had two children, Tzella (b. 1950), and Thymios (b. 1952). His second wife was the famous dancer Chrysoula Zoka (1931–2015), whom he met in 1954 and they fell in love with each other. They finally married in 1965 and had a son, Panos (b. 1969). Chrysoula died of cancer on 12 April 2015, at age 84. She was buried on 14 April 2015, at the New Cemetery of Glyfada.

Fountas died at Mediterraneo Hospital, in Glyfada, on 28 November 2010, at age 86. In the last years of his life he suffered from Alzheimer's disease. He was buried two days later at the First Cemetery of Athens.

== Filmography ==
=== Films ===
Year	Title	Transliteration and translation	Role	Notes
1944	Katadromi sto Aigaion	Καταδρομή στο Αιγαίον; A route in the Aegean		
1946	Katadromi sto Aigaion			
1951	Dead City	Nekri politeia	Mathios	
1951	Pikro psomi		Giangos Lyberis	Uncredited
1952	Mavri gi		Dimitris	
1954	A Girl from the Neighborhood	Το Κορίτσι της Γειτονιάς; To Koritsi tis Geitonias	Spyros	
1954	O Anemos tou Misous	Ο Άνεμος του Μίσους	Kosmas Bertsos	
1954	Gynaikes dichos antres	''Γυναίκες δίχως Άντρες	Zanis	
1954	Open Sea	Ανοιχτή Θάλασσα; Anihti thalasa	Kostandis	
1955	Stella	Στέλλα	Miltos	
1955	Magic City	Μαγική πόλη Mayiki poli	Mitros	
1956	Assoi tou Gipedou	Άσσοι του Γηπέδου		
1956	A Girl in Black		Hristos	
1957	I Limni ton Pothon	Η Λίμνη των Πόθων	Hristos Razis	
1958	Only for a Night	Μόνο για μια Νύχτα; Mono gia mia nychta	Dimitris Sergiou	
1958	Gerakina/Yerakina	Γερακίνα	Giannos	
1959	I zavoliara	Η Ζαβολιάρα	Lambros Desillas	
1960	Never on Sunday	Ποτέ την Κυριακή; Pote tin kyriaki/kiriaki	Tonio	
1960	Pothoi sta Stachya	Πόθοι στα Στάχυα	Thanos	
1960	I Avgi tou Thriamvou	Η Αυγή του Θριάμβου		
1960	Antio zoi		Dimitris Vergis	
1960	An ixeres pedi mou	Αν ήξερες Παιδί μου If You Knew, My Kid		
1962	Poliorkia		Resistant	
1962	I katara tis mannas		Tasos	
1962	Litrose me agapi mou	Λύτρωσέ με Αγάπη μου	Memas	
1962	Prodomeni agapi	Προδομένη Αγαπη	Stratos	
1962	I megali thissia	Η μεγάλη Θυσία		
1963	Coward	Κάθαρμα	Manos Apostolidis	
1963	The red lanterns	Τα κόκκινα Φανάρια; Ta kokkina fanaria	Mihailos	
1963	America, America	Αμέρικα Αμέρικα		Uncredited
1963	Siege	Πολιορκία	Alexis Romanos	
1964	O krahtis	Ο Κράχτης	Tasos Kagiapis	
1964	Alexis Zorbas	Αλέξης Ζορμπάς	Mavrandoni	
1964	To koritsi tis Kyriakis		Miltos	
1964	Kravgi	Κραυγή	Giorgos Merkos	
1964	Anemostrovilos		Andreas Vardis	
1965	O epanastatis		Giorgos	
1966	I stigmatismeni	Οι Στιγματισμένοι	Giorgos Floras	
1966	Me ti lampsi sta matia	Με τη Λάμψη στα Μάτια; With the Shine in the Eyes	Nikolas Dakas	
1966	Johnny/Giannis the Fisher	Ο Ψαρόγιαννος; O Psaroyannos	Psarogiannos	
1967	Fever on Pavement	Πυρετός στην Άσφαλτο; Pyretos stin asfalto	Officer Merkos	
1967	Trouba '67	Τρούμπα `67	Argyris	
1967	O anakatosouras			Uncredited
1968	Poly arga gia dakrya	Πολύ αργά για Δάκρυα	Petros Mandas	
1969	The Refugee	Ο Πρόσφυγας; O Prosfygas	Giorgos / Leonis Skoutaris	
1969	O Antartis tou Valtou	Ο Αντάρτης του Βάλτου	Thanasis Vardas	
1969	I leoforos tis prodosias		Major Alexandros Vergos	
1969	Asteria sto vourko tis akolasias			
1970	O megalos enohos	Ο μεγάλος Ένοχος	Hristos Notaras	
1980	Exodos Kindynou	Έξοδος Κινδύνου	Markos Angelou	
1981	17 sfaires gia enan angelo		Notis	
1986	A Girl from Mani	Το κορίτσι της Μάνης; To koritsi tis Manis	Panagos	
1987	Molismena idata	Μολυσμένα ύδατα		Short
1993	Galini	Γαλήνη	Fotis Glaros	
1997	Gentlemen from the Sea	Λεβέντες της Θάλασσας; Leventes tis thalassas		(final film role)

=== Television ===
Year	Title	Transliteration and translation	Role	Notes
1973	Occupation	Κατοχή; Katohi	Giorgos	
1975	Christ Recrucified	Ο Χριστός ξανασταυρώνεται	Panagiotaros	17 episodes
1976	Galini	Γαλήνη	Fotis Glaros	
1978	Exodos kindynou	Έξοδος κινδύνου Dangerous Exits	Markos	
1985	Ston argaleio tou fengariou	Στον αργαλειό του φεγγαριού	Father	
1993	Gova stileto	Γόβα στιλέτο		

== Awards ==
Awards
Year	Award	Film	Result
1966	Thessaloniki Festival Award for best actor	Me ti Lampsi sta Matia	Won
1966	Thessaloniki Festival Award for best actor	Pyretos stin Asphalto	Won
