= Dionysis Papagiannopoulos =

Greek actor and comedian (1912–1984)

- Born: 12 July 1912; Diakopto, Achaea, Greece
- Died: 13 April 1984 (aged 71); Athens, Greece
- Military career
- Allegiance: Greece
- Branch: Hellenic Army
- Service years: 1940–44
- Rank: Lieutenant

Dionysis Papagiannopoulos (Greek: Διονύσης Παπαγιαννόπουλος; 12 July 1912 – 13 April 1984) was a Greek actor. He was born in Diakopto in the northeastern part of Achaea in 1912. He studied at the Drama School of the National Theatre of Greece (Ethniko Theatro) in Athens and made his stage debut in 1938, appearing as the Knight in William Shakespeare's King Lear. He excelled in Shakespeare's Hamlet as the Grave Digger and in Dimitris Psathas' Fonazei o Kleftis as General Solon Karaleon.

== Stage and screen ==
Dionysis Papagiannopoulos acted in all types of plays and appeared in more than 120 films in supporting and leading roles. One of his leading roles in cinema was O Kyr Giorgis Ekpaidevetai (Mr. Giorgis is being educated) (1977) which was the last film made by Finos Film and marked the end of an era. He also worked for television. One of his biggest successes was his role once again as Mr Giorgis for the television show Louna Park. He was generally considered as an actor with an enormous talent and incredible acting techniques. He always left a strong impression in all the roles he had, comical and dramatic. Remarkable was his work in the play To Megalo mas Tsirko by Iakovos Kambanelis, in which he portrayed Theodoros Kolokotronis, Eleftherios Venizelos and Karagiozis. Also he left a very good impression for his work in his last film, Voyage to Cythera directed by the famous Theo Angelopoulos.

He died suddenly at the age of 71, in his apartment on Alexandras Avenue, today to the Metro Station Ampelokipoi region, due to a stroke. The people of Diakopto erected a statue in his memory, although, during his life, some had opposed him due to political issues.

== Filmography ==
- Ta paidia tis Athinas (1947) .... Thanos
- Matomena Hristougenna (1951) .... Condemned
- To pontikaki (1954) .... Argyris
- To stavrodromi tou pepromenou (1954)
- Joe the Menace (1955) .... Chimpanzee
- Stella (1955) .... Mitsos
- Dva zrna grozdja (1955)
- Tis tyhis ta grammena (1957)
- Tria paidia Voliotika (1957)
- Opou ftoheia kai filotimo (1957)
- We Have Only One Life (1958) .... Daoglou
- Haroumenoi alites (1958) .... Tenoro de Fiasko
- O anemos tou misous (1958)
- Mia Italida stin Ellada (1958)
- Eglima sto Kolonaki (1959) .... Delios
- Stournara 288 (1959) .... Agisilaos Papafronimopoulos
- Erotikes istories (1959) .... Husband of Lambrini
- O Ilias tou 16ou (1959) .... Labros
- Maiden's Cheek (1959) .... Makrydakis
- O Giannos ki i Pagona (1959)
- O Ali Pasas kai i kyra Frosyni (1959) .... Ali Pasas
- I Liza toskase (1959) .... Mr. Papadeas
- Epistrofi ap' to metopo (1959)
- Enas vlakas kai misos (1959) .... Sotiris Karamaounas
- Bouboulina (1959) .... Mohamed
- To koroidaki tis despoinidos (1960) .... Telis Karalis
- To megalo kolpo (1960) .... Isidoros
- Mia tou klefti (1960) .... Pafsanias
- I Hionati kai ta 7 gerontopallikara (1960) .... Stylianos
- To nisi tis agapis (1960) .... Alexis
- Amartola niata (1960) .... Simademenos
- I zoi mou arhizei me sena (1961) .... Commander
- Myrtia (1961) .... Tsakalos
- Exo oi kleftes (1961) .... Kleanthis Kleftodimos
- Pagida (1962)
- Irthes arga (1962) .... Alexis
- To koritsi tou lohou (1962) .... Vasilis Georgiou
- Ta hristougenna tou aliti (1962) .... Varanis
- Pote de se xehasa (1962) .... Telis
- O andras tis gynaikas mou (1962) .... Psychiatrist
- Klapse, ftohi mou kardia (1962)
- Exomologisis mias miteras (1962) .... Vlasis
- Angeloi tou pezodromiou (1962)
- Agni kai atimasmeni (1962) .... Miranda's Father
- I pseftra (1963) .... Mr. Delipetros
- Enas delikanis (1963) .... Mayor
- Htypokardia sto thranio (1963) .... Mr. Nikiteas
- To gelio vgike ap' ton Paradeiso (1963) .... Xenophon Haritidis
- Skandala sto nisi tou erota (1963)
- Osa kryvei i nyhta (1963)
- O kos pterarhos (1963) .... Karatzovas
- O adelfos mou... o trohonomos (1963) .... Kosmas Karabismanis
- Lola (1964) .... Stelios
- I villa ton orgion (1964) .... Lieutenant
- I soferina (1964) .... Judge
- Despoinis diefthyntis (1964) .... Mr. Thomas Vasileiou
- Oi paides (1964)
- O gyrismos tis manas (1964) .... Zafeiris
- An eheis tyhi (1964) .... Alekos
- Alygisti sti zoi (1964)
- Fonazei o kleftis (1965) .... Solonas Karaleontas
- Mia trelli... trelli oikogeneia (1965) .... Stelios
- Yparhei kai filotimo (1965) .... Thodoros Grouezas
- Merikes to protimoun haki (1965)
- Kane me prothypourgo (1965) .... Kimon
- Ftohos ekatommyriouhos (1965)
- Exileosi (1965)
- Jenny Jenny (1966) .... Kosmas Skoutaris
- Dancing the Sirtaki (1966) .... Lefteris
- Oi kyries tis avlis (1966) .... Nondas
- O xypolytos pringips (1966) .... Klearhos
- Oloi oi andres einai idioi (1966) .... Menelaos
- O babas mou, o teddyboys (1966) .... Mr. Foteinos
- I adelfi mou thelei xylo (1966) .... Mr. Fragopoulos
- Fouskothalassies (1966) .... Nikolis Sfakianos
- Ah! Kai na 'moun andras (1966) .... Othon Belalis
- 5.000 psemmata (1966) .... Aristeidis Fesarlis
- Gabros ap' to Londino (1967) .... Kyriakos
- O ahortagos (1967) .... Mihalis Kapantais
- Kati kourasmena pallikaria (1967) .... Dr. Spiros
- O gabros mou, o proikothiras (1967) .... Eftichios Chrysos
- I paihnidiara (1967) .... Yakoumis Lorentzos
- Gia tin kardia tis oraias Elenis (1967) .... Kleon Karamouzis
- Erotes sti Lesvo (1967)
- An milouse to parelthon mou (1967) .... Leonidas Stergiou
- O pseftis (1968) .... Thomas Argyriou
- To kanoni kai t' aidoni (1968) .... Triandafyllou
- O Mikes pantrevetai (1968) .... Panagiotis Sinaxaridis
- Enas ippotis gia ti Vasoula (1968) .... Captain Fatouros
- Mermaids and Rascals (1968) .... Mr. Athanasiou
- Gia poion htypa i... koudouna (1968) .... Apostolis Labirikos
- I arhontissa ki o alitis (1968) .... Mr. Katsaros
- Poly arga gia dakrya (1968) .... Mr. Menandros
- Oikogeneia Horafa (1968) .... Deranged Scientist
- Enas kleftis me filotimo (1968) .... Thanasis
- Empaine, Kitso! (1968)
- Doktor Zi-Vengos (1968) .... Apostolos
- O gois (1969) .... John Christian
- I neraida kai to palikari (1969) .... Fourtounakis
- Xypna, koroido (1969) .... Kyriakos Balores
- To nyfopazaro (1969)
- O anthropos pou gyrise apo ta piata (1969) .... Spyros Lounas
- Gia ena tagari dollaria (1969) .... Jenny's Father
- Gabros ap' ti Gastouni (1969) .... Periklis Karabisbikis
- Ena asyllipto koroido (1969) .... Mr. Haroupoglou
- Zitountai gabroi me proika (1970) .... Evripidis Strouthambelos
- Trella koritsia, apithana agoria (1970) .... Nionios Hionatos
- O trellos tis plateias Agamon (1970) .... John Agras
- Omorfes meres (1970) .... Pantelaras
- O daskalakos itan leventia (1970) .... Babis Hanos
- O apithanos (1970) .... Thomas Karalis
- Natane to 13 napefte se mas! (1970) .... Tzevelakos
- Giakoumis, mia romeiki kardia (1970) .... Grantis
- Enas hippis me tsarouhia (1970) .... Pelopidas
- O epanastatis popolaros (1971) .... Dimaras
- Kafta... psyhra ki anapoda (1971) .... Kleanthis Toboglou
- I zavoliara (1971)
- Enas xenoiastos palaviaris (1971) .... Nikiforos
- Diakopes stin Kypro mas (1971) .... Hatzigiannis
- Lysistrata (1972) .... Provoulos
- O magas me to trikyklo (1972) .... Papanastasiou
- Yperohes nyfes... koroida gabroi! (1972) .... Arhelaos
- Pio trelloi ki ap' tous trellous (1972) .... Pelopidas
- O Patouhas (1972) .... Saitonikolis
- O monahogios mou o... agathiaris (1972) .... Kleanthis
- An imoun plousios! (1972) .... Aristeidis Tsitsis
- O tsarlatanos (1973) .... Mpalamoutis
- Louna Park, To (1974, TV Series) .... Kyr-Yorgis
- Enas nomotagis politis (1974)
- O Kyr Giorgis ekpaidevetai (1977) .... Giorgis Kollas
- Kathenas me tin trella tou (1980) .... Iordanis
- Koroido Romie! (1981) .... Fotis Firikis
- Voyage to Cythera (1984) .... Antonis (final film role)
