= Nikos Tsiforos =

Greek screenwriter

Nikos Tsiforos Νίκος Τσιφόρος
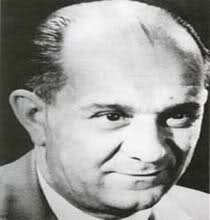
- Born: 27 August 1912; Alexandria, Egypt
- Died: 6 August 1970 (aged 57); Athens, Greece
- Occupations: Screenwriter, film director
- Years active: 1948–1970

Nikos Tsiforos (Greek: Νίκος Τσιφόρος; 27 August 1912 – 6 August 1970) was a Greek humorist, screenwriter, and film director. He had more than 60 film scripts to his credit between 1948 and 1970. He further directed 17 films between 1948 and 1961.

== Biography ==
Tsiforos was born in Alexandria, Egypt, in 1912; two years later, his family permanently resettled in Athens. He began writing at age 11, and in 1938, he wrote his first play, which was performed in an outdoors theatre in Freattyda. He went on to earn a degree in law, and work for two years at the Election Supervision Council. He then resigned to travel the seas.

He continued switching jobs periodically until 1939 while writing film scripts as well as doing other types of writing. His first major success was in 1944, when the company of Dimitris Horn and Mairi Aroni staged one of his plays, "Η Πινακοθήκη των Ηλιθίων" (The portrait gallery of dolts). In 1948 and 1949, he scripted and directed his first film, Τελευταία αποστολή (Last Mission).

Tsiforos also worked as a reporter for the Athens press and contributed to newspapers such as Φιλελεύθερος, Βήμα, and Ελεύθερος Κόσμος, as well as magazines like Τραστ, Ρομάντσο, Ταχυδρόμος, and Πάνθεον.

Tsiforos collaborated extensively with Polyvios Vassiliadis on numerous hit film scripts, earning exceptional renown for their scintillating wit and hilarious humor.

His deft use of the Greek contemporary vernacular is considered peerless by several leading literary critics.

== Works ==
- Άνθρωποι και ανθρωπάκια (People and nobodies)
- Η Αθήνα σήμερα - Κρουαζιέρες μέσα στην ιστορία (Athens Today, Cruises in History)
- Όμορφη Θεσσαλονίκη (Beautiful Thessaloniki)
- Τα παιδιά της πιάτσας (The boys of the Hood) Excerpts youtube story
- Διηγήματα (Short stories)
- Εορταστικά (Holiday essays)
- Ο πρώτος Τσιφόρος (Early Tsiforos)
- Μίλων Φιρίκης
- Ελληνική κρουαζιέρα (A Greek Cruise)
- Ελληνική μυθολογία (Greek mythology) Excerpt Excerpt excerpt Excerpt
- Ο Γκιούλιβερ στη χώρα των Γιγάντων - Ο Γκιούλιβερ στη χώρα των νάνων (Gulliver in the Land of the Giants; in the land of the Dwarfs)
- '(Η Ιστορία της Αθήνας (The History of Athens)
- (History of England) Ιστορία της Αγγλίας
- ( History of France) Ιστορία της Γαλλίας
- (History of the United States) Ιστορία των Ηνωμένων Πολιτειών
- Χρονογραφήματα (Newspaper columns)
- Τζιμ κακής ποιότητος (Low quality Jim)
- Οι κονκισταδόροι (The conquistadors)
- Το τυχερό μου αστέρι (My Lucky Star)
- Τα παλιόπαιδα τ' ατίθασα (The frisky hoodlums)
- Εμείς και οι Φράγκοι ( We and the Franks) online
- Παραμύθια πίσω από τα κάγκελα (Tales from behind bars)
- Ο κόσμος κι ο κοσμάκης (The World and the Little People)
- Η πινακοθήκη των ηλιθίων (The Portrait Gallery of Dolts)
- Τα ρεμάλια ήρωες (Heroic Heels)
- Στηβ το χαρούμενο κάθαρμα (Steve, the cheerful scumbag)
- Οι μυστικές εταιρίες ( Secret Companies)
- Βιβλικά χαμόγελα (Biblical smiles)
- Η γυναίκα κουρσάρος (The Woman Pirate)

== Selected filmography ==
Year	Film	Transliteration and translation
1950	The Last Mission	Τελευταία αποστολή Teleftaia apostoli
1951	My kid must live	To paidi mou prepei na zisei Το παιδί μου πρέπει να ζήσει
1953	The Tower of Knights	Ο πύργος των ιπποτών O pirgos ton ipoton
1954	The Little Mouse	Το ποντικάκι To pondikaki
1954	The wind of Hate	Ο άνεμος του μίσους O anemos tou missous
1954	The Belle of Athens	Η ωραία των Αθηνών; I oraia ton Athinon
1955	Partying, Money, and Love	Γλέντι, λεφτά και αγάπη Glendi, lefta ke agapi
1956	Gypsy Blood	Τσιγγάνικο αίμα Tsiganiko ema
1957	The Three Detectives	Τρεις ντετέκτιβς Treis detectives
1957	The Ladies' man	Ο γυναικάς O yinekas
1958	The Fat Cat	Ο λεφτάς O leftas
1959	The Treasure of the Deceased	Ο θησαυρός του μακαρίτη O thisavros tou makariti
1960	Three dolls and I	Τρεις κούκλες κι εγώ Treis koukles ki ego
1960	Clearchos, Marina, and the short guy	Ο Κλέαρχος η Μαρίνα και ο κοντός O Klearchos i Marina kai o kondos
1967	Oh! That Wife of Mine	Αχ αυτή η γυναίκα μου Ach, afti i ghineka mou

== Bibliography ==
- Sylvia Mittler, "The Crusades and Frankish Medieval Greece as (Re)Appropriation: Carnivalesque Historiography and Modern Greek Humorist Nikos Tsiforos." In: Postmodern Medievalisms, ed. Richard Utz and Jesse G. Swan (Cambridge: Brewer, 2004), pp. 209–36.
- Sylvia Mittler, "Subversive Storytelling: Popular Historiography, Alternative Cultural Memory, and Modern Greek Humorist Nikos Tsiforos." In: Oral and Written Narratives and Cultural Identity, ed. Francisco Cota Fagundes and Irene Maria F. Blayer (New York: Peter Lang, 2007), pp. 171–88.
