= Dinos Dimopoulos =

Greek actor

- Born: 22 August 1921; Palairos, Greece
- Died: 28 February 2003 (aged 81); Athens, Greece
- Occupations: Film director, screenwriter, actor, theatre director
- Years active: 1940–1971

Dinos Dimopoulos (Greek: Ντίνος Δημόπουλος; 22 August 1921 – 28 February 2003) was a Greek actor, film director, screenwriter and theatre director. He directed more than 40 films between 1953 and 1993.

His 1959 film Astero was entered into the 9th Berlin International Film Festival. His 1960 film Madalena was entered into the 1961 Cannes Film Festival. He wrote also some theatrical plays. He has won the best director award in Thessaloniki Film Festival for the film The Asphalt Fever.

== Selected filmography ==
- Heaven Is Ours (1953)
- The Big Streets (1953)
- Happy Beginning (1954)
- Joe the Terrible (Τζο ο τρομερός) (1955)
- Astero (1959)
- Stournara 288 (1959)
- Madalena (1960)
- Oi kyries tis avlis (1966)
- The Asphalt Fever (1967)
- A Teacher with Blonde Hair (1969)
- Agapisa mia polythrona (1971)
