= Nora Valsami =

Greek actress (born 1945)

- Νόρα Βαλσάμη
- Born: Eleonora Valsamidou; 24 January 1945 (age 81); Cairo, Egypt
- Citizenship: Egypt (by birthplace); Greece (naturalized)
- Occupations: Actress; dancer
- Years active: 1963–2006
- Employer: Finos Film
- Spouse: Erricos Andreou (m. 1973; died 2023)
- Children: 1

Nora Valsami (Greek: Νόρα Βαλσάμη; born Eleonora Valsamidou, Greek: Ελεονώρα Βαλσαμίδου; born 24 January 1945) is a Greek actress.

== Life and career ==
Eleonora Valsamidou was born on 24 January 1945, in Cairo. Her first stage appearance was in a 1965 production of Aristophanes' tragedy Ecclesiazusae while still a student at the Athens Drama School. Her film acting debut was in Tzeni Tzeni, a 1966 film. Even though she played a minor role in the film she was awarded a contract by Finos Film. In 1975 she retired from films to concentrate on her theatrical career. In the theatre she played the role of the bride in Blood Wedding and also appeared in An Ideal Husband, Barefoot in the Park and other plays. She has also played several roles on TV. She was married to Errikos Andreou, a television film director until his death in 2023.
