= Vangelis Ploios =

Greek actor (1937–2020)

- Born: November 13, 1937; Peristeri, Greece
- Died: February 21, 2020 (aged 82); Athens, Greece
- Occupation: Actor

Vangelis Ploios (Greek: Βαγγέλης Πλοιός; November 13, 1937 – February 21, 2020) was a Greek theatrical, film and television actor.

== Biography ==
He was born in Peristeri northwest of Athens on November 13, 1937. He studied classic ballet at Elli Zouroudi's school. He made his first role in 1953 in the stage of the Rex Theatre in a dancing drama with Elli Zouroudi. He enrolled into the hypocritic by Dimitris Rontiris and phonetic studies and with Joseph Ritsiardis.

In 1956, he started a training as an actor and began his theatrical career.

Between 1998 and 1999, he entered the cycle of theatrical route at the Irodeio with the comedy of Aristophanes.

He also acted in all the roles, proses, operettas, variety, film and television. In 1978, he entered the Gounaraki-Baxter school and directed Peace by Aristophanes (with a children's production by Sofia Zarabouka) and roles with Lilliputian students at that school. His representation was realized at the Akropol theatre with great success.

During the era, his direction worked himself into theatre and in film, with all the great and worthy artists of the time and had a brotherly role with actor Dinos Iliopoulos.

He acted for many years with the theatrical company Vasilis Bournellis at the Akropol (Ippokratous), Bournelli (Alexandras Avenue) and Ethnikos Kipos (Syntagma (Constitution) Square).

He toured across Greece with his own company along with other companies as basically stock. He also toured in Cyprus and Egypt.

He appeared in television with great success in Sto para pente.

He was married with the actress Ria Deloutsi since 1970 and raised a son, Georgios Ploios, who died in a motorcycle accident. In April 2007, Vangelis raised Vangelakis, Jr. who is also his grandson. He died on February 21, 2020.

== Career ==
=== Proses ===
- A musical comedy by Al Breffor, only at the Broadway Theatre
  - Companies: Elli Lambeti, Dinos Iliopoulos, Dimitris Malavetas, Music: Giannis Spanou, Lines: Lefteris Papadopoulos
- A comedy with Étiennes Rennes and Alfred Savoire at the Dionyssia Theater
  - Companies: Dinos Iliopoulos
- A comedy at the Diana Theatre
  - Companies: Nikos Stavridis, Koulis Stoligkas
- Cinderella at the Ethnikos Kipos Theatre
- A play by Moss Hart and George Kaufman (1962–63) at the Diana Theatre
  - Companies: Koulis Stoligkas, Anna Matzourani, Marika Krevata, Nikos Xanthopoulos
  - Role: as Tony
- Another play by Moss Hart and George Kaufman (1995–96) at Ilissia Theatre
  - Companies; Vasia Panagopoulos, D. Iliopoulos, Eleni Anousaki, D. Kallivokas, etc.
  - Role: as an officer
- The Last Fortune by Stefanos Fotiadis at Gloria Theatre
  - Company: D. Iliopoulos
- Vangelis the Coward, by D. Christodoulou at the Dionyssia and Avlea Theatres in Thessaloniki
  - Company: D. Iliopoulos
- Yiannis, Johnny and Ivan by D. Iliopoulou at the Gloria Theatre
  - Company: D. Iliopoulos
- Concerto for a Trombone, by B. Iliopoulou at the Kipou Theater in Thessaloniki
- A play by Georges Feydeau at the Glorka and Chatzokou (Thessaloniki) Theatres
  - Company: D. Iliopoulos
- A play by David Herbert Lawrence at the Chatzokou Theatre in Thessaloniki
  - Companies: Ria Deloutsi-Vangelis Ploios and alongside Dora Anagnostopoulou, Takis Bokalas, Zoi Voudouri and Koastas Fragkiadakis
- A play by Yan ed Nartogue, Periodical
  - Company: Ria Deloutsi-Vangelis Ploios
- A play by Stevens
  - Company: Ria Deloutsi-Vangelis Ploios
- A play by Shirley Hertz at the Chatzokou Theatre in Thessaloniki
  - Companies: Ria Deloutsi-Vangelis Ploios, alongside; Efi Oikonomou, Takis Bokalas, Christos Kritikos
- A play by Marcel Asar at the Dionysia Theatre
  - Company: D. Iliopoulos
- A play at the Dionysia Theatre
  - Company: D. Iliopoulos
- Greece of Arkoudea (Η Ελλάδα του Αρκουδέα = I Ellada tou Arkoudea) by D. Kollatou at the Lusitania Theatre
- Casanova by Giovanni Giacomo Casanova at the Moussouri Theatre
- From Preveza at Sartzetaki (Απ' τον Πρεβέζης στον Σαρτζετάκη) by D. Kollatou at the Moussouri Theatre
- One Sunday in New York by Norman Krasna, at the Anna-Maria Kalouta Theatre
  - Companies: V. Tsiflikas, M, Aliferi, P. Michalopoulos and D. Iliopoulos
- A play by G. Kakoulidis at the Menandreio Theatre (named after Menander) (Delfinario)
  - Companies: Th. Karakatsanis, D. Iliopoulos, S. Kalogirou, S. Fokas, P. Pitsouli, Papamatthaiou, etc.
- La Mama by André Roussain at Ledra Theatre
  - Companies: D. Iliopoulos, Kaiti Papanika, etc.
- A play starring with Diana at Kalouta Theatre
  - Alongside: D. Iliopoulos, Kaiti Lambropoulou, G. Moutsios, M. Chalkia, Giouli Iliopoulou, Sofi Zaninou, etc.

=== Operettas ===
- O vaftistikos (Ο βαφτιστικός) by Theofrastos Sakellaridis at the National Lyric Stage
  - Role: as Soubretou
- I Apahides ton Athinon at Piraeus Theatre
  - Alongside: Menelaos Theofanidis
  - Role: as Katsoulino
- Carmen by Bizet at the National Lyric Stage
  - Role: Dancer, soloist

=== As a reviewer ===
- Let's Visit Cyprus (Πάμε για την Κύπρο = Pame gia tin Kypro) at Papaioannou Theatre
  - With: Kyriakos Mavresa, M. Nezer, Orestis Makris
  - Music: G. Mouzaki, Choreographer: Manolis Kastrinos
- Aspro mavro kai zero (Άσπρο μαύρο και ζερό = Black and White and a Zero) by N. Tsiforou and A. Sakellariou at the Akropol Theatre
  - With: Or. Makris, V. Avlonitis, Kaiti Belinda, G. Vasileiadou, R. Vlachopoulou, N. Rizo, Sper. Vrana, etc.
  - Music: Z. Iakovidis-G. Vella, Choreographer: Manolis Kastrinos
- This Drachma is Yours (Αυτή η δραχμή είναι δική σου = Afti i drachmi einai diki sou) by G. Oikonomidis at the Akropol Theatre
  - With: Georgios Oikonomidis, Chr. Evthymiou, G. Gkonakis, R. Dor, Sper. Vrana, etc.
- Granita kai chonaki (Γρανίτα και χωνάκι) by G. Oikonomdis-Giannakopoulou-Assimaki-Nikolaidi at the Rialto Theatre
  - With: N. Stavridis, K. Chatzichristo, Al. Leivaditis, Kaiti Diridaua, etc.
  - Music: Joseph Ritsiardis, Dancers: Gianni Fleury
- Women and Flowers (Γυναίκες και λουλούδια = Gynaikes kai louloudia by G. Asimakopoulou, V. Spyropoulou, P. Papadakopoulou at the Akropol Theatre
  - With: K. Mavreas, Orestis Makris, V. Avlonitis, G. Vasileiadou
  - Music: Menelaos Theofanidos
- Twenty Theatres Together (Είκοσι θέατρα μαζί = Eikossi theatra mazi) by Asimakopoulos – Spyropoulos – Papadoukas at the Akropol Theatre
  - With: Chr. Efthymidou, R. Vlachopoulou, Kaiti Belinda, G. Gkionakis, S. Vrana, N. Janet, S. Parravas, Dora Giannakopoulou, G. Vogiatzis, etc.
  - Music: L. Markea, Dancers: G. Fleury, Linda Alma, Songs: G. Vogiatzis
- Democracy is Dancing (Η δημοκρατία χορεύει = I dimokratia chorevei) by Al. Sakellarios – G. Giannakopoulos at the Akropol Theatre
  - With: Chr. Efthymiou, R. Vlachopoulou, K. Belinda, G. Gkionakis. Sper. Vrana, Music: L. Markea
- Garden Party with Al. Sakellariou and G. Giannakopoulou at the Akropol Theatre
  - With: R. Vlachopouloum, Chr. Efthymiou, G. Gkionakis, Nini Janet, Spr. Vrana, G, Vogiatzis, Katerina Gogou, etc.
  - Music: G. Markea, Dances: G. Fleury, Linda Alma
- The Astronaut (Η αστροναύτισσα = I astronaftissa) by Il. Limberopoulou at the Bournelli Theatre
  - With: R. Vlachopoulou, P. Pantzas, N. Janet, I. Vogiatzis, Eleni Prokopioum, V Voulgaridis, A Matsas, etc.
  - Music: M. Theofanidis and Go Theodosiadis, Dancers; M. Kastrinos, Director: M, Lygizos
- Athens Las Vegas (Αθήνα Λας Βέγκας = Athina Las Vegas) by Asimakopoulou=Spyropoulou-Papadouka at the Bournelli Theatre
  - With: R. Vlachopoulou, St. Paravas, G Kapis, N Janet, V Voulgaridi, K Gogou, G Papazisis, etc.
  - Music: G. Theodosiadi, Dancers: Manolis Kastrinos
- Mini maxi kai sithrou (Μίνι μάξι και σιθρού) by Lyberopoulos-Nikolaidis at the Akropol Theatre
  - With: G Pantzas, R Vlachopoulou, St. Paravas, G Kapis, N Janet, E Prokopiou, Ria Deloutsi, Sas kastoura, etc.
  - Music: G Theodosiadis, Dancer: Manolis Kastrinos
- Erchontai kai erchontai (Έρχονται δεν έρχονται) by K Nikolaidi-I Liberopoulou at the Ethnikou Kipou Theatre
  - With: Stavros Paravas, Rena Vlachopoulou, E Prokopiou, N Janet, K Dalis, M Metaxopoulos, N Fondanas, G Dalaras, etc.
  - Music: Giorgos Mouzakis,
- Pou tha vroume arhigo, (Πού θα βρούμε αρχηγό = Where I am Going to Find a Leader) and (Katerina, Wake Up) (Κατερίνα ξύπνα = Katerina Xypna) by G Lazaridis and N Eleftheriou
  - With: G Konstantinou, Martha Karagianni, St., Prava, M Demiris, R Deloutsi, G Dalis, A Matsas, I Vogiatzis, etc.
  - Music: L Markea, Dancer: Giannis Fleury
- I Ellas xanapsifizei (Η Ελλάς ξαναψηφίζει = Greece Votes Again) by G Lazaridis and N Eleftheriou at Bournelli Theatre
  - With: Maro Kontou, B Moschona, N Janet, T Miliadis, Vas Tsivlika, N Panastasiou, G Papazissis, D Giannakopoulos, etc.
  - Music: Giorgos Mouzakis and Lykourgos Markeas
- Ti leme akoma dimokratia (Τη λέμε ακόμα δημοκρατία) by G Lazaridis at Kalouta Theatre
  - With: Anna Kalouta, Giannis Michalopoulos, K Stoligka, Kat Gioulaki, Ria Deloutsi, Ilia Logothetis, K Papanika, Th. Katsadramis, etc.
  - Music: Mimis Plessas
- Pou tha paei pou na vgei (Που θα πάει που θα βγεί = Where Are We Going, Were Are We Going Out) by Minis Traiforou at the Paroquet Theatre
  - With: Petros Fyssoun, Beata Assimakopoulou, Ria Deloutsi, Manolis Destounis, Danos Lygizos, Kostas Fyssoun, etc.
  - Music: Vangelis Lykiardopoulou, Director: Mimis Traiforou
- Outside the Teeth (Έξω απ' τα δόντια) and Ta metaxota vrakia... (Τα μεταξωτά βρακιά.....) by Il. Limberopoulos at the Akropol Theatre
  - With: K Hadjihristos, Thanasis Vengos, K Papanika, M Demiris, Souli Sabah, Ria Deloutsi, V Trifyllis, G Malouchos, etc.
  - Music: G Theodosiadis, Director: N Katsouridis
- Ellinides Ellines (Ελληνίδες Έλληνες) by N Eleftheriou and I Liberopoulos at the Bournelli Theatre
  - With Hadjihristos, K Papanikas, Souli Sabah, Ria Deloutsi, V Trifylli, G Malouchos, etc.
  - Music: G Theodosiadis, Director: N Katsouridis
- Enas kosmos koulouvachata (Ένας κόσμος κουλουβάχατα) by Ilia Liberopoulou and S Filippouli at the Akropol Theatre
  - With: St. Paravas, D Stylianopoulou, T Miliadis, B Moschona, Nelly/Nelli Gkini, etc.
  - Music: N Danikas, Dancer: Maria DePetrillo
- Athina mou trelara mou (Αθήνα μου τρελάρα μου) by I Liberopoulos and S Filippoulis at the Bournelli Theatre
  - With: G Pantza, Nora Valsami, B Moschona, T Miliadis, etc.
  - Music: G Mouzakis, Dancing and Director: G Fleury
- Klepsan ta dis ti kalpi na deis (Κλέψαν τα δις την κάλπη να δεις) by Kambanis-Rizos-Romas-Spyropoulos at the Metropolitan Theatre
  - With: D. Iliopoulos, G. Papazissis, Katia Athanassioum, Perzikianidis, N. Tsoukas, M. Chalkia
  - Music: M. Tagkieris, Director: Venieris
- Touvla Lotto kai bourloto (Τούβλα Λόττο και μπουρλότο) by: Spyropoulos-Balafoutis, M. Stoili at the Metropolitan Theatre
  - With D. Iliopoulos, Nikos Rizos, D. Stylianopoulou, S. Tzevelekos
  - Music: Z. Iakovidis, Dancing, Director: D. Metaxopoulou
- Tapi kai psychraimoi (Ταπί και ψύχραιμοι) by Haris Romas-Chatzisofias at the Kalouta Theater
  - With: D. Iliopoulos, H. Romas, Panos Michalopoulos, P, Pitsouli, etc.
  - Music: Loukianos Kilaidonia, Director: N. Zervos
- Give the Cake to the People (Dose tourta sto lao) by N. Eleftheriou and N. Atherinou at the Superstar Theatre
  - With N. Rizos, D. Iliopoulos, Zozo Sapoutzaki, N, Tsouka, And. Douzos, Katia Athanassiou, etc.
  - Music: Z. Iakovidis, Director: N. Atherinos

He participated in many other roles inside and outside Greece

He took part in the International Showbiz Raptis at the Anatolia Theatre in Thessaloniki, next to the internationally renowned Spanish theatre and film star Sarita Montiel (famous in Greece in the movie La Violetera)

- In taverns, Mostros, Plakiotiko Saloni, Gran Chalet, etc., in a revue road with all the worthy people of the nation, and also in refreshments of the time: Armonia, Filadelfeia company, Akron, Ares FIeld (Oikonomidis), etc.

=== Filmography ===
Year	Film	Transliteration and translation	Role	Director
1956	I theia ap' to Chicago	Η θεία απ΄ το Σικάγο; An Aunt from Chicago	-	A. Sakellarios
1956	A Hero in his Slippers	Ένας ήρως με παντούφλες = A Hero With Slippers	-	A Sakellarios
1957	A film by Novak			
1958	Erotic Scandals	Ερωτικά σκάνδαλα Erotika skandala	-	D Athanassiadis
1959	One Cruise for Rhodes	Κρουαζιέρα στη Ρόδο; Krouaziera sti Rodo	-	G Dalianidis
1959	Conversation in Corfu	Ραντεβού στην Κέρκυρα; Randevou sti Kerkyra	-	Dimis Dadiras
1959	O Thimos ta' kane thalassa	Ο Θύμιος τα 'κανε θάλασσα	-	A Sakellarios
1960	Michalis from Skiathos	Ο Μιχάλης ο Σκιαθίτης; O Michalis o Skiathitis	-	Jon Hegram
1960	My Love	Αγαπούλα μου Agapoula mou	-	
1961	You Arrived Late	Ήρθες αργά Irthes arga	-	-
1962	O antartis tou valtou	Ο αντάρτης του βάλτου	-	-
1962	Smart and a Traitor	Έξυπνοι και κορόιδα Exypnoi kai koroida	Christos	C. Apostolou
1962	I assi tis trakas	Οι άσσοι της τράκας	-	Glykofrydi
1963	The Mother's Heart	'Η καρδιά της μάνας I kardia tis manas	-	Errikos Thalassinos
1964	We Were All Liars	Ήταν όλοι τους κορόιδα Itan oloi tous koroida	-	Er. Thalassinos
1964	The Seawolf	Ο θαλασσόλυκος O thalassolykos	-	C Hadjihristos
1965	Einai varys o ponos mou	Είναι βαρύς ο πόνος μου	-	Er Thalassinos
1965	Kalio pende kai sto heri	Κάλιο πέντε και στο χέρι	Fanis	Ch. Apostolou
1966	Paramonoi pothoi	Παράνομοι πόθοι	-	Pavlos Tasios
1966	Pligoses ti agapi mou	Πλήγωσες την αγάπη μου	-	M Nikolopoulos
1967	Patera katse fronima	Πατέρα κάτσε φρόνιμα Daddy Calm Down	-	K Karagiannis
1967	I koroidara	Η κοροϊδάρα The Liar	-	K Karagiannis
1967	O Anakatosouras	Ο Ανακατωσούρας	a friend	G Lazaridis
1968	O pio kalos o mathitis	Ο πιο καλός ο μαθητής	-	K Karagiannis
1969	Which One is Thanassis?	Ποιός Θανάσης	Alekos	T Vengos/Veggos
1970	O Stavros einai poniros	Ο Σταύρος είναι πονηρός	-	O. Kosteletos
1971	Enas xenoiastos palaviaris	Ένας ξένοιαστος παλαβιάρης	-	Er. Thalassinos
1971	The Countess of Corfu	Η κόμισσα της Κέρκυρας; I komissa tis Kerkyras	Drummer	A. Sakellarios
1972	Oi apanthropoi	Οι απάνθρωποι	-	Pavlos Filippou

He also participated in many video and TV movies with Kostas Voutsas, Rena Vlachopoulou, Panos Michalopoulos, Giannis Gkionakis, etc.

=== Television ===
Title	Transliteration and translation	Channel/Production (in italics)
From Comedy to Drama	Από την κωμωδία στο δράμα Apo tin komodia sto drama	ERT
Ap' ton papou sto engono	Απ' τον παππού στον εγγονό From the Grandpa to the Children	YENED
O Dinos sti chora ton thavmaton	Ο Ντίνος στη χώρα των θαυμάτων	Pissanos
These Stars are Shining	Τ' αστέρια λάμπουν T’ asteria lamboun	Astir TV
Methoraikos stathmos	Μεθοριακός σταθμός	Kanistras TV
I Themis echei kefia	Η Θέμις έχει κέφια	ERT
Little Alexis (Little Alex)	Ο μικρός Αλέξης; O Mikros Alexis	Dias
Asteria st' asteria	Αστέρια στ' αστέρια Star to Star	Pissanos
O anthropakos	Ο ανθρωπάκος The Man	Pissanos
Monday's Theatre	Το θέατρο της Δευτέρας; To theatro tis Defteras	ERT
Axiotimoi kyrioi	Αξιότιμοι κύριοι	ERT
Measuring Favorites/-Favourites	Μετράω στιγμές Metrao stigmes	Mega Channel produced by Anosis
Sto para pente (On Take 5)	Στο παρά πέντε	Mega
Mermaids	-	Mega
