= Niki Linardou =

Greek actress (1939–2012)

- Νίκη Λινάρδου
- Born: Androniki Koula; June 1939
- Died: 25 September 2012 (aged 73); Athens, Greece
- Other names: Mpempi Koula
- Occupation: Actress - television producer
- Years active: 1955 - 1999
- Spouse: Alekos Sakellarios

Niki Linardou (Greek: Νίκη Λινάρδου, June 1939 – 25 September 2012), born Androniki Koula, also known as Bebi Kula or Mpempi Koula, was a Greek film and stage actress. She was the second wife of Alekos Sakellarios. After their marriage she worked as a television producer. As an actress appeared in many famous Greek films: The Fortune Teller (1956), We Have Only One Life (1958), The Policeman of the 16th Precinct (1959), A Matter of Earnestness (1965) and Kalos ilthe to dollario (1967).

== Selected filmography ==
- Laterna, ftohia kai filotimo (1955) ..... Roma girl
- The Fortune Teller (1956) ..... Marikaki
- I kyra mas i mami (1958) ..... Voula
- Astero (1959) ..... Maro
- The Policeman of the 16th Precinct (1959) ..... Maid
- Maiden's Cheek (1959) ..... Xanthopoulou
- Ta kitrina gantia (1960) ..... Anna
- Otan leipei i gata (1962) ..... Elli
- Polytehnitis kai erimospitis (1963) ..... Maria
- A Matter of Earnestness (1965) ..... Aliki Mavrogialourou
- Kalos ilthe to dollario (1967)
- The Countess of Corfu (1972) ..... Maria
