= Maiden's Cheek =

- Directed by: Alekos Sakellarios
- Starring: Aliki Vougiouklaki; Dimitris Papamichael
- Cinematography: Dinos Katsouridis
- Music by: Manos Hatzidakis
- Release date: 16 November 1959
- Running time: 1h 38min
- Country: Greece
- Language: Greek

Maiden's Cheek (Greek: Το ξύλο βγήκε από τον παράδεισο) is a 1959 Greek comedy film directed by Alekos Sakellarios, literally translated as "The beating came from paradise".

== Cast ==
- Aliki Vougiouklaki - Liza Papastavrou
- Dimitris Papamichael - Panos Floras
- Christos Tsaganeas - School Master
- Dionysis Papagiannopoulos - Makrydakis
- Orestis Makris - Gym Master Gikas
- Marika Krevata - Mrs. Papastavrou
- Melpo Zarokosta - Popi Alexiou
- Giorgos Gavriilidis - Mavromatis
- Niki Linardou - Xanthopoulou
- Katerina Gogou - Lazarou
- Anna Mantzourani - Polychronopoulou
- Thodoros Moridis - Themistocles Papastavrou
- Mary Metaxa - cook
