= I Loved an Armchair =

Agapitsa mia polythrona
- Directed by: Dinos Dimopoulos
- Written by: Lakis Mihailides
- Starring: Kostas Voutsas; Eleni Erimou; Giorgos Papazisis; Stavros Xenidis; Athinodoros Proussalis; Babis Anthopoulos; Giorgos Tzifos; Katerina Gioulaki; Giorgos Moschidis; Maria Foka; Nikitas Platis; Kostas Palios
- Music by: Giorgos Hadjinassiou
- Distributed by: Karagiannis-Karatzopoulos
- Release date: 1971
- Running time: 89 minutes
- Country: Greece
- Language: Greek

I Loved an Armchair (Greek: Αγάπησα μια πολυθρόνα, romanized: Agapisa Mia Polythrona) is a 1971 Greek film directed by Dinos Dimopoulos and produced by Karagiannis-Karatzopoulos S.A. starring Kostas Voutsas, Eleni Erimou and Giorgos Papazisis. It was written by Lakis Mihailides and was based on the 1969 Russian film Twelve Chairs, which was also made into the 1970 American film The Twelve Chairs directed by Mel Brooks. The music director in the movie was Giorgos Hadjinassiou.

== Plot ==
The film is 89 minutes long and tells the story of a poor young man who was forced to sell four chairs he had inherited from his aunt and then learned that one of them contained hidden jewelry.

== Cast ==
- Kostas Voutsas as Grigoris Karouzos
- Eleni Erimou as Kaiti
- Giorgos Papazisis as Triandafilos
- Stavros Xenidis as a psychiatrist
- Athinodoros Prousalis
- Babis Anthopoulos as a director
- Giorgos Tzifos as an assistant director
- Katerina Gioulaki as Zeta
- Giorgos Moschidis as Miltos Karnezis
- Maria Foka as aunt Vangelitsa
- Nikitas Platis as Dimitrios Nikolaou
- Kostas Palios as a judge president
- Stelios Christoforidis
- Grigoris Dekakis
- Kostas Fatouros
- Kostas Fyssoun
- Thanos Grammenos
- Ilias Kapetanidis
- Giorgos Messalas
- Panos Nikolakopoulos
- Nikos Paschalidis
- Nick Spyridonakos
- Alekos Zartaloudis
