= A Matter of Earnestness =

1965 film

- Directed by: Alekos Sakellarios
- Starring: Lambros Konstantaras; Dionysis Papagiannopoulos
- Release date: 6 December 1965
- Running time: 1h 29min
- Country: Greece
- Language: Greek

A Matter of Earnestness (Greek: Υπάρχει και φιλότιμο) is a 1965 Greek comedy film directed by Alekos Sakellarios. The film was opened in Greece on December 6, 1965.

== Cast ==
- Lambros Konstantaras - Andreas Mavrogialouros
- Dionysis Papagiannopoulos - Thodoros Grouezas
- Niki Linardou - Aliki Mavrogialourou
- Andreas Douzos - Giorgos
- Giorgos Gavriilidis - Kostas
- Melpo Zarokosta - Nanta Mavrogialourou
- Mitsi Konstadara - Lambaina
- Haris Panagiotou - Panagos
- Nikitas Platis - Fotis
- Christos Doxaras - Sotiris
- Takis Christoforidis - Efstathiou
- Giota Soimiri - Katina
- Makis Demiris - Nikolaos Lahouris

== Plot ==
Andreas Mavrogialouros is the Minister for Rural and Labour Development. He is the scion of a political dynasty centered on the village of Platania. He is honest but rather dimwitted and shortsighted, and unknowingly to him his closest advisors are corrupt and greedy. He is due to attend the inauguration of a new pregnancy clinic in his constituency.
