= Betty Moschona =

Greek actress

Betty Moschhona Μπέτυ Μοσχονά
- Born: 7 March 1927; Patras, Greece
- Died: 6 December 2006 (aged 79); Athens, Greece
- Occupation: actress

Betty Moschhona (Greek: Μπέτυ Μοσχονά; 7 March 1927 in Patras – 6 December 2006 in Athens) was a Greek actress.

She received her first role in 1952 with Mimis Kokkinis' company and participated in inspected with different comical roles (Vlachos, Kritikos, Nevrikia, Gria, Methysmeni). She employed between others including the Kalouta sisters, Orestis Makris, Sofia Vebo, Rena Dor, Al. Livaditis, Kouli Stoligka and the husband of Takis Miliadis. In 1966 and 1967, she became the company head of Rena Vlachopoulou and Vasilis Avlonitis in a repertoire always with the company in the comedy community. In 1968 and 1969, she had an artistic member of the company Asoi tou geliou at the Vebo Theatre.

After 1970, Moschona acted with Lambros Konstantaras, Kostas Karras, Mary Chronopoulou, Nikos Rizos, Rena Vlachopoulou, Aliki Vougiouklaki (in Efthymi chira). For some years, she remained at Kostas Voutsas's company. The swan song ballad at the theater from 1998 until 1999 in the Hal Salguin comedy at the Apothiki Theater (Theatre).

She also played in films including Peripterou as well as television including Epta kaka tis moiras mou with Giorgos Konstantinou, in Axiotimos kyrious and in Madame Soussou.

She was awarded with the theatrical Ta Panathinaia for her roles at the theatre.

== Filmography ==
=== Film ===
Year	Film	Transliteration and translation	Role
1955	Katadikasmeni kai apo to paidi tis	Καταδικασμένη και από το παιδί της	-
1956	The Fortune Teller	Η καφετζού	client
1958	Melpo	Μέλπω	-
1962	Ta kothonia tou thraniou	Τα κωθώνια του θρανίου	Reveka
1962	I elpida kai o erotas	Η ελπίδα και ο έρωτας	Aleka
1962	I kyria tou kyriou	Η κυρία του κυρίου	-
1963	Polytehnitis kai erimospitis	Πολυτεχνίτης και ερημοσπίτης	Rena
1963	Young and Old in Action	Μικροί και μεγάλοι εν δράση Mikri ke megali en drassi	Ioulia
1964	O paras kai o foukaras	Ο παράς και ο φουκαράς	Italian cabaret singer
1964	Someone for a Millionaire	Άλλος για το εκατομύριο Allos gia ton ekatommyrio	Mrs. Loukidou
1965	Make Me a Prime Minister	Κάνε με πρωθυπουργό Kane me prothopourgo	-
1965	Kai o 14 itan yperochoi	Και οι 14 ήταν υπέροχοι	-
1965	I de gyni na fovitai ton andra	Η δε γυνή να φοβήται τον άνδρα	widow
1966	Oute milaei oute lalaei	Ούτε μιλάει ούτε λαλάει	Kakia
1966	O Melegis stin ameso drasi	Ο Μελέτης στην άμεσο δράση	-
1966	Louiza	Λουίζα	-
1970	Kounia pou se kounage	Κούνια που σε κούναγε	Filio
1970	I peripterou	Η περιπτερού	Fofo
1970	One-One-Four	Ένα -ένα-τέσσερα Ena-ena-tessera	-
1990	Prosochi mas valane	Προσοχή μας βάλανε	-

=== Television ===
Year	Film	Transliteration and translation
1987	I alepou kai o boufos	Η αλεπού και ο μπούφος
1991	Ta epta kaka tis moiras mou	Τα επτά κακά της μοίρας μου
-	Madame Soussou	Μαντάμ Σουσού
-	Axiotimi kyrii	Αξιότιμοι κύριοι

=== Theater ===
Year	Film	Transliteration and translation	Writer	Genre
1952	Three Modern Girls	Τρία μοντέρνα κορίτσια	-	-
1962-63	The Emperor's Violet	Αυτοκρατορικές βιολέτες	V. Skotos	operetta
1964	Dolce vita	-	Giannakopoulos; Nikolaidis	-
1968	Allos gia to Kastri	Άλλος για το Καστρί; Another for Kastri	-	-
1968	Bossa Nova	-	-	-
1969	Gargalata, gargalata	Γαργάλατα, γαργάλατα	-	-
1969	Opoion thelei o laos	Όποιον θέλει ο λαός	-	-
1983	I efthymi chira	Η εύθυμη χήρα	-	-
1997-99	Anameinate sto akoustiko sas	Αναμείνατε στο ακουστικό σας	-	-
1999	Anameinate sto akoustiko sas	Αναμείνατε στο ακουστικό σας	Hal Salguin	comedy
