= Alekos =

Alekos (Greek: Αλέκος) is a masculine given name, a diminutive of Alexander. Notable people with the name include:

- Alekos Alavanos (born 1950), Greek politician, member of the Hellenic Parliament
- Alekos Alekou (born 1983), Cypriot football striker who played for Aris Limassol
- Alekos Alexandrakis (1928–2005), Greek actor
- Alekos Alexiadis (1945–2025), Greek footballer
- Alekos Fassianos (1935–2022), Greek painter
- Alekos Flambouraris (1938–2025), Greek politician
- Alekos Karavitis (1904–1975), Cretan lyra player
- Alekos Livaditis (1914–1980), Greek actor
- Alekos Michaelides (1933–2008), Cypriot politician
- Alexandros Panagoulis (1939–1976), Greek politician and poet, known as Alekos
- Alekos Petroulas (born 1978), Greek basketball player
- Alekos Rantos (born 1966), Greek footballer and coach
- Alekos Sakellarios (1913–1991), Greek writer and a director
- Alekos Sofianidis (born 1933), Turkish-Greek football player and manager
- Alekos Zartaloudis (1929–2007), Greek actor

== See also ==
- Aleko (given name)
