= Andreas Douzos =

Greek actor and director (1934–2013)

- Ανδρέας Ντούζος
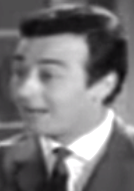
- Born: 17 April 1934; Athens, Greece
- Died: 29 April 2013 (aged 79); Athens, Greece
- Resting place: Athens 2nd Cemetery
- Citizenship: Greece; United States (1967–1980)
- Education: Actors Studio
- Occupations: Actor; director; theatrical producer; theatre entrepreneur; dancer
- Years active: 1953–2001
- Employer: Finos Film
- Spouse: Anastasia Douzou
- Children: 2

Andreas Douzos (Greek: Ανδρέας Ντούζος; 17 April 1934 – 29 April 2013) was a Greek actor, director, theatrical producer and theatre entrepreneur. He is regarded as one of the most well-known figures in Greek cinema of the 1960s.

== Early life ==
Andreas Douzos was born on 17 April 1934, in Athens. He began appearing in films in 1953 with The Damned (1953), and from then on he appeared in more than thirty films until 2001. In the theatrical season 1955/1956 he participated, portrayed Nikolios, in the drama play The Christ Recrucified held at Alsos theatre.

== Career ==
A 1955 made-for-theatre adaption of the 1954 novel of the same name written by Nikos Kazantzakis, directed by Takis Mouzenidis with cast of the theatre troupe of Manos Katrakis' People's Theatre. When the protagonist actor Manos Katrakis, who portrayed Manolios, was taken ill and cannot play, then Andreas Douzos has proposed whether it would be possible to play this role because he knew it before. Thereafter, he was chosen to act the role gained further recognition and critical acclaim.

In an appearance broadcast on ERT TV channel's Kalitechniko Kafenio program in 1985 with presenters Vasilis Tsivilikas, Costas Ferris, Mimis Plessas, Andreas Douzos revealed "I denied to offer myself to anyone for exchange activities in regards to career benefits", a declaration of being one of his principles.

He studied acting from 1952 to 1955 at the Takis Mouzenidis Institute of Musical Theatre (Greek: Σπουδαστήριο του Μουσικού Θεάτρου) and was under the tutelage of renowned acting teacher Takis Mouzenidis. By the time he was still an acting student at age 19, he married Anastasia Douzos (1937–2016) with whom he had one son and a daughter, Steve (born 1959) and Teta (born 1964) both of whom later were played in roles in Greek low-budget B-movies during the 1980s. He had two granddaughters from his daughter, and one granddaughter and one grandson from his son. When he was about 31-year-old, he relocated from Greece to New York City, United States, residing from 1967 to 1980 in the borough of The Bronx, during which time he studied directing at the Actors Studio Drama School, and he also attended professional choreography courses at the Martha Graham Center of Contemporary Dance lasted five years.

Subsequently he returned to Greece, where he relocated permanently in Athens, he became theatrical entrepreneur founded his own theatrical company in 1982 the Theatrical Businesses Andreas Ntouzos undertook the Superstar Theatre (later renamed Broadway Theatre; today known as the Theatro Katia Dandoulaki) 1000m^{2} in the Athens district of Kypseli. In 1990/1991 theatrical season, starred in the Jean de Létraz play Chasing love (Chasse gardée; Greek: Κυνηγώντας τον έρωτα) staged at the Superstar Theatre which he himself directed.

In 1994, in order to withdraw his business shares due to financial difficulties, he sold the business of theatre to actress Katia Dandoulaki. His last film role appearance was in the film Athens Blues (2001; Greek original title it can be literally translated as A Day Night) directed by Giorgos Panousopoulos.

== Later life and death ==
He was hospitalized in a private hospital in Athens on 19 July 2010, after experiencing chest pain and intense discomfort, however, tests did not show anything serious. He was rushed to the intensive care unit of a private clinic in Athens on 24 January 2013 with a hematoma on his head, after a fall at his home, and underwent surgery. He died after months of hospitalization on 29 April 2013, at age 79. For the last seven years of his life, he suffered from Alzheimer's disease. He was buried on 2 May at the Athens 2nd Cemetery.

== Feature films ==
Year	Title	Role
1953	The Damned	Andreas Galanis
1954	The Girl of the Neighbourhood	As a dancer
1954	Magic City	Argyris
1956	The Orge	
1957	Uncle Giannis, the Potter	Stefanos
1960	Take Me Away, My Love	
1961	Forty Brave Lads	Vasilis
1961	Kick the Thieves Out!	Andreas Adamandas
1961	Woe to the Young	Manolis
1962	Wallow in the Mud	Tonis
1962	Shoe shiner	Takis
1962	When the Cat is Away	Angelos Floras
1963	What Night Hides	Alekos
1963	The Prodigal Son	George Dompros
1963	Wounded Ηearts	Panos Koukoulis
1963	Anything, My Life Itself	
1963	Midnight at Villa Nelli	
1964	My Bitter Love	Alkis
1964	Forget Poverty and Live it Up!	Kostas Lyridis
1964	The World and all its People	Angelos
1964	The Villa of Orgies	Alekos
1965	The Robber Cries Thief	Antonis Papadopoulos
1965	The Story of a Life	Lakis Papadopoulos
1965	A Matter of Earnestness	Giorgos
1965	The Enemies	Dimitris
1965	Kiss the Girls	Andreas Ramoglou
1966	Rendez-vous in the Air	Dimitris Nikolaou
1966	Rough Seas	Avgoustis
1966	I Am Not Dishonored	Aris
1967	Rot and Aristocracy	Dimitris Kalakos
1967	The Big Fool	Himself
1967	If My Past Could Speak	Christos
1967	The Train of Separation	Stathis
1983	Priestly Band	
1984	Girl Zoo	Apostolopoulos
1985	Tall, Thin and a Big Liar	Captain
1986	The Girl of the Poster	Aris Vrettos
1987	A Night at the Ethics Station	Hercules Trampas
2001	Athens Blues	Thanos

== Selected theatrical plays ==
Theatrical season	Theatre Play	Role (character)	Theatre Vevue	Director	Theatrical Company
1952/1953	The Unfortunate-man and Lucky-girl		Cybele Theatre		Troupe of Ellie Lambeti, George Pappas, and Dimitris Horn
1955/1956	The Christ Recrucified	Nikolios	Alsos Theatre	Takis Mouzenidis	Troupe of Manos Katrakis' People's Theatre
1958/1959	The Engagements		Nikos Chatziskos Οutdoor Τheatre	Nikos Chatziskos	Troupe of Nikos Chatziskos
1958/1959	The Local Factor		Piraeus Municipal Theatre	Dimitris Rontiris	Piraeus Theatre
Summer 1962	Beautiful City		Park Theatre	Michael Cacoyannis	
1963/1964	A Man for All Seasons	Richard Rich	Mousouri Theatre	Kostas Mousouris	Troupe o Kostas Mousouris
1966/1967	The Lamb of the Poor	General Bonaparte	Kotopouli Theatre	Kostis Michailidis	Troupe of Aliki Vougiouklaki and Dimitris Papamichael
1980/1981	They're Playing Our Song	Vernon Gersch	Kalouta Theatre	Errikos Andreou	Artistic Organization "Modern Theatre"
1990/1991	Chasing Love	Kostas Petrou	Souperstar Theatre	Andreas Ntouzos	Theatrical Businesses Andreas Ntouzos
