= Dimitris Nikolaidis =

Greek actor (1922–1993)

Dimitris Nikolaidis Δημήτρης Νικολαΐδης
- Born: 1922; Asia Minor (now Turkey)
- Died: January 1993 (aged 70–71); Athens, Greece
- Occupation: Actor

Dimitris Nikolaidis (Greek: Δημήτρης Νικολαΐδης; 1922 – 21 January 1993) was a Greek actor.

== Career ==
Nikolaidis was born in 1922 in Asia Minor and died in January 1993. His journey of life began on a ship that headed from Constantinople (now Istanbul) to Piraeus, between them two youngsters, Eftalia and Nikos. His family moved to Greece to escape the Turkish raids. During his transfer trip, his father got sick.

The family settled in Athens as the father's sickness did not retreat (the problem was mainly genetic as from the father's organism that shook an enzyme, it cleaned the blood without knowing that revived the body). He died soon after at Sotiria hospital from galloping pneumonia. Nine days earlier Dimitris was born.

From his young age he loved sports even track and field. He was a good student which he was one of the 30 children that passed with scholarship from the Experimental School in Kolonaki which was the greatest school in Athens on Skoufas Street.

During the enemy occupation he had work and power in resistance. In 1942 Khun ( or Coon) ran the Art Theatre with a company that used students that included himself. It had a debut in 1944 with his student Alekos Solomos O Teleftaios Asprokorakas

He participated in Mrs Katerina's company in 1945 in which he stayed until 1949; he later went on with Vasilis Logothetidis with a play by Alekos Sakellarios. For four years, he played with other companies and in 1954 returned again to act with Logothetidis for three years in films not only with as Logothetidis' character.

He met his wife Souli Sabah, a friend of Ilia Livykou, in Athens after the trip that Souli made in Egypt which she stayed (a year before she welcomed to the company) and a month later, recognized on 15 September 1955.

In film, he made his first movie The Girl From the Neighbourhood in 1954 with Smaroula Giouli, Giorgos Fountas, Orestis Makris, etc. He also played in international roles including America, America by Elia Kazan. He played in 80 movies.

In the summer of 1965, he played and directed his first theatrical play at the Minoa Theatre Mia Pentaras Niata (Μια Πεντάρας Νιάτα) by Pretenteris-Gialamas which was successful. That was his beginning. Without directing, he appeared several times as an actor in theatrical play Oute gata oute zimia (No Cats, Not Even a Damage) by Alekos Sakellarios-Giannakopoulos Agapi mou Paliogria (Αγάπη Μου Παλιόγρια) with Paul Vassiliadis - Lakis Michailidis, etc.

His last role on stage was in 1980 in I erotiarides by Vasos Andrianos.

He worked with several stars including Elli Lambeti, Tzeni Karezi, Lambros Konstantaras, Costas Voutsas, etc.

On the small screen, from his great success are Ekeines kai Ego with Lambros Konstantaras. He still liked his friend and fellow actor and theatrical writer Kostas Pretenteris. Together appeared in O Thyroros which he played a Bulldozer.

In films, he directed only one movie, a comedy, called I gynaika mou trellathike with Mairi Aroni and Lambros Konstantaras.

His wife was Souli Sabah (or Sambach) (born 1931 in Cairo), an actress and director. They directed on YENED with a serial Ekeines ki ego with Lambros Konstantaras.

== Filmography ==
Year	Film	Transliteration and translation	Role
1954	The Girl From the Neighbourhood	Το κορίτσι της γειτονιάς To koritsi tis geitonias	Didis
1959	Pos pernoun i pandremeni	Πώς περνούν οι παντρεμένοι	Sotos
1959	Na petheros na malama	Να πεθερός να μάλαμα	Menelaos
1960	Nights in Miramare	Νύχτες στο Μιραμάρε; Nychtes sto Miramare	director
1960	Egklima sta paraskinia	Έγκλημα στα παρασκήνια	-
1961	Ziteitai pseftis	Ζητείται ψεύτης	Panagis Dervissis
1961	Poia einai i Margarita	Ποια είναι η Μαργαρίτα; Who is Margarita	Georges
1961	O palikaras	Ο παλικαράς	Detective X
1961	The Smart Bird	Το έξυπνο πουλί To exipno pouli	Filotas
1961	Exo oi kleftes	Έξω οι κλέφτες Get the Thieves Out	Mr. Petsomenos
1961	Eftyhos trelathika	Ευτυχώς τρελάθηκα	a psychiatrist
1962	Zito i trela	Ζήτω η τρέλα	Leon Karfis
1963	Polytehnitis kai erimospitis	Πολυτεχνίτης κι ερημοσπίτης	Theodoros
1963	Chtypokardia sto thranio	Χτυποκάρδια στο θρανίο	a professor
1963	O Giannis ta 'kane thalassa	Ο Γιάννης τα 'κανε θάλασσα	a doctor
1964	I Will Make You Queen	Θα σε κάνω βασίλισσα Tha se kano vasilissa	Nikos
1964	Prodossia	Προδοσία	-
1964	Despoinis diefthyntis	Δεσποινίς διευθυντής	Captain Gelebourdezos
1965	Gie mou gie mou	Υιέ μου υιέ μου	-
1966	Ispraktor 007	Εισπράκτωρ 007	Telis
1967	Otan ta psaria vgikan sti steria	Όταν τα ψάρια βγήκαν στη στεριά	a dentist
1968	Kapetan fantis bastouni	Καπετάν φάντης μπαστούνι	Zissis
1968	O tzanabettis	Ο τζαναμπέτης	Savvas (Vavvas) Fotinos
1969	O paramythas	Ο παραμυθάς	a psychiatrist
1970	O pehnidiaris	Ο παιχνιδιάρης	Member Bastounas
1971	Efoplistis me to zori	Εφοπλιστής με το ζόρι	Manolis Karnezis
1972	I Rena einai offsaint	Η Ρένα είναι οφσάιντ Rena is Offside	Antonis
1973	A Taste of Greece	Γεύση από Ελλάδα; Gefsi apo Ellada	-
