= When the Cat Is Away =

- Greek: Όταν λείπει η γάτα
- Directed by: Alekos Sakellarios
- Written by: Alekos Sakellarios
- Produced by: G. Lazaridis; D. Sarris; Kostas Psarras
- Starring: Vasilis Avlonitis; Rena Vlachopoulou; Niki Linardou; Nikos Rizos; Floreta Zana; Stavros Paravas; Giannis Vogiatzis; Andreas Douzos; Marika Krevata; Giorgos Gavriilidis; Giorgos Xydis; Broyer Brothers (in their first appearance)
- Music by: Giorgos Mouzakis
- Distributed by: Roussopouloi Brothers
- Release date: 1962
- Running time: 93 mins
- Country: Greece
- Language: Greek

When the Cat Is Away (Greek: Όταν λείπει η γάτα) is a 1962 Greek comedy film made by Finos Films. It was directed by Alekos Sakellarios and stars Vasilis Avlonitis, Rena Vlachopoulou and Niki Linardou.

== Plot ==
An upper-class Athenian family, the Zemberis, are going on a short weekend cruise on a friend's yacht. Marigo, Loukas, and Elli, their cook, driver, and maid, are planning to take advantage of their absence, "borrow" some clothes and the car, and go on an expensive night out on the town. They decide on a night club where a young popular singer, Telis Stefanis, sings every night. Telis however has been invited to the same cruise as the Zemberis family and his friend Angelos, a rich playboy smitten with Elli, tries to impress her by pretending he's Telis. Elli falls for him but lets him believe she's Anna, the daughter of the Zemberis family. At the same time, the real Anna and the real Telis fall in love at the cruise.

Everything goes wrong the next day when Elli calls the real Telis thinking he's the one she met the night before and tells him she's just Anna's maid. Meanwhile, Angelos gets in touch with the real Anna, believing she's the girl he was dancing with and tells her he's not really Telis. The truth comes out and Marigo, Loukas, and Elli get fired on the spot. Angelos manages to track down Elli, declares his love, and the movie ends with a happy ending.

== Cast ==
- Niki Linardou ..... Elli
- Rena Vlahopoulou ..... Marigo
- Vasilis Avlonitis ..... Loukas
- Andreas Douzos ..... Angelos Floras
- Giannis Vogiatzis ..... Telis Stefanis
- Floreta Zana ..... Anna Zemberi
- Marika Krevata ..... Mrs. Zemberi
- Giorgos Gavriilidis ..... Mr. Zemberis
- Nikos Rizos ..... Babis
- Stavros Paravas ..... band member
- Giorgos Xydis ..... club doorman

== Info ==
- Montage: Gerasimos Papadaros
- Stylist: Petros Kapouralis
- Make-up: Varvara Nikolettou
- Photographer Member: Lefteris Vlachos
- Tickets: 31,133
