= We Have Only One Life =

1958 film by George Tzavellas

- Directed by: George Tzavellas
- Starring: Yvonne Sanson; Dimitris Horn
- Cinematography: Dinos Katsouridis
- Edited by: Dinos Katsouridis
- Music by: Manos Hatzidakis
- Release date: 14 September 1958
- Running time: 1h 51min
- Country: Greece
- Language: Greek

We Have Only One Life (Greek: Μια ζωή την έχουμε) is a 1958 Greek comedy film directed by George Tzavellas.

== Cast ==
- Yvonne Sanson - Bibi Koumoundouropoulou
- Dimitris Horn - Kleon
- Vasilis Avlonitis - Haralabos Bazoukas
- Christos Tsaganeas - bank manager
- Periklis Christoforidis - Manolis
- Lavrentis Dianellos - barba-Fotis
- Koulis Stoligkas - dancing competition judge
- Dionysis Papagiannopoulos - Mr. Daouglou
- Giorgos Damasiotis - Mihalis
- Stavros Iatridis - Paparakis
- Giannis Ioannidis - supervisor
- Thanos Tzeneralis - bank client
- Rallis Angelidis - lawyer
- Charis Kamilli - Kitsa
- Panagiotis Karavousanos - neighbour
- Nikos Fermas - night watcher
- Eberhard Winchenbach - Hengelmann
- Joly Garbi
- Niki Linardou - jewellery store seller
- Kostas Gousgounis - coffee shop owner
