= Polytehnitis kai erimospitis =

1963 comedy film by Alekos Sakellarios

- Directed by: Alekos Sakellarios
- Starring: Thanasis Veggos; Marika Krevata
- Release date: 1963
- Running time: 1h 20min
- Country: Greece
- Language: Greek

Polytehnitis kai erimospitis (Greek: Πολυτεχνίτης και ερημοσπίτης (English: Jack of all trades and master of one) is a 1963 Greek comedy film directed by Alekos Sakellarios.

== Cast ==
- Thanasis Veggos - Thanasis Birbilis
- Marika Krevata - Maria's mother
- Giorgos Gavriilidis - father posing for a picture
- Niki Linardou - Maria
- Giannis Vogiatzis - restaurant customer
- Betty Moshona - Rena
- Dimitris Nikolaidis - Thodoros Bakatsoularas
- Katerina Yioulaki - Johnny's mother
- Gizela Dali - La bella Lucia
- Athinodoros Prousalis - Panagos
- Giorgos Tzifos - restaurant owner
