= Xenidis =

Xenidis is a surname. Notable people with the surname include:

- Georgios Xenidis (1974–2019), Greek footballer
- Stavros Xenidis (1924–2008), Greek actor
- Theofilos Xenidis (born 1966), Canadian musician
