= Souli Sabah =

Greek actress (1932–2023)

- Σούλη Σαμπάχ
- Born: 16 February 1932; Alexandria, Egypt
- Died: 2 May 2023 (aged 91); Athens, Greece
- Spouse: Dimitris Nikolaidis (1955–1993)

Anastasia Christodoulou (Greek: Αναστασία Χριστοδούλου; 16 February 1932 – 2 May 2023), known professionally as Souli Sabah (Greek: Σούλη Σαμπάχ), was a Greek actress and singer.

== Biography ==
Sabah was born on 16 February 1932 in Alexandria, Egypt. Her father came from Polemi and her mother from Chios. In the 1950s, the family came to Athens and Sabah started singing at the secular center "Gaki". She made her first film appearance in the film Laterna, poverty and honor, together with Tzeni Karezi, Vasilis Avlonitis and Mimis Fotopoulos. She also performed on television and in the theater in major productions and reviews.

Sabah was also the wife of actor Dimitris Nikolaidis, while living in Athens. She died on 2 May 2023, at the age of 91.
