= The Fortune Teller (1956 film) =

- Directed by: Alekos Sakellarios
- Produced by: Finos Film
- Starring: Georgia Vasileiadou; Mimis Fotopoulos
- Music by: Manos Hatzidakis
- Release date: 20 October 1956
- Running time: 1h 29min
- Country: Greece
- Language: Greek

The Fortune Teller (Greek: Η καφετζού) is a 1956 Greek comedy film directed by Alekos Sakellarios.

== Cast ==
- Georgia Vasileiadou - Kalliopi
- Mimis Fotopoulos - Spyros Tsardis
- Vasilis Avlonitis - Nikitas
- Smaroula Giouli - Kaiti Giavasi
- Eleni Zafeiriou - Anna Giavasi
- Periklis Christoforidis - Andreas Giavasis/Velliris
- Giorgos Damasiotis - drunkard
- Betty Moschona - rich lady 1
- Kostas Papachristos - police captain
- Nikos Fermas - pistaccio salesman
- Kostas Mentis - laundry customer
- Beata Asimakopoulou - rich lady 2
