= The Song of Pain =

1953 film by Dimis Dadiras

- Directed by: Dimis Dadiras
- Written by: Manthos Ketsis (play)
- Cinematography: Antonis Karatzopoulos
- Music by: Nikos Hatzeas
- Production company: Nikols Film
- Release date: September 30, 1953
- Running time: 80 minutes
- Country: Greece
- Language: Greek

The Song of Pain (Greek: To tragoudi tou ponou) is a 1953 Greek romantic drama film directed by Dimis Dadiras and starring Inta Hristinaki, Malvina Kalvou and Stavros Xenidis.

== Cast ==
- Inta Hristinaki as Lia
- Malvina Kalvou as Eva
- Stavros Xenidis
- Julia Bouka
- Elias Stamatiou
- Michalis Nikolopoulos as Alekos
- Dimitris Dounakis
- Andreas Georgiou
- Julianna Stamiri
- Rania Tsenebi
- Vera Vasdeki

== Bibliography ==
- Aglaïa Mētropoulou & Maria Komnēnou. Hellēnikos kinēmatographos. Ekdoseis Papazēsē, 2006.
