= Aleko (disambiguation) =

Aleko is the trade name of a Russian mid-size car sold between 1986 and 1997.

Aleko may also refer to:

== Arts and entertainment ==
- Aleko, a main character in the poem "The Gypsies" by Alexander Pushkin
- Aleko (Rachmaninoff), Sergei Rachmaninoff's first completed opera, adapted from the poem
- Aleko (film), a 1953 Soviet musical film based on the opera
- Aleko, a 1942 ballet by Léonide Massine based on the poem

== People ==
- Aleko (given name), a list of men with the name

== Places ==
- Aleko, Vitosha, Bulgaria, a tourist and winter sports centre
- Aleko Hydro Power Plant, Bulgaria
- Aleko Point, Antarctica
