= The Policeman of the 16th Precinct =

- Directed by: Alekos Sakellarios
- Starring: Kostas Hatzichristos; Marika Krevata
- Release date: 6 April 1959
- Running time: 1h 28min
- Country: Greece
- Language: Greek

The Policeman of the 16th Precinct (Greek: Ο Ηλίας του 16ου) is a 1959 Greek comedy film directed by Alekos Sakellarios.

== Cast ==
- Kostas Hatzichristos - Ilias
- Marika Krevata - Loukia
- Dionysis Papagiannopoulos - Labros
- Kyveli Theohari - Aleka Konstadinidi
- Giorgos Gavriilidis - Orestis Konstadinidis
- Aliki Georgouli - Tasia Berberi
- Stavros Xenidis - Vangelis
- Lavrentis Dianellos - Mastrolavrentis
- Alekos Tzanetakos - Spanomarias
- Thanasis Tzeneralis - police officer
- Kostas Papachristos - police sergeant
- Thanasis Veggos - Thomas
- Panagiotis Karavousanos - Panagos Berberis
- Zoi Fytousi - Mrs. Logotheti
- Lavrentis Dianellos - Lavrentis
- Niki Linardou - Elli
- Dimitra Seremeti-Papachristou - neighbour

== Reception ==
Hal Erickson of AllRovi finds that the film is an excellent cure for insomnia for a non-Greek audience.
