= Alekos Zartaloudis =

Greek actor

Alekos Zartaloudis Αλέκος Ζαρταλούδης
- Born: 1929
- Died: February 7, 2007; Greece
- Occupation: actor

Alexandros (Alekos) Zartaloudis (Greek: Αλέκος Ζαρταλούδης; 1929 – February 7, 2007) was a Greek actor. He studied at drama school with Kostas Mihailidis and he worked in theater alongside Aliki Vougiouklaki and Dimitris Papamichail. He later moved to the US. He took part in many movies along with TV shows.

== Filmography ==
=== As cinematographer ===
| Year | Film title (English translation) | Original title and transliteration | Role |
|---|---|---|---|
| 1965 | Face of the Day | Το Πρόσωπο της Ημέρας; To prossopo tis imeras | - |
| 1966 | I kori mou i sosialistria | Η Κόρη μου η Σοσιαλίστρια | a tavern |
| 1967 | To pio lambro asteri | Το Πιο Λαμπρό Αστέρι; The Shiniest Star | a bell ringer |
| 1967 | Dimitri mou, Dimitri mou | Δημήτρη μου... Δημήτρη μου My Dimitri, My Dimitri | a worker |
| 1968 | Our Love | Η Αγάπη μας I agapi mas | - |
| 1968 | O Gigas tis Kypselis | Ο Γίγας της Κυψέλης | - |
| 1968 | Kapetan fandis bastouni | Καπετάν φάντης μπαστούνη | Grigoris, a chef |
| 1968 | Gia tin timi kai ton erota | Για την Τιμή και τον Έρωτα | - |
| 1968 | O anthropos pou gyrise apo ta piata | Ο Άνθρωπος που Γύρισε από τα Πιάτα | - |
| 1969 | Fovatai o Giannis to therio | Φοβάται ο Γιάννης το θεριό' Yiannis is Scared of Winter | - |
| 1969 | O Gennaioi tou Vorra | Οι γεννέοι του Βορρά | - |
| 1970 | I taxitzou | ταξιτζού | an injured person |
| 1970 | O Tanalis, i Ioulieta kai ta loukanika | Ο Θανάλης, η Ιουλιέτα και τα λουκάνικα | Tryfonas |
| 1970 | Krima to boy sou | Κρίμα το μπόι σου | - |
| 1970 | Gyro mas gkremistikan ola | Γύρω μας γκρεμίστηκαν όλα | - |
| 1971 | O Agathiaris kai i Atsida | Ο Αγαθιάρης και η Ατσίδα | - |
| 1971 | O aittitos | Ο Αήττητος | - |
| 1971 | Agapissa mia polithrona | Αγάπησα μια πολυθρόνα | - |
| 1971 | I efoplistina | Η εφοπλιστίνα | an authentic cabaret |
| 1971 | Ena agori alliotiko ap' t' alla | Ένα αγόρι αλλοιώτικο απ' τ' άλλα | a driver |
| 1972 | Ap t alonia, sta salonia | Aπ' τ' αλώνια, στα σαλόνια | - |
| 1972 | O anthropos pou espage Plaka | Άνθρωπος Που έσπαγε Πλάκα | - |
| 1972 | Anazitissis.. | Αναζήτησις.. Answers.. | - |
| 1972 | O kyrios stathmarchis | Ο κύριος σταθμάρχης The Chief Manager | - |
| 1972 | I Rena einai ofsaint | Η Ρένα είναι οφσάιντ Rena is Offside | - |
| 1972 | I Aliki diktator | Η Αλίκη Δικτάτωρ | - |
| 1979 | I fandarines | Οι φανταρίνες | - |
| 1979 | O palavos kosmos tou Thanassi | Ο παλαβός κόσμος του Θανάση | - |
| 1981 | Gkarsoniera gia Deka | Γκαρσονιέρα για Δέκα | - |
| 1981 | Enas kondos ma mas sossi | Ένας κοντός θα μας σώσει | - |
| 1982 | To ema ton agalmaton | Το αίμα των αγαλμάτων | - |
| 1982 | O Thanassis kai to katarameno fidi | Ο Θανάσης και το καταραμένο φιδι | Vladimiros |
| 1982 | O aftakias | *Ο Αυτάκιας | - |
| 1982 | Ta Sainia | Τα Σαΐνια | - |
| 1982 | Itan axios | Ήταν άξιος | a barber |
| 1983 | Gyftiki kobania | Γύφτικη κομπανία The Gypsy's Enterprise? | - |
| 1983 | Roda, tsanda kai kopana No. 2 | Ρόδα, τσάντα και κοπάνα No 2 | - |
| 1983 | O anthropos pou to paize poly | Ο Άνθρωπος Που το' Παιζε Πολύ | - |
| 1984 | Lalkis o eisagomenos | Λαλάκης, o εισαγόμενος | - |
| 1984 | Eis mnimin Harry Klynn | Εις μνήμην Χάρη Κλυν | a chef |
| 1984 | An itan to violi pouli... | Aν ήταν το βιολί πουλί... | - |
| 1985 | Rakos No 14 | Ράκος Νο 14 | - |
| 1985 | Peraste tin proti to minos | Περάστε την πρώτη του μηνός | - |
| 1985 | Boroume kai kato ap' ta thrania | Μπορούμε και κάτω απ' τα θρανία | Vasileiadis |
| 1985 | Agoria stin porneia | Αγορια Στην Πορνεια | - |
| 1985 | A Cobra from Yiannena (video) | Η Κόμπρα από Τα Γιάννενα; I kobra apo ta Yiannena | - |
| 1986 | The Gypsy Dynasty (video) | Γύφτικη Δυναστεία; Yiftiki Dinastia | - |
| 1986 | O Giannis pou egine Johnny | Ο Γιάννης που έγινε Τζώνης; Yianni became Johnny' | Solonas |
| 1986 | Kleftroni kai Gentleman | Κλεφτρόνι και Τζέντλεμαν | - |
| 1987 | O gyftoaristokratis | Ο γυφτοαριστοκράτης The Gypsy Aristocrat | a minister |
| 1987 | The Lazy Doctor | Ο τρελογιατρός O trelogiatros | - |
| 1987 | I trela paei sta.. scholeia | Η Τρέλα Πάει στα... Σχολεία; Bums Goes to... School | - |
| 1987 | Made in Greece | - | - |
| 1987 | O archontas tis Ligouras (video) | Ο Άρχοντας της Λιγούρας | - |
| 1987 | Epangelma yineka | Επάγγελμα γυναίκα | - |
| 1988 | Kai dilos ke tolmiros | Και δειλός και τολμηρός | - |
| 1988 | Akatamahits pilotos (video) | Ακαταμάχητος πιλότος | - |
| 1988 | Apagogi sta tyfla | Απαγωγή στα τυφλά | - |
| 1988 | Mia treli treli nychta (video) | Μια τρελή τρελή νύχτα A Lazy Lazy Night | - |
| 1988 | Arpaxe na fas ke klepse na his (video) | Άρπαξε να φας και κλέψε να'χεις | - |
| 1989 | O paraharaktis (video) | Ο Παραχαράκτης | - |
| 1989 | A Star in Our Neighbourhood | Μια σταρ στην γειτονιά μας Mia star stin geitonia mas | Faronis |
| 1989 | O teleftaios peirasmos tou Mitsou (video) | Ο τελευταίος πειρασμός του Μήτσου | - |
| 1990 | I altissa | Η αλήτισσα | - |

=== Television ===
| Year | Title (English translation) | Original title and transliteration | Role |
|---|---|---|---|
| 1996 | Ekeines kai ego | Εκείνες κι εγώ | Thodoros |
| - | Tmima ithon | Τμήμα ηθών | - |
