= Thodoros Kefalopoulos =

Greek actor (1894–1987)

Thodoros Kefalopoulos Θόδωρος Κεφαλόπουλος
- Born: 1894; Vryoula, Smyrna, Greek Wilayet, Ottoman Empire
- Died: 1987 (aged 92–93); Athens, Greece
- Occupation: Actor

Thodoros Kefalopoulos (Greek: Θόδωρος Κεφαλόπουλος; 1894–1987) was a Greek actor.

== Early life ==
He was born in Vryoula near Smyrna (modern İzmir) in the Ottoman Empire in 1894.

== Career ==
His first screen appearance was in 1915. Hebecame a member of the Hellenic Actor's Guild a few months after its foundation in 1917. He participated chiefly in roving theatrical troupes, playing all kinds of roles (drama, comedy, burlesque, etc.). He founded a number of troupes himself, touring tall of Greece along with his wife, Sofia Kefalopoulou (1984-19??). Near the end of his career, in the 1960s, he also landed minor roles in a number of movies. He was also a member of the management board of the Actors' Mutual Assistance Fund. He died in 1987 in Athens.

== Filmography ==
Year	Film title (English translation)	Original title and transliteration	
1955	laterna ftocheia kai filotimo	Λατέρνα φτώχεια και φιλότιμο	-
1956	Kyriakatikoi iroes	Κυριακάτικοι ήρωες	a doctor of the national team
1960	I 900 tis Marinas	Οι 900 της Μαρίνας	Stathis
1962	I aetonychides/ Mi varate oli mazi	Οι αετονύχηδες / Μη βαράτε όλοι μαζί	-
1962	Dimos From Trikala	Ο Δήμος από τα Τρίκαλα; O Dimos apo ta Trikala	-
1962	Smart and Liars	Έξυπνοι και κορόιδα Exypnoi kai koroida	-
1963	O adelfos Anna	Ο αδελφός Άννα	-
1963	Red Lights	Κόκκινα φανάρια Kokkina fanaria	Eleni's customer
1964	I prikothires	Οι προικοθήρες	-
1964	O Yiannis takane thalasa	Ο Γιάννης τάκανε θάλασσα	-
1964	Lola	Λόλα	-
1964	I Soferina	Η σωφερίνα	-
1965	Fonazei o kleftis	Φωνάζει ο κλέφτης The Robber is Yelling	Anastassis
1965	Tzeni Tzeni	Τζένη Τζένη	-
1965	I gyni na fovitai ton andra	Η γυνή να φοβήται τον άνδρα	-
1967	O spangoramenos	Ο σπαγγοραμένος	Stavros
1969	O gois	Ο γόης	a billiard customer
1969	Kakos, psychros kai anapodos	Κακός, ψυχρός και ανάποδος	Thymios' buddy
1969	Isea... mi horevis	Ησαΐα... μη χορεύεις	-
1960	I orea tou kourea	Η ωραία του κουρέα	Kostas
1969	Enas magkas sta salonia	Ένας μάγκας στα σαλόνια A Gentleman in the Family Room	Nikolas
1970	Enas Vengos gia oles tis douleis	Ένας Βέγγος για όλες τις δουλειές A Vengos/Veggos for all His Chores	-
