= Exo oi kleftes =

Exo oi kleftes Έξω οι κλέφτες
- Directed by: Kostas Andritsos
- Written by: Giorgos Lazaridis
- Produced by: The Roussopoulos Brothers
- Starring: Orestis Makris; Dionysis Papagiannopoulos; Martha Karagianni; Andreas Douzos; Theano Ioannidou; Ana Paitatzi; Koulis Stoligas; Maria Voulgari; Dora Anagnostopoulou; Angelos Mavropoulos; Kostas Papageorgiou
- Music by: Gerasimos Lavranos
- Release date: 1961
- Running time: 87 minutes
- Country: Greece
- Language: Greek

Exo oi kleftes (Greek: Greek: Έξω οι κλέφτες, Translations: Leave You Thieves and Get Out You Thieves) is a 1961 Greek comedy film directed by Kostas Andritsos and stars Orestis Makris, Dionysis Papayiannopoulos, Dimitris Nikolaidis, Martha Karagianni, Andreas Douzos, Koulis Stoligas, etc. The movie was based on a theatrical play by Stefanos Fotiadis.

== Plot ==
The honest and poor professor of theology learned as a very rich man, he also had an unprepared brother which he was very sick and which his courage that he restored that he done bad and participated into the running of a large factory. He made it without knowing his brakes and his factory was about to be robbed. He finally knew his brakes and kicked out all the thieves.

== Cast ==
- Orestis Makris ..... Timoleon Adamantas
- Dionysis Papagiannopoulos ..... Cleanthes Kleftodimos
- Martha Karagianni ..... Margarita
- Andreas Douzos ..... Andreas Adamantas
- Theano Ioannidou ..... Lily Kleftodimou
- Anna Paitatzi ..... Persefoni Adamanta
- Koulis Stoligas ..... Gerasimos
- Maria Voulgari ...... Triantafyllia Adamanta
- Dora Anagnostopoulou
- Angelos Mavropoulos ..... Mavrogenis
- Kostas Papageorgiou
- Kostas Pappas ..... Prokopis Adamantas
