= Vasilis Tsivilikas =

Greek film, television, and theater actor, comedian

- Born: January 17, 1942; Thessaloniki, Greece
- Died: February 29, 2012 (aged 70); Athens, Greece
- Occupations: Actor, director
- Years active: 1965–2012

Vasilis Tsivilikas (Thessaloniki, January 17, 1942 – Athens, February 29, 2012) was a Greek comedy actor with significant appearances in the Greek film industry, television and especially theater.

== Biography ==
He was born on January 17, 1942, in Thessaloniki, originated from Domnista and Megalo Chorio Evrytanias. He was the first child of his family that later additionally had two daughters. His sister Eleni Tsivilika is an archaeologist of National Archaeological Museum of Athens, with excavations in Crete and Cyclades. His father, a shopkeeper, provided for his family a comfortable life and loved theater.

He studied at the American College of Thessaloniki "Anatolia". His professors there urged him to engage with acting, initially by participating in school's theatrical team. After completing his undergraduate courses he was accepted into the School of English Language and Literature, from which he dropped out to move to Athens and to eventually move forward professionally with acting.

After a failed attempt to be accepted in Theatro Technis, he eventually studied acting in the acting school of Pelos Katselis.

His first theatrical performance was in 1965 at Nea Ionia. Two years later Karolos Koun invited him to Theatro Technis. In early 1970s he got involved with satire plays and in the mid-1970s with prose.

70s was the decade he first appeared in cinema. The first movie he appeared in was I theia mou, i hipissa by Alekos Sakellarios.

On February 29, 2012, at the age of 70, he had a heart complication and died during his transfer to Sismanogleio General Hospital.

He was married to lawyer Aliki Tsivilika and was father of one son and one daughter.

He performed in theater until his last day, at the play "I zoi podilato".

== Filmography ==
=== Cinema ===
- Xafnikos peirasmos 1988
- Poniro tet-a-tet 1987
- I garsoniera tis trellas 1986
- Sou harizo ti gynaika mou 1986
- Apopse tha ti vroume! 1985
- Ena tragoudi tha sou po... 1985
- Pantreftite giati hanomaste 1985
- To eidolo 1985
- Tora thelo... tora! 1980
- Psyhi kai sarka 1974
- I Rena einai 'off-side' 1972
- O kyrios stathmarhis 1972
- O magas me to trikyklo 1972
- O katergaris 1971
- Ziteitai epeigontos gabros 1971
- I theia mou, i hipissa 1970

=== Television ===
- Pos na klepsete tous klironomous sas (TV Movie) 2007
- Ohi tora agapoula (TV Movie) 2006
- Baby Style (TV Series) 2001
- Oute gata oute zimia (TV Movie) 2001
- Aroma gynaikas (TV Series) 2000
- Pyrotehnimata sto tsepaki sou (TV Movie) 1999
- Oti peite upourge mou (TV Movie) 1998
- Hi Rock (TV Series) 1992
- O kyrios synigoros (TV Series) 1990
- Vradya epitheorisis (TV Series) 1984
- Theoi ston Olympo (TV Series) 1978
- Antipetherini (TV Movie) 1978
- Istories horis dakrya (TV Series) 1977
- Thomas epi... Kolono (TV Series) 1977
- Hilia hronia prin – Vyzantio: I giorti ton Kalendon (TV Movie) 1977
- Atsides... (TV Series) 1976
- Viva Katerina (TV Series) 1973
- En touto nika (TV Series) 1973
- Axiomatikos ypiresias (TV Series short) 1972
- To theatro tis Defteras (TV Series) 1970

== Theatrical performances ==
- Zoi podilato (adapt. 'A Bedfull of Foreigners' by Dave Freeman, adapt.-dir. V. Tsivilikas, theater Academos theater, Avlea theater 2011–2012).
- Lysistrata (Aristophanes, dir. Th. Karakatsani, trans. K. Myris, summer 2011)
- Thesmophoriazusae (Aristophanes, dir. N. Charalambous, trans. K. Georgousopoulos, summer 2009)
- The Doctor in Spite of Himself (Molière, trans. K. Georgousopoulos, dir. V. Tsivilikas, summer 2008)
- Out of Order (Ray Cooney, trans. V. Tsivilikas, Peroke theater, winter 2008)
- L'Étourdi ou les Contretemps (Molière, dir. V. Tsivilikas, Peroke theater 2004–2005 and summer 2005)
- The Miser (Molière, dir. Κ. Damati, trans. Ερ. Μπελιέ, summers 2003–2007)
- Tons of Money (Α.Αyckbourn, W.Evans, A. Valentine, trans.-dir. V. Tsivilikas, Peroke theater 2006–2007).
- Not Now, Darling (Ray Cooney, John Chapman, trans. V. Tsivilikas, Minoa theater 2005–2006).
- Caught in the Net (Ray Cooney, adapt.-dir. V. Tsivilikas, Minoa theater 2004–2005).
- Methysmena koufeta (trans.-dir. V. Tsivilikas, Gloria theater 2003–2004).
- The Secretary Bird (William Douglas-Home, dir. V. Tsivilikas) 2003.
- Uproar in the House (A. Marriott-A. Foot, adapt.-dir. V. Tsivilikas, theater Park 2002).
- Funny Money (Ray Cooney, trans.-dir. V. Tsivilikas, Gloria theater 2001–2002)
- Oute gata oute zimia (Sakellarios-Giannakopoulos, dir. K. Tsianos, theater Park 2001)
- A Bedfull of Foreigners (Dave Freeman, trans.-dir. V. Tsivilikas, Minoa theater 1999–2000)
- Ke o Simitis thelei ton Germano tou (Michailidis-Makridis, Delfinario theater 1999).
- Oloi sto kolpo (Mark Stone, dir. V. Tsivilikas, Minoa theater 1999).
- Darling Mr. London (A. Marriott-B. Grant, dir. V. Tsivilikas, Minoa theater 1998–1999)
- Athina 2000...me ta tessera (dir. V. Tsivilikas, Minoa theater 1997–1998)
- Out of Order (Ray Cooney, dir. V. Tsivilikas, theater ΠΕΡΟΚΕ 1998)
- Skaei nyfi...SKAI gampros (Kambanis-Makridis-Georgiou, dir. V. Tsivilikas-Ε. Xanthopoulou, Metropolitan theater 1997).
- Treis pano dyo kato (Kambanis-Makridis, Peroke theater 1996–1997).
- Bob and Mary (G. Margaritis, dir. V. Tsivilikas-Γ. Φίλη, Lampeti theater 1995–1996)
- Posa kerakia ehei i tourta? (Kambanis-Makridis, dir. V. Tsivilikas, Kalouta theater 1995).
- Ke mazi ke monos (N. Kambanis-V. Michailidis, Kalouta theater 1993–1994, Metropolitan theater 1994–1995)
- Ela to vrady tha ime me mia fili sou (Kambanis-Makridis, dir. V. Tsivilikas, Kalouta theater 1992–1993, Metropolitan theater summer 1993).
- Xypoliti sto parko (1977)
- Kampiria (1975)
- Tou antra tou polla vary (1972)
- O peirasmos (G. Xenopoulos)
- Epiloges (Bost)
- The Birds (Aristophanes)
- Pepsie (Pierre-Edmond Victor)
- The Wedding (A. Chekhov)
- Agia Ioanna (1966, Dionysia theater)

== Sources ==
- Πινακοθήκη Γέλιου,από το Λογοθετίδη και μετά, Κώστας Παπασπήλιος, Εμπειρία εκδοτική, 2002, ISBN 960-417-002-3, σελ. 158–167
- «Βασίλης Τσιβιλίκας: Δεν με ενδιαφέρουν οι μυημένοι», "Το Βήμα", 14 Ιανουαρίου 2001, ανακτήθηκε 19 Σεπτεμβρίου 2008.
