= The Auntie from Chicago =

The Auntie from Chicago Η θεία από το Σικάγο
- Directed by: Alekos Sakellarios (crew)
- Produced by: Alekos Sakellarios
- Starring: Georgia Vasileiadou; Orestis Makris; Eleni Zafeiriou; Tzeni Karezi; Gelly Mavropoulou; Margarita Papageorgiou; Niki Papadatou; Pantelis Zervos; Stefanos Stratigos; Thodoros Dimitriou; Dimitris Papamichael; Vangelis Ploios; Kostas Papahristos
- Edited by: Dinos Katsouridis
- Music by: Takis Morakis
- Distributed by: Finos Films
- Release date: 16 December 1957
- Running time: 72 minutes
- Country: Greece
- Language: Greek

The Auntie from Chicago (Greek: Η θεία από το Σικάγο Ê theía apó to Sikágo; also known as Aunt from Chicago) is a 1957 Greek theatrical comedy film directed by Alekos Sakellarios and produced by Finos Films. The film made 142,459 tickets.

== Plot ==
A middle-aged man's (Makris) conservative life is disturbed, when his sister (Vasileiadou) returns to Greece, after many years in Chicago. Her arrival breathes new air to the family, leading to some extreme ideas of how to get her shy nieces to marry.

== Cast ==
- Orestis Makris as Harilaos Bardas
- Georgia Vasileiadou as Kalliopi Papas
- Eleni Zafeiriou as Efterpi Barda (wife of Harilaos)
- Gelly Mavropoulou as Eleni Barda (daughter)
- Tzeni Karezi as Katina Barda (daughter)
- Margarita Papageorgiou as Angeliki Barda (daughter)
- Pantelis Zervos as Xenofon Vlassopoulos
- Stefanos Stratigos as Nikos Kadris
- Thodoros Dimitriou as Takis Zerigkas
- Dimitris Papamichael as Kostakis
- Vangelis Ploios as guy from the beach
- Kostas Papahristos as police officer
