= Kalos ilthe to dollario =

1967 Greek theatrical comedy film

Kalos ilthe ton dollario Καλώς ήλθε το δολλάριο
- Directed by: Alekos Sakellarios
- Written by: Alekos Sakellarios
- Produced by: Giorgos Zervos
- Starring: Giorgos Konstadinou; Anna Kalouta; Sotiris Moustakas
- Distributed by: Anzervos; Orwo Hellas
- Release date: 23 October 1967 (Greece)
- Running time: 99 minutes
- Country: Greece
- Language: Greek

Kalos ilthe to dollario (Greek: Greek: Καλώς ήλθε το δολλάριο, Welcome, dollar) is a 1967 Greek comedy film directed by Alekos Sakellarios, based on the theatrical work The 6th American Fleet by Alekos Sakellarios and Christos Giannakiopoulos. The film stars Giorgos Konstantinou, Anna Kalouta.. It was shown at the 1967 Thessaloniki Film Festival.

== Cast ==
- Giorgos Konstantinou - Filippos Angeloutsos
- Anna Kalouta - Madame Fouli
- Sasa Kastoura - Gina
- Niki Linardou - Liza
- Sotiris Moustakas - Henri
- Nikos Fermas - Stavros
- Orfeas Zachos - Kimon Angeloutsos
- Joly Garbi - Mrs. Angeloutsou
- Alekos Tzanetakos - Takis Angeloutsos
- Christos Doxaras - 'Giannis
- Makis Demiris - Thanasis
- Kostas Mentis - 'Grigoris'
- Kostas Papahristos - 'Agisilaos Merminopoulos'
- Stella Stratigou - 'Liana'
- Athinodoros Prousallis - 'Stamatis Tsimbas'
- Kostas Kafassis - 'Dimitris'
- Alekos Sakellarios - 'Andreas'
