= Giorgos Messalas =

Greek actor and director (1942–2021)

Giorgos Messalas Γιώργος Μεσσάλας
- Born: 14 November 1942; Aigaleo, Athens, Greece
- Died: 20 July 2021 (aged 78)
- Occupation: actor

Giorgos Messalas (Greek: Γιώργος Μεσσάλας, 14 November 1942 – 20 July 2021) was a Greek actor and director in theater and movies.

== Biography ==
Messalas studied at the Dramatic School and worked in different theatres and at Proskinio by Alexis Solomos. He took part in protagonistic roles including works by Molière in 1969, Mayakovski in 1969, Federico García Lorca in 1970, Brecht in 1970 and so on.

Messalas ran the Modern Theatre in 1973 and co-directed Little Potatoes with A. Wesker. He also directed and acted in the work Nights of Assassination in 1974.

He took part in a classic repertory and directed several plays at the Irodeio in Lykavittos, at the Free Theater and others, he also did period in the entire nation.

From 1992, he only sheltered himself at Alkyonida since he had presented the studied work and at the children's stage.

He was an assistant director for Alexis Solomos and took part in greatest plays at the National Theatre and in the United States, Russia, China, Japan, France, Belgium and Yugoslavia.

Messalas died on 20 July 2021, aged 78.

== Filmography ==
Year	Film title (English translation)	Original title and transliteration	Role
1971	Agapissa mia polithrona	Αγάπησα μια πολυθρόνα	Auctioneer
