= Gizela Dali =

Greek actress

Gizela Dali (Greek: Γκιζέλα Ντάλι; born Adamantia Mavroidi; Greek: Αδαμαντία Μαυροειδή; 23 August 1937 – 10 September 2010) was a Greek actress. She was born in 1937 in Plaka, Athens, and she died of cancer in 2010 in Naxos, aged 73. She played various lead roles in Greek and British feature films during the 1960s-70s, including in the thrillers Aimilia, the Psychopath and The Sexy Mirella, in which she played the title character.

== Filmography ==
- Testosterone (2004)
- Fountains of Lust (1976) – Eftyhia
- Aimilia, the Psychopath (1974) – Aimilia / Aimilia's mother
- Image of Love (1973) – Eliza
- Passion Beach (1973) – Mary
- The Sexy Mirella (1973) – Mirella
- O Kyklos tis Anomalias (1971) – Anna Levidi
- The Executioner (1970) – Anna
- Polytehnitis kai erimospitis (1963) – Lucia
- Betty is getting married (1961) – Betty
- İstanbul'da aşk başkadır (1961)
- Three Girls from America (1964)
