= The Countess of Corfu =

The Countess of Corfu I Komissa tis Kerkyras
- Film poster
- Directed by: Alekos Sakellarios
- Written by: Alekos Sakellarios
- Produced by: Finos Film
- Starring: Rena Vlahopoulou
- Music by: Giorgos Katsaros
- Production company: Finos Film
- Release date: 7 February 1972
- Running time: 84 minutes
- Country: Greece
- Language: Greek

The Countess of Corfu (Greek: Η Κόμησσα Της Κέρκυρας, romanized: I Komissa tis Kerkyras) is a 1972 film starring Rena Vlahopoulou, Alekos Alexandrakis and Nonika Galinea. The movie was filmed in Corfu, the birthplace of Rena Vlahopoulou.

== Plot ==
Rena Vlahopoulou plays signora Antzolina, an old-time Corfiote aristocratic lady who has fallen on hard times and is working as a piano teacher while reminiscing of her old romance with her lost fiancé. She lives in her palatial mansion in Corfu which becomes the object of desire of Sotiris Karelis, an entrepreneur, who wants to convert it into a hotel. Karelis romances the old aristocrat thinking that at a suitable price she will eventually agree to sell her mansion to him. When she resists, he tells her a story about how he is friends with her lost fiancé.

An Italian musical group arrives in Corfu and she accommodates them in her mansion. Her hospitality extends to also helping the Italian musicians by replacing their lead singer Alinda Ritsi who has left the group. However Alinda changes her mind and arrives in Corfu intent on joining the group once more. Comedy ensues when the identities of the two singers get all mixed up and when the lost fiancé of Antzolina turns out to be the escort of the Italian singer.

The movie was filmed during the Papadopoulos dictatorship years and this is reflected in the film by the characters being closely followed by policemen who watch them. In the end love and fun prevail and Sotiris falls for Antzolina.

== Music ==
The theme song of the film makes mention of many Corfu landmarks such as Benitses, the Spianada, Palaiokastritsa and Pontikonisi. Angelos Sakellarios wrote the lyrics of the theme song but he obtained advice from the Corfiotes in the film like Giorgos Katsaros and the star Rena Vlahopoulou who guided him regarding the places that were to be included in the song. The song became a classic of "tourist folk".

== Locale ==
The film showcased the cantounia of the old city of Corfu, the Achilleion, luxury hotels and famous beaches of the island like Palaiokastritsa which became the background of elaborate dance routines by the veteran Greek dance group of the 70s led by Fotis Metaxopoulos and his partner Nadia Fontana.

== Box office ==
The movie was the ninth most popular Greek film of 1972 with 310,583 tickets.

== Cast ==
- Rena Vlahopoulou ..... Angolina
- Alekos Alexandrakis ..... Sotiris Karelis
- Nonika Galinea ..... Froso
- Makis Demiris ..... Kostas
- Vangelis Ploios
- Orfeas Zahos ..... Pipis Karetas
- Manolis Destounis ..... Gerasimos
- Alekos Sakellarios ..... Dimitris

== Release ==
The film premiered in Greece on 7 February 1972.
