= The Executioner (1970 film) =

1970 British film directed by Sam Wanamaker

- Film poster
- Directed by: Sam Wanamaker
- Written by: Jack Pulman
- Story by: Gordon McDonell
- Produced by: Charles H. Schneer
- Starring: George Peppard
- Cinematography: Denys N. Coop (as Denys Coop)
- Edited by: R. Watts
- Music by: Ron Goodwin
- Color process: Eastmancolor
- Production company: Ameran Films
- Distributed by: Columbia Pictures
- Release dates: 2 July 1970 (London); 16 September 1970 (NYC)
- Running time: 111 minutes
- Country: United Kingdom
- Language: English

The Executioner is a 1970 British Cold War neo noir spy thriller film directed by Sam Wanamaker in Panavision and starring George Peppard as secret agent John Shay who suspects his colleague Adam Booth, played by Keith Michell, is a double agent. It was produced by Charles H. Schneer for Columbia Pictures and filmed in Panavision and Eastmancolor.

== Plot ==
John Shay, a British MI5 agent, had grown up in the United States, and was nearly killed while on assignment abroad. Convinced that he was framed, he returns to London to uncover the mole responsible for the set-up. Shay suspects that his colleague Adam Booth is a Russian spy. The action takes place in London, Athens, Istanbul and Corfu, where Shay goes in his investigation trying to gather evidence that Booth is a double agent. When Shay's superiors are not convinced, and even after a hearing clears Booth of wrongdoing, he takes matters into his own hands and kills Booth.

Shay assumes the identity of Booth, and with the assistance of Booth's widow Sarah and his own girlfriend Polly, he launches into an investigation to uncover Booth's connections. Shay maintains a romantic relationship with both women. Booth's wife is the romantic interest of Shay and British scientist Philip Crawford, who provided information to Shay about Booth being a double agent. Shay's superiors are Col. Scott and Vaughan Jones. Polly assists him in his investigations by providing him with information apparently confirming his suspicions.

Shay finds a plane ticket in Booth's pocket which he then uses to fly to Athens along with Booth's widow, who is unaware that her husband has been murdered by Shay. Upon arrival in Athens, Shay assumes Booth's identity and subsequently goes to Corfu, where he is captured along with Sarah by Soviet agents who want Crawford in return for the freedom of their captives. A CIA agent under the name of Professor Parker manages to free them both. Colonel Scott (Shay's superior) reveals that Booth was indeed a double agent who was used by MI5 to supply the Soviets with false information.

== Cast ==
- George Peppard as John Shay
- Joan Collins as Sarah Booth
- Judy Geeson as Polly Bendel
- Oskar Homolka as Racovsky
- Charles Gray as Vaughan Jones
- Nigel Patrick as Colonel Scott
- Keith Michell as Adam Booth
- George Baker as Phillip Crawford
- Alexander Scourby as Prof. Parker
- Peter Bull as Butterfield
- Ernest Clark as Roper
- Peter Dyneley as Balkov
- Gizela Dali as Anna

== Production ==
It was one of a series of medium budgeted genre pictures Peppard made around this time.

== Reception ==
Film and Television Daily writes that the film recreates in an exciting way the "recurring themes" of espionage and counter-espionage, that "embrace the fantastic and implausible".

Variety criticises the redundancy in the film and calls it a "triple-cross suspenser" where "interest fades fast".

Paul Mavis writes that the film has a "twisty plot" and a good cast and praises the direction of Wanamaker but criticises the complexity of the plot which, according to Mavis, clashes with the action parts. Mavis also calls for "tighter editing".

The book Film Fatales: Women in Espionage Films and Television, 1962-1973 calls Peppard's acting "easygoing" and criticises Wanamaker's direction as making the film feel slower-paced than it actually is.

Films and Filming writes that Peppard plays his role in such wooden fashion as to make a believable spy but sometimes "he overemphasises his inflexibility"; however, director Wanamaker keeps the pace tight enough that Peppard's inflexibility does not really affect the film to any great extent.
