= Woe to the Young =

Woe to the Young Αλίμονο στους νέους
- Directed by: Alekos Sakellarios
- Written by: Alekos Sakellarios; Christos Giannkopoulos
- Produced by: Axarlis; Alekos Papageorgiou; Alekos Sakellarios
- Starring: Dimitris Horn; Maro Kontou; Smaro Stefanidou; Andreas Douzos; Giorgos Velentzas
- Music by: Manos Hatzidakis
- Release date: 30 October 1961
- Running time: 89 minutes
- Country: Greece
- Language: Greek

Woe to the Young (Greek: Αλίμονο στους νέους) is a Greek 1961 film loosely based on the myth of Faust.

== Plot ==
The story concerns a rich old man named Andreas, who wants to be young again so as to marry a young girl, that makes a deal with the Devil. He becomes young but poor and the little money he has he spends. Moreover, the girl - after her mother's coercion - rejects him and wounds up marrying another rich old man. The film ends with Andreas waking up, realizing this was all but a dream.

== Cast ==
- Dimitris Horn as Andreas
- Maro Kontou as Rita
- Smaro Stefanidou as Eleni
- Andreas Douzos as Manolis
- Giorgos Velentzas as doctor
- Spyros Mousouris as Agisilaos
- Nikos Fermas as junkman
- Yvoni Vladimirou as maid
