= Georgia Vasileiadou =

Greek actress

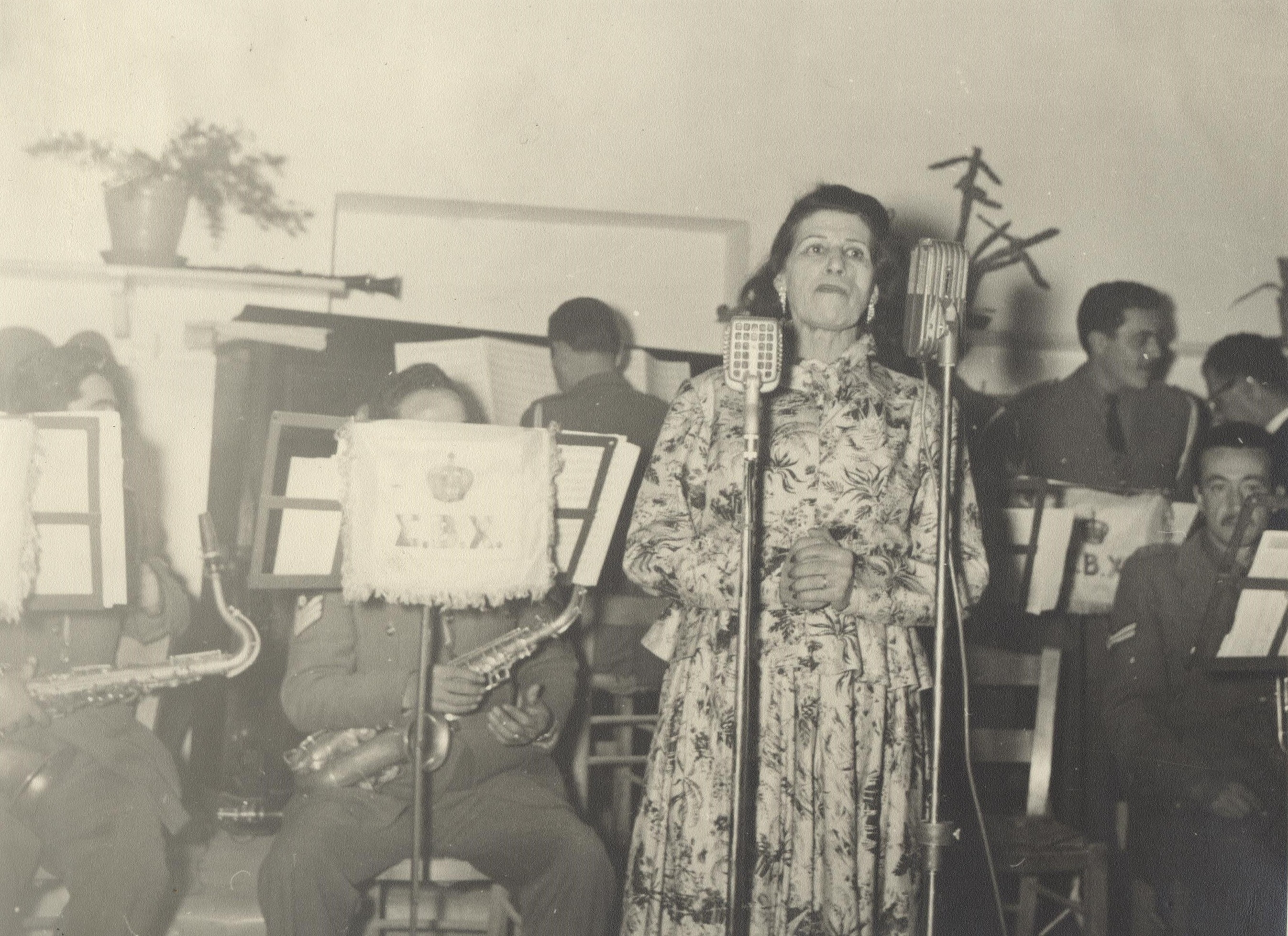
- Born: 1897; Kypseli, Athens, Greece
- Died: 12 February 1980 (aged 82–83); Athens, Greece
- Occupation: Actress
- Years active: 1930–1977

Georgia Vasileiadou (Greek: Γεωργία Βασιλειάδου; 1897 – 12 February 1980) was a Greek actress. She appeared in more than forty films from 1930 to 1977.

== Selected filmography ==
Year	Title	Role
1956	The Fortune Teller	Kalliopi
1957	The Auntie from Chicago	Kalliopi Pappas
1959	Astero	Stamatina
1959	Dead Man's Treasure	Theoni
1959	Bouboulina	Paraskevoula
1966	Dancing the Sirtaki	Evanthia
