= Aleko (given name) =

Aleko is a masculine given name, sometimes a short form of Alexandros or an affectionate diminutive of Aleksandre. It may refer to:

- Alexandros Goulandris (1927–2017), Greek shipowner and philanthropist.
- Aleko Bregu (born 2 July 1957) is a former Albanian footballer.
- Aleko Konstantinov (1863–1897), Bulgarian writer.
- Aleko Lilius (1890–1977), Russian-born explorer, businessman, diplomat, writer, journalist and photographer.
- Aleko Mulos, was an Ottoman gymnast. He competed in the men's artistic individual all-around event at the 1908 Summer Olympics.
- Aleko Pilika (1940), former Albanian footballer and football manager.
- Aleko Prodani (1942–2006), Albanian actor.
- Alexandros Schinas (c. 1870–1913), assassin of King George I of Greece.
- Aleko Yordan (born 1936), Turkish former footballer.

== See also ==
- Alekos, another short form of Alexandros
