= Koulis Stoligkas =

Greek actor

Koulis (Ioannis) Stoligkas or Stoligas (Greek: Κούλης Στολίγκας) (1909 or 1910, Drama, Salonica Vilayet, Ottoman Empire – 25 February 1984, Athens), was a Greek actor, one of the most loved stars in Greek cinema and played in several movies including Exo oi kleftes (Go away you thieves). He lived his final years away from the limelight with his two sisters and had no children. He was buried at the cemetery of Kokkinos Mylos in Nea Filadelfeia, Athens.
