= Kostas Palios =

Greek actor

Kostas Palios Κώστας Παληός
- Born: 1926; Amorgos, Greece
- Died: December 26, 1996; Greece
- Occupation: actor

Konstantinos (Kostas) Palios (Greek: Κώστας Παληός; 1926 – December 26, 1996) was a Greek actor. He played secondary roles in many movies. His most popular appearance was in The kopani of Giorgos Konstantinou as a paper robber duke. His final appearance of his career was in the serial Sofia orthi. He played in 37 movies and 6 television series.

== Partial filmography ==
Year	Film title (English translation)	Original title and transliteration	Role
1966	Pligoses ti agapo mou	Πλήγωσες την αγάπη μου	-
1970	I aristokratisa ki o alitis	Η αριστοκράτισσα κι ο αλήτης	Antoniou
1971	Agapissa enan aliti	Αγάπησα έναν αλήτη	-
1972	I fandasmenos	Ο φαντασμένος	Admiral Melemetzidis
1972	Agapi mou paliogria	Αγάπη μου, παλιόγρια	a doctor
1980	Kathenas me tin trela tou	Καθένας με την τρέλα του	Stamatis
1982	Pater gkomenios	Πάτερ γκομένιος	Kakalessis

=== In television ===
- Sofia orthi (Σοφία ορθή)
