= Nikitas Platis =

Greek actor

Nikitas Platis Νικήτας Πλατής
- Born: 1912; Amorgos, Greece
- Died: November 14, 1984; Athens, Greece
- Occupation: actor

Nikitas Platis (Greek: Νικήτας Πλατής; 1912 – November 14, 1984) was a Greek actor in theater and movies. He was the husband of an actress Golfo Bini. He took part in a television series Methoriakos stathmos in which he done an unforgettable emphasis as a leader of opposition of a community which was founded in a difficult point with the communal leader. He died on November 14, 1981, and is buried at Kokkinos Mylos cemetery. He raised a son Sotirios in which he later died.

== Filmography ==
=== As cinematographer ===
Year	Film title (English translation)	Original title and transliteration	Role
1958	O Mimikos kai i Mairi	Ο Μιμίκος και η Μαίρη; Mikimos and Mary	Mr. Panagiotis
1958	I kyra mas i mami	Η κυρά μας η μαμή	a dancer with a toothache
1960	Christina	Χριστίνα	a cafe worker
1962	Sidewalk	Πεζοδρόμιο; Pezodromio	-
1962	Some Like it Cool	Μερικοί το προτιμούν κρύο Meriki to protimoun krio	Thanassis Nikolaidis
1963	The Lucky Pants	Το τυχερό παντελόνι To tihero padeloni	a customer from a laundry outlet
1963	Politehnitis ke erimospitis	Πολυτεχνίτης και ερημοσπίτης	a restaurant manager
1963	My Friend Lefterakis	Ο φίλος μου ο Λευτεράκης; O filos mou o Lefterakis	
1964	Lenio i voskopoula	Λενιώ η βοσκοπούλα	-
1964	I klironomi	Οι κληρονόμοι	Haris
1964	I'm Going to Make You Queen	Θα σε κάνω βασίλισσα Tha se kano vassilisa	a police officer
1964	The Card Player	Η χαρτοπαίχτρα O hartopehtria	Panimos Stravokanis
1965	Teddy Boy My Love	Τέντυ μπόι αγάπη μου Teddy Boy agapi mou	Assimakis Matsakoulias
1965	Fonazei o kleftis	Φωνάζει ο κλέφτης	a police officer
1965	Ftochos alla timios	Φτωχός αλλά τίμιος	-
1965	Yparchei kai filotimo	Υπάρχει και φιλότιμο	Fotis
1965	Modern Cinderella	Μοντέρνα σταχτοπούτα Moderna stahtopouta	Georgiadis
1965	Kardia mou papse na ponas	Καρδιά νου πάψε να πονάς	a police officer
1965	Kalio pende ke sto heri	Κάλιο πέντε και στο χέρι	
1965	Kai oi 14 itan yperochoi	Και οι 14 ήταν υπέροχοι	-
1965	I istoria mias zois	Η ιστορία μιας ζωής	-
1966	My Daughter, the Socialist	Η κόρη μου η σοσιαλίστρια	Dimitris Dimitriou
1966	O adelfos mou o lordos	Ο αδελφός μου ο λόρδος	-
1966	T adelfia mou	Τ' αδέλφια μου	Kostas Geranis
1966	O Meletis stin ameso drasi	Ο Μελέτης στην άμεσο δράση	-
1966	Tora pou fevgo ap' ti zoi	Τώρα που φεύγω απ' τη ζωή	Miltos
1966	Sklavoi tis moiras	Σκλάβοι της μοίρας	a father
1966	O exypnakias	Ο εξυπνάκιας	Panos, a paper chairman
1966	O anthropos pou yitiise ap ton pono	Ο άνθρωπος που γύρισε απ' τον πόνο A Man That Returns from the Pain	-
1966	O adelfos mou o trelaras	Ο αδελφός μου ο τρελάρας My Lazy Brother	Trifonas
1966	Cleopatra was Andonis (Anthony)	Η Κλεοπάτρα ήταν Αντώνης; I Kleopatra itan Antonia or Η Κλεοπάτρα εν δράσει I Kleopatra en drasei	Menelaos ή
1966	Diplopennies	Διπλοπεννιές	Vassilis
1966	5,000 Lies	5.000 ψέμματα 5.000 psemata	Minas
1967	The Most Shiniest Star	Το πιο λαμπρό αστέρι To pio lambro asteri	Menexes
1967	Ta dolaria tis Aspassias	Τα δολάρια της Ασπασίας; Aspasia's Dollar	Giorgos
1967	Mias pentaras niata	Μιας πεντάρας νιάτα	Tsevas Tegoulas
1967	Kapote klene ke o dinati	Κάποτε κλαίνε και οι δυνατοί	Theodorou
1968	I thirorina	Η θυρωρίνα	Andonis
1968	O palatsos	Ο παλιάτσος	Sofridoglou
1968	I ziliara	Η ζηλιάρα	a police officer
1968	Xerizomeni genia	Ξεριζωμένη γενηά	Vangelis
1968	O trelos ta 'hei 400	Ο τρελός τα 'χει 400	a police officer
1968	Taeinos kai katafronemenos	Ταπεινός και καταφρονεμένος	-
1968	To Propo kai ta bouzoukia	Το Προπό και τα μπουζούκια	Trifonas Kourkoulendzos
1969	To afentiko mou itan koroido	Το αφεντικό μου ήταν κορόϊδο	-
1969	I oraia tou kourea	Η ωραία του κουρέα	Fotis
1969	Isaia mi choreveis	Ησαΐα μη χορεύεις	Lefteris Sotiriou
1969	To thyma	Το θύμα	Anestis Kaloumbas
1969	I Smyrnia/I Smirnia	Η Σμυρνιά	Issidoros
1969	Enas andras me syneidisi	Ένας άντρας με συνείδηση	Michalis
1970	The Kiosk	Η περιπτερού	Thodoros
1970	Enas Kitsos sta bouzoukia	Ένας Κίτσος στα μπουζούκια	Stamatis
1970	Enas hippis me filotimo	Ένας χίππης με φιλότιμο	Vrassidas Perlepes
1970	I aristokratissa kai o alitis	Η αριστοκράτισσα και ο αλήτης	Andreas Papadimas
1970	I teseris asi	Οι τέσσερις άσσοι The Four Aces	-
1970	Enas trelos glentzes	Ένας τρελός γλεντζές	a police officer
1970	I taxitzou	Η ταξιτζού	-
1970	I tychi mou trelatike	Η τύχη μου τρελάθηκε My Happiness Went Crazy	Hadjiskourias
1970	O xerokefalos	Ο ξεροκέφαλος	-
1970	O archipseftaros	Ο αρχιψεύταρος	Prokopis
1971	I zavoliara	Η ζαβολιάρα	-
1971	October 28, 5:30 AM	28η Οκτωβρίου ώρα 5:30; 28 Oktovriou ora 5:30	-
1971	Ti ekanes ston polemo, Thanasi;	Τι έκανες στον πόλεμο, Θανάση;What Did You Do in the War, Thanassi;	Thodoros
1971	Agapissa mia polythrona	Αγάπησα μια πολυθρόνα	Dimitris Nikolaou
1971	I efoplistina	Η εφοπλιστίνα	Loukas
1971	Enas gabros polla elafrys	Ένας γαμπρός πολλά ελαφρύς A Very Heavy Husband	a newspaper journalist
1972	Erotas kai prodosia	Έρωτας και προδοσία	-
1972	I proedrina	Η προεδρίνα The (Lady) President	a police officer
1972	O anthropos pou espage plaka	Ο άνθρωπος που έσπαγε πλάκα	Iraklis
1979	Mona... zyga dika mou	Μονά... ζυγά δικά μου	-
