= Giorgos Gavriilidis =

Greek actor

Giorgos Gavriilidis Γιώργος Γαβριηλίδης
- Born: 1908; Nikaia (north of Piraeus), Greece
- Died: 23 July 1982 (aged 73–74); Athens, Greece
- Occupation: actor

Giorgos Gavriilidis (Greek: Γιώργος Γαβριηλίδης; 1908 – 23 July 1982) was a Greek actor.

He was the husband of Marika Krevata (1910 - 14 September 1994). He was marked out from the theatre and played roles in many comedies in the cinema and later on television.

He died on 23 July 1982 from pneumonic edema and was buried at the Third Cemetery in Nikaia north of Piraeus and west of Athens.

== Filmography ==
Year	Film	Transliteration and translation	Role
1933	The Wrong Road	Κακός δρόμος = Kakos dromos	-
1957	Laterna, ftohia ke garifallo	Λατέρνα, φτώχεια και γαρύφαλλο = A Lantern, Poverty and a Flower	angry neighbor
1958	The Money	Ο λεφτάς = O leftas	father
1958	A Hero in his Slippers	Ένας ήρως με παντούφλες (A Hero With Slippers)	Angelos Stamoulis
1958	A Guy From the Train	Ο άνθρωπος του τρένου (O anthropos tou trenou)	Rodopoulos
1959	Stournara 288	Στουρνάρα 288	Thomas Asimomytis
1959	Loves of a Greek in Paris	Ένας Έλληνας στο Παρίσι (Enas Elinas sto Parissi)	-
1959	The Policeman of the 16th Precinct	Ο Ηλίας του 16ου (O Ilias tou 16ou)	Orestis
1961	Lathos ston erota	Λάθος στον έρωτα	Menelaos Labrinos
1962	Otan leipei i gata	Όταν λείπει η γάτα	Mr. Zeberis
1962	Law 4000	Nόμος 4000 (Nomos 4000)	a high school professor
1962	Katigoroummenos o eros	Κατηγορούμενος ο έρως	-
1962	Eteria thavmaton	Εταιρεία θαυμάτων	Mr. John
1962	Dimos from Trikala	Ο Δήμος από τα Τρίκαλα (O dimos apo tin Trikala)	-
1963	Polytehnitis kai erimospitis	Πολυτεχνίτης και ερημοσπίτης	father
1963	Lies for Seven Days	Επτά ημέρες ψέματα (Epta meres psemmata)	John
1963	Enas vlakas me patenda	Ένας βλάκας με πατέντα	-
1964	O eavtoulis mou	Ο εαυτούλης μου (Myself)	Ioakeim Danos
1964	The Twins	Τα δίδυμα (Ta didyma)	Pelopidas Chatzifrydis
1965	Yie mou, yie mou	Υιέ μου, υιέ μου	Mikes
1965	Kiss the girls	Κορίτσια για φίλημα (Koritsia gia filima)	Petros Ramoglou
1965	A Matter of Dignity	Υπάρχει και φιλότιμο	Kostas
1965	The Rich Milloinaire	Ο φτωχός εκατομμυριούχος (O ftohos ekatommyriouhos)	-
1966	I ginaika mou trellathike	Η γυναίκα μου τρελάθηκε (My Woman Went Crazy)	Spyros
1966	Fouskothalassies	Φουσκοθαλασσιές	Makris
1966	My Crazy Brother	Ο αδελφός μου ο τρελάρας (O adelfos mou o trelaras)	-
1967	Mias pendaras niata	Μιας πεντάρας νιάτα	Andreas Alafouzos
1967	A Penniless Money	Ένας απένταρος λεφτάς (Enas apentaros leftas)	Birdas's father
1967	O anakatosouras	Ο ανακατωσούρας	director of a car dealer company
1968	O petheropliktos	Ο πεθερόπληκτος	Xenofontas Hatzifardelis
1968	O Mnistres tis Pinelopis	Οι Μνηστήρες της Πηνελόπης (Penelope's Suitors)	Theophilos
1968	An Italian from Kypseli	Μια Ιταλίδα απ' την Κυψέλη (Mia Italida ap' ton Kypseli)	John Parker
1969	I pariziana	Η Παριζιάνα (I pariziana)	Mr. Kouloundris
1969	The Tale	Ο παραμυθάς (O paramythas)	Kosmas Karagiorgis
1969	I komissa tis fabrikas	Η κόμισσα της φάμπρικας	Admiral Papathanasiou
1969	O gois	Ο γόης	Spyros Veliris, father of single girls
1969	Two Feet in a Shoe	Δυο πόδια σ' ένα παπούτσι (Dyo podia s' ena papoutsi)	Ippokratis
1969	I arhonitssa ki o alitis	Η αρχόντισσα κι ο αλήτης	Mr. Evangeliou
1970	One Crazy, Crazy, 40-Year-Old Woman	Μια τρελή, τρελή σαραντάρα (Mia treli, terli sarantara)	Tzortzis Hadjithomas
1970	O aktynitos htypithike	Ο ακτύπητος χτυπήθηκε (An Unbeaten Was Hit)	Ilias Papamarkou
1971	Mia Ellinida sto haremi	Μια Ελληνίδα στο χαρέμι	Periklis Petropoulos
1971	Dyo modernoi glentzedes	Δυο μοντέρνοι γλεντζέδες	Alexandros Skouris
1972	Pos katantisame, Sotiri	Πώς καταντήσαμε, Σωτήρη	-
