= Aliki Vougiouklaki =

Greek actress, singer and theatrical producer (1934–1996)

- Αλίκη Βουγιουκλάκη
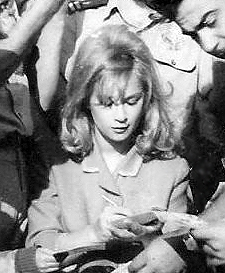
- Born: Aliki Stamatina Vougiouklaki; 20 July 1934; Marousi, Greece
- Died: 23 July 1996 (aged 62); Marousi, Greece
- Resting place: First Cemetery of Athens
- Education: National Theatre of Greece
- Occupations: Actress; singer; theatrical producer
- Years active: 1953–1996
- Relatives: Takis Vougiouklakis (brother)

Aliki Stamatina Vougiouklaki (Greek: Αλίκη Σταματίνα Βουγιουκλάκη Greek pronunciation: [aˈlici stamaˈtina vuʝuˈklaci]; 20 July 1934 – 23 July 1996) was a Greek cinema and theater actress and theatrical producer. She was one of the most popular actresses in Greece, and was often referred to as "the Star She performed in 60 plays, 43 films, 10 TV productions and for the radio, in every form of acting. Vougiouklaki died in 1996 at the age of 62, just three months after being diagnosed with pancreatic cancer.

Aliki Vougiouklaki made her stage debut in a 1953 Athens production of Molière's Le Malade imaginaire. Around the same time, she made her movie debut in The Little Mouse (1954). The majority of her movies met with great success and in 1960 she won the award for Best Actress at the Thessaloniki International Film Festival for her performance in the movie Madalena.

== Early life and education ==
Vougiouklaki was born in Marousi to Emmy Koumoundourou and Ioannis Vougiouklakis, a lawyer and the provincial governor of Arcadia in the Peloponnese during the war, who was executed by the resistance organisation ELAS. She had two brothers, Takis Vougiouklakis (film director) and Antonis (an architect). As a student, she participated in school plays, which eventually led her to an acting career. In 1952, she secretly auditioned for the National Theatre of Greece Drama School, passed the exams and started attending classes. She graduated three years later.

== Career ==
Her first theatrical role was in The Imaginary Invalid, Molière, in 1953, while her first movie, The Little Mouse, was in 1954. She appeared in movies, mostly musicals, television programs, and theatrical productions. She co-starred with Dimitris Papamichail in most of the movies and in a number of theatrical plays.

She received the prize for the lead woman's role at the inaugural Greek Cinema Festival in Thessaloniki in 1960 for her starring role in Madalena while the movie Ipolochagos Natassa (1970) was the biggest box office success in Greek Cinema.

In 1961 she established her own theatre company and presented successful theatrical plays. In 1962 she had a contract to star in Finos Films's English language film, Aliki, My love (also known as Aliki). It premiered in London and New York in June 1963, and in Athens in 1964. However, it didn't receive the expected success. The inability to be successful internationally was the reason she never attempted an "international movie star" career again.

She was popularly known in the press as the National Star of Greece—a term first used by the journalist Eleni Vlahou in 1959. Her last movie was "Nelly, The Spy" (Κατάσκοπος Νέλλη), in 1981. The decline of the Greek Cinema prompted her to concentrate on her theatrical career, acting and producing in 53 plays. In 1975 she staged large- scaled musicals which changed the usual Greek style of the theatrical musical.

In 2008, her son published a biography of Vougiouklaki, Eho Ena Mistiko (I Have A Secret), the title of a song she sang in Maiden's Cheek. That same year, a television series based on the book aired on the Alpha TV channel.

== Personal life ==
Vougiouklaki married her classmate of the National Theater Drama School and co-star, Dimitris Papamichail, on 18 January 1965. On 4 June 1969 she gave birth to their son, Yiannis Papamichail. The couple got divorced in 1975 due to "Irreconcilable Differences". In 1992, in an interview with Nikos Hadjinikolaou, Vougiouklaki revealed that she secretly married Giorgos Iliadis, a Greek Cypriot businessman, on 25 January 1982 in Athens. They had met in 1976. The couple divorced only a couple of months later, for personal reasons cited by Iliadis, which Vougiouklaki respected.

== Death ==
In April 1996, while on tour in Thessaloniki performing the Greek version of The Sound of Music play, Vougiouklaki had severe stomach aches which she believed were caused by the antibiotics she was taking due to a case of bronchitis which had been bothering her. After performing tests at the Express Service, a medical diagnostic centre in Thessaloniki, she was diagnosed with hepatoma, a malignant tumour in her liver. Not having realised the severity of the situation, she continued performing for another week before the tour was finally cancelled. Her last performance on stage was on 28 April.

In Athens, a group of three doctors discovered that the actress had pancreatic cancer. On 7 May she travelled to Munich, where she underwent a series of additional tests. On 10 May Vougiouklaki returned to Greece. On 15 May she travelled to the Massachusetts General Hospital in the U.S., in a final effort to be cured. On 19 May she returned permanently to Athens and finally, on 22 May, entered the Athens Medical Centre. On 14 July she fell into a hepatic coma and had no communication with those around her. After two months in hospital, she died on 23 July 1996, three days after her 62nd birthday, in the Athens Medical Centre.

Her funeral was held in the Μetropolitan Cathedral of Athens on 25 July 1996 and she was buried in the First Cemetery of Athens.

== Trivia ==
- The film I Aliki Sto Nautiko (1961) was filmed aboard the active Greek naval vessel Aetos D01, which previously saw action during World War 2 with the United States Navy as USS Slater DE-766. Slater now operates as a museum ship in Albany, NY.
- Chtipokardia sto thranio (1963) was shot simultaneously in Greek and Turkish, with two different crews. Vougiouklaki starred in both versions, with her voice being dubbed in the Turkish version, Siralardaki heyecanlar.
- The film, Ipolochagos Natassa (1970) sold 751,000 tickets in Athens, which made it the most successful film in Greece, a record held for almost three decades before being broken by Safe Sex.
- She worked with writer Willy Russell when she performed in Shirley Valentine onstage in 1989.
- Scottish writer Ali Smith used a portrait of Vougiouklaki (from the picture Klotsoskoufi by Dinos Dimopoulos, 1960) in her book Artful about four lectures given at Oxford University by the writer.

== Filmography ==
=== Cinema ===
Year	Film	Role	Notes
1954	To Koritsi Me Ta Louloudia or To Pontikaki (The Girl with Flowers or The Little Mouse)	Krinoula (or Pontikaki)	
1955	O Agapitikos Tis Voskopoulas (Lover of the Shepherdess)	Kristallo	
1956	To Koritsi Me Ta Paramithia (The Girl with the Fairy Tales)	Agni	
1957	Maria Pentagiotissa	Maria Pentagiotissa	
1957	Diakopes Stin Aegina (Holidays in Aegina)	Aliki	
1957	Charoumeni Alites (Happy Tramps)	Annoula	
1957	Erotas Stous Ammolofous (Love in the Sand Dunes)	Anna	
1957	I Zavoliara (The Cheater)	Lenio	
1958	Erotikes Istories (Love Stories)	Maritsa	Vertebrate movie with 3 parts. Vougiouklaki starred at the 3rd part, «The Sunday Rendez-Vous».
1958	O Mimikos Ke I Mary (Mimikos and Mary)	Mary Weber	
1958	I Mousitsa (The Jade)	Aliki	
1958	Astero	Astero	
1959	To Ksilo Vgike Ap' Ton Paradiso (The Beating Come Out From Paradise – Int'l title: Maiden's Cheek)	Liza Papastavrou	Best Retrospective Movies Award at 1st Thessaloniki International Film Festival – The vinyl that contained 2 songs from the film, the «Echo Ena Mistiko» (I have a secret) and «To Gkrizo Gati» (The gray kitten); both music composition by Manos Hadjidakis, was the 1st Gold Disk ever awarded in Greek discography history.
1960	To Klotsoskoufi (The Kicked Skull-Cap)	Mary Georganta	
1960	Madalena	Madalena	Best Actress in a Leading Role Award at 1st Thessaloniki International Film Festival
1961	I Liza Ke I Alli (Liza and the Other Woman)	Liza Fragoudi/Mitsi Gavriiloglou	
1961	I Aliki Sto Nautiko (Aliki in the Navy; international title: Alice in the Navy)	Aliki	
1962	Taxidi (The Trip)	Marina	
1963	I Pseftra (The Liar)	Mary Delipetrou	
1963	Aliki	Aliki	Her first and only English-speaking film, opposite costars Wilfrid Hyde-White and Jess Conrad. Rudolph Maté was the director.
1963	Chtipokardia Sto Thranio (Heartbeats at Desk)	Liza Petrovasili	
1963	Siralardaki Heyecanlar (During the Thrills)		Turkish version of «Chtipokardia Sto Thranio»
1964	I Soferina (The Woman Chauffeur)	Mary Diamantidou	
1964	To Doloma (The Bait)	Keti	
1964	O Paras Ke O Foukaras (The Lucre and the Wretch)	Cameo as herself	
1965	Monterna Stahtopouta (Modern Cinderella)	Katerina Pieri	
1966	I Kori Mou I Sosialistria (My Daughter the Socialist)	Liza Delvi «Sotiris»	
1966	Diplopenies (international title: Dancing The Syrtaki)	Marina	
1967	To Pio Lampro Asteri (The Brightest Star)	Katerina	
1967	Ah Afti I Gineka Mou (Ah My Wife)	Nina	
1968	To Koritsi Tou Louna Park (The Girl from the Amusement Park)	Margarita	
1968	I Arhontissa Ke O Alitis (Lady and the Tramp)	Rena Katsarou – Pipis	
1968	I Agapi Mas (Our Love)	Marina Razelou	
1969	I Neraida Ke To Palikari (The Fairy and the Young Man)	Katerinio Fourtounaki	
1969	I Daskala Me Ta Ksantha Mallia (The Teacher with the Blonde Hair)	Mirto Theodorou Karatasou	
1970	Ena Asteio Koritsi (A Funny Girl)	Christina	Her son Giannis, appears as an infant laughing in the Circus during her performance.
1970	Ipolochagos Natassa (Lieutenant Natassa)	Natassa Armeni	
1971	S' Agapo (I Love You)	Angela	
1971	I Kori Tou Iliou (The Daughter of the Sun)	Maya Vali	
1972	I Aliki Diktator (Aliki Dictator)	Aliki	
1972	I Maria Tis Siopis (Mary of the Silence)	Maria Gerali	
1980	Poniro Thiliko, Katergara Gineka (Cunning Female, Trickster Woman)	Elena Ntavari	
1981	Kataskopos Nelly (Nelly the Spy)	Nelly	

=== Television ===
Year	Title	Role	Episodes	Channel	Notes
1975	Vasilissa Amalia (Queen Amalia)	Queen Amalia	68	EIRT	Based on a fictional love story between Amalia of Oldenburg, former Queen of Greece and spouse of King Otto and Dimitrios Kallergis.
1977	I Theatrina (Actress)	Julia	33	ERT	Based on W. Somerset Maugham's and Guy Bolton's novel Theatre.
1991	Ke Efthimi Ke Hira (Merry and a Widow)	Anna Radek	15	ΑΝΤ1	Based on Franz Lehár's operetta, The Merry Widow.
1993	O Hiros, I Hira Ke Ta Hirotera (The Widower, the Widow and The Worst)	Helena Halkou – Magie – Herself	1 (22nd)	ΑΝΤ1	
1993	Deka Mikroi Mitsi (Ten Little «Mitsi»)	An arrested woman	1 (20th)	MEGA	
1995	Enan Elliniko (A Greek Coffee)	Cameo (as herself)	1 (1st)	ΑΝΤ1	
