= Stavros Xenidis =

Greek actor

Stavros Xenidis Σταύρος Ξενίδης
- Born: 1924; Istanbul, Turkey
- Died: November 2, 2008 (aged 83–84); Athens, Greece
- Occupation: actor

Stavros Xenidis (Greek: Σταύρος Ξενίδης; 1924 – 2 November 2008) was a Greek actor. He was married to actress Margarita Lambrinou.

== Biography ==
Stavros Xenidis was born in Turkey. He studied acting in Karolos Koun's Theatro Technis and made his theatre début in 1944. His theatre career was closely associated with Kostas Moussouris' theatrical company during the 1950s and the 1960s . As a film actor, he took part in more than 70 movies, mostly in secondary roles; his first film role was in "The Song of Pain" (1953) (Greek title: "Το Τραγούδι του Πόνου") and his last was in "Red White" (1993) ("Άσπρο Κόκκινο").

He also appeared in several TV shows since 1971; His last appearance on television was in 1994.

He died in a retirement home in Athens on 2 November 2008, after suffering a number of strokes.

== Selected filmography ==
=== Cinema ===
Year	Film title (English translation)	Original title and transliteration	Role
1954	I oraia ton Athinon	Η ωραία των Αθηνών	Mr. Tsilimirdis
1957	Barba Giannis, o kanatas	Μπάρμπα Γιάννης ο κανατάς	Platon Venetis
1958	An Italian in Greece	Μια ιταλίδα στην ελλάδα Mia italida stin Ellada	Giorgos
1959	The Policeman of the 16th Precinct	Ο Ηλίας του 16ου O Ilias tou 16ou	Vangelis
1960	To Klotsoskoufi	Το κλωτσοσκούφι	Stavros Ntanakoulis
1960	Christina	Χριστίνα	a mouse in the hotel
1960	To koroidaki tis despoinidos	Το κοροϊδάκι της δεσποινίδος	Manolis
1965	I gyni na fovitai ton andra	Η γυνή να φοβήται τον άνδρα	Haralabos
1965	Moderna stahtopouta	Μοντέρνα σταχτοπούτα Modern Cinderella?	Menios Haralabidis
1966	I vouleftina	Η βουλευτίνα	Periklis Arapis
1967	Patera katse fronima	Πατέρα κάτσε φρόνημα Father, Stay Calm	Lazaros
1967	The Shiniest Star	Το πιο λαμπρο αστέρι	Lazaros
1968	O Romios echei filotimo	Ο Ρωμιός έχει φιλότιμο	Stamatis
1969	Aphrodite's Island	Το νησί της Αφροδίτης; To nissi tis Afroditis	George MacLean
1970	I yennei tou vorra	Οι γενναίοι του βορρά	Colonel
1971	Agapissa mia polythrona	Αγάπησα μια πολυθρόνα	psychiatrist
1971	I efoplistina	Η εφοπλιστίνα	Yerakis
1971	I krevvatomourmoura	Η κρεββατομουρμούρα	Menios Pournaros
1971	Mado Mavrogenous	Μαντώ Μαυρογένους	Ioanis Kolettis
1971	Manolios in Europe	Ο Μανωλιός στην Ευρώπη; O Manolios stin Evropi	Apostolos
1972	Erotiki symfonia	Ερωτική συμφωνία	Thanos
1972	Seven Years of Marriage	Εφτά χρόνια γάμου Efta chronia gamou	Filippas
1973	Enas trellos, trellos aeropeiratis	Ένας τρελός - τρελός αεροπειρατής enas trelos - trelos aeropeiratis	Michel Sarantidis
1980	Eleftherios Venizelos	Ελευθέριος Βενιζέλος	Emmanouil Repoulis
1984	Loufa kai parallagi	Λούφα και παραλλαγή	Col. Kodelis/Kondelis

=== Television ===
Year	Film title (English translation)	Original title and transliteration	Role	Broadcaster
around 1970 and 1975	Beka	αστυνόμου Μπέκα	an officer	ERT
1990	Aris Bonsalentis's Secret	Μυστικό του Άρη Μπονσαλέντη	Police Inspector Bekas	Mega
1991-1992	O episkeptis tis omihlis	Ο επισκέπτης της ομίχλης	Spyros Avdoulidis	Mega
1992	Mia gynaika apo to parelthon	Μια γυναίκα από το παρελθόν	Police Inspector Bekas	ANT1
