= Marika Krevata =

Greek actress (1910–1994)

- Born: 12 June 1910; Athens, Greece
- Died: 14 September 1994 (aged 84); Athens, Greece
- Occupation: Actress

Marika Krevata (Greek: Μαρίκα Κρεβατά; 12 June 1910 – 14 September 1994) was a Greek actress of theatre and film.

== Biography ==
Marika Krevata was the daughter of Stamatis Krevatas (musician) and his wife, Sofia. She was born in Athens in 1910. When she was a child, her father and younger sister, Thaleia, both died. She first appeared in theatre at an early age. In the beginning she toured Greece with children's acts including Daskalitsa (Δασκαλίτσα). She later appeared in operettas by Georgios Xydis. She also spent time with Manos Filippidis's theatre company.

== Personal life ==
Her first husband was Angelos Mavropoulos; the couple had one child, Gelly. She married, secondly, to Giorgos Gavriilidis (died in 1982).

She retired in 1972, and died on 14 September 1994, aged 84, at the Athens Clinic. In the last years of her life, she suffered from dementia. She is interred in Kokkinos Milos Cemetery.

== Filmography ==
| Year | Film | Transliteration and translation | Role |
|---|---|---|---|
| 1957 | Delistratou kai yios | Δελησταύρου και υιός | Amalia Mavrogianni |
| 1959 | Stournara 288 | Στουρνάρα 288 | Kleio Assymomyti |
| 1959 | Liza, Be Quiet | Η Λίζα το 'σκασε (I Liza to 'skase) | Mrs. Kollarou-Papadea |
| 1959 | The Policeman of the 16th Precinct | Ο Ηλίας του 16ου (O Ilias tou 16ou) | Loukia |
| 1960 | To klotsoskoufi | Το κλωτσοσκούφι | Theodora Vengkeli-Angelidou |
| 1961 | Haramofaides | Χαραμοφάηδες | Magda Skarmoutsou |
| 1962 | Otan leipei i gata | Όταν λείπει η γάτα | Mrs. Zemberi |
| 1962 | Eteria thavmaton | Εταιρεία θαυμάτων | Danai |
| 1963 | Polytehnitis ke erimospitis | Πολυτεχνίτης και ερημοσπίτης | Maria's employer |
| 1963 | One Jerk With A Patent | Ένας βλάκας με πατέντα (Enas vlakas me patenta) | - |
| 1964 | Three Girls From America | Τρία κορίτσια από το Αμέρικα (Tria koritsia apo tin Americ(k)a) | - |
| 1964 | Kosmos kai kosmakis | Κόσμος και κοσμάκης | Garoufalia Karteli |
| 1964 | Another For a Millions | Άλλος για το εκατομμύριο (Allos gia to ekatomyrio) | Matina |
| 1965 | Yie mou, yie mou | Υιέ μου, υιέ μου | Amalia Mavrogianni |
| 1965 | Vana | Βάνα | - |
| 1965 | Mia gynaika horis dropi | Μια γυναίκα χωρίς ντροπή (A Woman Without Shame) | - |
| 1965 | The Poor Millionaire | Ο φτωχός εκατομμυριούχος (O ftohos ekatommyriouhos) | - |
| 1965 | Exileosi | Εξιλέωση | - |
| 1966 | All The Men Are the Same | Όλοι οι άνδρες είναι ίδιοι (Oloi i andres ine idii) | Georgiadou |
| 1966 | My Woman Has Gone Mad | Η γυναίκα μου τρελλάθηκε (I yinaika mou trellathike) | Elli |
| 1966 | O adelfos mou o trelaras | Ο αδελφός μου ο τρελάρας | Farnezi |
| 1967 | O modistros | Ο μόδιστρος | Erasmia |
| 1967 | O anakatosouras | Ο ανακατωσούρας | Theoni |
| 1968 | O petheropliktos | Ο πεθερόπληκτος | Olympia |
| 1969 | Wake Up, Liar | Ξύπνα, κορόιδο (Xypna, koroido) | Ismini |
| 1969 | The Tale | Ο παραμυθάς (O paramythas) | Veatriki Karagiorgi |
| 1969 | The Countess of the Fabrics | Η κόμισσα της φάμπρικας (I komissa tis fabrikas) | Dimitra Delimani |
| 1969 | Enas magkas sta salonia | Ένας μάγκας στα σαλόνια | Eva Nikolaou |
| 1970 | The Dry-Head | Ο ξεροκέφαλος (O xerokefalos) | aunt Amalia |
| 1970 | O paichnidiaris | Ο παιχνιδιάρης (The Player) | Marianthi |
| 1970 | O apithanos | Ο απίθανος | Olympia Karali |
| 1970 | O akypiros htypithike | Ο ακτύπητος χτυπήθηκε | Antigoni Papamarkou |
| 1971 | Vacations in Vietnam | Διακοπές στο Βιετνάμ (Diakopes sto Vietnam) | Evlampia |
| 1971 | The Prince of the Market | Ο πρίγκιπας της αγοράς (O prigkipas tis agoras) | Georgette |
| 1972 | Pos katantisame, Sotiri | Πώς καταντήσαμε, Σωτήρη | Andromahi |
| 1973 | A Crazy, Crazy Hijacker | Ένας τρελός, τρελός αεροπειρατής (Enas trelos, terlos aeropeiratis) | Loukia Sgourou |
