= Orestis Makris =

Greek actor and singer

- Born: 30 September 1898; Chalcis, Greece
- Died: 29 January 1975 (aged 76); Athens, Greece
- Occupations: Actor, tenor

Orestis Makris (Greek: Ορέστης Μακρής; 30 September 1898 – 29 January 1975) was a Greek actor and tenor.

== Biography ==
Makris graduated from the Athens Conservatoire and first entered the scene as a tenor in the troupe of Rosalia Nika in 1925. He later joined the Papaioannou troupe, before moving to more comedic roles. Makris excelled in the portrayal of folk characters, especially the stock role of the "drunkard". Makris also participated in about forty movies, mostly as an over-strict father. He is considered one of the most significant modern Greek actors.

He was decorated with the Order of the Phoenix. He died on 29 January 1975 in Athens and is buried at the First Cemetery in a family grave.

== Filmography ==
Year	Film	Transliteration and translation	Role
1932	O magos tis Athinas	Ο μάγος της Αθήνας	–
1950	O methystakas	Ο μεθύστακας	Charalambos
1952	O groussouzis	Ο γρουσούζης	Agathoklis
1954	To koritsi tis geitonias (The Girl of the Neighborhood)	Το κορίτσι της γειτονιάς	Stamos
1955	I kalpiki lira	Η κάλπικη λίρα	Vassilis Mavridis
1955	Katadikasmeni ki ap' to paidi tis	Καταδικασμένη κι απ' το παιδί της	Pavlos
1955	To fintanaki	Το φιντανάκι	Antonis
1956	I arpagi tis Persefonis	Η αρπαγή της Πεσεφόνης	President of Katochori
1957	I theia ap' to Chicago	Η θεία απ' το Σικάγο	Charilaos Bardas
1957	Tis nychtas ta kamomata	Της νύχτας τα καμώματα	Sotiris
1957	To amaxaki	Το αμαξάκι	Anestis
1958	Mia laterna, mia zoi	Μια λατέρνα, μια ζωή	Kosmas
1958	I kyra mas i mami	Η κυρά μας η μαμή	Lykourgos
1959	O Thymios ta' kane thalassa	Ο Θύμιος τα 'κανε θάλασσα	Vrasidas Moralis
1960	Stournara 288	Στουρνάρα 288	Babis
1960	I Chionati ki ta 7 gerontopalikara	Η Χιονάτη και τα 7 γεροντοπαλίκαρα	Kaisar Alexandrou
1961	Exo oi kleftes	Έξω οι κλέφτες	Timoleon Adamantas
1961	Oikogeneia Papadopoulou (Papadopoulos Family)	Οικογένεια Παπαδοπούλου; Oikogeneia Papadopoulou	Nikos Karydoglou
1963	To merokamato tou ponou	Το μεροκάματο του πόνου	Vangelis
1964	O Aristeidis kai ta koritsia tou	Ο Αριστείδης και τα κορίτσια του	Aristeidis Delaportas
1964	Adikimeni	Αδικημένη	Nikolas Andreou
1964	Zitianos mias agapis	Ζητιάνος μιας αγάπης	Spyros
1964	Kathe kaimos kai dakry	Κάθε καημός και δάκρυ	–
1964	Ponesa poly gia sena	Πόνεσα πολύ για σένα	Haridimos
1965	Me pono kai me dakrya	Με πόνο και με δάκρυα	Vassilis Kapsomichalos
1965	Oi katafronemenoi	Οι καταφρονεμένοι	Stamatis
1968	Ena koritsi alliotiko ap' t' alla	Ένα κορίτσι αλλιώτικο απ' τ' άλλα	–

== On stage ==
Title	Transliteration and translation
Let's Go to Cyprus	Πάμε για την Κύπρο; Pame gia ton Kypro
Black and White and a Zero	Άσπρο μαύρο και ζερό Aspro mavro kai zero
Women and Flowers	Γυναίκες και λουλούδια Gynaikes kai louloudia
