= Vasilis Avlonitis =

Greek comedian (1904–1970)

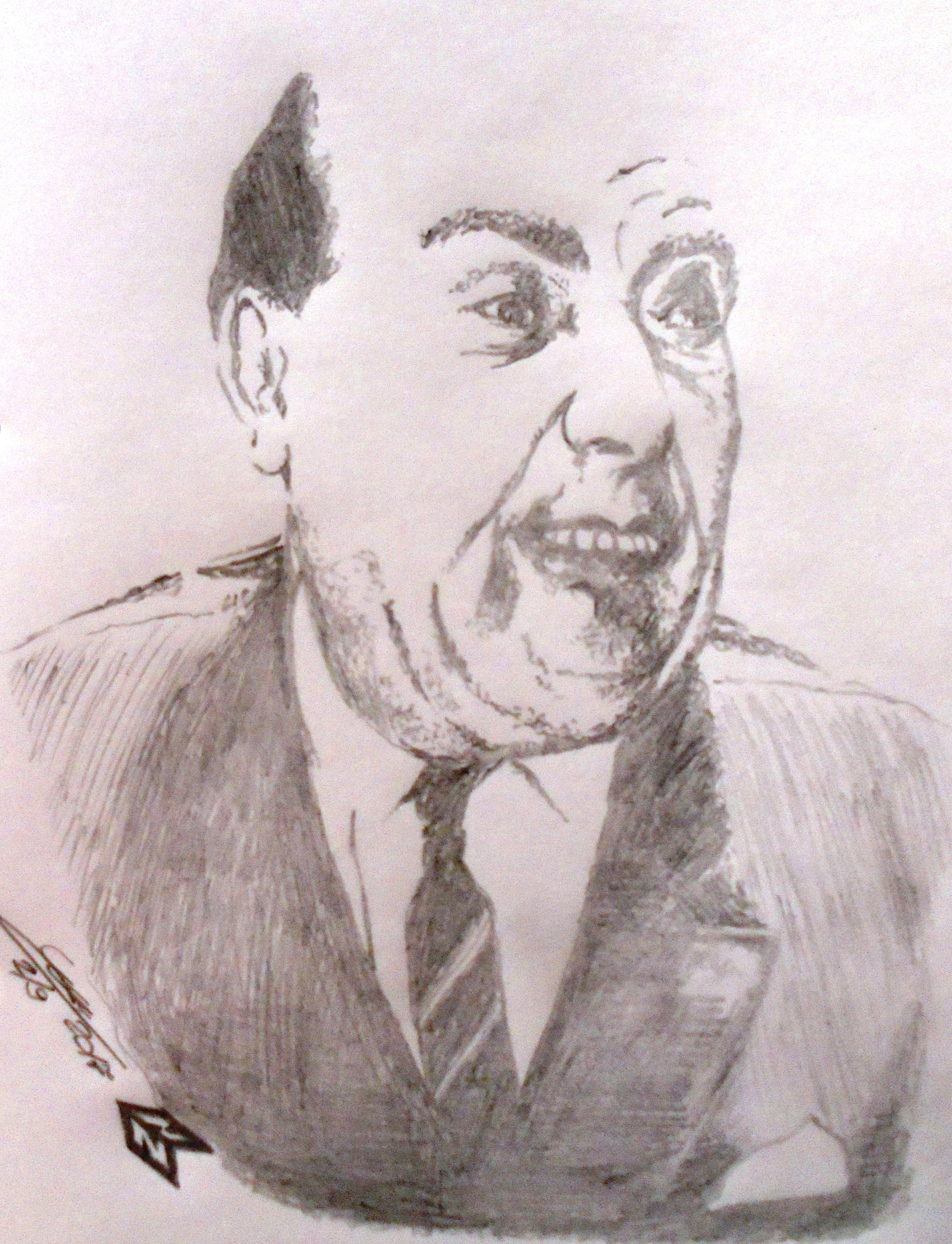
- Portrait of Vasilis Avlonitis
- Born: 1 January 1904; Thiseio, Athens, Greece
- Died: 10 March 1970 (aged 66); Athens, Greece
- Resting place: Second Cemetery of Athens
- Occupation: Actor
- Years active: 1924–1970
- Spouse: Yoyo
- Children: 2

Vasilis Avlonitis (Greek: Βασίλης Αυλωνίτης; 1 January 1904 – 10 March 1970) was one of the most famous old-school Greek comedians. He performed in numerous films and stage productions in the mid to late 20th century.

Vasilis Avlonitis is best known for his collaboration in films with Georgia Vasiliadou; he usually played her husband, brother or neighbour. Together they would make audiences laugh, since he portrayed the fat guy and she would be the ugly funny lady having problems with him. They would get calm at the end of the film, by resolving their arguments and/or marrying each other.

Avlonitis has also portrayed demanding drama roles, such as the leading character in the film Tis nyhtas ta kamomata.

== Filmography ==
- Limani ton dakryon (Λιμάνι των Δακρυών) 1929
- Dipli thysia 1945
- Allos, O 1952
- Haroumeno xekinima 1954
- Oraia ton Athinon, I 1954 .... Zahos Markas
- Laterna, ftoheia kai filotimo 1955 .... Pavlaras
- Glenti – lefta ki agapi 1955 .... Lavrentis
- Kafetzou, I 1956 .... Nikitas
- Tis nyhtas ta kamomata 1957 .... policeman
- Laterna, ftoheia kai garyfallo 1957 .... Pavlaras
- Kata lathos babas 1957
- Ehei theio to koritsi 1957 .... Jimis
- Barba Giannis, o kanatas 1957 .... Barba Giannis
- Amaxaki, To 1957
- Tzitzikas ki o mermigas, O 1958 .... Loulis
- Makrya ap' ton kosmo 1958 .... Isidoros
- Leftas, O 1958 .... Theodosis Mentikas
- Eispraktoraki, To 1958
- 4 nyfes ki enas gabros 1958 .... Prokopis
- Mia zoi tin ehoume 1958 .... warden
- Sarakatsanissa 1959
- Thisavros tou makariti, O 1959 .... Neokosmos
- Kyria dimarhos, I 1960 .... Anargyros Prokopis
- Kalimera Athina 1960 .... Menelaos Stasinopoulos
- Agrimi, To 1960 .... Stasinopoulos
- Agapoula mou 1960
- Hionati kai ta 7 gerontopallikara, I 1960 .... Efstathios
- Mana mou, ton agapisa 1961
- Klearhos, I Marina kai o kontos, O 1961 .... Klearhos Zougalas
- Exypno pouli, To 1961 .... Mihos
- Terma ta difraga 1962 .... Agisilaos
- Pezodromio 1962
- Otan leipi i gata! 1962 .... Loukas
- Mihalios tou 14ou Syntagmatos, O 1962 .... Col. Karadimos
- Koroido gabre 1962 .... Diamantis Sarantopoulos
- Karpouzaki, To 1962
- Gabros gia klamata 1962
- Gabroi tis Eftyhias, Oi 1962 .... Vagelis Tarnianis
- Exypnoi kai koroida... 1962 .... Pelopidas
- Ellinida kai o erotas, I 1962
- Triti kai 13 1963 .... man at the races
- Thymios sti hora tou strip-tiz, O 1963
- Tempeloskylo, To 1963 .... Alexandros Pelekanos
- Pseftothodoros 1963 .... Thodoros
- Mikroi kai megaloi en drasei 1963 .... Faidon
- Lenio, i voskopoula 1963 .... Hronis
- Enas vlakas... me patenta!
- Anipsios mou, o Manolis, O 1963 .... Aristidis
- Agapisa kai ponesa 1963
- Tria koritsia ap' tin Amerika 1964 .... Nikos Nikolaidis
- Soferina, I 1964 .... Gylos
- Proikothires 1964 .... Prokopis
- Pikri mou, agapi 1964
- Paras kai o foukaras, O 1964 .... Mr. Panagakos
- Mia 'vdomada ston paradeiso 1964
- Lagopodaros, O 1964
- Itan oloi tous... koroida! 1964 .... Giangos
- Giannis takane thalassa, O 1964 .... Kostas
- Allos... gia to ekatommyrio! 1964 .... Babis
- Kai oi... 14 itan yperohoi! 1965
- Ena exypno exypno... moutro 1965 .... Potis
- Dyskoloi dromoi 1965
- Dyhtia tis dropis, Ta 1965
- Sklavoi tis moiras 1966
- Poniros praktor Karagiozis 1966 .... Barba-Giorgos
- Meletis stin Ameso Drasi, O 1966 .... Isaias Kontomakris
- Fifis, o aktypitos 1966 .... Panagos
- Isaia, horeve 1966 .... Isaias Kontomakris
- Eho dikaioma na s' agapo! 1966 .... Timoleon Bakatsolas
- Diplopennies 1966 .... Vangelis
- Babas mou, o teddyboys, O 1966 .... Dodos Varlentis
- Adelfi mou thelei xylo, I 1966
- Siko, horepse syrtaki 1967 .... Prokopis
- Tosa oneira stous dromous 1968
- Petheropliktos, O 1968 .... Theofrastos Karatourlekis
- Koroida, i valitsa mou ki ego..., Ta 1969 .... Stelakis
- Kathe katergaris ston pago tou 1969 .... Kyriakoulis
- Fovatai o Giannis to therio... 1969 .... Thodoris
- Arhontissa tou limaniou, I 1969
- Aristokratissa kai o alitis, I 1969 .... Stratos
