= Alekos Sakellarios =

Greek writer and director

- Αλέκος Σακελλάριος
- Born: 13 November 1913; Athens, Greece
- Died: 28 August 1991 (aged 77); Athens, Greece
- Occupations: Film director, screenwriter, lyricist

Alekos Sakellarios (Greek: Αλέκος Σακελλάριος; 13 November 1913 in Athens – 28 August 1991 in Athens) was a Greek writer and a director.

== Biography ==
He was born in Athens and grew up in Agios Panteleimonas and began to study journalism and acting at a young age. He wrote his first theatrical play in 1935 called The King of Halva. He entered the film industry and had roles in both screenwriting and directing.He married 3 times and had 2 kids

He directed mainly with Christos Giannakopoulos and together they wrote and produced an estimated 140 works. The most popular include: The Germans Strike Again, Thanassakis o politevomenos, I theia ap' to Chicago, Dikoi mas Anthropoi, Ena votsalo sti limni, Kalos ilthe to dollario, Ta kitrina gantia, Otan Leipei i Gata, I Soferina, Laterna, Ftocheia kai Filotimo, Alimono stous Neous (Woe to the Young) and more. Many of these theatrical plays were transferred to the cinema with notable success.

He also wrote the lyrics of many songs (over 2,000). Among them were the successes: Garifallo st' Afti, Ypomoni, Asta ta Malakia sou (sung by Fotis Polymeris), Eho ena Mystiko and more.

The significant journalist Fredy Germanos called him the "most clever Greek of the 20th century".

He died in 1991 and is buried in the First Cemetery of Athens in a family grave.
