= Cinema of Greece =

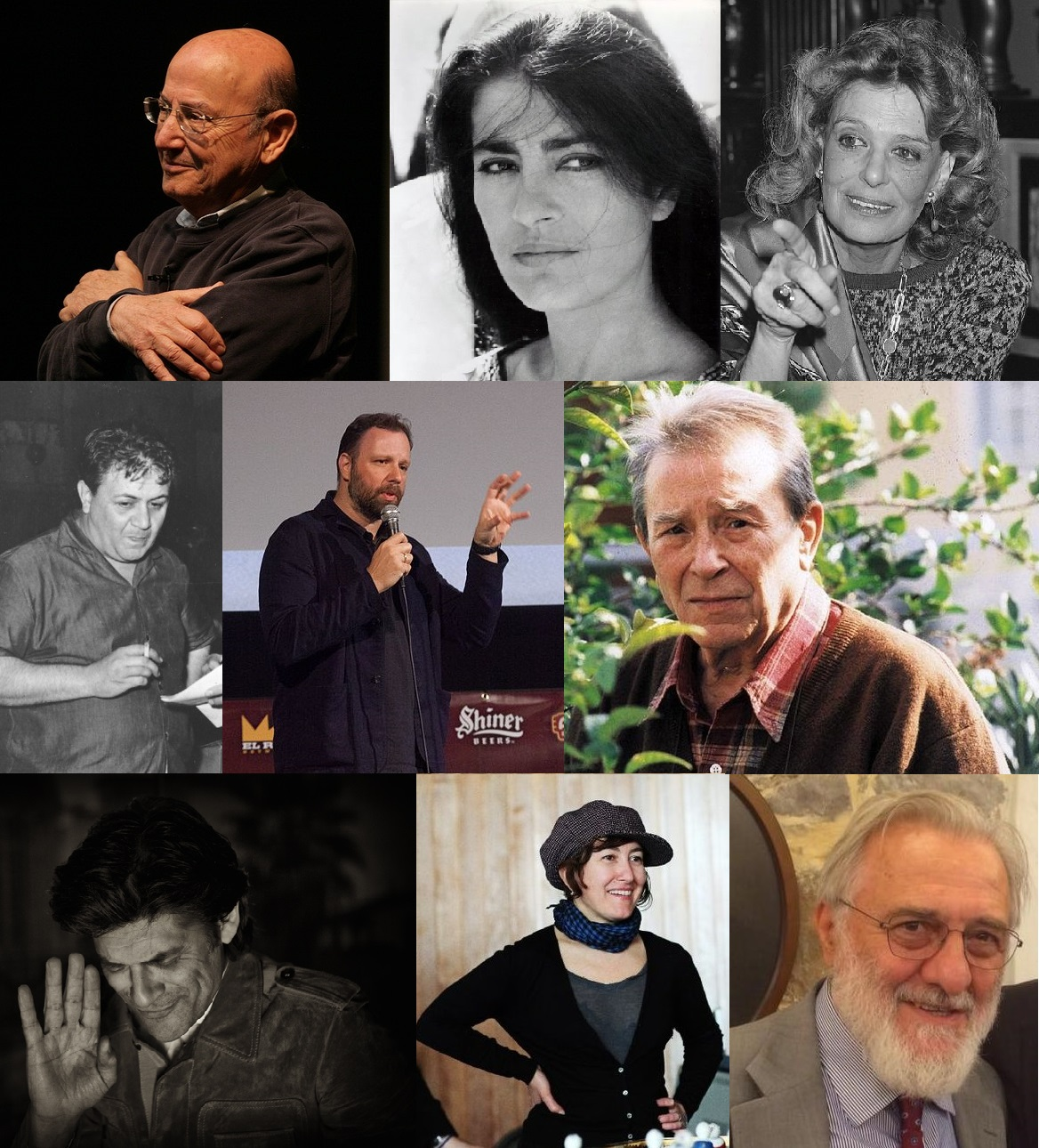
- Collage with figures of the Greek cinema
- No. of screens: 370 (2010)
  - Per capita: 3.7 per 100,000 (2010)

Produced feature films (2010)
- Fictional: 16
- Animated: -
- Documentary: 2

Number of admissions (2011)
- Total: 11,900,000
  - Per capita: 0.9 (2012)

Gross box office (2011)
- Total: $130 million

The cinema of Greece has a long and rich history. Though hampered at times by war or political instability, the Greek film industry dominates the domestic market and has experienced international success. Characteristics of Greek cinema include a dynamic plot, strong character development and erotic themes. Two Greek films, Missing (1982) and Eternity and a Day (1998), have won the Palme d'Or at the Cannes Film Festival. Five Greek films have received nominations for the Academy Award for Best Foreign Language Film.

Though Greek cinema took root in the early 1900s, the first mature films weren't produced until the 1920s, after the end of the Greco-Turkish War. Films during this period, such as Astero (1929) by Dimitris Gaziadis and Maria Pentagiotissa (1929) by Ahilleas Madras, consisted of emotional melodramas with an abundance of folkloristic elements. Orestis Laskos's Daphnis and Chloe (1931), one of the first Greek films to be shown abroad, contained one of the first voyeuristic nude scenes in a European film. During the Axis occupation, the Greek film industry struggled as it was forced to relocate overseas.

Following the Greek Civil War, Greek cinema experienced a revival. Inspired by Italian neorealism, directors such as Grigoris Grigoriou and Stelios Tatasopoulos created works during this period shot on location using non-professional actors. During the 1950s and 1960s, Greek cinema experienced a golden age, starting with Michael Cacoyannis's Stella (1955), which was screened at Cannes. The 1960 film Never on Sunday was nominated for five Academy Awards, and its lead actress, Melina Mercouri, won the Best Actress Award at Cannes. Cacoyannis's Zorba the Greek (1964) won three Academy Awards. Other films released in this era, such as The Counterfeit Coin and The Ogre of Athens are nowadays considered some of the greatest works of Greek cinema.

Censorship policies of the 1967 junta and rising foreign competition led to a decline in Greek cinema. After the restoration of democracy in the mid-1970s, the Greek film industry again flourished, led by director Theo Angelopoulos, whose films captured international recognition, making him probably the most acclaimed Greek director to date. Other acclaimed directors of this era include Nikos Nikolaidis, as well as Pantelis Voulgaris and Alexis Damianos, the director of the landmark film Evdokia. However, this drift toward art-house cinema in the 1980s led to a decline in audiences. In the 1990s, younger Greek filmmakers began experimenting with iconographic motifs. In spite of, or because of, funding issues created by the financial crisis in the late 2000s, unique Greek films such as Yorgos Lanthimos's Dogtooth (2009), Panos H. Koutras' Strella (2009) and Athina Rachel Tsangari's Attenberg (2010) received international acclaim, constituting what has been called the "Greek Weird Wave".

== History of the Greek cinema ==
=== Origins ===
In the spring of 1897, the Greeks of Athens watched the first cinematic ventures (short movies in "journal"). In 1906 Greek cinema was born when the Manakis brothers started recording in Macedonia, and the French filmmaker "Leons" produced the first "Newscast" from the midi-Olympic games of Athens (the unofficial Olympic games of 1906).

The first cine-theater of Athens opened about a year later and other special 'projection rooms' begun their activity. In 1910-11 the first short comic movies were produced by director Spiros Dimitrakopoulos (Spyridion), who also starred in most of his movies. In 1911 Kostas Bachatoris presented Golfo (Γκόλφω), a well known traditional love story, considered the first Greek feature film. In 1912 was founded the first film company (Athina Film) and in 1916 the Asty Film.

During the First World War, production was limited to documentaries and newscasts only. Directors like George Prokopiou and Dimitris Gaziadis are distinguished for filming scenes from the battlefield and later, during the Greco-Turkish War, of the efforts of the Hellenic Army and finally the Great Fire of Smyrna (1922).

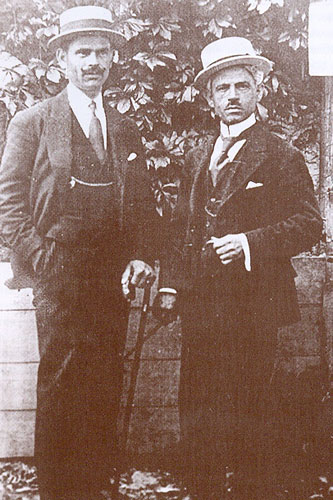
Manakis brothers, pioneers of the cinema in the Balkans

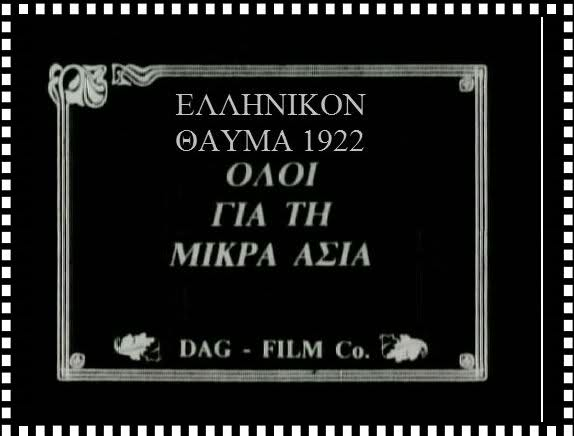
Snapshot from a Greek short clip during the Greco-Turkish war by Dag Films, 1922

The first commercially successful Greek film was Villar in the Women's Baths of Faliro (Ο Βιλλάρ στα γυναικεία λουτρά του Φαλήρου), written, directed by and starring comedian Villar (Nikolaos Sfakianakis) and Nitsa Philosofou. In 1924, Michael Michael (1895–1944), a Greek comedian, presented some short film comedies.

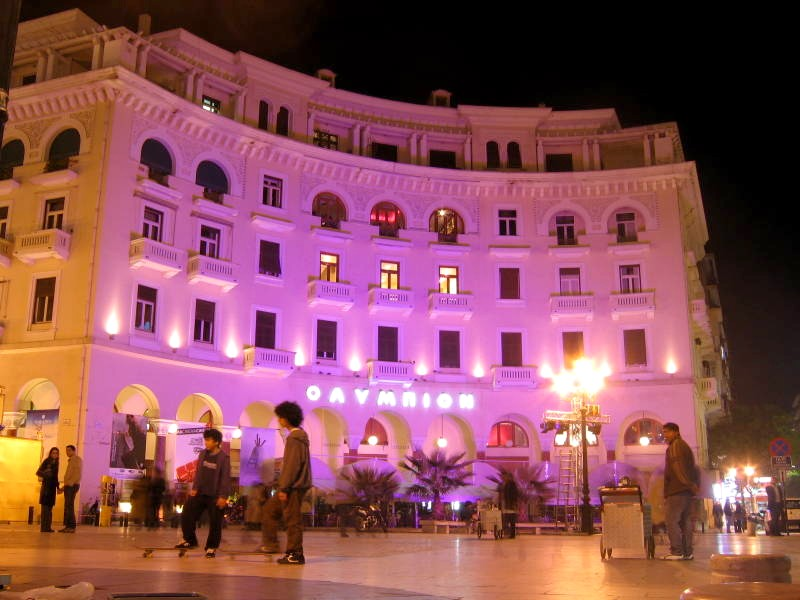
Olympion Theatre, seat of the Thessaloniki International Film Festival

In 1922, Gaziadis founded Dag Films and tried to produce the first speaking movies. This company presented its first movie, Love and Waves (Έρως και κύματα), in 1927, and experienced moderate success in the late 1920s and early 1930s. The company mainly produced historical movies, usually adaptations of novels. In 1930, Dag made an attempt for a speaking movie, The Apaches of Athens (Οι Απάχηδες των Αθηνών), which was based on a Greek operetta by Nikos Hatziapostolou.

Gaziadis also filmed the 1927 Delphic Festival, an idea of Angelos Sikelianos and Eva Palmer-Sikelianos, as part of his general effort towards the revival of the "Delphic Idea". The event consisted of Olympic contests, an exhibition of folk art, and a performance of Prometheus Bound.

The 1931 film Daphnis and Chloe (Δάφνις και Χλόη), directed by Orestis Laskos (1908–1992), contained one of the first voyeuristic nude scenes in European cinema; it was also the first Greek movie which was played abroad. In 1932 Olympia Films presented the speaking movie The Shepherdess's Lover (Ο αγαπητικός της βοσκοπούλας), which was based on a play by Dimitris Koromilas. Also influential during this period was director Achilleas Madras, whose work included Maria Pentagiotissa (1929) and Sorcerer of Athens (1931).

During the late 1930s, a number of Greek filmmakers fled Greece due to the hostility of Metaxas Regime and the material lack of ability for producing speaking movies. The Greek film industry reemerged in Turkey, and later in Egypt.

In spite of German occupation during World War II, Philopemen Finos, a film producer who was active in the Greek Resistance, founded Finos Films (1942), which would later become one of the most commercially successful Greek studios. One of Finos's earliest productions, Voice of the Heart (Η φωνή της καρδιάς) (1943, directed by Dimitris Ioannopoulos), drew large audiences, to the consternation of the Germans. Another important film during this period, Applause (Χειροκροτήματα) (1944, directed by George Tzavellas), which presented a thinly-disguised biography of one of Greece's most important popular songwriters of the era, Attik, was produced by Finos's rival, Novak Films.

In 1944, Katina Paxinou was honoured with the Academy Award for Best Supporting Actress for her role as "Pilar" in the Sam Wood film, For Whom the Bell Tolls.

=== The Golden Age (modern period) ===
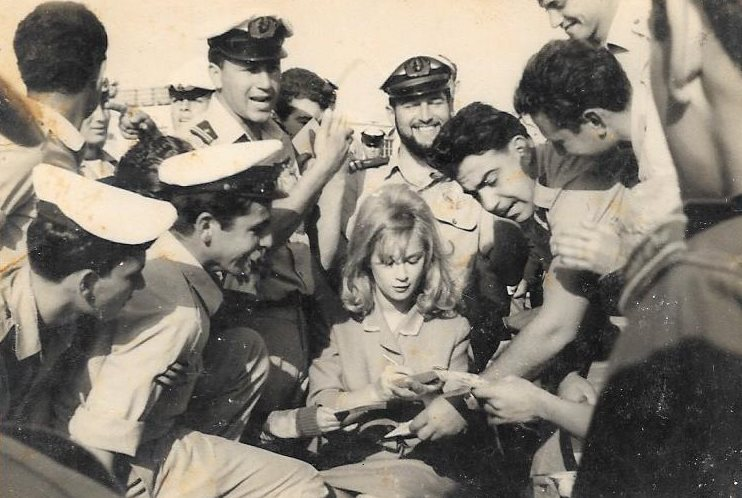
Aliki Vougiouklaki in Israel, 1964

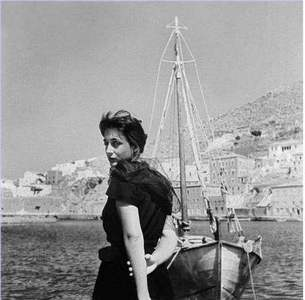
Ellie Lambeti

The 1950s and 1960s are considered by many to be the "Golden Age" of Greek cinema. Directors and actors of this era were recognized as important historical figures in Greece and some gained international acclaim: Michael Cacoyannis, Alekos Sakellarios, Melina Mercouri, Nikos Tsiforos, Iakovos Kambanelis, Katina Paxinou, Nikos Koundouros, Ellie Lambeti, and Irene Papas. More than sixty films per year were made, with the majority having film noir elements. Notable films were The Counterfeit Coin (Η κάλπικη λίρα, 1955 directed by George Tzavellas), Bitter Bread (Πικρό Ψωμί, 1951, directed by Grigoris Grigoriou), and The Ogre of Athens (Δράκος, 1956, directed by Nikos Koundouros).

Finos Film and director Alekos Sakellarios collaborated on several films in the late 1950s, namely The Hurdy-Gurdy (Φτώχεια και Φιλότιμο, 1955) and its sequel, Laterna, ftoheia kai garyfallo (Λατέρνα, 1958), as well as Aunt from Chicago (Η Θεία από το Σικάγο, 1957) and Maiden's Cheek (Το ξύλο βγήκε από τον Παράδεισο, 1959).

The 1955 film Stella, directed by Michael Cacoyannis and written by Iakovos Kambanelis, was screened at Cannes, and launched Greek cinema into its "golden age." Melina Mercouri, who starred in the film, met American expatriate director Jules Dassin at Cannes while attending the screening, and the two would eventually marry. Dassin directed the 1960 Greek film, Never on Sunday, which starred Mercouri. The film was nominated for several Academy Awards, including Best Actress for Mercouri, and won the Academy Award for Best Song for composer Manos Hatzidakis' title track. The couple also collaborated on the 1967 musical stage adaptation, Illya Darling, for which Mercouri received a Tony Award nomination. She went on to star in such films as Topkapi and Phaedra, both directed by Dassin, and the 1969 American comedy, Gaily, Gaily.

Cacoyannis' 1964 film, Zorba the Greek, which starred Anthony Quinn, was a major commercial success, and was nominated for the Academy Awards for Best Director, Best Adapted Screenplay and Best Film. The movie was based on the novel, Zorba the Greek, by author Nikos Kazantzakis. Other important films during this period include Antigone (1961) and Electra (1962), both of which starred Irene Papas, The Red Lanterns (1963) by director Vasilis Georgiadis, and Battlefield Constantinople (1970), which starred the "Greek Brigitte Bardot," Aliki Vougiouklaki.

The Thessaloniki International Film Festival was first held in 1960, and would subsequently evolve into the primary showcase for emerging filmmakers from Greece and the Balkans region. The festival showcases both international and Greek films, and awards the "Golden Alexander" for the best feature film.

In 1969, the Costa-Gavras film Z was nominated for the Academy Award for both Best Foreign Language Film and Best Picture.

=== Postmodern period ===
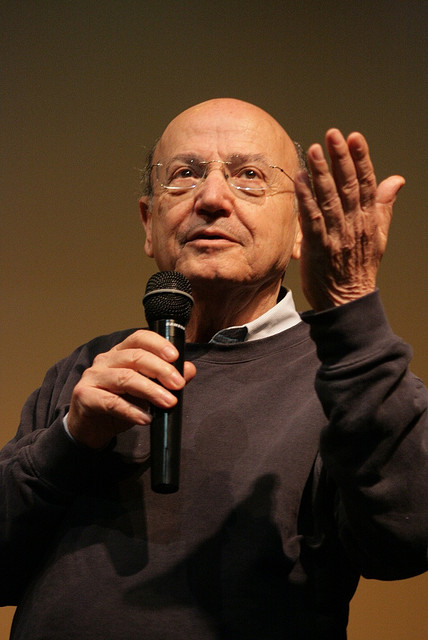
Theodoros Angelopoulos, winner of the Palme d'Or in 1998

The production of Greek films increased after the fall of the dictatorship in the mid-1970s, though the industry struggled with foreign competition and the rise of television. Michael Cacoyannis' 1977 film, Iphigenia, was nominated for an Oscar for Best Foreign Language Film. During the 1970s and 1980s Theo Angelopoulos directed a series of critically acclaimed movies, among them The Travelling Players (1975), The Hunters (1977), and Voyage to Cythera (1984). His film Eternity and a Day won the Palme d'Or and the Prize of the Ecumenical Jury at the 1998 Cannes Film Festival. Costa-Gavras's film Missing won the Palme d'Or at 1982 Cannes Film Festival. Director Costas Ferris's 1983 film, Rembetiko, won the Silver Bear at the Berlin International Film Festival.

When the left-leaning Panhellenic Socialist Movement was elected to power in 1981, actress Melina Mercouri, a member of the party, was appointed Minister for Culture. In this role, she obtained government support for the Greek film industry, and set up networks to promote Greek cinema abroad. The increase in government funding led to a predominance of slow-moving, cerebral art-house films, which lacked mass appeal.

Beginning in the 1990s, younger directors turned to more contemporary-paced films and social satires, which brought moderate commercial success. In 1999, TV series writers Michalis Reppas and Thanasis Papathanasiou, collaborating with contemporary famous actors made the sex taboo comedy Safe Sex, which was the most successful movie of the decade.

In 2003, A Touch of Spice (Politiki kouzina), a big-budget film by director Tasos Boulmetis, was the most successful film of the year at the Greek box office, making over 12 million euros. 2004 was also a good year for Greek films, with Pantelis Voulgaris's Brides (Nyfes) gathering more than a million spectators and over 7 million at the box office. In 2007 the most successful film was El Greco, directed by Yannis Smaragdis.

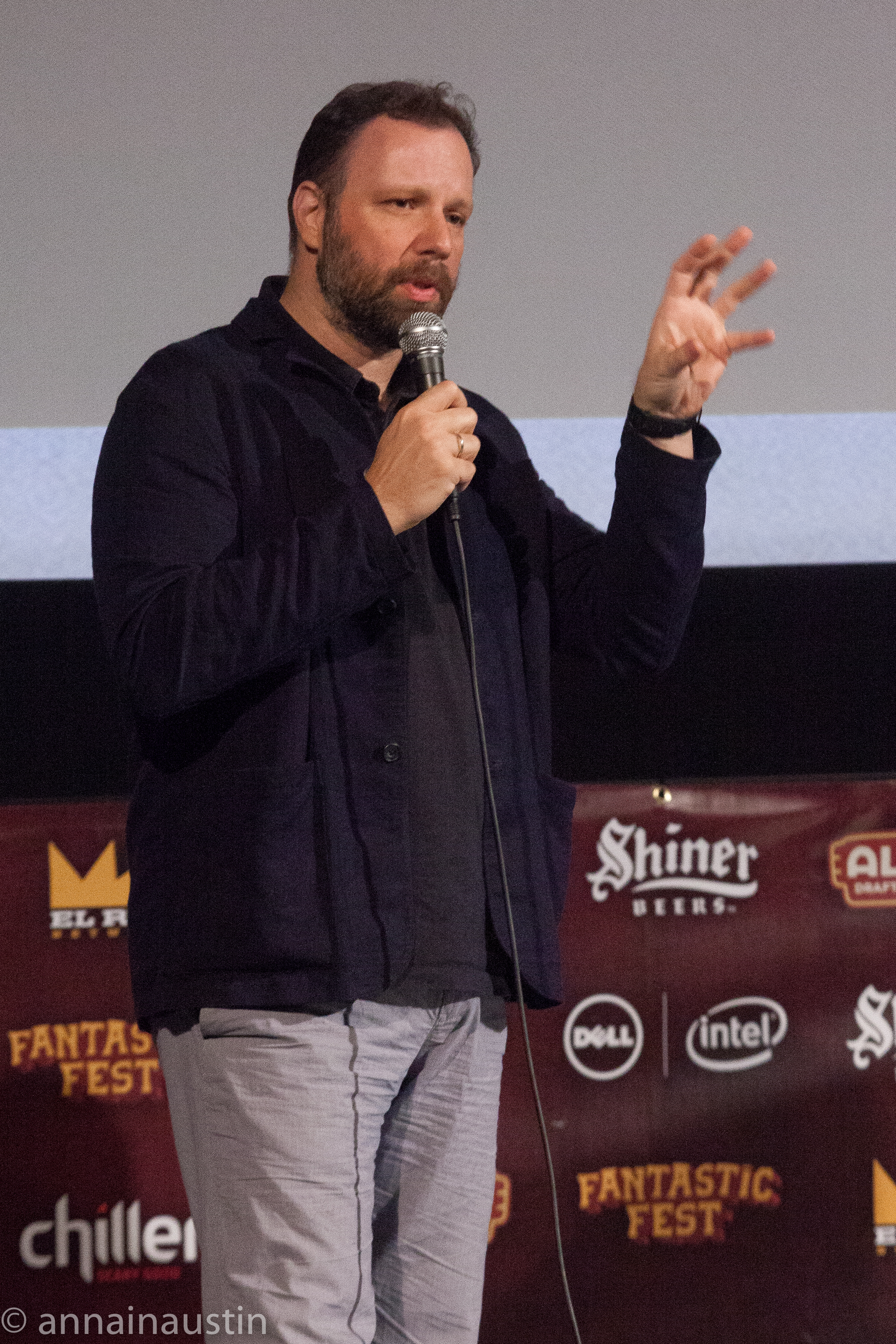
Yorgos Lanthimos

In 2009, Dogtooth, directed by Yorgos Lanthimos, won the Prix Un Certain Regard at the Cannes Film Festival, and in 2011 was nominated for Best Foreign Language Film at the 83rd Academy Awards. The 2010 film Attenberg, directed by Athina Rachel Tsangari, won the Coppa Volpi Award for Best Actress (Ariane Labed) at the Venice Film Festival. Also, at the same festival that year, Homeland, directed by Syllas Tzoumerkas screened at the International Critics' Week, Plato's Academy by Filippos Tsitos screened at a special event in Venice Days, and Casus Belli, a short film by director Yorgos Zois, screened at the Orizzonti section, prompting Nick Vivarelli of Variety to write about "the country's biggest showing in decades". In 2011 Alps won the Osella Award for Best Screenplay (Yorgos Lanthimos and Efthimiοs Filippou) at the 68th Venice Film Festival. Dogtooth, Attenberg and Alps are part of what some film critics, including Steve Rose of The Guardian, have termed the "Greek Weird Wave," which involves movies with haunting cinematography, alienated protagonists and absurdist dialogue. Other films mentioned as part of this "wave" include Panos H. Koutras's Strella (2009) and Yannis Economides's Knifer (2010). In 2011, the 46th Karlovy Vary International Film Festival presented a tribute to Young Greek Cinema with seven feature films: Attenberg, Dogtooth, Homeland, Strella, Tale 52 (directed by Alexis Alexiou) and Wasted Youth (directed by Argyris Papadimitropoulos and Jan Vogel).

The "wave" of Greek cinema continued its course through the decade, producing several titles that were festival and critical sensations and were distributed in many countries. Many tributes to this generation of Greek filmmakers were held by festivals worldwide, most notably by the New Horizons Film Festival in Wrocław, Poland, and the Jeonju International Film Festival in Korea. Recent studies called the Greek Weird Wave, a cinema "that reflects on how systems of power manage groups of people (from a family to a population) and the bodies of individuals", and "a cinema equally sensitive to forms of response, to noise, unease, and subversion".

In 2011, just twenty feature-films were produced. Wasted Youth, directed by Argyris Papadimitropoulos and Jan Vogel was the opening film of the 40th Rotterdam International Film Festival, Alps, directed by Yorgos Lanthimos won the Best Screenplay Award at the Venice International Film Festival and Unfair World, directed by Filippos Tsitos won the Best Actor Award for Antonis Kafetzopoulos at the San Sebastian International Film Festival.

In 2012, L by Babis Makridis premiered in competition at the Rotterdam International Film Festival, and Boy Eating the Bird's Food, directed by Ektoras Lygizos, premiered in competition at the Karlovy Vary International Film Festival, winning a Special Mention for actor Yannis Papadopoulos.

In 2013, Miss Violence, directed by Alexandros Avranas won Silver Lion for best director at the 70th Venice International Film Festival. Peter Bradshaw of The Guardian, compared the film to the previously mentioned, saying that "It (self-evidently) does not have the humour of those movies by Yorgos Lanthimos and Athina Rachel Tsangari and by that token, less of their richness and inventiveness. But its force can't be doubted."

In 2014, Stratos, directed by Yannis Economidis premiered in competition at the Berlin International Film Festival, Xenia, directed by Panos H. Koutras, premiered at the Un Certain Régard section of the Cannes Film Festival, and A Blast, directed by Syllas Tzoumerkas, premiered in competition at the Locarno International Film Festival.

In 2015, Wednesday 04:45 by Alexis Alexiou premiered in competition at the Tribeca Film Festival, Chevalier, directed by Athina Rachel Tsangari premiered in competition at the Locarno International Film Festival and won the Best Film Award at the BFI - London International Film Festival, and Interruption by Yorgos Zois premiered at the Orizzonti competition section of the Venice International Film Festival.

In 2016, Suntan by Argyris Papadimitropoulos premiered at the Rotterdam and SXSW International Film Festivals and won the Best Film Award at the Edinburgh International Film Festival.

In 2017, Son of Sofia, directed by Elina Psykou won the Best International Narrative Feature Award at the Tribeca Film Festival.

In 2018, Pity, directed by Babis Makridis, premiered in competition at the Sundance and the Rotterdam International Film Festivals.

in 2021, Jacqueline Lentzou's Moon, 66 Questions premiered at the Encounters competition section of the 71st Berlin International Film Festival.

== Notable films ==
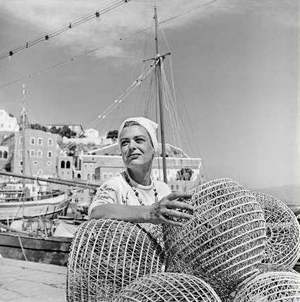
Melina Mercouri in Phaedra (1962)

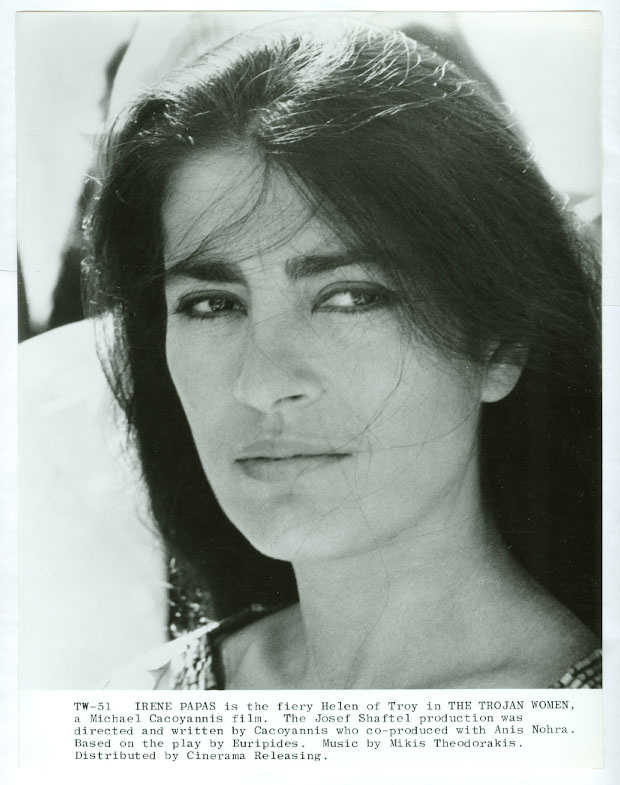
Irene Papas in The Trojan Women (1971)

Pre-WWII

- 1914 Golfo, Konstantinos Bachatoris (the first Greek feature film)
- 1927 Eros kai kymata, Dimitris Gaziadis
- 1930 Oi Apachides ton Athinon, Dimitris Gaziadis
- 1931 Daphnis and Chloe, Orestis Laskos
- 1932 Shepherdess's Lover, Dimitris Tsakiris (first speaking)
- 1939 The Parting Song by Filopimin Finos
- 1944 Chirokrotimata, George Tzavellas

After-WWII (Golden Age)

- 1948 The Germans are Coming Again, Alekos Sakellarios, starring Vassilis Logothetidis
- 1950 The Drunkard, George Tzavellas, starring Orestis Makris
- 1951 Pikro Psomi, Grigoris Grigoriou
- 1954 Despoinis eton 39, Alekos Sakellarios
- 1954 Kiriakatiko Xipnima, Cacoyannis
- 1955 Stella, Michael Cacoyannis, starring Melina Mercouri
- 1955 The Counterfeit Coin, George Tzavellas
- 1956 Thanassakis o politevomenos, Alekos Sakellarios
- 1956 Aces of the Stadiums, Vasilis Georgiadis
- 1956 O Drakos, Nikos Koundouros, starring Dinos Iliopoulos
- 1956 A Girl in Black, Michael Cacoyannis, starring Ellie Lambeti
- 1956 The Girl from Corfu, Yiannis Petropoulakis, starring Rena Vlachopoulou (the first colour film)
- 1957 I theia ap' to Chicago, Alekos Sakellarios, starring Georgia Vasileiadou
- 1958 A Hero in His Slippers, Alekos Sakellarios, starring Vassilis Logothetidis
- 1959 Astero, Dinos Dimopoulos
- 1959 Stournara 288, Dinos Dimopoulos
- 1959 Elias of the 16th, Alekos Sakellarios, starring Costas Hajihristos
- 1960 Madalena, Dinos Dimopoulos, starring Aliki Vougiouklaki
- 1960 Never on Sunday, Jules Dassin
- 1960 Egklima sta paraskinia, Dinos Katsouridis
- 1961 Antigone, George Tzavellas
- 1961 Alice in the Navy, Alekos Sakellarios
- 1961 Woe to the Young, Alekos Sakellarios, starring Dimitris Horn
- 1962 Nomos 4000, Giannis Dalianidis
- 1962 Electra, Michael Cacoyannis
- 1962 Glory Sky, Takis Kanellopoulos
- 1963 Young Aphrodites, Nikos Koundouros
- 1963 The Red Lanterns, Vasilis Georgiadis
- 1964 Zorba the Greek, Michael Cacoyannis, starring Anthony Quinn
- 1965 And the Wife Shall Revere Her Husband, George Tzavellas
- 1966 Blood on the Land, Vasilis Georgiadis
- 1967 Oi kyries tis avlis, Dinos Dimopoulos
- 1968 Girls in the Sun, Vasilis Georgiadis
- 1970 Ipolochagos Natassa, Nikos Foskolos (tickets record)
- 1971 What did you do in the war, Thanasi?, Dinos Katsouridis, starring Thanasis Veggos
- 1971 Evdokia, Alexis Damianos
- 1971 The Trojan Women, Michael Cacoyannis
- 1972 The Countess of Corfu, starring Rena Vlachopoulou
- 1972 Days of '36, Theo Angelopoulos
- 1975 The Travelling Players, Theo Angelopoulos
- 1977 Iphigenia, Michael Cacoyannis
- 1977 To vary... peponi, Pavlos Tassios

Modern

- 1980 Parangelia!, Pavlos Tassios
- 1981 Learn How to Read and Write, Son, Thodoros Maragos
- 1983 Rembetiko, Costas Ferris
- 1984 Loafing and Camouflage, Nikos Perakis
- 1984 Voyage to Cythera, Theo Angelopoulos
- 1985 Stone Years, Pantelis Voulgaris
- 1986 The Beekeeper, Theo Angelopoulos, starring Marcello Mastroianni
- 1987 Doxobus, Fotos Lambrinos
- 1988 Landscape in the Mist, Theo Angelopoulos
- 1991 The Suspended Step of the Stork, Theo Angelopoulos, starring Marcello Mastroianni
- 1995 Ulysses' Gaze, Theo Angelopoulos
- 1998 Eternity and a Day, Theo Angelopoulos
- 1998 Safe Sex, Reppas-Papathanasiou
- 1999 Peppermint, Kostas Kapakas
- 2003 A Touch of Spice, Tasos Boulmetis, starring Georges Corraface
- 2004 Brides, Pantelis Voulgaris
- 2007 El Greco, Yannis Smaragdis
- 2007 Tale 57, Alexis Alexiou
- 2009 Dogtooth, Yorgos Lanthimos
- 2009 Strella, Panos H. Koutras
- 2010 Attenberg, Athina Rachel Tsangari
- 2010 Homeland, Syllas Tzoumerkas
- 2011 Unfair World, Filippos Tsitos
- 2011 Alps, Yorgos Lanthimos
- 2011 Wasted Youth, Argyris Papadimitropoulos and Jan Vogel
- 2012 L, Babis Makridis
- 2012 Boy Eating the Bird's Food, Ektoras Lygizos
- 2013 Little England, Pantelis Voulgaris
- 2013 Miss Violence, Alexandros Avranas
- 2014 Stratos, Yannis Economidis
- 2014 Xenia, Panos H. Koutras
- 2014 A Blast, Syllas Tzoumerkas
- 2015 Ouzeri Tsitsanis, Manousos Manousakis
- 2015 Chevalier, Athina Rachel Tsangari
- 2015 Interruption, Yorgos Zois
- 2015 Wednesday 04:45, Alexis Alexiou
- 2016 Suntan, Argyris Papadimitropoulos
- 2017 Son of Sofia, Elina Psykou
- 2018 Pity, Babis Makridis
- 2019 Eftychia, Angelos Frantzis
- 2019 The Miracle of the Sargasso Sea, Syllas Tzoumerkas
- 2021 Moon, 66 Questions, Jacqueline Lentzou
- 2021 Monday, Argyris Papadimitropoulos

== Notable musicals ==
- 1963 Merikoi to protimoun kryo (Some Like it Cold), Giannis Dalianidis
- 1964 Something Is Burning, Dalianidis
- 1965 Kiss the Girls, Giannis Dalianidis
- 1967 Oi Thalassies oi Hadres, Giannis Dalianidis
- 1968 Gorgones kai Mages, Dalianidis

== Filming, distribution companies and studios ==
=== Past ===
- Athina Film
- Asty Films
- Dag Films
- Astra Film
- Hero Films (Greek: Ἡρώ)
- Olympia Films
- Anzervos
- Spentzos Films
- Klak Film

=== Current ===
- Finos Films (operates its own studios), founded by the major figure of Philopemen Finos
- Karagiannis Karatzopoulos
- Novak Films (operates own studios)
- Madbox Entertainment (operates its own studios)
- Village Films Hellas (Greek branch of Village Roadshow)
- Haos Film, founded by Athina Rachel Tsangari
- Heretic (production company and sales agent)
- Neda Films (production company)
- Blonde (production company)
- Homemade Films (production company)
- Cinegram
- Odeon Hellas
- Make a Movie in Greece/Media Productions
- Audiovisual (biggest distributor)
- Karamanos Studios (biggest studios in Greece)
- The new studios of Nu Boyana Film Studios (Nu Image) will open inside 2020 in the area of Thessaloniki

=== Producers ===
- Philopemen Finos
- Prodromos Meravidis

== Renowned figures ==
=== Directors ===
- Alexis Alexiou
- Theo Angelopoulos
- Michael Cacoyannis
- George Pan Cosmatos
- Giannis Dalianidis
- Alexis Damianos
- Dinos Dimopoulos
- Costas Ferris
- Nikos Foskolos
- Costa Gavras
- Vasilis Georgiadis
- Constantine Giannaris
- Grigoris Grigoriou
- Takis Kanellopoulos
- Dinos Katsouridis
- Kostas Karagiannis
- Panos H. Koutras
- Nikos Koundouros
- Yorgos Lanthimos
- Orestis Laskos
- Tonia Marketaki
- Kostas Manoussakis
- Thodoros Maragos
- Nico Mastorakis
- Prodromos Meravidis
- Nikos Nikolaidis
- Nikos Perakis
- Vassilis Photopoulos
- Maria Plyta
- Alekos Sakellarios
- Yannis Smaragdis
- Spiros Stathoulopoulos
- Stelios Tatasopoulos
- Athina Rachel Tsangari
- Giorgos Tzavellas
- Syllas Tzoumerkas
- Thanasis Veggos
- Takis Vougiouklakis
- Pantelis Voulgaris

=== Screenwriters ===
- Efthymis Filippou
- Iakovos Kambanelis
- Thanos Leivaditis
- Petros Markaris
- Dimitris Psathas
- Alekos Sakellarios
- Mimis Traiforos
- Nikos Tsiforos

=== Actors ===
- Alekos Alexandrakis
- Cybele Andrianou
- Beata Asimakopoulou
- Vasilis Avlonitis
- Andreas Barkoulis
- Georges Corraface
- Vasilis Diamantopoulos
- Lavrentis Dianellos
- Chronis Exarhakos
- Spiros Focás
- Mimis Fotopoulos
- Giorgos Fountas
- Petros Fyssoun
- Giorgos Gavriilidis
- Katerina Gogou
- Costas Hajihristos
- Dimitris Horn
- Dinos Iliopoulos
- Antonis Kafetzopoulos
- Xenia Kalogeropoulou
- Kostas Karras
- Martha Karagianni
- Tzeni Karezi
- Manos Katrakis
- Tasso Kavadia
- Kostas Kazakos
- Lambros Konstantaras
- Giorgos Konstantinou
- Maro Kontou
- Marika Kotopouli
- Nikos Kourkoulos
- Marika Krevata
- Ellie Lambeti
- Zoe Laskari
- Ilya Livykou
- Vassilis Logothetidis
- Orestis Makris
- Melina Mercouri
- Alexis Minotis
- Vangelis Mourikis
- Sotiris Moustakas
- Elena Nathanael
- Christoforos Nezer
- Marika Nezer
- Sapfo Notara
- Makis Papadimitriou
- Dimitris Papamichael
- Irene Papas
- Dionyssis Papayannopoulos
- Angeliki Papoulia
- Stavros Paravas
- Daphne Patakia
- Katina Paxinou
- Vangelis Protopapas
- Nikos Rizos
- Yvonne Sanson
- Georges Sari
- Nikos Stavridis
- Smaro Stefanidou
- Stefanos Stratigos
- Anna Synodinou
- Christos Tsaganeas
- Nitsa Tsaganea
- Vasilis Tsivilikas
- Nora Valsami
- Titos Vandis
- Aimilios Veakis
- Thanasis Veggos
- Georgia Vasileiadou
- Sofia Vembo
- Rena Vlahopoulou
- Giannis Voglis
- Aliki Vougiouklaki
- Kostas Voutsas
- Sperantza Vrana
- Eleni Zafeiriou
- Pantelis Zervos

=== Directors of photography ===
- Giorgos Arvanitis

=== Scenographers ===
- Vassilis Photopoulos
- Yannis Tsarouchis

=== Film score composers ===
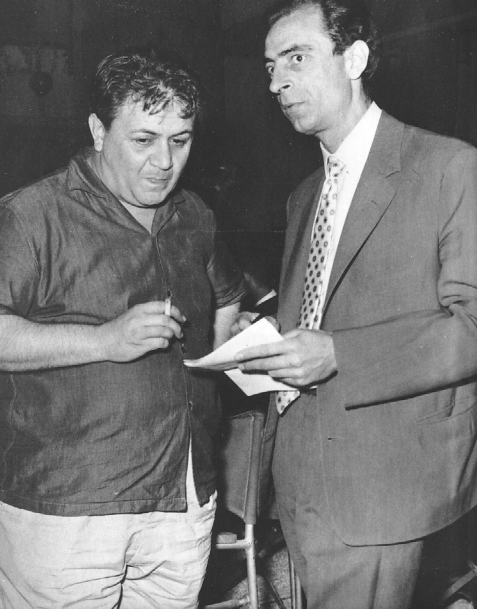
Manos Hatzidakis

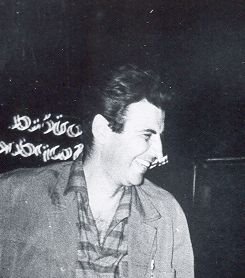
Mikis Theodorakis

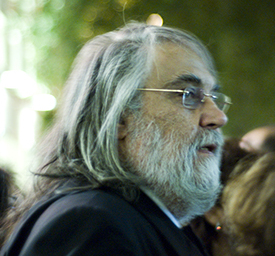
Vangelis Papathanassiou

- Kostas Giannidis
- Manos Hatzidakis (notable: Stella, Never on Sunday, Woe to the Young, Htipokardia sto thranio)
- Kostas Kapnisis
- Eleni Karaindrou (notable: Eternity and a Day)
- Giorgos Katsaros
- Loukianos Kilaidonis (notable: The Travelling Players)
- Manos Loïzos (notable: Evdokia)
- Yannis Markopoulos
- Giorgos Mouzakis
- Vangelis Papathanassiou (notable: El Greco)
- Mimis Plessas (notable: What Did You Do in the War, Thanasi?)
- Michalis Souyioul
- Stamatis Spanoudakis
- Mikis Theodorakis (notable: Electra, Zorba the Greek, Z, The Trojan Women, Iphigenia)
- Stavros Xarchakos (notable: The Red Lanterns, Rembetiko)
- Giorgos Zambetas

== See also ==
- Greek Film Archive
- Cinema of Cyprus
- Cinema of Europe
- Culture of Greece
- Hellenic Film Academy
- Hellenic Film Academy Awards
- Film School of the Aristotle University
- List of films with Hellenic/Greek characters
- List of Greek actors
- List of Greek films
- List of Greek submissions for the Academy Award for Best Foreign Language Film
- List of Greek award-winning films in International Film Festivals
- List of highest-grossing Greek films
- World cinema

== Bibliography ==
- Dimitris Koliodimos, The Greek filmography, 1914 through 1996 (vols. 1 and 2), Jefferson, NC: McFarland, 1999.
- Journal of Modern Greek Studies 18.1, May 2000, Special Issue: "Greek Film."
- Vrasidas Karalis, A History of Greek Cinema, Continuum, 2012.
