= List of Greek award-winning films in international film festivals =

Many Greek films have represented the Greek cinema in International Film Festivals. Greek films or (Greek co-productive films) have won accolades in the most famous International Film Festival such as Academy Awards, Golden Globe Awards, Cannes Festival, Venice Festival, Berlin Festival, Cyprus International Film Festival and other. Below are considered the awarded Greek films in the most notable international film festival.

== Academy Awards ==
Film	Year	Award	Category	Recipients and nominees	Result
Never on Sunday	1960	33rd Academy Awards	Best Original Song	Manos Hatzidakis	Won
Zorba The Greek	1964	37th Academy Awards	Best Supporting Actress	Lila Kedrova	Won
Zorba The Greek	1964	37th Academy Awards	Best Production Design	Vassilis Photopoulos	Won
Zorba The Greek	1964	37th Academy Awards	Best Cinematography	Walter Lassally	Won

== Golden Globes ==
Film	Year	Award	Category	Recipients and nominees	Result
Stella	1955	13th Golden Globe Awards	Best Foreign Language Film	Michael Cacoyannis	Won
A Girl in Black	1956	14th Golden Globe Awards	Best Foreign Language Film	Michael Cacoyannis	Won

== Cannes International Film Festival ==
List of awards
Film	Year	Award	Category	Recipients and nominees	Result
Never on Sunday	1960	1960 Cannes Film Festival	Best Actress Award	Melina Mercouri	Won
Voyage to Cythera	1984	1984 Cannes Film Festival	Best Screenplay Award	Theo Angelopoulos	Won
Ulysses' Gaze	1995	1995 Cannes Film Festival	Grand Jury Prize	Theo Angelopoulos	Won
Eternity and a Day	1998	1998 Cannes Film Festival	Palme d'Or	Theo Angelopoulos	Won
Eternity and a Day	1998	1998 Cannes Film Festival	Prize of the Ecumenical Jury	Theo Angelopoulos	Won
Dogtooth	2009	2009 Cannes Film Festival	Prix Un Certain Regard	Yorgos Lanthimos	Won
The Lobster	2015	2015 Cannes Film Festival	Jury Prize	Yorgos Lanthimos	Won

== Berlin International Film Festival ==
List of awards
Film	Year	Award	Category	Recipients and nominees	Result
Young Aphrodites	1963	13th Berlin International Film Festival	Silver Bear for Best Director	Nikos Koundouros	Won
Rebetiko	1984	34th Berlin International Film Festival	Silver Bear	Costas Ferris	Won

== Venice International Film Festival ==
List of awards
Film	Year	Award	Category	Recipients and nominees	Result
Landscape in the Mist	1988	45th Venice International Film Festival	Silver Lion	Theo Angelopoulos	Won
Attenberg	2010	67th Venice International Film Festival	Volpi Cup	Ariane Labed	Won
Alps	2011	68th Venice International Film Festival	Golden Osella	Yorgos Lanthimos	Won
Miss Violence	2013	70th Venice International Film Festival	Silver Lion	Alexandros Avranas	Won
Miss Violence	2013	70th Venice International Film Festival	Volpi Cup	Themis Panou	Won

== Moscow International Film Festival ==
List of awards
Film	Year	Award	Category	Recipients and nominees	Result
The Descent of the Nine	1984	14th Moscow International Film Festival	Golden Prize	Christos Siopahas	Won

== Shanghai International Film Festival ==
List of awards
Film	Year	Award	Category	Recipients and nominees	Result
Little England	2013	2014 Shanghai International Film Festival	Best Feature Film	Pantelis Voulgaris	Won
Little England	2013	2014 Shanghai International Film Festival	Best Director	Pantelis Voulgaris	Won
Little England	2013	2014 Shanghai International Film Festival	Best Actress	Pinelopi Tsilika	Won

== Locarno International Film Festival ==
List of awards
Film	Year	Award	Category	Recipients and nominees	Result
The Idlers of the Fertile Valley	1978	1978 Locarno International Film Festival	Golden Leopard	Nikos Panayotopoulos	Won
Hard Goodbyes: My Father	2002	2002 Locarno International Film Festival	Best Actor	Giorgos Karayannis	Won

== European Film Awards ==
List of awards
Film	Year	Award	Category	Recipients and nominees	Result
Landscape in the Mist	1988	2nd European Film Awards	Best Film	Theo Angelopoulos	Won
The Lobster	2015	28th European Film Awards	Best Screenwriter	Yorgos Lanthimos, Efthimis Filippou	Won
The Lobster	2015	28th European Film Awards	Best Costume Designer	Sarah Blenkinsop	Won

== San Sebastian International Film Festival ==
List of awards
Film	Year	Award	Category	Recipients and nominees	Result
Unfair World	2012	2012 San Sebastián Film Festival	Silver Shell	Filippos Tsitos	Won
Unfair World	2012	2012 San Sebastián Film Festival	Best Actor	Antonis Kafetzopoulos	Won

== Cairo International Film Festival ==
List of awards
Film	Year	Award	Category	Recipients and nominees	Result
Vasiliki	1997	1998 Cairo International Film Festival	Best Actor	Paschalis Tsarouhas	Won
The King	2002	2003 Cairo International Film Festival	Golden Pyramid	Nikos Grammatikos	Won
El Greco	2007	32nd Cairo International Film Festival	Best Actor	Juan Diego Botto	Won
Forever	2014	36th Cairo International Film Festival	Silver Pyramid	Margarita Manta	Won

== Mar del Plata International Film Festival ==
List of awards
Film	Year	Award	Category	Recipients and nominees	Result
Vasiliki	1997	1998 Mar del Plata International Film Festival	Best Actor	Paschalis Tsarouhas	Won

== Chicago International Film Festival ==
List of awards
Film	Year	Award	Category	Recipients and nominees	Result
And the Wife Shall Revere Her Husband	1965	Chicago International Film Festival	Best Director	George Tzavellas	Won
The Hunters	1977	Chicago International Film Festival	Golden Hugo	Theo Angelopoulos	Won

== Goya Awards ==
List of awards
Film	Year	Award	Category	Recipients and nominees	Result
El Greco	2007	23rd Goya Awards	Best Costume Design	Lala Huete	Won

== Fantasporto ==
List of awards
Film	Year	Award	Category	Recipients and nominees	Result
Money, A Mythology of Darkness	1999	Jury's special award	Vassilis Mazomenos	Won	
Vassilis Mazomenos	2001	Career award	Won		

== Maverick Movie Awards ==
List of awards
Film	Year	Award	Category	Recipients and nominees	Result
Lines (film)	2017	Best Director	Vassilis Mazomenos	Won	

== South East European Film Festival ==
List of awards
Film	Year	Award	Category	Recipients and nominees	Result
Lines (film)	2018	Best Director	Vassilis Mazomenos	Won	

== Mumbai Awards ==
List of awards and nominations
Film	Year	Award	Category	Recipients and nominees	Result
Black Field	2009	2010 Mumbai International Film Festival	Silver Gateway Trophy	Vardis Marinakis	Won

*Film won the top prize

== Cyprus International Film Festival ==
List of awards and nominations
Film	Year	Award	Category	Recipients and nominees	Result
Tungsten	2010	2011 Cyprus International Film Festival	Golden Aphrodite Award	Giorgos Georgopoulos	Won

*Film won the top prize

== South East European Film Festival ==
List of awards
Film	Year	Award	Category	Recipients and nominees	Result
Common Denominator (film)	2014	Best Director	Sotiris Tsafoulias	Won	

== See also ==
- List of Greek Academy Award winners and nominees
- List of Greek submissions for the Academy Award for Best Foreign Language Film
