= List of films with Hellenic/Greek characters =

This is a list of films featuring characters identified as Greek or of Greek heritage. The list is divided into English language films and Greek language films, arranged in chronological order by year of release.

== English language films ==
Year	Title	Genre	Director	Character(s)	Actor	Notes	Country
1927	The Show	Silent Drama	Tod Browning	The Greek	Lionel Barrymore	n/a	USA
1938	Crime School	Crime Drama	Lewis Seiler	George "Fats" Papadopoulos, Nick Papadopoulos	Bernard Punsly; Paul Porcasi	n/a	USA
1944	The Mask of Dimitrios	Mystery	Jean Negulesco	Dimitrios Makropoulos	Zachary Scott	n/a	USA
1944	Destination Tokyo	War	Delmer Daves	Leos Theofilos Karafias Jr aka "Tin Can"	Dane Clark	n/a	USA
1951	It's a Big Country	Anthology	Charles Vidor	Icarus Xenophon	Gene Kelly	n/a	USA
1953	Beneath the 12-Mile Reef	Drama	Robert D. Webb	Tony Petrakis	Robert Wagner	n/a	USA
1954	Ulysses	Drama	Mario Camerini; Mario Bava	Ulysses	Kirk Douglas	n/a	Italy, USA, France
1957	Boy on a Dolphin	Romance Adventure	Jean Negulesco	Phaedra	Sophia Loren	n/a	USA
1958	Onionhead	Comedy	Norman Taurog	Stella Papparonis	Felicia Farr	n/a	USA
1960	Never on Sunday	Drama	Jules Dassin	Ilya	Melina Mercouri	n/a	Greece
1960	Spartacus	Epic	Stanley Kubrick	Spartacus	Kirk Douglas	n/a	USA
1960	Oceans 11	Heist	Lewis Milestone	Spyros Acebos	Akim Tamiroff	n/a	USA
1961	The Guns of Navarone	War	J. Lee Thompson	Col Andrea Stavros; Maria Pappadimos	Anthony Quinn; Irene Pappas	n/a	UK, USA
1962	Phaedra	Drama	Jules Dassin	Phaedra; Alexis	Melina Mercouri; Anthony Perkins	n/a	USA, Greece
1963	America America	Drama	Elia Kazan	Various	Various	n/a	USA
1964	Zorba the Greek	Comedy-Drama	Michael Cacoyannis	Alexis Zorba	Anthony Quinn	n/a	USA, Greece
1969	A Dream of Kings	Drama	Daniel Mann	Matsoukas; Caliope	Anthony Quinn; Irene Pappas	n/a	USA
1969	The Arrangement	Drama	Elia Kazan	Evangelos Topouzoglou (aka "Eddie Anderson")	Kirk Douglas	n/a	USA
1969	Z	Drama	Costa-Gavras	Various	Various	n/a	France, Algeria
1978	The Greek Tycoon	Biographical Drama	J. Lee Thompson	Theo Tomasis	Anthony Quinn	n/a	USA
1981	The Postman Always Rings Twice	Drama	Bob Rafelson	Nick Papadakis	John Colicos	n/a	USA
1985	Eleni	Drama	Peter Yates	Eleni Gatzoyiannis; Nicholas Gage	Kate Nelligan; John Malkovich	n/a	USA
1991	Only the Lonely	Comedy	Chris Columbus	Nick Acropolis	Anthony Quinn	n/a	USA
1998	Lock, Stock and Two Smoking Barrels	Heist Comedy	Guy Ritchie	Nick "the Greek"	Stephen Marcus	n/a	UK
1998	The Big Lebowski	Heist Comedy	Coen Brothers	Theodore Donald "Donny" Kerabatsos	Steve Buscemi	n/a	USA
2006	300	War Epic	Zack Snyder	Leonidas	Gerard Butler	n/a	USA
2002	My Big Fat Greek Wedding	Comedy	Joel Zwick	Various	Various	n/a	USA, Canada
2002	Windtalkers	War Epic	John Woo	Corporal Milo "Greek" Pappas	Mark Ruffalo	n/a	USA
2004	Troy	Epic War	Wolfgang Petersen	Achilles; Odysseus; Agamemnon; Menelaus	Brad Pitt; Sean Bean; Brian Cox; Brendan Gleeson	n/a	USA, UK, Malta
2009	My Life in Ruins	Comedy	Donald Petrie	Georgia Ianakopolis	Nia Vardalos	n/a	USA, Greece, Spain
2012	Papadopoulos & Sons	Comedy-Drama	Marcus Markou	Various	Various	n/a	UK
2020	The Taverna	Comedy-Drama	Alkinos Tsilimidos	Various	Vangelis Mourikis	n/a	Australia

== Greek language films ==
Year	Title	Genre	Director	Character(s)	Actor	Notes	Country
1954	The Little Mouse (Το ποντικάκι)		Nikos Tsiforos	Various	Various	n/a	Greece
1960	Murder Backstage (Έγκλημα στα παρασκήνια)		Dinos Katsouridis	Various	Various	n/a	Greece
1961	The Clever Bird (Το έξυπνο πουλί,)		Orestis Laskos	Various	Various	n/a	Greece
1966	The Fear (Ο φόβος)		Kostas Manoussakis	Various	Various	n/a	Greece
1983	Rembetiko		Costas Ferris	Various	Various	n/a	Greece
2001	The Bubble (Η Φούσκα)		Nikos Perakis	Various	Various	n/a	Greece
2004	Brides (Νύφες)		Pantelis Voulgaris	Various	Various	n/a	Greece
2008	Omega (Ωμέγα)		Vasilis Blioumis	Various	Various	n/a	Greece
2009	Dogtooth (Κυνόδοντας)		Yorgos Lanthimos	Various	Various	n/a	Greece
2013	Little England (Μικρά Αγγλία)		Pantelis Voulgaris	Various	Various	n/a	Greece
2013	Miss Violence		Alexandros Avranas	Various	Various	n/a	Greece
2015	Chevalier		Athina Rachel Tsangari	Various	Various	n/a	Greece
2016	The Other Me (Έτερος Εγώ)		Sotiris Tsafoulias	Various	Various	n/a	Greece
2016	Lines (Γραμμές)		Vassilis Mazomenos	Various	Various	n/a	Greece
2017	The Last Note (Το Τελευταίο Σημείωμα)		Pantelis Voulgaris	Various	Various	n/a	Greece
2019	The Miracle of the Sargasso Sea (Το Θαύμα της Θάλασσας των Σαργασσών)		Syllas Tzoumerkas	Various	Various	n/a	Greece
2021	Smyrna my Beloved (Σμύρνη μου αγαπημένη)		Grigoris Karantinakis	Various	Various	n/a	Greece
