= Stella Greka =

Greek singer (1922–2025)

- Στέλλα Γκρέκα
- Born: Styliani Lagada; 1 April 1922; Athens, Greece
- Died: 6 January 2025 (aged 102); Dionysos, Greece
- Citizenship: Greece; United States
- Occupations: Singer; actress
- Years active: 1943–2017
- Spouses: Orestis Laskos (m. 1942; div. 1947) John Avgerinos (m. 1950, died 1987)
- Children: 2

Stella Greka (Greek: Στέλλα Γκρέκα; born Styliani Lagada; 1 April 1922 – 6 January 2025) was a Greek singer and actress.

== Early life ==
Greka was born in Athens, Attica, on 1 April 1922, the youngest of nine children in a poor family. Her birth name was Styliani Lagada (Στυλιανή Λαγκαδά). Her father was born in Plaka, in 1868. He was a set designer and worked with Evangelia Paraskevopoulou, as well as having relationships with other important people, including Pantelis Horn. At home, the family listened to operas and music.

She appeared young on the music scene of the capital, and from the age of 8 the Athenian press had mentioned her. In 1942, she married the poet and director Orestis Laskos, who suggested the name Stella Greka since she did not want to sing as Stella Laskou. She recorded a series of hits by well-known creators, such as "Let's go into the unknown" (Πάμε στο άγνωστο), "Last night" (Χθές το βράδυ), "Turn around" (Γύρισε), "Whatever you lose" (Τί κι αν χάθεις), and "Marina's song" (Το τραγούδι της Μαρίνας).

== Career ==
Laskos convinced her to act in his film Broken Hearts (1945). Originally, Greka was going to star in Giorgios Tzavella's Applause alongside Attik and Dimitris Horn, but her husband wanted her to take part in his own film instead. Then, she acted in the film Forgotten Faces (1946) by Tzavellas, alongside Emilios Veakis, Giorgos Pappas and Lambros Konstandaras. The director, who appeared in one scene of the play as a car driver, denounced his creation as his biggest failure. She continued her film career with only one more film, Marina, where she again took the lead role. The film, written by Alekos Sakellarios and Christos Gianakopoulos and directed by Sakellarios, was a production of Filopimin Finos, a close friend of Greka and her husband, and was screened in March 1947. The film also starred Dimitris Myrat and Lambros Konstantaras. It was a great success due to Sakellarios's direction and the songs performed by Greka.

== Later life and death ==
Greka, who had divorced Laskos, moved to the United States in the fall of 1947, staying with her brother Aggelos in New York City. In 1950, she married the Greek-American John Avgerinos, who was involved in shipbuilding. She devoted herself to her family and left her career behind, therefore her involvement in singing in America was limited.

Greka appeared on Greek television as a guest of producer Giorgos Papastefanou. On 16 December 2013, a concert-tribute to Greka was organized in Athens by singer Michalis Koubios, with the participation of various artists, as well as the 92-year-old Greka herself.

Greka returned to Greece in 1987 and lived in Dionysos. She turned 100 on 1 April 2022.

Greka died from lung cancer complications on 6 January 2025, at the age of 102.

== Filmography ==
- 1945 – Broken Hearts – Louiza Hrysani
- 1946 – Forgotten Faces – Mary (singing voice)
- 1947 – Marina – Marina
