= List of Academy Award winners and nominees from Greece =

This is a list of Greek Academy Award winners and nominees. It details the performances of Greek filmmakers, actors, actresses and films that have either been nominated for or have won an Academy Award.

== Best Picture ==
Academy Award for Best Picture
Year	Name	Film	Status	Milestone / Notes
1963	Elia Kazan	America, America	Nominated	
1964	Michael Cacoyannis	Zorba the Greek	Nominated	Cacoyannis is a Cypriot-born Greek.
1995	George Miller	Babe	Nominated	Miller is an Australian of Greek descent. Shared with Doug Mitchell and Bill Miller.
2011	Alexander Payne	The Descendants	Nominated	Payne is an American-born Greek. Shared with Jim Burke and Jim Taylor.
2013	Anthony Katagas	12 Years a Slave	Won	Katagas is an American of Greek descent. Shared with Brad Pitt, Dede Gardner, Jeremy Kleiner and Steve McQueen.
2015	George Miller	Mad Max: Fury Road	Nominated	Shared with Doug Mitchell.
2018	Yorgos Lanthimos	The Favourite	Nominated	Shared with Ceci Dempsey, Ed Guiney and Lee Magiday.
2023	Yorgos Lanthimos	Poor Things	Nominated	Shared with Ed Guiney, Andrew Lowe and Emma Stone.
2025	Yorgos Lanthimos	Bugonia	Nominated	Shared with Ed Guiney, Andrew Lowe, Emma Stone, and Lars Knudsen.

== Best Director ==
Academy Award for Best Director
Year	Name	Film	Status	Milestone / Notes
1947	Elia Kazan	Gentleman's Agreement	Won	
1951	Elia Kazan	A Streetcar Named Desire	Nominated	
1954	Elia Kazan	On the Waterfront	Won	
1955	Elia Kazan	East of Eden	Nominated	
1963	Elia Kazan	America, America	Nominated	
1964	Michael Cacoyannis	Zorba the Greek	Nominated	
1969	Costa-Gavras	Z	Nominated	
1974	John Cassavetes	A Woman Under the Influence	Nominated	
2004	Alexander Payne	Sideways	Nominated	
2011	Alexander Payne	The Descendants	Nominated	
2013	Alexander Payne	Nebraska	Nominated	
2015	George Miller	Mad Max: Fury Road	Nominated	
2018	Yorgos Lanthimos	The Favourite	Nominated	
2023	Yorgos Lanthimos	Poor Things	Nominated	

== Best Actress ==
Academy Award for Best Actress
Year	Name	Film	Status	Milestone / Notes
1960	Melina Mercouri	Never on Sunday	Nominated	Only person nominated for a Greek-language role.

== Best Supporting Actor ==
Academy Award for Best Supporting Actor
Year	Name	Film	Status	Milestone
1961	George Chakiris	West Side Story	Won	Chakiris is an American of Greek descent.
1962	Telly Savalas	Birdman of Alcatraz	Nominated	Savalas is an American of Greek descent.
1967	John Cassavetes	The Dirty Dozen	Nominated	
1975	Chris Sarandon	Dog Day Afternoon	Nominated	Sarandon is an American of Greek descent.

== Best Supporting Actress ==
Academy Award for Best Supporting Actress
Year	Name	Film	Status	Milestone / Notes
1943	Katina Paxinou	For Whom the Bell Tolls	Won	First Greek person to win an Oscar.
1987	Olympia Dukakis	Moonstruck	Won	Dukakis is an American of Greek descent.

== Best Original Screenplay ==
Academy Award for Best Original Screenplay
Year	Name	Film	Status	Milestone / Notes
1968	John Cassavetes	Faces	Nominated	
1992	George Miller	Lorenzo's Oil	Nominated	Shared with Nick Enright.
2002	Nia Vardalos	My Big Fat Greek Wedding	Nominated	Vardalos is a Canadian of Greek descent.
2015	Yorgos Lanthimos; Efthimis Filippou	The Lobster	Nominated	

== Best Adapted Screenplay ==
Academy Award for Best Adapted Screenplay
Year	Name	Film	Status	Milestone / Notes
1963	Elia Kazan	America, America	Nominated	
1964	Michael Cacoyannis	Zorba the Greek	Nominated	
1969	Costa-Gavras	Z	Nominated	Shared with Jorge Semprún.
1982	Costa-Gavras	Missing	Won	Shared with Donald E. Stewart.
1990	Nicholas Kazan	Reversal of Fortune	Nominated	
1995	George Miller	Babe	Nominated	Shared with Chris Noonan.
1999	Alexander Payne	Election	Nominated	Shared with Jim Taylor.
2004	Alexander Payne	Sideways	Won	Shared with Jim Taylor.
2011	Alexander Payne	The Descendants	Won	Shared with Nat Faxon and Jim Rash.

== Best Production Design ==
Academy Award for Best Production Design
Year	Name	Film	Status	Milestone / Notes
1964	Vassilis Fotopoulos	Zorba the Greek	Won	Black & White category.
1974	Dean Tavoularis	The Godfather Part II	Won	American of Greek descent. Shared with Angelo P. Graham and George R. Nelson.
1978	Dean Tavoularis	The Brink's Job	Nominated	American of Greek descent. Shared with Angelo P. Graham and George R. Nelson.
1979	Dean Tavoularis	Apocalypse Now	Nominated	American of Greek descent. Shared with Angelo P. Graham and George R. Nelson.
1988	Dean Tavoularis	Tucker: The Man and His Dream	Nominated	Shared with Armin Ganz.
1990	Dean Tavoularis	The Godfather Part III	Nominated	Shared with Gary Fettis.

== Best Cinematography ==
Academy Award for Best Cinematography
Year	Name	Film	Status	Milestone / Notes
2013	Phedon Papamichael	Nebraska	Nominated	
2020	Phedon Papamichael	The Trial of the Chicago 7	Nominated	

== Best Film Editing ==
Academy Award for Best Film Editing
Year	Name	Film	Status	Milestone / Notes
2018	Yorgos Mavropsaridis	The Favourite	Nominated	
2020	Yorgos Lamprinos	The Father	Nominated	
2023	Yorgos Mavropsaridis	Poor Things	Nominated	

== Best Costume Design ==
Academy Award for Best Costume Design
Year	Name	Film	Status	Milestone / Notes
1960	Theoni V. Aldredge	Never on Sunday	Nominated	American-born Greek. Black & White Category
1962	Theoni V. Aldredge	Phaedra	Nominated	American-born Greek. Black & White Category
1974	Theoni V. Aldredge	The Great Gatsby	Won	American-born Greek. Black & White Category
2006	Patricia Field	The Devil Wears Prada	Nominated	American of Greek descent.
2010	Mary Zophres	True Grit	Nominated	American of Greek descent.
2016	Mary Zophres	La La Land	Nominated	American of Greek descent.
2018	Mary Zophres	The Ballad of Buster Scruggs	Nominated	American of Greek descent.
2022	Mary Zophres	Babylon	Nominated	American of Greek descent.

== Best Original Song ==
Academy Award for Best Original Song
Year	Name	Film	Song	Status	Milestone / Notes
1960	Manos Hatzidakis	Never on Sunday	For the song "Ta Paidia Tou Piraia" ("Never on Sunday").	Won	
2017	Sufjan Stevens	Call Me by Your Name	For the song "Mystery of Love".	Nominated	

== Best Original Score ==
Academy Award for Best Original Score
Year	Name	Film	Status	Milestone / Notes
1981	Vangelis	Chariots of Fire	Won	
2006	Alexandre Desplat	The Queen	Nominated	
2007	Marco Beltrami	3:10 to Yuma	Nominated	
2008	Alexandre Desplat	The Curious Case of Benjamin Button	Nominated	
2009	Marco Beltrami	The Hurt Locker	Nominated	Shared with Buck Sanders.
2009	Alexandre Desplat	Fantastic Mr. Fox	Nominated	French of Greek descent.
2010	Alexandre Desplat	The King's Speech	Nominated	French of Greek descent.
2012	Alexandre Desplat	Argo	Nominated	French of Greek descent.
2013	Alexandre Desplat	Philomena	Nominated	French of Greek descent.
2014	Alexandre Desplat	The Grand Budapest Hotel	Won	French of Greek descent.
2014	Alexandre Desplat	The Imitation Game	Nominated	French of Greek descent.
2017	Alexandre Desplat	The Shape of Water	Won	French of Greek descent.
2018	Alexandre Desplat	Isle of Dogs	Nominated	French of Greek descent.
2019	Alexandre Desplat	Little Women	Nominated	French of Greek descent.

== Best Makeup and Hairstyling ==
Academy Award for Best Makeup and Hairstyling
Year	Name	Film	Status	Milestone / Notes
2014	Elizabeth Gianni-Georgiou	Guardians of the Galaxy	Nominated	Shared with David White

== Best Animated Feature ==
Academy Award for Best Animated Feature
Year	Name	Film	Status	Milestone
2006	George Miller	Happy Feet	Won	

== Best Documentary Feature ==
Academy Award for Best Documentary Feature
Year	Name	Film	Status	Milestone
2009	Louie Psihoyos	The Cove	Won	American of Greek descent. Shared with Fisher Stevens.
2017	Agnès Varda	Faces Places	Nominated	Shared with JR.
2017	Rosalie Varda	Faces Places	Nominated	Shared with JR.

== Best Documentary Short Subject ==
Academy Award for Best Documentary Short Subject
Year	Name	Film	Status	Milestone / Notes
2016	Daphne Matziaraki	4.1 Miles	Nominated	

== Best Live Action Short Film ==
Academy Award for Best Live Action Short Film
Year	Name	Film	Status	Milestone
2000	Christina Lazaridi	One Day Crossing	Nominated	Shared with Joan Stein Schimke.

== Best Sound ==
Academy Award for Best Sound Editing
Year	Name	Film	Status	Milestone / Notes
2016	Mildred Iatrou	La La Land	Nominated	Shared with Ai-Ling Lee
2018	Mildred Iatrou	First Man	Nominated	Shared with Ai-Ling Lee

== Best Visual Effects ==
Year	Name	Film	Status	Milestone
2021	Nikos Kalaitzidis	Free Guy	Nominated	Shared with Swen Gillberg, Bryan Grill, and Daniel Sudick.

== Best Dance Direction ==
Academy Award for Best Dance Direction
Year	Name	Film	Status	Milestone
1935	Hermes Pan	Top Hat	Nominated	For "Piccolino" and "Top Hat".
1936	Hermes Pan	Swing Time	Nominated	For "Bojangles of Harlem".
1937	Hermes Pan	A Damsel in Distress	Won	For "Fun House".

== Special Achievement ==
Year	Name	Status	Milestone / Notes
1961	Petro Vlahos	Recipient	Technical Achievement Award: "For a camera flicker indicating device."
1965	Petro Vlahos	Recipient	Academy Award: "For the conception and perfection of techniques for Color Traveling Matte Composite Cinematography."; Shared with Ub Iwerks
1993	Petro Vlahos	Recipient	Medal of Commendation: "In appreciation for outstanding service and dedication in upholding the high standards of the Academy of Motion Picture Arts & Sciences."
1994	Petro Vlahos	Recipient	Gordon E. Sawyer Award
1995	Petro Vlahos	Recipient	Academy Award: "For the conception and development of the Ultimatte blue screen compositing process for motion pictures."
1998	Elia Kazan	Recipient	Honorary Award: "In appreciation of a long, distinguished and unparalleled career during which he has influenced the very nature of filmmaking through his creation of cinematic masterpieces."
2017	Agnès Varda	Recipient	Honorary Award: "Whose compassion and curiosity inform a uniquely personal cinema."

== Best International Feature Film ==
Academy Award for Best Foreign Language Film
Year	Film	Director(s)	Status	Milestone / Notes
1962	Electra	Michael Cacoyannis	Nominated	
1963	The Red Lanterns	Vasilis Georgiadis	Nominated	
1966	Blood on the Land	Vasilis Georgiadis	Nominated	
1977	Iphigenia	Michael Cacoyannis	Nominated	
2009	Dogtooth	Yorgos Lanthimos	Nominated	

== Nominations and Winners ==
No. of wins	No. of nominations
15	81

== See also ==
- List of Greek award-winning films in International Film Festivals
