= Mimis Traiforos =

Greek lyricist and writer (1912–1998)

- Μίμης Τραϊφόρος
- Born: Dimitrios Traiforos; 18 May 1912; Piraeus, Greece
- Died: 28 March 1998 (aged 85); Evangelismos Hospital, Athens, Greece
- Resting place: First Cemetery of Athens
- Citizenship: Greece
- Education: National Theatre of Greece Drama School; National and Kapodistrian University of Athens (LLB)
- Occupations: Lyricist; writer; director; poet; songwriter
- Years active: 1934–1998
- Spouses: Sofia Vembo (m. 1957; died 1978): Crystal
- Children: 1 (adopted)

Dimitrios Traiforos (Greek: Δημήτριος Τραϊφόρος; 18 May 1912 – 28 March 1998) was a Greek lyricist, writer, director, poet, and songwriter.

Dimitrios Traiforos was born on 18 May 1912, at the Archives of Piraeus building in Piraeus. In 1934 he collaborated as an actor with Attik and later in 1940 with singer Sofia Vembo, his future wife. Some of Vembo's best successes were of his lyrics. Also, notable composers of the era collaborated with him, such as Giorgos Mouzakis, Manos Hatzidakis, Michalis Souyioul and Kostas Giannidis.

He worked also as a theatrical writer and wrote many revues.

He died at Evangelismos Hospital on 28 March 1998, at age 85.
