= Ketty =

Origin
- Origin: English

Other names
- Related names: Kitty, Ketti, Kettie

Ketty or Ketti is a feminine given name. The name may refer to:

== People ==
=== First name ===
- Ketty Diridaoua (1921–1996), Greek actress
- Ketti Frings (1909–1981), American writer
- Ketty Galanta (born 1890s), Russian dancer, a member of the Ballets Russes
- Ketti Gallian (1912–1972), French actress
- Ketty Gilsoul-Hoppe (1868–1939), Belgian painter
- Ketty La Rocca (1938–1976), Italian artist
- Ketty Lester (born 1934), American singer and actress
- Ketty Lollia (born 1975), French writer and speaker (Dutch, French, English)
- Ketty Mathé (born 1988), French judoka

=== Surname ===
- Rina Ketty (1911–1996), Italian singer

== See also ==
- Ketti, a town in Tamil Nadu, India
- Katie
- Kitty (given name)
