= List of submissions to the 37th Academy Awards for Best Foreign Language Film =

1964 Best Foreign Language Film submissions

Highlights
- Oscar winner: (Italy) Yesterday, Today and Tomorrow
- Submissions: 18
- Debuts: 3

This is a list of submissions to the 37th Academy Awards for Best Foreign Language Film. The Academy Award for Best Foreign Language Film was created in 1956 by the Academy of Motion Picture Arts and Sciences to honour non-English-speaking films produced outside the United States. The award is handed out annually, and is accepted by the winning film's director, although it is considered an award for the submitting country as a whole. Countries are invited by the Academy to submit their best films for competition according to strict rules, with only one film being accepted from each country.

For the 37th Academy Awards, eighteen films were submitted in the category Academy Award for Best Foreign Language Film. Czechoslovakia, Israel and Turkey submitted films to the competition for the first time. The five nominated films came from France, Israel, Italy, Japan and Sweden.

Italy won for the seventh time with Yesterday, Today and Tomorrow by Vittorio De Sica.

== Submissions ==
Submitting country	Film title used in nomination	Original title	Language(s)	Director(s)	Result
Brazil	The Black God and the White Devil	Deus e o Diabo na Terra do Sol	Brazilian Portuguese	Glauber Rocha	Not nominated
Czechoslovakia	Lemonade Joe	Limonádový Joe	Czech	Oldřich Lipský	Not nominated
Denmark	Sextet	Sekstet	Danish	Annelise Hovmand	Not nominated
Egypt	Mother of the Bride	أم العروسة	Arabic	Atef Salem	Not nominated
France	The Umbrellas of Cherbourg	Les parapluies de Cherbourg	French	Jacques Demy	Nominated
Greece	Treason	Προδοσία	Greek	Kostas Manoussakis	Not nominated
Hong Kong	Between Tears and Laughter	新啼笑姻缘	Mandarin	Ho Meng Hua, Yueh Feng, Doe Ching, Luo Zhen, Yen Chun, Hsieh Chun	Not nominated
Israel	Sallah Shabati	סאלח שבתי	Hebrew	Ephraim Kishon	Nominated
Italy	Yesterday, Today and Tomorrow	Ieri, oggi, domani	Italian	Vittorio De Sica	Won Academy Award
Japan	Woman in the Dunes	砂の女	Japanese	Hiroshi Teshigahara	Nominated
Netherlands	The Human Dutch	Alleman	Dutch	Bert Haanstra	Not nominated
Poland	Passenger	Pasażerka	Polish	Andrzej Munk & Witold Lesiewicz	Not nominated
South Korea	The Deaf Samyong	벙어리 삼용	Korean	Shin Sang-ok	Not nominated
Spain	The Girl in Mourning	La Niña de luto	Spanish	Manuel Summers	Not nominated
Sweden	Raven's End	Kvarteret Korpen	Swedish	Bo Widerberg	Nominated
Taiwan	Lovers' Rock	情人石	Mandarin	Lei Pan	Not nominated
Turkey	Dry Summer	Susuz Yaz	Turkish	Metin Erksan & David E. Durston	Not nominated
Yugoslavia	Skoplje '63		Serbo-Croatian	Veljko Bulajić	Not nominated

== Sources ==
- Margaret Herrick Library, Academy of Motion Picture Arts and Sciences
