= Maria Vassiliou =

- Born: 16 September 1950; London, England
- Died: 5 July 1989 (aged 38); London, England
- Occupations: Actress, artist

Maria Vassiliou (Greek: Μαρία Βασιλείου), also known as Maro Vassiliou (Μάρω Βασιλείου) or Mari Vassiliou (Μαρί Βασιλείου), was a Cypriot actress.

== Biography ==
Born on 16 September 1950, she became an amateur actress and moved from London to Ekali, Athens after she was selected for the role of the eponymous prostitute in Evdokia, a 1971 film directed by Greek director Alexis Damianos. For her performance in Evdokia, Vassiliou was awarded the prize for best actress in the Thessaloniki International Film Festival. She was subsequently typecast, in films such as Erotism and passion. She was cast in a main role, as protagonist Electra's sister Chrysotheme, in the landmark Theodoros Angelopoulos film The Travelling Players, in 1975.

Vassiliou was diagnosed with cancer in Cyprus and went to London for treatment, dying in July 1989. She had kept her illness a secret, and her whereabouts were unknown until nearly the end, sparking rumours that she had been killed in 1977 in a car crash.
