= Social Decay =

1932 Greek silent film

- Theatrical Poster
- Greek: Κοινωνική Σαπίλα
- Directed by: Stelios Tatasopoulos
- Written by: Stelios Tatasopoulos
- Produced by: K. Eksarchopoulos
- Starring: Stelios Tatasopoulos; Gerasimos Arsenis
- Cinematography: Mihallis Gaziadis
- Edited by: Emmanuel Tzanetis
- Music by: Konstantinos Beta
- Production company: Fyzio Films
- Release date: 1932
- Running time: 5 reels 1h 2min minutes
- Country: Greece
- Languages: Silent film; Greek; English intertitles

Social Decay (Greek: Κοινωνική Σαπίλα) is a 1932 Greek silent film directed by Stelios Tatasopoulos. The film features social realism in Athens during the 1930s featuring prisons, drugs, gangs, sex, strikes, and clashes with law enforcement. The director assisted in the conservation and editing of the film in 1989 in collaboration with the Greek Film Archive. The film was discovered in a storage room at the Rex theatre in Athens during the 1980s.

The film tackles issues of social injustice during the 1930s and features a variation of social classes in Athens during the period. The film historically references the influx of refuges that overcrowded the city of Athens after the war and the poverty stricken situation. The artist demonstrates the upper, middle, and lower-class social structures and the struggle for labor reform. During that period a special law was passed entitled idionymon restricting union activity. Tatasopoulos boldly introduces the dark underworld of Athens featuring the use of heroin and hashish. He also shows viewers the struggle between a pimp and his grasp on a woman representing crimes control over the poverty-stricken nation. It was the only film of the era to address the lack of freedom of political expression and unionization.

== Plot ==
Dino is a student at the University of Athens. He was from outside the city. His parents were supporting him while he was studying law at the institution. Regrettably, his father was no longer able to support him and Dino finds a job as a dancer in the theatre to continue his studies. He falls in love with an actress named Niki but she abandons him for a wealthy industrialist named Stratakis. Dino gets involved with drug dealers and pimps and starts doing drugs namely hashish. They also try to convince him to become a drug dealer. His health begins to deteriorate. He was found in the street nearly dead and was rescued by tobacco factory workers. The workers find him a job at the tobacco factory. Dino eventually becomes a trade union leader. He attends a trade union conference but it is raided by police. Dino becomes a political prisoner. He is in a prison facility with criminals. Stratakis shows Niki a newspaper that Dino is in prison. Niki tries to help release Dino from prison and goes to visit him but he refuses to see her. Niki finds Stratakis with two other women and leaves him. Regrettably, Niki is seduced by a pimp. Dino finally gets released from prison. Niki waits for Dino at the prison door but he completely ignores her and the pimp uses violence to get Niki to follow his orders. Niki screams for help and Dino comes to her rescue and releases her from the pimp but Dino desires to forget the past leaving Niki for the last time. Dino continues his fight against social corruption and injustice.

== Cast ==
- Stelios Tatasopoulos as Dinos Vristhenis
- Danai Grizou as Niki
- Gerasimos Arsenis
- Ketty Diridaoua
- Joly Garbi as a dancer
- Kimon Spathopoulos

== Bibliography ==
- Poupou, Anna (December 2017). "Modern Space and Narration in the Greek Films of the Interwar Period". Film Icon: Journal of Greek Film Studies (4). ISSN 2241-6692. Archived from the original on 2 August 2019.
