= The Fear (1966 film) =

1966 film

- Directed by: Kostas Manoussakis
- Written by: Kostas Manoussakis
- Produced by: Theophanis A. Damaskinos; Victor G. Michaelides
- Starring: Elli Fotiou
- Cinematography: Nikos Gardelis
- Edited by: Giorgos Tsaoulis
- Music by: Yannis Markopoulos
- Release date: 1966
- Running time: 116 minutes
- Country: Greece
- Language: Greek

The Fear (Greek: Ο φόβος, translit. O fovos) is a 1966 Greek crime film directed by Kostas Manoussakis. It was entered into the 16th Berlin International Film Festival and the 1966 Cannes Film Festival as the official Greek entry.

== Cast ==
- Elli Fotiou as Chrysa Kavanari
- Anestis Vlahos as Anestis Kanalis
- Spiros Focás as Nikos
- Elena Nathanail as Anna Kanali
- Mary Chronopoulou as Mrs. Kanali
- Alexis Damianos as Dimitros Kanalis
- Kostas Gennatas
- Theodoros Katsadramis (as Thodoros Katsadramis)
