= Tasos Nousias =

Greek actor

- Born: 12 August 1973 (age 52); Ioannina, Greece
- Occupation: Actor
- Years active: 1996-present

Tasos Nousias (Greek: Τάσος Νούσιας; born 12 August 1973) is a Greek actor. He has appeared in more than thirty films since 1996.

== Selected filmography ==
Year	Title	Role	Notes
1996	Apontes		
2002	The King		
2011	Tungsten		
2014	The Journey		
2016	Lines		
