= Thanassakis o politevomenos =

Thanassakis o politevomenos Θανασάκης ο Πολιτευόμενος
- Directed by: Alekos Sakellarios
- Written by: Alekos Sakellarios; Christos Giannakopoulos
- Starring: Dinos Iliopoulos; Anna Synodinou; Vyron Pallis; Joly Garbi; Despo Diamantidou
- Music by: Michalis Souyioul
- Distributed by: Gloria Films
- Release date: 1954
- Running time: 79 mins
- Country: Greece
- Language: Greek

Thanassakis o politevomenos (Greek: Θανασάκης ο Πολιτευόμενος) is a 1956 Greek comedy film made by Finos Films. It was directed by Alekos Sakellarios and starring Dinos Iliopoulos, Byron Pallis and Anna Synodinou. The movie remained in history as the greatest acting from the microbes of politics and its politicians.

== Plot ==
A young girl from a great cod fishers that returned from Switzerland after the end of their studies of the married one with a young scientist Thanassakis, that they returned to Greece lonely and he "ran" as a politician. With the financial help from his brother-in-law that came from the elections without knowing. Quickly he proclaimed new elections and tried to run again, he asked repeatedly for his financial aid of his brother-in-law in which struck a code from the running that a new elective expedition that was his economic rule. He made an extorsive use that made from the election without a small success.

== Cast ==
- Dinos Iliopoulos as Meletis Kaplanis
- Anna Synodinou as Mary Kaplani-Govotsou
- Byron Pallis as Thanasakis Govotsos
- Kakia Panagiotou as Eleni Kaplani
- Giorgos Moutsios as SAS pilot
- Joly Garbi as Katina Kaplani
- Despo Diamantidou as Sophia
