= Rafika Chawishe =

- Occupation(s): Actress, director, activist
- Known for: Theater, film, video art, refugee activism
- Notable work: The Mimesis Machine, Miss Violence
- Awards: Ibsen Scholarship Award

Rafika Chawishe is an awarded stage and film actress, and a video art documentary and theater documentary director. She is a dynamic children rights' activist and has worked extensively with unaccompanied refugee minors at the first reception center in Lesvos, Moria, Greece.

As a theater-maker, she has been working in the political and documentary theater in Greece. In 2014, she created the company Zlap. Chawishe recently directed the performance the Mimesis Machine at the National Theatre of Oslo during the Ibsen Festival/Monsters of Reality. In 2017 she was selected by the NEON foundation to commission her new media installation performance, opening in May 2018 at the Museum Benaki. She also recently won the Ibsen scholarship Award by the Ibsen Awards for her theatre-media project based on political adaptation of Ibsen's Little Eyolf. Rafika Chawishe quoted "Since the beginning of the refugee issue escalation, it is said that Greece stands at the forefront of a critical battle in defense of the principles of freedom, open society, a and humanity on which the united Europe itself has been founded. However after one year of research and interviewing 150 unaccompanied minors in the island of Lesvos inside the first reception in the wing where they are held, this performance is actually questioning what are the principles of freedom and of the human responsibility and are they honestly defended or not? Little Eyolf is a play where human responsibility is questioned, where the parents refuse to accept the identity of their own child who is crippled. How is identity defined today? Who am I and am I accepted?"

As a film director Rafika has directed three short films that have been screened in various film festivals around the world (Seoul International FF, Palm Springs Short Fest, Cannes International FF/Short film Corner, Locarno FF). In 2014, Chawishe was selected as one of the 25 most promising European young Filmmakers at the Locarno Film Festival in the Young Filmmakers Academy.

As an actress she has performed in the awarded film of A. AVRANAS Miss Violence, produced by Faliro House Productions S.A. Currently, in the film Dance fight, love die by Asteris Koutoulas on Mikis Theodorakis, in which she holds a minor part of Melina Merkouri. The film was selected in the official competition of Hoff International Film Festival. On stage, she has performed many parts, in productions by the National Theater, the Athens Festival, the ancient theater of Epidavre, etc. We can mention indicatively the part of "Solange" in the play Maids of Jean Genet directed by the English director Bruce Myers, the Jewish wife of B. Brecht directed by F. Papadodima and the part of a transgender man Eidrian/Fiona in the play Rotterdam by Jon Brittain.
