= Despo Diamantidou =

Greek actress

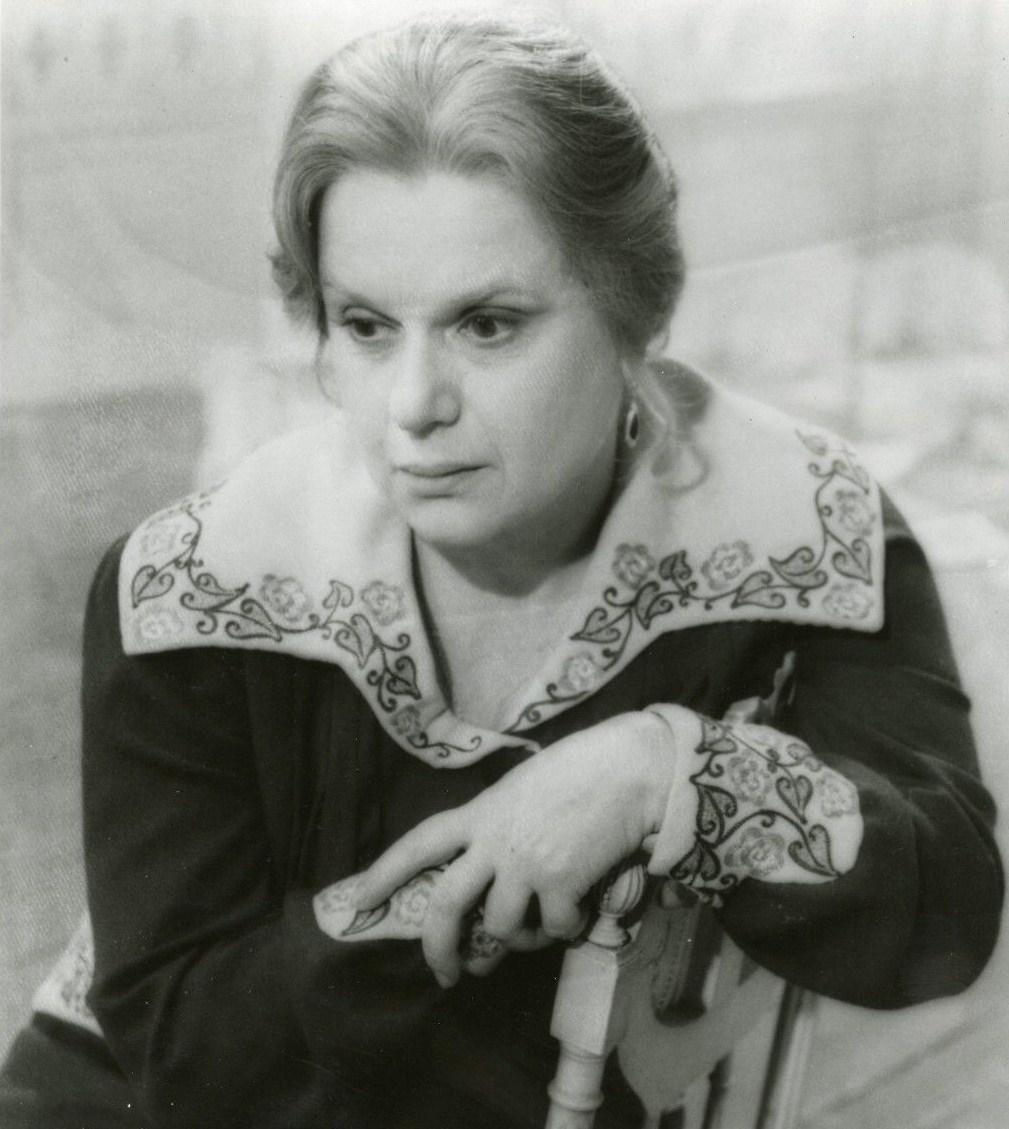
- Diamantidou in Jules Dassin's 1970 film Promise at Dawn
- Born: 13 July 1916; Piraeus, Greece
- Died: 18 February 2004 (aged 87); Athens, Greece
- Occupation: Actress
- Years active: 1949–2003
- Spouse: Andreas Philippides
- Relatives: Marios Philippides (son)

Despoina "Despo" Diamantidou (Greek: Δέσπω Διαμαντίδου; 13 July 1916 – 18 February 2004) was a Greek actress. She appeared in more than seventy films from 1949 to 2003, frequently in support of Melina Mercouri and directed four times by Jules Dassin.

She had flashy roles as the ringleader of the Piraeus prostitutes in Never on Sunday (1960) and as Woody Allen's Russian mother in Love and Death (1975). Despo also appeared as Tatiana in Alan King's summer replacement sitcom, Ivan the Terrible starring Lou Jacobi, which aired on ABC from 21 August to 18 September 1976.

Her son, Marios Philippides, was a historian and professor in the United States.

== Filmography ==
Year	Title	Role	Notes
1947	Paidia tis Athinas	Eleni	
1954	Thanassakis o politevomenos	Sophia	
1954	To koritsi tis geitonias	Kakia / Froso	
1956	I doukissa tis Plakentias kai o listarhos Bibisis	Narrator	
1957	To koritsi me ta paramythia	Lida's mother	
1958	A Matter of Dignity	Kaiti	
1959	Amaryllis, to koritsi tis agapis		
1960	Never on Sunday	Despo	
1960	Madalena	Giokari	
1960	I Hionati kai ta 7 gerontopallikara	Aglaia	
1960	To rantevou tis Kyriakis	Afroditi	
1961	Alice in the Navy	Alice's mother	
1961	O thanatos tha xanarthi	Liza	
1961	Gia sena, tin agapi mou		
1962	Prodomeni agapi	Vicky	
1962	Pote de se xehasa	Head Seamstress	
1962	O loustrakos	Maria's mother	
1962	Min erotevesai to Savvato...		
1962	Mana, kane kouragio	Mrs. Themeli	
1962	Angeloi tou pezodromiou		
1963	The Red Lanterns	Madame Pari	
1963	To tempeloskylo	Despoina	
1963	O babas mou ki ego!	Mrs. Papas	
1964	Topkapi	Voula	
1964	Monemvasia		
1964	Gamos ala... ellinika	Mina's Mother	
1964	To koritsi tis Kyriakis		
1964	Rimagmeno spiti		
1965	And the Wife Shall Revere Her Husband	Bebeka	
1965	Ohi, ...kyrie Johnson		
1965	Adistaktoi	Roza	
1965	To remali tis Fokionos Negri		
1965	Ponesa poly gia sena		
1965	Oi katafronemenoi		
1965	Dihasmos	The Lady	
1966	I Stefania	Woman Guard	
1966	Queen of Clubs	Marianthi	
1966	Kane ton pono mou hara		
1966	Horisame ena deilino	Zoi	
1967	Cry in the Wind	Priest's Wife	
1967	Sapila kai aristokratia	Mrs. Kalakou	
1967	Erotes sti Lesvo		
1967	Eis thanaton		
1970	Something for Everyone	Bobby	
1970	Promise at Dawn	Aniela	
1971	The Horsemen	Uljan	
1971	Made for Each Other	Group member	
1971	The Gang That Couldn't Shoot Straight	Mourner	
1973	The Werewolf of Washington	Gypsy	
1975	Love and Death	Boris' mother	
1978	A Dream of Passion	Maria	
1978	Ypothesi Polk		
1982	O teleftaios dialogos		
1985	Varieté	House Owner	
1989	Athoos i enohos?		
1991	O Tzonys Keln, kyria mou		
1996	Akropol	Seferiadou	
2001	Annas Sommer	María	
2002	Dyskoloi apohairetismoi: O babas mou	Grandmother	
2003	O haros vgike pagania		(final film role)
