= Vyron Pallis =

Greek actor

- Born: 1923; Athens, Greece
- Died: 14 December 1995 (aged 71–72) na
- Occupation: Actor
- Years active: 1948-1992

Vyron Pallis (1923 – 14 December 1995) was a Greek actor. He appeared in more than fifty films from 1948 to 1992.

== Selected filmography ==
| Year | Title | Role | Notes |
|---|---|---|---|
| 1956 | Thanassakis o politevomenos | | |
| 1958 | A Hero in His Slippers | | |
| 1961 | Antigone | | |
