= Marios Philippides =

American historian

- Born: 1950; Athens, Greece
- Died: December 27, 2022 (aged 71–72); Springfield, Massachusetts, United States
- Citizenship: Greece; United States
- Occupation: Historian
- Parent(s): Despo Diamantidou (mother); Andreas Philippides (father)

Academic background
- Education: Queens College, City University of New York; University at Buffalo - State University of New York
- Thesis: Longus: Antiquity's innovative novelist (1978)

Academic work
- Discipline: History
- Institutions: University of Massachusetts-Amherst
- Main interests: Greek historiography; Translation; Byzantine Studies

Marios Philippides (1950 – December 27, 2022) was a Greek-American historian who was Emeritus Professor in the Department of Classics at the University of Massachusetts-Amherst.

== Biography ==
Marios Philippides was born in 1950 to the actors Despo Diamantidou and Andreas Philippides. He came to the United States to study at age 19. He received his doctorate in Classics from the State University of New York at Buffalo. He taught at the University of Massachusetts-Amherst from 1978 until his retirement in May 2017. He received his Bachelor of Arts degree in Classics from Queens College, City University of New York in 1972 and his Master of Arts and PhD degrees from State University of New York at Buffalo in 1976 and 1978 respectively. He has published numerous articles on ancient religion, archaeology, and late-Byzantine historiography. His main focus has been the fall of Constantinople (1453), the annexation of the Balkans, and the conquest of the Franco-Byzantine Levant to the Ottoman Turks. Philippides has published a number of books, including his monumental 2011 study, The Siege and the Fall of Constantinople in 1453: Historiography, Topography, and Military Studies. Coauthored with Walter Hanak, this book's 11 chapters not only offer comprehensive analysis of the primary sources concerning this famous historical event but also subject the scholarly literature devoted to this topic over the last century and a half to searching scrutiny. Other key avenues of Philippides' scholarly inquiry have included ancient religion, archaeology, and late-Byzantine historiography. His numerous books and articles have ranged in topic from the ancient Greek novelist Longus to Mycenaean frescoes, and from the reception of ancient Troy in Renaissance Istanbul to detailed analysis of accounts of the city left by chroniclers of the 15th, 16th, and 17th centuries. He was interviewed for, and was one of many historical consultants to, Rise of Empires: Ottoman. Philippides was seriously injured after being struck by a pickup truck while crossing a street in Greenfield, Massachusetts on December 12, 2022. He was transferred to a hospital in Springfield, Massachusetts where he died from his injuries on December 27.

== Selected works ==
=== Books ===
- (Translator)The Fall of the Byzantine Empire: A Chronicle by George Sphrantzes, 1401–1477, University of Massachusetts Press, 1980.
- (Introduced, Translation and Commentary) Emperors, Patriarchs and Sultans of Constantinople: 1373–1513. An Anonymous Greek Chronicle of the Sixteenth Century, Hellenic College Press, 1990.
- (Translated and annotated together with Walter K. Hanak) The Tale of Constantinople: of its origin and capture by the Turks in the year 1453 by Nestor-Iskander, A.D. Caratzas, 1998.
- (Edited, Translated, and Annotated) Mehmed II the Conqueror and the Fall of the Franco-Byzantine Levant to the Ottoman Turks: Some Western Views and Testimonies, Arizona Center for Medieval and Renaissance Studies, 2007.
- (Together with Walter K. Hanak) The Siege and the Fall of Constantinople in 1453: Historiography, Topography, and Military Studies, Ashgate, 2011.
- (Together with Walter K. Hanak) Cardinal Isidore (c.1390–1462): A Late Byzantine Scholar, Warlord, and Prelate, Routledge, 2018.
- Constantine XI Dragaš Palaeologus (1404–1453): The Last Emperor of Byzantium, Routledge, 2019.

=== Articles ===
- Philippides, M. (January 1, 1998). The Fall of Constantinople 1453: Bishop Leonardo Giustiniani and His Italian Followers. Viator, 29, pages 189–226.
- Philippides, M. (January 1, 1998). Giovanni Guglielmo Longo Giustiniani, the Genoese condottiere of Constantinople in 1453. Byzantine Studies, pages 13–53.
- Marios Philippides. (January 1, 2004). Patriarchal Chronicles of the Sixteenth Century. Greek, Roman, and Byzantine Studies, 25, 1, pages 87–94.
- Marios Philippides. (January 1, 2004). The Fall of Constantinople: Bishop Leonard and the Greek Accounts. Greek, Roman, and Byzantine Studies, 22, 3, pages 287–300.
- Philippides, M. (January 1, 2007). The Fall of Constantinople 1453: Classical Comparisons and the Circle of Cardinal Isidore. Viator, 38, 1, pages 349–383.
- Marios Philippides. (January 1, 2012). Tears of the Great Church: The Lamentation of Santa Sophia. Greek, Roman, and Byzantine Studies, 52, 4, pages 714–737.
- Marios Philippides. (January 1, 2016). Venice, Genoa, and John VIII Palaeologus’ Renovation of the Fortifications of Constantinople. Greek, Roman, and Byzantine Studies, 56, 2, pages 377–397.
