= Tungsten (film) =

- Film poster
- Directed by: Giorgos Georgopoulos
- Starring: Vangelis Mourikis; Omiros Poulakis
- Release date: 24 November 2011
- Running time: 100 minutes
- Country: Greece
- Language: Greek

Tungsten is a 2011 Greek drama film directed by Giorgos Georgopoulos.

== Cast ==
- Vangelis Mourikis as Ticket Collector
- Omiros Poulakis as Bus Jumper
- Prometheus Aleifer as Job Candidate
- Tasos Nousias as Interviewer
- Kora Karvouni as Interviewer's Girlfriend
