= Evdokia (film) =

1971 Greek film

- Directed by: Alexis Damianos
- Written by: Alexis Damianos
- Produced by: Artemis Kapasakali
- Starring: Maria Vassiliou; George Koutouzis; Koula Agagiotou; Christos Zorbas
- Cinematography: Christos Mangos
- Edited by: Andreas Andreadakis; Matt McCarthy
- Music by: Manos Loizos
- Production company: Poreia; Katamor Productions
- Release date: September 21, 1971
- Running time: 92 minutes
- Country: Greece
- Language: Greek

Evdokia (Greek: Ευδοκία) is a 1971 Greek film. It is a drama of passion whose main characters are a sergeant and a prostitute (Evdokia) who get married after a brief passionate affair. Very soon, however, the influence of their environment strains their relationship, and the man tries to break away, but without success. The pair is surrounded by harsh light, rock, bare landscapes and military exercises, on the one hand, and sensuality and constrictions, on the other. Because of her occupation, Evdokia both attracts and repels the sergeant. The petit bourgeois environment, the lumpen elements, the social fringes and petty interests stifle the young couple: they apparently want to rebel, but never succeed.

With everything moving among violent sensuality, cruelty, coarseness, and total austerity, this "prosaic" story assumes the dimensions of an ancient tragedy. The inner struggle of the protagonists, the conflict of desires and values, the straightforward narration, vigorous pace, immediacy and sound construction constitute one of the most important works of the Greek cinema. In Greece, the film is mostly known for the popular Zeibekiko instrumental piece "Zeibekiko of Evdokia", written by Manos Loizos. In 1986, Evdokia was voted by the Greek Film Critics Association as the best Greek film of all time.

== Cast ==
- Maria Vassiliou as Evdokia
- Giorgos Koutouzis as Giorgos Paschos
- Koula Agagiotou as Maria Koutroubi
- Christos Zorbas as Giorgos
- Nasos Katakouzinos as Nontas
