= Treason (1964 film) =

1964 film

Treason (Προδοσία)
- Directed by: Kostas Manoussakis
- Written by: Aris Alexandrou; Kostas Manoussakis; Notis Peryalis
- Produced by: Klearhos Konitsiotis
- Starring: Petros Fyssoun
- Cinematography: Nikos Gardelis
- Edited by: Memas Papadatos
- Release date: September 1964
- Running time: 96 minutes
- Country: Greece
- Language: Greek

Treason (Greek: Προδοσία, translit. Prodosia) is a 1964 Greek drama film directed by Kostas Manoussakis. It was entered into the 1965 Cannes Film Festival. The film was also selected as the Greek entry for the Best Foreign Language Film at the 37th Academy Awards, but was not accepted as a nominee.

== Cast ==
- Petros Fyssoun - Lieutenant Carl von Stein
- Manos Katrakis - Professor Viktor Kastriotis
- Dimitris Myrat - Dr. Heinrich Stockmann
- Elli Fotiou - Liza
- Zorz Sarri - Mrs. Kastrioti
- Dimitris Nikolaidis - captain Zakas
- Dora Volanaki
- Giorgos Bartis]]
- Ioanna Carrer
- G. Daskalopoulos
- Vangelis Kazan - (as Evangelos Kazan) - police captain
- Spiros Maloussis
- Hristoforos Niakas
- Giorgos Oikonomou - soldier

== See also ==
- List of submissions to the 37th Academy Awards for Best Foreign Language Film
- List of Greek submissions for the Academy Award for Best Foreign Language Film
