= Ketty Diridaoua =

Greek actress and singer

Ketty Diridaoua Καίτη Ντιριντάουα
- Born: Aikaterini Oikonomou; Αικατερίνη Οικονόμου; 1921; Patras, Greece
- Died: February 9, 1996 (aged 74–75); Athens, Greece
- Occupation: Actress

Ketty Diridaoua (Greek: Καίτη Ντιριντάουα; 1921 – February 9, 1996) was a Greek actress and singer. In 1955 she married actor Kostas Hatzichristos. They had a daughter and divorced in 1975.

She was born Aikaterini Oikonomou (Αικατερίνη Οικονόμου). The name Diridaoua was a pseudonym that originates from the city Dire Dawa in Ethiopia. She died on February 9, 1996, at the age of 75.

== Filmography ==
- Koinoniki sapila (1932)
- Dipli thysia (1945)
- Ririka (1951)
