= Pavlos Tassios =

Greek film director

Pavlos Tassios (Greek: Παύλος Τάσσιος; 1 April 1942 – 2 October 2011) was a Greek film director.

Born in Polygyros, Greece, he directed such films as Nai men, alla... (1972), Oi prostates (1973), To vary... peponi (1977), Parangelia! (1980), Stigma (1982), Ta vaporakia (1983), and Knock Out (1986).

He was married to Katerina Gogou, with whom he had a daughter. He died in Athens, aged 69, on 2 October 2011, from cancer.
