= Pity (film) =

2018 film

- Film poster
- Directed by: Babis Makridis
- Written by: Babis Makridis; Efthymis Filippou
- Starring: Yannis Drakopoulos
- Release date: 19 January 2018 (Sundance)
- Running time: 97 minutes
- Country: Greece
- Language: Greek

Pity is a 2018 Greek drama film about self-pity directed by Babis Makridis. It was screened in the World Cinema Dramatic Competition section at the 2018 Sundance Film Festival.

== Plot ==
A lawyer severely addicted to sadness is in a huge need for pity, and is willing to do everything to evoke it from others. His wife is in a coma after an accident and, as long as her convalescence goes on, friends and neighbours do everything they can to comfort him. Meanwhile, he is dealing with a new job in assisting two siblings whose father was brutally killed, and examines all the dynamics of the murder.

When his wife miraculously comes out from the coma, the lawyer is in distress, noting the pity he receives is slowly vanishing. At first, he lies to people, claiming his wife is still unconscious. However, once everybody knows she is very much alive, he realizes he can't go on with his lie. He decides to self-inflict a huge source of sorrow: he first abandons his pet dog in the middle of the sea. When that doesn't work, he decides to escalate. Using the same dynamics of the murder he is working on, he kills his father, his wife and his own son. Despite all this, he is still not able to cry. In the end, only the dog has survived, swimming back to the shore safe and sound.

== Cast ==
- Yannis Drakopoulos as the lawyer
- Evi Saoulidou as the lawyer's wife
- Nota Tserniafski as the victim's daughter
- Makis Papadimitriou as the dry clean shop owner

== Reception ==
The film holds an approval rating of 74% on Rotten Tomatoes, based on 19 reviews, with an average rating of 6.1/10. Metacritic gave the film a score of 77 out of 100 based on 5 critical reviews, indicating "generally favorable reviews".
