= Kostas Giannidis =

Greek composer, pianist, and conductor

Ioannis Konstantinidis

Ioannis Constantinidis (Greek: Ιωάννης Κωνσταντινίδης), also known by the pen name Kostas Giannidis (Greek: Κώστας Γιαννίδης; 21 August 1903 – 17 January 1984), was a Greek composer, pianist and conductor.

Constantinidis was born in Smyrna, Ottoman Empire (today İzmir), in 1903. He came to Greece after the destruction of Smyrna and continued his studies in Berlin (1923–1931). He returned to Athens and worked as a conductor and composer at the musical theater composing many operettas, musical comedies, and revues. He would sign and publish his popular works as Kostas Giannidis, and his classical compositions as his birth name.

He died in Athens in 1984.

== Works ==
Constantinidis wrote symphonic, chamber music, music for films, compositions for piano, artsongs, and many popular songs.

=== Film music ===
He composed music for seven Greek movies, including:

- Οι Γερμανοί Ξανάρχονται (The Germans Strike Again)
- Ο μεθύστακας (The Drunkard)
