= Katerina Gogou =

Greek poet, author and actress (1940–1993)

- Born: 1 June 1940; Athens, Greece
- Died: 3 October 1993 (aged 53); Exarcheia, Athens, Greece
- Occupations: Artist, poet, actress
- Notable work: Films: To vary... peponi, Parangelia!, Ostria
- Spouse: Pavlos Tasios
- Children: 1

Katerina Gogou (Greek: Κατερίνα Γώγου; 1940–1993) was a Greek poet, author and actress.

== Personal life ==
Katerina Gogou was born in 1940 during World War II and the Axis occupation of Greece, for which she did not spend a pleasant childhood. She had a strict father with whom she lived during her childhood. Afterwards, in her teenage years, she lived with her mother.

She was married to film director Pavlos Tassios, with whom she had a daughter.

Later in her life she got addicted to alcohol and drugs. She was found dead in her apartment in October 1993 due to a drug overdose.

== Career ==
=== Acting ===
From the age of 5 years she started acting in children's plays. Professionally she debuted in theater with Dinos Iliopoulos' theater company in the play Ο Κύριος πέντε τοις εκατό (Mr. five percent) in 1961. She made her first cinematographic appearance in the film Ο άλλος (The other one / The other person). Most of the films she participated in were Finos Film productions. She became more widely known for roles of cheerful and carefree women like in the movies Το ξύλο βγήκε από τον παράδεισο (The wood came out of paradise - note that "ξύλο", literally translating to "wood", in Greek is an idiom meaning "the act of hitting someone") and Μια τρελή τρελή οικογένεια (A crazy crazy family). She has received the award for best actress in a lead role in Thessaloniki International Film Festival for the film Το βαρύ πεπόνι (The heavy melon - this phrase in Greek is an idiom referring to someone who tries to appear as a macho man), directed by Pavlos Tasios.

=== Poetry and writing ===
As a poet she was known for her revolutionary and aggressive writing. She was an anarchist and her political identity was often reflected in her poems, such as "Υπερασπίζομαι την Αναρχία" (I support/defend Anarchy) or "Εμένα οι φίλοι μου είναι μαύρα πουλιά" (My friends are black birds).

She also wrote some books with one of them, Τρία κλικ αριστερά (Three Clicks Left), being translated into English in 1983 by Jack Hirschman and published by Night Horn Books in San Francisco and also into Turkish in 2018 by Turkish author Mahir Ergun and published by Belge International Publishing House in Istanbul.

== Political activism ==
Katerina Gogou participated actively in the anarchist movement, especially in the Exarcheia neighborhood of Athens. She supported anarchist prisoners and participated in movements for the liberation of political prisoners. She was arrested several times, once as a suspect in the murder of two police officers by the Revolutionary Organization 17 Noemvri, for which she was declared innocent. She had a bad relationship with the police, and once filed a complaint after being attacked by police officers during a protest.

== Selected filmography ==
- Maiden's Cheek (1959) ..... Lazarou
- Law 4000 (1962) ..... Kleo
- And the Wife Shall Revere Her Husband (1965) ..... Pagona
- What Did You Do in the War, Thanasi? (1971) ..... Froso Karathanasi
