= Stelios Tatasopoulos =

Greek film director and producer

- Born: 1908; Constantinople, Ottoman Empire
- Died: 13 July 2000 (aged 91–92)
- Occupation: Director
- Years active: 1932-1972

Stelios Tatasopoulos (1908 – 13 July 2000) was a Greek film director and producer. He contributed to over twenty films from 1932 to 1972 including the 1932 film Social Decay.
