= Antigone (1961 film) =

Greek film

- The promotional poster for the English-subtitled video
- Directed by: George Tzavellas
- Written by: George Tzavellas (adaptation)
- Produced by: Demetrios Paris
- Starring: Irene Papas; Manos Katrakis
- Cinematography: Dinos Katsouridis
- Edited by: Giorgos Tsaoulis
- Music by: Arghyris Kounadis
- Release date: 1961
- Running time: 93 minutes
- Country: Greece
- Language: Greek

Antigone (Greek: Aντιγόνη, Antigone) is a 1961 Greek film adaptation of the Ancient Greek tragedy Antigone by Sophocles. It stars Irene Papas in the title role and was directed by Yorgos Javellas, who also adapted the play for the film.

The film follows the story of the play closely, but ends differently – instead of Creon retiring back to the palace as in the play, the film ends with Creon relinquishing his kingship and exiling himself out of Thebes.

== Plot ==
After Oedipus realises he married his mother Jocasta and steps down as king of Thebes, his two sons Eteocles and Polynices kill each other in the struggle for the succession. Creon, Jocasta's brother, ascends the throne and give the order that the body of Polynices should remain unburied, since he assaulted Thebes to dethrone his older brother.

Oedipus' daughter Antigone, after trying unsuccessfully to involve her sister Ismene in her scheme, defies the prohibition and buries her brother. Creon arrests both sisters, but eventually decrees that only Antigone has to be walled up alive, although the young woman is engaged to his son Haemon.

Only the seer Tiresias manages eventually to open Creon's eyes and explains to him that the ban on the burial would anger the gods. It is however too late: even if Creon has Polynices buried and is willing to free Antigone, she has already hanged herself in her prison in the meantime. Shortly after, Haemon commits suicide, and, after hearing the news, Eurydice, Haemon's mother and Creon's wife, also commits suicide. Creon, now broken by his own actions and the deaths of his family, renounces the throne.

== Cast ==
- Irene Papas as Antigone
- Manos Katrakis as Creon, king of Thebes
- Maro Kontou as Ismene, Antigone's sister
- Nikos Kazis as Haemon, Creon's son
- Ilia Livykou as Eurydice, Creon's wife
- Giannis Argyris as A Sentry
- Byron Pallis as A Messenger
- Tzavalas Karousos as Tiresias
- Thodoros Moridis as First Elder of Thebes
- Giorgos Vlahopoulos as Elder of Thebes
- Yorgos Karetas as Elder of Thebes
- Thanasis Kefalopoulos as Elder of Thebes

== Awards ==
=== Won ===
- Thessaloniki International Film Festival 1961: Irene Papas (Best Actress), Argyris Kounadis (Best Music)
- San Francisco International Film Festival 1961: Manos Katrakis (Best Actor)

=== Nominated ===
- Berlin International Film Festival 1961: Giorgos Tzavellas (Golden Bear)
- Golden Globe Awards 1962: Samuel Goldwyn International Award
