= Anna Synodinou =

Greek actress and politician (1927–2016)

- Άννα Συνοδινού

Deputy Minister of Social Services
- In office 20 November 1977 – 10 May 1980
- Prime Minister: Konstantinos Karamanlis

Member of the Hellenic Parliament for Athens A
- In office 17 November 1974 – 28 February 1990

Personal details
- Born: 21 November 1927 Loutraki, Greece
- Died: 7 January 2016 (aged 88) Athens, Greece
- Resting place: Cemetery of Vyronas, Athens
- Party: New Democracy
- Spouse: Georgios Marinakis (m. 1956; died 2009)
- Education: National Theatre of Greece Drama School
- Occupation: Actress; (1954–2009)

Anna Synodinou (Greek: Άννα Συνοδινού; 21 November 1927 – 7 January 2016) was a Greek actress and politician.

Born in Loutraki, she studied at the National Theatre of Greece Drama School. She mainly excelled in ancient drama and won the Kotopouli theatre award twice. She also performed in Shakespearean stage productions. She had a brief but notable career in cinema, and a sparse presence in Greek television where she was awarded for her role in the series Matomena Homata.

She was elected to the Hellenic Parliament for New Democracy MP in 1974 and remained an MP until 1990. She served as deputy minister for social services from 1977 to 1980.

== Filmography ==
Year	Title	Role	Notes
1954	Thanassakis o politevomenos	Mairy	
1956	Dollaria kai Oneira	Mary	
1958	O Anthropos tou Trenou	Mado Kostopoulou	
1959	Oresteia		
1960	Germa		
1962	The 300 Spartans	Queen Gorgo	
1962	Electra	Ilektra	
1992	O agapitikos tis voskopoulas		
