= Michalis Souyioul =

Greek composer

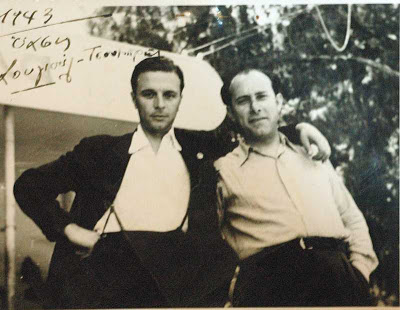
- Souyioul on right in 1943
- Born: Μιχαήλ Σουγιουλτζόγλου; 1 August 1906; Aydın, Aidin Vilayet, Ottoman Empire
- Died: 16 October 1958 (aged 52); Athens, Greece
- Resting place: First Cemetery of Athens
- Occupations: Songwriter; composer
- Years active: 1931–1958
- Children: 4
- Musical career
- Genres: Light music

Michail Sougioultzoglou (Greek: Μιχαήλ Σουγιουλτζόγλου [mixaˈil suʝulˈdzoɣlu]; 1 August 1906 – 16 October 1958), known professionally as Michalis Souyioul (Μιχάλης Σουγιούλ [miˈxalis suˈʝul]) was a prominent Greek composer of light music in the early 20th century.

== Biography ==
He was born in Aydın, in the Ottoman Empire on 1 August 1906. His family were wealthy skinners. They emigrated to Athens in 1920. He was a relative of well-known Greek photographer Nelly's.

He initially worked as a self-employed pianist and later went to Marseille to study music. From 1931, he toured Europe with an Argentinian orchestra.

During the Interwar period and the 1950s, he was extremely prolific, writing over 700 songs in different styles (tango, waltz, serenades, folk, laiko, romances amongst others).

He composed also music for the Greek theatre (45 productions) and for Greek movies (ten films). His compositions were among some of the most popular pieces of the time. He co-worked with some of the most well-known lyricists (such as Alekos Sakellarios) and singers (Sofia Vembo, Nikos Gounaris, Tony Maroudas, Kalouta sisters, Stella Greka) of the time.

Souyioul had four children: daughters Maria, Iro and Aliki and son Thanos. Thanos (born 1942) was an actor (who worked alongside famous actress Aliki Vougiouklaki in films such as Maiden's Cheek and Alice in the Navy) and musician in a well-known Greek pop band of the early 1960s, The Juniors. Thanos was killed in a car accident on 10 October 1965, along with fiancée, the manager of The Juniors and the manager's wife.

Souyioul died of a stroke in Athens on 16 October 1958. Many mourners in Athens turned out for his funeral and burial in the First Cemetery of Athens.
