= Applause (1944 film) =

- Directed by: George Tzavellas
- Starring: Kleon Triantafyllou; Zinet Lakaz
- Release date: 1 May 1944
- Running time: 78 minutes
- Country: Greece
- Language: Greek

Applause (Greek: Χειροκροτήματα) is a 1944 Greek drama film directed by George Tzavellas.

== Cast ==
- Kleon Triantafyllou (Attik) - Alfa
- Zinet Lakaz - Nora
- Dimitris Horn - Stefanos
- Alekos Alexandrakis
