= Alexis Damianos =

Greek film and theatre director (1921–2006)

Alexis Damianos (Greek: Αλέξης Δαμιανός; 1921–2006) was a Greek, film/theatre and television director.

== Biography ==
Damianos was born in Athens on January 21, 1921. He studied at the National Theatre of Greece and the philosophy department of the University of Athens.

He was the founder of "Experimental Theatre" and "Poreia Theatre", where he directed a lot of plays.

Damianos directed three feature films which contributed to the development of Greek cinema and the most famous of them is Evdokia (1971).

He died in Athens on May 4, 2006.

== Filmography ==
- Cornerstone (Greek: ...μέχρι το πλοίο) (1967)
- Evdokia (Greek: Ευδοκία) (1971)
- The Charioteer (Greek: Ηνίοχος) (1995)

== Bibliography ==
- Vrasidas Karalis, A history of greek cinema bibliography, New York: Continuum, 2012. 121. Print.
