= Attik =

Greek musician

Attik (Greek: Αττίκ, real name Kleon Triantafyllou (Κλέων Τριανταφύλλου); 19 March 1885 – 29 August 1944) was a significant Greek composer of the early 20th century.

== Biography ==
Attik was born in Athens and grew up in Egypt, where he took music lessons. From 1907 until 1930, he lived in Paris.

In 1930, he went to Athens and created the famous Mandra of Attik, a group of artists, singers and performers, directed by himself.

In 1944, a few months before the end of the Axis occupation of Greece, he appeared in the film of Giorgos Tzavellas Hirokrotimata (1944). A little later he committed suicide in Athens by taking an overdose of his sedative medicine Veronal, after having been beat up by a German soldier.
