= And the Wife Shall Revere Her Husband =

And the Wife Shall Revere Her Husband Η δε γυνή να φοβήται τον άντρα
- Directed by: George Tzavellas
- Written by: George Tzavellas
- Starring: Maro Kontou; Giorgos Konstantinou
- Cinematography: Nikos Gardelis
- Music by: Kostas Kapnisis
- Release date: 28 June 1965
- Running time: 105 minutes
- Country: Greece
- Language: Greek

Plaka, Athens Greece, the location of the film

And the Wife Shall Revere Her Husband (Greek: Η δε γυνή να φοβήται τον άνδρα) is a 1965 Greek comedy film. The film won the best director award at the 1st Chicago International Film Festival.

== Plot ==
Antonis and Eleni are an unmarried couple, who live in a traditional neighbourhood in Athens. Society being what it is, living together for so long without being married has marginalized Eleni and made her the target of gossip and mistreatment in the neighborhood. Antonis is a literate employee of a ministry but Eleni is an illiterate younger woman from a poor family. Due to the social divide between them, Antonis underrates Eleni and treats her like a slave. Nevertheless, she carries on loving him and serving him. After the sudden death of one of his friends, Antonis is shaken and realizes he needs to marry Eleni so that she's provided for should something happen to him. But things change after their marriage. Eleni is now officially his wife, and with the aid of his friends’ wives starts to have more demands and she claims equality. Antonis, used to being treated like the master of the house, doesn't put up with the new situation and asks for a divorce. Several years later the two former spouses meet in their old house which is being demolished. Antonis has long realized how good his life with Eleni was and how unfairly and selfishly he had acted. They reminisce their time together and decide to give their relationship another chance. The film features a balanced mix of humour with emotion and nostalgia, also filled with the beautiful pictures of Athens in those years.

== Cast ==
- Maro Kontou - Eleni Kokovikou
- Giorgos Konstantinou - Antonis Kokovikos
- Despo Diamantidou - Bebeka
- Stavros Xenidis - Haralabos
- Katerina Gogou - Pagona
- Dimitris Kallivokas - Iason Panginaropoulos
- Lili Papayanni - Katina
- Tasso Kavadia - Aglaia Papamitrou
- Nassos Kedrakas - Mikes
- Kaiti Lambropoulou - Maro
- Despoina Nikolaidou - Klara Panginaropoulou
- Nikos Filipopoulos - Themistocles

== Awards ==
List of awards and nominations
Award	Category	Recipients and nominees	Result
1st Chicago International Film Festival	Best Director	George Tzavellas	Won
