= Lines (film) =

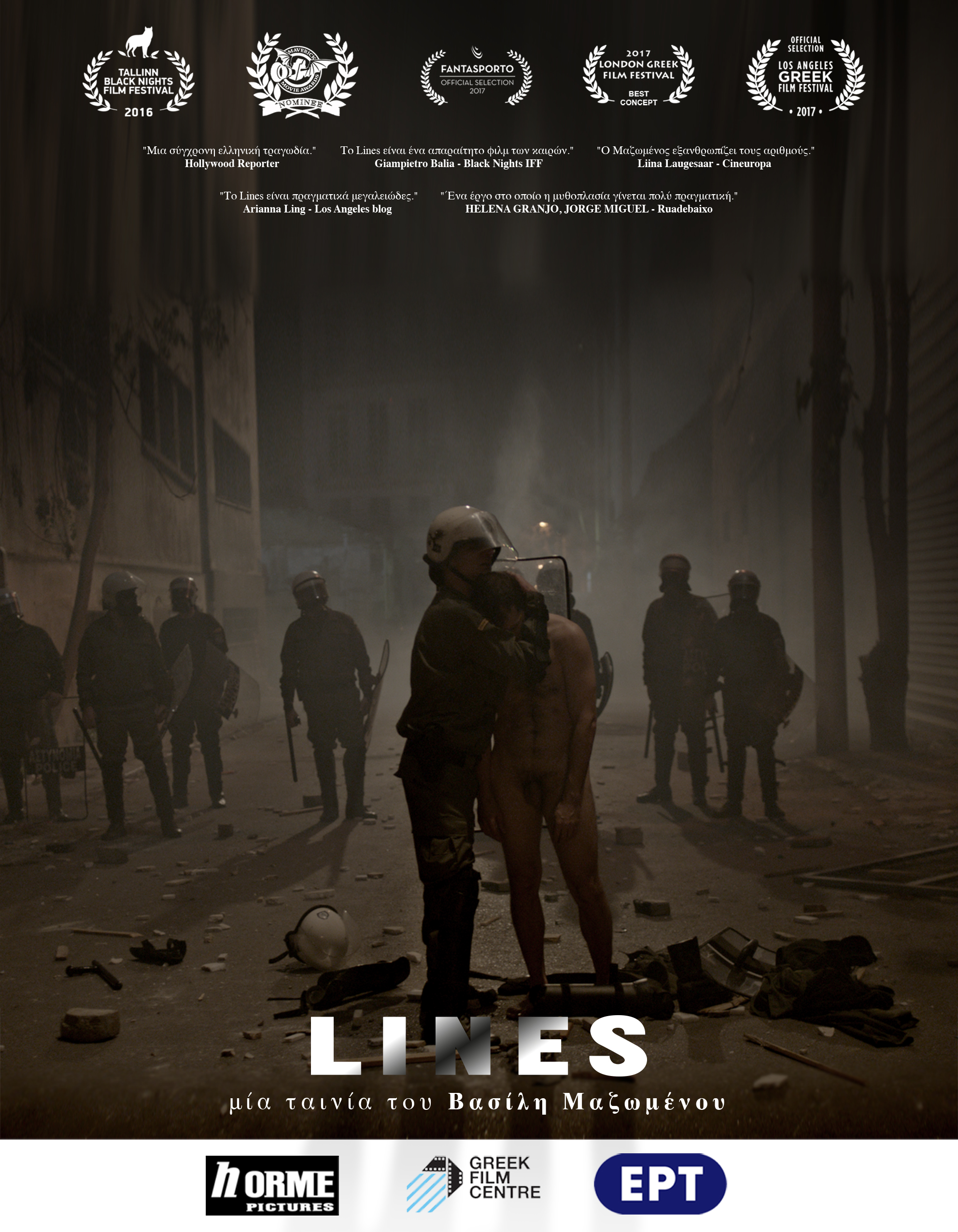
- Lines poster
- Directed by: Vassilis Mazomenos
- Screenplay by: Vassilis Mazomenos
- Produced by: Vassilis Mazomenos
- Starring: Themis Panou; Tasos Nousias; Anna Kalaitzidou; Thodoros Katsafados
- Cinematography: George Papandrikopoulos
- Music by: Alexandros Christaras, Michael Nivolianitis Dna (Greek Musical Collective)
- Release date: November 21, 2016 (Tallinn Black Nights)
- Running time: 88 minutes
- Country: Greece
- Language: Greek

Lines (Greek: "Γραμμές") is a 2016 Greek feature film, directed by the Greek director, writer and producer Vassilis Mazomenos.

== Plot ==
The film refers to a modern-day Greek tragedy, focused on seven individuals suffering in the economic crisis that has devastated Greece . The source of the film comes from the numerous suicides that were prompted by the economic crash (2009-).

== Cast ==
- Themis Panou as P.M.
- Tasos Nousias as farmer
- Anna Kalaitzidou as manager
- Thodoros Katsafados as homeless man
- Kostas Berikopoulos as factory owner
- Thanassis Chalkias as husband of sick wife
- Vassilis Georgosopoulos as policeman
- Leonidas Kakouris as call operator
- Kostas Dalianis as CEO
- Kostas Xikominos as police officer
- Adrian Frieling as E.U. clerk
- Nikos Pantelidis as P.M. secretary
- Thekla Gaiti as sick wife
- Ileana Panagiotouni as factory owner's sister
- Evita Papaspirou as E.U. secretary

== Festivals ==
The world premiere of the film was made on 21 November 2016, at the Tallinn Black Nights Film Festival in the main competition programme, Also was in main competition at the 37th Fantasporto International Film Festival. and official selection at the 9th Bengaluru International Film Festival in India, at 28th Ankara International Film Festival, at Paris Panorama of contemporary Greek cinema 2017, at 10th London Greek Film Festival 2017, at 11th Los Angeles Greek Film Festival 2017, at 24th Greek Film Festival in Australia, at 2017 BLOW-UP · International Arthouse FILM FEST in Chicago, at 10th "this human world – International Human Rights Film Festival" in Vienna Austria, at 2017 Maverick Movie Awards, at Calgary European Film Festival in Canada, at Edinburgh GIFF in Scotland, at Accolade Global Film Competition in California, at Hellas FilmBox in Berlin, at FEST (Belgrade) 46th IFF, at 6th Montreal Greek film festival in Canada, at 22nd European film festival Bucharest in Romania, at 27th DU CINÉMA GREC in Strasbourg, at 2018 South-East European Film Festival in Berlin and Paris, at Scandinavian International Film Festival στο Helsinki, at 13th International Human Rights Film Festival, Albania, at Sose International Film Festival in Yerevan, Armenia, at Chania Film Festival in Greece, at Rome Independent Prisma Awards in Italy.

== Awards ==
Lines was nominated for the best film in 2016 Tallinn Black Nights Film Festival, in 37th Fantasporto International Film Festival, in 2017 Los Angeles Greek Film Festival, in 30th Athens Panorama of European Cinema, in 10th "this human world" in Vienna, in 2018 Hellas FilmBox on Berlin, in 8th Philosophical IFF in Macedonia. The film won the best concept award for Fiction Feature in the 10th London Greek Film Festival. In 2017 Maverick Movie Awards Lines won award for best directing and had two nominations for best picture and best screenplay. The film was also nominee for best director (Tarkovsky Award) and best writing (Tonino Guerra Award) in 2017 BLOW-UP · International Arthouse FILM FEST in Chicago and in Accolade Global Film Competition 2017 in United States won the award of Merit. In 2018 was nominated for best film in Hellenic Film Academy (Greek) awards. In 2018 in See film festival Berlin Paris Lines awarded with the director's award. Αt Scandinavian International Film Festival Helsinki and at Rome Independent Prisma Awards in Italy the film won in both the best feature award. At 5th Sose International Film Festival (2018) in Armenia the film won best script and best camera awards. In 2019 the film won Best Drama in Vegas Movie Awards.

== Reviews ==
Giampietro Balia wrote in the Tallinn Black Nights Film Festival catalogue: " A stifling symphony of defeat for human kind as a whole, "Lines" is a necessary film in times in which numbers and ideological yarns dominate the political agenda, much to the disadvantage of the millions of individuals ensnared in a system that has proven to be frail and unreliable." Also in the same festival's official page is written : "Director Vasilis Mazomenos offers a uncompromisingly bleak, ghastly and haunting view of modern Greece in "Lines". Seven chapters about seven broken individuals, about what it means to live in Greece in these hard times of financial restraint". Liina Laugesaar wrote in Cineuropa: "Lines does not focus on the political side of the crisis, but concentrates on the people who had to endure it. Everything extraneous is left out of the story. Mazomenos puts faces back on the numbers and creates a harrowing testament to the challenging years that have left scars on many." Élie Castiel wrote in Séquences: "A movie shock, surprising, nocturnal, shouting his rage through seven tables, seven paintings of durations approximately equal, the whole forming a coherent whole despite the side Byzantine intentionally of each Party. Straight lines, circulars, symmetrical, disordered also, as if the logic of the ancient Greece had disappeared for ever"
