= Alexandros Avranas =

Greek film director

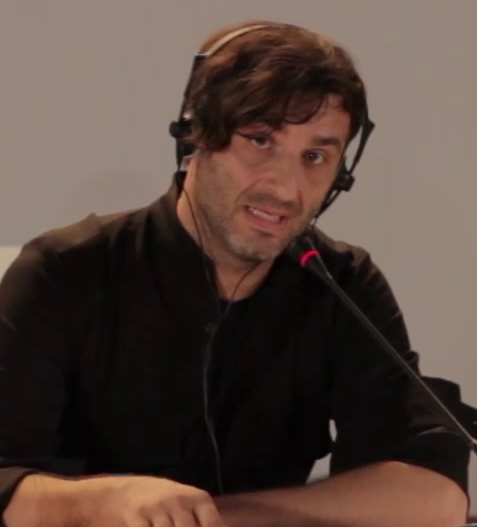
- Avranas at the 70th Venice Film Festival (2013)
- Born: 1977 (age 47–48); Larissa, Greece
- Occupation(s): Film director, screenwriter

Alexandros Avranas (born 1977) is a Greek film director best known for such films as Miss Violence and Dark Crimes starring Jim Carrey.

At the 2013 Venice Film Festival Avranas won the Silver Lion for Best Director for Miss Violence.
