= Kostas Manoussakis =

Greek film director

- Born: January 1929; Greece
- Died: 26 August 2005 (aged 76); Athens, Greece
- Occupations: Film director, screenwriter
- Years active: 1958–1966

Kostas Manoussakis (Greek: Κώστας Μανουσάκης; January 1929 – 26 August 2005) was a Greek film director and screenwriter. His 1964 film Treason was entered into the 1965 Cannes Film Festival and his 1966 film The Fear was entered into the 16th Berlin International Film Festival.

== Selected filmography ==
- Treason (1964)
- The Fear (1966)
