= Miss Violence =

- Theatrical release poster
- Directed by: Alexandros Avranas
- Written by: Alexandros Avranas
- Produced by: Vasilis Chrysanthopoulos; Alexandros Avranas
- Starring: Christos Loulis
- Edited by: Nikos Helidonides
- Production companies: Faliro House Productions; Plays2Place Productions
- Release dates: 1 September 2013 (Venice); 7 November 2013 (Greece)
- Running time: 98 minutes
- Country: Greece
- Language: Greek

Miss Violence is a 2013 Greek psychological thriller film directed and written by Alexandros Avranas. The plot revolves around a family whose young granddaughter mysteriously committed suicide. The film was nominated upon its release for 8 Hellenic Film Academy Awards, winning 2: for Best Actor (Themis Panou) and Best Supporting Actress (Renni Pittaki). It also won the Aluminum Horse for Best Script at the Stockholm International Film Festival.

== Plot ==
On her eleventh birthday, Angeliki dies by suicide by jumping off the balcony of her family's apartment. This incident deeply affects Angeliki’s family, consisting of her grandparents, the unnamed Grandfather and Grandmother; their eldest daughter and Angeliki's mother Eleni; Myrto, Angeliki's fourteen year-old aunt and the grandparents' younger daughter, and Eleni’s two other children, Philippos and Alkmini. The police investigate and ask if Angeliki may have suffered domestic trauma, but the family claims her death was an accident.

Despite their publicly modest demeanor, the children behave uncomfortably in the presence of their Grandfather, who is seemingly attempting to bring normalcy back to the family following the incident. The Grandfather appears friendly towards his neighbors and colleagues, hiding his abusive, oppressive and misogynistic views towards his daughters and grandchildren at home. The family is not allowed to refuse the Grandfather's instructions nor show emotions such as sadness; Eleni is chastised by her father for secretly mourning her daughter. Meanwhile, out of fear of her husband's wrath, the Grandmother helplessly colludes with her husband and follows his commands. The abuse continues as the Grandfather degrades Philippos for causing trouble at school, and being inferior in intelligence to his sister Alkmini. Myrto tries to reach out to her teacher, to no avail.

As the film continues, it is revealed that the Grandfather has been forcing his daughters Eleni and Myrto to dabble in prostitution in exchange for money, as well as regularly joining in and raping his own daughters. Eleni's ordeals have resulted in her becoming pregnant with her three children. Myrto is implied to also be Eleni's child conceived with her father. Myrto copes with her abuse by self-harming, which her complicit Mother covers up.

It is revealed that Myrto told Angeliki before her suicide that she and Eleni were first sold into sex by their father when they turned eleven, the age their patriarch considers appropriate for the commencement of sexual violence towards them; this led to Angeliki taking her own life to avoid her fate.

Eleni's father accompanies her to a gynecologist who confirms that she is pregnant again; Eleni refuses to reveal who the baby's father is. Myrto is later fetched from school by her father and taken to be gang raped by two paying customers, before her father rapes her as well. Alkmini is later sold by her grandfather to a pedophile for sex.

After seeing the traumatized Alkmini turn to Eleni for comfort, the Grandmother kills her husband in bed. The next day, Eleni discovers her father is dead and begins to rejoice at her freedom. Once in the kitchen, however, she sees Myrto, Philippos and Alkmini falling in line in front of the Mother, who has assumed control now that her husband is dead. The Mother orders Eleni to lock the door and Eleni complies.

== Cast ==
- Themis Panou as Father
- Reni Pittaki as Mother
- Eleni Roussinou as Eleni
- Sissy Toumasi as Myrto
- Maria Skoula as a social welfare lady
- Constantinos Athanasiades as Philippos
- Kalliopi Zontanou as Alkmini
- Chloe Bolota as Angeliki
- Rafika Chawishe as a civil status servant

== Reception ==
Miss Violence entered the competition at the 70th Venice International Film Festival. Avranas won the Silver Lion for Best Director and actor Themis Panou won the Volpi Cup for Best Actor. It was also shown at the 2013 Toronto Film Festival. It is a Faliro House Productions and Plays2place Productions film.

=== Critical response ===
The film received mostly positive reviews and was selected for the Fedeora prize for the best film from the Mediterranean region, while Greek director Alexandros Avranas was given the Silver Lion for Best Director for his work. On Rotten Tomatoes, Miss Violence holds an approval rating 81%, with an weighted average score of 6.10. The website hosts 21 international critic reviews. The website's consensus reads: "Brutal but ablaze with gripping imagery, Miss Violence offers a grim exploration of societal and domestic horrors in modern-day Greece."
