= Vassilis Photopoulos =

Greek painter, film director, art director, and set designer

Vassilis Photopoulos (Greek: Βασίλης Φωτόπουλος) (1934, Kalamata – 14 January 2007, Athens, Greece) was an influential Greek painter, film director, art director and set designer.

He was an Academy Award winner for the film Zorba the Greek for art direction.

Vassilis Photopoulos was born in Kalamata and studied painting at a very young age under Vangelis Drakos. He appeared for the first time on the art scene as the stage designer for play "Servant Lady", in the Athens Opera House.

He also worked for the National Greek Theatre, the Public Theatre of Northern Greece, and the Liberal Theatre.

In 1966, he worked with Francis Ford Coppola in the film You're a Big Boy Now, which starred Geraldine Page, Rip Torn, Karen Black, Julie Harris and Elizabeth Hartman.

He died in Athens in 2007, aged 72.
