= George Tzavellas =

Greek film director (1916–1976)

George Tzavellas, also rendered Giorgos Tzavellas, Yiorgos Tzavellas, or Yorgos Javellas (Greek: Γιώργος Τζαβέλλας, 1916, Athens – October 18, 1976), was a Greek film director, screenwriter, and playwright. His filmmaking was particularly influential, with critic Georges Sadoul considering him "one of the three major postwar Greek directors" (along with Michael Cacoyannis and Nikos Koundouros).

Tzavellas wrote at least 26 plays, in addition to writing the scripts for all of his films. Among his notable films are Marinos Kontaras (1948), the drama O methystakas (1950), and Antigone (1961), a cinematic adaptation of the Sophocles tragedy. His adaptation of Antigone reimagined it in the language of realist cinema, omitting stylized elements of Greek stageplay such as the chorus, and attempting to convey the same information via setting and dialogue. In 1964 he was a member of the jury at the 14th Berlin International Film Festival. His masterpiece, however, is the 1955 film The Counterfeit Coin (I kálpiki líra), a film in four parts, linking the stories of several people through their transactions of a single counterfeit gold coin.

== Filmography ==
- Applause (1944)
- Forgotten Faces (1946)
- Marinos Kontaras (1948)
- The Drunkard (1950)
- The Grouch]] (1952)
- Lily of the Harbor (1952)
- The Taxi Driver (1953)
- The Counterfeit Coin (1955)
- The Lovers Arrive (1956)
- We Have Only One Life (1958)
- Antigone (1961)
- And the Wife Shall Revere Her Husband (1965)
