= Brillanti =

Brillanti is a surname. Notable people with the surname include:

- Lilí Brillanti (born 1973), Mexican television actress and TV host
- Zaza Brillanti (1897–1975), Greek silent film and theater actress
