= Fustanella =

Traditional men's garment in the Balkans

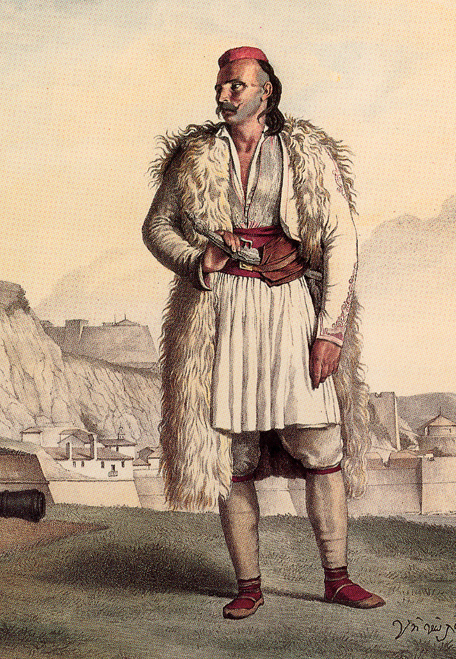
A Souliote warrior wearing fustanella, by Louis Dupré.

Fustanella is a traditional pleated skirt-like garment that is also referred to as a kilt worn by men in the Balkans.

The Albanian traditional costume with fustanella had identified the special troops that Albanians constituted within the Ottoman Empire, whose military prowess became renowned, especially in the era of the Ottoman Albanian pashas Ali of Yanina and Muhammad Ali of Egypt. During the late 18th and early 19th centuries Albanian warriors wore it in the Kingdom of Naples and the Ionian Islands. In the 1810s, the Albanian warrior dress was officially adopted by a British regiment in the Ionian Islands. In the 1820s, it became a principal visual symbol of Philhellenism, and during the Greek War of Independence it was worn by the revolutionary fighters. At that time its notoriety as a symbol of male bravery and heroism grew considerably across the Ottoman Empire and spread throughout Europe. Following the Greek independence, fustanella and accompanying embroidered waistcoats and jackets were adopted by the nascent Greek army. In 1835, it was proclaimed the official court costume and eventually it became the Greek national dress. The Albanian-Greek attire thereafter acquired popularity among peoples who wanted to dress in a courageous heroic manner.

In modern times, the fustanella is part of Balkan folk dresses. In Greece, a short version of the fustanella is worn by ceremonial military units such as the Evzones since 1868. In Albania it was worn by the Royal Guard in the interbellum era. Both Greece and Albania claim the fustanella as a national costume.

== Name ==
The word fustanella derives from Italian fustagno 'fustian' and -ella (diminutive), the fabric from which the earliest fustanella were made. This in turn derives from Medieval Latin fūstāneum, perhaps a diminutive form of fustis, 'wooden baton'. Other authors consider this a calque of Greek xylino ξύλινο, literally 'wooden' i.e. 'cotton'; others speculate that it is derived from Fostat, a suburb of Cairo where cloth was manufactured.

The garment is also known by other names; including tsamika/çamika, associated with the ethnonym of the Albanian sub-group Chams, and kleftiki, associated with brigands known as klephts.

== Origins ==
A terracotta figurine with a fustanella garment (i.e. a pleated skirt wore by a man) was found in Durrës, in present-day central Albania, dating back to the 4th century CE, clearly providing an early archaeological evidence of a fustanella.

According to a hypothesis the fustanella was originally worn by the Illyrians. It has been claimed that in the 13th century the fustanella was a common dress for Dalmatian men, regarded as one of the Illyrian ancestors of the Albanians. Sir Arthur Evans said that the Albanian fustanella of the female peasants (worn over and above the Slavonic apron) living near the modern Bosnian-Montenegrin borders was a preserved Illyrian element among the local Slavic-speaking populations.

Some scholars have hypothesised that the Illyrian kilt became the original pattern of Roman military dress. Baron Franz Nopcsa further theorized that the Celtic kilt emerged after the Albanian kilt was introduced to the Celts in Britain by the Roman legions.

Some scholars have suggested a Roman origin, relating the fustanella to the statues of Roman emperors wearing knee-length pleated tunics. According to a variant of this view, with the expansion of the Romans to colder climates in central and northwestern Europe, more folds would be added to provide greater warmth; according to another variant of this view by folklorist Ioanna Papantoniou, the fustanella ultimately originated from the Celtic kilt, as viewed by the Roman legions, serving as the original prototype.

Concerning the kilts, they are generally regarded as not being worn by Celtic warriors of Roman times and as being introduced in the Scottish Highlands c. 16th Century AD.

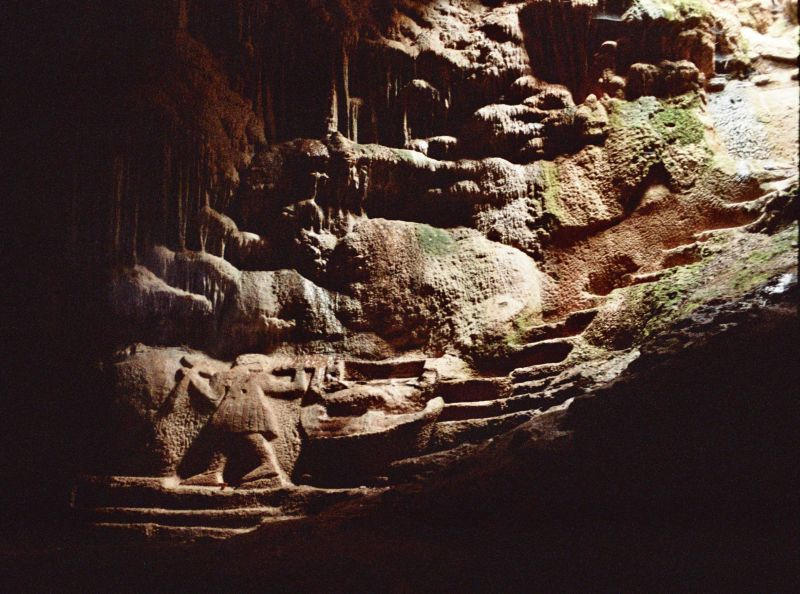
A relief circa 5th-century BC depicting Archedemus the Nympholept, the builder of the sanctuary of Vari Cave in Attica, Greece, wearing a chiton, interpreted as being tied in folds in the waist like a fustanella.

Other scholars have hypothesised that the fustanella was derived from a series of ancient Greek garments such as the chiton (or tunic) and the chitonium (or short military tunic). This hypothesis involves a link to an ancient statue (3rd century BC) located in the area around the Acropolis in Athens. However, no ancient Greek clothing has survived to confirm that the origins of the fustanella are in the pleated garments or chitons worn by men in Classical Athens.

In the Byzantine Empire, a pleated skirt known as the podea (Greek: ποδέα) was worn. The wearer of the podea was either associated with a typical hero or an Akritic warrior and can be found in 12th-century finds attributed to Emperor Manuel I Komnenos (r. 1143–1180).

== Usage ==
=== Albania ===
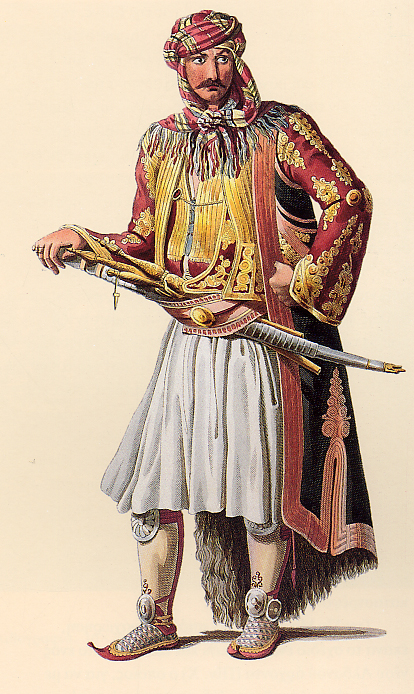
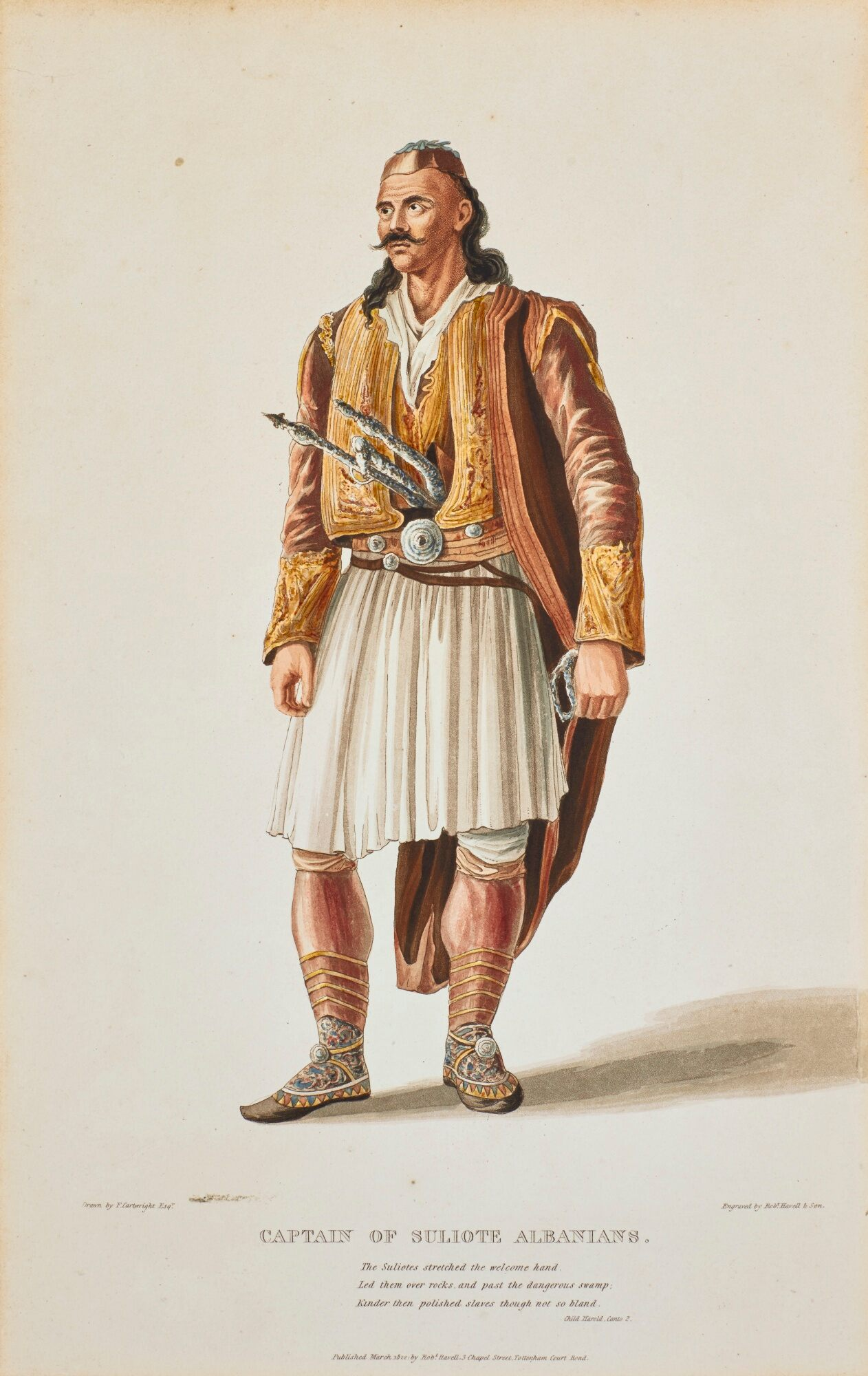
Janissary from Janina (left), Captain of Suliote Albanians (right). Both dating to the 1810s, the engravings show the Albanian traditional warrior costume, preferred by Albanian clan chiefs and high-ranking officers in the Ottoman Empire and the Ionian Islands during the early 19th century.

In Albanian territories the fustanella was used centuries before Ottoman rule. A fustanella is depicted on a 13th-century proto-maiolica pottery fragment from Durrës. A 14th-century document (1335) listing a series of items including a fustanum (a cloth made of cotton), which were confiscated from a sailor at the port of the Drin River in the Skadar Lake region of Albania. In the late Byzantine period and the early Ottoman period southern Albanians migrated in Greece and in southern Italy, bringing with them their own custom, language and clothing, which included the fustanella garment. In the 19th century the usage of the fustanella stretched through all Albanian inhabited lands, and it had become the ethnic costume characteristic of the Albanian men.

The Albanian traditional costume with fustanella had identified the special troops that Albanians constituted within the Ottoman Empire, whose military prowess became renowned, especially in the era of the Ottoman Albanian pashas Ali of Yanina and Muhammad Ali of Egypt. In the Napoleonic era (1799–1815) the Albanian mercenary troops (Muslim Arnaut), whose traditional costume included the fustanella, were counted among the paid Turkish government troops, along with the Janissary troops. After the disbandment of Janissary corps in 1826, the Albanian troops were employed in various armies as frontier battalions when the new Mansure Army was established within the Ottoman army by Mahmud II. In the 1820s the authorities of the Ottoman Provincial Governments overall preferred Arnaut mercenary troops over any of the standing army troops.

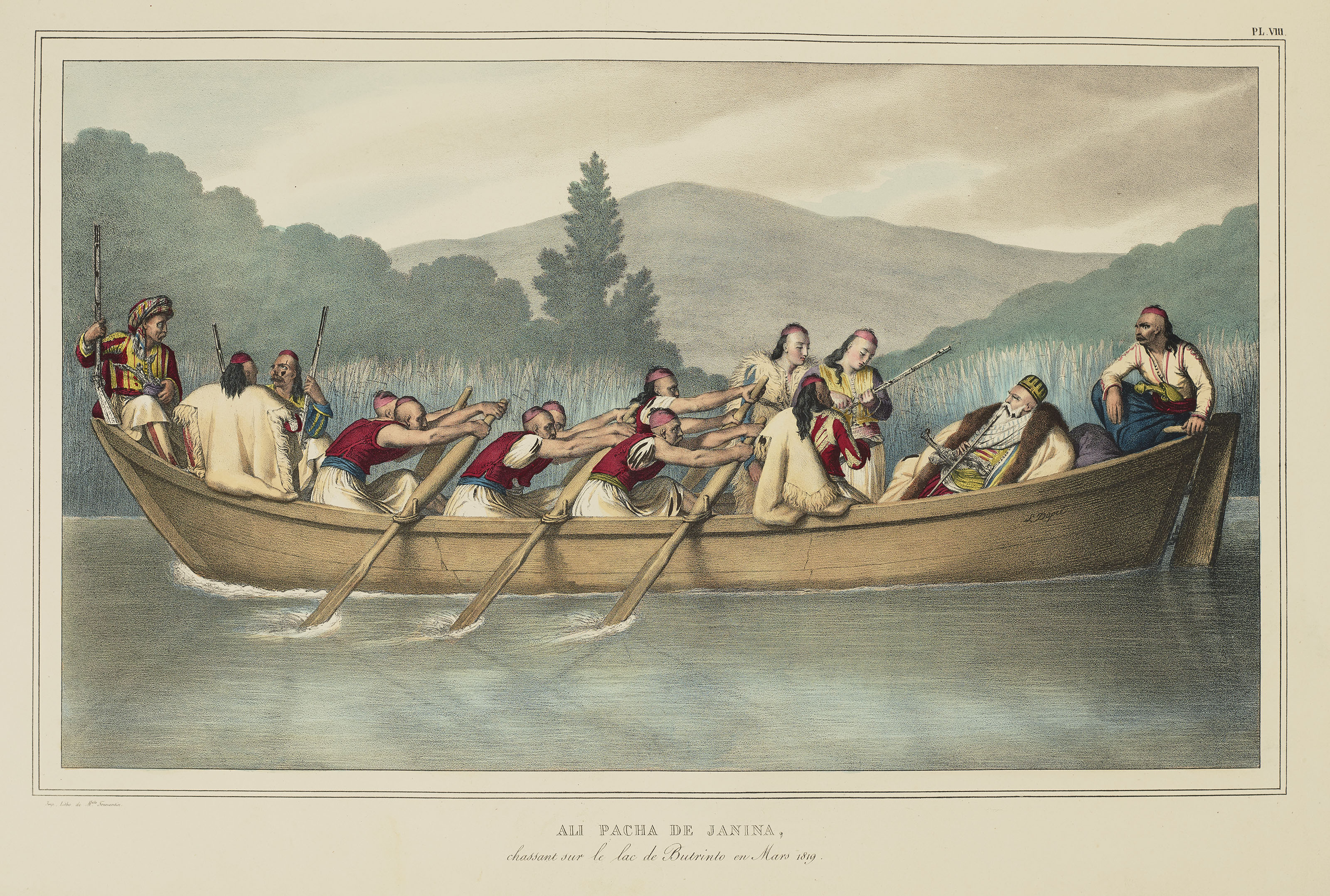
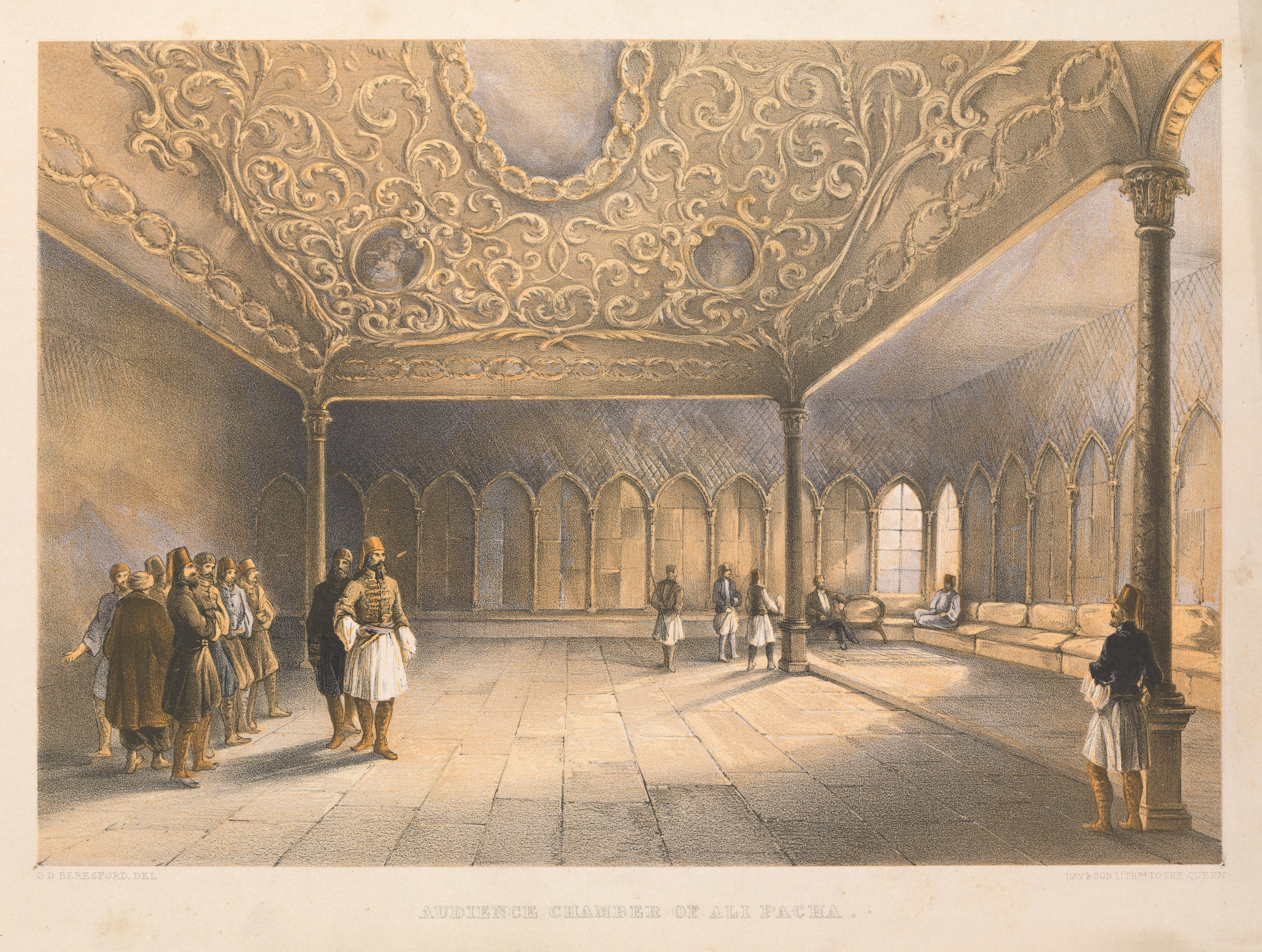
Ali Pasha of Janina hunting in the lake of Butrint in March 1819 by Louis Dupré (1825) (top). Audience chamber of Ali Pacha in Janina, Albania (subsequently Greece), c. 1800, by George de la Poer Beresford, published in 1855 (bottom).

During the late 18th and early 19th centuries Albanian warriors wore their traditional costume with fustanella in the Kingdom of Naples and the Ionian Islands. Between 1807 and 1814 it was worn by the men of the Albanian Regiment of the French army, which consisted mainly of Albanian warriors. In the 1810s, the Albanian warrior dress was officially adopted as the standardised military uniform of the 1st Regiment Greek Light Infantry of the British army, which consisted mainly of Albanians and Greeks.

The fustanella was regarded by foreign scholars and travellers as a typical Albanian costume, characterizing the Albanians from the standpoint of dress for many centuries, especially in the 18th and 19th centuries. In 1805 William Martin Leake reported that it was worn by the men at arms of Albanian beys in the Morea, and that "The Albanian dress is daily becoming more customary, both in the Morea and in the rest of Greece". In 1807 Leake reported that the officials of the Albanian ruler Ali Pasha of Yanina, including his sons, were dressed according to the Albanian tradition. In 1809–1810, within the area of contemporary southern Albania and northwestern Greece, British traveller John Cam Hobhouse noticed that when traveling from the Greek-speaking area (region south of Delvinaki) into the Albanian-speaking area (to the direction of Gjirokastër and its surrounding environs), apart from different languages a change of clothing occurred. Those Albanian speakers wore the Kamisa shirt and kilt, while Greek speakers wore woolen brogues.

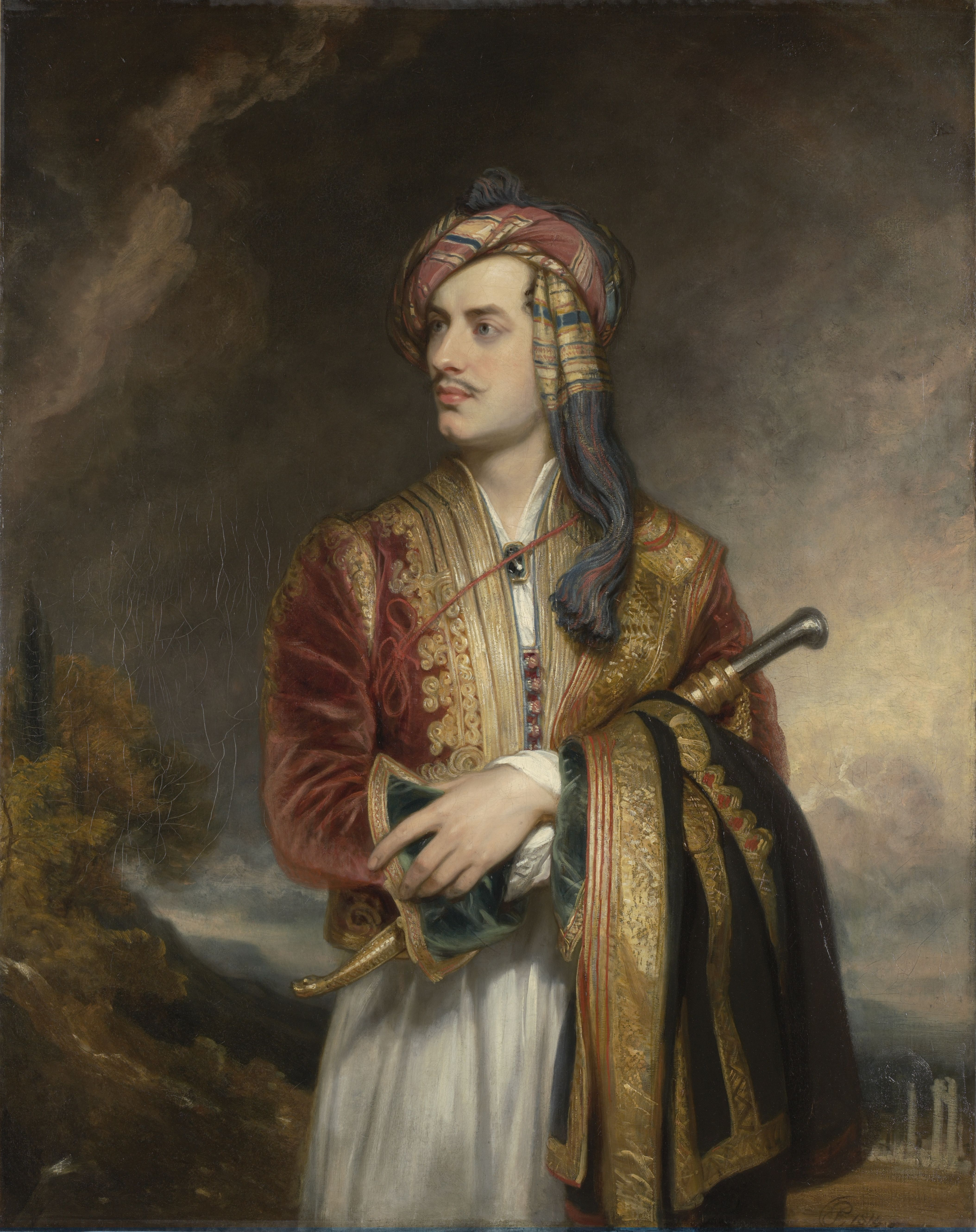
Lord Byron in Albanian Dress (1813) by Thomas Phillips. Byron purchased this dress when he arrived in Albania in 1809.

In the early 19th century, other British travellers within the region noticed the Albanian costume, in particular in 1809 Lord Byron celebrated and described it as "the most magnificent in the world, consisting of long, white kilt, gold-worked cloak, crimson velvet gold laced jacket and waist-coat, silver mounted pistols and daggers". The renowned Albanian clothes were not official uniforms adorned with insignia, but traditional costumes with small differences depending on the regional location or personal preferences of the wearer. After its celebration and description by Byron, who was the most influential Philhellene of the time, the Albanian traditional warrior costume became a principal visual symbol of Philhellenism in the 1820s, appearing in the widespread romantic iconography of klepht and armatole warriors of the Greek revolution. The Albanian traditional costume with fustanella was greatly favoured among the Balkan peoples, and it was imitated by many other peoples. Its spread among other neighbouring peoples such as the Greeks, and even the Turks, is documented by the historians of the time.

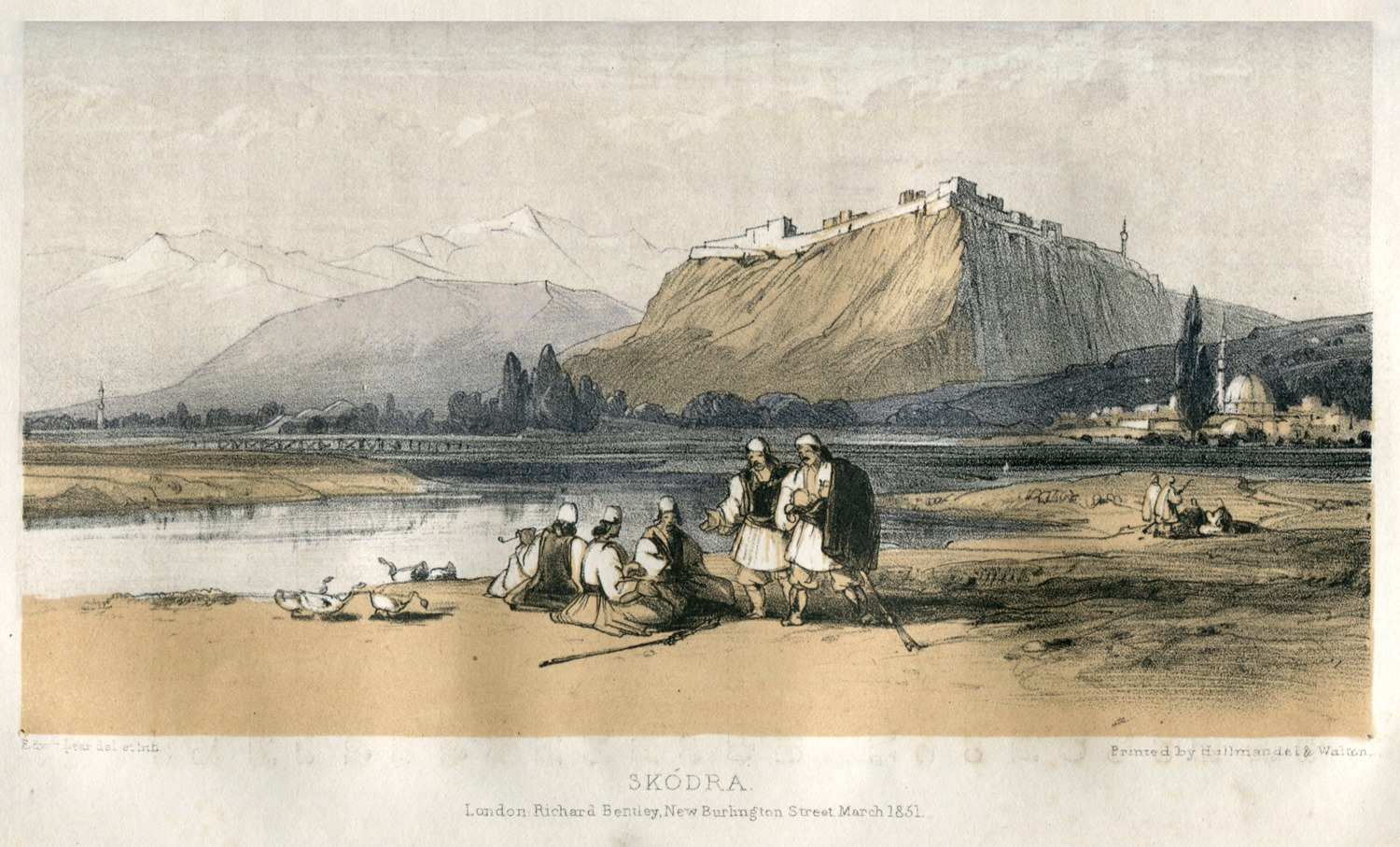
Albanians in Shkodër depicted by Edward Lear, 4 October 1848.

In 1848–1849, British painter Edward Lear traveling within the area of contemporary Albania observed that the fustanella was for Albanians a characteristic national costume. Other artists visiting southern Albania in mid-19th century depicted landscapes with Albanians in traditional costume with fustanella, such as Henry Cook and George de la Poer Beresford.

During the 19th century the use of the fustanella was worn over tight fitting tirq pants amongst male Albanian Ghegs by village groups of the Malësorë or highlanders of the Kelmend, Berisha, Shala and Hoti tribes. They reserved use of the fustanella for elites during important and formal occasions such as dispute resolutions, election of local tribal representatives and allegiance declarations. During the 1920s, the fustanella began to go out of fashion among Tosks being replaced with Western style clothing made by local tailors.

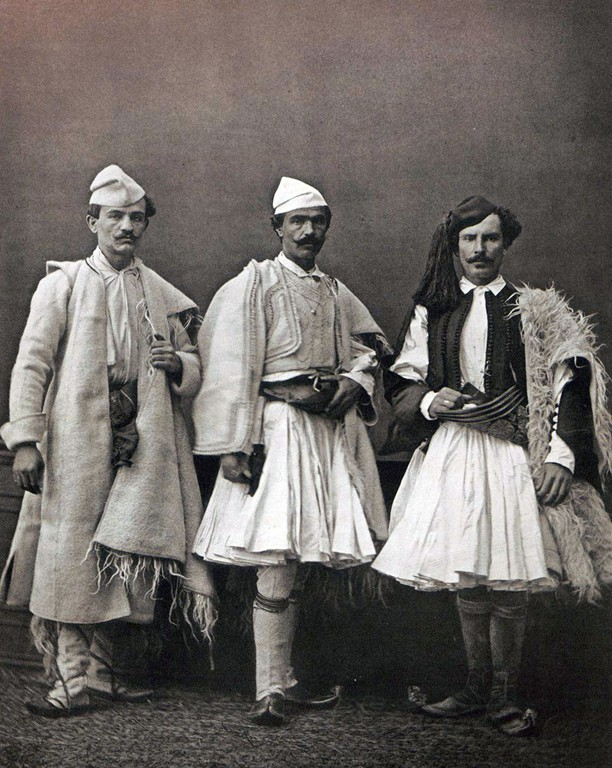
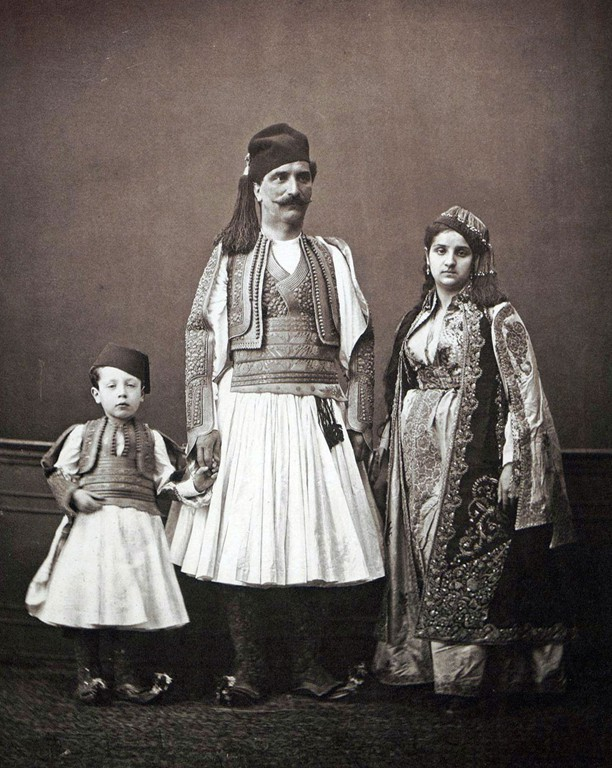
Albanian traditional costumes from Yanina in 1873, from left to right: peasant, lower-class, middle-class; upper-class family.

The Albanian fustanella has around sixty pleats, or usually a moderate number. It is made of heavy home-woven linen cloth. Historically, the skirt was long enough to cover the whole thigh (knee included), leaving only the lower leg exposed. It was usually worn by wealthy Albanians who would also expose an ornamented yataghan on the side and a pair of pistols with long-chiseled silver handles in the belt. The general custom in Albania was to dip the white skirts in melted sheep-fat for the double purpose of making them waterproof and less visible at a distance. Usually, this was done by the men-at-arms (called in Albanian trima). After being removed from the cauldron, the skirts were hung up to dry and then pressed with cold irons so as to create the pleats. They then had a dull gray appearance but were not dirty by any means.

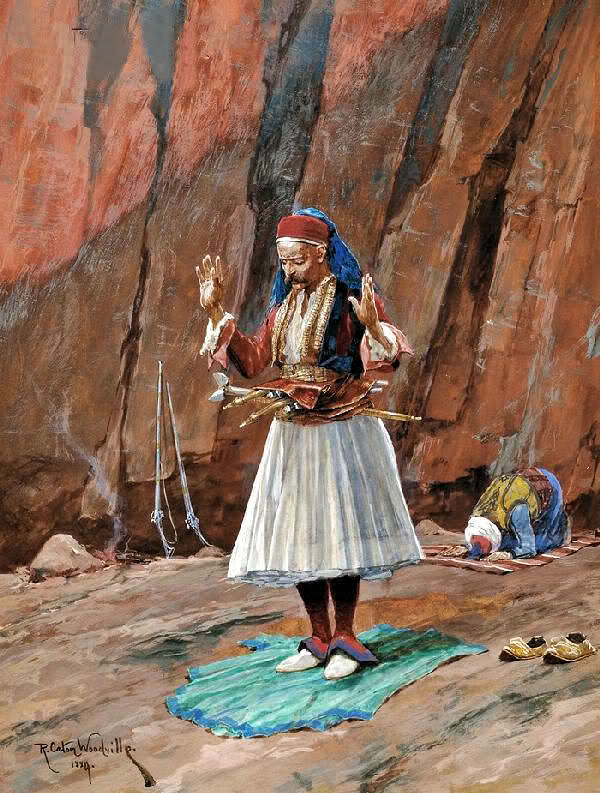
Albanian Frontier Guards at Prayer (1889) by Richard Caton Woodville Jr. Costume version that was also worn by Shkodran Albanian warriors in the Ottoman Mansure Army, established in 1826.

The jacket, worn with the fustanella in the Albanian costume, has a free armhole to allow for the passage of the arm, while the sleeves, attached only on the upper part of the shoulders, are thrown back. The sleeves are not usually worn even though the wearer has the option of putting them on. There are three types of footwear that complement the fustanella: 1) the kundra, which are black shoes with a metal buckle, 2) the sholla, which are sandals with leather thongs tied around a few inches above the ankle, 3) the opinga, which is a soft leather shoe, with turned-up points, which, when intended for children, are surmounted with a pompon of black or red wool.

In 1914, the newly formed Greek armed forces of the Autonomous Republic of Northern Epirus (1913–1914) initially did not have their own military uniforms, but later the enlisted men adopted Evzone uniforms. Nowadays among the Greek population in southern Albania, a sigouni, a sleeveless coat made of thick white wool, is worn over the fustanella in the regions of Dropull and Tepelenë.

=== Bulgaria ===
The Albanian traditional warrior costume with fustanella spread among Bulgarians, about two decades after it was dressed by the revolutionaries of the Greek War of Independence in the 1820s, when its notoriety as a symbol of male courage and heroism expanded across the region. The Albanian-Greek attire became popular particularly among young men who wanted to take a picture in a heroic pose, although not being themselves involved in fights for independence.

=== Egypt ===
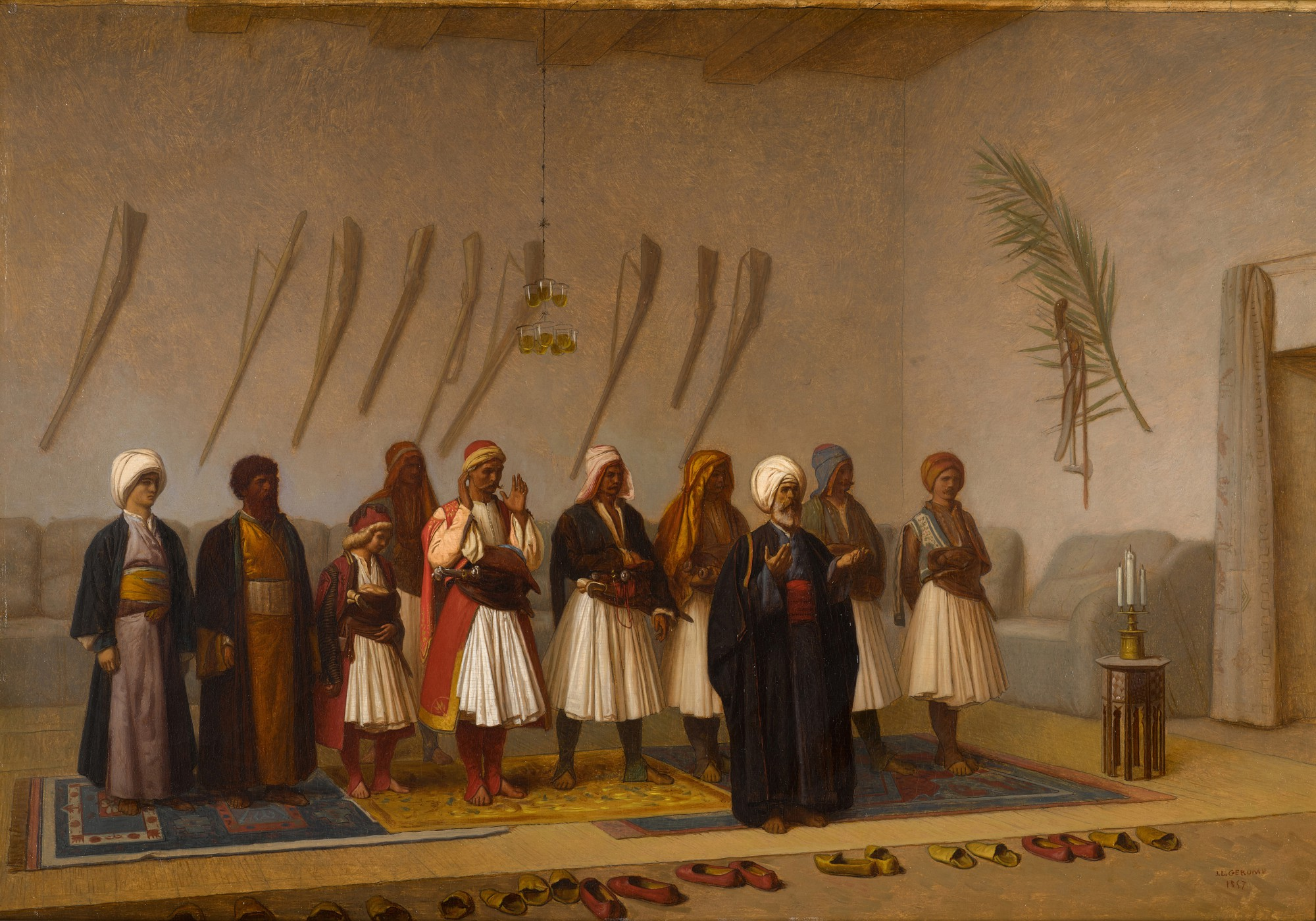
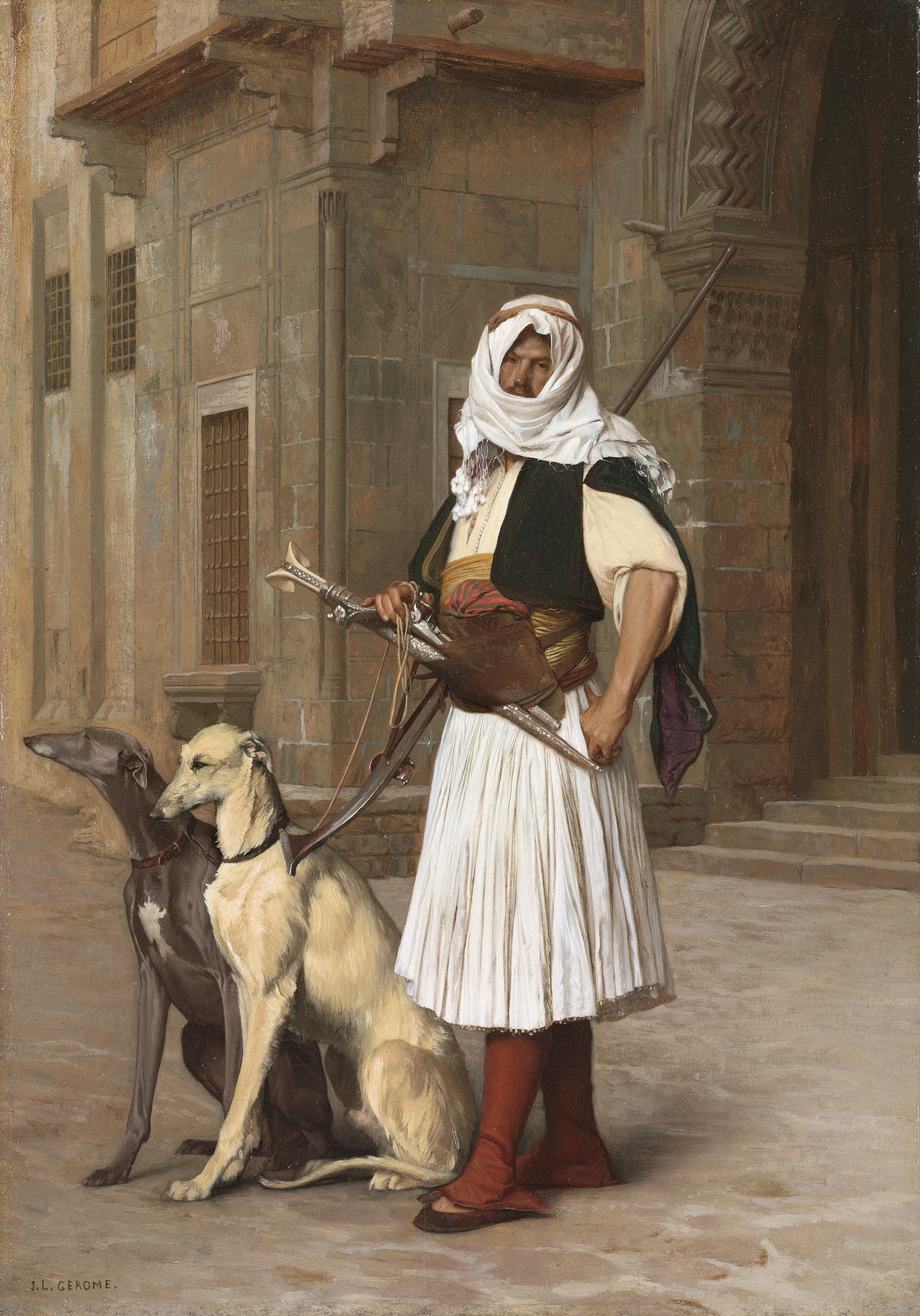
Prayer in the house of an Arnaut chief (1857) on the left, and Arnaut and two Whippets (1867) on the right, by Jean-Léon Gérôme, show Albanians wearing the fustanella in Egypt.

The sizeable Albanian guards and janissary troops who settled on the banks of the Nile during the early rule of Mehmed Ali' dynasty were noted for their swagger, their weapons and their costumes, particularly for the pleats of their typical white fustanellas. Those costumes played a major role in Jean-Léon Gérôme's paintings.

Albanian volunteers and mounted infantry were called Arnauts in Egypt, and they were greatly valued in the Egyptian Army, especially for their traditional role as skirmishers, experts of mountain fighting, patrolling and bodyguard units. Contemporary commentators about their dress described their fustanella as "a white many folded" and "a white linen petticoat of enormous size, hanging in numberless plaits from the waist to the knee".

In the 1930s the fustanella continued to characterise Albanian guards in Egypt, as witnessed by Egyptian scholar Magdi Wahba around the department stores in Cairo.

=== Greece ===
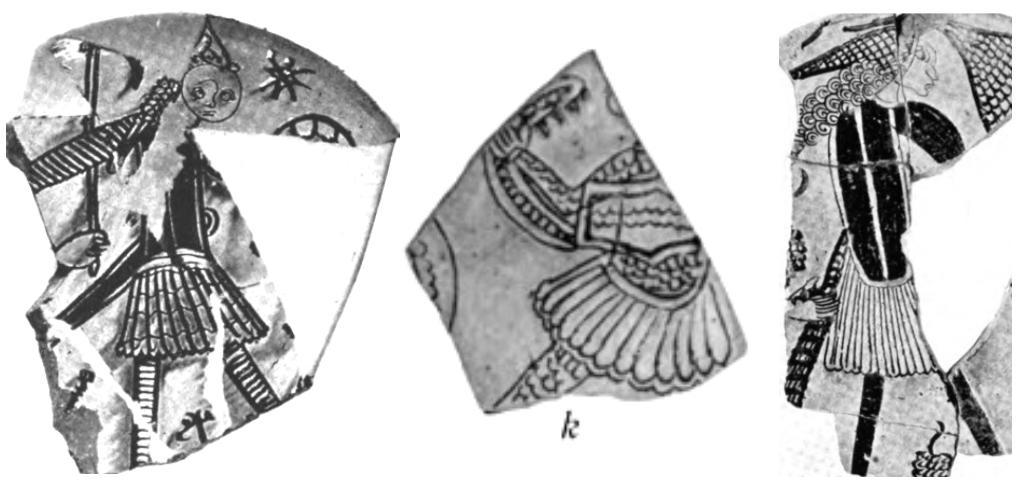
Sgraffito pottery fragments from the 12th century showing Greek warriors thought to be wearing the fustanella, from Corinth , Greece.

It has been suggested that the fustanella was already in common use in Greek lands as early as the 12th century. Byzantine warriors, in particular the Akritai, wearing fustanella, are depicted in contemporary Byzantine art. On Byzantine pottery sherds from Greece, Cyprus, and Chersonesus, warriors are shown bearing weapons and wearing the heavy pleated fustanella. This is also confirmed by the Medieval Greek acritic songs of the 12th century; it has been suggested that 11th-century illuminated manuscripts of the songs served as prototypes for later depictions. The garment is also depicted on early 14th-century frescoes in the church of Saint Nicholas Orphanos in Thessaloniki, and the church of Holy Cross of Agiasmati in Cyprus. The full-pleated fustanella was worn by the Byzantine Akritic warriors originally as a military outfit, and seems to have been reserved for people of importance. It was frequently worn in conjunction with bows, swords, or battle-axes and frequently shown covered with a jointed corselet, or with a vest of chain mail. Being a suitable garment for guerrilla mountain units, it might have been worn by the klephts of the Greek Revolution of 1821–1830 for the same reason it would have been worn by the akritai warriors of the Byzantine era earlier.

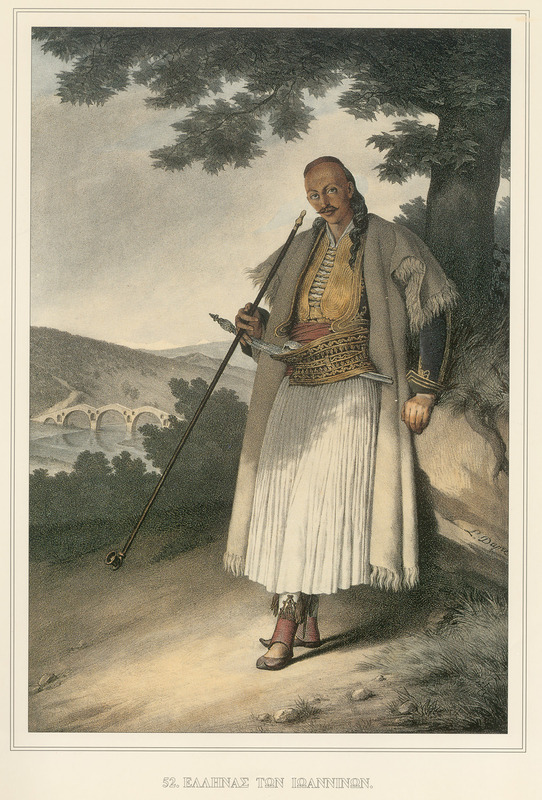
Un Grec de Janina (1827) by Lous Dupré, originally published in 1825 with the title Albanais au service d'Ali Pacha. The subject was encountered by Dupré in 1820 and described by him as a young Albanian lord who impressed him by his politeness, dexterity, noble brow and proud look, as well as his costume and weapons.

Southern Albanians introduced their traditional costume with fustanella when they migrated in territories of present-day Greece, subsequently becoming part of the national dress of Greece as a consequence of their settlement in the region. The Albanian warrior dress with fustanella spread among armed irregulars – klephts and armatoles – in the pre-revolutionary period, and was worn by revolutionary fighters during the Greek War of Independence. In the early 19th century, the costume's popularity rose among the Greek population. During the era of post-independence Greece, parts of Greek society such as townspeople shed their Turkish-style clothing and adopted the fustanella which symbolised solidarity with new Greek democracy. Philhellene enthusiasm for the fustanella survived knowledge of its Albanian origins. It became difficult thereafter to distinguish the fustanella as clothing worn by male Arvanites from clothing worn by wider parts of Greek society. Its popularity in the Morea (Peloponnese) was attributed to the influence of the Albanian community of Hydra and other Albanian settlements in the area. The Hydriotes however could not have played a significant role in its development since they did not wear the fustanella, but similar costumes to the other islanders. In other regions of Greece the popularity of the fustanella was attributed to the elevation of Albanians as an Ottoman ruling class such as Ali Pasha, the semi-independent ruler of the Pashalik of Yanina. In those areas, its lightweight design and manageability in comparison to the clothing of the Greek upper classes of the era also made it fashionable amongst them in adopting the fustanella.

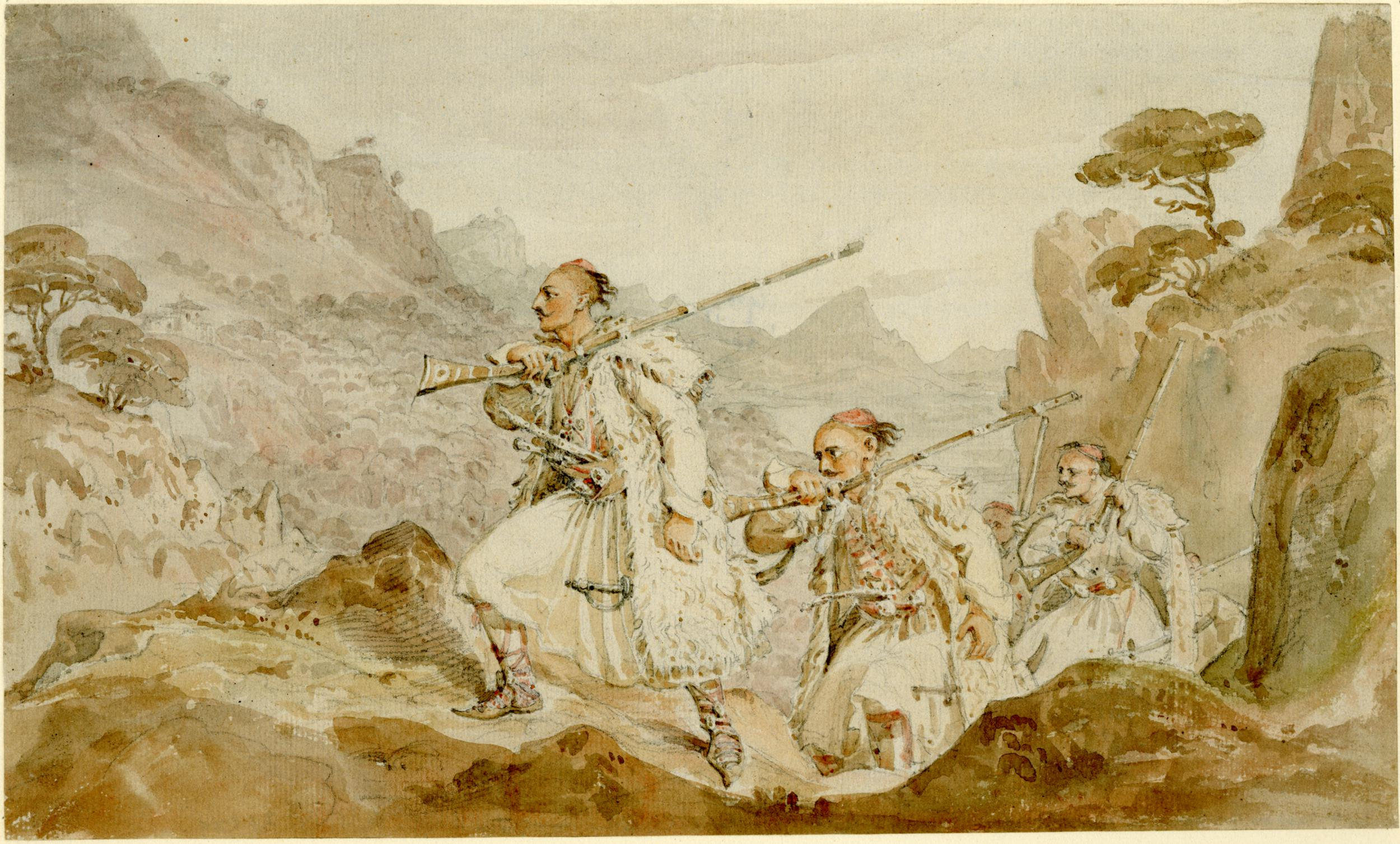
Albanian palikars in pursuit of an enemy (1813-4). Watercolour by Charles Robert Cockerell showing Souliot warriors wearing their traditional costume.

The Albanian-style costume with fustanella was used in the Ionian Islands by the Albanian warriors, initially within an Albanian militia that was raised by the Russians in 1799, and which was transferred to the French in 1807, after the recovering of the Ionian Islands. On 12 October 1807 Napoleon also approved the recruitment of roughly 3,000 Albanians who had moved to the Ionian Islands, for the most part refugees fleeing the Albanian coast because of the harsh authority of the Ottoman Albanian ruler Ali Pasha of Janina. On 12 December 1807 they were organized as the Albanian Regiment. Local Greeks, Italians and Dalmatians were additionally recruited, however the regiment never achieved its official establishment of 3,254.

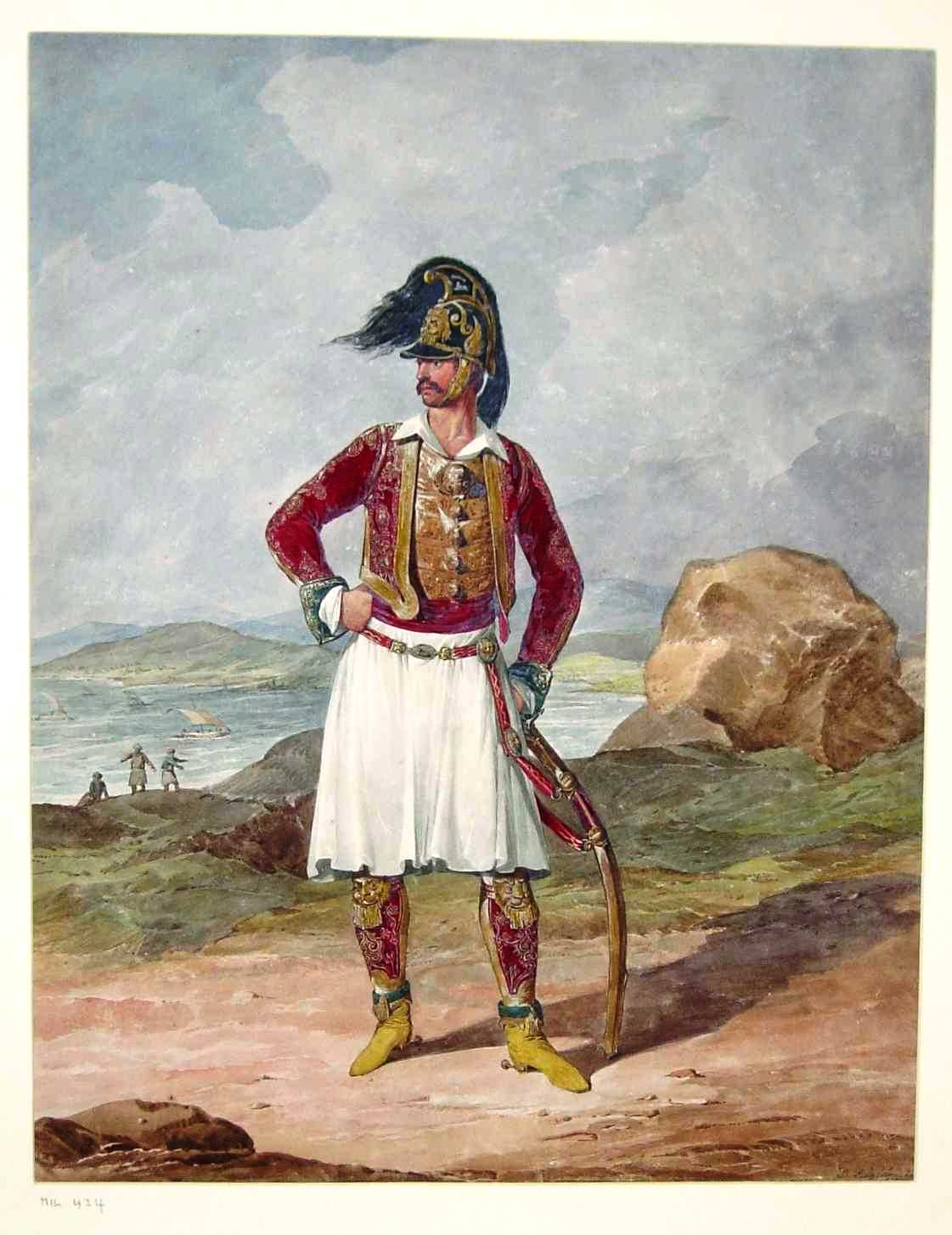
Richard Church, first commander of the 1st Regiment Greek Light Infantry of the British army, wearing the regimental uniform based on the Albanian traditional warrior costume and a dragoon helmet, 1813.

The first time the fustanella was worn as part of a standardised military uniform in territories of present-day Greece was in 1810 in the British regiment of Zakynthos, which consisted mainly of Albanians and Greeks. The men of the regiment were reported as wearing "Albanian dress"; their orders stated "clothing and accoutrements were to be made in the Albanian fashion". Enlisted men wore red jackets with yellow cuffs, facings, and trim; for the officers, these were gold and white, over a white shirt, foustanella, breeches and stockings.

In the Peloponnese, the Greeks of Mani did not traditionally wear the fustanella, they used to dress voluminous trousers. Written evidence that some version of the Albanian costume were in use in the Pelopponese was provided by William Martin Leake in March 1805, when he met a local Albanian Bey accompanied by Albanian soldiers. Leake also wrote about the Albanian costume during a visit to Hassan Bey, governor of Monemvasia, reporting that "The Albanian dress is daily becoming more customary, both in the Morea and in the rest of Greece; in the latter from the great increase of the Albanian power; in the Morea, probably in consequence of the prosperity of Ydhra, which is an Albanian colony, and of the settlements of Albanian peasantry that have been made in some parts of the Morea, particularly Argolis, as well as in the neighbouring provinces of Attica and Boeotia."

Following the Greek independence, fustanella and associated embroidered waistcoats and jackets that were worn by the revolutionary fighters were adopted by the nascent Greek army. In 1835, it was proclaimed the official court costume by King Otto of Greece and eventually it became the Greek national dress.

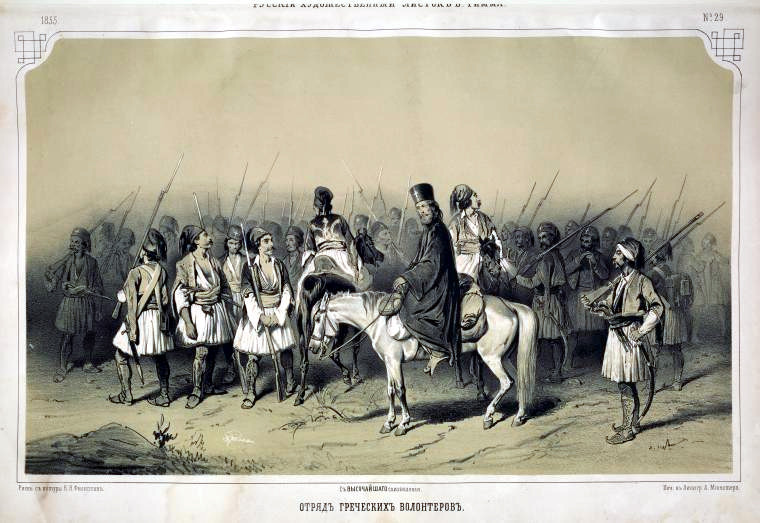
Detachment of Greek Volunteers (1855) by Vasily Timm, during the Crimean War (1853–1856).

During the reign of King Otto (1832–1862), the fustanella was worn by the king, the royal court and the military, while it became a service uniform imposed on government officials to wear even when abroad. In that period the dress system in Greece evolved, and most of the Greeks were increasingly wearing European garments, while traditional clothing was still preserved in villages. The uniform with the typical fustanella was mainly used in the army as well as on ceremonial events and feasts.

In the Crimean War (1853–1856), fustanella was worn by volunteers serving in the Greek Volunteer Legion. In 1855, it was insisted that the Greek volunteers should abandon the fustanella and adopt uniforms that were similar to the Russian ones; arguing that the costume of the Greeks was not suitable for military conditions. Aristidis Chrisovergis, one of the commanders, strongly opposed this and refused to take off the fustanella.

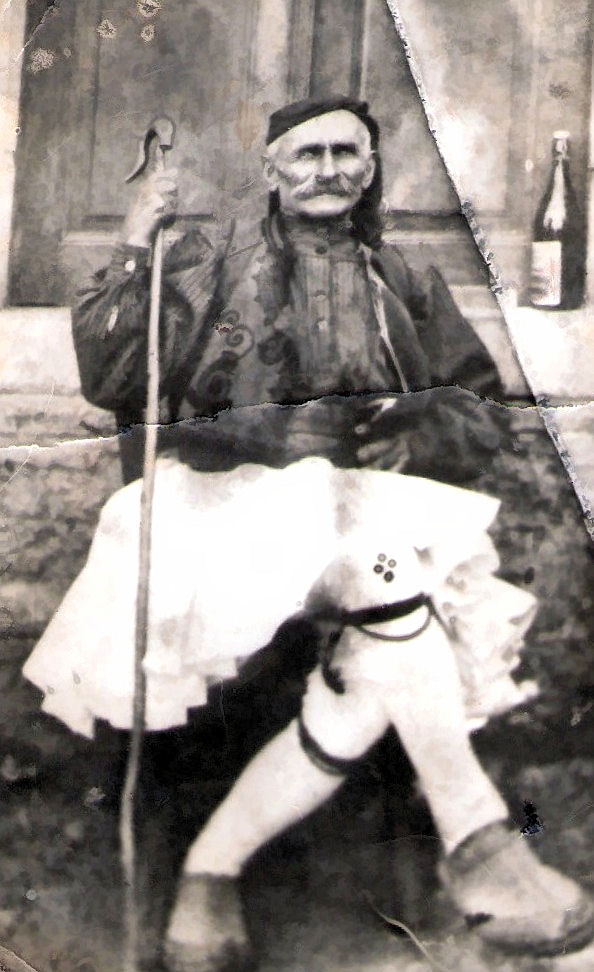
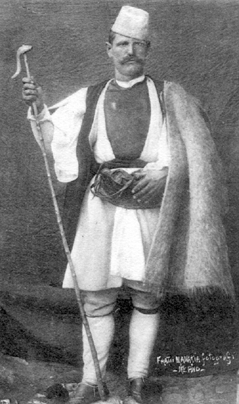
An old man in Arcadia, Greece (left). Aromanian shepherd in traditional clothes, early 1900s, Manaki Brothers Archive (right).

Greek villagers of Albanian origin continued to wear the fustanella or the poukamiso (an elongated shirt) on a daily basis until the 20th century. Of the Roumeliotes, the nomadic Greek-speaking Sarakatsani pastoralists wore either trousers or the fustanella, depending on the local tradition. The Aromanians, a Latin-speaking people who lived within Greece also wore the fustanella or trousers depending on the region.

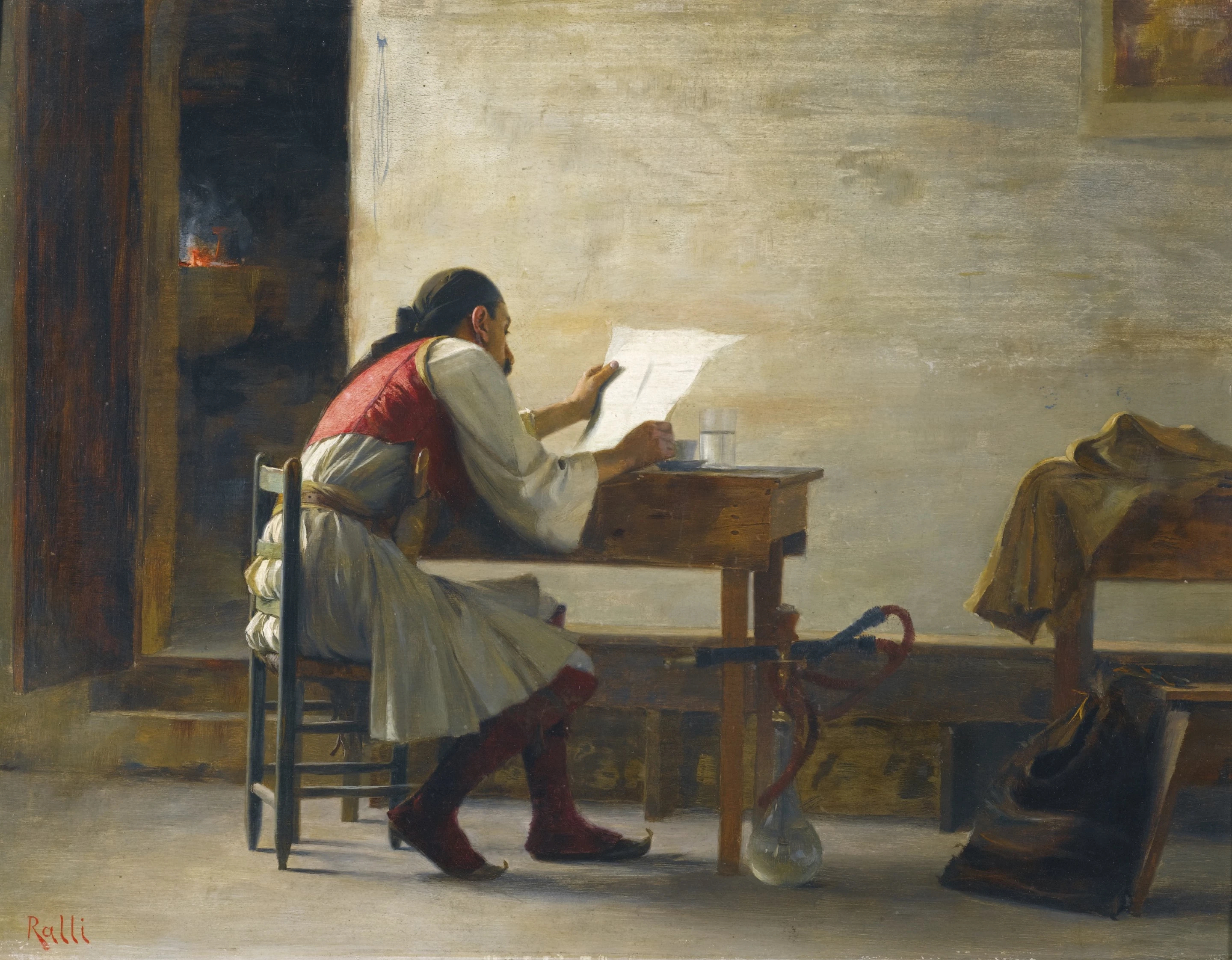
A Good Read by Théodore Jacques Ralli c. 1903, Greek man wearing fustanella

In terms of geographical spread, the fustanella never became part of the clothing worn in the Aegean islands, whereas in Crete it was associated with the heroes of the Greek War of Independence (1821) in local theatrical productions and seldom as a government uniform. The men of the Greek presidential guard, founded in 1868, wear the fustanella as part of their official dress. By the late 19th century, the popularity of the fustanella in Greece began to fade when Western-style clothing was introduced. The nineteenth-century Greek painter Théodore Jacques Ralli created paintings featuring subjects wearing traditional Greek fustanella between 1873 and 1909, memorialising the traditional Greek attire. Ralli's 1903 painting A Good Read is a good example of how the painter featured the fustanella in his works.

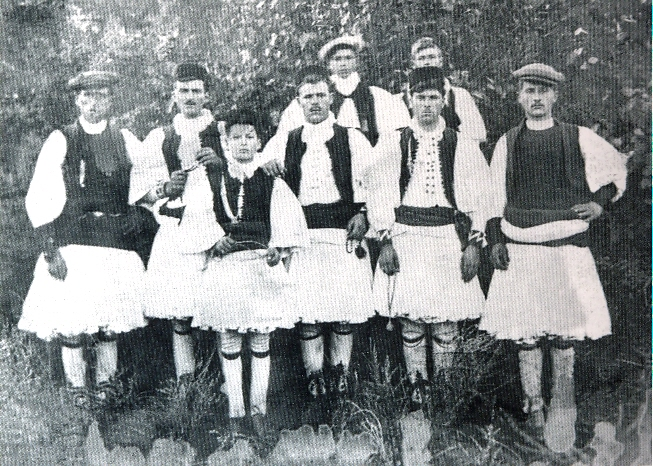
Sarakatsani men in Western Macedonia, Greece, 1935.

The fustanella film (or fustanella drama) was a popular genre in the Greek cinema from the 1910s to the 1960s. Some early films featuring Greek fustanella were the 1915 Greek agricultural-themed film Golfo and the 1929 film Astero. This genre emphasized on depictions of rural Greece and was focused on the differences between rural and urban Greece. In general it offered an idealized depiction of the Greek village, where the fustanella was a typical image. In Greece today, the garment is seen a relic of a past era with which most members of the younger generations do not identify.

The Greek fustanella differs from the Albanian fustanella in that the former garment has a higher number of pleats. For example, the "Bridegroom's coat", worn throughout the districts of Attica and Boeotia, was a type of Greek fustanella unique for its 200 pleats; a bride would purchase it as a wedding gift for her groom (if she could afford the garment). A fustanella is worn with a yileki (bolero), a mendani (waistcoat) and a fermeli (sleeveless coat). The selachi (leather belt) with gold or silver embroidery, is worn around the waist over the fustanella, in which the armatoloi and the klephts placed their arms.

During the 18th and early 19th centuries, the skirts hung below the knees and the hem of the garment was gathered together with garters while tucked into the boots to create a "bloused" effect. Later, during the Bavarian regency, the skirts were shortened to create a sort of billowy pantaloon that stopped above the knee; this garment was worn with hose, and either buskins or decorative clogs. This is the costume worn by the Evzones, light mountain troops of the Hellenic Army. Today it is still worn by the ceremonial Presidential Guard.

=== Italy ===
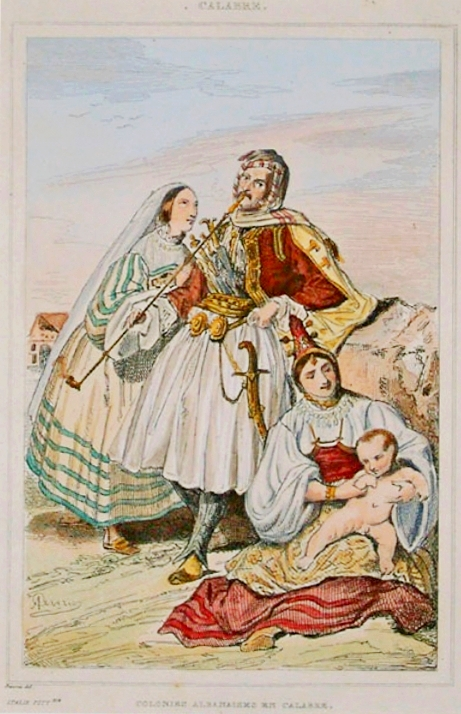
Albanian family in Calabria in the 1830s.

The fustanella has been in usage among the Arbëreshë people since their arrival in Italy.

In the late 18th century the Albanian traditional warrior costume with fustanella was worn by the Albanian troops in the Kingdom of Naples. The Albanian Regiments were disbanded in 1789, however they were restored in 1798 constituting the "Albanian Volunteer Hunters Battalion" (Italian: "Battaglione Cacciatori Volontari Albanesi"). In 1800 they merged into the Royal Macedonian Regiment (It. "Real Macedonia"), where soldiers were recruited from their homeland until 1812, when the Regiment was disbanded. In 1813 the 526 veterans were sent to their homeland. In 1815, King Ferdinand of Naples commissioned the British General Richard Church to reorganize the Royal Macedonian Regiment called "Macedonian Hunters" (It. "Cacciatori Macedoni") or "Royal Albanian" (It. "Real Albanese") or "Royal Hunters" (It. "Reali Cacciatori"). In 1818 the unit was incorporated into the "Foreign Regiment" (It. "Reggimento Esteri"), constituting in 1820 its 3rd Battalion that was called "Foreign Hunters" (It. "Cacciatori Estero"). It was disbanded on 6 July 1820 after the assassination attempt on King Ferdinand by the Arbëresh Agesilao Milani. Thereafter the exonerated soldiers were sent to their homeland.

The fustanella has been a symbol of economic wealth among Arbëreshë people. It is worn by Arbëreshë men during festivals.

=== North Macedonia ===
In North Macedonia, the fustanella was worn in the regions of Azot, Babuna, Gevgelija, the southern area of the South Morava, Ovče Pole, Lake Prespa, Skopska Blatija, and Tikveš. In that area, it is known as fustan, ajta, or toska. The use of the term toska could be attributed to the hypothesis that the costume was introduced to certain regions within Macedonia as a cultural borrowing from the Albanians of Toskëria (subregion of southern Albania).

=== Moldova and Wallachia ===
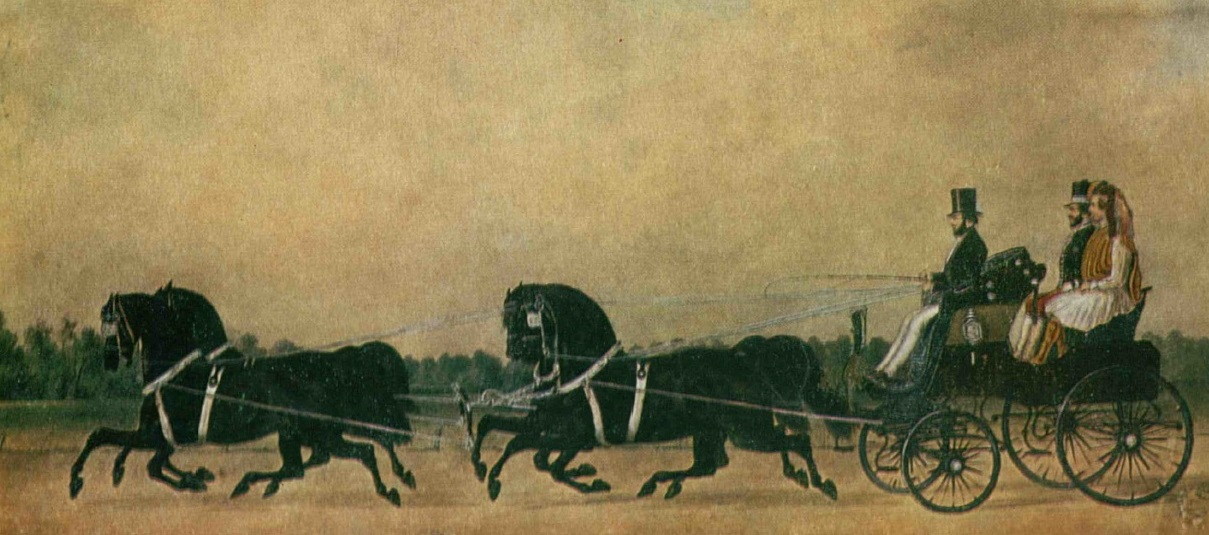
Begzade Grigore Gr. Ghica accompanied by an Albanian bodyguard in traditional costume, 1845.

In the 18th and 19th centuries many foreign travellers recorded that the bodyguards of the princely courts of Moldova and Wallachia were dressed with the Albanian fustanella.

=== Turkey ===
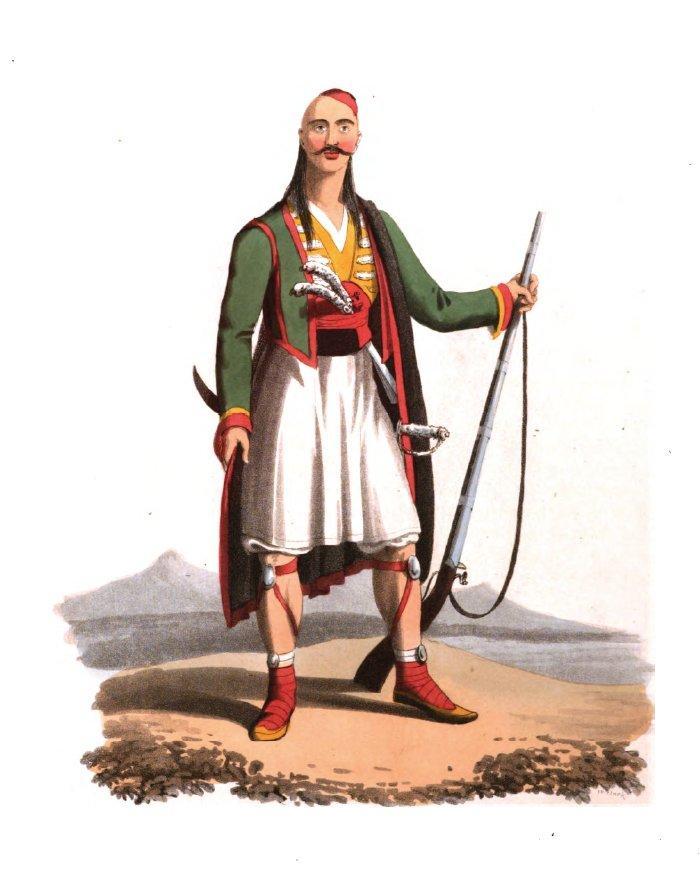
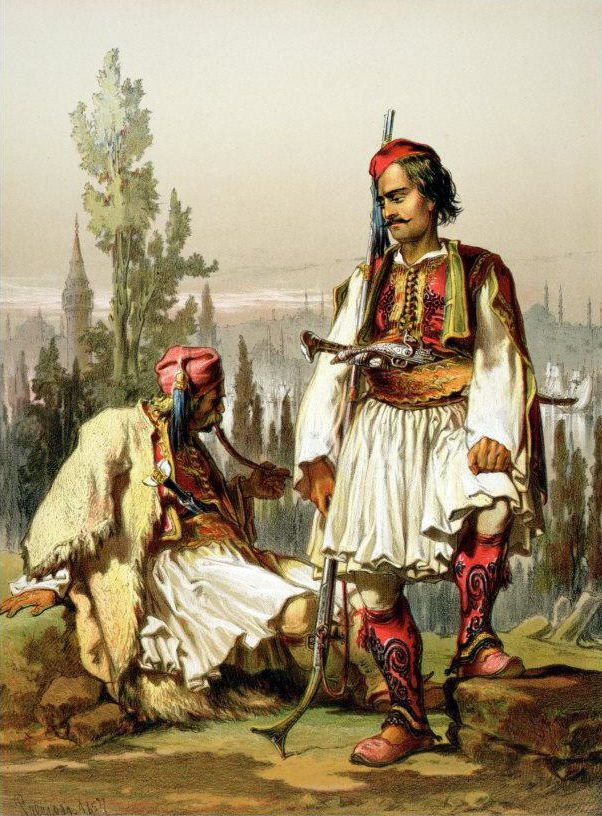
Albanian soldier in the Ottoman army, 1813 (left). Albanian soldiers in Constantinople, 1857 (right).

In the Napoleonic era (1799–1815) the Albanian mercenary troops (Muslim Arnaut), whose traditional costume included the fustanella, were counted among the paid Turkish Government Troops, along with the Janissary troops.

In 1808 Albanian Troops of Bayraktar Mustafa Pasha marched beside the new Sultan Mahmud II along Divan Yolu, the Imperial Road that led to the Imperial Council from Constantinople, following the Sultan's Sword Girding.

In the 1820s the authorities of the Ottoman Provincial Governments overall preferred Arnaut mercenary troops over any of the standing army troops. After 1826 these Albanian troops were employed in various armies as frontier battalions when the new Mansure Army was established within the Ottoman army by Mahmud II.

In the 19th century Albanian warriors found immediate employment remarkably in Istanbul, hired as guards of foreign embassies and the homes of the wealthy. They wore their traditional dress with fustanella, which evolved from an untidy costume into a formal uniform that exhibited the status of their employers.

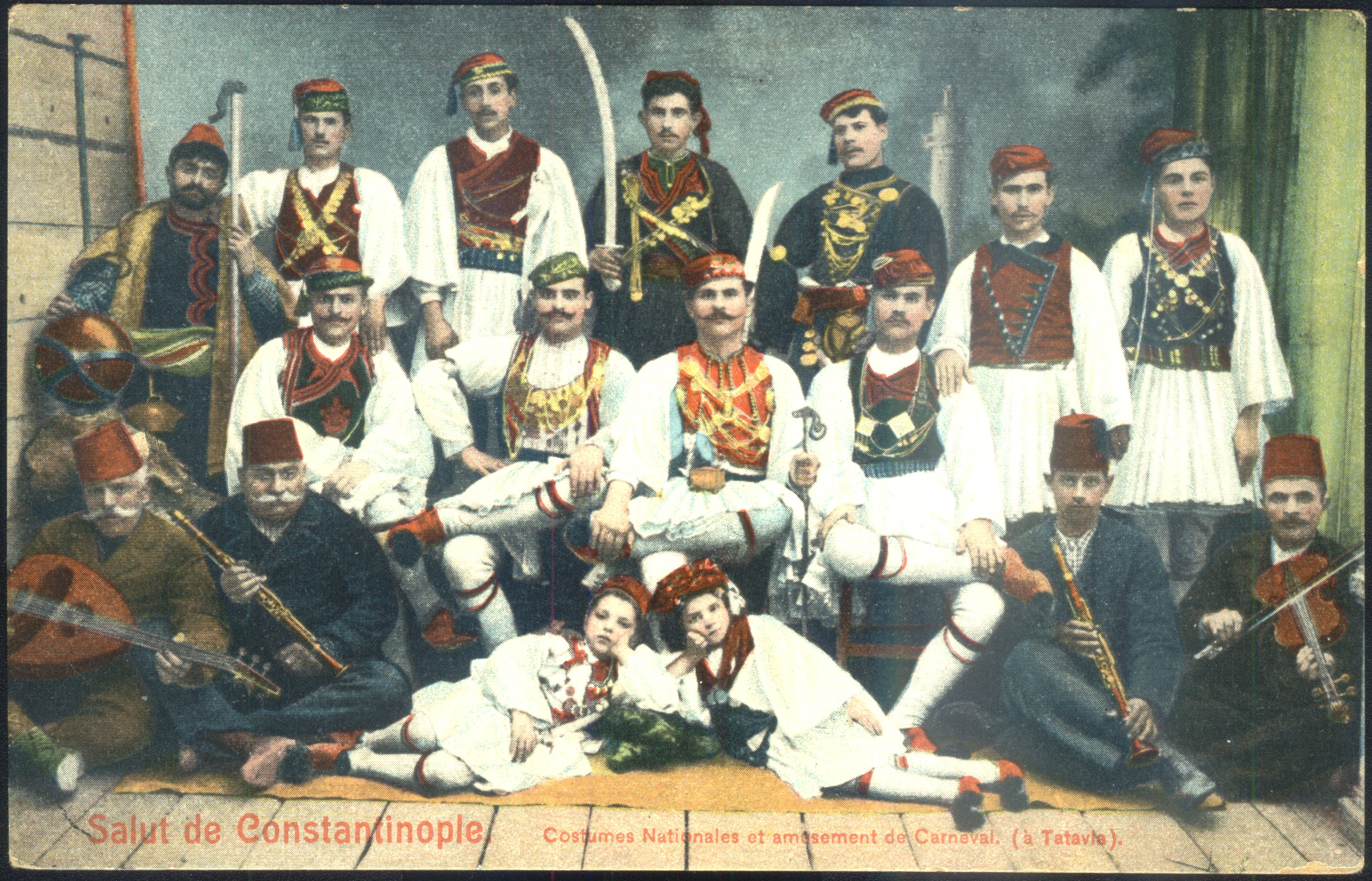
Greek men during the Baklahorani carnival in Istanbul, early 20th century

In the Baklahorani annual carnival of the Greek community in Istanbul the traditional fustanella was among the popular costumes worn by the Greek youth.

=== United States ===
In the United States, the fustanella is identified with Albanian and Greek populations. It can be frequently seen in Albanian and Greek folk festivals and parades across the country.

== See also ==
- Kilt
- Lava-lava
- Sarong
- Medieval armour
