= Michael Doesn't Have Any Change =

1926 Greek silent film

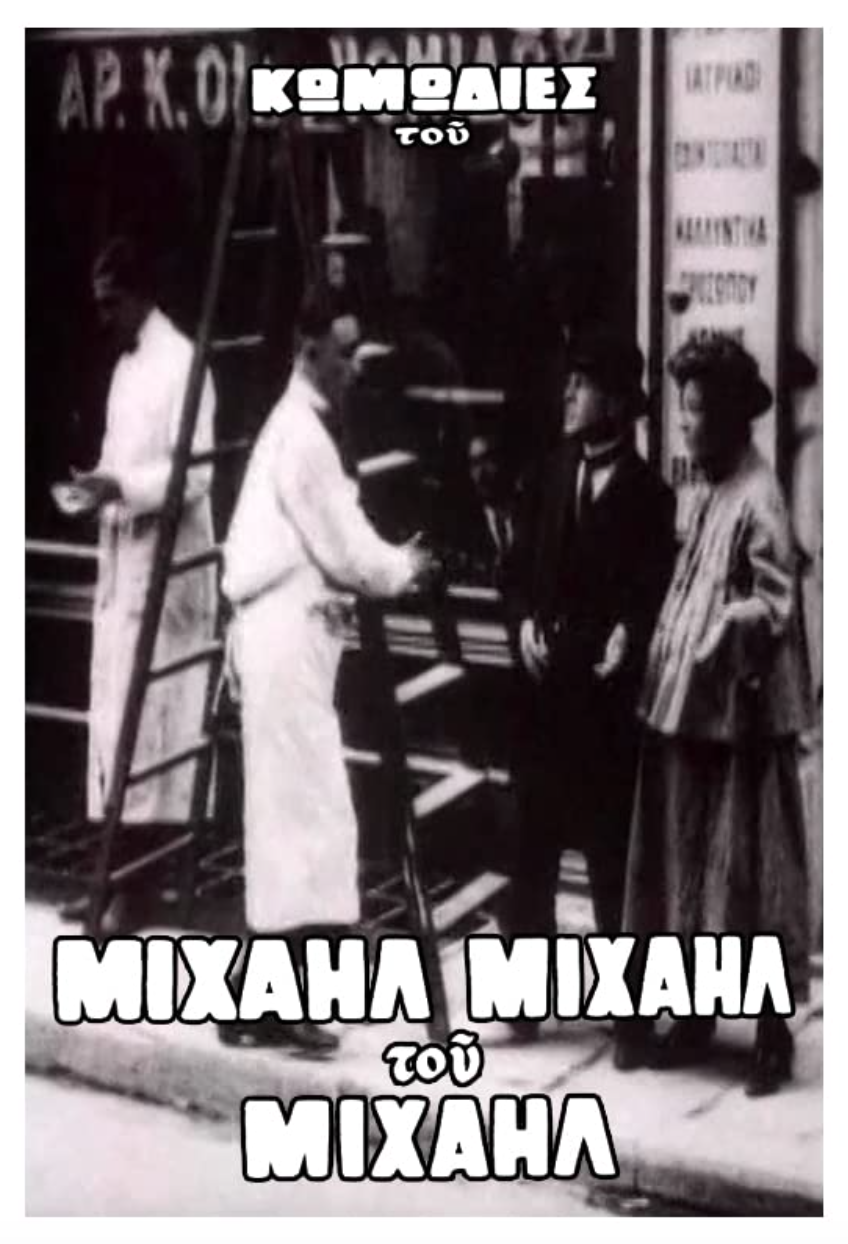
- Theatrical Poster
- Directed by: Lykourgos Kalapothakis
- Screenplay by: Michael Michael
- Based on: The Michael Comedy Series
- Starring: Micheal Micheal; Concetta Moschou; Emmanouil Tzanetis; Anna Roussou; Zaza Brillanti
- Cinematography: Joseph Hepp
- Release date: 2 May 1926
- Running time: 1 reel 11-15 minutes
- Country: Greece
- Languages: Silent film; Greek intertitles

Michael Doesn't Have Any Change (Greek: Ο Μιχαήλ Δεν Έχει Ψιλά) is a 1926 Greek silent film created by Lykourgos Kalapothakis and starring Michael Michael. The cinematography was completed by Joseph Hepp. The film was a slapstick comedy along the lines of Villar at the Women's Baths in Faliro and Spyridion Baby which was filmed in 1911. The film influenced The Adventures of Villar and was part of a series of similar films created by Lykourgos Kalapothakis and starring Michael Michael. The other films were Michael's Dream, Concetta's Love Saves Michael and The Wedding of Concetta and Michael. Unfortunately, Michael's Dream is a lost film.

Michael Michael was a comedian of the Samartzi-Miliadis operetta troupe. In 1917, his greatest success was with the Elysia theater troupe in Piraeus. He participated in The Revival of 1917 a Greek revue written by Orfea Karavia along with Georgia Vassiliadou. Micheal appeared as a waiter in the Greek silent film Villar at the Women's Baths in Faliro. Between 1923 and 1925 Michael wrote and starred in the Michael tetralogy. Michael hired actors from the Samartzi-Miliadis troupe (θιάσου Σαμαρτζή-Μηλιάδη). His costar was Concetta Moschou and the films also featured appearances by Anna Roussou and Zaza Brillanti.

The films were not shown in large theaters but were given special screenings on some Sundays specifically in Athens or Piraeus if they were successful then the theater house continued to exhibit the films. On 2 May 1926 (Easter), the Argyllas cinema in Volos premiered the comedy Michael Doesn't Have Any Change. Luckily fragments exist from three of the four films giving historians an idea of the technique and method used at the time which can be viewed in the documentary narrated by Alekos Sakellarios entitled The Old Days (Τον Παλιό Έκεινο τον Καιρό) made in 1964.

== Plot ==
The story begins at the Oikonomidou pharmacy, in Hauteia (Omonoia) in Athens. Michael is a clumsy employee on a ladder and drops different items on pedestrians. He is fired from his job and becomes penniless. He follows a couple into a taxi in Omonoia, Athens. The taxi driver is wearing a fur coat and brings the couple including Micheal to the Royal Garden of Athens. Micheal follows them into the park. The woman played by Concetta Moshou is sitting at the park with her boyfriend but they are being robbed. Micheal comes to the rescue and saves the woman and they exit the park together. Another woman and the man who was robbed go to the Thon Mansion (Έπαυλη Θων) at the end of the Royal Garden of Athens. Michael and his new girlfriend arrive. He continues exhibiting his kooky idiotic behavior a group of men attack him and chase him around and his pants come off. He reunites with his love interest at the end of the movie.

== Cast ==
- Micheal M. Michael (Mihail M. Mihail) as Michael
- Concetta Moshou as love interest
- Emmanouil Tzanetis
- Anna Roussou
- Zaza Brillanti

== Bibliography ==
- Mitropoulou, Aglaia; Komninou, Maria (2006). Ελληνικός Κινηματογράφος [Ellinikos Kinimatografos]. Athens, Greece: Papazisis. ISBN 9789600220254.
- Rouvas, Angelos; Stathakopoulos, Christos (2005). Ελληνικος Κινηματογραφος: 1905-1970 [Greek Cinema: 1905-1970]. Athens, GR.: Hellenic Letters Publications (DOL). ISBN 9789604067770.
- Soldatos, Giannis (1982). Ιστορια του Ελληνικου Κινηματογραφου [Istoria tou Ellinikou Kinimatografou]. Athens, Greece: Aigokeros Publishing.
- Karalis, Vrasidas (2012). A History of Greek Cinema. London, UK: Continuum International Publishing. ISBN 9781441194473.
- Tsiapos, Argyris (2015). Οι Πρώτες Ταινίες του Ελληνικού Κινηματογράφου Η Ιστορία του Προπολεμικού Ελληνικού Σινεμά [The First Films of Greek Cinema The History of Pre-War Greek Cinema]. Athens, Greece: Serres Publishing. ISBN 978-960-93-7608-2.
- Poupou, Anna (December 2017). "Modern Space and Narration in the Greek Films of the Interwar Period". Film Icon: Journal of Greek Film Studies (4). ISSN 2241-6692. Archived from the original on 2 August 2019.
- Efthymiou, Antonios (28 March 2019). "Μιχαήλ Μιχαήλ του Μιχαήλ: Ένας Έλληνας Σαρλώ" [Michael Michael of Michael: The Greek Tramp] (in Greek). Athens, Greece: Max Mag. Archived from the original on 12 March 2023.
