= Golfo =

1915 Greek silent film

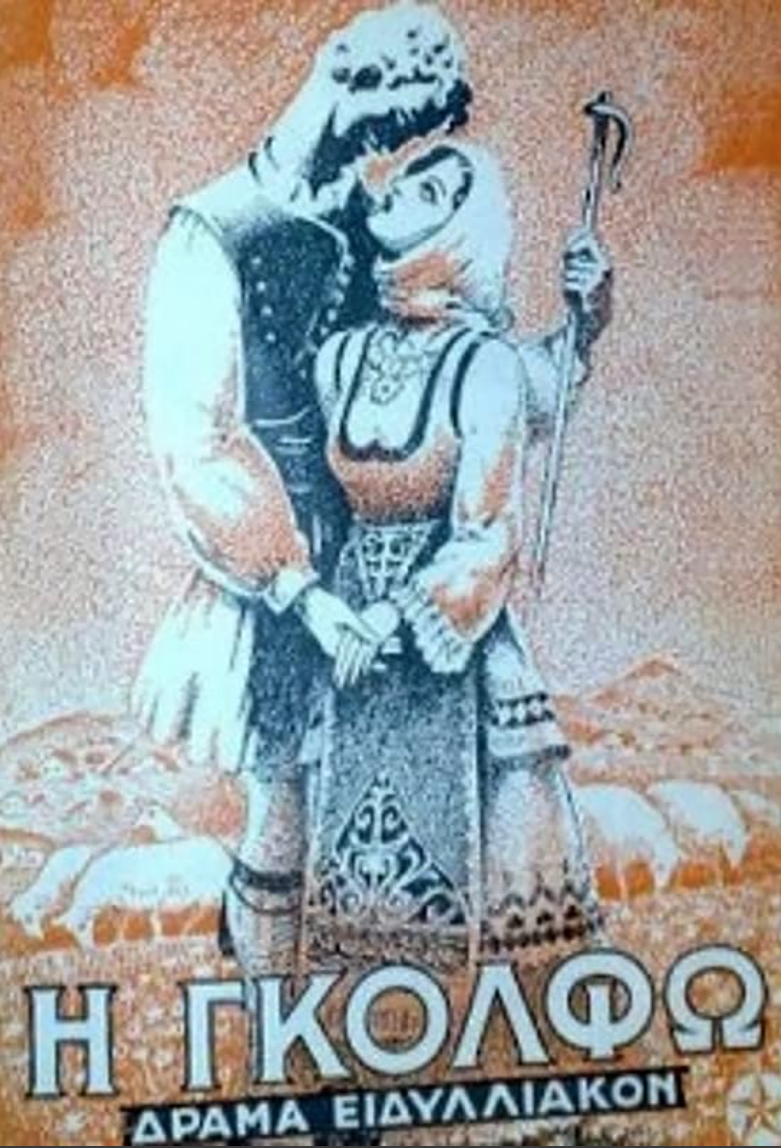
- Theatrical Poster
- Directed by: Konstadinos Bahatoris
- Written by: Spyros Peresiadis
- Based on: Golfo
- Produced by: Konstadinos Bahatoris; Nikolaos Koukoulas
- Starring: Virginia Diamadi; Olympia Damaskou; Dionysios Venieris; Georgios Ploutis
- Cinematography: Nikolaos Koukoulas; Filippo Martelli
- Release date: 22 January 1915
- Running time: 5 reels 1h 10min minutes
- Country: Greece
- Languages: Silent film; Greek intertitles
- Budget: 100,000 Drachmas

Golfo (Greek: Γκόλφω) is a 1915 Greek silent film directed by Konstadinos Bahatoris. It is the first Greek feature film and fustanella film. The fustanella is a pleated skirt-like garment that is also referred to as a kilt. The traditional Greek garment is still worn by the Presidential Guard of Greece. Another fustanella film is Astero (1929). Golfo was based on a popular Greek agricultural-themed play written by Spyridon Peresiadis. Golfo is a tragedy resembling William Shakespeare's Romeo and Juliet. It was the forerunner for agricultural-themed films in Greek cinema during the 1920s and 1930s inspiring films featuring sheep herders such as Astero (1929) and Daphnis and Chloe. The first synchronized sound film (talkie) in Greece was another fustanella shepherd romance inspired by Golfo released in 1932 entitled Sweetheart of a Shepherdess (Ο Αγαπητικός της βοσκοπούλας).

The original five-act play entitled Golfo first premiered theatrically in 1893 by an amateur theatre troupe in Akrata under the supervision of Spyros Peresiadis regrettably, he was blind. The play made its first appearance at the Athens Paradisos theater on 10 August 1894 by the theatre troupe Proodos. Over a decade later the play premiered in Thessaloniki on 26 January 1913 and Prime Minister Eleftherios Venizelos attended the event. The play became extremely popular across the entire nation and eventually was adapted for cinema around 1914. The premiere was on 22 January 1915 at the Pantheon Cinema in Omonia Square at 73 Panepistimiou. The critiques gave a favorable review but also pointed out several technical errors. The film was remade in 1955 with modern sound technology by Orestis Laskos and produced by Finos Film. Afterward, there have been countless theatrical reenactments of the play and more films were produced featuring the story of Golfo. Regrettably, the original film did not survive.

== Plot ==
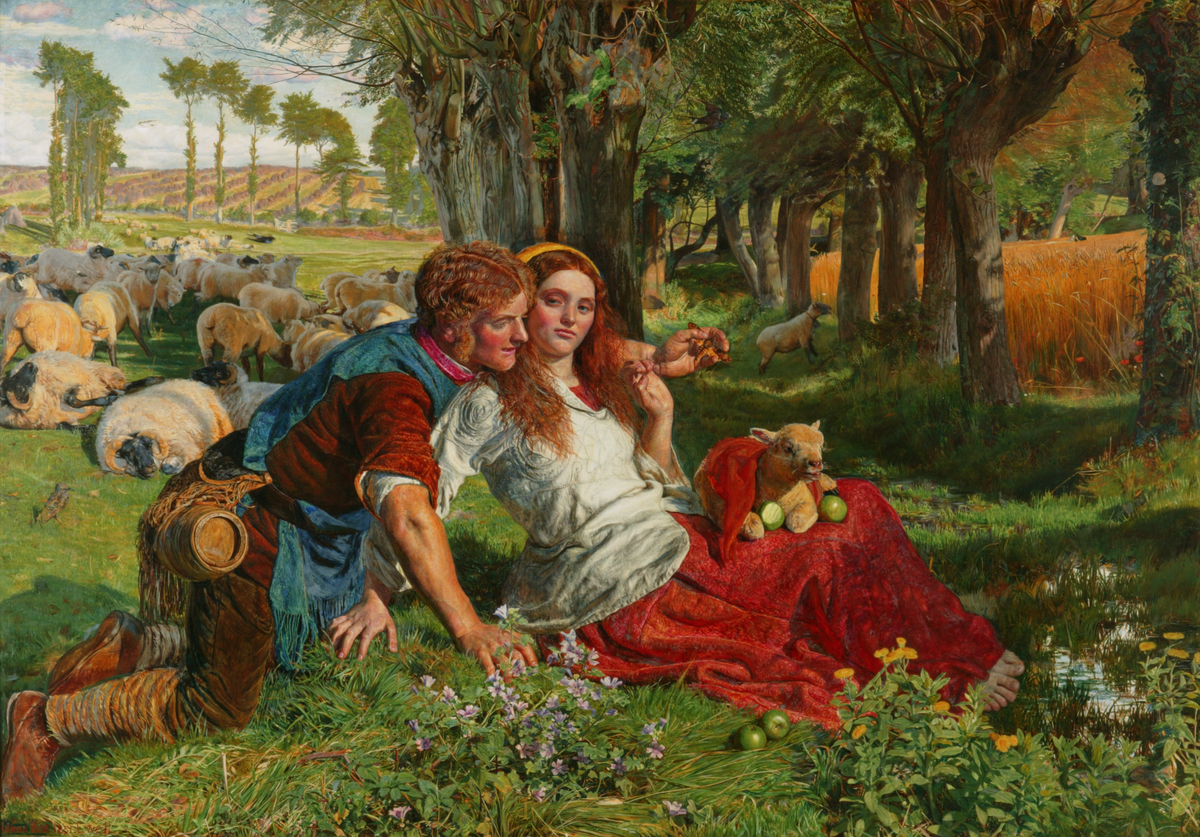
Loving Shepards

The scene of the story takes place on Mount Helmos, Kalavryta. The same place where Astero was filmed. Astero is also a character in the story. Golfo is a poor but very beautiful orphan and serves a shepherd named Zisi. The story begins with a romance between Golfo and a young sheep herder named Tasos. They exchange eternal vows from a young age and their love is very powerful. Formidable forces work against their eternal love. A wealthy aristocrat named Kitsos desires Golfo but she refuses his wedding proposals and stays faithful to her everlasting love. Tasos and Golfo become engaged and are about to get married. Kitsos and his family work hard to break up Golfo and Tasos. Kitsos convinces his cousin Stavroula to sever the bond between Tasos and Golfo. Initially, Tasos refuses Stavroula's proposals but she seduces him and also offers him a massive dowery. Meanwhile, he is also convinced that Golfo wants to marry Kitsos. Enraged he calls of the engagement with Golfo. He banishes her and she becomes delirious but attends the wedding and gives Tasos her blessing. Tasos overwhelmed with grief and his everlasting love for Golfo calls off the wedding and seeks out his true love. Regrettably, he finds her dead, she poisoned herself. Tasos seeing her laying dead takes his own life in a Romeo and Juliet style Shakespearean ending.

== Cast ==
- Virginia Diamadi as Golfo
- Dionysios Venieris
- Olympia Damaskou as Stavroula
- Georgios Ploutis as Tasos
- Hrysanthi Kondopoulou-Hatzihristou
- Pantelis Lazaridis
- Theodoros Litos
- Ahilleas Madras
- Th. Petsos
- Thanos Zahos

== Bibliography ==
- Grant, Barry Keith (2007). Schirmer Encyclopedia of Film Volume 2. Detroit, MI: Schirmer Reference. ISBN 978-0028657936.
- Ciaterli, Vera (22 January 2019). "Γκόλφω, το Μεγαλείο του Έρωτα" [Golfo, the Greatness of Love] (in Greek). Athens, Greece: The Purple Publication. Archived from the original on 9 August 2020.
- Staff, Archive (2006). "Γκόλφω" [Golfo] (in Greek). Athens, Greece: Greek Film Archive. Archived from the original on 27 September 2013.
- Peresiades, Spyridion (1907). Γκόλφω [Golfo]. Athens, Greece: Feksi Publishing.
- Kuhn, Annette; Westwell, Guy (2020). A Dictionary of Film Studies. Oxford, England: Oxford University Press. ISBN 9780192568045.
