= Astero =

Astero may refer to:

- Astero (1959 film), a Greek drama film
- Astero (1929 film), a Greek silent film
