= Daphnis and Chloe (film) =

1930 Greek silent film

- Theatrical Poster
- Directed by: Orestis Laskos
- Written by: Longus
- Screenplay by: Orestis Laskos
- Based on: Daphnis and Chloe
- Produced by: Yannis Karatzopoulos; Orestis Laskos; Dimitris Raptidis
- Starring: Apollon Marsyas; Lucy Matli; Ioannis Avlonitis; Grigoris Georgiadis; Korina Hatzimihelaki; K. Pavlopoulos; Giangos Lambrakis
- Edited by: Orestis Laskos
- Music by: Agis Asteriadis
- Production company: Astra Studios
- Distributed by: Astra Film
- Release date: 27 June 1931
- Running time: 5 reels 68 minutes
- Country: Greece
- Languages: Silent film; Greek intertitles
- Budget: 500,000 Drachmas

Daphnis and Chloe (Greek: Δάφνις και Χλόη), is a 1931 Greek romance film written and directed by Orestis Laskos, based on the story by the 2nd-century writer Longus. It is sometimes said to be the first European film containing nude scenes. The 1897 film by Georges Méliès After The Ball was much earlier, but uses simulated nudity via use of body stockings.

The film was shot in different areas on the island of Lesvos namely Mytilini and Agiasos. The Nymph scenes were shot at Lake Vouliagmeni in Corinth. The original silent film negatives were burned. There were talking copies produced after the 1940s one was found in the United States with English subtitles and speech. The Greek film library conservation and restoration department in collaboration with the original director's supervision restored the silent film to its original quality.

The film was made at the height of the Greek film era between 1925 and 1935. During this time over forty feature films were produced in Greece. The film was also one of the first script-written films for cinema and adapted from the Lungos' Ancient Greek. Greek actor Kimon Spathopoulos participated as a make-up artist.

== Plot ==
The story follows the traditional story of Daphnis and Chloe. A shepherd character named Lamon, finds a young boy sucking milk from one of its goats. He calls the boy Daphnis and adopts the boy as his child. Around the same time, another shepherd Dryas finds a young girl named Chloe and adopts her. Both children are raised as shepherds. In the film Daphnis and Chloe, the two small shepherds, grow up together in the mountains of the ancient Greek island of Lesbos and with the arrival of puberty. The children began to have sexual desires. The children become confused and agitated. They do not know how to respond to the call of the flesh. A young prince persistently desires Chloe but she is finally saved by Daphnis, who violently intervenes. Daphnis is arrested and sentenced to be flogged to death but at the last moment, it is revealed that the young shepherd, who had been abandoned as an infant in the forest, belongs to a noble family. Daphnis asks to marry his beloved, but now new class barriers are erected, until the final revelation that Chloe is also of noble birth, and everybody’s happy because they’re now rich and money is the only real happiness in the world.

== Analysis ==
The film by Laskos presented a series of firsts. It moved the lens while shooting. The shooting style was usually the camera staying still at the time. He used the new style in the scene of the nymphs that was filmed in Lake Vouliagmeni in Corinth. He also used panchromatic film, which gave many shades of black and white, in contrast to the orthochromatic film which gave pure white-black shades. Finally, the first of any other European film directors, Laskos presented a nude actor, which is why when the film was released it was labeled by some as pornography. Chloe's costumes were the same as those used in the Delphic Festivals.

The actors were amateurs and the protagonists, the Greek-American dancer Lousi (Loukia) Matli - and Apollo Marsyas (pseudonym of the later photographer Edison Vichos) were presented by the production as "young people of ancient Greek profile". Laskos fell in love with Loukia spontaneously and falsely. The film was shot in Lesvos, the place where the story of Daphne and Chloe took place, specifically in Agiasos, except for the nymph scenes, which for cost reasons were shot in Lake Vouliagmeni.

The original print and negatives of the film were lost for many years. At some point they were in the United States, that's why there were English subtitles in some parts of it. The film was restored by the technical service of the film archive of Greece in 1992, with the cooperation of the director.

The film remains faithful to the ancient work. It was based on the translation of the original by Ilias Voutieridis, published in 1922. The bucolic landscape was satisfactorily represented and the heroes were dressed in ancient fashion. The film offers discrepancies: Laskos did not add the raid of the bandits and the Mithymnians, due to high production costs.

== Cast ==
- Apollon Marsyas aka (Edison Vichos) as Daphnis
- Lucy Matli as Chloe
- Ioannis Avlonitis as Dryas
- Grigoris Georgiadis as Lamon
- Korina Hatzimihelaki as Lycaenion
- K. Pavlopoulos as Megacles
- Giangos Lambrakis as Dionysophanes

== See also ==
- The Adventures of Villar
- Astero (1929)

== Bibliography ==
- Bowe, Ewen (2019). Daphnis and Chloe. Cambridge, UK: Cambridge University Press. ISBN 9780521772204.
- Rouvas, Angelos; Stathakopoulos, Christos (2005). Ελληνικος Κινηματογραφος: 1905-1970 [Greek Cinema: 1905-1970]. Athens, GR.: Hellenic Letters Publications (DOL). ISBN 9789604067770.
- Grant, Barry Keith (2007). Schirmer Encyclopedia of Film Volume 2. Detroit, MI: Schirmer Reference. ISBN 978-0028657936.
- Kuhn, Annette; Westwell, Guy (2020). A Dictionary of Film Studies. Oxford, England: Oxford University Press. ISBN 9780192568045.
- Karalis, Vrasidas (2012). A History of Greek Cinema. London, UK: Continuum International Publishing. ISBN 9781441194473.
- Siakandaria, Spyros (27 April 2021). "Δάφνις και Χλόη: Ένα Αριστούργημα Ακατάλληλο διά Δεσποινίδας και Παιδιά" [Daphnis and Chloe: A Masterpiece "Not For Women and Children] (in Greek). Athens, Greece: Cosmopoliti. Archived from the original on 13 May 2021.
