= Astero (1929 film) =

1929 Greek silent film

- Theatrical Poster
- Directed by: Dimitris Gaziadis
- Screenplay by: Orestis Laskos; Dimitris Gaziadis; Pavlos Nirvanas
- Based on: Ramona
- Starring: Aliki Theodoridou; Kostas Mousouris; Emilios Veakis; Dimitris Tsakiris
- Cinematography: Michalis Gaziadis
- Music by: Philipps Chalachouris; Dimitrios Rodiou
- Production company: Dag Films
- Release date: 22 April 1929
- Running time: 4 reels 57 minutes
- Country: Greece
- Languages: Silent film; Greek intertitles

Astero (Greek: Αστέρω) is a Greek silent film directed by Dimitris Gaziadis in 1929. The film is considered a romantic fustanella film and was filmed in a rural Greek setting. The fustanella was traditional Greek attire. It is a pleated skirt-like garment that is also referred to as a kilt and was initially featured in the film Golfo. Dimitris Gaziadis wrote the screenplay in collaboration with Orestis Laskos. Laskos also wrote and directed the 1931 Greek silent film Daphnis and Chloe which was also filmed in an agricultural setting. The filming of Astero took place between 8-31 of March in 1929. A significant part of the filming took place in areas of the Peloponnese such as Mount Helmos, the Waters of Stygos, the Monastery of Mega Spilaio, the Diakopto–Kalavryta railway, Zachlorou, Mesorrougi, Solos, and Elatophyto.

The story was loosely based on the American novel Ramona. The screenwriter was Pavlos Nirvanas while Orestis Laskos and Dimitris Gaziadis adjusted the story to follow Greek standards. The American Indian heroes were turned into dressmakers and the film was shot in Kalavryta. The film was initially silent but the song Astero was added after along with vocals via a gramophone. The actor's lips were not synced and the vocals were contributed by Orestis Makris and the song was composed by Dimitrios Rodiou. The first synchronized sound film in Greece was the 1932 film Sweetheart of a Shepherdess (Ο Αγαπητικός της βοσκοπούλας) another fustanella shepherd romance inspired by Golfo.

The film was first screened on 22 April 1929 at the Splendid Cinema and Prime Minister Eleftherios Venizelos attended the premiere. In fact, Michalis Gaziadis allegedly filmed the arrival of the prime minister. He used the footage of the prime minister's entrance at the beginning of the film. In 1944, an audio version of the film was created with music by Yiannis Vidalis. Excerpts from this version were included in the 1964 film The Old Times. In 1959, a reboot of Astero was directed by Dinos Dimopoulos, starring Aliki Vougiouklaki as Astero. Alekos Sakellarios adapted the script and the music was by Takis Morakis. For decades, little-known footage survived from the film, which was thought to be lost. In 2003, thanks to the Lumière community project to find lost films, a copy of Astero with French subtitles was discovered in the French Film Archive. Based on this copy, the film was restored with the cooperation of the Greek and French Film Archives.

== Plot ==
Initially, the film begins in the ancient city of Athens, Greece during the late nineteen twenties featuring images of the busy streets and the Acropolis. Viewers follow the Greek railway to the beautiful countryside to a farm occupied by Mr. Mitro on Mount Helmos, Kalavryta. Mr. Mitro was also known as Asopius in the French version of the film. The film was shot in the northern village of the Peloponnese region named Kalavryta. Astero and Thymios are both young shepherds and Thymios falls in love with Astero. The story turns into a forbidden love drama because Thymios' father did not condone of the marriage between Astero and Thymios. Meanwhile, Astero's uncle is a wealthy political prisoner in Athens and Thymios' father Mr. Mitro secretly stole Astro's inheritance that was given to her by her uncle.

Thymios begs Astro to run away with him to live in the mountains but she sacrifices her love for Thymios to protect him lying that there was another man. Thymios was very angry with her. Another shepherd named Stamos arrives for the winter to tend his flock. He instantly falls in love with Astro. He asks Mr. Mitro for her hand in marriage. He immediately agrees relieved that he was rid of her. On the day of the marriage between Stamos and Astro, Thymios sadly wishes them well. Eventually, Stamos accidentally falls from a cliff (scenes not included in the French copy). Astro hears howling dogs and finds Stamos dead. Astro loses her mind and wonders the mountains.

Mr. Mitro notices that Thymios was in grief because of his love for Astro. Mr. Mitro reveals the truth to his son about her inheritance. Both Mr. Mitro and Thymios roam the mountain and villages searching for Astro to return her property. They reach a cave to rest where they spend the night after exhaustively searching for the young woman. The next morning a woman tells them where they can find Astro. Astro became estranged and does not recognize Thymios. She is brought back to the farm but her condition does not improve. After some time Astro was sitting in front of her window and hears Thymios playing his flute and singing. She finally recognizes him and runs outside into his arms. The film ends with Astro and Thymios embracing with the blessing of Mr. Mitro in the presence of the village community.

== Cast ==
- Aliki Theodorides as Astero
- Costas Moussouris as Thymios
- Aimilios Veakis as Mr. Mitros
- Dimitris Tsakiris as Stamos

== Bibliography ==
- Rouvas, Angelos; Stathakopoulos, Christos (2005). Ελληνικος Κινηματογραφος: 1905-1970 [Greek Cinema: 1905-1970]. Athens, GR.: Hellenic Letters Publications (DOL). ISBN 9789604067770.
- Poupou, Anna (December 2017). "Modern Space and Narration in the Greek Films of the Interwar Period". Film Icon: Journal of Greek Film Studies (4). ISSN 2241-6692. Archived from the original on 2 August 2019.
- Bandhauer, Andrea; Royer, Michelle (2015). Stars in World Cinema Screen Icons and Star Systems Across Cultures. New York, NY: I.B. Tauris Publishing. ISBN 9781786739896.
- Karalis, Vrasidas (2012). A History of Greek Cinema. London, UK: Continuum International Publishing. ISBN 9781441194473.
- Kuhn, Annette; Westwell, Guy (2020). A Dictionary of Film Studies. Oxford, England: Oxford University Press. ISBN 9780192568045.
- Karalis, Vrasidas (2016). Realism in Greek Cinema From the Post-War Period to the Present. New York, NY: I.B. Tauris Publishing. ISBN 9781786730770.
- Morrow, Jason (30 August 2018). "The 1929 film Star - A Complete Tribute to the Film Astero and 14 rare photos (Πλήρες αφιέρωμα και 14 σπάνιες φωτογραφίες από την κινηματογραφική "Αστέρω" του 1929!!!)". Greek Cinema. Archived from the original on 10 August 2020.
