= Zaza Brillanti =

Greek silent film and theater actress

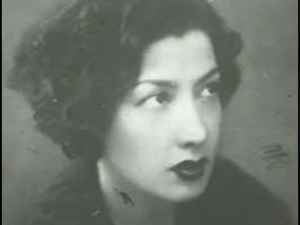
- Brillanti In the 1920s
- Born: Zacharenia Dertli; 1897; İzmir, Turkey
- Died: 1975 (aged 77–78); Athens, Greece
- Occupations: Actress; Singer
- Years active: 1915–1975
- Musical career
- Genres: 1920s Greek Pop; Greek Operetta; Musical theatre

Zaza Brillanti (Greek: Ζαζά Μπριλλάντη; 1897–1975) was a Greek singer, silent film and stage actress. She specialized in musical theater and operettas. She appeared in the Greek silent films Michael Doesn't Have Any Change (1924), Concetta's Love Saves Michael (1926), The Adventures of Villar, and many other films. She recorded music that was sold domestically and internationally some of her hit songs were Ah Marie (Αχ Μαρί), Olga the Singer (Όλγα η Τραγουδίστρα), and The Cigarette (Το Σιγαρέτο). She was a world-renowned actress and musician performing worldwide. She sang several songs written by renowned Greek composer Theophrastos Sakellaridis and also collaborated with him on musical theater projects. When she died she left her entire fortune to the Union of Greek Actors (ΤΑΣΕΗ ).

She was born in Smyrna and began performing in that city, and later traveled to Istanbul. She became popular in Istanbul and one of her performances at the time was the role of a soubrette named Lily in the operetta The Rose of Istanbul. She later traveled to Athens where she was discovered by Theophrastos Sakellaridis and Papaioannou. She performed in countless musical theater plays including To Fintanáki (Τό Φυντανάκι), Blue Mazurka (Μπλέ Μαζούρκα), and The Queen of the Fox Trot (Η βασίλισσα τού Φόξ Τρότ). She traveled all over the world as a performer including the United States. Towards the end of her career, she retired from theater but continued singing until her death in 1975. She died at around 78 years old in Athens, Greece.

== Biography ==
She was born in Smyrna and first appeared in the theater of Smyrna. She went by the name Zacharoula. She was part of the Metrika Theater Troupe. At nineteen years old in 1916 she portrayed the role of a soubrette named Lily in the operetta The Rose of Istanbul. She became well-known in Istanbul and gained notoriety as an actress. Three years later she was in Athens accompanied by acclaimed Greek actor of the national theater Giorgios Glinos. Regrettably, Zaza was not well known in the city but she became part of the Pappioannou Theater because the owner of the theater needed tenors and hired Glinos. As a favor to Glinos, he also hired Zaza. Zaza's first performance in Athens was an epic success she impressed Theophrastos Sakellaridis and Papaioannou. She became a well-known operetta performer in Athens, Greece.

She continued to collaborate with Theophrastos Sakellaridis and appeared in several silent films throughout her career including The Adventures of Villar. She studied music and dance in Milan, Italy. Later in her career, she played revue and musical comedy. She performed in Margarita (Μπαγιαντέρα) written by Emmerich Kálmán, Blue Mazurka (Μπλέ Μαζούρκα), Korydallós (Κορυδαλλός) written by Franz Lexar (Φραντς Λέχαρ), Zinkolét (Ζιγκολέτ), Ollandéza (Ολλανδέζα), Madame de temps (Μαντάμ ντέ Τέμπ), Modern Girls (Μοντέρνα Κορίτσια) and The Queen of the Fox Trot (Η βασίλισσα τού Φόξ Τρότ) by Joseph Ritchiardi (Ιωσηφ Ριτσιάρδη). She traveled to Europe and performed internationally with Spyros Patrikios and Manos Flippidis. When she returned to Greece in the 1930s she also participated in To Fintanáki (Τό Φυντανάκι) by Pantelis Horn at the Samartzi Theater (θεατρο Σαμαρτζη). Zaza also formed a theater troupe with Anna Lora and appeared at the Dionysia theater in Kallithea, Athens.

Her final stage performance was in 1947. The well-known actress appeared internationally from 1950 to 1954 in different countries. She continued her singing career. She appeared at the Manhattan Center at 311 West 34 Street on November 8, 1953, in the United States of America. She sang the songs of Greek musical theater. In 1964 she frequently appeared in the Greek music scene at different nightclubs known as boîte (μπουάτ) in Athens. One of the venues was known as Studio Oniron. She was well-liked among the younger audiences; these were her final public performances. She died in 1975 leaving her entire fortune to the Union of Greek Actors.

== Bibliography ==
- Mitropoulou, Aglaia; Komninou, Maria (2006). Ελληνικός Κινηματογράφος [Ellinikos Kinimatografos]. Athens, Greece: Papazisis. ISBN 9789600220254.
- Kazantzis, Konstantinos (September 1975). "Ζαζά Μπριλλάντη: Η Δόξα της Ελληνικής Οπερέττας" [Zaza Brillanti: The Glory of Greek Operetta]. Ta Athinaïká. 61. Archived from the original on May 28, 2023.
- Kairophylas, Giannes (1984). Η Αθήνα του Μεσοπόλεμου [The Athens of the Interwar Period]. Athens, Greece: Philippote Publishing.
- Papandreou, Nikephoros; Vafiadis, Efi (2007). Ζητήματα Ιστορίας του Νεοελληνικού θεάτρου Μελέτες Αφιερωμένες στον Δημήτρη Σπάθη [Issues in the History of the Modern Greek Theater "Studies Dedicated to Dimitris Spathis]. Athens, Greece: University of Crete. ISBN 9789605242398.
