= Vari Cave =

Cave in Attica, Greece

- Nympholyptos Cave
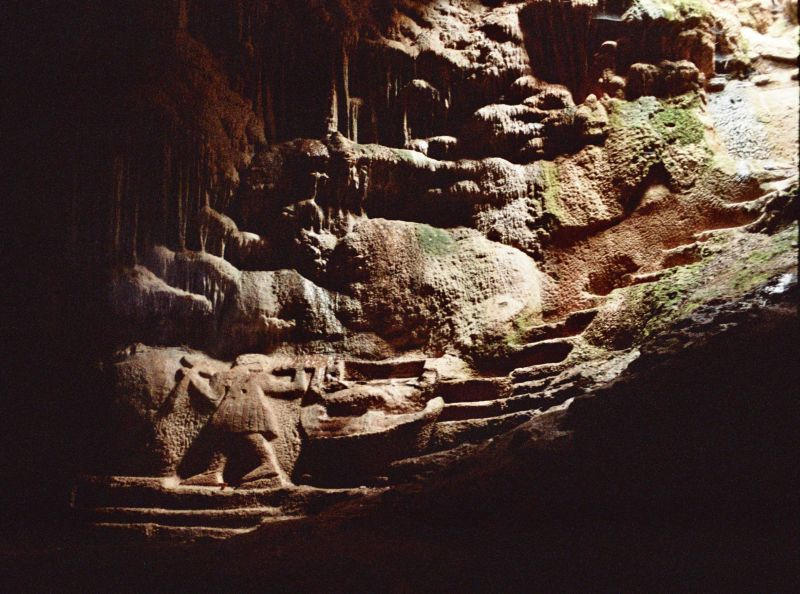
- A relief depicts the builder of the sanctuary, Archedemus the nympholept, near the steps in the cave.

- Location within Greece
- 37°51′30″N 23°48′06″E
- Type: Sanctuary
- Periods: Archaic Greece to Hellenistic period, later Roman Empire
- Location: Vari, Attica, Greece

History
- Built: 6th century BC
- Built by: Archedemus of Thera
- Abandoned: Approximately 6th century AD

Site notes
- Excavation dates: 1901
- Owner: Public
- Management: Ephorate of Palaeoanthropology and Speleology of Southern Greece
- Public access: No
- Website: Nympholyptos cave at Vari

The Vari Cave, also known as the Nympholyptos Cave (Greek: Σπήλαιο Νυμφολήπτου Βάρης), is a small cave northeast of Vari in Attica, Greece. In classical antiquity the cave was used as a shrine dedicated to Apollo, Pan and the Nymphs. The cave was occupied from the sixth to second century BC. The cave then fell into disuse until it was occupied again in the fourth century AD. It was finally abandoned in approximately the sixth century. The cave was excavated in 1901.

It lies near the top of one of the southern spurs of Mount Hymettus at an altitude of almost 300 meters. From Vari, it can be reached on foot in one hour. The cave is unique in Greece because of its rock-cut sculptures. The marble votive tablets from the cave are now exhibited at the National Archaeological Museum of Athens.

Because of its use for the veneration of Pan the cave is also called the Cave of Pan. It was one of the five caves of Pan in the vicinity of ancient Athens.

== History ==
According to inscriptions found in the cave, the sanctuary was built by Archedemus of Thera. He identified himself as a nympholept and states that he built the sanctuary "at the Nymph's counsel". Archedemus has a cross on his right shoulder that has as yet found no explanation.

Unlike many other caves, prehistoric remains were not found. The earliest inscription found in the cave was dated to approximately the beginning of the sixth century BC. A relief depicting Archedemus is dated to approximately 400 BC, most likely during the apex of the sanctuary's popularity. A second-century coin from Athens found in the cave provides evidence that it was continuously occupied from about 600 BC to 150 BC.

For the next four or five centuries the cave apparently fell into disuse because material dated to this period was not found. Coins found in the cave suggest that a new period of occupation began in the time of the Roman Empire, approximately during the reign of Constantine the Great (307–337 AD). Based on the number of coins found, the sanctuary became even more popular during the reign of his successor, Constantius II (337–361 AD). Coins indicate the sanctuary was still visited during the time of Arcadius (395–408 AD). Because no remains of later dates were found the cave was abandoned after this time. The absence of remains of offerings with significant value means the cave had probably always been a sanctuary for poor people.

A large number of Roman oil lamps with Christian designs were found in the cave. The excavators dated these to the same period as the coins, the fourth and early fifth century. Many remains of the first period of occupation, especially the reliefs, were found destroyed. The oil lamps and deliberate destruction of pagan sculptures led the excavators to the conclusion that the cave became a Christian shrine in the second period of occupation.

The site is not mentioned by any ancient writer. However, there is inconclusive evidence that Claudius Aelianus and Olympiodorus the Younger describe the cave. They write that the infant Plato was taken to a spot on Mount Hymettus by his parents Ariston and Perictione. His parents performed sacrifices on his behalf to Pan, Apollo, the Muses and the Nymphs. Even though the reliability of both late authors is questionable, the list of deities is nearly identical with those known to be honored in the cave.

More recent research disputes the interpretation of the cave as a Christian site. According to the latest evidence there were no Attic oil lamps with Christian designs until the fifth century. The small number of more sophisticated Christian oil lamps probably date to the sixth century. More importantly, the presence of Christian oil lamps does not imply the site was Christian. Elsewhere in the Roman Empire pagans used Christian oil lamps when non-Christian ones were not available. A remote cave like the one near Vari would have made a suitable location for continuing ethnic religious practice in secret after the Empire started persecuting pagans. If Christians smashed the sculptures, it most likely happened at the end of the reoccupation rather than its beginning. Instead, it was possible that the pagan Platonists of late Roman Athens would have frequented the site due to its association with Plato.

== Layout ==
The opening of the cave descends vertically. From the opening approximately a dozen steps are cut in the ridge at the western end, which are now broken. After these steps comes a landing from which the two rooms of the cave are visible, separated by a large rock partition.

From the landing another set of ancient stairs takes the visitor to a position at the upper side of the larger room. The largest shrine of the cave is found here. The shrine is dedicated to Pan and looks a like a rough imitation of the facade of a temple. A headless seated figure and an object with a shape resembling an omphalos are hewn from the rock in this room, but they are too damaged to be identified.

After descending more steps a rock-cut shrine to Apollo Hersus is found towards the bottom of the cave. Next to this shrine is the rock-cut image of Archedemus who is crudely depicted as a stonecutter with his tools.

== Excavations ==
Richard Chandler was the first scientist to visit and report on the cave in 1765. Through the 19th century the cave was visited by more scholars, but it was not until 1901 that it was excavated. The excavation was led by Charles Heald Weller of the American School of Classical Studies at Athens.
