= Lilí Brillanti =

Mexican television actress and TV host

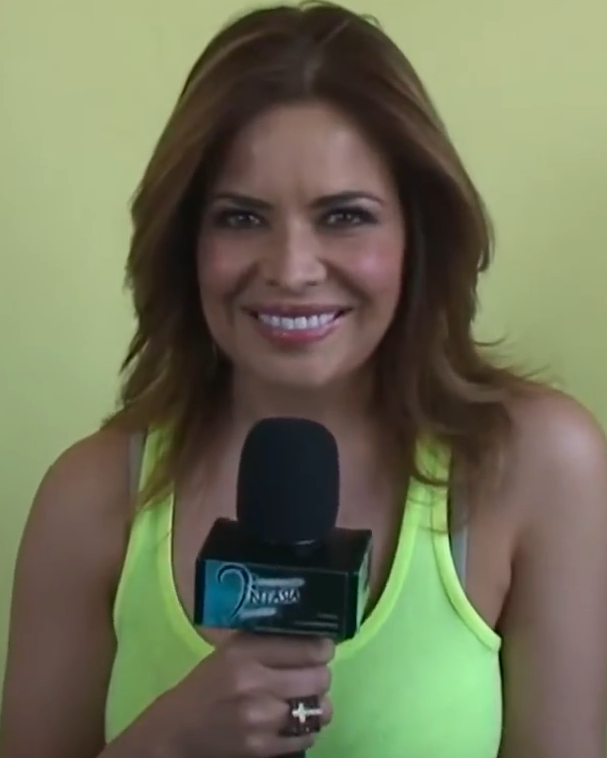
- Brillanti in 2017
- Born: María del Roble Brillanti Ramírez; March 11, 1973 (age 53); Mexico City, Mexico
- Education: National Autonomous University of Mexico; Instituto Nacional de Bellas Artes y Literatura
- Occupations: Actress, TV hostess
- Years active: 1994–present
- Spouse(s): Jaime Rivas (1994-2011); Jesús Zapico (2012-present)
- Children: Mael Zapico Brillanti (b. 2012)
- Parent(s): José Mucio Brillanti Sánchez; Cristina Ramírez
- Relatives: Araceli, Juan Ramón & Martha (siblings) Luis Enrique & Mara (nephews)

Lilí Brillanti (born María del Roble Brillanti Ramírez on March 11, 1973, in Mexico City, Mexico) is a Mexican actress and TV hostess.

== Biography ==
Brillanti was born on March 11, 1972, in Mexico City, Mexico. She was a daughter of José Mucio Brillanti Sánchez and Cristina Ramírez. Brillanti has two sisters, Araceli and Socorro. She studied communication sciences at the National Autonomous University of Mexico and dramatic art at the National Institute of Fine Arts. She is also a graduate of the Center for Artistic Education (CEA de Televisa).

In 1994 it was announced in the television program Pácatelas presented by Paco Stanley and in 1999 she was a program reporter Duro y Directo. Later, she joined the cast of Todo se vale and en Vida TV presented with Galilea Montijo and Héctor Sandarti. In 2010 she joined the ranks of TV Azteca.

== Personal life ==
Brillanti was married to Jaime Rivas from 1994 until 2011.

In June 2011, she began dating Jesús Zapico, a Spanish businessman, and after a seven-month relationship, they married in January 2012, the same year their son, Mael, was born, on May 13.

== Filmography ==
Television, telenovelas
Year	Title	Role	Notes
1994	Pácatelas		TV show
1999	Duro y Directo	Herself/hostess	TV show
1999/00	DKDA: Sueños de juventud	Reporter	Special appearance
2003	Amor Real	Asunción	Special appearance
2003/06	Mujer, casos de la vida real	Various characters	TV series
2004	Big Brother México	Herself/Guest	Reality show, Season 3 (part 2) VIP
2005	Viva la mañana	Herself/hostess	TV show
2006	Vida TV	Herself/hostess	TV show
2006	Duelo de pasiones		Special appearance
2006	La fea más bella	Hostess	Special appearance
2007	Nuestra casa	Herself/hostess	TV show
2007	Objetos perdidos	Wife	TV series
2008	Zona 4	Herself/hostess	TV show
2008	Las tontas no van al cielo	Tina	Recurring role
2009	Adictos		TV series
2009	Mujeres Asesinas 2	Patricia	Season 2, Episode:1, "Clara, fantasiosa"
2009	Camaleones	Susana	Recurring role
2016–present	Como dice el dicho	Various characters	TV series
