= Nympholepsy =

Ancient Greek belief in possession by nymphs

Nympholepsy is the belief of the ancient Greeks that individuals could be possessed by the nymphs. Individuals who considered themselves nympholepts would display a great religious devotion to the nymphs. An example is Archedemos of Thera, who built the sanctuary of the nymphs in the Vari Cave northeast of Attica, Greece.

== Etymology ==
Nympholepsy, a term first used in 1775 by Richard Chandler in Travels in Greece, is described as “frenzy or rapture [that was] supposed to take hold of a man upon gazing on a nymph”. It originates from the Greek word nymphe, meaning “bride”, “beautiful young woman”, then “semi-divine being in the form of a beautiful maiden”, and epilepsy, from the Greek word epilepsis, meaning “a seizure”. Though the root of nympholepsy implies a fit or seizure, according to Socrates, as presented in the writings of Plato, a person could experience nympholepsy without any “tearing of clothes, the biting of lips, or convulsions, or frenzies”. Plato implies in his writings that nympholepsy showed itself in others by “heightened awareness and eloquence”. Ancient Greece also had the word nymphleptos, meaning “caught by nymphs”.

== Nymphs ==
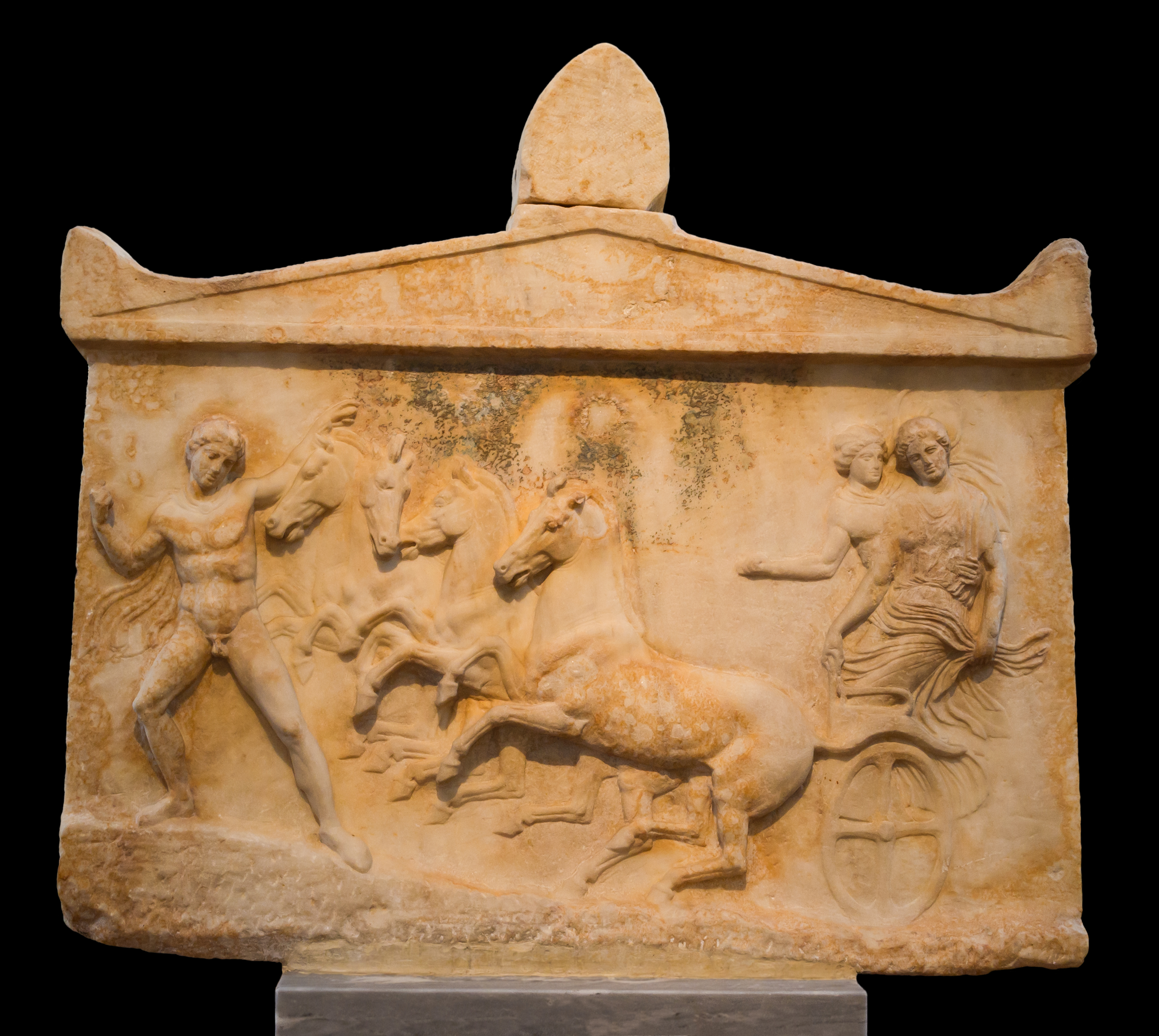
Relief sculpture of nymph Basile and Echelos

Nymphs were known as female spirits of the natural world, and were minor goddesses of various aspects in nature – forests, rivers, springs, meadows, mountains and seas. They were often depicted as beautiful young women with attributes symbolizing whatever natural formation they ruled over.

Nymphs are most often described as either the daughters of Zeus, the river Oceanus, or Gaia, though various other gods and goddesses have been attributed to their parentage over the years. Many gods are also described as having various nymph companions; for example, Artemis is known for her band of huntress nymphs, Poseidon is often accompanied by sea nymphs called Nereides, and nymph handmaidens were common companions to the goddesses of Olympos. Some elder nymphs, such as those of the Oceanids and Nereids class, were known as immortal goddesses, but most nymphs had a finite, though very long, lifespan.

== Archedemos and the Vari Cave ==
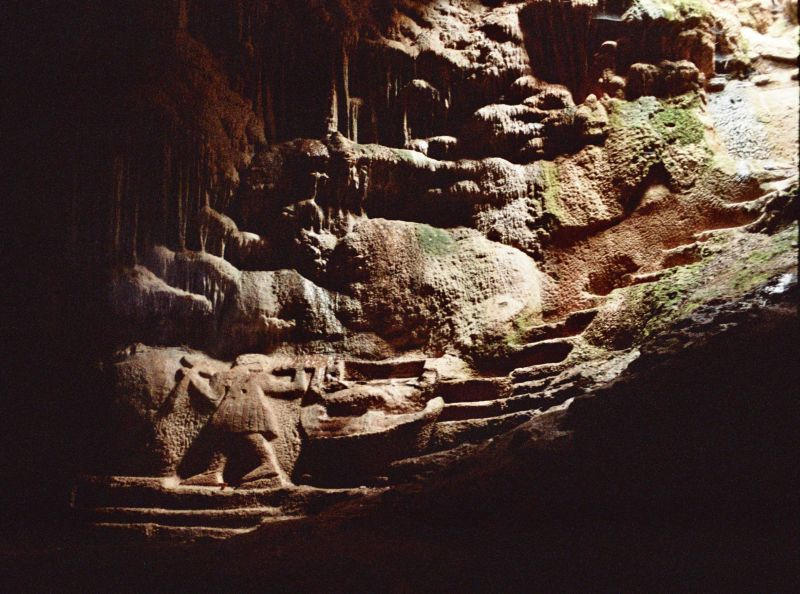
The steps in the Vari Cave, featuring a relief that depicts Archedemos

The Vari Cave, also known as the Nympholyptos Cave, lies northeast of Vari in Attica, Greece. Along with being a shrine to the nymphs, the Vari Cave is also a shrine devoted to the gods Pan and Apollo. It is also known as the Cave of Pan, and is unique for the reliefs cut into the rock by nympholept Archedemos. Archedemos was a native of Thera, an island which is now known as modern-day Santorini and is located 318 kilometers from the Vari Cave. According to Richard Chandler's writings in his account in Travels in Greece, Archedemos moved from his native town and settled in Attica, Greece, which was 35.5 kilometers from the Cave of Vari where he would later create his shrine to the nymphs, Apollo, and Pan.

Though it is a shrine devoted to Apollo and Pan as well, Archedemos created the cave "for the nymphs, by whom he was possessed". By the writings of Archedemos in the cave, it is presumed that the Vari Cave was furnished with a dwelling and a garden for the nymphs, as well as a well of water.

Richard Chandler, an English antiquary, was the first scientist to report his findings of the Vari Cave in 1765, but the cave was not excavated until 1901 by Charles Heald Weller.

== In popular culture ==
In modern culture, nympholepsy is also defined as "passion aroused in men by beautiful young girls", and "wild frenzy caused by desire for an unattainable ideal". The most famous example is in Vladimir Nabokov's Lolita, where the main character Humbert Humbert has an obsession with prepubescent girls he refers to as nymphets and self-describes as a nympholept. The obsession with young girls is explained with the loss of his first love when she was a young age, referring back to the definition of an unattainable ideal.
