= The Adventures of Villar =

1927 Greek silent film

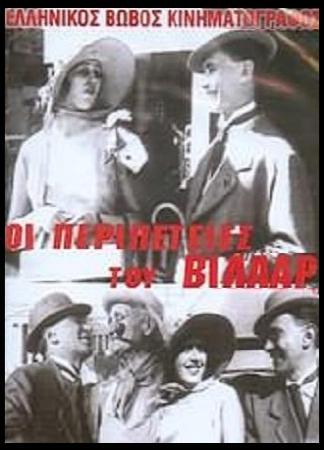
- Theatrical Poster
- Directed by: Joseph Hepp
- Screenplay by: Nikos Sfakianos
- Produced by: Joseph Hepp; Dimos Vratsanos
- Starring: Nikos Sfakianos; Nitsa Filosofou; Zaza Brillanti
- Cinematography: Joseph Hepp
- Music by: Minas Alexiadis
- Production company: Pallas Films
- Release date: June 24, 1927
- Running time: 2 reels 26 minutes
- Country: Greece
- Languages: Silent film; Greek intertitles

The Adventures of Villar (Greek: Οι Περιπέτειες του Βιλάρ) was a Greek silent film comedy created in 1927 by Hungarian-Greek cinematographer and film director Joseph Hepp. It was one of two films starring the iconic Charlie Chaplin-like character named Villar (Βιλλαρ) created by Nikolaos Sfakianos. The first film was entitled Villar at the Women's Baths in Faliro. The film inspired countless Greek films. The Apaches of Athens (1930) was also shot in a taxi. Kimon Spathopoulos portrayed a Greek Charlie Chaplin-like character in the Turkish comedy Sarlo Istanbul'da in 1954.

The silent film is a two-reel slapstick comedy about a man traveling around the city of Athens and getting himself into trouble everywhere he goes. Filming took place in the ancient city of Athens, Greece in 1927 and featured the city's most treasured historical landmarks. The film featured an African American dixieland jazz band composed of five members. They toured Europe in the 1920s and consisted of Johnnie Gratton the dancer/drummer, a banjo player, saxophonist, trombonist, and pianist. They were the first African American jazz performers to appear in an international film in Greece. The Adventures of Villar was also one of the first silent films to feature ancient Greek ruins.

Initially, the Greek film organization characterized the film as being produced in 1924 but after analysis by jazz and film historians namely Manolis Seiragakis, the consensus is that the film was completed in September 1927. During that same year, a jazz band toured Greece. Louis Douglas and his band toured Athens from February to March 1927 with the show Black People or Mavros Kosmos. The style and culture deeply influenced the music scene in Athens during that time. Louis Douglas returned to Greece and performed at a bar in Faliro intermittently while continually touring Europe throughout that period.

== Plot ==
Villar arrives from Paris and gets a job at a dry cleaners because of his friend Zaza. Villar has to find an apartment. He wakes up in a cow feeder on an extremely hot day and the intertitle reads in Greek "wake up lazy time to go to work (Ξύπνα τεμπέλα νά πάσ στή δουλειά σου)". On his way to work, he bumps into a beautiful woman (Nitsa) and follows her into a taxi and both characters begin to tour the city initially stopping to view different Greek ruins namely the Temple of Olympian Zeus and the Acropolis of Athens all the while exhibiting goofy behavior. The couple took another taxi to a restaurant bar featuring an African American dixie band and people dancing. Villar continues exhibiting kooky behavior. The band's protagonist begins dancing demonstrating the facial expressions predominant of jazz musical actors of the early 20th century namely black vaudeville performers. The band spread the style to Europe. The band's protagonist proceeds to interact with Villar both actors dance together. After several comedic gestures, Villar realizes he has to go to the dry cleaners. Zaza shows her affection for Villar but a disaster occurs at the dry cleaners and Villar creates a mess. Villar is fired from the dry cleaners and his friend Zaza resigns in protest. Villar proceeds to break up a wedding banquet continuing his idiotic behavior because it's so hot his butt is on fire and by the end of the film he meets up with Zaza and they live happily ever after.

== Analysis ==
The silent film was shot in black and white and featured technically complex shooting styles for the period. Parts of the film were shot in a moving car. Most of the film utilizes natural outdoor lighting. Some parts of the film were shot from another car shooting a moving car. The camera also chases Villar running in the streets of Athens. At one point the actor performs his own stunt by jumping from a moving trolly into a moving vehicle.

== Cast ==
- Nikolaos Sfakianos as Villar
- Nitsa Filosofou as the woman from the jazz club
- Zaza Brillanti as Zaza
- Johnnie Gratton as jazz dancer & drummer

== See also ==
- Chocolate Kiddies 1925 European tour

== Bibliography ==
- Sifaki, Eirini; Poupou, Anna; Nikolaidou, Afroditi (2014). World Film Locations: Athens. Chicago, Illinois: Intellect Books. ISBN 9781783203598.
- Bruzzo, Mariona; Sala, Teresa M. (2019). I Media Cities Innovative e-Environment for Research on Cities and the Media. Bologna, Italy: Bologna University Press. ISBN 9788491682769.
- Rouvas, Angelos; Stathakopoulos, Christos (2005). Ελληνικος Κινηματογραφος: 1905-1970 [Greek Cinema: 1905-1970]. Athens, GR.: Hellenic Letters Publications (DOL). ISBN 9789604067770.
- Seiragakis, Manolis (2 December 2020). "Χρονολογώντας οριστικά τις Περιπέτειες του Βιλλάρ (1927)" [The Correct date of The Adventures of Villar is 1927] (in Greek). Athens, Greece: Cosmopoliti. ISSN 2241-6692. Archived from the original on 7 August 2022.
- Lotz, Rainer E. (1997). Black People: Entertainers of African Descent in Europe and Germany. Bonn, Germany: Birgit Lotz Verlag. ISBN 3980346188.
- Georgakopoulou, Vena (8 April 2020). "Οι Περιπέτειες του Βιλάρ" [The Adventures of Villar] (in Greek). Athens, Greece: Film Archive of Greece. Archived from the original on 30 November 2022.
- Platzer, Karin; Sabo, Gabi (10 May 2011). "Villar's Adventures (I peripeties tou Villar)". Munich Germany: Underdox Film Festival. Archived from the original on 9 December 2022.
- Poupou, Anna (December 2017). "Modern Space and Narration in the Greek Films of the Interwar Period". Film Icon: Journal of Greek Film Studies (4). ISSN 2241-6692. Archived from the original on 2 August 2019.
