= Katafygio, Kozani =

Village in Western Macedonia, Greece

Katafygio Καταφύγιο
- Community
- Location within Greece
- Coordinates: 40°15.5′N 22°8.6′E
- Country: Greece
- Administrative region: West Macedonia
- Regional unit: Kozani
- Municipality: Velventos
- Elevation: 1,400 m (4,600 ft)

Population (2021)
  - Community: 57
- Time zone: UTC+2 (EET)
  - Summer (DST): UTC+3 (EEST)
- Postal code: 504 00
- Area code: +30-2464
- Vehicle registration: ΚΖ

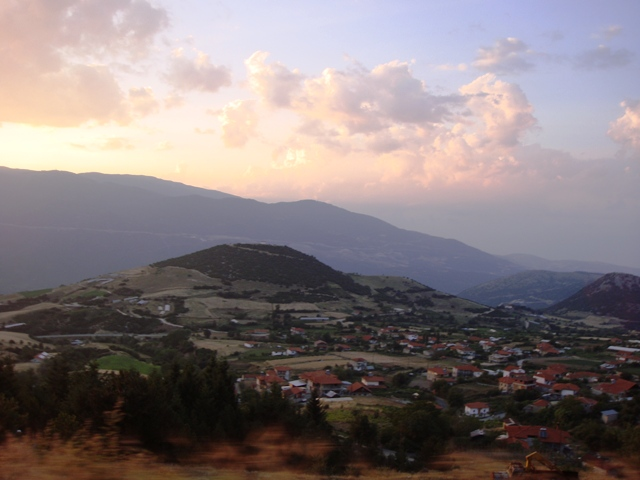
Pieria Mountains - View from a hunters' shelter towards the village of Katafygi

Katafygio (Greek: Καταφύγιο) is a village and a community in the regional unit of Kozani, northern Greece. It is part of the municipality of Velventos. The 2021 census recorded 57 inhabitants in the village.

It is the birth place of John Zizioulas, Metropolitan of Pergamon and George Zorbas, inspiration for the novel Zorba the Greek.
