= Church of Saint Nicetas =

Church of Saint Nicetas may refer to:

- Church of Saint Nicetas beyond the Yauza River, Moscow
- Church of Saint Nicetas, Yaroslavl, a Russian Orthodox church in Yaroslavl, Russia
