= John Zizioulas =

Greek Orthodox prelate (1931–2023)

His Eminence John Zizioulas
- Metropolitan of Pergamon
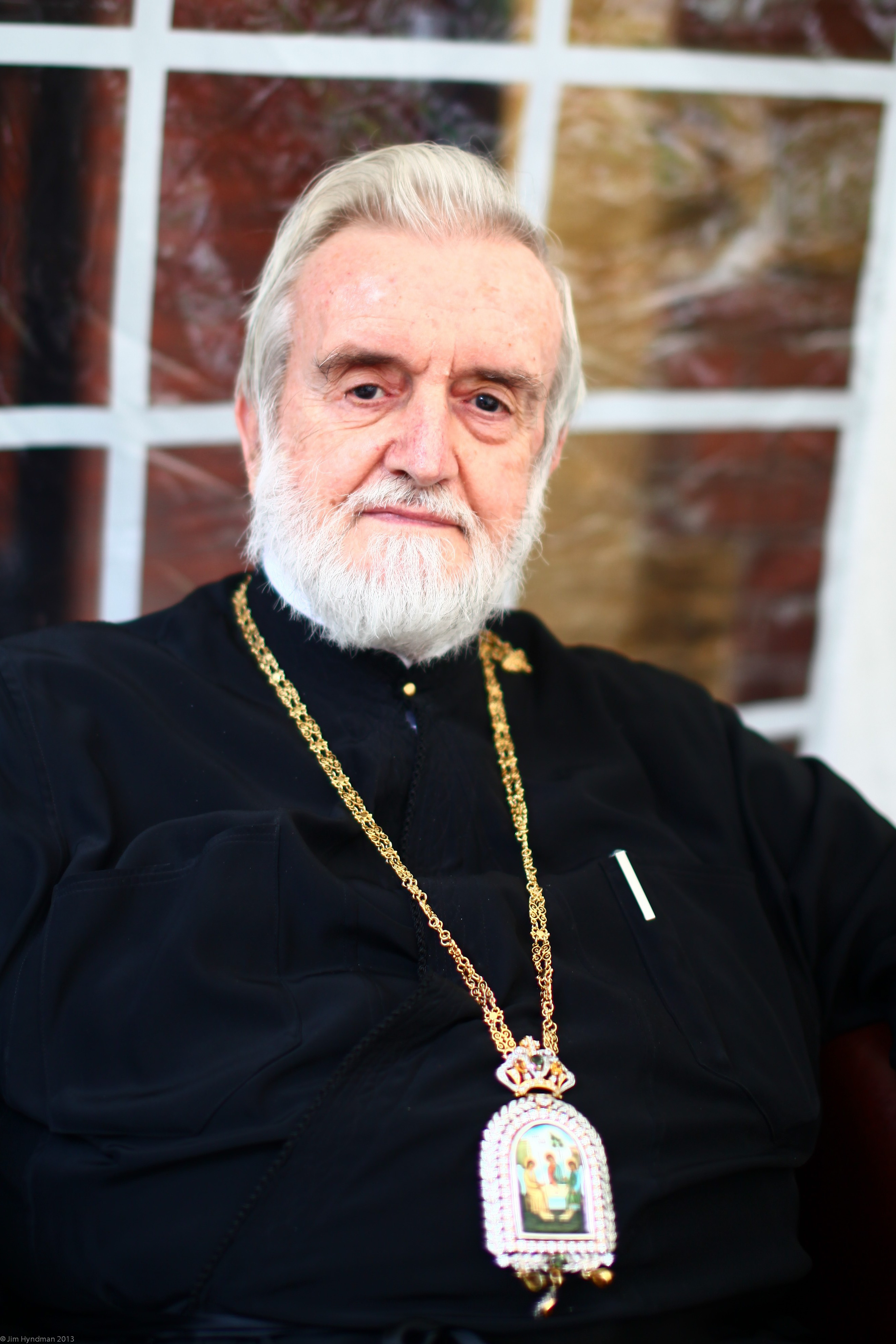
- Zizioulas in 2014
- Native name: Ιωάννης Ζηζιούλας
- Church: Ecumenical Patriarchate of Constantinople
- Diocese: Metropolis of Pergamon

Orders
- Consecration: 22 June 1986

Personal details
- Born: 10 January 1931 Katafygio, Kozani, Greece
- Died: 2 February 2023 (92 years old) Athens, Greece
- Buried: First Cemetery of Athens
- Denomination: Eastern Orthodox
- Education: University of Thessaloniki, University of Athens

John Zizioulas (/zɪziˈuːlɑːs/; Greek: Ιωάννης Ζηζιούλας [ziˈzʝulas]; 10 January 1931 – 2 February 2023) was a Greek Orthodox bishop who served as the Metropolitan of Pergamon of the Ecumenical Patriarchate of Constantinople from 1986 until his death in 2023. He was one of the most influential Orthodox Christian theologians of the 20th and 21st centuries.

== Early life and career ==
Metropolitan John was born in Katafygio, now part of the municipality of Velventos, Western Macedonia. His education began with study at the Universities of Thessaloniki and Athens in 1950, and then a year at the Ecumenical Institute of Bossey in 1955. Between 1960 and 1964 Zizioulas did doctoral research under the Eastern Orthodox theologian Georges Florovsky (1893–1979; Chair of Eastern Church History at Harvard and a member of the Russian Orthodox Church) and was a Fellow at Dumbarton Oaks Center for Byzantine Studies. He received his doctorate in 1965 from the University of Athens.

Zizioulas took up a post at the University of Athens in 1964 as assistant professor of Church history, and then six years later, worked as professor of patristics at the New College, Edinburgh from 1970 until 1973. He moved to the University of Glasgow where he held a personal chair in systematic theology for some fourteen years. In addition, Zizioulas also was a visiting professor at the Research Institute in Systematic Theology of King's College London. In 1986, he was elected titular metropolitan of Pergamon. In the same year, he assumed a full-time academic post at Thessaloniki University's School of Theology as professor of dogmatics. In 1993 he was elected a member of the Academy of Athens, serving as its chairman in 2002.

== Honors ==
Zizioulas held honorary doctorates from the Catholic Institute of Paris, the University of Belgrade, St. Sergius Institute in Paris, the Babeș-Bolyai University, University of Münster (2010), LMU Munich (2015), New Georgian University in Poti (2019). He also was elected an Honorary Member of the Volos Academy for Theological Studies (2011).

In 2003, the President of Greece awarded him the Senior Brigadier General of the Order of the Phoenix, In 2007 he was awarded the Lambeth Cross. In 2019 President of Ukraine awarded him the Order of Merit III degree.

== Death ==
Zizioulas died from COVID-19 in Athens, on 2 February 2023, at the age of 92.

== Theology ==
The theological work of Metropolitan John has focused upon the twin themes of ecclesiology and theological ontology. The theology of Metropolitan John reflects the influence of Russian émigré theologians such as Nikolai Afanassieff, Vladimir Lossky and his teacher Georges Florovsky. Zizioulas has also been significantly influenced by the ascetical theology of Archimandrite Sophrony (Sakharov), founder of the Stavropegic Monastery of St John the Baptist in Essex, England.

=== Ecclesiology ===
Zizioulas' ecclesiology was first developed in his doctoral dissertation, subsequently published in English as Eucharist, Bishop, Church. Here Metropolitan John develops critically the eucharistic ecclesiology of Nikolai Afanassieff. He accepts Afanassieff's principal contention that the Church is to be understood in terms of the Eucharist. However, he criticises Afanassief's understanding as overly congregational and insufficiently episcopal in its emphasis. Finally, Zizioulas advocates an episcopocentric understanding of Church structure, understanding the Bishop primarily as the president of the Divine Liturgy and the Eucharistic community.

=== Theological ontology ===
Zizioulas worked on the theology of the person, appealing to the work of Irenaeus and Maximus the Confessor. The primary focus of his work was to develop his own ontology of personhood derived from an extensive investigation of Greek philosophy, patristic era writings and modern rationalist philosophy.

He argues that full humanity is achieved only as person so that they may participate (koinonia) in the Trinitarian life of God. However, an essential component of the ontology of personhood is the freedom to self-affirm the participation in relationship. He continues that man initially exists as a biological hypostasis, constrained as to the types of relationships one can have (biological) and to the eventual end of this type of being – death.

He makes use of existentialist philosophers and novelists, notably the French absurdist writer Albert Camus, to show that the only type of ontological freedom in the biological hypostasis is the choice to commit suicide. He claims that Baptism constitutes an ontological change in the human, making them an ecclesial hypostasis, or a person. This rebirth 'from above' gives new ontological freedom as it is not constrained by the limits of biological existence. Such ecclesial being is eschatological, meaning it is a paradoxical 'now,' but 'not yet.' The completion of this rebirth from above is the day of resurrection when the body will no longer be subject to death.

John Zizioulas, Eastern Orthodox metropolitan of Pergamon, presents the encyclical Laudato si' at the Press conference in Rome (18 June 2015).

== Bibliography ==
- 'Ἡ ἑνότης τῆς Ἐκκλησίας ἐν τῇ Θείᾳ Εὐχαριστίᾳ καί τῷ Ἐπισκόπῳ κατά τούς τρεῖς πρώτους αἰώνας." (En Athi̲nais, 1965). Doctoral Dissertation. Published in French translation as "L' Eucharistie, L'évêque Et L'eglise Durant Les Trois Premiers Siècles." 2nd ed. Translated by Jean-Louis Palierne. (Paris: Desclée De Brouwer, 1994). Published in English translation as "Eucharist, Bishop, Church" (see below).
- L'Être ecclésial (Paris: Labor et Fides, 1981). ISBN 978-2-8309-0180-1. Published in English translation as "Being as Communion" (see below).
- H κτίση ως Eυχαριστία, Θεολογική προσέγγιση στο πρόβλημα της οικολογίας [Creation as Eucharist: a Theological approach to a problem of ecology] (Athens: Akritas, 1992). ISBN 978-960-7006-98-1. This work is based on lectures previously delivered in English. Available in three parts: King's Theological Review vol. 12, no. 1 (1989): 1-5, no. 2 (1989): 41-45, vol. 13, no. 1 (1990): 1-5.
- Being as Communion: Studies in Personhood and the Church (Crestwood, NY: St Vladimir's Seminary Press, 1997). ISBN 978-0-88141-029-7.
- Eucharist, Bishop, Church: The Unity of the Church in the Divine Eucharist and the Bishop During the First Three Centuries (Brookline, MA: Holy Cross, 2001). ISBN 978-1-885652-51-5.
- Eλληνισμός και Xριστιανισμός, η συνάντηση των δύο κόσμων [Hellenism and Christianity: The meeting of two worlds] (Athens: ApostolikeDiakonia, 2003).
- Communion & Otherness: Further Studies in Personhood and the Church (London: T & T Clark, 2007). ISBN 978-0-567-03148-8; translated into Dutch by Hildegard C. Koetsveld OSB (Middelburg: Skandalon, 2019). ISBN 978-94-92183-82-8.
- Lectures in Christian Dogmatics (London: T&T Clark, 2009). ISBN 978-0-567-03315-4.
- The One and The Many: Studies on God, Man, the Church, and the World Today (Sebastian Press, 2010) ISBN 978-0-9719505-4-2.
- Remembering the Future: An Eschatological Ontology (London: T&T Clark, 2012). ISBN 978-0-567-03235-5.

There are extensive bibliographies devoted to Zizioulas' published works in various languages in:

- McPartlan, Paul. The Eucharist Makes the Church: Henri De Lubac and John Zizioulas in Dialogue (Edinburgh: T&T Clark, 1993) ISBN 9781892278616
- Papanikolaou, Aristotle. Being with God: Trinity, Apophaticism, and Divine-Human Communion (Notre Dame, IN: University of Notre Dame Press, 2006) ISBN 9780268038311
- Malecki, Roman. Kościół jako wspólnotą. Dogmatyczno-ekumeniczne studium eklezjologii Johna Zizioulasa (In English: The Church as Communion. A Dogmatic and Ecumenical Study of Ecclesiology of John Zizioulas). Lublin: RW KUL, 2000.

== See also ==
- Anti-individualism
- Christian philosophy
- Ecumenism
- Eucharistic theology
- Jürgen Moltmann
- Orthodox Christian theology
- Social trinitarianism
