= List of New Testament minuscules (1601–1700) =

A New Testament minuscule is a copy of a portion of the New Testament written in a small, cursive Greek script (developed from Uncial).

== Legend ==
- The numbers (#) are the now standard system of Caspar René Gregory, often referred to as the Gregory-Aland numbers.
- Dates are estimated to the nearest 100 year increment where specific date is unknown.
- Included among the cataloged minuscules are the following types of manuscripts, color coded:

Grey represents continuous text manuscripts containing only New Testament portions
Beige represents manuscripts with New Testament portions and a catena (quotations from church fathers)
Light cyan represents manuscripts of single-author commentaries who included the full Scripture text.
Light red represents manuscripts of single-author commentaries who included both the full Scripture text and a catena.
Light purple represents manuscripts of commentaries where the Scripture text was abridged.
White represents manuscript numbers no longer in use.

- Content generally only describes sections of the New Testament: Gospels, The Acts of the Apostles (Acts), Pauline epistles, and so on. Sometimes the surviving portion of a codex is so limited that specific books, chapters or even verses can be indicated. Linked articles, where they exist, generally specify content in detail, by verse.
- Digital images are referenced with direct links to the hosting web pages, with the exception of those at the INTF. The quality and accessibility of the images is as follows:

Gold color indicates high resolution color images available online.
Tan color indicates high resolution color images available locally, not online.
Light tan color indicates only a small fraction of manuscript pages with color images available online.
Light gray color indicates black/white or microfilm images available online.
Light blue color indicates manuscript not imaged, and is currently lost or ownership unknown.
Light pink color indicates manuscript destroyed, presumed destroyed, or deemed too fragile to digitize.
Violet color indicates high resolution ultraviolet images available online.

† Indicates the manuscript has damaged or missing pages.
^{P} Indicates only a portion of the books were included.
^{K} Indicates manuscript also includes a commentary.
^{S} Indicates lost portions of manuscript replaced via supplement of a later hand.
^{abs} (abschrift) Indicates manuscript is copy.
[ ] Brackets around Gregory-Aland number indicate the manuscript belongs to an already numbered manuscript, was found to not be a continuous text manuscript, was found to be written in modern Greek versus Koine Greek, was proved a forgery, or has been destroyed.

== Minuscules 1601-1700 ==
| # | Date | Contents | Pages | Institution and refs. | City, State | Country | Images |
|---|---|---|---|---|---|---|---|
| 1601 | 13th | Gospels† | 119 | Vatopedi Monastery, 971 | Mount Athos | Greece | INTF |
| 1602 | 14th | Gospels | 223 | Vatopedi Monastery, 974 | Mount Athos | Greece | INTF |
| 1603 | 12th | Gospels | 244 | Vatopedi Monastery, 975 | Mount Athos | Greece | INTF |
| 1604 | 13th | Gospels | 215 | Vatopedi Monastery, 976 | Mount Athos | Greece | INTF |
| 1605 | 1342 | Gospels | 212 | Vatopedi Monastery, 978, fol. 3-214 | Mount Athos | Greece | INTF, CSNTM |
| 1606 | 13th | Gospels | 186 | Vatopedi Monastery, 979 | Mount Athos | Greece | INTF |
| 1607 | 11th | Mark†, Luke† | 127 | Vatopedi Monastery, 891 | Mount Athos | Greece | INTF, CSNTM |
| 1608 | 14th | Gospels† | 144 | Iviron Monastery, 635 | Mount Athos | Greece | INTF |
| 1609 | 13th | Gospels, Acts, General Epistles, Pauline Epistles | 387 | Great Lavra Monastery, A' 90 | Mount Athos | Greece | INTF |
| 1610 | 1463 | Acts†, General Epistles†, Pauline Epistles† | 246 | National Library, 209 | Athens | Greece | CSNTM |
| 1611 | 10th | Acts, General Epistles, Pauline Epistles, Revelation | 312 | National Library, 94 | Athens | Greece | CSNTM |
| 1611 | 10th | Acts, General Epistles, Pauline Epistles, Revelation | 312 | National Library, 94 | Athens | Greece | INTF |
| 1612 | 12th | Gospels† | 158 | Great Lavra Monastery, G' 29 | Mount Athos | Greece | INTF |
| 1613 | 12th | Theophylact Commentary on Gospel of Matthew, John | 277 | Great Lavra Monastery, D' 85 | Mount Athos | Greece | INTF |
| 1614 | 1324 | Gospels† | 195 | Great Lavra Monastery, E' 117, fol. 1-195 | Mount Athos | Greece | INTF, CSNTM |
| 1615 | 16th | Gospels | 302 | Great Lavra Monastery, E' 140 | Mount Athos | Greece | INTF |
| 1616 | 15th | Theophylact Commentary on the Gospels† | 358 | Great Lavra Monastery, E' 149 | Mount Athos | Greece | INTF |
| 1617 | 15th | New Testament | 362 | Great Lavra Monastery, E' 157 | Mount Athos | Greece | INTF |
| 1618 | 14th | Gospels†, Acts†, General Epistles†, Pauline Epistles† | 175 | Great Lavra Monastery, E' 164 | Mount Athos | Greece | INTF |
| 1619 | 14th | Gospels†, Acts†, General Epistles†, Pauline Epistles† | 215 | Great Lavra Monastery, E' 175 | Mount Athos | Greece | INTF |
| 1620 | 14th | Gospels | 191 | Great Lavra Monastery, E' 179, fol. 1-191 | Mount Athos | Greece | INTF |
| 1621 | 14th | Gospels† | 186 | Great Lavra Monastery, E' 181 | Mount Athos | Greece | INTF |
| 1622 | 14th | Gospels†, Acts†, General Epistles†, Pauline Epistles† | 352 | Great Lavra Monastery, W' 1 | Mount Athos | Greece | INTF |
| 1623 | 14th | Gospels | 215 | Great Lavra Monastery, W' 5 | Mount Athos | Greece | INTF |
| 1624 | 15th | Gospels | 293 | Great Lavra Monastery, W' 9 | Mount Athos | Greece | INTF |
| 1625 | 15th | Gospels | 318 | Great Lavra Monastery, W' 12 | Mount Athos | Greece | INTF |
| 1626 | 15th | Gospels, Acts, General Epistles, Pauline Epistles, Revelation 1:1-9:15† | 272 | Great Lavra Monastery, W' 16 | Mount Athos | Greece | INTF |
| 1627 | 16th | Gospels | 452 | Great Lavra Monastery, W' 19 | Mount Athos | Greece | INTF |
| 1628 | 1400 | Theophylact Commentary on Gospels, Acts, General Epistles, Pauline Epistles | 260 | Great Lavra Monastery, W' 20 | Mount Athos | Greece | INTF, CSNTM |
| 1629 | 1653 | Gospels† | 86 | Great Lavra Monastery, W' 102 | Mount Athos | Greece | INTF |
| 1630 | 1314 | Gospels | 340 | Great Lavra Monastery, W' 107 | Mount Athos | Greece | INTF, CSNTM |
| 1631 | 18th | Gospel of Matthew† | 140 | Great Lavra Monastery, W' 111 | Mount Athos | Greece | INTF |
| 1632 | 14th | Gospels | 269 | Great Lavra Monastery, W' 113 | Mount Athos | Greece | INTF |
| 1633 | 14th | Gospels | 206 | Great Lavra Monastery, W' 118 | Mount Athos | Greece | INTF |
| 1634 | 14th | Gospels | 257 | Great Lavra Monastery, W' 125 | Mount Athos | Greece | INTF |
| 1635 | 15th | Gospels | 151 | Great Lavra Monastery, W' 127 | Mount Athos | Greece | INTF |
| 1636 | 15th | Gospels†, Acts†, General Epistles†, Pauline Epistles† | 298 | Great Lavra Monastery, W' 139 | Mount Athos | Greece | INTF |
| 1637 | 1328 | New Testament | 294 | Great Lavra Monastery, W' 141 | Mount Athos | Greece | INTF |
| 1638 | 14th | Gospels† | 232 | Great Lavra Monastery, L' 101 | Mount Athos | Greece | INTF |
| 1639 | 17th | Gospels | 340 | Great Lavra Monastery, L' 119 | Mount Athos | Greece | INTF |
| 1640 | 18th | Gospels | 275 | Great Lavra Monastery, L' 120 | Mount Athos | Greece | INTF |
| 1641 | 15th | Gospels | 184 | Great Lavra Monastery, L' 121 | Mount Athos | Greece | INTF |
| 1642 | 1278 | Gospels, Acts, General Epistles, Pauline Epistles | 321 | Great Lavra Monastery, L' 128 | Mount Athos | Greece | INTF |
| 1643 | 14th | Gospels†, Acts†, General Epistles†, Pauline Epistles† | 444 | Great Lavra Monastery, L' 134 | Mount Athos | Greece | INTF |
| 1644 | 17th | Matthew† 20:2-28:20, Mark, Luke, John | 225 | Great Lavra Monastery, L' 147 | Mount Athos | Greece | INTF |
| 1645 | 1303 | Gospels | 353 | Great Lavra Monastery, L' 169 | Mount Athos | Greece | INTF |
| 1646 | 1172 | Gospels, Acts, General Epistles, Pauline Epistles | 343 | Great Lavra Monastery, L' 173 | Mount Athos | Greece | INTF |
| 1647 | 1274 | Gospels | 146 | Great Lavra Monastery, L' 174, fol. 5-150 | Mount Athos | Greece | INTF |
| 1648 | 15th | Gospels† | 245 | Great Lavra Monastery, L' 175 | Mount Athos | Greece | INTF |
| 1649 | 15th | Gospels, Acts, General Epistles, Pauline Epistles | 358 | Great Lavra Monastery, L' 182 | Mount Athos | Greece | INTF |
| 1650 | 14th | Gospels† | 245 | Great Lavra Monastery, L' 184 | Mount Athos | Greece | INTF |
| 1651 | 15th | Gospels† | 324 | Great Lavra Monastery, Q' 80 | Mount Athos | Greece | INTF |
| 1652 | 16th | New Testament† | 506 | Great Lavra Monastery, Q' 152 | Mount Athos | Greece | INTF |
| 1653 | 15th | Gospels | 214 | Great Lavra Monastery, H' 48 | Mount Athos | Greece | INTF |
| 1654 | 1326 | Matthew† 9:16-28:20, Mark, Luke, John | 208 | Great Lavra Monastery, H' 54 | Mount Athos | Greece | INTF |
| 1655 | 14th | Gospels† | 171 | Great Lavra Monastery, H' 63 | Mount Athos | Greece | INTF |
| 1656 | 15th | Gospels†, Acts†, General Epistles†, Pauline Epistles† | 294 | Great Lavra Monastery, H' 64 | Mount Athos | Greece | INTF |
| 1657 | 14th | Gospels† | 276 | Great Lavra Monastery, H' 79 | Mount Athos | Greece | INTF |
| 1658 | 14th | Gospels† | 204 | Great Lavra Monastery, H' 82 | Mount Athos | Greece | INTF |
| 1659 | 14th | Gospels† | 246 | Great Lavra Monastery, H' 89 | Mount Athos | Greece | INTF |
| 1660 | 14th | Gospels† | 177 | Great Lavra Monastery, H' 159 | Mount Athos | Greece | INTF |
| 1661 | 14th | Gospels†, Acts†, General Epistles†, Pauline Epistles† | 173 | Great Lavra Monastery, H' 163 | Mount Athos | Greece | INTF |
| 1662 | 10th | Matthew†, Mark† Luke† | 124 | St. Panteleimon Monastery, 8 | Mount Athos | Greece | INTF |
| 1663 | 10th | Gospels† | 271 | St. Panteleimon Monastery, 9 | Mount Athos | Greece | INTF |
| 1664 | 13th | Gospels | 195 | St. Panteleimon Monastery, 10 | Mount Athos | Greece | INTF |
| 1665 | 12th | Gospels | 245 | St. Panteleimon Monastery, 11 | Mount Athos | Greece | INTF |
| 1666 | 13th | Gospels† | 288 | St. Panteleimon Monastery, 13 | Mount Athos | Greece | INTF |
| 1667 | 1309 | Gospels | 232 | St. Panteleimon Monastery, 14 | Mount Athos | Greece | INTF |
| 1668 | 11th | Gospels†, Acts†, General Epistles†, Pauline Epistles† | 184 | St. Panteleimon Monastery, 15 | Mount Athos | Greece | INTF |
| 1669 | 12th | Mark†, Luke† | 89 | St. Panteleimon Monastery, 16 | Mount Athos | Greece | INTF |
| 1670 | 14th | Gospels† | 174 | St. Panteleimon Monastery, 34 | Mount Athos | Greece | INTF |
| 1671 | 14th | Gospels | 226 | St. Panteleimon Monastery, 35 | Mount Athos | Greece | INTF |
| 1672 | 11th | Gospels † | 220 | St. Panteleimon Monastery, 36 | Mount Athos | Greece | INTF |
| 1672 | 11th | Gospels † | 16 | Vernadsky National Library, F. 310 (Samml. Nejin), 151 | Kyiv | Ukraine | INTF |
| 1673 | 12th | Luke† - Hebrews† | 152 | St. Panteleimon Monastery, 94 | Mount Athos | Greece | INTF |
| 1674 | 16th | Gospel of John^{P} | 1 | St. Panteleimon Monastery, 97a, Nr. 3 | Mount Athos | Greece | INTF |
| 1675 | 14th | Matthew† 2:5-28:20, Mark, Luke, John | 225 | St. Panteleimon Monastery, 101 | Mount Athos | Greece | INTF |
| 1676 | 1354 | Gospels | 224 | St. Panteleimon Monastery, 176 | Mount Athos | Greece | INTF |
| 1677 | 13th | Theophylact Commentary on the Gospels† | 390 | St. Panteleimon Monastery, 271 | Mount Athos | Greece | INTF |
| 1678 | 14th | Theophylact and Zigabenus Commentary on the New Testament | 334 | St. Panteleimon Monastery, 770 | Mount Athos | Greece | INTF |
| 1679 | 15th | Gospels† | 172 | St. Panteleimon Monastery, 771 | Mount Athos | Greece | INTF |
| 1680 | 16th | Gospels | 229 | St. Panteleimon Monastery, 1061 | Mount Athos | Greece | INTF |
| 1681 | 12th | Matthew, Mark, Luke | ? | Xenophontos Monastery, Ia' ? | Mount Athos | Greece | |
| 1682 | 16th | Matthew, Mark, Luke | 226 | Vlatades Monastery, 58 | Thessaloniki | Greece | INTF |
| 1683 | 12th | Gospel of Luke | 41 | Vlatades Monastery, 82 | Thessaloniki | Greece | INTF |
| 1684 | 11th | Gospels | 246 | Center for Slavic and Byzantine Studies, 177 | Sofia | Bulgaria | INTF |
| 1685 | 13th | Gospels, Revelation | 230 | Byzantine and Christian Museum, 155 | Athens | Greece | INTF |
| 1685 | 13th | Gospels, Revelation | 230 | Byzantine and Christian Museum, 155 | Athens | Greece | CSNTM |
| 1686 | 1418 | Gospels | 344 | National Library, 2603 | Athens | Greece | CSNTM |
| 1687 | 12th | Gospels | 281 | Byzantine and Christian Museum 156 | Athens | Greece | INTF |
| 1687 | 12th | Gospels | 281 | Byzantine and Christian Museum 156 | Athens | Greece | CSNTM |
| 1688 | 14th | Gospels | 184 | Byzantine and Christian Museum 157 | Athens | Greece | INTF |
| 1689 | 1200 | Gospels | 197 | Academy of Sciences of the Czech Republic 1 TG 3 | Prague | Czech Republic | INTF, CSNTM |
| 1690 | 15th | Gospels | 314 | National Library, 2495 | Athens | Greece | CSNTM |
| 1691 | 11th | Gospels | 265 | National Library, 2507 | Athens | Greece | CSNTM |
| 1691 | 11th | Gospels | 265 | National Library, 2507 | Athens | Greece | CSNTM (1) |
| 1692 | 12th | Gospels | 231 | National Library, 2423 | Athens | Greece | CSNTM |
| 1692 | 12th | Gospels | 231 | National Library, 2423 | Athens | Greece | INTF |
| 1693 | 11th | Gospels | 268 | Princeton University Library, Scheide MS.1 | Princeton | USA | INTF |
| 1694 | 13th | Gospels | 304 | National Library, 2510 | Athens | Greece | CSNTM |
| 1695 | 1311 | Gospels | 248 | National Library, 2499 | Athens | Greece | CSNTM |
| 1695 | 1311 | Gospels | 248 | National Library, 2499 | Athens | Greece | INTF |
| 1696 | 12th | Gospels | 257 | Timiou Prodromou Monastery | Serres | Greece | |
| 1696 | 12th | Gospels | 1 | Walters Art Museum, Ms. W. 530a | Baltimore, MD | USA | WAM |
| 1697 | 13th | Gospels | 234 | National Library, 2509 | Athens | Greece | CSNTM |
| 1698 | 14th | Gospels† | 238 | National Library, 2508 | Athens | Greece | CSNTM |
| 1699 | 1359 | Gospels | 299 | National Library, 2606 | Athens | Greece | CSNTM |
| 1700 | 1623 | Gospels | 231 | National Library, 2408 | Athens | Greece | CSNTM |

[top]

== See also ==
- List of New Testament papyri
- List of New Testament uncials
- List of New Testament minuscules (1–1000)
- List of New Testament minuscules (1001–2000)
- List of New Testament minuscules (2001–)
- List of New Testament minuscules ordered by Location/Institution
- List of New Testament lectionaries

== Bibliography ==
- Aland, Kurt; M. Welte; B. Köster; K. Junack (1994). Kurzgefasste Liste der griechischen Handschriften des Neues Testaments. Berlin, New York: Walter de Gruyter. p. 95. ISBN 3-11-011986-2.
- "Liste Handschriften". Münster: Institute for New Testament Textual Research.
