= Patriarchal Stavropegic Monastery of St John the Baptist =

Orthodox monastery in Tolleshunt Knights, Essex

Coordinates: 51.79568°N 0.78247°E

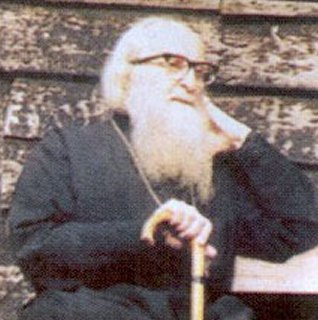
Saint Sophrony of Essex

The Patriarchal Stavropegic Monastery of St John the Baptist is a monastic community for men and women, directly under the Ecumenical Patriarchate. It is located in Tolleshunt Knights, near Maldon, Essex, in England, and is the oldest Orthodox religious community in the United Kingdom.

It was founded in 1958 by St Sophrony of Essex, under the jurisdiction of Metropolitan Anthony, the Metropolitan of Sourozh and ruling Russian Orthodox bishop in England, with six monastics from a number of nations; in 1965 the monastery moved under the direct jurisdiction of the Ecumenical Patriarchate.

The entrance gate of the Monastery

The community is a double monastery with both monks and nuns in separate residential quarters. This is rare in Orthodox monasticism.

Hegoumenos is Archimandrite Petros Vrizas.

== History ==
The Patriarchal Stavropegic Monastery of St John the Baptist had its beginnings largely in the person of St Sophrony of Essex. After his departure from Mount Athos, where he had been a disciple of Saint Silouan the Athonite, and his subsequent move to Paris, he was to live in a Russian old-people's home, assisting the priest there. Soon, two men would seek out St Sophrony, desiring the monastic life. They were allowed to live at the old-people's home, using the repetition of the Jesus Prayer in lieu of liturgical books and eating the food that the old-age inhabitants did not eat. There were also a few nuns living at the home at this time.

By 1958, St Sophrony had six people living around him, seeking the monastic life. Realising that such a situation could not continue, he went to Tolleshunt Knights, near Maldon, Essex, England, to inspect a property; in early 1959, the new Community of St John the Baptist was formed at the same property, under Metropolitan Anthony's omophorion. The monastery, from its beginnings, had both monks and nuns, due to Elder Sophrony being unable to oversee two separate communities.

Monastery church - Katholikon

The Monastery of St John the Baptist moved under the omophorion of the Ecumenical Patriarchate in 1965, becoming patriarchal; later, the monastery would also be titled Stavropegic.

=== Death of St Sophrony ===
The monastery had been informed that the only way that it could bury people on its property was to build an underground crypt, which it proceeded to build, and to which St Sophrony said that he would not repose until the crypt was ready. Then, having been told of the expected completion date of 12 July 1993, Elder Sophrony stated that he "would be ready". On 11 July, St Sophrony died; and his funeral and burial were held three days later, attended by monastics from around the world. Mother Elizabeth, the eldest nun, died soon after on 24 July, according to Elder Sophrony's words that he would die first, and she would die soon after.

== Notable inhabitants ==
- Sophrony Sakharov, founder

== See also ==
- Fahr Convent
