= Palaiochori, Chalkidiki =

Palaiochori Παλαιοχώρι
- Community
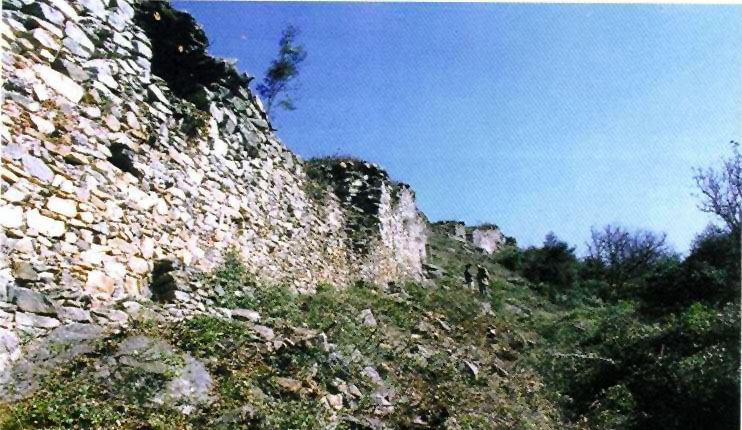
- Neposi castle

- Location within Greece
- Coordinates: 40°29′30″N 23°38′57″E
- Country: Greece
- Administrative region: Central Macedonia
- Regional unit: Chalkidiki
- Municipality: Aristotelis
- Municipal unit: Arnaia

Population (2021)
  - Community: 1,262
- Time zone: UTC+2 (EET)
  - Summer (DST): UTC+3 (EEST)

Palaiochori (Greek: Παλαιοχώρι) is a village in Chalkidiki, Greece, part of the municipality Aristotelis. It is situated between the villages Neochori (3 km, E), Megali Panagia (7 km, N) and Arnaia (5 km, W).

== History ==
The Neposi Castle was built in the 5th century.

The village is mentioned in a text from 1320 and 1441 (Actes de Xeropotamou, Archives de L'Athos III, ed. J. Bompaire.-Paris:1964). From 1478 to 1568 the population increased from c. 24 to c. 100 families.

In 1793 the French ambassador in Thessaloniki Esprit-Marie Cousinéry visited Palaiochori as is documented in 3 pages of Voyage dans la Macédonie (ISBN 1421208806).

In the Greek War of Independence the village was destroyed by the Turks. In the Civil War the village was again destroyed on 14 August 1948 by communist rebels.

== Churches ==
- Pammegiston Taxiarchon with wallpaintings, a copy of the icon Panagia Gorgoepikoos (the original in the monastery Docheiariou in Athos) and an icon from the 16th century of Taxiarchis Michail, near the church also is the statue of Ioakeim III Megaloprepis
- Agios Athanasios Athonitis church, festival 5 July each year
- Archangelos Michail church with a wallpainting

== Persons ==
Most known is Giorgos Zorbas from Paleochori who inspired the author Nikos Kazantzakis to write his work Alexis Zorbas. Giorgos Zorbas was born in Kolyndros in Pieria before moving to Paleochori for work. (See the book of G. Anapliotis "Ο αληθινός Ζορμπάς και ο Ν. Καζαντζάκης" (The true Zorbas and Nikos Kazantzakis).

A central street is named after the leader of the Orthodox Church Bartholomew I who visited Paleochori in June 1999.
