= Silouan the Athonite =

Monk of Russian origin

Saint Silouan the Athonite
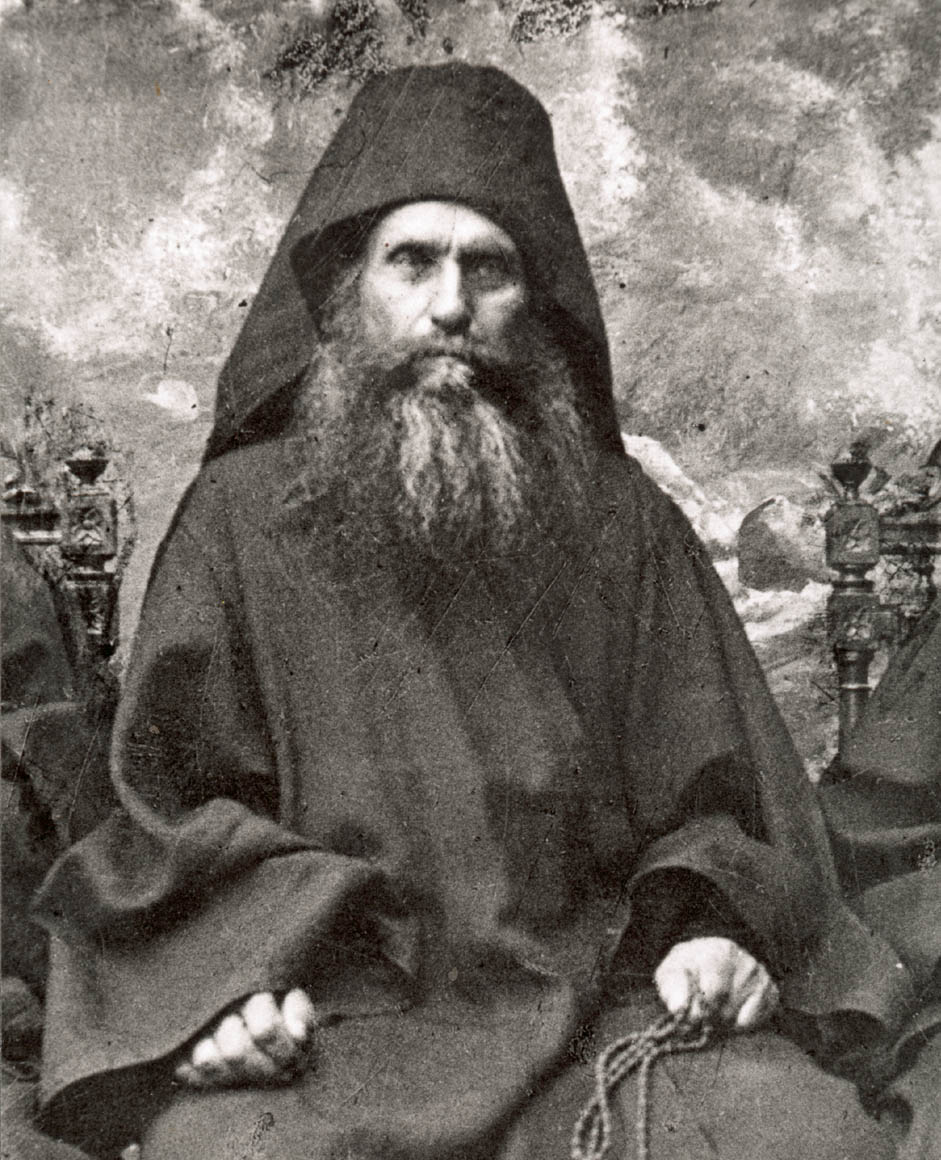

Venerable
- Born: January 17, 1866; Shovskoye village, Lebedyan County, Tambov Governorate, Russian Empire
- Died: September 24, 1938 (aged 72); Saint Panteleimon Monastery, Mount Athos, Greece
- Venerated in: Eastern Orthodox Church
- Canonized: 1987/1988 and 1992 by the Ecumenical Patriarchate of Constantinople and Holy Synod of the Russian Orthodox Church respectively
- Feast: September 24 (NS) 11 (OS)

Silouan the Athonite (Russian: Силуан Афонский, romanized: Siluan Afonskiy; January 17, 1866 – September 24, 1938) also sometimes referred to as Silouan of Athos, Saint Silvanus the Athonite or Staretz Silouan was an Eastern Orthodox monk of Russian origin, who was a poet and monk of the St. Panteleimon Monastery.

The life and teachings of Saint Silouan were brought to light by his disciple, Archimandrite Sophrony (Sakharov), in his classic book Saint Silouan the Athonite.

== Life ==
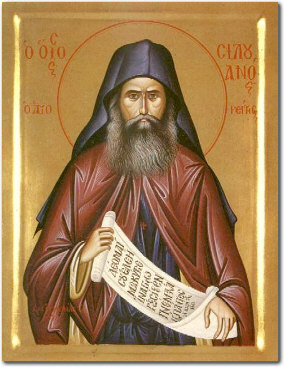
Icon of St. Silouan the Athonite

He was born as Simeon Ivanovich Antonov (Russian: Симеон Иванович Антонов), of Russian Orthodox parents who came from the village of Snovskoye in Imperial Russia's Tambov Governorate.

According to the biography compiled by Archimandrite Sophrony (Sakharov), Silouan of Athos worked in his youth as a carpenter in his brother's trade.

The heart of Silouan “ignited with love for God” after witnessing the miracles performed at the tomb of St. John of Sezenovski.

At the age of 27, after a period of military service in the Imperial Russian Army, he left his native Russia and came to the monastic state of Mount Athos (an autonomous peninsula in Greece) where he became a monk at the Monastery of St Panteleimon, known as "Rossikon": an Orthodox monastery that houses Russian monks. However, like all of the Athonite monasteries, the Russian monastery was under the jurisdiction of the Patriarch of Constantinople. There he was tonsured into the great schema and was given the name Silouan (the Russian version of the Biblical name Silvanus).

Silouan of Athos was physically strong and spent all his nights in prayer. According to residents, archeologists and pilgrims of Mount Athos, Silouan liked to pray on an oblong roadside stone, which has since been nicknamed “St. Silouan's Bench“. This stone lies on the side of the mountain path to this day. The first “obedience” of Silouan was to work at the mill.

An ardent ascetic, he received the grace of unceasing prayer and saw Christ in a vision. After long years of spiritual trial, he acquired great humility and inner stillness. He prayed and wept for the whole world as for himself, and he put the highest value on love for enemies. He became widely known as an elder. Silouan died on September 24, 1938. His memory is celebrated on September 24.

Though barely literate, he was sought out by pilgrims for his wise counsel. Silouan while still alive entrusted his writings to his disciple Father Sophrony, who was still a deacon at that time. Father Sophrony several years later travelled to Paris with the intention to publish the writings of his Elder. The first publication of his writings came out in Slavonic but very soon the book was translated into French and English as well as many more languages later.

The text Adam's lament is a poem written by Silouan contained in Part II - Chapter 18 of the book, Silouan the Athonite. The Estonian composer Arvo Pärt composed a classical choir piece with the lyrics based on this text.

Silouan of Athos was canonized as a Saint by the Ecumenical Patriarchate in either 1987 or 1988. The Moscow Patriarchate canonized Silouan in 1992.

== Teachings ==
Theologian John Zizioulas interpreted Silouan's humility and love of enemies as an identification with all humanity in its fallen condition. On this reading, compassion for others, including one's enemies, is not merely obedience to a moral command but participation in their condition; Silouan's asceticism therefore becomes participation in the suffering of the whole world rather than an individual spiritual achievement. Zizioulas connected this with Silouan's Christology, in which the experience of the Transfiguration is inseparable from the Cross.

== Troparion ==
Troparion — Tone 4

"On the path of humility, / by your prayers you received Christ as your Master. / In your heart the Holy Spirit witnessed to your salvation. / Therefore all people called to live in hope rejoice and celebrate your memory! / Holy Father Silouan, pray to Christ God to save our souls."
