= Antipas of Pergamum =

1st-century Christian bishop and martyr

Saint Antipas of Pergamum
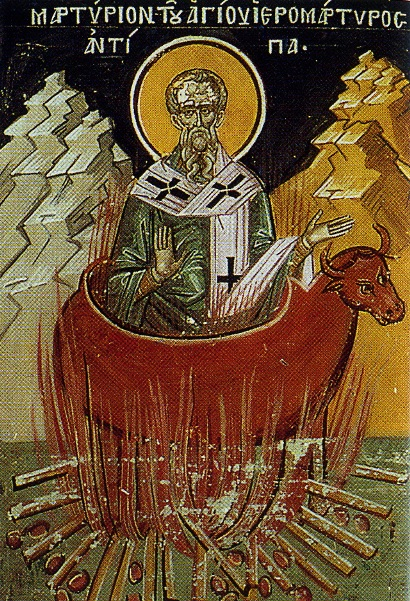
- Antipas being martyred

Martyr
- Born: unknown
- Died: AD 68 or 92; Pergamon, Asia Minor
- Venerated in: Catholic Church; Eastern Orthodox Church
- Feast: 11 April
- Patronage: against toothache

Saint Antipas was, according to the Commentary on the Apocalypse of Andreas of Caesarea, the Antipas referred to in Revelation 2:13, as the verse says: "I know thy works, and where thou dwellest, even where Satan's seat is: and thou holdest fast my name, and hast not denied my faith, even in those days wherein Antipas was my faithful martyr, who was slain among you, where Satan dwelleth." According to Christian tradition, John the Apostle ordained Antipas as bishop of Pergamon during the reign of the Roman emperor Nero. The traditional accounts go on to say Antipas was martyred during the reign of Nero (54-68) or Domitian, by burning in a brazen bull-shaped altar for casting out demons worshipped by the local population.

There is a tradition of holy oil ("manna of the saints") being secreted from the relics of Saint Antipas.

Saint Antipas is invoked for relief from toothache, and diseases of the teeth. On the calendars of Eastern Christianity, the feast day of Antipas is April 11.
