= George Zorbas =

Greek miner, basis of Zorba the Greek

- Γεώργιoς Ζορμπάς
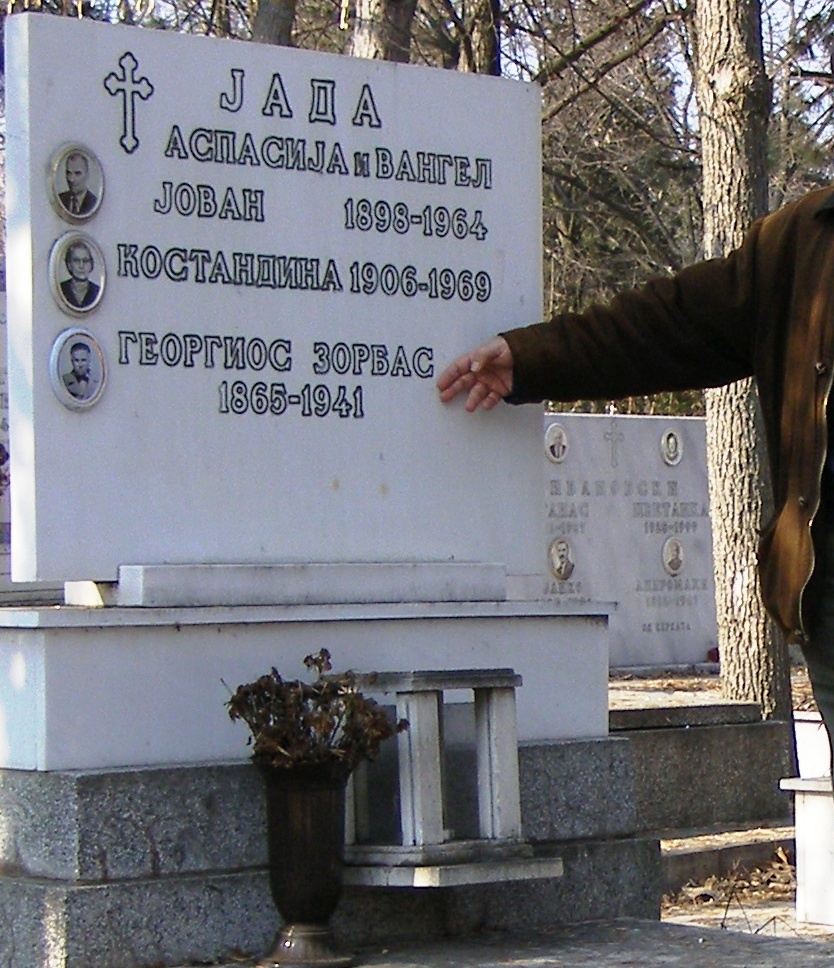
- The grave of Zorbas in Skopje
- Born: Georgios Zorbas; 1865; Katafygio, Ottoman Empire (present-day Greece)
- Died: September 16, 1941 (aged 75–76); Skopie, Kingdom of Bulgaria (present-day North Macedonia)
- Occupation: Miner

Georgios Zorbas (Greek: Γεώργιoς Ζορμπάς; 1865 – September 16, 1941) was a Greek miner upon whom Nikos Kazantzakis based Alexis Zorbas, the protagonist of his 1946 novel Zorba the Greek.

== Biography ==
Georgios Zorbas was born in 1865 at Katafygio village in Pieria Mountain, then in the Ottoman Empire. His full name, father's name, year and place of birth are documented in the registry book of Katafygio, which is preserved today. He was the son of Photios Zorbas, a wealthy landowner and sheep-owner and had three siblings; a sister, Katerina, and two brothers, Ioannis and Xenophon. His family had its roots in Kolindros, but after a conflict with the local Ottoman rulers, his father decided to move them to Katafygio. He worked in his fields and flocks at Katafygi, became a woodcutter, and later left for Palaiochori, Chalkidiki, where he spent the most decisive years of his life, 1889–1911. He worked as a miner for a French company in Stratoniki, Chalkidiki and became friends with the foreman, Giannis Kalkounis (Γιάννης Καλκούνης). He eloped with Kalkounis's daughter Eleni and eventually had eight children. By the end of this period, war and the death of his wife brought great unhappiness to his family.

After all this, he left Palaiochori for Eleftherohori, Pieria, only 8 km from Kolindros, where his brother Ioannis, a doctor, lived. In 1915, he decided to become a monk and left for Mount Athos. It was there that he met Nikos Kazantzakis and they become close friends. They went to Mani together, where they worked as miners in Prastova. It was their experiences there that Kazantzakis later wrote into The Life and Times of Alexis Zorbas (Βίος και πολιτεία του Αλέξη Ζορμπά) which is a fictionalized version of the life of Zorbas. It was later translated as Zorba the Greek and also adapted into Zorba musical (1968) and an Academy Award-nominated film, Zorba the Greek (1964), wherein his role was played by Anthony Quinn.

His life continued in the Kingdom of Yugoslavia, where he settled in 1922 with his 10-year-old daughter, Katerina. Zorbas bought mines near Niš and near Skopje and began to deal in mining. In 1940, Katerina married a wealthy merchant, with whom she went to live in Belgrade.

Zorbas himself died on September 16, 1941, and was buried in the cemetery of Vodno (quarter) near Skopje, then part of the Kingdom of Bulgaria). Because of the change of urban plans, the bones of Zorbas were transferred in 1954 to the Butel cemetery (P-17), near Skopje.

His great-grandson was rock musician Pavlos Sidiropoulos.
