= Zorba the Greek (film) =

1964 film by Michael Cacoyannis

- Original film poster
- Directed by: Michael Cacoyannis
- Screenplay by: Michael Cacoyannis
- Based on: Zorba the Greek; 1946 novel by Nikos Kazantzakis
- Produced by: Michael Cacoyannis
- Starring: Anthony Quinn; Alan Bates; Irene Papas; Lila Kedrova; Sotiris Moustakas; Anna Kyriakou
- Cinematography: Walter Lassally
- Edited by: Michael Cacoyannis
- Music by: Mikis Theodorakis
- Distributed by: 20th Century Fox; International Classics
- Release dates: 14 December 1964 (Greece); 17 December 1964 (New York City)
- Running time: 142 minutes
- Countries: United States; United Kingdom; Greece
- Languages: English; Greek
- Budget: $783,000
- Box office: $23.5 million

Zorba the Greek (Greek: Αλέξης Ζορμπάς, Alexis Zorbas) is a 1964 drama film written, produced, edited, and directed by Greek Cypriot filmmaker Michael Cacoyannis. It stars Anthony Quinn as Zorba, an earthy and boisterous Cretan peasant, and Alan Bates as Basil, the buttoned-up young intellectual he befriends. The cast also includes Lila Kedrova, Irene Papas, and Sotiris Moustakas. The musical score was composed by Mikis Theodorakis. The film is based on the 1946 novel The Life and Times of Alexis Zorba by Nikos Kazantzakis.

The film centers on Zorba and Basil's misadventures in trying to build a lignite mine through an impoverished Cretan village, as their polar different personalities lead them into affairs and schemes that end unexpectedly. Much of the film's interactions focus on the lead characters' views and attitudes, culminating in the final scene where they dance joyfully before parting ways.

Though the film has elements of comedy, and Kazantzakis's anti-hero Zorba has been generally understood as a 'life-affirming' personality (faithfully reproduced in Cacoyannis's screenplay), it features a gruesome murder, and Zorba's cynical, egotistical and manipulative personality combined with his determined optimism is explicitly shown to be a response to, and in defiance of, the cruelties and vicissitudes of life.

Produced in Greece for under $1 million, Zorba was a considerable critical and commercial success, grossing over nine times its production budget at the U.S. box office alone. At the 37th Academy Awards, the film won awards for Best Supporting Actress (Kedrova), Best Cinematography and Best Art Direction. Other nominations included Best Picture, Best Director, and Best Actor for Anthony Quinn, whose performance also popularized the folk dance known as the sirtaki. The film and its source novel were later adapted into a Tony-winning stage musical, in which Cacoyannis, Quinn, and Kedrova all participated.

== Plot ==
Basil is an unadventurous middle-class Greek-British writer raised in the United Kingdom. While at the Athens port of Piraeus waiting to travel to Crete, he meets a peasant and musician named Zorba. Basil explains that he is travelling to a Cretan village with the intention of re-opening a lignite mine and perhaps curing his writer's block. Zorba explains that he has experience as a miner and inveigles himself a position as Basil's foreman and handyman.

When they arrive at the village, they are greeted enthusiastically by the impoverished people. They lodge with an elderly French former cabaret dancer named Madame Hortense in her self-styled "Hotel Ritz". Hortense relates her past as a courtesan among the competing Mediterranean powers, hinting that she was the lover of an Italian admiral named Cannavaro (which she has named her pet parrot). Zorba tries to persuade Basil to enter into a relationship with Hortense, but he refuses. Zorba charms Hortense instead.

Among the village residents is a young, widowed woman who is resented by the villagers for not remarrying. A local boy Pavlo is madly in love with her, but she rejects him. One rainy afternoon, Basil offers her his umbrella, which she reluctantly takes. Zorba suggests that she is attracted to him, but Basil shyly refuses to pursue her.

Over the next few days, Basil and Zorba work the old lignite mine, but it collapses and Zorba narrowly avoids injury. He then has an idea to use the forest in the nearby mountains to source lumber and replace the rotten timbers. The land is owned by a monastery. Zorba tricks the monks into believing that a miracle has occurred, as part of a ploy to get them to give up the timber. Exultant, when he gets home, he dances the sirtaki. Zorba later designs a system for timber to be sent down the mountain via a wire.

To get supplies to build the zip-wire for timber, Basil gives Zorba some money and sends him to the port of Chania to buy supplies. Instead, Zorba gets drunk, visits a cabaret, and spends money on presents, champagne, and a dancer with whom he spends the night. He dyes his hair to feel more youthful. Angered, Basil lies to Madame Hortense, who is smitten with Zorba but feels abandoned, that Zorba intends to marry her upon his return, exciting her. Mimithos, the village idiot, returns Basil's umbrella. Basil, while drunk, goes to the widow's house. They spend the night together, which is discovered by the jealous men of the village.

When Zorba returns with supplies and gifts, he is surprised and angered by Basil's lie to Hortense. Word spreads of Basil's visit to the widow. The men of the village tell Pavlo, whereupon he drowns himself. When the widow attempts to attend the church funeral, she is blocked by Pavlo's father. The villagers blame her for his suicide, and some men corral her outside the church and begin to stone her, encouraged by the villagers. Basil, unable to push through the crowd, sends Mimithos to find Zorba. Zorba arrives just as the villager who informed Pavlo is about to stab the widow. Zorba disarms him but, when he asks the widow to follow him and turns to go, Pavlo's father cuts the widow's throat. The villagers close around the father and his accomplices, shielding them as they all disperse, leaving only the outsiders, Basil, Zorba, and a distraught Mimithos. Basil laments his inability to intervene, and Zorba angrily laments the meaninglessness of death. The film cuts to a scene in which Basil, Zorba and the villagers construct the zip-wire system.

On a rainy day, Basil and Zorba come home and find Madame Hortense waiting. She expresses anger at Zorba for making no progress on their wedding. Zorba conjures up a story that he had ordered a beautiful wedding dress. Madame Hortense presents two golden rings she made and proposes their immediate engagement. Zorba tries to stall but eventually agrees.

Later, Madame Hortense contracts pneumonia and is on her deathbed. Zorba and Basil stay by her side. Word spreads that "the foreigner" is dying, and since she has no heirs, the State will take her assets. The villagers crowd around her hotel, waiting for her demise so they can steal her belongings. Zorba fends off women who manage to enter. At the instant of her death, the women re-enter Madame Hortense's bedroom en masse to steal her possessions. Zorba leaves as the hotel is ransacked. When Zorba returns to Madame Hortense's bedroom, the room is barren apart from her bed, body, and pet parrot. Zorba takes the bird with him.

Finally, Zorba's contraption to transport timber is complete. A festive ceremony is held, including roasted lamb and wine, and all the villagers attend. After a blessing from the priests, Zorba fires a rifle in the air and a log is sent down the zip line but at excessive speed, destroying the log and slightly damaging the contraption. Zorba, unconcerned, gives orders for a second log. This one also comes down too quickly and overshoots into the sea. The villagers grow fearful and head for cover. Zorba remains unfazed and signals for the third log, which accelerates so quickly that it destroys the entire contraption. The villagers and monks flee in terror, leaving only Basil and Zorba amidst the wreckage.

They sit by the shore to eat the roasted lamb and drink the wine alone. Zorba pretends to tell the future from a lamb bone, saying that he foresees a great journey to a big city. He asks Basil when he plans to leave, and Basil replies that he will go in a few days. Zorba says the one thing Basil is missing is the element of 'madness' that enables a man to 'break free'. They begin to laugh hysterically at the catastrophic outcome of their scheme and the effect on the villagers. Basil asks Zorba to teach him to dance, and both men perform the sirtaki on the deserted shore.

== Cast ==
- Anthony Quinn as Alexis Zorba (Greek: Αλέξης Ζορμπάς), a fictionalized version of the mine worker George Zorbas (Greek: Γιώργης Ζορμπάς 1867–1941)
- Alan Bates as Basil
- Irene Papas as the Widow
- Lila Kedrova as Madame Hortense
- Sotiris Moustakas as Mimithos
- Anna Kyriakou as Soul
- Eleni Anousaki as Lola
- George Voyadjis as Pavlo
- Takis Emmanuel as Manolakas
- George Foundas as Mavrandoni
- Pia Lindström (deleted scenes) as Peasant girl

== Production ==
The film was shot in black and white on location on the Greek island of Crete. Specific locations featured include the city of Chania, the village of Kokkino Chorio in the Apokoronas region and Stavros Beach in the Akrotiri peninsula. The scene in which Quinn's character dances the Sirtaki was filmed on the beach of the village of Stavros.

Simone Signoret began filming the role of Madame Hortense; Lila Kedrova replaced her early in the production.

== Reception ==
=== Box office ===
The film was a commercial success. Produced on a budget of only $783,000, it grossed $9 million at the U.S. box office, earning $4.4 million in U.S. theatrical rentals. At the worldwide box office, the film earned $9.4 million in rentals, placing the worldwide gross between $18.8 million and $23.5 million. It was the 17th highest-grossing film of 1964.

According to Fox Records, the film needed to earn $3,000,000 in rentals to break even and made $9,400,000. By September 1970 it earned the studio an estimated profit of $2,565,000.

=== Critical response ===
Reviews of the film were generally positive, with Anthony Quinn and Lila Kedrova receiving numerous accolades for their performances, although a few critics found fault with the screenplay. Bosley Crowther of The New York Times lauded Quinn for a "brilliant performance" and Kedrova for her "brilliantly realized" character, citing the only real weakness of the film as a lack of "significant conflict to prove its dominant character. Zorba is powerful and provocative, but nobody gets in his way." Margaret Harford of the Los Angeles Times declared that the film would "stand among the year's best motion pictures, an unusual, engrossing effort" with spots both "outrageously funny" and "painfully sad and tragic."

Richard L. Coe of The Washington Post deemed it "a memorable picture" with a "bravura performance" from Quinn, adding that "Lila Kedrova as the dying Mme Hortense is spectacularly touching." Variety found the film excessively long (at around two hours and thirty minutes) and overstuffed, writing that Cacoyannis's screenplay was "packed with incidents of varying moods, so packed, in fact, that some of the more important ones cannot be developed fully." Brendan Gill of The New Yorker wrote that Cacoyannis had directed the film with "enormous verve" but had written a "not very tidy, not very plausible screenplay." Gill particularly praised Kedrova's performance and thought that she "comes within an ace of stealing the picture from Quinn." The Monthly Film Bulletin wrote that the film began well, but by the time the characters went to Crete "the pace slows to a crawl, and the narrative line becomes blurred in a series of unrelated incidents of doubtful significance." The review concluded that for all its length, "the film never gets down to a clear statement of its theme, or comes within measuring the distance of its vast pretensions."

On the review aggregator website Rotten Tomatoes, 80% of 15 critics' reviews are positive, with an average rating of 7.8/10. On both sides of the Atlantic, Zorba was applauded and Quinn came in for the best reviews. He was lauded as Zorba, along with the other stars, including Greek-born Papas, who worked with Quinn on The Guns of Navarone.

=== Awards and nominations ===
Award	Category	Nominee	Result
Academy Award	Best Picture	Michael Cacoyannis	Nominated
Academy Award	Best Director	Michael Cacoyannis	Nominated
Academy Award	Best Adapted Screenplay	Michael Cacoyannis	Nominated
Academy Award	Best Actor	Anthony Quinn	Nominated
Academy Award	Best Supporting Actress	Lila Kedrova	Won
Academy Award	Best Art Direction (Black-and-White)	Vassilis Photopoulos	Won
Academy Award	Best Cinematography (Black-and-White)	Walter Lassally	Won
BAFTA Award	Best Film from any Source	Michael Cacoyannis	Nominated
BAFTA Award	Best Foreign Actor	Anthony Quinn	Nominated
BAFTA Award	Best Foreign Actress	Lila Kedrova	Nominated
Golden Globe Award	Best Motion Picture – Drama		Nominated
Golden Globe Award	Best Director	Michael Cacoyannis	Nominated
Golden Globe Award	Best Actor – Motion Picture Drama	Anthony Quinn	Nominated
Golden Globe Award	Best Supporting Actress – Motion Picture	Lila Kedrova	Nominated
Golden Globe Award	Best Original Score	Mikis Theodorakis	Nominated
Grammy Award	Best Score Soundtrack for Visual Media	Mikis Theodorakis	Nominated
National Board of Review	Top Ten Films		Won
National Board of Review	Best Actor	Anthony Quinn	Won

== Preservation ==
The Academy Film Archive preserved Zorba the Greek in 2004.

== See also ==
- "Zorbas", the theme song of the film by Greek composer Mikis Theodorakis
- Zorba (musical), a musical based on the book
