= Nicholas Afanasiev =

Nikolay Nikolayevich Afanasiev (Russian: Николай Николаевич Афанасьев; 4 September 1893, Odessa — 4 December 1966, Paris) was an Eastern Orthodox theologian who was ordinary professor of the St. Sergius Orthodox Theological Institute in Paris.

Afanasiev was born in Odessa, in the Russian Empire. He fought with the White Russian Army, and then studied in Czechoslovakia and Yugoslavia (obtaining a PhD from the University of Belgrade) before going to France. He lectured at St. Sergius for ten years before being ordained a priest in the Eastern Orthodox Church in 1940, whereupon he served in Tunisia until 1947. He then returned to St Sergius, where he served until his death.

Afanasiev's great contribution to Orthodox theology came in his conception of "eucharistic ecclesiology", in which he sought to derive the nature and theology of the church from the eucharistic assembly. His work was influential on Alexander Schmemann, John Meyendorff, Dumitru Stăniloae, and John Zizioulas.

A notable work is The Church of the Holy Spirit.

== Bibliography ==
- Трапеза Господня (1952)
- Служение мирян в Церкви (1955)
- Экклезиология вступления в клир (1997)
- Церковные соборы и их происхождение (2003)
- The Church of the Holy Spirit (University of Notre Dame Press, 2007) ISBN 9780268020422
