= Church of Saint Nicetas beyond the Yauza River =

Parish church in Moscow, Russia

Coordinates: 55.74575°N 37.644611°E

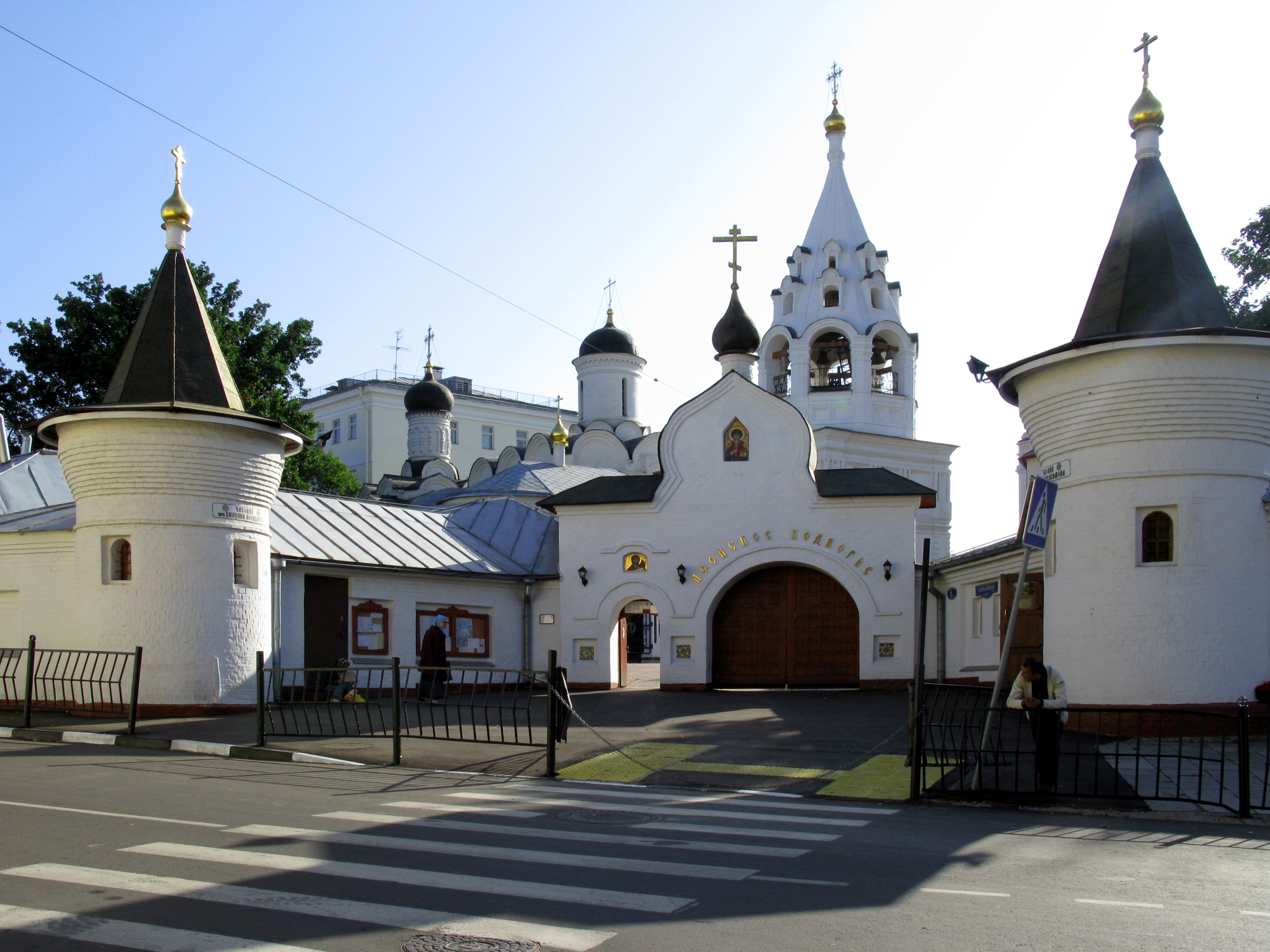
The Athonite metochion (mission) in downtown Moscow

Church of Saint Nicetas beyond the Yauza River (Храм Никиты Мученика за Яузой) is one of the oldest parish churches in Moscow, dating to as early as 1476. Standing on Shvivova Gorka, the eastern slope of Taganka Hill, this small single-dome church once commanded a famous view of Zamoskvorechye (now blocked by the Kotelnicheskaya Embankment Building).

The current church building, dating from 1595, stands on the older foundations. A tent-like belfry and large annex were added in 1685. The icon screen dates from the 1740s. The church has gone through more renovations in the 19th century but was restored to its original medieval appearance under the supervision of Leon David in the 1950s.

The church forms the nucleus of the Athonite metochion, a Moscow mission of the Rossikon Monastery on Mount Athos. Future Athonite monks reside there. The entrance is flanked by two tower-like chapels of recent construction, dedicated to St. Pantaleon and Silouan the Athonite, respectively.

== See also ==
- St. Nicetas
