= Zorba (musical) =

- Original Cast Recording
- Music: John Kander
- Lyrics: Fred Ebb
- Book: Joseph Stein
- Basis: Nikos Kazantzakis's novel Zorba the Greek
- Productions: 1968 Broadway; 1983 Broadway revival
- Awards: Drama Desk Award for Outstanding Lyrics

Zorba is a musical with a book by Joseph Stein, lyrics by Fred Ebb, and music by John Kander. Adapted from the 1946 novel Zorba the Greek by Nikos Kazantzakis and the subsequent 1964 film of the same name, it focuses on the friendship that evolves between Zorba and Nikos, a young American who has inherited an abandoned mine on Crete, and their romantic relationships with a French woman and a local widow, respectively.

The musical premiered on Broadway in 1968 in a production directed by Harold Prince. It was nominated for the Tony Award for Best Musical in a season that included Hair, Promises, Promises and 1776. The last of these won the award. The original production ran for 305 performances, and a 1983 Broadway revival ran for 362 performances with a cast starring Anthony Quinn.

== Synopsis ==
The musical follows Nikos, an unworldly young American who travels to Greece after inheriting a mine on Crete. He befriends the carefree and charismatic Zorba, who accompanies him and becomes his guide to the local community. As the two attempt to reopen the mine, Zorba begins a romance with the aging French courtesan Madame Hortense, while Nikos is drawn to a withdrawn young widow.

Their plans and relationships are overtaken by a series of tragedies. The community's hostility toward the Widow leads to suicide, murder, and a blood feud, while an accident destroys the partners' hopes for the mine. Despite their losses, Zorba urges Nikos to accept both the joy and suffering of life.

== Characters ==
- Nikos, a young American bachelor, coming to Greece to take over operations of a mine he has inherited.
- Alexis Zorba (Αλέξης Ζορμπάς), an eccentric and charismatic man in his late 50's who befriends Nikos on his trip. He is a fictionalized version of the mine worker George Zorbas (Γιώργης Ζορμπάς 1867–1942).
- The Leader, a narrator and guide to the audience and actors. The character was referred to as "the Woman" in the 1983 revival.
- Madame Hortense, a promiscuous French woman in her 50's who seduces Zorba.
- The Widow, a woman in her late 20's, begins a courtship with Nikos.
- Pavli, a man in the town who has hopes for a relationship with The Widow.
- Mavrodani, Pavli's father
- Manolakas, another man from the town. Mavrodani's brother, and Pavli's uncle.
- Mimiko, a young, poor man in the town who assists Nikos. The Widow takes care of him.
- Father Zahoria, a priest.

== Musical numbers ==
Act I

- "Life Is" – Leader and Company
- "The First Time" – Zorba
- "The Top of the Hill" – Leader and Chorus
- "No Boom Boom" – Madame Hortense, Zorba, Nikos and Admirals
- "Vive La Difference" – Admirals and Dancers
- "Mine Song" § – Company
- "The Butterfly" – Nikos, Leader, The Widow and Chorus
- "Goodbye, Canavaro" – Madame Hortense and Zorba
- "Grandpapa" – Zorba, Leader and Chorus
- "Only Love" – Madame Hortense
- "The Bend of the Road" – Leader and Chorus
- "Only Love" (Reprise) – Leader

Act II

- "Yassou" – Nikos, Zorba, Madame Hortense, Leader and Chorus
- "Woman" § – Zorba
- "Why Can't I Speak" / "That's a Beginning" – The Widow and Nikos
- "Easter Dance" § – Company
- "Miner's Dance" § – The Men
- "The Crow" – Leader and Women
- "Happy Birthday" – Madame Hortense
- "I Am Free" – Zorba
- "Life Is" (Reprise) – Leader and Company

§ = in 1983 revival

== Productions ==
Original Broadway Production

The musical opened on Broadway on November 16, 1968, at the Imperial Theatre, where it ran for 305 performances and twelve previews. Directed by Harold Prince and choreographed by Ron Field, the cast included Herschel Bernardi, Maria Karnilova, Carmen Alvarez, John Cunningham, and Lorraine Serabian. Scenic design was by Boris Aronson, costume design was by Patricia Zipprodt, and lighting design was by Richard Pilbrow. The production received several Tony Award nominations, winning the Tony Award for Best Scenic Design.

Music On Tour!

The musical was revised to be less "austere" and toured with John Raitt and included a new song for him ("Bouboulina") as well as the addition of "The First Time" sung by Nikos as part of "Why Can't I Speak." Chita Rivera played the role of "The Leader". Because reviews were not favorable, the show did not return to Broadway at that time.

The bus and truck tour featured Vivian Blaine ("Guys and Dolls") as Madame Hortense and Michael Kermoyan ("Camelot" & "Anya") in the title role, with Prince directing and choreography by Patricia Birch.

1976 (summer) Second National Tour

The second national tour started in Philadelphia in May 1976 and traveled all over the East Coast of the US and into Montreal, Canada (two weeks at Place des Arts after the Summer Olympics). The cast featured Theodore Bikel and Taina Elg. It was considered the best touring show of the "Straw Hat Circuit" that summer.

1983 Broadway Revival

The 1983 revival directed by Michael Cacoyannis and choreographed by Graciela Daniele opened on October 16, 1983, at the Broadway Theatre, where it ran for 362 performances and 14 previews. The cast included Anthony Quinn and Lila Kedrova (who had both starred in the film version, the latter winning an Oscar for her performance), in addition to Robert Westenberg, Debbie Shapiro, Jeff McCarthy and Rob Marshall. Kedrova would win the Tony Award for Best Featured Actress in a Musical for her reprise of Madame Hortense; it was the only role she ever played on Broadway as per the Internet Broadway Database (IBDB). Softening the production somewhat, the revival did not eventuate or reference the killing of the Widow.

The Cannon Group, Inc. had reportedly planned a film adaptation of the revival, which never materialized.

Concert production

Zorba was presented in the New York City Center Encores! staged concert series on May 6–10, 2015. The cast featured John Turturro, Zoe Wanamaker, and Marin Mazzie in the lead roles and direction by Walter Bobbie.

== Design Elements ==
Director Prince visited Crete and Mykonos, and the show's original design reflected the "peculiar color and light of the Greek Islands, the stark white of the...buildings as against the funereal black of the...clothes. Memorably 'Zorba' was presented in severe chiaroscuro."

== Reception ==
According to Sheldon Patinkin, the "material was too dark" and the "book too heavy" for a Broadway musical. "It includes a serious and often unpleasant commenting chorus, the death of the central female character, a suicide...and other depressing events. It didn't return its investment."

Clive Barnes in his review in The New York Times, wrote that "Prince was one of the very few creative producers on Broadway-a man who can put his own imprint on a show, and that imprint is planted all over Zorba like a sterling silver mark."

== Awards and nominations ==
=== Original Broadway production ===
Year	Award	Category	Nominee	Result
1969	Tony Award	Best Musical		Nominated
1969	Tony Award	Best Performance by a Leading Actor in a Musical	Herschel Bernardi	Nominated
1969	Tony Award	Best Performance by a Leading Actress in a Musical	Maria Karnilova	Nominated
1969	Tony Award	Best Performance by a Featured Actress in a Musical	Lorraine Serabian	Nominated
1969	Tony Award	Best Direction of a Musical	Harold Prince	Nominated
1969	Tony Award	Best Choreography	Ron Field	Nominated
1969	Tony Award	Best Scenic Design	Boris Aronson	Won
1969	Tony Award	Best Costume Design	Patricia Zipprodt	Nominated
1969	Drama Desk Award	Outstanding Lyrics	Fred Ebb	Won
1969	Drama Desk Award	Outstanding Set Design	Boris Aronson	Won
1969	Drama Desk Award	Outstanding Costume Design	Patricia Zipprodt	Won

=== 1983 Broadway revival ===
Year	Award	Category	Nominee	Result
1984	Tony Award	Best Performance by a Featured Actress in a Musical	Lila Kedrova	Won
1984	Drama Desk Award	Outstanding Featured Actress in a Musical	Lila Kedrova	Won
1984	Theatre World Award		Robert Westenberg	Won
