= Adam's Lament (Pärt) =

2009 musical composition by Arvo Pärt

- by Arvo Pärt
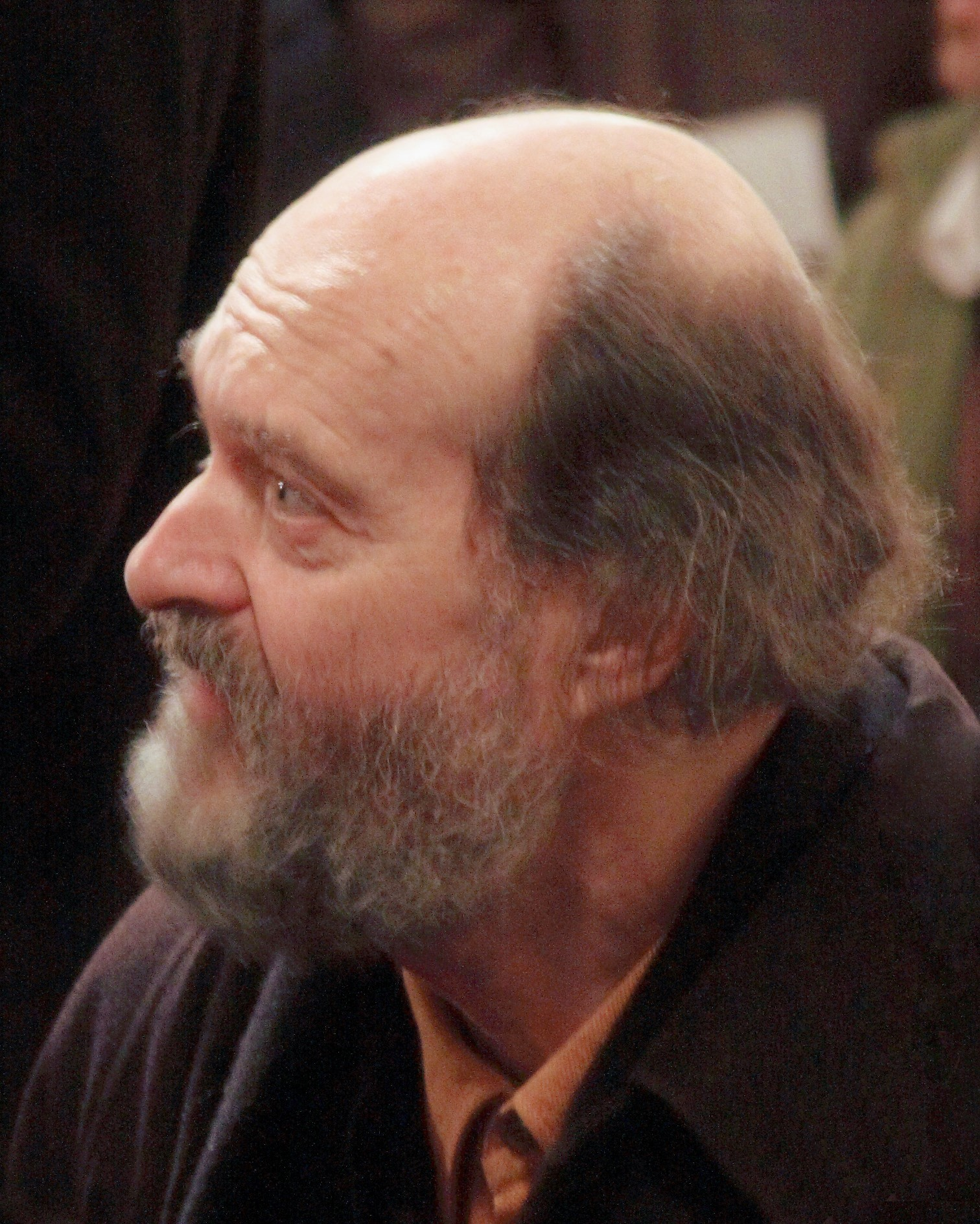
- Pärt in 2008
- Text: by Silouan of Athos
- Language: Russian
- Composed: 2009
- Scoring: SATB choir and orchestra

Adam's Lament (Russian: Адамов плач Adamov plach) is a 2009 choral composition in Russian by Estonian composer Arvo Pärt. The lyrics were inspired by the chapter Adam's Lament found in the book Saint Silouan the Athonite. The work is scored for choir and orchestra, and is a setting of the words of Saint Silouan. Pärt has been reported to say that the fallen Adam of the work represents "humankind in its entirety and each individual person alike".

== Text ==
The poem by Silouan begins:

"Адам, отец вселенной, в Раю знал сладость любвьи Божией,
И потому, когда был изгнан из Рая за грех и лишился любвьи Божией,
Горько страдал и с великим стоном рыдал на всю пустыню."

"Adam, otets vselennoy, v rayu znal sladost' lyubvi Bozhiyey, i potomu, kogda byl izgnan iz raya za grekh i lishilsya lyubvi Bozhiyey, gor'ko stradal i s velikim stonom rydal na vsyu pustynyu."

"Adam, father of all mankind, in paradise knew the sweetness of the love of God; and so when for his sin he was driven forth from the garden of Eden, and was widowed of the love of God, he suffered grievously and lamented with a mighty moan. And the whole desert rang with his lamentations." (Translated by Rosemary Edmonds.)
