= Metropolis of Pergamon =

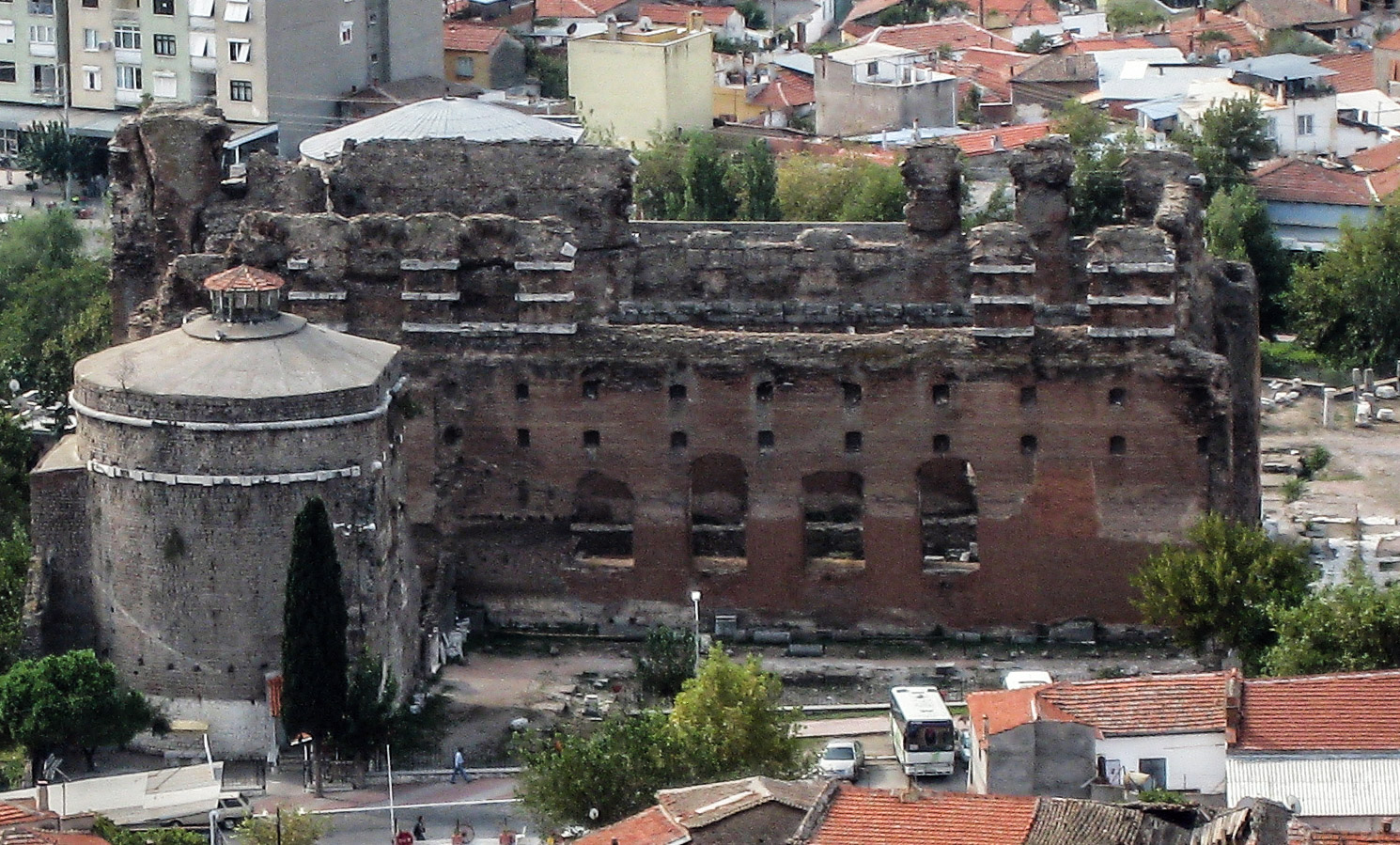
North view of the Red Basilica, Pergamon

The Metropolis of Pergamon (Greek: Μητρόπολις Περγάμου) was an ecclesiastical territory (diocese) of the Ecumenical Patriarchate of Constantinople in western Asia Minor, modern Turkey. Christianity in the city of Pergamon (modern Bergama), was introduced already from 1st century AD, while the local Christian community comprised one of the seven Churches of Asia mentioned at the Book of Revelation, written by John of Patmos. The bishopric of Pergamon was twice promoted to a metropolis: during the 13th–14th centuries, as well as for a short period in 1922. Today the Metropolis of Pergamon and Adramyttium is a titular see.

== History ==
=== From early Christianity to 15th century ===
The Christian community of Pergamon was one of the earliest established in Asia Minor during the 1st century AD. It also comprised one of the Seven Churches of Asia mentioned at the New Testament Book of Revelation, written by John the Apostle. According to the Christian tradition, Antipas was appointed bishop of Pergamon, by John. He was martyred there in 92 AD. Pergamon became the see of a bishopric under the jurisdiction of the Metropolis of Ephesus.

During the 13th century the local bishopric was promoted to a metropolis. However, it soon ceased to exist as a result of the Turkish conquest of the area in the 1310s, the subsequent decline of the local Christian population and the later destruction of Pergamon by the hordes of Timur. By 1387, the metropolis of Pergamon was assumed by Ephesus, due to their shared decline. By the 15th century, the metropolis of Pergamon had disappeared from the records.

=== Revival ===
At the beginning of the 19th century, due to the increase of the local Christian population, a number of reforms in religious administration occurred in the region and Pergamon became part of the newly established metropolitan district of Kydonies, based in Ayvalık, but still part of the Metropolis of Ephesus. In 1908, the former metropolitan district was promoted to a diocese and in 1905 its see was transferred to Pergamon (Bergama).

In February 1922, while most of the region was part of the Greek-controlled Smyrna Zone, the metropolis of Pergamon and Adramyttium was established as part of the general reforms in local religious administration. However, following the developments of the Greco-Turkish War of 1919–1922 and the subsequent population exchange between Greece and Turkey, the remaining Orthodox population was forced to leave the area.

During the years 1986–2023, the titular metropolitan of Pergamon and Adramyttium appointed by the Ecumenical Patriarchate of Constantinople was the famous theologian John Zizioulas.

== Geography ==
In terms of Ottoman administration, the area of the diocese of Pergamon, during the end of the 19th and the start of 20th century, included the kaymakamlıks of Bergama, Edremit (Adramyttium) and Kemer, as well as a number of villages in the kaymakamlık of Manisa. At that period, 33 Greek Orthodox communities were recorded, while the local Greek-Orthodox population at the early 20th century was estimated to 32,930 people and 31 priests.

== Titular bishop - modern era ==
- Alexander (Dilanas) - (1922-1924),
- Adamantius (Kasapidis) - (1943-1958),
- John (Zizioulas) - (1986-2023).

== Sources ==
- Kiminas, Demetrius (2009). The Ecumenical Patriarchate. Wildside Press LLC. ISBN 9781434458766.
- Terezakis, Yorgos (2005). "Diocese of Pergamon (Ottoman Period)". Εγκυκλοπαίδεια Μείζονος Ελληνισμού, Μ. Ασία.
