= Church of Saint Nicetas, Yaroslavl =

Russian Orthodox church in Yaroslavl

Coordinates: 57°37′26″N 39°52′08″E

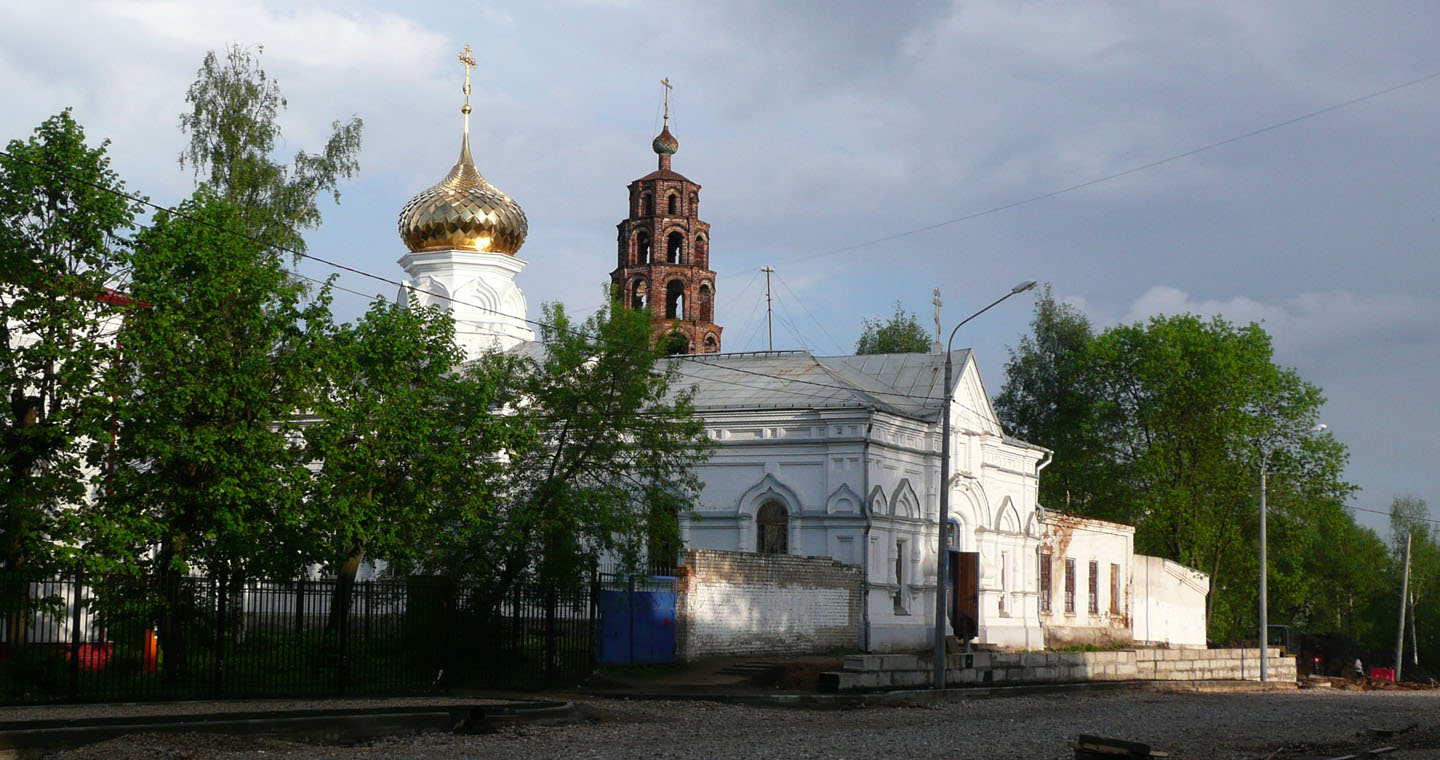
The parish in May 2010

The Church of St. Nicetas (церковь Никиты Столпника) is a Russian Orthodox church of St. Nicetas the Goth on Victory Street in Yaroslavl. It used to be the parish church of medieval Nikitskaya sloboda.

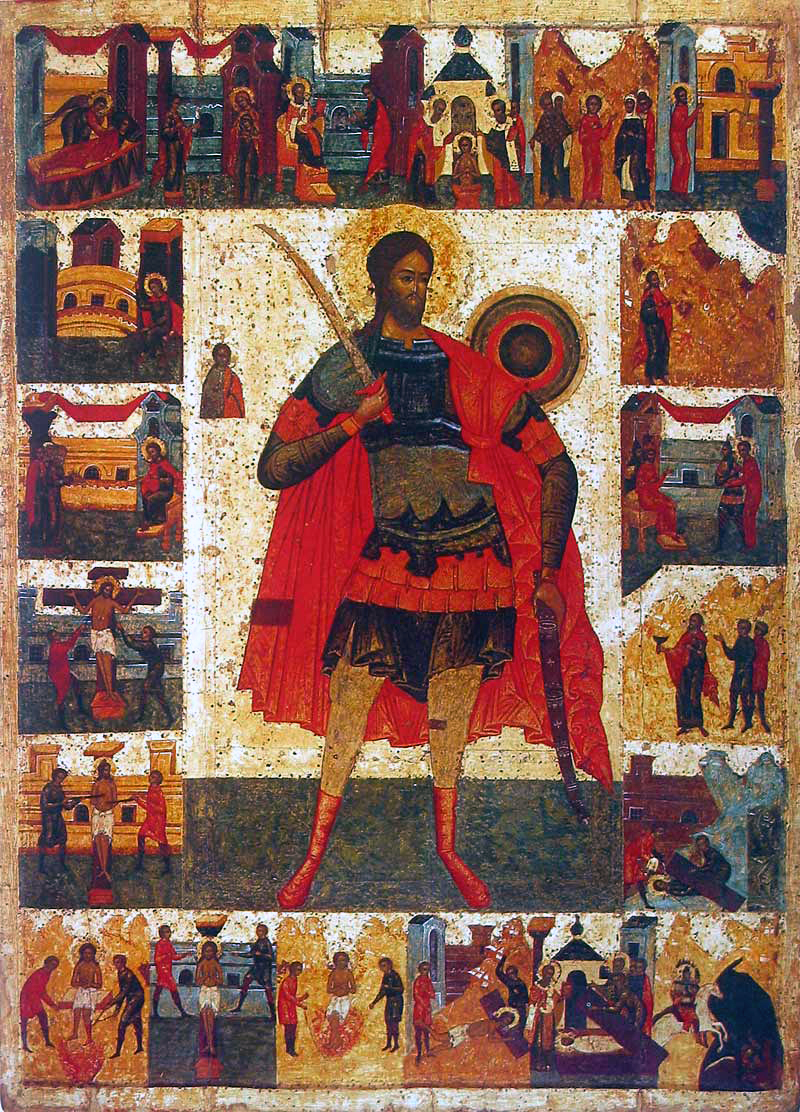
The church's main icon

The wooden church of St. Nicetas is known to have existed in 1511. It was rebuilt in stone in 1647 but remained one of the town's poorest churches through much of its history. Its main treasure was the large 16th-century icon of St. Nicetas, currently on exhibit in a local art gallery. After the Russian Revolution the church was closed and dismantled. Some of the frescoes were taken down to be sold abroad. Its remarkable bell tower, built at some point during Peter the Great's reign, still stands. The Soviets classed it as an object of top military importance because of its considerable height.

The parish of St. Nicetas also had a smaller church for winter services. It was consecrated to the Presentation of Jesus at the Temple in 1670. By the early 20th century, the building had proved too small for crowds of factory workers and was considerably expanded in a rather plain Russian Revival style. The domeless building was lucky to survive the Soviet period and has been renovated since 1997.
