= Saint Silouan's Bench =

Stone bench on Mount Athos, Greece

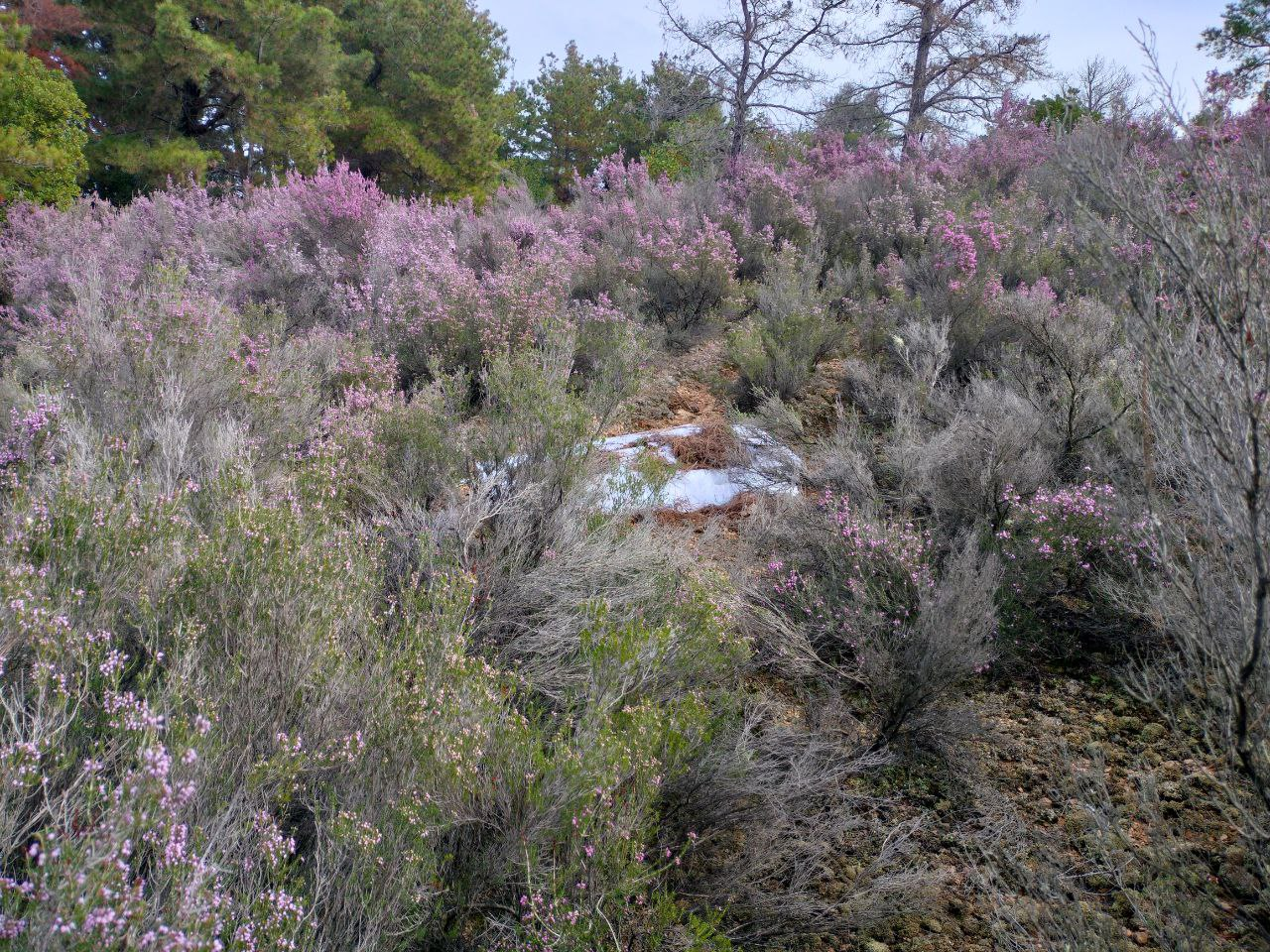
Saint Silouan's bench on Mount Athos in 2025

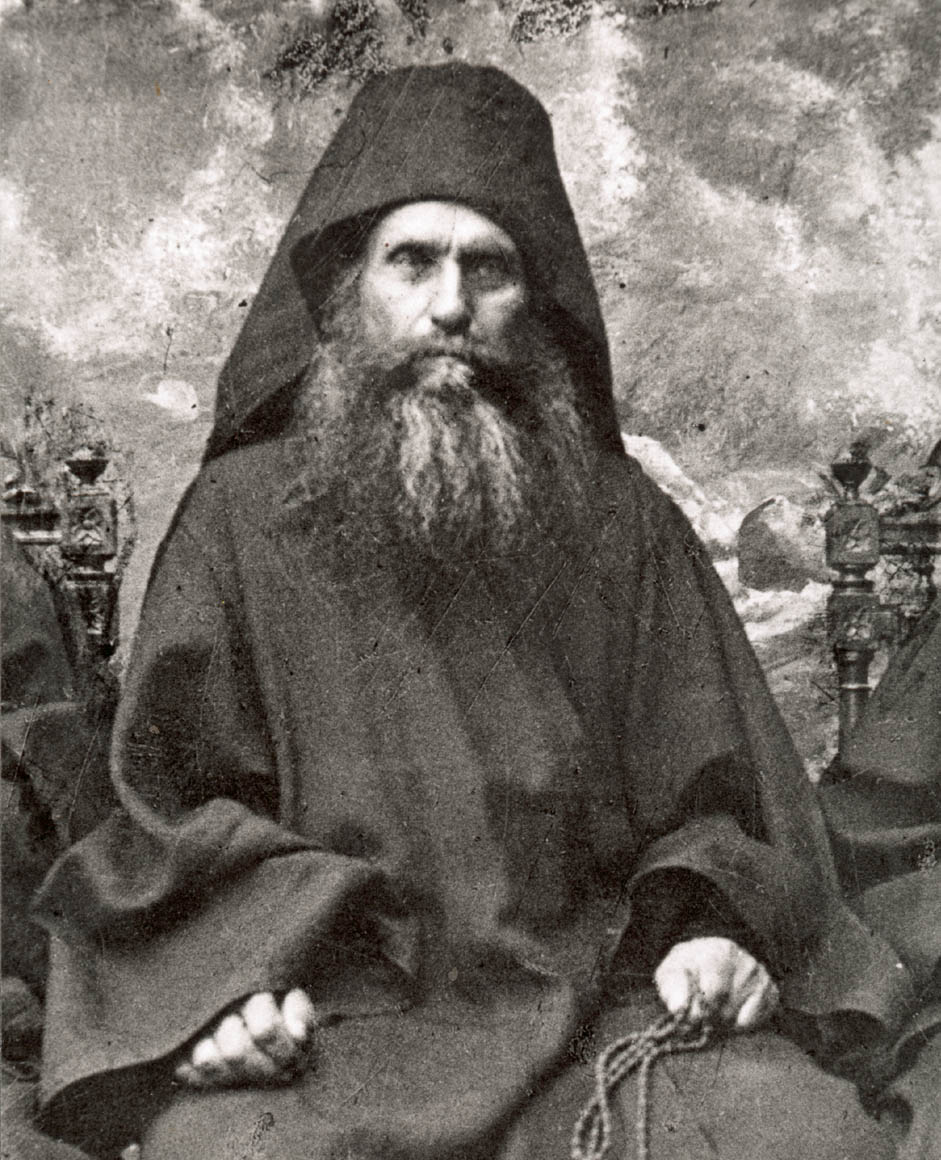
St. Silouan of Athos around 1930

Saint Silouan's Bench (russian: "Скамья Святого Силуана", greek: "Πάγκος Αγίου Σιλουανού") is an oblong stone partially dug into the ground near a trail on Mount Athos in north-eastern Greece.

== Origin of the name ==
According to archaeologists, pilgrims and locals, St. Silouan of Athos liked to seclude himself on this bench while praying. Because of this, the bench was nicknamed "St. Silouan's Bench".

== Location ==
It is located in Greece on the peninsula of Chalkidiki on the territory of the "Autonomous Monastic State of the Holy Mountain".

== History of the bench ==
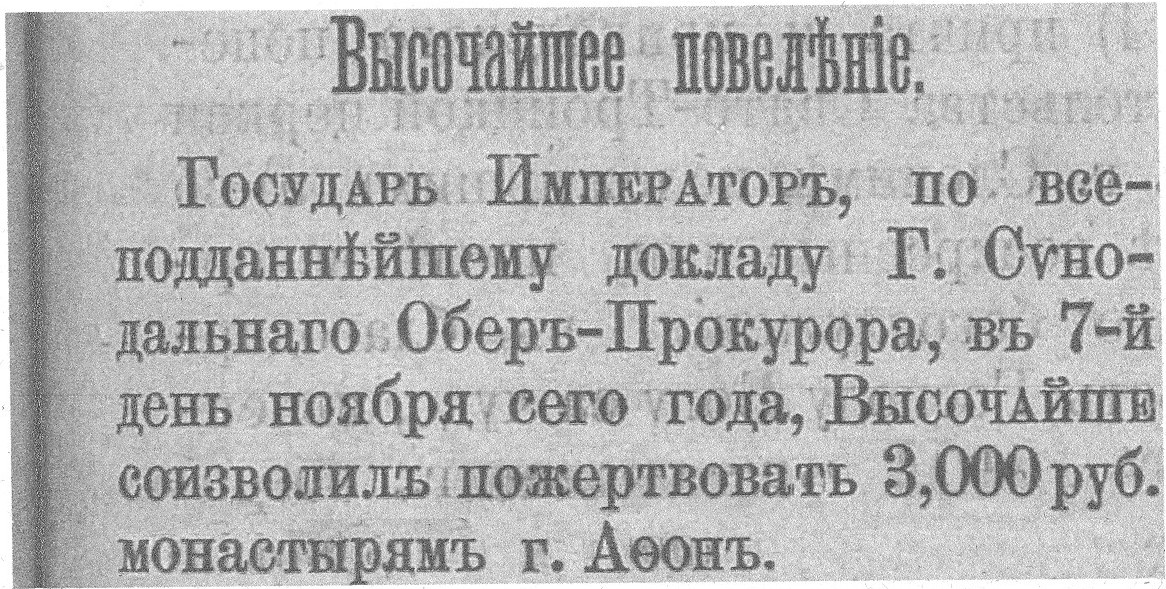
Caption about donation of 3000 rubles from Emperor Nicholas II

According to local reports, the bench appeared at the end of the 19th century. Emperor of the Russian Empire Nicholas II donated a large sum to the monasteries of Mount Athos (according to other information, the money came from private donations).

With the money received, the community purchased church utensils and building materials, which were delivered to the coastal pier. The building materials were transported by wagon higher up the mountain towards the sketes. One of the stones was poorly secured and fell off the wagon. This stone was decided to be transported later and left lying on the side of the road. For unknown reasons the construction stopped and the stone was forgotten. It remained lying by the mountain path, gradually growing into the ground. Later the monks used it as a bench on the way to the mountains for rest and prayer. Greek archaeologists identify the Bench of St. Silouan as one of the shrines of Mount Athos.

== Current condition ==
The bench still sits on the place where it fell off the wagon. The monks call it "the bench" or simply "the stone". Because of its convenient location on the way up the mountain, monks and pilgrims stop at the bench to pray and rest before continuing their journey to the top.
