= St. Panteleimon Monastery =

Eastern Orthodox monastery, Mount Athos

- Άγιος Παντελεήμων; Монастырь Святого Пантелеймона
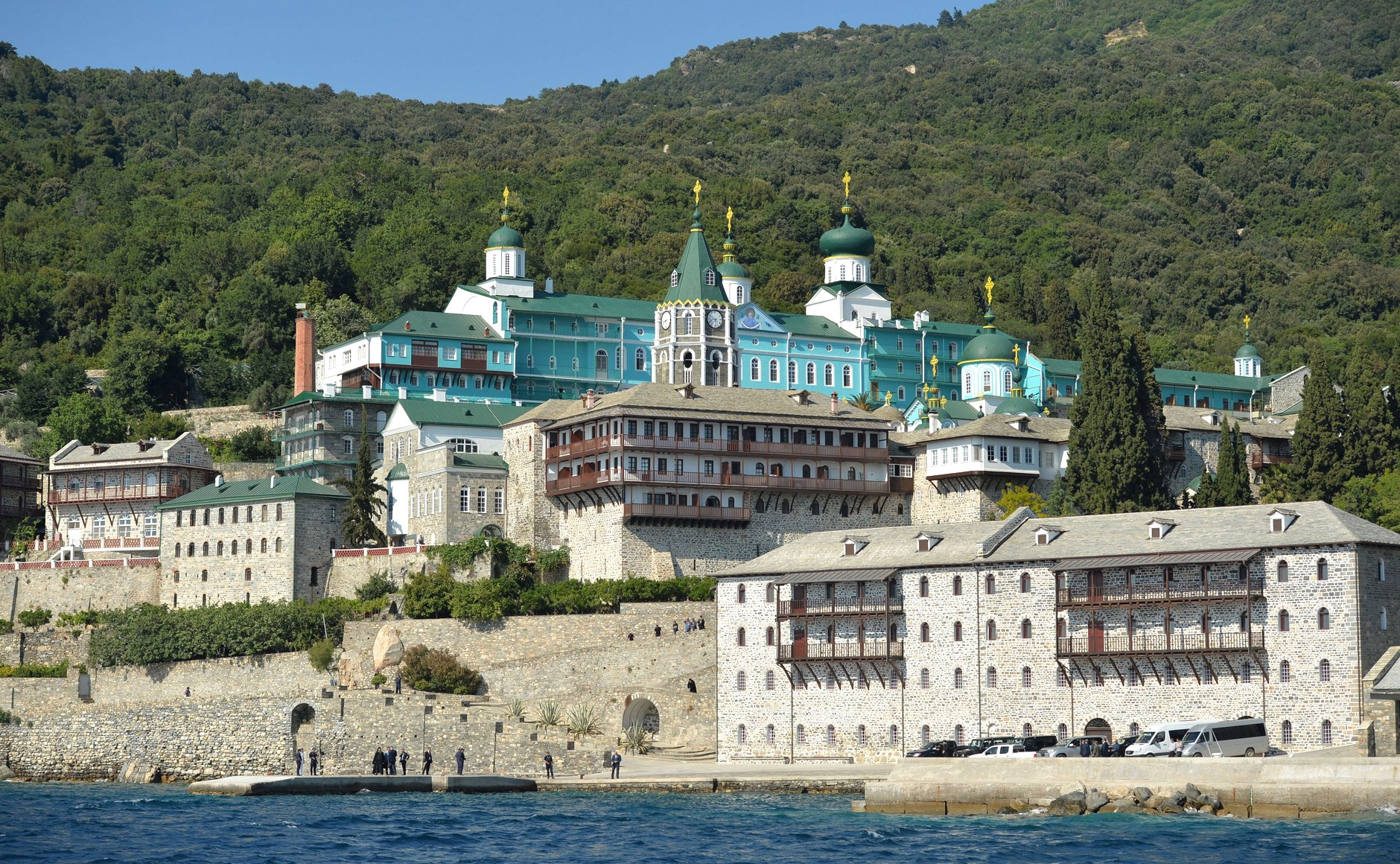

- Location on Mount Athos
- Interactive map of St. Panteleimon Monastery

Monastery information
- Full name: Holy Monastery of Agiou Panteleimonos
- Other name: Rossikon
- Order: Ecumenical Patriarchate of Constantinople
- Denomination: Russian Orthodox Church
- Established: 11th century
- Dedication: St. Panteleimon
- Diocese: Mount Athos

People
- Prior: Eulogius (Ivanov)

Architecture
- Status: Monastery
- Functional status: Active
- Style: Byzantine (Athonite)

Site
- Location: Mount Athos, North Aegean, Greece
- Coordinates: 40°14′13″N 24°12′07″E
- Public access: Men only
- Other information: Russian (language)

Saint Panteleimon Monastery (Greek: Μονή Αγίου Παντελεήμονος, romanized: Moní Agíou Panteleímonos, Russian: Монастырь Святого Пантелеймона), also known as Rossikon (Greek: Ρωσσικόν, romanized: Rossikón Russian: Россикон) or New Russik (Greek: Νέο Ρωσικό, romanized: Neo Rosiko, Russian: Новый Руссик, romanized: Novyy Russik), is one of the twenty Eastern Orthodox monasteries on Mount Athos, located on the southwestern side of the peninsula of the North Aegean region of Greece. It is the Russian monastery on the peninsula. It houses Russian and Ukrainian monks, sent by the Russian Orthodox Church, and the liturgies are delivered in Russian, despite the fact that all monks on Mount Athos become citizens of Greece.

== History ==
The monastery was founded by several monks from Kievan Rus' in the 11th century, which is why it is known as "Rossikon". It has been inhabited by mainly Russian monks in certain periods of its history. It was recognized as a separate monastery in 1169. The original monastery is known as Old Russik.

A Russian pilgrim, Isaiah, confirmed that by the end of the 15th century the monastery was Russian.

The monastery prospered in the 16th and 17th centuries being lavishly sponsored by the tsars of Russia and Serbian dukes of Kratovo, but it declined dramatically in the 18th century to the point where there were only two Russian and two Bulgarian monks left by 1730.

The construction of the present monastery on a new site, closer to the seashore, was carried out during the first two decades of the nineteenth century, with the financial help of the ruler of Moldo-Wallachia, Skarlatos Kallimachos. Russian monks numbered 1,000 in 1895, 1,446 in 1903, and more than 2,000 by 1913. During the Tatar yoke in Russia, most of the monks were Greeks and Serbs. The monastery occupies the nineteenth rank in the hierarchical order of the twenty Athonite monasteries. It is coenobitic (i.e., it is a communal monastic life). It also contains four sketes.

In 1913, the monastery was the site of a raging theological argument (Imiaslavie) among Russian monks, which led to tsarist Russian intervention and the deportation of approximately 800 of the monks on the losing side of the debate.

The Monastery of St Panteleimon was repeatedly gutted by fires, most famously in 1307, when Catalan mercenaries set it aflame, and in 1968. The first Russian leader to visit the monastery was President Vladimir Putin on September 9, 2005.

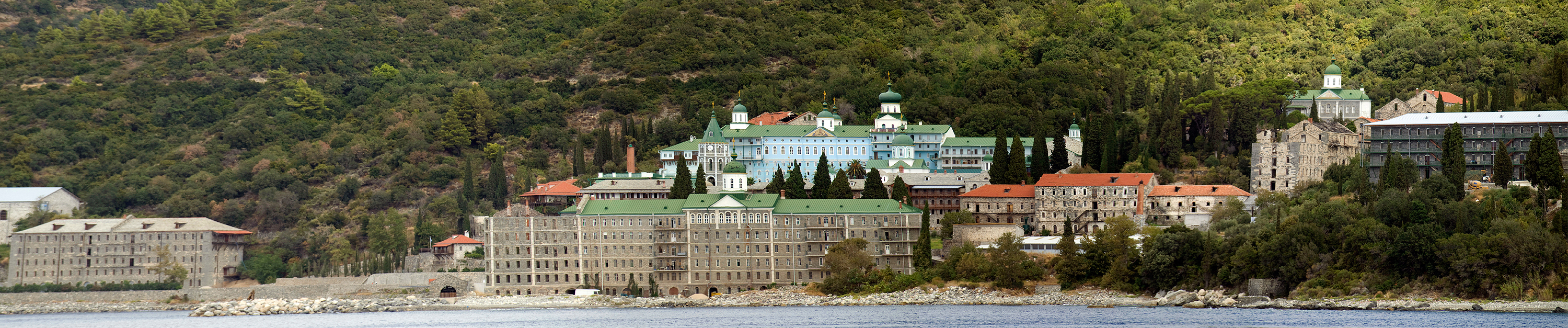

== In the modern era ==
Today, the monastery features the architecture of a small town, with buildings of various heights and many domes. It is the largest of the monasteries on the peninsula. Although destroyed by a fire in 1968, one wing of the monastery was used as the guest quarters, with a capacity of 1,000 monks. The monastery's katholikon (main church) was built between 1812 and 1821 and is dedicated to St. Panteleimon. It features the same style found in all the Athonite churches. Aside from the katholikon, the monastery has many smaller chapels.

The library is housed in a separate building in the monastery's court. It contains 1,320 Greek manuscripts and another 600 Slavonic ones, as well as 25,000 printed books. In addition, the library has a few priceless relics, such as the head of Saint Panteleimon, one of the most popular saints in Russia. The 19th-century monastery bells are said to be the largest in Greece. There is a daughter community at the monastery at New Athos, Abkhazia. Included in its collection are the Uncial 052 and Minuscule 1093 (Gregory-Aland).

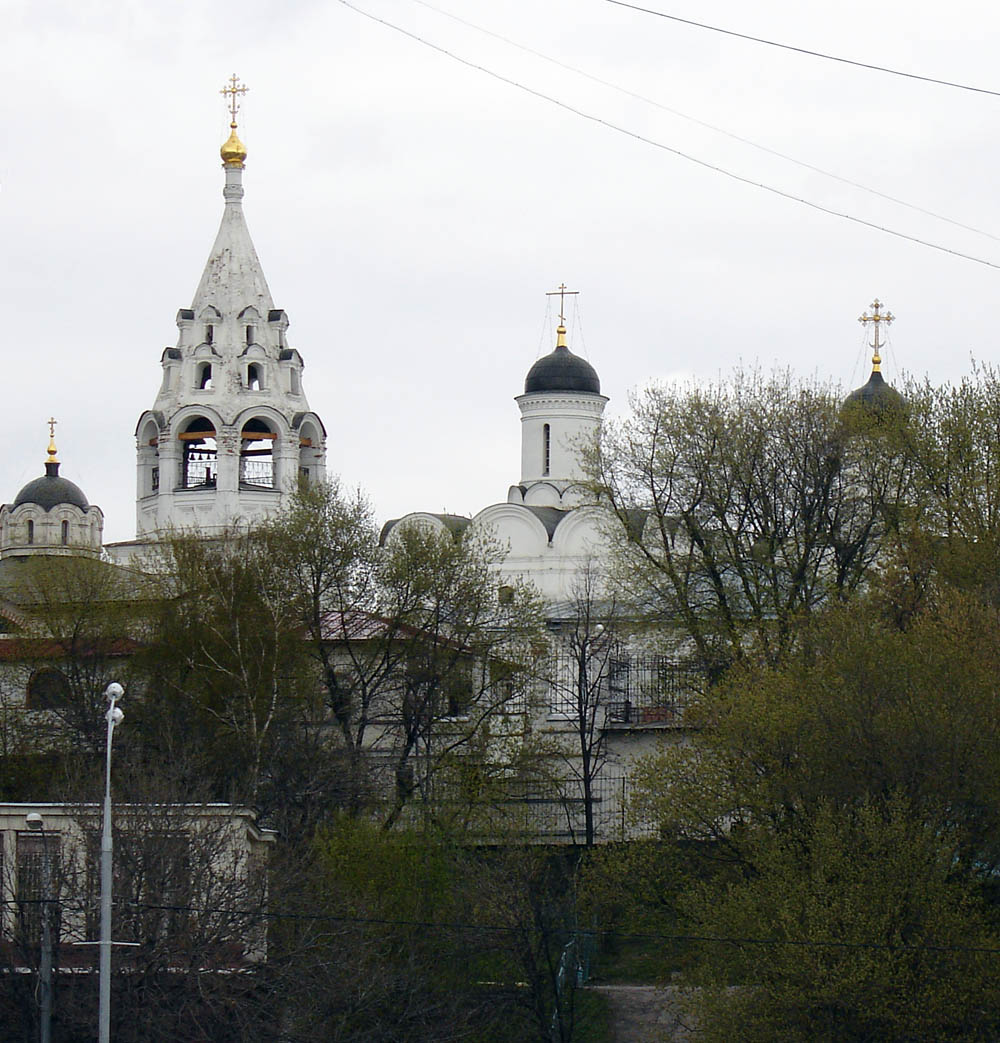
The Church of St. Nicetas in Moscow is a mission (metochion) of the Rossikon.

After the transfer of Athos to the Kingdom of Greece in 1912, and especially with the start of World War I in 1914, the stream of pilgrims and monks from Russia was disrupted and later was strictly controlled by the government of Greece until the collapse of the USSR in 1991. As a result, the number of Russian monks in the monastery and on Mount Athos generally was reduced from several thousand in the 1900s to 13 in the early 1970s. In the 1990s, Greece relaxed its restrictive policy and the monastery subsequently underwent a relative revival. As of May 2016, there were approximately 70 Russian and Ukrainian monks.

== Notable monks ==
- Daniel Katounakiotis
- Silouan the Athonite
- Archimandrite Sophrony

== See also ==
- Russian Orthodox Church
- List of monasteries in Greece
