= Sophrony (Sakharov) =

Russian monk, theologian, and writer (1896–1993)

Saint Sophrony the Athonite
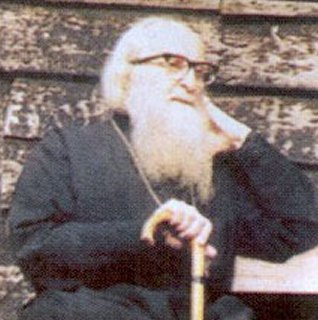
- Born: Sergiy Symeonovich Sakharov; 22 September 1896; Moscow, Russian Empire
- Died: 11 July 1993 (aged 96); Tolleshunt Knights, U.K.
- Venerated in: Eastern Orthodox Church
- Canonized: 27 November 2019 by Ecumenical Patriarchate of Constantinople

Sophrony the Athonite (born Sergiy Symeonovich Sakharov; 22 September 1896 – 11 July 1993), known also as Saint Sophrony, Elder Sophrony or Father Sophrony, was a Russian-born Orthodox Christian archimandrite and one of the most noted ascetic monks of the 20th century. He is best known as the disciple and biographer of Silouan the Athonite and compiler of his works in the classic book Saint Silouan the Athonite, and also as the founder of the Patriarchal Stavropegic Monastery of St. John the Baptist in Tolleshunt Knights, Maldon, Essex, England.

Towards the end of his life he published his spiritual autobiography in his book "We Shall See Him as He Is" where he relates in the most revealing way through his own experience, the mystical life of Christian Orthodox asceticism.

Sophrony was canonised by the Ecumenical Patriarchate of Constantinople on 27 November 2019.

== Timeline ==
=== Early life ===
On 22 September 1896, Sergiy Symeonovich Sakharov (Russian: Се́ргий Симео́нович Са́харов) was born to Orthodox parents in Russia. He grew up in a large Orthodox family with four brothers and four sisters. As a young child, he assimilated the spirit of prayer from his nanny, who would take him with her to church and he would pray for up to three quarters of an hour at a time. Even as a child, Sergiy claimed to have experienced the Uncreated Light, which he later described as the Christ-God manifesting as a light, which defies notions of place and volume. He read widely, including such Russian greats as Gogol, Turgenev, Tolstoy, Dostoyevsky and Pushkin.

Due to great artistic talent, Sakharov studied at the Academy of Arts between 1915 and 1917, and then at the Moscow School of Painting, Sculpture and Architecture between 1920 and 1921. He used art as a "quasi-mystical" means "to discover eternal beauty", "breaking through present reality ... into new horizons of being". Later, this would help him to differentiate between human intellectual light and God's Uncreated Light.

It was around the time of his study at the Moscow School that Sakharov would see Christianity's focus on personal love as being necessarily finite; he fell away from the Orthodoxy of his youth and delved into Indian mystical religions based on the impersonal Absolute.

In 1921 Sakharov left Russia: partly to continue his artistic career in Western Europe, and partly because he was not a Marxist. After first going to Italy, he went to Berlin, and then settled in Paris in 1922.

=== Paris ===
In 1922 Sakharov arrived in Paris where his artistic exhibitions attracted the attention of the French media. He was frustrated by the inability of art to express purity. He saw rational knowledge as unable to provide answer to the biggest question, the problem of death. In 1924 due to his realisation that Christ's precept to love God totally was not psychological but ontological, and the only way to relate to God, and the necessity of love being personal, Sakharov returned to Christianity on Great Saturday. He experienced Uncreated Light (in a strength unmatched to the end of his life) and as a result distanced himself from his art. The St. Sergius Orthodox Theological Institute began with Sakharov among its first students. Here he was lectured by Sergius Bulgakov and Nicholas Berdyaev; however, while both influenced him, problems with each (sophiology and anti-asceticism, respectively), meant that their influence on him was limited. In 1925, finding formal theological study to be unfulfilling, Sakharov left the institute and Paris for Mount Athos.

=== Mount Athos ===
As a young monk on Mount Athos

In 1926 Sakharov arrived at Mount Athos, entering the Monastery of St Panteleimon, desiring to learn how to pray and have the right attitude toward God. In 1930 he was ordained to the diaconate by Nicolai (Velimirovic) of Zicha. He became a disciple of Silouan the Athonite, Sophrony's greatest influence. While Silouan had no formal system of theology, his living of theology taught Sophrony volumes, which Sophrony would later systematise. From 1932 to 1946, Sophrony exchanged letters with David Balfour, a Catholic who converted to Orthodoxy. These letters reveal Sophrony's knowledge of many Church Fathers, and forced Sophrony to articulate his theological thought, and to demonstrate the differences between Western and Eastern thought. Many of Sophrony's later thoughts would arise out of the same topics addressed in this correspondence. One of Sophrony's critics was Georges Florovsky, who attacked his concept of "Theological Confession" through his critique of Lossky's understanding of antinomy as the criterion of piety. Sophrony was influenced by the latter in this specific theology.

Silouan died in 1938, on September 24. Following Silouan's instructions, Sophrony left the monastery grounds to reside in the Athonite desert: first at Karoulia, then at a cave near Agiou Pavlou Monastery. World War II was a time of such intense prayer that Sophrony's health was affected, teaching him the interdependence of all mankind. In 1941, Sophrony was ordained to the priesthood, and became a spiritual father to many Athonite monks.

=== Paris revisited ===
In 1947, circumstances (possibly to publish Silouan's works, possibly to complete his theological education, possibly due to deteriorating health, possibly due to difficulties of being non-Greek after WW2) forced Sophrony to move to Paris. Balfour helped him gain a passport. Here the faculty of St Sergius allowed Sophrony to sit the examinations of the whole course, providing for his needs; however, upon arrival, this was blocked by faculty insistence on Sophrony denying by silence the grace of the Moscow Patriarchate, which he refused to do. Sophrony settled in Russian House, an old-age home, in St Genevieve-des-Bois, assisting the priest and acting as father confessor. He had a major operation on a stomach ulcer.

In 1948, Sophrony produced the first mimeographed edition of Staretz Silouan on a hand-roneo. In it, Sophrony outlined Silouan's principles of theology, and explained many fundamental concepts (prayer for the whole world, God-forsakenness and the idea of all humanity being connected). In 1950 Sophrony worked with Vladimir Lossky on the Messager de l'Exarchat du Patriarche Russe en Europe Occidentale until 1957. Lossky influenced Sophrony's thoughts on many contemporary issues and complimented Sophrony's work on Trinitarian thought and its application to the church and humanity; however, Lossky would not talk about a deified human nature, nor about the idea of God-forsakenness in a positive view, as Sophrony did.

In 1952, Sophrony produced a professional second edition of Staretz Silouan. This book brought much fame to both Silouan and Sophrony, and included a theological introduction to Silouan's works, based on Lossky finding no theological value in Silouan's works.

=== Essex, England ===
By 1958 Sophrony had many people living near him who were seeking the monastic life. A property at Tolleshunt Knights, Maldon, Essex, England was inspected. In 1959 the Community of St John the Baptist was formed at Tolleshunt Knights under Metropolitan Anthony (Bloom) of Sourozh. The monastery has both monks and nuns, and numbers six. In 1965 the Monastery of St John the Baptist, with the blessing of Patriarch Alexy, moved under the Ecumenical Patriarchate's omophorion. Later, the Ecumenical Patriarchate would upgrade the Monastery to Stavropegic.

1973 saw the publication of a more complete translation of Monk of Mt Athos (the life of Silouan), while in 1975 Wisdom of Mt Athos (the writings of Silouan) was published. In 1977 His Life is Mine is published. We Shall See Him As He Is was published in 1985 to mixed reviews: readers in the West generally enjoyed the book, while the Russians generally criticised the book. Some criticism was so stinging that it, along with illness, discouraged Sophrony from writing again.

=== Events of and after his death ===
The monastery had been informed that the only way that it could bury people on its property was to build an underground crypt, which it proceeded to build; Sophrony said that he would not die until the crypt was ready. Then, having been told of the expected completion date of 12 July 1993, Sophrony stated that he "would be ready". On 11 July 1993, Sophrony died, and his funeral and burial, on the 14th, were attended by monastics from around the world. At the time of Fr Sophrony's death, there were 25 monastics in the monastery, a number that has grown since then.

Mother Elizabeth, the eldest nun, died soon after, on the 24th. This was in accordance with Sophrony's words: that he would die first, and she would die soon after.

On Prayer, a book containing Sophrony's writings on prayer - particularly the Jesus Prayer - was published posthumously. A comprehensive look at Sophrony's theology was later published by his great-nephew Nicholas Sakharov. This writer cited Sophrony's influence on a number of Russian thinkers, particularly his philosophy of "the knowing heart", which was contrasted to the "self-aware thinking mind in Hegel".

On 27 November 2019, the Ecumenical Patriarchate announced the glorification of Sophrony as a saint of the Orthodox Church.

== Books ==
- We Shall See Him As He Is, 1985. Essex, England: Stravropegic Monastery of St. John the Baptist, 1988.
- Saint Silouan, the Athonite, Stavropegic Monastery of St. John the Baptist; 1st edition, 1996 (ISBN 978-0-951-27868-0).
- On Prayer, Stavropegic Monastery of St. John the Baptist, 1998 (ISBN 1-874679-14-2).
- Striving for Knowledge of God: Correspondence with David Balfour, Stavropegic Monastery of St. John the Baptist, 1st edition, 2016 (ISBN 978-1-909649-06-4).
- Truth and Life, Stavropegic Monastery of St. John the Baptist, 1st edition, 2014 (ISBN 978-1-874679-96-7).
- Letters to His Family, Stavropegic Monastery of St. John the Baptist, 2nd edition, 2023 (ISBN 978-1-909649-01-9).
- Words of Life, Stavropegic Monastery of St. John the Baptist, 2nd edition, 2015 (ISBN 1-874679-16-9).
- Hearken, my Beloved Brethren, Stavropegic Monastery of St. John the Baptist, 2nd edition, 2021(ISBN 978-1-909649-57-6).
- The Mystery of Christian Life, Stavropegic Monastery of St. John the Baptist, 1st edition, 2022 (ISBN 978-1-909649-90-3).
- The Cross of Loneliness: The Correspondence of Saint Sophrony and Archpriest Georges Florovsky St. Tikhon's Monastery Press, 2021 (ISBN 978-1-7361723-1-5).
- The Undistorted Image: Staretz Silouan, 1866–1938, 1948, 1952. Faith Press, 1958.
- The Monk of Mount Athos: Staretz Silouan 1866–1938, Mowbray, 1973 (ISBN 0-264-64618-5). St. Vladimir's Seminary Press, 1997 (ISBN 0-913836-15-X).
- Wisdom from Mount Athos: The Writings of Staretz Siloan 1866–1938, St. Vladimir's Seminary Press, 1975 (ISBN 0-913836-17-6).
- His Life is Mine, St. Vladimir's Seminary Press, 1977. St. Vladimir's Seminary Press, 1997 (ISBN 0-913836-33-8).

=== Biographical ===
- Christ, Our Way and Our Life by Archimandrite Zacharias. "A Presentation of the theology of Archimandrite Sophrony." (ISBN 1-878997-74-2).
- I Love Therefore I Am by Nicholas V. Sakharov. St. Vladimir's Seminary Press, 2003 (ISBN 0-88141-236-8).
- I Know a Man in Christ: Elder Sophrony the Hesychast and Theologian by Hierotheos (Vlachos). Holy Monastery of the Birth of the Theotokos, 2015 (ISBN 960-7070-89-5).

== See also ==
- Theoria

== Online sources ==
- "Archimandrite Sophrony (Sakharov)". sophrony.narod.ru.
- "Hieromonk Gregory. Archimandrite Sophrony Falls Asleep In The Lord". sophrony.narod.ru.
- "Hieromonk Nicholas (Sakharov). The Theology of Archimandrite Sophrony. Chapter I." sophrony.narod.ru.
- "Elder Sophrony to be considered for canonization", OrthoChristian website, 28 October 2019
- "Saint Sophrony the Athonite: Short Biography". Community of St John the Baptist, Essex.
