= List of Greek films of the 1940s =

A list of notable films produced in Greece in the 1940s.

== 1940s ==
Title	Director	Cast	Genre	Notes
1940
To Tragoudi tou horismou (Το τραγούδι του χωρισμού)	Filopimin Finos	Labros Konstadaras, Alekos Livaditis	Drama	IMDb
1943
The Voice of the Heart (Η φωνή της καρδιάς)	Dimitris Ioannopoulos	Aimilios Veakis, Dimitris Horn, Alekos Livaditis	Romantic drama	IMDb
Mayia i tsigana (Μάγια η τσιγγάνα)	Yiannis Christodolou	Evgenia Danika, Rita Dimitriou, Dimos Starenios	Romantic drama	IMDb
1944
Hirokrotimata (Χειροκροτήματα)	Yorgos Javellas	Kleon Triantafyllou, Dimitris Horn	Biography	IMDb
1945
Ragismenes kardies (Ραγισμένες καρδιές)	Orestis Laskos	Stella Greka, Labros Konstadaras, Alekos Livaditis	Romantic drama	IMDb
I Villa me ta noufara (Η βίλα με τα νούφαρα)	Dimitris Ioannopoulos	Dimitris Myrat, Ketty Panou	Romantic drama	IMDb
1946
Papoutsi apo ton topo sou (Παπούτσι από τον τόπο σου)	Alekos Sakellarios	Manos Filippidis, Alekos Livaditis	Romance	IMDb
Prosopa lismonimena (Πρόσωπα λησμονημένα)	Yorgos Javellas	Giorgos Pappas, Miranda Myrat	Drama	IMDb
About the Thunders (Σιγά τους Κεραυνούς)	Pavlos Valasakis	Pavlos Valasakis	Comedy	IMDb
1947
I Kriti stis floges (Η Κρήτη στις φλόγες)	Antonis Papadantonakis	Nikos Efthimiou, Alekos Karavitis	War drama	IMDb
Marina (Μαρίνα)	Alekos Sakellarios	Stella Greka, Dimitris Myrat, Labros Konstadaras	Drama	IMDb
1948
The Germans Strike Again (Oi Germanoi xanarhodai, Οι Γερμανοί ξανάρχονται)	Alekos Sakellarios	Vasilis Logothetidis, Nitsa Tsaganea, Christos Tsaganeas, Lavrentis Dianellos, Mimis Fotopoulos	Comedy	Top IMDb ratings - IMDb
Hamenoi Ageloi (Χαμένοι άγγελοι)	Nikos Tsiforos	Mimis Fotopoulos, Irene Papas	Drama	IMDb
Marinos Kontaras (Μαρίνος Κονταράς)	Yorgos Javellas	Manos Katrakis	Drama	IMDb
Madam Sousou (Μαντάμ Σουσού)	Nikos Tsiforos	Marika Nezer, Vassilis Logothetidis, Mimis Fotopoulos, Christos Tsaganeas, Eleni Hajiargyri	Comedy	IMDb
1949
Dyo kosmoi (Δύο κόσμου)	Yannis Filippou, Iasson Novak	Inta Hristinaki, Alekos Alexandrakis	Drama	IMDb
Youth of Athens (Ta Paidia tis Athinas, Paidia tis Athinas)	Takis Bakopoulos	Ellie Lambeti, Yannis Apostolidis, Christoforos Nezer, Dionyssis Papayannopoulos	Drama	IMDb
