= List of highest-grossing Greek films =

The following are lists of highest-grossing Greek films screened at cinemas in Greece and globally. The commercial course of Greek cinema has changed over time. The more successful periods are the period of 1950s and 1960s, often called the golden age of Greek cinema, and the recent 2000s.

== Highest-grossing Greek films ==
Highest-grossing Greek films
Num	Movie	Year	Gross	Ref
1	Zorba the Greek	1964	$23,500,000	
2	Loafing and Camouflage: Sirens in the Aegean	2005	$11,680,950	
3	A Touch of Spice	2003	$10,395,779	
4	Safe Sex	1999	$10,000,000	
5	El Greco	2007	$9,620,040	
6	Nisos	2009	$5,696,912	
7	Eftyhia	2019	$5,200,000	
8	Worlds Apart	2015	$5,011,560	
9	Brides	2004	$5,000,509	
10	I-4: Loafing and Camouflage	2008	$4,641,951	

== Highest-grossing Greek films by year ==
Year	Title	Gross
2020	Halvai 5-0	$2,000,000
2019	Eftyhia	$5,200,000
2018	1968	$2,585,339
2017	The Bachelor 2	$1,954,469
2016	I Roza Tis Smirnis	$2,532,773
2015	Worlds Apart	$5,011,560
2014	Pempti & 12	$988,820
2013	Little England	$3,090,106
2012	What If...	$4,301,754
2011	Nisos 2: To kynigi tou hamenou thisavrou	$2,868,919
2010	I Love Karditsa	$4,100,754
2009	Nisos	$5,696,912
2008	I-4: Loafing and Camouflage	$4,641,951
2007	El Greco	$9,620,040
2006	Straight Story	$3,416,500
2005	Loafing and Camouflage: Sirens in the Aegean	$11,680,950
2004	Brides	$5,000,509
2003	A Touch of Spice	$10,395,779
2002	The Bubble	$350,000–$500,000
2001	Crying... Silicon Tears	$3,000,000–3,500,000
2000	Rizoto	$2,450,000

== Greek films with biggest number of admissions ==
The following table lists known estimated box office ticket sales for various high-grossing Greek films screened at cinemas in Greece.

Greek films with biggest number of admissions
Num	Movie	Year	Admissions
1.	A Touch of Spice	2003	1,300,000 (other reports put it at 1,600,000 or 1,560,000 or 1,277,902)
2.	Loafing and Camouflage: Sirens in the Aegean	2005	1,230,512 (others reports put it at 1,500,000 or 1,400,000 or 1,370,000)
3.	Safe Sex	1999	1,200,000 (other reports put it at 1,500,000 or 1,400,000)
4.	El Greco	2007	1.200.000 (others reports put it at 767,158)
5.	Ipolohagos Natassa	1970	751,117
6.	I Archontissa ki o Alitis	1968	750,380
7.	I-4: Loafing and Camouflage	2008	750.000
8.	I Daskala me ta Xanthia Mallia	1969	739,001
9.	Sta Synora tis Prodosias	1968	710,994
10.	Brides	2004	680,000 (other reports put it at 800,000 or 750,000 or 702,852)
11.	Worlds Apart	2015	668,892
12.	Something is Burning	1964	660,791
13.	My Daughter, the Socialist	1966	659,671
14.	Eftyhia	2019	655.439
15.	To Pio Lampro Asteri	1967	652,661
16.	Visibility Zero	1970	640,720
17.	What Did You Do in the War, Thanasi?	1971	640,471
18.	Oi gennaioi tou Vorra	1970	626.720
19.	I neraida kai to palikari	1969	626.676
20.	Kiss the Girls	1965	619.236

== Greek films with biggest number of admissions by year ==
Year	Title	Admissions
2020	Halvai 5-0	213.466
2019	Eftyhia	655.439
2018	1968	220.727
2017	The Bachelor 2	237.559
2016	I Roza Tis Smirnis	356.983
2015	Worlds Apart	668.892
2014	Pempti & 12	124.559
2013	Little England	361.441
2012	What If...	531.547
2011	Nisos 2: To kynigi tou hamenou thisavrou	299.296
2010	I Love Karditsa	353.981
2009	Nisos	545.772
2008	I-4: Loafing and Camouflage	750.000
2007	El Greco	1.200.000 (others reports put it at 767,158)
2006	Straight Story	300.000
2005	Loafing and Camouflage: Sirens in the Aegean	1,230,512 (others reports put it at 1,500,000 or 1,400,000 or 1,370,000)
2004	Brides	680,000 (other reports put it at 800,000 or 750,000 or 702,852)
2003	A Touch of Spice	1,300,000 (other reports put it at 1,600,000 or 1,560,000 or 1,277,902)
2002	The Bubble	38.000
2001	Crying... Silicon Tears	440.000
2000	Rizoto	270.000
1999	Safe Sex (film)	1,200,000 (other reports put it at 1,500,000 or 1,400,000)
1998	Prostatis Oikogeneias	222,000
1997	Valkanizater	290,000
1996	O Orgasmos tis Ageladas	200,000
1995	To vlemma tou Odyssea	190,000
1994	Telos Epohis	230,000
1993	Lefteris Dimakopoulos	120,000
1980	The Man with the Carnation	618,533
1974	Pavlos Melas	432,989
1973	I Maria tis Siopis	202,403
1972	Me Fovon kai Pathos	372.819
1971	What Did You Do in the War, Thanasi?	640,471
1970	Ipolohagos Natassa	751,117
1969	I Daskala me ta Xanthia Mallia	739,001
1968	I Archontissa ki o Alitis	750,380
1967	To Pio Lampro Asteri	652,661
1966	My Daughter, the Socialist	659,671
1965	Kiss the Girls	619.236
1964	Something is Burning	660,791
1963	Htypokardia sto Thranio	591,675
1962	Orgi	132,102
1961	I Aliki sto Naftiko	213,409
1960	To Klotsoskoufi	202,542
1959	To Xylo Vgike apo ton Paradeiso	239,530
1958	O Mimikos kai i Mary	130,209
1957	I Theia apo to Chicago	142,459
1956	I Kafetzou	137,267
1955	Istoria mias Kalpikis Liras	208,410
1954	Haroumeno xekinima	124,749
1953	The Taxi Driver	190,589
1952	Ena Votsalo sti Limni	151,058
1951	Ta Tessera Skalopatia	194,493
1950	O Μethystakas	304,438
1949	O Kokkinos Vrahos	78,477
1948	Hamenoi Angeloi	107,508
1947	Marina	68,000
1946	Prosopa Lismonimena	65,000
1945	I Villa me ta Noufara	70,300

== See also ==
- Cinema of Greece
