= The Wastrel =

1961 film

- Film poster
- Directed by: Michael Cacoyannis
- Written by: Suso Cecchi d'Amico; Michael Cacoyannis; Frederic Wakeman, Sr.
- Produced by: Angelo Ferrara
- Starring: Ellie Lambeti
- Cinematography: Piero Portalupi
- Edited by: Alberto Gallitti
- Music by: Angelo Francesco Lavagnino
- Release date: 1961
- Running time: 84 minutes
- Countries: Italy; Cyprus
- Language: English

The Wastrel (Italian: Il relitto) is a 1961 Italian-Cypriot drama film directed by Michael Cacoyannis and starring Ellie Lambeti. It was entered into the 1961 Cannes Film Festival.

== Cast ==
- Ellie Lambeti as Mrs. Bell
- Van Heflin as Duncan Bell
- Franco Fabrizi as Rudi Veronese
- Fosco Giachetti as Captain Hugh Hardy
- Annie Gorassini as Monique
- Clelia Matania as Betsy
- Renata Mauro as Moglie del governatore
- Tiberio Mitri as Macniff
- Paul Muller
- Rosalba Neri as La ragazza nel night club

== See also ==
- List of Cypriot films
- Attilas '74
- Akamas
