= Konstantaras =

Konstantaras is a surname. Notable people with the surname include:

- Dimitris Konstantaras (1946–2025), Greek politician
- Lambros Konstantaras (1913–1985), Greek actor
