= I4 =

I-4 often refers to Interstate 4, an interstate highway in central Florida.

I-4, I4, i4 or I 4 may also refer to:

== Arts, entertainment, and media ==
- I-4: Loafing and Camouflage, a Greek film

== Military ==
- 1st Life Grenadier Regiment (Sweden) (1816–1927), a Swedish infantry regiment
- Japanese submarine I-4, a World War II Type J1 submarine of the Imperial Japanese Navy
- Life Grenadier Regiment (Sweden) (1928–1997), a Swedish infantry regiment
- Tupolev I-4, a 1927 Soviet aircraft

== Science and technology ==
- I-4 satellite
- i4, an integer in XML-RPC
- Industrie 4.0, the fourth Industrial Revolution
- I4, three-dimensional space group number 79
- I4̅, three-dimensional space group number 82

== Transportation ==
- I4 engine, a piston engine
- BMW i4, a German mid-size electric sedan
- Interstate Airlines, by IATA airline designator
- LB&SCR I4 class, a British locomotive
- I-4 road (Bulgaria), a major road in Northern Bulgaria

== See also ==
- iPhone 4, a smartphone
- 4I (disambiguation)
