= Our Last Spring =

1960 film

- Directed by: Michael Cacoyannis
- Written by: Michael Cacoyannis; Jane Cobb; Kosmas Politis (novel)
- Produced by: Michael Cacoyannis
- Starring: Alexandros Mamatis
- Cinematography: Walter Lassally
- Release date: June 1960
- Running time: 120 minutes
- Country: Greece
- Language: Greek

Our Last Spring (Greek: Ερόικα, translit. Eroica) is a 1960 Greek drama film directed by Michael Cacoyannis and based on the 1938 novel "Eroica" by Greek writer Kosmas Politis. It was entered into the 10th Berlin International Film Festival.

== Cast ==
- Alexandros Mamatis as Alekos
- Jenny Russell as Monika
- Nikiforos Naneris as Dimitris
- Panos Goumas as Loizos
- Patrick O'Brian as Sebastian
- Marie Ney as Norton
- Tasso Kavadia
- Lydia Vasileiadou
- Jane Cobb
- Robin Fife
- Nikos Ignatiadis
- Giannis Voglis
- Nikos Pilavios as Nestor
- Phaedon Georgitsis
- Michalis Nikolinakos
- Paris Pappis
- Nana Gatsi
