= The Duchess of Plakendia =

- Directed by: Maria Plyta
- Written by: Maria Plyta
- Cinematography: Prodromos Meravidis
- Music by: Giorgos Kazasoglou
- Production company: Panellinios Film Company
- Release date: January 30, 1956
- Running time: 94 minutes
- Country: Greece
- Language: Greek

The Duchess of Plakendia (Greek: I doukissa tis Plakentias) is a 1956 Greek historical drama film directed by Maria Plyta and starring Rita Myrat, Voula Harilaou and Alekos Deligiannis.

== Cast ==
- Rita Myrat as Sofia
- Voula Harilaou as Sofia's Daughter
- Alekos Deligiannis
- Thodoros Moridis
- Labros Konstadaras
- Mihalis Bouhlis
- Dimitris Nikolaidis
- Hristos Apostolou
- Kostas Baladimas
- Stavros Christofides
- Despo Diamantidou
- Tasos Gouvas
- Mihalis Iakovidis
- Mirka Kalatzopoulou
- Giannis Kandilas
- Labros Kotsiris
- Dimitris Koukis
- Elli Koutouvali
- Kostis Leivadeas
- Vassilis Mavromatis
- Spyros Olybios
- Alkis Papas
- Eftyhia Pavlogianni
- Yorgos Ploutis
- Dionysia Roi
- Giorgos Rois
- Mimis Rougeris
- Lelos Savvopoulos
- Mimis Savvopoulos
- Andreas Stagias
- Tzeni Tsakiri

== Bibliography ==
- Vrasidas Karalis. A History of Greek Cinema. A&C Black, 2012.
