= Zozo =

Zozo may refer to:

== Arts and entertainment ==
- Zozo (film), a 2005 Swedish-Lebanese drama film
- Zozo, the British name of the fictional character Curious George
- Zozo, a fictional town in the video game Final Fantasy VI
- Lady Zozo, a fictional character in the video game Code of Princess
- The Zozo Sisters, an American musical project formed by Linda Ronstadt and Ann Savoy, who recorded and released the album Adieu False Heart

== Other uses ==
- Zozo Zarpa (1939–2012), Greek actress
- Zozo, the nickname of the town of Carrizozo, New Mexico
- ZOZO, a Japanese clothing brand owned by Yusaku Maezawa
  - Zozo Championship, a golf tournament in Inzai, Chiba, Japan, sponsored by the Japanese clothing brand
  - Zozo Marine Stadium, a baseball and rugby union stadium in Chiba, Chiba, Japan, named after the Japanese clothing brand

== See also ==
- I Am Zozo, a 2012 American horror thriller film
- Led Zeppelin IV, also known as ZoSo, a 1971 album by Led Zeppelin
