= National Theatre of Greece Drama School =

Public drama school in Greece

- Ανωτέρα Σχολή Δραματικής Τέχνης Εθνικού Θεάτρου
- Type: Public
- Established: 1930
- Location: Neo Faliro-Piraeus, Athens, Greece
- Website: n-t.gr/dramaschool

The National Theatre of Greece Drama School (GNT Drama School) was founded in 1930, since when it has operated in tandem with the National Theatre of Greece. In its history a number of its graduates have gone on to become major actors and stars of the National Theatre.

Former students of the Drama School include Dimitris Horn, Mary Aroni, Vasso Manolidou, Nikos Tzogias, Melina Mercouri, Thanos Kotsopoulos, Alexis Solomos, Stelios Vokovic, Nikos Kourkoulos, Anna Synodinou and Zozo Zarpa. Many of them went on to teach at the School, which has always been renowned for the extremely high level of its teaching. Other great names that have taught at the school include Dimitris Rondiris, Katina Paxinou, Takis Mouzenidis, Angelos Terzakis, Antigone Valakou, Tassos Lignadis, Giannis Sideris, Emilios Hourmouzios and others.

Since 8 February 2023 it has stopped functioning due to the mass resignation of the faculty, as a result of 85/2022 Presidential Decree, according to which all graduates are considered equivalent to holders of High School degrees.

== Studies ==
The purpose of the Drama School is to train and provide guidance to young people intending to enter the acting profession. The course lasts three years and is free of charge. Its classes come into three categories:

- Acting is taught by professional actors and directors. It has three teachers a year.
- Theory Dramatology, History of Theatre, Modern Greek Literature and History of Cinema are taught by experts in each subject
- Technical Dance and Gymnastics, Dance and Expressive Movement, Greek Dancing, Stage Combat, Musical Speech Training, Theatrical Song and Set, Costume and Make-Up Design are taught in each of the three years.

== Studies ==
The school is located in Pireos 52, 185 47, Neo Faliro - Piraeus, in southern Athens in the recently renovated building of "Scholion tis Athinas - Irini Papa".
