= Eva (1953 film) =

1953 film by Maria Plyta

- Directed by: Maria Plyta
- Written by: Andreas Labrinos
- Cinematography: Louis Hepp; Prodromos Meravidis
- Edited by: Maria Plyta
- Music by: Mikis Theodorakis
- Production company: Kominis Film
- Release date: 13 April 1953
- Running time: 83 minutes
- Country: Greece
- Language: Greek

Eva or Eve is a 1953 Greek drama film directed by Maria Plyta and starring Manos Katrakis, Dinos Iliopoulos and Nina Sgouridou.

Maria Plyta honoured at 78th Cannes Film Festival - Classics with the restored screening of Eva, the first Greek film ever selected for the section.

== Cast ==
- Manos Katrakis as Alekos
- Dinos Iliopoulos as Nasos
- Nina Sgouridou as Eva
- Aliki Georgouli as Anny
- Alekos Alexandrakis as Antinoos
- Fragoulis Fragoulis
- Ilias Iakovou
- Alekos Leventis
- Takis Mihalopoulos
- Eleni Panagiotopoulou
- Thanos Papadopoulos
- Dionysia Roi
- Smaro Veaki
- Nana Viopoulou
- Dimitris Vlahopoulos

== Bibliography ==
- Karalis, Vrasidas (2012). A History of Greek Cinema (1st ed.). New York City: Bloomsbury Publishing. ISBN 978-1441194473.
