= Tasos Leivaditis =

Greek poet and writer (1922–1988)

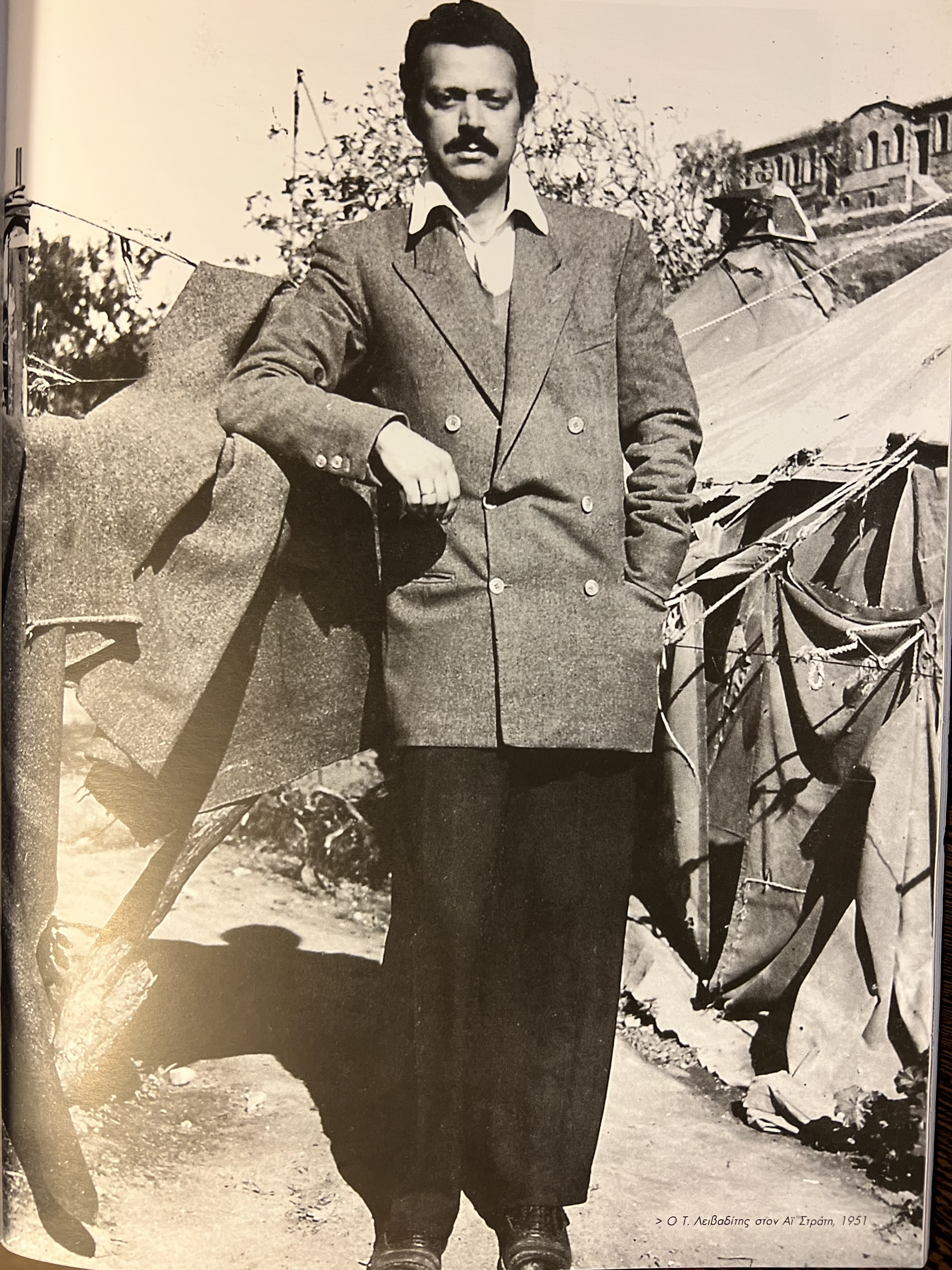
- Leivaditis on Ai-Stratis in 1951
- Born: 20 April 1922; Athens, Greece
- Died: 30 October 1988 (aged 66); Athens, Greece
- Occupations: Poet, literary critic
- Writing career
- Notable awards: National Poetry Prize, 1979 (for "Euthanasia Manual")
- Literary movement: Post-WWII leftist literature; "poetry of defeat"

Tasos Leivaditis (Greek: Τάσος Λειβαδίτης; 20 April 1922 – 30 October 1988) was a Greek poet, short story writer and literary critic. He belonged to the postwar generation that was deeply marked by the struggles and failures of the communist movement. His early and politically committed poetry travelled through the ‘fire and sword’ of history, transforming in the end into powerful and paradoxical prose-poems, and displaying an erotically charged form of ‘neo-romanticism’ mixed with ‘melancholic minimalism’ where “genuine humility offers obeisance to the magic of language.”

== Early life ==
Leivaditis was born in Athens, Greece, on 20 April 1922. As this happened to be the eve of Easter Saturday, he was given the name of 'Tasos' short for 'Anastasios' (Αναστάσιος), derived from the Greek word for 'resurrection' (ανάσταση). He grew up in Metaxourgeio, a working-class neighborhood at the time, located northwest of the historical centre of Athens. His father, Lysandros, moved from Kontovazaina (a village in mountainous Arcadia, in the Peloponnese) to Athens, where he set up a prosperous textiles store. Tasos had four older siblings: a sister (Chrysaphenia), two brothers (the eldest Alexandros, and Dimitris), and a half-brother (Konstantinos) from his mother's previous marriage. The elder brother Alexandros or Alekos (1914–1980) was to become a successful actor in theatre and film, while his brother Dimitris worked as a musician for the Greek National Opera. (Contrary to popular opinion, the acclaimed television actor, Thanos Leivaditis (1934–2005), was not related to Tasos Leivaditis.)

Tasos' childhood has been described by those who grew up with him as happy and carefree, and according to his own testimony he began writing poetry at 12 or 13 years of age, even earning the nicknames 'Byron' and 'Leopardi' at school. It was during this time, while still at school, that he also began to take a serious interest in communism.

== Resistance during the Occupation ==
Leivaditis enrolled in the Law School of the University of Athens in 1940, and soon after (in October of that year) Greece entered World War II. By April the following year German troops had overrun Athens. Leivaditis eventually abandoned his studies and joined the leftist resistance movement known as EAM (Εθνικό Απελευθερωτικό Μέτωπο, National Liberation Front), becoming a member of the youth wing of the movement, known as EPON (Ενιαία Πανελλαδική Οργάνωση Νέων, United Panhellenic Organization of Youth), soon after its formation in February 1943.

== Exile and imprisonment ==
The internal conflict between EAM and right-wing forces that had begun during the Occupation erupted again soon after the Germans withdrew from Greece. Fierce fighting broke out in Athens, in December 1944 (which has therefore become known as the Dekemvriana), and for his part in the battle Leivaditis was arrested and imprisoned; he was released after the Varkiza Agreement of February 12, 1945.

The following year, 1946, Leivaditis married Maria Stoupas, and they were to have one daughter, Vasiliki (or Vaso). Also in 1946, Leivaditis made his literary debut, publishing the poem “Το τραγούδι του Χατζηδημήτρη (απόσπασμα)” (‘The Song of Hadjidimitri (excerpt)’) in the November issue of the periodical Elefthera Grammata; and in the December issue of the same periodical he published the Dekemvriana-inspired poem “Απ’ το Δεκέμβρη” (‘From December’).

In 1947, Leivaditis, along with a group of other leftist youths (including Alexandros Argyriou, Titos Patrikios, and Mihalis Katsaros), helped put together the short-lived literary journal, Θεμέλιο (themelio, foundation). In the second, and last, issue of the journal, published in September 1947, Leivaditis contributed a translation of Loys Masson’s “Épitaphe” (rendered as “Επιτάφιος”, Funeral Hymn). In the same year, Leivaditis also published the poem “Η κυρά της Όστριας” (‘The Lady of Ostro’) in Greece’s longest-running literary journal, Νέα Εστία (Nea Hestia).

As the civil war in Greece escalated and the persecution of communists intensified, Leivaditis was arrested in June 1948 and, without trial, sent into internal exile. He was to spend close to three years on various prison camps spread across the Aegean. Initially he was sent to Moudros, a town on the island of Lemnos. After a year, in the summer of 1949, he was transferred to the dreaded island of Makronisos, off the Attica coast (his fellow poet and lifelong friend, Yannis Ritsos, also arrived at Makronisos at this time). Despite the appalling living conditions and the brutality and violence he witnessed and experienced, Leivaditis refused to denounce his communist beliefs and sign a ‘repentance declaration’ (δήλωση μετάνοιας). He would also continue writing, in secret, as did many others interned in Makronisos, including Ritsos, Alexandrou, Patrikios and Theodorakis, who “wrote poems there. Often they committed these to memory, but occasionally they scrawled them on paper, which was almost impossible to find, and hid them in bottles or in crevices, trying to save them from the raids of the Military Police.” In the summer of 1950, Leivaditis was transferred again, this time to Ai-Stratis (Agios Efstratios), a small island in the northern Aegean Sea. In late 1951 he was moved to the Chatzikosta Prison in Athens, and by the end of the year he was finally free, albeit as an ‘αδειούχος εξόριστος’: a detainee who has been granted leave to return to the community, but who remains under constant surveillance.

== Triptych and trial ==
In 1954 Leivaditis began working for the weekly newspaper, Η Αυγή (‘The Dawn’), which had begun circulation in 1952 as the mouthpiece of the broadly leftist political party, Ενιαία Δημοκρατική Αριστερά (ΕΔΑ), the United Democratic Left (EDA). Leivaditis was to work as the newspaper’s literary critic, reviewing newly published poetry books, a role he occupied for the remainder of his life (except for the period of the 1967-74 junta, when the paper was shut down).

While working at the newspaper, Leivaditis was also involved in setting up the literary journal, Επιθεώρηση Τέχνης (‘Cultural Review’), which has been described as “possibly the most significant leftist literary periodical of the time,” and which was issued monthly from January 1955, with each issue averaging around 100 pages. Although initially closely involved with the journal, Leivaditis was to drift away from the editorial committee from early 1957, though he continued to contribute to the journal until it was closed down in 1967 when the junta came to power.

After returning from enforced exile Leivaditis published his first poetry books in fairly quick succession: Μάχη στην άκρη της νύχτας (‘Battle at the Edge of the Night’, 1952), Αυτό το αστέρι είναι για όλους μας (‘This Star Is For All Of Us’, 1952), and Φυσάει στα σταυροδρόμια του κόσμου (‘The Wind at the Crossroads of the World’, 1953). This triptych, which was begun on Makronisos, gives expression to the terrors and horrors of the prison camps and the abject conditions of the civil war years, which incite the exploited and destitute masses to come together to fight for a new, more equal and just, society. However, the last of these three works, The Wind at the Crossroads of the World, was to land Leivaditis in trouble again with the authorities, who banned the book because of its “seditious” content and soon after put Leivaditis on trial. On February 10, 1955, before a packed courtroom, Leivaditis gave a spirited defence of his work and was acquitted. Leivaditis was further vindicated that summer when The Wind was awarded first prize in the poetry competition of the World Festival of Youth and Students, hosted in Warsaw, Poland.

== The 'poetry of defeat' ==
After a promising start with his first poetry volumes, Leivaditis was to make an important turn which would continue and deepen for the remainder of his career. His turning-point came, as it did for many leftist intellectuals of the time, in 1956, a year in which faith in the communist cause was severely tested by Khrushchev’s secret denunciation of Stalin at the 20th Congress of the Communist Party of the Soviet Union, and by the anti-Soviet uprisings in Poland and Hungary and their brutal suppression. These events profoundly affected Leivaditis, causing him to rethink his allegiance to communism. With the Left in Greece defeated in the civil war, and with hopes in Soviet communism dashed, Leivaditis’ poetry begins to move in a different direction, one that is increasingly melancholic, resigned, solitary and skeptical. Many other poets of Leivaditis’ generation were also making a similar turn, giving rise to the ‘poetry of defeat’ movement.

The term itself, ‘poetry of defeat’, was coined by the poet and critic Byron Leondaris (1932–2014) in his influential 1963 article, “Poetry of Defeat”, published in Epitheorisi Technis. Leondaris perceived a new political climate arising in the late 50s and early 60s, whose nucleus, he argued, is “the feeling that man today emerges utterly damaged after suffering a defeat which not only indelibly marks the Greek world, but is, more generally, the defeat of humankind, of civilisation.” Leondaris identifies this new sensibility in a number of writers, and even though he concentrates on Thanasis Kostavaras’ Ο Γυρισμός (‘The Return’, 1963) and Titos Patrikios’ Μαθητεία (‘Exercises’, 1963), he also finds a similar shift taking place in Leivaditis’ work – and in particular from The Wind at the Crossroads of the World (1953) to Symphony #1 (1957). For Leondaris, this new poetry has its origins in the crisis in, if not the end of, the ideology of (leftist) resistance. Leondaris notes: “Not infrequently the phenomenon can be observed that many poets are won over to poetry the very moment their ideology begins to give way.” Another commentator, Dimitris Raftopoulos, has described this as “the most provocative statement” in Leondaris’ article, and immediately after making this statement Leondaris goes on to cite Leivaditis’ Symphony #1 as a case in point. Importantly, Leondaris makes the qualification that he is not claiming that Leivaditis achieved a greater poetic effect with Symphony #1 than in his previous works by giving up his former political commitments; rather, the later work remains politically engaged, though now “its poetic quality arises from a generative psychic turmoil, from the tribulations of a conscience in crisis.”

Leondaris’ article aroused much debate, and Leivaditis’ reflections on the topic were published in the September 1966 issue of Epitheoresi Technis as “Η Ποίηση της Ήττας: Ένα θέμα για διερεύνηση” (“The Poetry of Defeat: An Investigation”). Leivaditis makes two claims in this article. First, the defeat suffered by the Left was not political, military, or ideological in nature, but was rather a moral defeat (having to do with failures within the movement, such as its despotism and nepotism) and, above all, a defeat of a personal and psychological kind, where “fear, cowardice and laxity never allowed us – we now recognize – to take part in the movement, to become genuinely engaged… From fighters we were reduced to faithful followers. And then, naturally and definitively, each of us experienced a personal defeat within.” Second, the poetry of defeat is fatalist and defeatist: “We reproach it for lacking a deeper problematization and a creative deployment of Marxism. For although it clearly expresses a period of history, it also cultivates the illusion that this period and its attendant psychology will remain unchanged forever, as though the movement of history had come to a complete stop.” Art, Leivaditis argues, should not simply consist in the representation of life, but should aim for its total transformation, thus bringing us to a higher level of sensibility and understanding.

However, at the same time as Leivaditis makes the above Marxist critique, he is writing dark and despairing poems that seemingly undermine any optimistic faith, political or otherwise. Some of these poems are in fact published in the very same issue that included Leivaditis’ article on the poetry of defeat. A similar pessimistic and introspective trajectory is discernible in Leivaditis’ works in the decade from 1957 to 1967.

== Leivaditis' middle period: 1957–1967 ==
Leivaditis’ middle-period poetry works consist of: Συμφωνία αρ. 1 (‘Symphony #1’, 1957; winner of the 1958 Athens Municipality Poetry Prize), Οι γυναίκες με τ’ αλογίσια μάτια (‘The Horse-Eyed Women’, 1958), Καντάτα για δυο δισεκατομύρια φωνές (‘Cantata for Three Billion Voices’, 1960), 25η ραψωδία της Οδύσσειας (‘25th Rhapsody of the Odyssey’, 1963), Ποιήματα: 1958–1964 (‘Poems: 1958–1964’, 1965), and Οι τελευταίοι (‘The Last Ones’, 1966).

Leivaditis’ preceding work (consisting of the 1952–53 triptych, and the 1956 volume Ο άνθρωπος με το ταμπούρλο, ‘The Man with the Drum’) has been characterized as a ‘poetry of the battlefield’, a politically committed poetry reflecting the struggles of the resistance during World War II and of the Left during the civil war. From 1957, however, his work begins to turn away from the previous hopeful and heroic spirit to one burdened by an increasing sense of crisis and disillusionment: this change is signalled in the opening section of Symphony #1, with its recurring image of "the defeated soldiers, the defeated soldiers / have the silence of infinitude" (with the word 'silence' substituted later by 'sorrow' and 'hunger'). This middle period in Leivaditis’ career has been described by Dimitris Aggelis as “a period of utter sadness, marked by feelings of bankruptcy and humiliation, of guilt towards society and God.” Mihalis Meraklis views the middle period as “a turn towards the inner,” a move away from the previously optimistic, outward-looking works to an inward-looking, melancholic phase, where death in particular is no longer seen as part of a communal struggle for justice but as a threat to the meaning and coherence of an individual’s life. Apostolos Benatsis, one of Leivaditis’ leading commentators, thinks of the middle works not as examples of the ‘poetry of defeat’, but as “a poetry of awakening. The protagonist in these works awakens to the heroism of the past and the fluidity of the present. But he is not disheartened by what is happening around him. He can see that there exists a fighting core that resists, and this allows him to hope in his future vindication. The texts display a restrained optimism.”

Perhaps the most significant of these middle-period texts is Cantata, a verse drama set in “a neighborhood street in a modern city,” as “night is approaching.” The work begins and ends with the musings of a poet, who authors the drama itself and frequently interjects to set the scene or provide some commentary. Several secondary characters, or ‘passersby’ as they are called, are also included, though they don’t interact with one another and are identified not by their names but by such descriptions as the man whistling the ‘Paloma’, the wise man, the man with fiery eyes, and the skeptic. There is also a chorus, divided into a male chorus, which recounts adventures on the world stage (e.g. exploring and conquering new lands) and represents strength, vigour, fulfilment, and the affirmation of life; and a female chorus, which recounts experiences of prostitution, unrequited love, loneliness, abuse, madness, and deprivation, thus representing weakness, dejection, and life-weariness. All this serves as a frame for the “lovely tale…a story as old as the world” narrated by ‘the man with the cap’ to a group of admiring children. In this story, expressed in language reminiscent of the Gospels, an anonymous, Christ-like figure fighting for social justice is arrested, tortured, tried and executed. But as with the Gospels, this is not the end of the story: the protagonist’s execution takes place at “that time of the day when the resplendent sun comes out. / And life begins.” As the male chorus chants, “our flag is immortal from thousands of deaths!”, the authorities discover that the executed man has seemingly come back to life: “And they asked one another: What’s going on? He hasn’t risen from the dead, has he? / And they laughed, for miracles don’t happen in our times – an uncertain laughter.” The work ends with the poet approaching the front of the stage and exclaiming:

Because, truly, my friends, tell me, what is it be all-powerful

other than to have this boundless thirst. To be so short-lived,

and yet have dreams that are eternal!

== Dictatorship: 1967–1974 ==
After the military coup of April 21, 1967, the newspaper Leivaditis worked for as a literary critic, The Dawn, was shut down and Leivaditis found himself out of work. In early 1969, he was invited to write for the popular weekly magazine, Fantazio (Φαντάζιο), and under the pseudonym ‘A. Rokos’ (Α. Pόκος) he contributed a series of articles on Modern Greek writers as well as adaptations of works by English, French and Russian authors.

During the early years of the dictatorship, when a strict regime of censorship was in place, Leivaditis followed the practice of many other writers in refusing to publish any of their own work and thus avoiding the degrading requirement of having to seek the approval of the censor’s office. This ‘silent boycott’ was broken once preventive censorship was lifted on November 15, 1969, and after a six-year silence Leivaditis began publishing his own poetry again, beginning with Νυχτερινός Επισκέπτης (‘Night Visitor’) in 1972.

== Leivaditis' later work ==
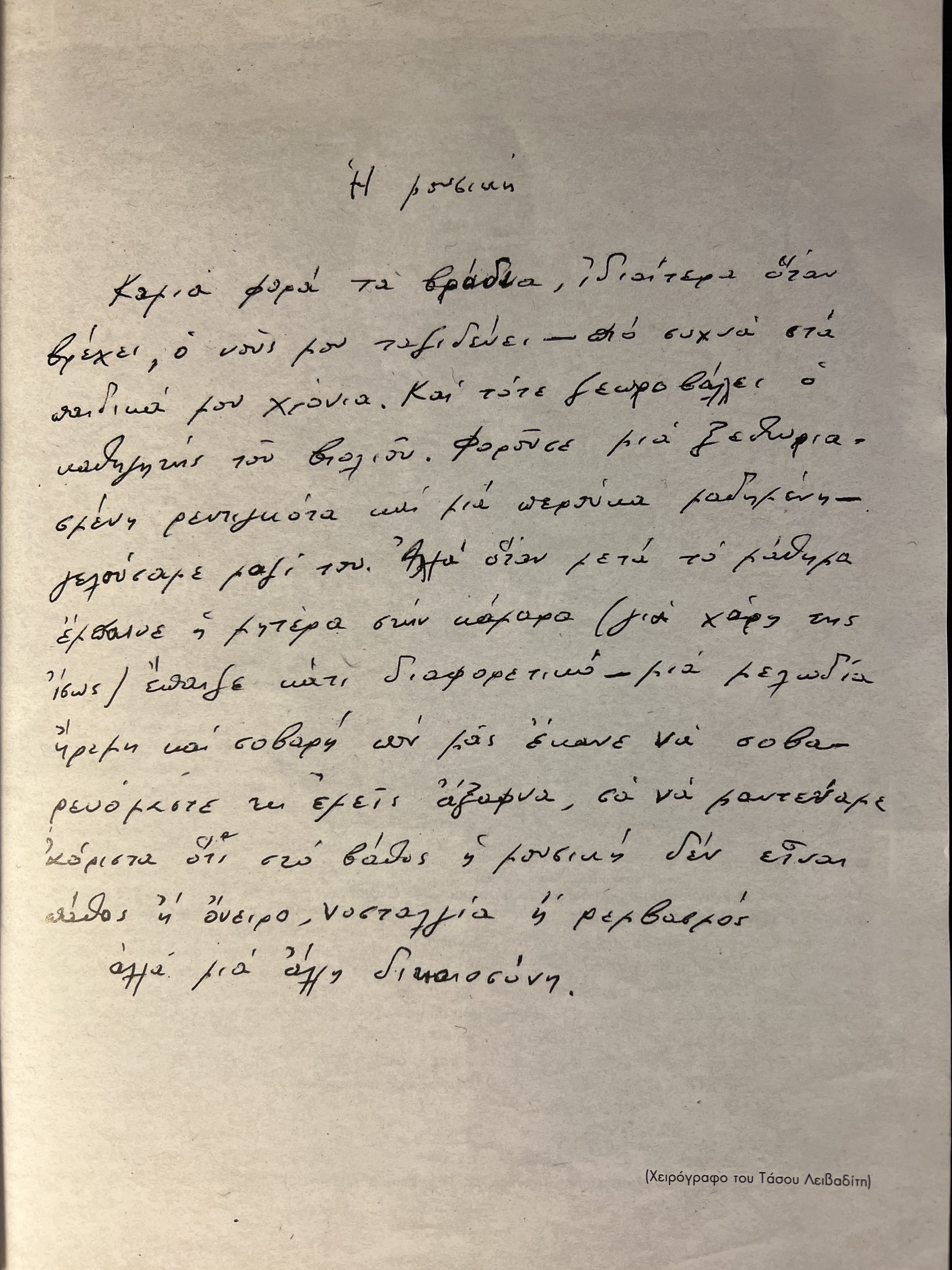
Manuscript of Leivaditis' poem, "Music" (from Violets for a Season)

The final, and most productive, phase of Leivaditis’ career featured the following works of poetry: Νυχτερινός επισκέπτης (‘Night Visitor’, 1972), Σκοτεινή πράξη (‘Dark Deed’, 1974), Οι τρεις (‘The Three’, 1975), Ο διάβολος με το κηροπήγιο (‘The Devil with the Candlestick’, 1975), Βιολί για μονόχειρα (‘Violin for One-Armed Player’, 1976), Ανακάλυψη (‘Discovery’, 1977), Εγχειρίδιο ευθανασίας (‘Euthanasia Manual’, 1979), Ο τυφλός με τον λύχνο (‘The Blind Man with the Lamp’, 1983), Βιολέτες για μια εποχή (‘Violets for a Season’, 1985), and Μικρό βιβλίο για μεγάλα όνειρα (‘A Small Book for Big Dreams’, 1987). Violin for One-Armed Player was runner-up in the National Poetry Prize for 1976, while Euthanasia Manual won the prize in 1979.

Night Visitor (1972) marks another turning-point in Leivaditis’ oeuvre, for with this work he makes a definitive break from his youthful idealism and opens up a new path that is not only more solitary and sorrowful, but also more philosophical, if not metaphysical and mystical than what is found in earlier writings. In a manner reminiscent of existentialist literature, questions about the meaning and value of life now loom large, but they go unanswered in a world depicted as unresponsive or even hostile to human concerns. As Leivaditis put it in the final lines of a poem entitled “The Key to the Mystery,” from Euthanasia Manual:

…but how many questions in the world have answers? and sincerity always begins there, where all other paths to salvation have come to an end.

Stylistically, too, there is a marked changed from 1972, as Leivaditis’ writing becomes more allusive, symbolic, lyrical and condensed. He now begins to employ and perfect the form of the ‘prose-poem’: compact, fragmented vignettes which often run to no more than a paragraph or two. Sometimes only a few sentences are necessary, as with this masterful example, entitled “Aesthetics”, from Violets for a Season:

As for that story there are many versions. The best one though is always the one where you cry.

Even though scenes of decline and disintegration, death and suicide, are common in Leivaditis’ later works, these do not exclude rays of unexpected joy, delight in memories of childhood and comradely struggles, and wonder in the inscrutable and the ordinary, ranging from the sounds of a swallow to the raindrops against a café window and the colours of twilight: if only we could understand what these are trying to tell us, Leivaditis insists, we will finally have discovered the meaning of the universe. Alas, this great secret is one that each of us will take to the grave, “without finding out what it is – neither we, nor anyone else.” The quotation is from Leivaditis’ final collection, Autumn Manuscripts (Τα χειρόγραφα του φθινοπώρου), which was published posthumously in 1990.

Leivaditis died on 30 October 1988, aged only 66, after undergoing two lengthy, but ultimately unsuccessful, surgical procedures to correct an abdominal aortic aneurism. He was granted a state funeral and was buried in the First Cemetery of Athens. At his funeral the celebrated Greek actress and then Minister of Culture, Melina Mercouri, proclaimed: “Leivaditis has departed at the height of his powers, having won the praises of critics and the universal recognition of our people, who read him, sung his verses, understood and loved him. He chose to depart without flags and banners. He chose to depart the way he lived: as a poet.”

== Prose fiction, film and music ==
Apart from poetry, Leivaditis also contributed to other artistic genres, including prose fiction, film and music.

In 1966, Leivaditis’ collection of short stories, The Pendulum (Το εκκρεμές) was published. Alexandros Argyriou describes these stories as ‘kafkaesque’ and ‘dream-like’, but where the dreams include nightmares. In the story, “The Suspect Arm,” for example, we are presented with a case of Darwinian evolution in reverse, where a man wakes up to find himself transformed into an ape. Although Leivaditis’ fiction has been overshadowed by his poetry, the critic Alexis Ziras ascribes great significance to the stories, arguing that they prefigure the philosophical crisis and literary style that were to become prominent in Leivaditis’ later poems.

Leivaditis also wrote the screenplay for two films, together with longtime friend, playwright and novelist, Kostas Kotzias (1921-79). The first of these was for the now-classic film, Συνοικία το Όνειρο (‘Neighborhood of Dreams’, 1961, directed by Alekos Alexandrakis), which caused an uproar at the time for its realistic portrayal of the slums of Athens. The other screenplay was for the film, Θρίαμβος (‘Triumph’, 1962, directed by Alekos Alexandrakis and Aristeidis Karydis-Fuchs).

Finally, Leivaditis wrote lyrics to many popular songs, sometimes for film, and set to music by the likes of Mikis Theodorakis, Manos Loizos, and Mimis Plessas. Leivaditis’ collaboration with Theodorakis included a ten-day concert tour of regional areas of Greece in October 1961, where Leivaditis would recite his poems in between Theodorakis’ performances.

== Translations of Leivaditis' works ==
Although Leivaditis is well known and much loved in Greece, he remains relatively unknown to non-Greek-speaking audiences. But this is beginning to change as more of his work is now being translated into English and other languages.

=== English translations ===
Leivaditis was first translated into English by the Greek-American poet and translator, Nikos Spanias (Νίκος Σπάνιας, 1924-1990), in his Resistance, Exile and Love: An Anthology of Post-War Greek Poetry, published in 1977. Spanias includes six poems by Leivaditis, whom he characterizes as “one of the best poets of his generation,” and states that his poems “have a piercing directness and a breathtaking simplicity.”

Leivaditis has also been translated by Kimon Friar (1911–1993, well known as the translator of Kazantzakis’ Odyssey), firstly in the November 1981 issue of the Chicago-based magazine Poetry (vol. 139, three poems on pp.92-93); and then, the following year, in an issue of kayak, which has been described as, “from 1964 to 1984, arguably the preeminent little poetry magazine in the United States.” For this issue, Friar contributed a one-page introduction to Leivaditis, followed by eleven translated poems (kayak, vol. 58, 1982, pp.3-7).

Leivaditis’ poems have also appeared in various English-language anthologies of Greek poetry, including: Modern Greek Poetry: An Anthology (published in 2003), which includes Nanos Valaoritis’ translation of 17 poems from Euthanasia Manual; and A Century of Greek Poetry:1900-2000 (published in 2004), which includes six poems translated by David Connolly. Connolly has also translated one of Leivaditis’ short stories, “A Day Like Any Other”, in The Dedalus Book of Greek Fantasy (2004).

More comprehensive translations have only begun to appear more recently, and these include Manolis Aligizakis’ translation of a large selection of Leivaditis’ poetry in Tasos Livaditis: Selected Poems (Libros Libertad, 2014, reissued in an expanded edition in 2022); and N.N. Trakakis’ translations of a number of individual volumes, including The Blind Man with the Lamp (Denise Harvey Publications, 2014), Violets for a Season (Red Dragonfly Press, 2017), Autumn Manuscripts (Smokestack Books, 2020), Enchiridion Euthanasiæ (Human Side Press, 2021), and Tasos Leivaditis’ Triptych (Anthem Press, 2022).

=== Other translations ===
Leivaditis’ work has been translated into several languages other than English, including:

- Russian: Kantata dlya tryokh milliardov golosovi (Moscow: Progress, 1968).
- Albanian: Fryn ne unhekry, qet e botes, trans. Aleks Caci (Tirana: Naim Frasheri Publishing, 1978).
- Hungarian: Kantata hárommiliárd hangra, trans. Kálman Szabó and Arpád Papp (Budapest: Európa, 1980).
- French: Petit livre pour grands reves, trans. Aki Roukas and Mimy Kinet (Brussels: Centre Helleniques, 1995); L’aveugle et sa chandelle: choix de poèmes, trans. Patricia Lenoir (Prades-le-Lez: Éditions Monemvassia, 2017).
- Italian: 25a rapsodia dell’odissea, trans. Salvatore Giammancheri (Athens, 2002).
- Turkish: Bir Yel Esiyor Dünya Kavşaklarinda, trans. Panayot Abaci (Istanbul: Evrensel Basim Yayin, 2006).
- Serbian: Violina za jednorukog, trans. Gaga Rosic (Zrenjanin: Agora, 2009).

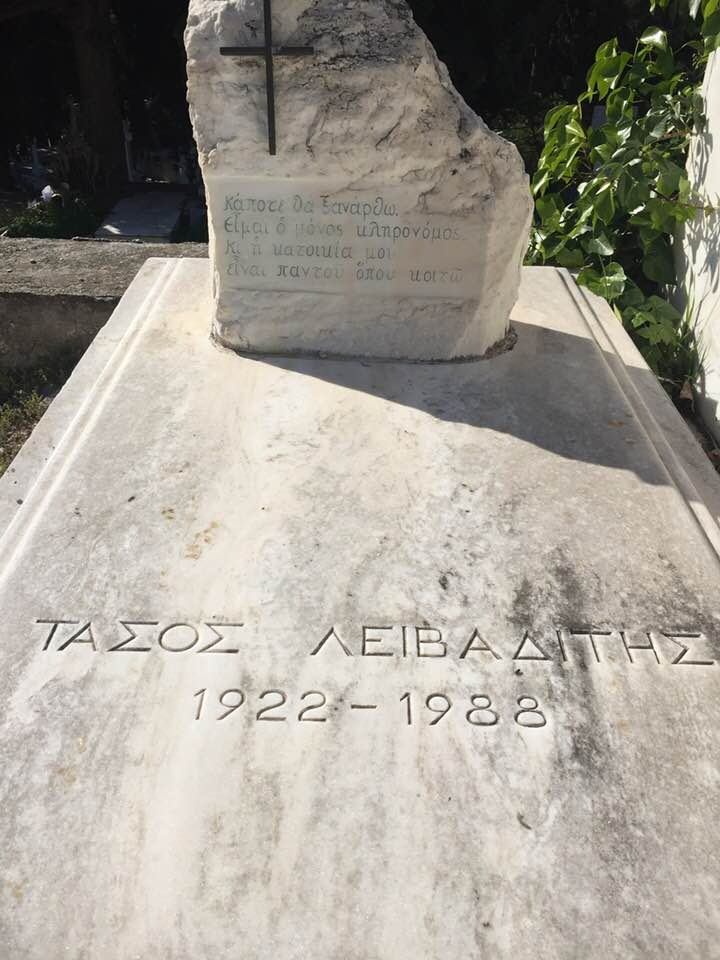
Tasos Leivaditis' grave (First Cemetery of Athens). The headstone reads: "Someday I will return. I am the only heir. And my dwelling lies wherever I look." (from poem entitled "Prologue to Eternity" in The Blind Man with the Lamp)

Translations of select poems have also appeared in various non-English anthologies of Greek literature, including ones published in Chinese, Italian, Polish, Dutch, German, Russian, and Swedish.

== See also ==
- Modern Greek literature
- Entry on Tasos Leivaditis in Greek version of Wikipedia
