= The Voice of the Heart =

The Voice of the Heart may refer to:

- The Voice of the Heart (1924 film), a German silent drama film
- The Voice of the Heart (1937 film), a German drama film
- Voice of the Heart (film), a 1942 German drama film
- The Voice of the Heart (1943 film), a Greek drama film
- Voice of the Heart (album), a 1983 album by Carpenters
- Voice of the Heart, a 1989 TV movie based on a story by Barbara Taylor Bradford
- Voice of the Heart , a song by Diana Ross, from the album Take Me Higher
- "Voice of Heart Theme", a track by Sundar C. Babu from the soundtrack of the 2006 Indian film Chithiram Pesuthadi
