= Deluxe Crazy =

1963 Greek film directed by Stefanos Fotiadis

- Greek: Τρελοί πολυτελείας
- Directed by: Stefanos Fotiadis
- Written by: Stefanos Fotiadis
- Produced by: Nikos Varveris
- Starring: Giorgos Pantzas; Mimis Fotopoulos; Giannis Gkionakis; Alekos Livaditis; Giorgos Konstantinou; Eleni Anoussaki; Kaiti Panou; Giorogs Tsitsopoulos; Rena Dor
- Release date: 1963
- Running time: 90 minutes
- Country: Greece
- Language: Greek

Deluxe Crazy (Greek: Τρελοί πολυτελείας) is a 1963 Greek film directed by Stefanos Fotiadis and starring Giorgos Pantzas, Mimis Fotopoulos and Giannis Gkionakis.

== Plot ==
A young relative of a rich family was love-struck with a theatrical lady with the different untamed character and pressures with his family that did not had the time to come. As the movie did not have from it greatest from their family, received to bring an abundant laughs due to its much great stars of the movie.

== Cast ==
- Giorgos Pantzas ..... Fedon Zarangis
- Mimis Fotopoulos ..... Kyriakos
- Giannis Gionakis ..... Babis
- Alekos Livaditis ..... Lazaros
- Giorgos Konstantinou ..... Minas
- Eleni Anousaki ..... Marina
- Kaiti Panou ..... Melpo
- Giorgos Tsitsopoulos ..... Alekos
- Rena Dor ..... Theano Skropolithra
- Kostas Mentis ..... postman
- Clairi Deligianni ..... Yiouli

== See also ==
- List of Greek films
