= The Drunkard (1950 film) =

O methystakas
- Directed by: George Tzavellas
- Written by: George Tzavellas
- Produced by: Finos Film
- Starring: Orestis Makris
- Cinematography: Joseph Hepp
- Edited by: Filopoimin Finos
- Release date: 23 January 1950 (Greece)
- Running time: 105 minutes
- Country: Greece
- Language: Greek

The Drunkard (Greek: Ο μεθύστακας), is a 1950 Greek drama film written and directed by George Tzavellas. It was the highest grossing Greek film in 1950, selling 304,438 tickets.

== Plot ==
Haralambos Lardis (Orestis Makris) is a poor cobbler in Plaka who has become a drunkard and the laughing stock of his neighborhood after the death of his son during the Greco-Italian War. His daughter, Anna, (Billy Konstantopoulou) falls in love with the son of her boss Alec Bakas (Dimitris Horn) and they plan to marry. Her father attempts to overcome his addiction not wanting to embarrass himself in front of the rich family of his future son-in-law, but gets drunk before meeting the Bakas family. Realizing that he is an obstacle to his daughter's happiness, he commits suicide bringing the two families closer.

== Cast ==
- Orestis Makris ..... Haralambos Lardis
- Dimitris Horn ..... Alec Bakas
- Billy Konstantopoulou ..... Anna Lardi
- Athanasia Moustaka ..... grandmother
- Nikos Rizos ..... pub customer
- Thanos Tzeneralis ..... doctor
- Anna Kyriakou ..... Betty Baboulia
- Katia Linda ..... Kaiti
- Rena Stratigou ..... Dolly

== Notes ==
"The Drunkard" was the first big commercial success in Greece. Finos Film established itself as the dominant film production company in Greece. With his iconic portrayal of the drunkard, Orestis Makris became one of the most important actors of Greek cinema.
