= Dimitris Horn =

Greek actor (1921–1998)

- Born: March 9, 1921; Athens, Greece
- Died: January 16, 1998 (age 76)
- Alma mater: National Theatre of Greece Drama School
- Occupation: Singer, film actor, stage actor
- Spouse(s): Anna Goulandri
- Partner(s): Ellie Lambeti
- Awards: Gold Cross of the Order of George I

Dimitris Horn (Greek: Δημήτρης Χορν) (9 March 1921 – 16 January 1998) was a Greek theatrical and film actor.

== Biography ==
Horn was born in Athens in 1921, the son of playwright Pantelis Horn (himself descended from an Austrian father and Greek mother), and Euterpi, a Pontic Greek. He studied Drama at the National Theatre of Greece Drama School, where he made his stage debut in 1941. During his career, he co-operated many times with the Greek National Theater and made personal stage troops with actors such as Mary Aroni, Alekos Alexandrakis and Ellie Lambeti. The latter was also his companion from 1953 to 1958.

From an early stage he developed a reputation as "the best actor of his generation," performing many classics such as "Diary of a Madman" by Nikolai Gogol, Richard III by William Shakespeare, Dom Juan by Molière, and Enrico IV by Luigi Pirandello to critical acclaim.

His screen work was less important to him; he disliked cinema, only starring in ten films. His most notable films were The Counterfeit Coin (1954) and A Girl in Black (1956). He later married shipping heiress Anna Goulandri, and became the first director of the Greek State Radio and Television after the restoration of democracy. He died of cancer on 16 January 1998, aged 76.

== Filmography ==
- The Voice of the Heart (I Foni tis kardias) (1943) .... Petros
- Applause (Hirokrotimata) (1944) .... Stefanos
- The Drunkard (Methistakas) (1950) .... Alec Bakas
- Windfall in Athens (Kyriakatiko xypnima) (1954) .... Alexis Lorentzatos
- The Counterfeit Sovereign (Kalpiki lira) (1955) .... Pavlos
- The Girl in Black (To Koritsi me ta mavra) (1956) .... Pavlos
- We Have Only One Life (Mia zoi tin echoume) (1958) .... Kleon
- A Thief's First Chance (Mia tou klefti) (1960) .... Pavlos Lignos
- Woe to the Young (Alimono stous neous) (1961) .... Andreas
- Athens by Night (I Athina tin nychta) (1962) .... Himself

== See also ==
- Dimitris Horn Award
