= O striglos pou egine arnaki =

- Directed by: Alekos Sakellarios
- Starring: Lambros Konstantaras; Maro Kontou
- Music by: Giorgos Katsaros
- Release date: 22 January 1968
- Running time: 1h 20min
- Country: Greece
- Language: Greek

O striglos pou egine arnaki (Greek: Ο στρίγγλος που έγινε αρνάκι, "The Stern Man Who Became a Lamb") is a 1968 Greek comedy film directed by Alekos Sakellarios. It is based on the play Mia kyria atyhisasa (Greek: Μια κυρία ατύχησε, "A Lady Had Bad Luck") by Alekos Sakellarios and Christos Giannakopolous.

== Cast ==
- Lambros Konstantaras - Leonidas Petroheilos
- Maro Kontou - Mary Hatzithoma
- Pavlos Liaros - Kimon Petroheilos
- Thanos Papadopoulos - Andreas Petroheilos
- Vangelis Ioannidis - Babis Petroheilos
- Mitsi Konstadara - Despoina Anifantouli
- Stavros Xenidis - Xenofon
- Vasilis Georgiadis
- Giorgos Kyriakidis
- Kostas Papachristos - officer
