= Maria Plyta =

Greek film director and screenwriter

- Born: 27 November 1915; Thessaloniki, Greece
- Died: 4 March 2006 (age 90); Athens, Greece
- Citizenship: Greek
- Occupations: Director, screenwriter, editor
- Years active: 1948–1972
- Known for: Being the first female Greek cinema director

Maria Plyta (27 November 1915 – 4 March 2006) was a Greek screenwriter and film director. She was known for her work with the melodramatic and her capacity to convey a distinctly feminine sense of culture, civilization and identity. Through her work, she managed to create the space that is necessary for a female voice to speak in the first person and be heard.

== Early life ==
Not much is available regarding Plyta’s personal life as she maintained a relatively quiet life and spent much of her time away from the spotlight. She was born in Thessaloniki on November 26, 1915, and became a single mother in adulthood, it is not known what happened to her partner, only that her last name was hyphenated until 1954. She stated once that she never pictured herself working in film until she found herself "alone and with little money", presumably after becoming a single woman. She worked as a novelist and playwright prior to stepping into the film industry. Following the German occupation, she released her first novels, Bound Wings in 1944 and Chains in 1946. Her first role in the film industry was that of artistic director and producer for the films Marinos Kontaras and Marina. Her directing career began in 1948 with her adaption of Dimitris Bogris's The Engagements (T’arravoniasmata), released in 1950 and featuring Aimilios Veakis in the leading role.

She recounts, in the only known interview she ever gave, in 1979 that she was inclined to become a filmmaker for two reasons: to see her characters portrayed on screen and to support herself financially.

== Career ==
Maria Plyta is considered a pioneer in Greek cinema. Working alongside Athenian writers and directors Alekos Sakellarios and Giorgios Tzavellas, she managed to slowly begin creating a name for herself in a heavily male-dominated field. For the first time in Greek cinematic history, female experience was becoming a central narrative through the newfound establishment of the female gaze. Her debut film, The Engagements, which was based on a play by the same name, was released in 1950, and it marked the first time a woman in Greece was credited as the director.

Plyta was known for her use of the melodramatic as a genre. Her work is characterized by dark atmospheres depicting trauma and loss through her interior settings, lighting, and effective camera shots. When asked what she thought the melodramatic consisted of, she replied: “The melodramatic was not only in the whole of the story but also in the direction. For example, if someone was stubborn, we took it out through a close-up of the clenched fist." She used physicality and physical elements within her scenes to establish metaphors in her melodramatic movies, such as the depiction of alienation through domestic chores, or coercion through brief glimpses into the bedroom. The most obvious example of this skill can be found in the 1962 film, The Shoe-Shine Boy, when two young characters begin to have sex and a cross appears above them on the wall symbolizing the relationship of the practice of marriage with regard to intercourse. She was also recognized for her skills in representing the individual as a focal point within the social fabric. She was consistently meticulous with regards to the designs of her work despite budget restrictions, prejudice, and rejection based on her gender and lack of experience.

Plyta worked over the span of two decades to provide a unique perspective into the lives of marginalized outcast individuals. From her first film to her last she presented strong-willed, individual women, disrupting the societal expectations of the viewers.

== Complete filmography ==
*Please note that translations vary regarding the film titles

Year	Film	Credited as	Notes	Ref.
1972	A Mother is Accused	Writer		
1972	Far From Home	Writer		
1970	Unknown Woman of the Night	Director, writer		
1967	The Poor Merchant	Director, writer		
1967	Between Two Women	Writer		
1966	Proxenitra, Praktor 017	Writer	uncredited	
1965	The Victor	Director, writer		
1964	Uphill	Director, writer		
1963	The Prodigal Son	Director, writer		
1963	Jealousy	Writer		
1962	The Shoe-Shine Boy	Director, writer		
1961	You Came Too Late	Director		
1960	I Am A Man and...I Will Do As I Please	Director, writer		
1959	Moment of Passion	Director		
1958	Only for One Night	Director		
1957	Jeep, Kiosk and Land	Director		
1956	The Duchess of Plakendia	Director, writer, editor		
1954	The Girl of the Neighbourhood	Director, editor		
1953	Eva	Director, editor*	*as Maria Plyta-Hatzinakou	
1952	The Godson	Director*	*as Maria Plyta-Hatzinakou	
1951	The She-Wolf	Director, writer*	*as Maria Plyta-Hatzinakou	
1950	The Engagements	Director, writer*	*as Maria Plyta-Hatzinakou	

== Selected filmography ==
- The She-Wolf (1951)
- Eva (1953)
- The Duchess of Plakendia (1956)

== Bibliography ==
- Karalis, Vrasidas (2012). A History of Greek Cinema (1st ed.). New York City: Bloomsbury Publishing. ISBN 978-1441194473.
