= Kiki Morfoniou =

Greek operatic singer (1936–2025)

- Born: 1936; Athens, Greece
- Died: December 18, 2025 (aged 88–89); Athens, Greece
- Occupation: Operatic mezzo-soprano

Kiki Morfoniou (Greek: Κική Μορφωνιού, 1936 – December 18, 2025) was a Greek operatic mezzo-soprano. She performed with the Greek National Opera (GNO) for three decades from 1958 until she joined its board in the 1990s. She performed at many opera festivals, including the Athens Epidaurus Festival in 1960, when she was Adalgisa in Norma by Vincenzo Bellini, while Maria Callas was Norma. She joined the voice faculty at the Athens Conservatoire in 1974, and received a plaque from the GNO in 2023.
