= The Wandering Jew (1933 film) =

1933 film

- Directed by: Maurice Elvey
- Written by: H. Fowler Mear from the play by Temple Thurston
- Produced by: Julius Hagen
- Starring: Conrad Veidt; Marie Ney; Anne Grey
- Cinematography: Sydney Blythe
- Edited by: Jack Harris
- Music by: Hugo Riesenfeld
- Production company: Julius Hagen Productions
- Distributed by: Gaumont British Distributors
- Release date: 15 November 1933
- Running time: 111 minutes
- Country: United Kingdom
- Language: English

The Wandering Jew is a 1933 British fantasy drama film directed by Maurice Elvey and starring Conrad Veidt, Peggy Ashcroft, Francis L. Sullivan, and Felix Aylmer. It was written by H. Fowler Mear based on the 1921 play of the same title by Temple Thurston, previously made into a 1923 silent film. It was produced by the Gaumont-Twickenham Film Studios and recounts the tale of a Jew who is forced to wander the Earth for centuries because he rebuffed Jesus while he was carrying his cross.

== Plot ==
The plot follows the eponymous character's epic journey. He is finally burnt at the stake by the Spanish Inquisition. As he burns, he is forgiven by God and finally allowed to die. The story is a retelling of the myth of the Wandering Jew, dating back to the 13th century, and bears a resemblance to the legend of the Flying Dutchman.

== Cast ==
- Conrad Veidt as Mathathias
- Marie Ney as Judith
- Basil Gil as Pontius Pilate
- Cicely Oates as Rachel
- Anne Grey as Joan de Baudricourt
- Dennis Hoey as Lord de Baudricourt
- Bertram Wallis as Prince Bohemund of Tarentum
- Hector Abbas as Isaachar the Miser
- Kenji Takase as Phirous
- Jack Livesey as Godfrey, Duke of Normandy
- Joan Maude as Gianella
- John Stuart as Pietro Morelli
- Arnold Lucy as Andrea Michelloti
- Peggy Ashcroft as Ollala Quintana
- Francis L. Sullivan as Archbishop Juan de Texada
- Abraham Sofaer as Zapportas
- Felix Aylmer as Ferera
- Ivor Barnard as Castro

== Reception ==
Kine Weekly wrote: "This is one of the very best pictures ever made by Stoll's, and the subject, although a difficult one, lends itself to excellent opportunities for producer, actors, cameraman and art director. Exploitation of the star has been as sound as the development of the pictorial and dramatic possibilities. It suffers, in our opinion, chiefly by reason of its length, particularly in the third period set in medical Italy, and judicious trimming would easily avert a tendency to boredom here and there. Much care and thought are clearly indicated in the details of settings and dresses. The four changes of period afford interesting variety in settings. 'The religious element is a little too evident at times, and the emblems might have been seen a little less often. The strong, picturesque character of the representative Jew, set in four different periods of history, makes a very real, dramatic and pictorial appeal. There is no propaganda to make the exhibitor nervous, and the graphic and exotic production, together with fine acting, cannot fail to impress."

Variety wrote: "The Wandering Jew is a beautiful production, a histrionic triumph – and most likely a commercial error. For the auditor it's at one and the same time a bore and a mental hazard – an adventure of mind over matter which is bound to leave the average cinema patron in an uncomfortable state. The reopening of ancient racial wounds, the rehash of a legend that is an admixture of mythology, mysticism, secular law, tradition, hearsay and religious symbolism, against a background of historical and fictional occurrences, makes The Wandering Jew a problem, It's not entertainment. It's not enlightenment, It's not even propaganda, one way or the other – it's just disturbing"

== Portrayal of Jews ==
Unlike the Nazis' 1940 antisemitic propaganda film The Eternal Jew, The Wandering Jew portrays Jews as the victims of unjustified persecution throughout history, such as during the Spanish Inquisition. The version made under the Third Reich, by contrast, was intended to be virulently antisemitic.
