= 13th British Academy Film Awards =

1960 film awards ceremony

- Date: 1960

Highlights
- Best Film: Ben-Hur
- Best British Film: Sapphire
- Most awards: I'm All Right Jack (2)
- Most nominations: The Nun's Story (5)

The 13th British Academy Film Awards, given by the British Academy of Film and Television Arts in 1960, honoured the best films of 1959.

== Winners and nominees ==
=== Best Film ===
Ben-Hur

- Anatomy of a Murder
- Ansiktet
- The Big Country
- Compulsion
- Gigi
- Look Back in Anger
- North West Frontier
- The Nun's Story
- Sapphire
- Some Like It Hot
- Tiger Bay
- Yesterday's Enemy
- Maigret tend un piège
- Ashes and Diamonds

=== Best British Film ===
Sapphire

- Look Back in Anger
- Anatomy of a Murder
- Tiger Bay
- Yesterday's Enemy

=== Best Foreign Actor ===
Jack Lemmon in Some Like It Hot

- James Stewart in Anatomy of a Murder
- Takashi Shimura in Ikiru
- Zbigniew Cybulski in Ashes and Diamonds
- Jean Gabin in Maigret tend un piège
- Jean Desailly in Maigret tend un piège

=== Best British Actor ===
Peter Sellers in I'm All Right Jack

- Laurence Olivier in The Devil's Disciple
- Laurence Harvey in Expresso Bongo
- Richard Burton in Look Back in Anger
- Peter Finch in The Nun's Story
- Stanley Baker in Yesterday's Enemy
- Gordon Jackson in Yesterday's Enemy

=== Best British Actress ===
Audrey Hepburn in The Nun's Story

- Kay Walsh in The Horse's Mouth
- Sylvia Syms in No Trees in the Street
- Peggy Ashcroft in The Nun's Story
- Yvonne Mitchell in Sapphire

=== Best Foreign Actress ===
Shirley MacLaine in Ask Any Girl

- Rosalind Russell in Auntie Mame
- Susan Hayward in I Want to Live!
- Ava Gardner in On The Beach
- Ellie Lambeti in A Matter of Dignity

=== Best British Screenplay ===
I'm All Right Jack - Frank Harvey, John Boulting and Alan Hackney
