= The Parting Song (film) =

- Directed by: Filopimin Finos
- Written by: Dimitris Bogris
- Starring: Evgenia Danika; Labros Konstadaras; Linda Miranda; Alekos Livaditis
- Cinematography: Kostas Drimaropoulos; Yannis Drimaropoulos
- Edited by: Emil Provelengios
- Music by: Giorgos Mallidis
- Production companies: Finos Films; Skouras Films
- Release date: April 15, 1940
- Running time: 75 minutes
- Country: Greece
- Language: Greek

The Parting Song (Greek:To tragoudi tou horismou) is a 1940 Greek drama film directed by Filopimin Finos and starring Evgenia Danika, Labros Konstadaras and Linda Miranda. It was the only film directed by Finos, better-known for running the production company Finos Films. The film was long thought to be lost after it was destroyed by the Germans during the Occupation of Greece, but a fragmented copy was discovered in Egypt.

The film is notable as the first Greek film to be processed in a Greek technical laboratory (previous films had been processed abroad) which had been built by Finos Films. The film was a commercial failure on its release, and met a hostile reception from critics.

== Synopsis ==
While holidaying on the island of Hydra, a wealthy Athenian woman meets and falls in love with a local fisherman. She seduces him away from his girlfriend and takes him with her to the city to pursue a career as a singer. Despite enjoying success, he decides that city life is not for him and returns to his home and his previous girlfriend who really loves him.

== Cast ==
- Evgenia Danika as Miranda
- Labros Konstadaras as Konstadis
- Linda Miranda as Zoitsa
- Petros Epitropakis as Konstadis
- Giorgos Anaktoridis
- Maria Benipsalti
- Alekos Livaditis as Zarganas
- Mimis Moshoutis
- Nana Papadopoulou
- Kostas Papageorgiou

== Bibliography ==
- Petrakis, Marina. The Metaxas Myth: Dictatorship and Propaganda in Greece. I.B.Tauris, 2011.
