= A Matter of Dignity =

1957 film

- DVD cover
- Directed by: Michael Cacoyannis
- Written by: Michael Cacoyannis
- Starring: Ellie Lambeti
- Cinematography: Walter Lassally
- Edited by: Giorgos Tsaoulis
- Release date: 10 February 1958
- Running time: 112 minutes
- Country: Greece
- Language: Greek

A Matter of Dignity (Greek: Το τελευταίο ψέμα, translit. To teleftaio psema) is a 1958 Greek drama film directed by Michael Cacoyannis. It was entered into the 1958 Cannes Film Festival.

== Plot ==
The Pellas are magnates who face financial ruin. Desperate to conceal the dire straits they are in and maintain their social status, they pressure their beautiful daughter Chloe to marry a wealthy but dull man. She agrees, but struggles to keep up appearances and not reveal her family's financial difficulties. She is instead interested in an older, poor man, who helps her see her family's cruelty and detachment from reality.

Meanwhile, the family has not paid their maid, Katerina, for her work, who needs the money to care for her injured toddler son. She dies of a heart attack while demanding her wages. Chloe's mother, Roxanni, attempts to hide her involvement in the death to keep dignity for the family, but Chloe leaves instead of getting involved, leaving behind her engagement ring. She takes Katerina's son to a feast day for him to be cured through a miracle, ending the film holding him, having left behind her wealthy lifestyle.

== Cast ==
- Ellie Lambeti as Chloe Pella
- Athena Michailidou as Roxanni Pella
- Eleni Zafeiriou as Katerina
- Giorgos Pappas as Kleon Pellas (as Georgios Pappas)
- Michalis Nikolinakos as Galanos
- Dimitris Papamichael as Markos
- Minas Christidis as Nikos Dritsas
- Vasilis Kailas as Vasilakis (as Vasilakis Kailas)
- Zorz Sarri
- Despo Diamantidou
- Mary Chronopoulou
- Despoina Nikolaidou
- Dimitris Hoptiris
- Dimitra Zeza
- Nikos Fermas
- Nikos Kourkoulos

== Awards and nominations ==
Year	Award	Category	Recipient(s)	Result
1958	Cannes Film Festival	Palme d'Or	Michael Cacoyannis	Nominated
1960	British Academy Film Awards	Best Foreign Actress	Ellie Lambeti	Nominated
