= Alekos Livaditis =

Greek actor (1914–1980)

Alekos Livaditis Αλέκος Λειβαδίτης
- Born: 1914; Athens
- Died: March 23, 1980 (aged 65–66); Athens
- Occupation: actor
- Years active: 1948 – 1980

Alekos Livaditis (Greek: Αλέκος Λειβαδίτης; 1914 – March 23, 1980) was a Greek actor in theatre and cinema. He was the son of Lissandros.

== Biography ==
He was a graduate of the Central Trade School. His first appearance was in the movie To tragoudi tou horismou (The Divorce Song). He also played in Voice of the Heart (1942), I vila me ta noufara (1944), Gambros me dossis (1947), O emiris ke o kakomiris (1963), etc. He took part in the empty hermitage as he disappeared from prose theater with Christoforos Nezer and Anna Lori in 1948 at the Akropol. From then he participated in great acts including Kalouta-Krevata-Rena Dor in 1949, Kalouta only in 1950 and later with Orestis Makris, Vassilis Avlonitis, Nikos Stavridis, Rena Vlachopoulou, K. Hadjihristou, Kaiti Diridaua and Sofia Vebo in many musical presentations and comedies.

He began writing articles in 1949 elsewhere in Egypt, Cyprus, Istanbul in which he done in 1951 until 1951. From 1968 until 1971, he done many articles in all of the cities in Greece.

Livaditis was also a director in the movie 100,000 Pounds, he was a member of the Greek Actors Guild (SEI), and president of the SEI Revenue Countil. He was awarded by George II of Greece with a metal during the Albanian War along with King Paul for his presentation in Greece and around the world. He was also awarded by the Patriarchate of Alexandria. He lived alone in the Votanikos neighbourhood in Athens and died there in 1980, aged 66.

== Selected filmography ==
Year	Film	Transliteration and translation	Role
1939	The Parting Song	Το τραγούδι του χωρισμού The Divorce/Separation Song	-
1943	Voice of the Heart	Η φωνή της καρδιάς I foni tis kardias	garsoni in a tavern
1945	I vila me ta noufara	Η βίλα με τα νούφαρα	-
1945	Rayismenes kardies	Ραγισμένες καρδιές Breakable Heart?	-
1946	Papoutsi apo ton topo sou	Παπούτσι από τον τόπο σου	-
1948	100,000 Pounds	100.000 λίρες 100.000 lires	Frixos
1950	Stratiotes dichos stoli	Στρατιώτες δίχως στολή	Mihalis
1960	Snow White and the Seven Dwarves	Η Χιονάτη και τα 7 γεροντοπαλίκαρα I Hionati ke ta 7 gerondopalikara	Omiros Alexandrou, musician
1963	The Lazy Dog	Το τεμπελόσκυλο To tebeloskylo	Romylos/Romilos
1963	Treloi polyteleias	Τρελοί πολυτελείας	Lazaros
1964	O emiris ke o kakomiris	Ο εμίρης και ο κακομοίρης	Iskandar/Gerassimos Kapatos
1967	Miniskirt and Karate	Μίνι φούστα και καράτε Mini fousta ke karate	Colonel Leon Kollarios
1978	Apo pou pana gia ti havouza;	Από πού πάνε για τη χαβούζα;	Giorgos Papathanassis
1980	Thanassi, sfixe ki allo to zonari	Θανάση, σφίξε κι άλλο το ζωνάρι	Charalambos Xezoumidis
1980	A Taste of Greece	Γεύση από Ελλάδα; Gefsi apo Elada	-
