= Sapfo Notara =

Greek actress

- Born: Sapfo Chandanou c. 1907; Heraklion, Cretan State
- Died: June 11, 1985; Athens, Greece
- Occupation: Actress
- Years active: 1951–1981

Sapfo Notara (Greek: Σαπφώ Νοταρά; c. 1907 – June 11, 1985), born Sapfo Chandanou (Greek: Σαπφώ Χανδάνου), was a Greek actress, known for supporting capabilities in acting. In Greek films, she acted in comedies as an aunt or a housewife. Notara had a radio programme called I Kiria Kiriaki. One of her last theatre appearances was in the play Pornography (1981).

== Selected filmography ==
- H Lykaina (The she-wolf, 1951)
- Kyriakatiko Ksypnima (Windfall in Athens, 1954)
- H Kyra mas i mami (Our lady the midwife, 1958)
- H Kyria Dimarchos (The lady mayor, 1960)
- I Hartopaihtra (The gambing lady, 1964)
- Dimitri mou, Dimitri mou (My Dimitri, My Dimitri, 1967)
- Ah afti i gynaika mou (Oh, that wife of mine, 1967)
- Na 'tane to 13 na pefte se mas (If only we won the lottery, 1970)
- O Kyrios Pterarhos (Mr. Air Force General)
- Pornography (1981, play)
