= Marie Ney =

British actress (1895–1981)

- Born: Marie Fix; 18 July 1895; Chelsea, London, England
- Died: 11 April 1981 (aged 85); London, England
- Occupation: Actress
- Years active: 1919–1969
- Spouse: Thomas Menzies (1930–1962) (his death)

Marie Ney (18 July 1895 — 11 April 1981) was a British character actress who had an acting career spanning five decades, from 1919 to 1969, encompassing both stage and screen.

== Early life ==
Ney was born in London, and as a young child, went with her family to live in New Zealand. She began her acting career in that country, and continued it in Australia.

== Early roles ==
After several years of performing in those two countries, she moved back to her native Britain, where she acted at the Old Vic with many famous actors of the day such as Michael Redgrave and Robert Donat.

In 1930, Ney played Lady de Winter in the musical The Three Musketeers at the Theatre Royal, Drury Lane in London.

== Career: Film and stage ==
Ney's first film appearance was in Desert Gold (1919), a silent film made in Australia. She appeared in 11 films during the 1930s, including The Wandering Jew, Scrooge (1935), Brief Ecstasy (1937), Jamaica Inn (1939), and A People Eternal (1939). In 1941, Ney returned to Australia for a six-month season, appearing in the plays No Time for Comedy, Noël Coward's Private Lives, and Ladies in Retirement in Sydney and Melbourne. She appeared in the 1948 play Rain on the Just in London, and in 1959 The Last Word at the Royal Lyceum Theatre in Edinburgh.

In the 1950s, she appeared in the films Shadow of the Past (1950), Seven Days to Noon (1950), The Lavender Hill Mob (1951), Simba (1955), Yield to the Night (1956), and The Surgeon's Knife (1957).

In the 1950s, Ney had also moved into television roles, appearing in episodes of ITV's ITV Television Playhouse, ITV Play of the Week, and Armchair Theatre.

In 1960, she appeared in the Greek film Eroica, and in an episode of Maigret. Her last credited screen appearance was in the ITV Playhouse episode Remember the Germans (1969).

== Personal life ==
Ney was married to Thomas Menzies, and was active in the union Equity. She was a collector of art and books. Ney died in London in April 1981 aged 85.

== Partial filmography ==
- Desert Gold (1919)
- Escape (1930) as Grace
- Stürmisch die Nacht (1931)
- The Wandering Jew (1933) as Judith
- Home, Sweet Home (1933) as Constance Pelham
- Scrooge (1935) as Spirit of Christmas Past (uncredited)
- Brief Ecstasy (1937) as Martha Russell
- Jamaica Inn (1939) as Patience Merlyn
- Uneasy Terms (1948) as Honoria Wymering
- Conspirator (1949) as Lady Pennistone
- The Romantic Age (1949) as Miss Hallam
- Shadow of the Past (1950) as Mrs. Bentley
- Seven Days to Noon (1950) as Mrs. Willingdon
- The Lavender Hill Mob (1951) as School Headmistress (uncredited)
- Night Was Our Friend (1951) as Emily Raynor
- Simba (1955) as Mrs. Crawford
- Yield to the Night (1956) as Governor
- The Surgeon's Knife (1957) as Matron Fiske
- Our Last Spring (1960)
- West 11 (1963) as Mildred Dyce
- Witchcraft (1964) as Malvina Lanier
