= Windfall in Athens =

1954 film

- Directed by: Michael Cacoyannis
- Written by: Michael Cacoyannis
- Starring: Ellie Lambeti
- Cinematography: Alevise Orfanelli
- Release date: 11 January 1954
- Running time: 95 minutes
- Country: Greece
- Language: Greek

Windfall in Athens (Greek: Kyriakatiko xypnima, Greek: Κυριακάτικο Ξύπνημα) is a 1954 Greek comedy film directed by Michael Cacoyannis. It was entered into the 1954 Cannes Film Festival.

== Plot ==
Mina, a beautiful, care-free salesgirl for a milliner's shop, is robbed by two urchins while she is enjoying a Sunday morning swim. The lottery ticket she had in her purse ends up being bought by a charming, penniless young musician, and eventually wins the lottery. The two engage in a legal battle for the lottery money, but end up falling in love.

== Cast ==
- Ellie Lambeti as Mina Labrinou
- Dimitris Horn as Alexis Lorentzatos
- Giorgos Pappas as Pavlos Karayannis
- Tasso Kavadia as Liza Karayanni
- Margarita Papageorgiou as Irini Labrinou
- Sapfo Notara as Miss Ketty
- Theano Ioannidou
- Hrysoula Pateraki as Mrs. Labrinou
- Kiki Persi
- Thanasis Veggos
