= A Girl in Black =

- The film poster
- Directed by: Michael Cacoyannis
- Written by: Mihalis Kakogiannis (Michael Cacoyannis)
- Produced by: Hermes Film
- Starring: Ellie Lambeti; Dimitris Horn; Giorgos Foundas; Eleni Zafeiriou
- Cinematography: Walter Lassally
- Edited by: Emilios Proveleggios
- Music by: Arghyris Kounadis
- Release date: March 19, 1956
- Running time: 100 minutes
- Country: Greece
- Language: Greek

A Girl in Black (Greek: Το Κορίτσι με τα Μαύρα) is a 1956 Greek dramatic film by the Cypriot director Michael Cacoyannis starring Dimitris Horn and Ellie Lambeti. The film takes place on the Greek island of Hydra, where two Athenian visitors become entangled in local feuds after one of them falls in love with a local girl.

It was one of the first Greek films to achieve international recognition (Golden Globe award).

== Cast ==
- Ellie Lambeti as Marina
- Dimitris Horn as Pavlos
- Giorgos Foundas as Hristos
- Eleni Zafeiriou as Froso
- Stephanos Stratigos as Panagis
- Notis Peryalis as Antonis
- Anestis Vlahos as Mitsos
- Thanassis Veggos as policeman
- Nikos Fermas as Aristeidis

== Awards ==
The film was among the six Best Foreign Language Film award winners of the 14th Golden Globe Awards. It was also nominated for a Golden Palm Award at the 1956 Cannes Film Festival.
