= 4I =

4I or 4-I may refer to:

- Izair's IATA code
- Nimiq 4i, a model of Nimiq

== See also ==
- I4 (disambiguation)
