= Alice in the Navy =

1961 film

- Directed by: Alekos Sakellarios
- Starring: Aliki Vougiouklaki; Dimitris Papamichael
- Release date: 4 April 1961
- Running time: 1h 30min
- Country: Greece
- Language: Greek

Alice in the Navy (Greek: Η Αλίκη στο ναυτικό) is a 1961 Greek comedy film directed by Alekos Sakellarios.

== Cast ==
- Aliki Vougiouklaki - Alice
- Dimitris Papamichael - Kostas Degleris
- Giannis Gionakis - cadet
- Giannis Malouhos - Alkis Vranas
- Kaiti Lambropoulou - Sofia
- Despo Diamantidou - Alice's mother
- Kostas Papachristos - officer
- Lambros Konstantaras - commander
- Kostas Voutsas - cadet
- Stavros Paravas - cadet
- Giorgos Tsitsopoulos - Takis Dimitriou
- Dinos Karyris - Nikolaos Apostolou
- Margarita Athanasiou - Eirini

== Production ==
It was filmed aboard the ship Aetos D01, part of the "Wild Beasts" flotilla of the Greek Navy. Aetos was constructed during World War 2 for the United States Navy, serving as USS Slater DE-766, before being transferred to Greek service as part of the Truman Doctrine in 1951. After decommissioning from Greek service in 1991, Aetos was returned to the United States and restored. She now operates as the USS Slater Destroyer Escort Historical Museum in Albany, NY, and she is the last destroyer escort afloat in America.
