= The She-Wolf (1951 film) =

- Directed by: Maria Plyta
- Written by: Solonas Makris (short story); Maria Plyta
- Cinematography: Yiorgos Karydis
- Edited by: Iason Novak
- Music by: Giorgos Kazasoglou
- Production company: Anzervos
- Distributed by: Anzervos
- Release date: 26 March 1951
- Running time: 81 minutes
- Country: Greece
- Language: Greek

The She-Wolf (Greek: I lykaina) is a 1951 Greek romantic drama film directed by Maria Plyta and starring Aleka Katselli, Andreas Zisimatos and Anthi Miliadi.

== Cast ==
- Aleka Katselli as Louka
- Andreas Zisimatos as Alexis
- Anthi Miliadi
- Giannis Argyris as Manousos
- Inta Hristinaki
- Dimos Starenios
- Anna Paitatzi
- Kostis Leivadeas
- Lakis Skellas
- Nina Starenjou
- Yorgos Ploutis
- Sapfo Notara as Taso
- Evangelos Gatzias
- Eleftheria Xanthopoulou
- Evangelos Maroulis
- Apostolos Galanopoulos
- Nitza Avantagelou
- Asimina Bairamoglou
- Kostas Doukas
- Ilias Iakovou
- Alexandros Kokkinos
- Pari Kontarini
- Konstadinos Mourat
- Nasos Oikonomopoulos
- Fotis Papalabros
- Yiorgos Stavrakakis
- Malvina Tsougiopoulou
- Antonis Tsourounakis
- Kiki Vasilikou
- Nana Viopoulou
- Dimitris Vlahopoulos
- Olga Xanthopoulou

== Bibliography ==
- Vrasidas Karalis. A History of Greek Cinema. A&C Black, 2012.
