= Sweet Country (1987 film) =

1987 film by Michael Cacoyannis

- Directed by: Michael Cacoyannis
- Written by: Michael Cacoyannis
- Starring: Jane Alexander
- Cinematography: Andreas Bellis
- Edited by: Michael Cacoyannis; Dínos Katsourídis
- Music by: Stavros Xarchakos
- Release date: 1987
- Language: English

Sweet Country is a 1987 American drama film written and directed by Michael Cacoyannis and starring Jane Alexander.

It is based on the 1979 semi-autobiographical novel of the same name by Caroline Richards and it is set in Chile during the military takeover of 1973.

== Cast ==
- Jane Alexander as Anna
- John Cullum as Ben
- Franco Nero as Paul
- Carole Laure as Eva
- Joanna Pettet as Monica
- Randy Quaid as Juan
- Irene Papas as Mrs. Araya
- Jean-Pierre Aumont as Mr. Araya
- Pierre Vaneck as Father Venegas
