= Filopimin Finos =

Greek film producer

Philopemen Finos
- Born: 1 September 1908; Kato Tithorea, Amfikleia-Elateia, Phthiotis
- Died: January 26, 1977 (aged 68); Athens
- Occupation(s): Film director, actor
- Years active: 1939–1977
- Spouse: Linda Finou (1939–1977)

Philopemen Finos (Greek: Φιλοποίμην Φίνος; 1 September 1908– January 26, 1977) was a Greek film producer of 186 films and the founder of Finos Film, whose first film was in 1939. He built the first sound recording device in Greece, and shot the first colour film with stereo sound. Finos died in January 1977 after suffering cancer for seven years and he left no heir.

== Selected filmography ==
- The Parting Song (1939)
- The Voice of the Heart (1943)
