= About the Thunders =

1946 Greek animated film

- Σιγά τους Κεραυνούς
- Directed by: Pavlos Valasakis
- Screenplay by: Pavlos Valasakis
- Produced by: Giannis Rousopoulos Giorgos Rousopoulos
- Release date: 1946 (Athens)
- Running time: 5'
- Country: Greece
- Language: Greek (silent film)

"About the Thunders" (Greek: Σιγά τους Κεραυνούς) is a Greek short animated film from 1946. The film shows the actions and conflicts of the Olympian Gods (mainly Hera and Zeus) in a comical way. The premiere of the movie took place at the "Cineak" Cinema, in Athens, but there was no success in selling tickets, due to the Greek Civil War. It is the second animated film produced in Greece.

The entire film is not available on the internet, but only a few photos.

The commercial failure of the film discouraged not only its directors, but also other prospective animation creators in Greece.

== See also ==
- Twelve Olympians
