= I-4: Loafing and Camouflage =

I-4:Loafing and Camouflage
- Directed by: Vassilis Katsikis
- Written by: Vassilis Katsikis
- Starring: Giorgos Kimoulis; Thanasis Tsaltabasis; Haris Mavroudis; Petros Lagoutis; Kostas Fragolias; Stathis Panagiotidis; Maria Korinthiou; Isavela Kogevina
- Release date: 27 April 2008
- Country: Greece
- Language: Greek
- Box office: $4,580,564

I-4: Loafing and Camouflage or I-4: Loafing and Exemption (Greek: I-4:Λούφα και Απαλλαγή/I-4:Loufa kai Apallagi) is a 2008 Greek comedy film written and directed by Vassilis Katsikis. The film was one of the highest-grossing Greek films of its release year.

== Plot ==
Five young men try to be exempted from the army using their high social interfaces. But a scandal related with many exemptions from the army breaks out and the five men are compelled to enlist. Finally they enlist in category I-4 that means they serve as unarmed. Next they go to serve as auxiliary unit in commando troops. There, the soldiers are forced to face the cruel behaviour of commandos. But, in this camp the Greek colonel plays an army role play game with the Turkish colonel of the Turkish camp, in the other coast of Aegean. This game gives to the I-4 soldiers the opportunity to avenge the commandos. Finally the conflict between commandos and I-4 upset the camp, but the I-4 soldiers manage to avoid the penalties.

== Cast ==
- Giorgos Kimoulis as Colonel Theofilos Theofilou
- Thanasis Tsaltabasis as Thanasis Kioubasidis
- Haris Mavroudis as Alkis Koumentakis
- Petros Lagoutis as Miltos Mavreas
- Kostas Fragolias as Alexandros Galatis
- Stathis Panagiotidis as Theo Foutidis
- Maria Korinthiou as Eleni Theofilou
- Isavela Kogevina as Maria Theofilou
