= Michalis Nikolinakos =

Greek theatrical and cinematic actor

Michalis Nikolakos Μιχάλης Νικολινάκος
- Born: 1923; Alyka in the Laconia prefecture, Kingdom of Greece
- Died: December 13, 1994 (aged 70–71); Athens, Greece
- Occupation: actor

Michalis Nikolakos or Mihalis Nikolakkos (Greek: Μιχάλης Νικολινάκος, 1923 – 13 December 1994) was a Greek theatrical and cinematic actor. He was born in 1923 in Alyka, Laconia, in the southeastern Peloponnese. In his childhood years, he moved to Piraeus. After 1946, he studied both at the art school and the drama school of the Athens Odeum, where he was a student, the great Dimitris Rontiris. He was very famous as a cartoon artist as well, with works in magazines. He died in Athens in 1994.

== Filmography ==
Year	Title	Greek title	English title	Role	Notes
1952	To stravoxylo			Kostas Panagiotou	
1953	O kapetan Sorokadas				
1953	O genitsaros	Ο γενίτσαρος	The Janissary	Michel Nichol	
1956	Tsiganiko aima				
1957	Agioupa, to koritsi tou kampou			Doctor	
1958	O anthropos tou trainou	Ο άνθρωπος του τραίνου	The Man From The Train	Yorgos Pavlidis / Yorgos Depodes	
1958	To teleftaio psema	Το τελευταίο ψέμα	A Matter of Dignity	Galanos (Γαλανός)	
1959	Egklima sto Kolonaki	Έγκλημα στο Κολωνάκι		Nasos Karnezis (Nάσος Καρνέζης)	
1959	Psit... koritsia!			Alekos	
1959	O Ali Pasa kai i kyra - Frosyni	Ο Αλή Πασάς και η κυρα- Φροσύνη		Muhtar	
1959	Gia to psomi kai ton erota	Για το ψωμί και τον έρωτα	For The Bread And Romance		
1960	Eroika				
1960	Enas Ellinas sto Parisi				
1960	Stratiotes dichos stoli	Στρατιώτες δίχως στολή		Hristos	
1960	To mystiko tou kokkinou mandya			Hristos Pallas	
1960	O xenos tis nyhtas				
1960	I Nancy (Nansy) tin psonise	Η Νάνσυ την ψώνισε	Nancy Yelled	Vassilis Komporozos	
1960	I kritikopoula kai o eleftherotis				
1960	Ena koritsi se perimenei				
1961	Efialtis	Εφιάλτης	Ephialtes	Tonis Karzis	
1961	Epikindyni apostoli				
1962	Oi 300 Spartiates	Οι 300 Σπαρτιάτες	The 300 Spartans	Myron	
1966	Mia gynaika katigoreitai			Giorgos Mavrospathis	
1968	Brosta stin aghoni			Grigoris	
