= Mary Aroni =

Greek actress

- Born: Maria Arvanitaki; December 1916; Athens, Greece
- Died: July 16, 1992 (aged 75); Athens, Greece
- Occupation: actress
- Years active: 1935-1992
- Spouse: Theodoros Aronis

Mary Aroni (Greek: Μαίρη Αρώνη) was a famous Greek actress. She was born in 1916 in Athens, Greece. She first appeared in theatre in 1935 and she mainly acted in theatre. She made only four cinema appearances in her acting life. She lived in Kalamaki, near Athens and she played in cinema together with Dionysis Papagiannopoulos and Lambros Konstantaras.
