= The Voice of the Heart (1943 film) =

1943 film

- Directed by: Dimitris Ioannopoulos
- Written by: Dimitris Ioannopoulos
- Produced by: Filopoimin Finos; Giorgos Kavoukidis; Angelo John Metas; Caroline Metas
- Starring: Aimilios Veakis; Dimitris Horn; Ketty Panou
- Cinematography: Prodromos Meravidis
- Music by: Christos Cheropoulos
- Production companies: Fika Films; Finos Films
- Release date: 29 April 1943
- Running time: 79 minutes
- Country: Greece
- Language: Greek

The Voice of the Heart (Greek: Η φωνή της καρδιάς) is a 1943 Greek drama film directed by Dimitris Ioannopoulos and starring Aimilios Veakis, Dimitris Horn and Ketty Panou. It was one of only of a handful of Greek films produced during the Occupation of Greece during the Second World War. Location shooting took place around Kifissia in Athens. It enjoyed great success with audiences and critics.

== Synopsis ==
After many years in prison a man returns to his old house, hoping to meet the daughter he has never known while she has been growing up.

== Cast ==
- Aimilios Veakis as Spyros
- Dimitris Horn as Petros
- Ketty Panou as Lila
- Labros Konstadaras as Tzortzis
- Alekos Livaditis as Alexis
- Nitsa Tsaganea as Stella
- Pantelis Zervos
- Nikos Matthaios
- Smaroula Giouli
- Vana Filippidou
- Stelios Vokovich
- Sotiria Iatridou
- Smaro Veaki
- Giannis Kondoulis
- Eleni Halkousi
- Vana Theohary

== Bibliography ==
- Karalis, Vrasidas . A History of Greek Cinema. A&C Black, 2012.
- Winkel, Roel Vande & Welch, David (ed.) Cinema and the Swastika: The International Expansion of Third Reich Cinema. Palgrave MacMillan, 2011.
