= My Daughter, the Socialist =

- Directed by: Alekos Sakellarios
- Starring: Aliki Vougiouklaki; Dimitris Papamichael
- Edited by: Dinos Katsouridis
- Music by: Giorgos Zambetas
- Release date: 1966
- Running time: 1h 34min
- Country: Greece
- Language: Greek

My Daughter, the Socialist (Greek: Η κόρη μου η σοσιαλίστρια) is a 1966 Greek comedy film directed by Alekos Sakellarios.

== Cast ==
- Aliki Vougiouklaki - Liza Delvi
- Dimitris Papamichael - Giorgos Nikolaidis
- Stavros Xenidis - Spyros Lozantos
- Lambros Konstantaras - Antonis Delvis
- Nikitas Platis - Dimitris Dimitriou
- Petros Lohaitis - Petros Darakis
- Chronis Exarhakos - police captain
- Nikos Tsoukas - Vlasis
- Dinos Karydis - factory worker
- Alekos Sakellarios - workers' federation representative
