= Michael Cacoyannis =

Greek-Cypriot filmmaker and playwright (1921–2011)

- Μιχάλης Κακογιάννης
- Born: 11 June 1921; Limassol, British Cyprus
- Died: 25 July 2011 (aged 90); Evangelismos Hospital, Athens, Greece
- Resting place: Michael Cacoyannis Foundation
- Citizenship: British Cyprus (until 1938); United Kingdom (1938–1951); Greece (from 1951)
- Education: Royal Central School of Speech and Drama
- Occupations: Director; producer; screenwriter; playwright; actor; lawyer; translator
- Years active: 1941–2005
- Employers: BBC; Finos Film
- Partner: Yael Dayan (1959–1967)
- Relatives: Stella Soulioti (sister)
- Awards: Ordre des Arts et des Lettres; Order of Makarios III; Grand Prix of the Americas; Academy of Athens; Thessaloniki Film Festival (1962, 1977)
- Website: mcf.gr

Michael Cacoyannis (/kækəˈjænɪs/; Greek: Μιχάλης Κακογιάννης; 11 June 1921 – 25 July 2011) was a Cypriot and Greek filmmaker, playwright and actor. He is best known for writing, directing, producing, and editing Zorba the Greek (1964), an adaptation of Nikos Kazantzakis' novel of the same name. He also directed the 1983 Broadway revival of the musical based on the film in addition to writing, directing, designing, and translating dozens of stage play and opera productions.

Cacoyannis was nominated for five Academy Awards, more than any other Cypriot: three of the nominations were for Zorba the Greek (Best Picture, Best Director, and Best Adapted Screenplay) whilst the other two were Best Foreign Language Film nominations for Electra (1962) and Iphigenia (1977). He received many other accolades, including the Technical Grand Prize and six Palme d'Or nominations at the Cannes Film Festival.

== Early life ==
Cacoyannis was born Michalis Kakogiannis in on 11 June 1921 in Limassol, which was then part of British Cyprus. His father, Panayotis Loizou Cacoyannis, had been knighted in King Edward VIII's 1936 Birthday Honours for public services in Cyprus. His sister, Stella Soulioti, became a politician.

== Career ==
In 1939, Cacoyannis was sent to London by his father to become a lawyer; however, after graduating from law school, he joined the BBC World Service and soon took charge of its new Cyprus Service. His deputy there was Beba Clerides, sister of Glafkos Clerides, a Royal Air Force fighter pilot who later became President of Cyprus. After producing Greek-language programmes for the World Service during World War II, he enjoyed a brief stage acting career under the name Michael Yannis at The Old Vic before he began pursuing a filmmaking career. After having trouble finding a directing job in the British film industry, he moved to Athens in 1952 to instead work in the Greek film industry, where he soon made his directorial debut with Windfall in Athens (1953).

Cacoyannis' film Electra (1962) received an Academy Award nomination Best Foreign Language Film. His most notable work came when he wrote, directed, produced, and edited the film Zorba the Greek (1964), an adaptation of Nikos Kazantzakis' novel of the same name, which earned him nominations for three Academy Awards: Best Picture, Best Director, and Best Adapted Screenplay. His film Iphigenia (1977) also received an Academy Award nomination for Best Foreign Language Film, bringing his Academy Award nominations to a total of five, more than any other Cypriot. His other accolades included the Technical Grand Prize and six Palme d'Or nominations at the Cannes Film Festival. He was offered the chance to direct Elizabeth Taylor and Marlon Brando in the film Reflections in a Golden Eye (1967), but he declined and the job went to American filmmaker John Huston.

Cacoyannis translated some of William Shakespeare's plays such as Antony and Cleopatra, Coriolanus, and Hamlet into Greek, and Euripides' play The Bacchae into English. He directed the 1983 Broadway revival of the musical based on the film in addition to writing, directing, designing, and translating dozens of stage play and opera productions.

== Personal life ==
From 1959 to 1967, Cacoyannis was in a relationship with Israeli politician and author Yael Dayan, with whom he lived in Athens.

== Death ==
Cacoynnis suffered an acute coronary episode on 15 July 2011 and he was taken to Evangelismos Hospital. He died of cardiac arrest on 25 July 2011, at age 90. He was buried in the grounds of Michael Cacoyannis Foundation.

== Filmography ==
- Windfall in Athens (Kyriakatiko xypnima) (1954): director, screenwriter
- Stella (1955): director, screenwriter, producer
- A Girl in Black (To koritsi me ta mavra) (1956): director, screenwriter
- A Matter of Dignity (To telefteo psemma) (1957): director, screenwriter, producer
- Eroica (Our Last Spring) (1960): director, screenwriter, producer
- The Wastrel (Il Relitto) (1961): director, screenwriter
- Electra (1962): director, screenwriter, producer
- Zorba the Greek (Alexis Zorbas) (1964): director, screenwriter, producer
- The Day the Fish Came Out (Otan ta psaria vgikan sti steria) (1967): director, screenwriter, producer
- The Trojan Women (1971): director, screenwriter, producer
- The Story of Jacob and Joseph, director
- Attilas '74 (1975): director, producer
- Iphigenia (1977): director, screenwriter
- Sweet Country (Glykeia patrida) (1986): director, screenwriter, producer
- Up, Down and Sideways (Pano kato ke plagios) (1993): director, screenwriter, producer
- The Cherry Orchard (1999): director, screenwriter, producer

== Bibliography ==
- Cacoyiannis, Michael. Diladi. Athens: Kastaniotis, 1990.

== Awards and nominations ==
Cannes Film Festival

- 1954 : Golden Palm for "Windfall in Athens" – nominated
- 1955 : Golden Palm for "Stella" – nominated
- 1956 : Golden Palm for "A Girl in Black" – nominated
- 1957 : Golden Palm for "A Matter of Dignity" – nominated
- 1961 : Golden Palm for "The Wastrel" – nominated
- 1962 : Golden Palm for "Elektra" – nominated
- 1962 : Grand Jury Prize for "Elektra" – won
- 1962 : Technical Award for "Elektra" – won
- 1977 : Golden Palm for "Iphigenia" – nominated

Berlin International Film Festival

- 1960 : Golden Bear for "Our Last Spring" – nominated
- 1963 : David O. Selznick Award for "Elektra" – won

Academy Award (Oscar)

- 1963 : Best Foreign Language Film for "Elektra" – nominated
- 1964 : Best Picture for "Zorba the Greek" – nominated
- 1964 : Best Director for "Zorba the Greek" – nominated
- 1964 : Best Adapted Screenplay for "Zorba the Greek" – nominated
- 1977 : Best Foreign Language Film for "Iphigenia" – nominated

Golden Globe

- 1956 : Best Foreign Language Film for "Stella" – won
- 1957 : Best Foreign Language Film for "A Girl in Black" – won
- 1965 : Best Director for "Zorba the Greek – nominated

British Academy Award (BAFTA)

- 1966 : Best Film for "Zorba the Greek" – nominated
- 1966 : UN Award for "Zorba the Greek" – nominated

New York Film Critics

- 1964 : Best Film for "Zorba the Greek" – nominated
- 1964 : Best Director for "Zorba the Greek" – nominated
- 1964 : Best Screenplay for "Zorba the Greek" – nominated

David di Donatello Award

- 1964 : Special Plaque for "Zorba the Greek" – won

Thessaloniki Film Festival

- 1960 : Special Contribution Award – won
- 1961 : Best Director for "Our Last Spring" – won
- 1962 : Best Film for "Elektra" – won
- 1962 : Best Director for "Elektra" – won
- 1977 : Best Film for "Iphigenia" – won
- 1999 : Union of Film and Television Technicians Award for "The Cherry Orchard" – won

Moscow Film Festival

- 1956 : Silver Medal for "A Girl in Black" – Won

Edinburgh Film Festival

- 1954 : Diploma of Merit for "Windfall in Athens" – won
- 1962 : Diploma of Merit for "Elektra" – won

Montreal World Film Festival

- 1999 : Special Contribution Award – won

Jerusalem Film Festival

- 1999 : Lifetime Achievement Award – won

Cairo International Film Festival

- 2001 : Lifetime Achievement Award – won

== External links. ==
- Michael Cacoyannis at IMDb
- Michael Cacoyannis at the Internet Broadway Database
- Michael Cacoyannis at the Internet Off-Broadway Database (archived)
