= Attilas '74 =

Attilas '74 – The Rape of Cyprus
- Directed by: Michael Cacoyannis
- Written by: Michael Cacoyannis
- Produced by: Michael Cacoyannis
- Cinematography: Sakis Maniatis
- Edited by: Michael Cacoyannis; Vivien Sammut Smith
- Distributed by: Fox Lorber
- Release date: 1974
- Running time: 103 minutes
- Languages: English; Greek

Attilas '74: The Rape of Cyprus is a 1974 documentary film by Michael Cacoyannis about the Turkish invasion of Cyprus in 1974. It was filmed on location in Cyprus and Greece in the immediate aftermath of the two Turkish invasions and subsequent occupation of approximately the northern third of the island.

Cacoyannis chronicles the events of 1974 in Cyprus with rare interviews of President Makarios of the Republic, Nikos Sampson – the man the Greek junta imposed as leader after their attempted coup, and many Greek Cypriot victims of the Turkish invasion.

Academy Award-nominated director Cacoyannis provides insight and analysis about events leading up to the invasion, and the subsequent events and ramifications of Turkey's occupation of Cyprus. Including interviews with pro-Makarios and pro-junta supporters, this documentary also explores the anti-American and British imperialist sentiment on the island and outrage at the lack of action taken by them and the United Nations to protect Cyprus as Turkey was effectively given carte blanche to invade and occupy despite numerous United Nations Security Council resolutions demanding their withdrawal.

== See also ==
- Cinema of Greece
- Akamas (film)
