= List of 2013 box office number-one films in Greece =

This is a list of films released in Greece in 2013.

== Box office number-one films ==
This is a list of films which have placed number one at the weekend box office in Greece during 2013.

†	This implies the highest-grossing movie of the year.

Week	Date	Film	Gross	Notes
1	January 6, 2013	Life of Pi	$1,763,648	
2	January 13, 2013	Argo	$1,316,615	
3	January 20, 2013	Django Unchained	$1,282,737	
4	January 27, 2013	Django Unchained	$1,162,800	
5	February 3, 2013	Lincoln	$972,098	
6	February 10, 2013	Silver Linings Playbook	$751,829	
7	February 17, 2013	Love in the End	$1,274,629	
8	February 24, 2013	Love in the End	$794,058	
9	March 3, 2013	Argo	$652,731	
10	March 10, 2013	Oz The Great and Powerful	$562,732	
11	March 17, 2013	Akalyptos	$683,858	
12	March 24, 2013	Akalyptos	$778,401	
13	March 31, 2013	Broken City	$569,499	
14	April 7, 2013	Jack the Giant Slayer	$547,696	
15	April 14, 2013	Scary Movie 5	$542,372	
16	April 21, 2013	The Croods	$521,648	
17	April 28, 2013	Iron Man 3	$931,094	
18	May 5, 2013	Iron Man 3	$174,105	
19	May 12, 2013	Iron Man 3	$514,577	
20	May 19, 2013	The Great Gatsby	$518,819	
21	May 26, 2013	Fast & Furious 6	$910,125	
22	June 2, 2013	The Hangover Part III	$1,138,330	
23	June 9, 2013	The Hangover Part III	$867,437	
24	June 16, 2013	Before Midnight	$816,815	
25	June 23, 2013	Man of Steel	$1,069,367	
26	June 30, 2013	World War Z	$871,862	
27	July 7, 2013	The Lone Ranger	$745,334	
28	July 14, 2013	The Company You Keep	$627,115	
29	July 21, 2013	Red 2	$536,935	
30	July 28, 2013	The Wolverine	$554,254	
31	August 4, 2013	The Wolverine	$351,097	
32	August 11, 2013	The Wolverine	$264,811	
33	August 18, 2013	The Wolverine	$206,342	
34	August 25, 2013	We're the Millers	$888,451	
35	September 1, 2013	Blue Jasmine	$1,095,789	
36	September 8, 2013	The Smurfs 2	$1,368,402	
37	September 15, 2013	The Smurfs 2	$1,006,370	
38	September 22, 2013	The Smurfs 2	$883,090	
39	September 29, 2013	The Conjuring	$874,196	
40	October 6, 2013	The Conjuring	$830,731	
41	October 13, 2013	Despicable Me 2	$1,238,778	
42	October 20, 2013	Despicable Me 2	$1,020,341	
43	October 27, 2013	Captain Phillips	$1,094,876	
44	November 3, 2013	Captain Phillips	$1,026,432	
45	November 10, 2013	Gravity	$1,447,023	
46	November 17, 2013	Gravity	$1,212,934	
47	November 24, 2013	Thor: The Dark World	$1,336,235	
48	December 1, 2013	The Hunger Games: Catching Fire	$975,453	
49	December 8, 2013	Little England	$1,190,114	
50	December 15, 2013	The Hobbit: The Desolation of Smaug †	$2,040,998	
51	December 22, 2013	The Hobbit: The Desolation of Smaug †	$1,615,896	
52	December 29, 2013	Frozen	$2,457,103	

== Highest-grossing films ==
The top ten 2013 released films in Greece are as follows:

Highest-grossing films of 2013
Rank	Title	Distributor	Year round gross
1.	The Hobbit: The Desolation of Smaug	Warner Bros. / MGM / New Line	$3,981,305
2.	Little England	Black Orange / Ote TV	$2,836,936
3.	Gravity	Warner Bros. / Legendary	$2,353,711
4.	Iron Man 3	Marvel	$2,049,858
5.	The Smurfs 2	Columbia Pictures / Sony Pictures Animation	$1,997,836
6.	Despicable Me 2	Universal / Illumination	$1,825,257
7.	Frozen	Disney	$1,808,633
8.	The Hangover Part III	Warner Bros.	$1,728,999
9.	Argo	Warner Bros.	$1,465,751
10.	Blue Jasmine	Odeon	$1,439,152

== See also ==
- List of Greek films - Greek films by year
- Cinema of Greece
