= Dimitris Konstantaras =

Greek politician (1946–2025)

- Δημήτρης Κωνσταντάρας

Member of the Hellenic Parliament for Athens A
- In office 7 March 2004 – 18 August 2007

Personal details
- Born: 9 October 1946; Athens, Kingdom of Greece
- Died: 24 August 2025 (aged 78); Athens, Greece
- Political party: ND; LAOS
- Spouse: Viki Vourlaki
- Relations: Lambros Konstantaras (father)
- Children: 2
- Education: National and Kapodistrian University of Athens
- Occupation: Journalist

Dimitris Konstantaras (Greek: Δημήτρης Κωνσταντάρας; 9 October 1946 – 24 August 2025) was a Greek politician. A member of New Democracy and the Popular Orthodox Rally, he served in the Hellenic Parliament from 2004 to 2007. He was the son of actor Lambros Konstantaras.

Konstantaras died in Athens on 24 August 2025, at the age of 78.
