= Zozo Zarpa =

Greek actress

Zozo Zarpa (Ζωζώ Ζάρπα) (1939 – 19 April 2012) was a Greek television, film and stage actress.

Zarpa studied at the National Theatre of Greece Drama School. She began her acting career by performing on stage in Ancient Greek dramatic plays. In addition to her long film and theater credits, Zarpa founded the Themelion theatre, and co-founded a Greek drama school with her Elda Dimopoulos (her sister) and Yannis Negrapontis.

She achieved a degree of fame in the United States in 2010 and 2011, when she appeared in a television commercial campaign for Kraft Foods' Athenos brand of hummus and Greek yogurt. The ad campaign developed by Droga5, which was the first ever for the Athenos brand, featured the tagline, "Approved by Yiayia." The commercials were shot and cast in Greece, leading Zarpa's role as one of the Yiayias, or Greek grandmothers. In Zarpa's commercial, her Yiayia character asks a young, cohabiting couple if they were married. When the couple says no, Yiayia immediately tells them that they are going to hell. The spot earned Zarpa new fans throughout the United States and Greece. As of 2012, her Athenos commercial had received more than 1,200,000 hits on YouTube.

== Death ==
Zarpa died from a heart attack on 19 April 2012, aged 73, and was interred in a cemetery in Chalandri, Attica, the following day.
