= 100,000 Pounds =

Ekato hiliades lires 100,000 Pounds Εκατό χιλιάδες λίρες
- Directed by: Alekos Leivaditis
- Written by: Nikos Tsiforos
- Starring: Mimis Fotopoulos; Dinos Iliopoulos; Kaiti Panou; Alekos Leivaditis; Giorgos Damasiotis; Tzeny Stavropoulou; Giannis Ioannidis; Andreas Mitakis; Soula Emanouil; Filos Filippidis
- Music by: Menelaos Theofanidis
- Production company: Mer Film
- Release date: 1948
- Running time: 79 minutes
- Country: Greece
- Language: Greek

100,000 Pounds (Greek: Εκατό χιλιάδες λίρες, romanized: Ekato hiliades lires) is a 1948 Greek film directed by Alekos Leivaditis and starring Mimis Fotopoulos, Dinos Iliopoulos, and Kaiti Panou. The film was produced by Mer Film.

The film is directed by Alekos Leivadiris (an actor and a director in theatre and film) with operator (photographer) Prodromos Meravidis and writer Nikos Tsiforos. The music was composed by Menelaos Theofanidis.

Before the movie was released to the screen, it had two working titles: 100,000 Pounds and Gabri me dossis.

== Cast ==
- Mimis Fotopoulos ..... Kleomenis
- Dinos Iliopoulos ..... Chronis
- Kaiti Panou ..... Pagona Katife
- Alekos Leivaditis ..... Frixos Delapis
- Giorgos Damasiotis ..... Dionysis Katifes
- Tzeny Stavropoulou
- Giannis Ioannidis
- Andreas Mitakis
- Soula Emanouil
- Filios Filippidis ..... Agop
