= Ellie Lambeti =

Greek actress (1926–1983)

- Έλλη Λαμπέτη
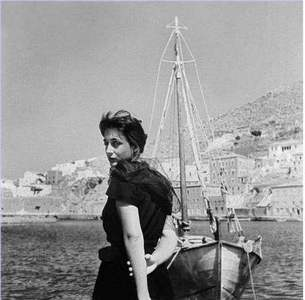
- Born: Ellie Loukou; 13 April 1926
- Died: 2 September 1983 (aged 57); New York City, New York

Ellie Loukou (Greek: Έλλη Λούκου; 13 April 1926 – 3 September 1983), known professionally as Ellie Lambeti (Greek: Έλλη Λαμπέτη), was a Greek actress.

== Family ==
Lambeti was born in 1926 in the village of Vilia, Attiki, to Kostas Loukos and Anastasia Stamati. She had six siblings. Her maternal grandfather was a Captain Stamatis who fought together with Kolokotronis in the Greek War of Independence, when the modern Greek democracy was created. In 1928, the family moved to Athens.

During the Greco-Italian War, she moved to the big neoclassical style house on Delphon and Didotou street where she had been living all her life. During the Dekemvriana in December 1944, her mother, who was in the house at the time, was killed by a loose shot fired amidst the battle. This took a significant psychological toll on Lambeti, lasting well into her adult life.

== Early career ==
Ellie studied theatre at Marika Kotopouli's drama school. She made her first steps on the stage at the time of German occupation of Greece. She passed this difficult period as all her theatre colleges. In 1941, she was rejected from two theatre schools: the state one (Ethniko) and a private one named for the Greek actress Marika Kotopouli. However, Kotopouli herself recognized Lambeti's talent and hired her. She adopted the professional surname Lambeti and became a lead actress. She starred in Hanneles Himmelfahrt by Gerhart Hauptmann. In 1945, she met Marios Ploritis, her future husband, during the filming one of her first films, Adoulotoi sklavoi (1946).

In 1946 Lambeti became one of the actresses who performed for the famous modern theatre director Karolos Koun; she was the female lead in the Greek productions of the following plays:

- The Glass Menagerie by Tennessee Williams (1946)
- Antigone by Jean Anouilh (1947)
- Bodas de sangre by Federico García Lorca (1948)

== 1950s/1960s ==
In August 1950, she married Marios Ploritis, but their marriage collapsed in 1952 when she had a love affair with Dimitris Horn. Together they produced and played in theatre in Libelei in 1953, in La Cuisine des Anges in 1953, in L'Invitation au Château in 1955, in Quality Street in 1956, in The Rainmaker by Richard Nash in 1956, in Gigi in 1957, in The Fourposter in 1957, in Two for the Seesaw by William Gibson in 1958 and in 1959 in Dans sa Candeur Naive. The following years were dramatic for Ellie: her sister Koula died from cancer in 1955, her other sister Eirini died in a car crash in 1958, and Ellie lost a baby by Horn in 1956. In 1959 she met her American husband, the best-selling novelist Frederic Wakeman, Sr. She starred in Michael Cacoyannis's Greek masterpieces like Kyriakatiko xypnima (1954), To Koritsi me ta mavra (1956), and To Telefteo psema (1957). For her performance in the latter film, she received a nomination for Best Foreign Actress at the 1960 British Academy Film Awards. She also starred in Kalpiki lira (1955) by George Tzavellas. Lambeti continued her theatrical career, in 1962 came The Heiress, in 1965 as Blanche in A Streetcar Named Desire.

== Late life and career ==
In the 1970s Lambeti starred in The Little Foxes (1973), Irma La Douce (1972), Miss Margarita (1975) and Filoumena Martourano (1978). Lampeti was involved in a legal procedure about the adoption of a girl named Eliza, from Spring 1970 till 1974, when she lost and gave the child back to her parents.

== Last years ==
The subsequent years were a fight against recurrent breast cancer. She successfully starred in theatre productions like Thornton Wilder's Hello, Dolly! (1980) and as Sarah in Mark Medoff's Children of a Lesser God (1981), but her health was poor. She died September 2, 1983 from stage 4 breast cancer in New York City, aged 57.
