= Lambros Konstantaras =

Greek actor and screenwriter (1913–1985)

- Λάμπρος Κωνσταντάρας
- Born: 13 March 1913; Kolonaki, Athens, Greece
- Died: 28 June 1985 (aged 72); Voula, Greece
- Resting place: First Cemetery of Athens
- Citizenship: Greece; France (1934–1938)
- Occupations: Actor; screenwriter; comedian; goalkeeper
- Years active: 1937–1981
- Employer: Finos Film
- Spouses: Julie Georgopoulou (m. 1945; div. 1949) Filio Kekatou (m. 1971)
- Partner: Anna Kalouta (1949–1954)
- Children: Dimitris Konstantaras
- Relatives: Mitsi Konstadara (sister)

Lambros Konstantaras (Greek: Λάμπρος Κωνσταντάρας; 13 March 1913 – 28 June 1985) was a Greek actor and screenwriter of cinema, theatre, and television. He appeared in 80 films between 1940 and 1981 and is considered as one of the best Greek comedian actors of all time.

== Biography ==
He was born on 13 March 1913, in Kolonaki, Athens. He studied acting in Paris and graduated in 1933, making his theatre debut in France in 1937. The following year, he returned to Greece and worked in theatre. After working in several theatre groups he formed his own with Jenny Karezi, Maro Kontou and Nikos Rizos, often working together with such actresses as Ellie Lambeti, Aliki Vougiouklaki and others. However, Konstantaras was far better known as a film actor, playing leading roles in more than 80 movies. In cinema, he debuted in 1939 with the film The Parting Song, the first Greek sound film. In his youth, many of his roles were of a serious nature but later on in life he played almost exclusively comic roles usually as an executive or the father of the bride, etc. He cooperated with Alekos Sakellarios in many hits of decade 1950 and 1960 such as Alice in the Navy and Yparhei kai Filotimo. In 1969, he won the best leading actor award in Thessaloniki Festival of Greek Cinema, for the film O Blofatzis, directed by Vasilis Georgiadis. Konstantaras died on 28 June 1985, at age 72, and is buried in the First Cemetery of Athens.

== Selected filmography ==
- The Parting Song (1940) as Konstantis
- The Voice of the Heart (1943) as Tzortzis
- Ragismenes kardies... (1945) as Alkis
- Prosopa lismonimena (1946) as Pavlos Kalvos
- Katadromi sto Aigaion (1946) as Capt. Alexis Komninos
- Marina (1947) as Vasos
- Anna Roditi (1948) as Aris Galanos
- Diagogi... miden! (1949) as Fotis
- Oi apahides ton Athinon (1950) as Kostas
- Ekeines pou den prepei n' agapoun... (1951) as Giorgos
- Apagogi stin Kriti (1951)
- Angelos me heiropedes (1952) as Petros
- Heaven Is Ours (1953) as Thanos Varlamos
- Oute gata oute zimia (1955) as Nikos Koutroubas
- Madame X (1955) as Stefanos Petridis
- The Lovers Arrive (1956) as Spyros Argyriou
- The Duchess of Plakendia (1956) as Karolos
- Maria Pentagiotissa (1957) as Georgios Armaos
- Syghorese me, paidi mou (1957)
- I moira grafei tin istoria (1957)
- Diakopes stin Aigina (1958) as Tzonis
- To trellokoritso (1958) as Papadopoulos
- Dyo agapes, dyo kosmoi (1958) as Costas Kosmidis
- To parastratima mias athoas (1959) as Alexis
- To agorokoritso (1959) as Father
- Taxeidi me ton erota (1959) as Labros
- Antio zoi (1960) as Stefanos Vranas
- Erotika paihnidia (1960) as Manos
- Eimai athoos (1960) as Colonel Georges Picquart
- Tyflos angelos (1960) as Kostas
- Moro mou! (1960) as Alexis Depastas
- Krouaziera sti Rodo (1960) as Petros Rambos
- Alice in the Navy (1961) as Commander
- I Liza kai i alli (1961) as Mikes Gavriiloglou
- Lathos ston erota (1961) as Antonis Mihalos
- Thriamvos (1962)
- Katigoroumenos... o eros (1962) as Ahilleas Karbantis
- Htypokardia sto thranio (1963) as Mr. Petrovasilis
- Mikroi kai megaloi en drasei (1963) as Antonis Zorbas
- O kos pterarhos (1963) as Wing Commander
- O babas mou ki ego! (1963) as Leon Mavrogiannis
- Kazanovas (1963) as Georges
- Afto to kati allo! (1963) as Nana's Father
- Tha se kano vasilissa (1964) as Pete Papatheofilopoulos
- I villa ton orgion (1964) as Haris Zavalos
- O eaftoulis mou (1964) as Giagos Angelis
- I hartopaihtra (1964) as Andreas Oikonomidis
- Epistrofi (1965) as Petros Valentis
- A Matter of Earnestness (1965) as Andreas Mavrogialouros
- Yie mou... Yie mou... (1965) as Antonis Hatziloukas
- Jenny Jenny (1966) as Miltos Kassandris
- My Daughter, the Socialist (1966) as Antonis Delvis
- I gynaika mou trellathike (1966) as Manos
- Na zi kaneis i na mi zi? (1966) as Giorgos Alexiou
- O spangorammenos (1967) as Labros Skoudris
- Dimitri mou... Dimitri mou (1967) (uncredited)
- Kati kourasmena palikaria (1967) as Dinos Diamandidis
- Viva Rena (1967) as Labros Fokas
- Patera, katse fronima... (1967) as Antonis Papastafidas
- O gerontokoros (1967) as Thanasis Baroutsos
- An oles oi gynaikes tou kosmou... (1967) as Angelis
- O striglos pou egine arnaki (1968) as Leonidas Petroheilos
- O trellos tahei 400 (1968) as Labros Labretas
- O romios ehei filotimo (1968) as Tilemahos Karadaris
- Kapetan fandis bastouni (1968) as Captain Andreas
- O blofatzis (1969) as Paraskevas Karatzovalos
- O tzanabetis (1969) as Neofytos Foteinos
- Isaia... mi horeveis (1969) as Isaias Stefanakis
- Krima... to boi sou (1970) as Marios Delipetrou
- Enas trellos glentzes (1970) as Panos Pambanos / Tikos
- Piso mou s' eho, satana (1971) as Pavlos Koundouras
- O faflatas (1971) as Dimosthenis Labroukos
- Tis zileias ta kamomata (1971) as Dimitris Karalis
- O trellopenintaris (1971) as Andreas Tependris
- Ti 30... ti 40... ti 50... (1972) as Zahos Fokianos
- O anthropos pou gyrise apo ti zesti (1972) as Loukas Bobolas
- O anthropos pou espage plaka! (1972) as Lazaros Hatziflokas
- O fantasmenos (1973) as Makis Karasinis
- Agapi mou pagovouno (1974)
- Ekeines Kai Ego (1976, TV Series)
- Treles epafes rwmeikou tupou (1978)
- O Labroukos ballader (1981) as Labros Komninos (final appearance)
