= Rena Dor =

Greek actress and singer (1917 – 2000)

Rena Dor Ρένα Ντορ
- Born: Irini Giannatou; 1917; Patras, Greece
- Died: March 5, 2000; Athens, Greece
- Occupation: actress

Rena Dor (Greek: Ρένα Ντορ; 1917 – March 5, 2000) was a Greek actress and a singer.

She was born Irini Giannatou (Ειρήνη Γιαννάτου) in Patras in 1917 and died in Athens on March 5, 2000. She is buried at Athens First Cemetery. She entered the musical theatre. Companioned her lift that she had other actors such as Alekos Leivaditis. She was orphaned from age four and had only nine sisters. She first played for her first time at 113, mainly as a dancer with Zozo Dalma in a periodical that performed in Egypt. Her first theatrical work along with Marika Krevata and Mimi Kokkini and in 1954 with Krevata, Rena Vlachopoulou. She awarded herseft the Panathinaia (Pan-Athenian awards) for her totaling her presentation in the dancing. Her last appearance was in 1978 at the Minoa theatre with N. Eleftheriou, in Ti Kostakis, ti Antdikos ta plironei o laoutzikos (Τι Κωστάκης, τι Αντρίκος, τα πληρώνει ο λαουτζίκος).

== Filmography ==
=== Film ===
Year	Film	Transliteration and translation	Role
1938	Arravon met' embodion	Αρραβών μετ' εμποδίων	-
1957	O tzitzikas ki o mermigkas	Ο τζίτζικας κι ο μέρμηγκας (The Cricket and the Ant)	-
1962	I Ellinida kai o erotas	Η Ελληνίδα και ο έρωτας	Marika
1963	Treli politelias	Τρελοί πολυτελείας	Theano

== Theater ==
Year	Film	Transliteration and translation
1935	Yfipourgos	Υφυπουργός
1945	Blue and White	Μπλε και Ασπρο (Ble ke aspro)
1954	Blue Roses	Μπλε Τριαντάφυλλα (Ble triandafila)
1959	Nychtoloulouda	Νυχτολούλουδα
1959	Edo Athinai	Εδώ Αθήναι, literally Here in Athens
1960	O Nymfaios erchetai	Ο Νυμφαίος έρχεται
1960	Ferry Boat	Φέρρυ μπωτ
1960	Glykia Athina	Γλυκιά Αθήνα (Sweet Athens)
1960	Roses For Those	Τριαντάφυλλα για σας (Triantafylla gia sas)
1961	Beethoven and Bouzouki	Μπετόβεν και μπουζούκι (Beethoven kai bouzouki)
1961	Dolce Vita in Athens	Ντόλτσε βίτα στην Αθήνα (Dolce vita stin Athina)
1966	Circus in Greece	Τσίρκο η Ελλάς (Tsirko i Ellas)
1968	Marriage of the Century	Ο γάμος του αιώνος (O gamos tou eonos)
1969	Edo tha gelasete	Εδώ θα γελάσετε
1978	Ti Kostakis, ti Antrikos, ta plironti o laoutzikos	Τι Κωστάκης, τι Αντρίκος, τα πληρώνει ο λαουτζίκος (What Kostakis, What Andrikos, For Paying The Lute Player
