= Prodromos Meravidis =

Prodromos Meravidis Πρόδρομος Μεραβίδης
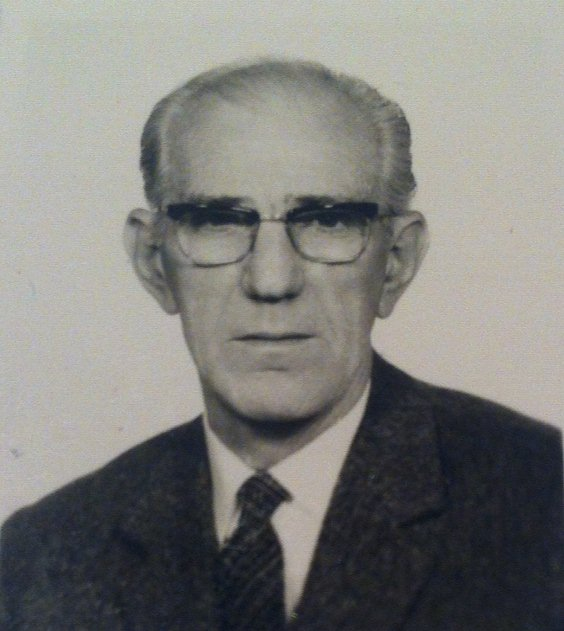
- Born: 1910; Athens
- Died: 10 August 1981 (aged 70–71); Athens
- Occupations: cinematographer, director
- Years active: 1948 - 1970

Prodromos Meravidis (Greek: Πρόδρομος Μεραβίδης, born in 1910 and died 10 August 1981) was a pioneer of Greek cinema.

== Biography ==
He shot the first Greek movie with sound and established the first color film development lab. In 1933, Meravidis filmed Volos and Pelion, while in 1936 he presented the first talkie newsreels in the Cineak theatre.

In the early 1940s, along with other photographers and filmmakers, he shot several newsreels and other short films in the front lines in Albania. From 1945 until 1950, he filmed in all of Greece using 16 cm film on behalf of the Greek War Relief Fund, which financed the reconstruction of the countryside. His short film Kos (1949–50) was the first Greek color movie.

== Selected filmography ==
=== As cinematographer ===
Year	Film title (English translation)	Original title and transliteration
1939	Better late than never	Κάλλιο αργά παρά ποτέ Kallio arga para pote
1945	The villa with the waterlilies	Η βίλλα με τα νούφαρα I villa me ta noufara
1945	Crete	Κρήτη; Kriti
1946	Tripoli-Assea	Τρίπολις- Ασέα
1956	Two Songs from Greece	Δυο Τραγούδια στην Ελλάδα; Dyo Tragoudia stin Ellada
1947	Crete in Flames	Η Κρήτη στις φλόγες I Kriti stis floges
1948	100,000 Pounds	Εκατό χιλιάδες λίρες Ekato hiliades lires
1950	Kos	Η Κως; I Kos
1951	Kidnapping in Crete	Απαγωγή στην Κρήτη; Apagogi stin Kriti
1954	Open Sea	Ανοιχτή Θάλασσα; Anihti Thalassa
1956	The Duchess of Piacenza	Η Δούκισσα της Πλακεντίας; I Doukissa tis Plakendias
1958	Kos, the Island of Hippocrates	Κως, το νησί του Ιπποκράτους; Kos, to nissi tou Ippokratous
1960	A Cruise in Rhodes	Κρουαζιέρα στη Ρόδο; Krouaziera sti Rodo
1960	You Came Late	Ήρθες αργά Irthes arga

=== As producer ===
Year	Film title (English translation)	Original title and transliteration
1945	Crete	Κρήτη; Kriti
1946	Tripoli-Assea	Τρίπολις- Ασέα
1950	Kos	Η Κως
1954	Open Sea	Ανοιχτή Θάλασσα; Anihti Thalasa

=== As director ===
Year	Film title (English translation)	Original title and transliteration
1945	Crete	Κρήτη; Kriti
1946	Tripoli-Assea	Τρίπολις- Ασέα
1950	I Kos	Η Κως

=== As editor ===
Year	Film title (English translation)	Original title and transliteration
1945	Crete	Κρήτη; Kriti
1946	Tripoli-Assea	Τρίπολις- Ασέα
1948	100,000 Pounds	Εκατό χιλιάδες λίρες
1950	I Kos	Η Κως
