= Oute gata oute zimia =

Oute gata oute zimia Ούτε γάτα ούτε ζημιά
- Directed by: Alekos Sakellarios
- Written by: Christos Giannakopoulos
- Starring: Vasilis Logothetidis; Ilya Livykou; Lampros Konstantaras; Mimis Fotopoulos; Rena Stratigou; Dina Stathatou; Charis Kamili; Margarita Lambrinou
- Music by: Giorgos Mouzakis
- Distributed by: Finos Films
- Release date: 1954
- Running time: 90 minutes
- Country: Greece
- Language: Greek

Oute gata oute zimia (Greek: Ούτε γάτα ούτε ζημιά) is a 1954 Greek black-and-white film directed by Alekos Sakellarios and Christos Giannakopoulos.

== Plot ==
Businessman Lalakis Makrykostas (Vasilis Logothetidis) is married to beautiful and much younger Popi (Ilya Livykou), who's being courted by Nikos Koutroumbas (Lampros Konstantaras). Popi is becoming suspicious of Lalakis' frequent business trips that take him away from Athens.

While Lalakis is away on yet another supposedly business trip, it is revealed by a series of coincidences that he's on a romantic getaway to Thessaloníki with his mistress. Popi decides to give him a taste of his own medicine and agrees to go on a romantic getaway of her own with Nikos. Nikos takes her to a village in Boeotia called Thymaria, where the station master Stelios Molfetas (Mimis Fotopoulos) is an old friend of Nikos'.

By coincidence, Lalakis and his mistress, Lolota (Rena Stratigou), have missed their train to Thessaloniki and are spending the night at the station master's home as well. Both illicit couples, the station master and his wife (Margarita Lamprinou), sit down to a very uncomfortable dinner; Popi pretends she's Nikos' wife, nearly convincing her own husband that she's just his wife's doppelgänger. The couples eventually retire for the night; Popi and Nikos drive back to Athens in the middle of the night, whereas Lalakis, eager to return to Athens in order to confront Popi about her infidelity, is forced to make his way back by horse and carriage and public transport.

Popi arrives home first and establishes an "alibi". Lalakis arrives shortly after her but can't prove anything. When Popi starts asking him questions about his stay in Thymaria, there's a knock on the door; it's the station master returning Lalakis' wallet, which had fallen out of his pocket the night before. The station master also mentions that Popi and Nikos also left early (the implication being that they never slept together) and that Popi left her watch behind. Lalakis, now having concrete proof of his wife's infidelity, offers to return it to her and takes it from the station master. However, instead of confronting Popi, he tells her that the jewellery shop has returned her watch. After a moment of awkwardness, they both start laughing, essentially agreeing to forget the whole thing.

== Cast ==
- Vasilis Logothetidis ..... Lalakis Makrykostas
- Mimis Fotopoulos ..... Stelios Molfetas
- Lambros Konstantaras ..... Nikos Koutroubas
- Ilia Livykou ..... Popi Makrykosta
- Rena Stratigou ..... Lolota
- Haris Kamili ..... Kiki
- Margarita Lambrinou ..... Phroso Molfeta
- Dina Stathatou ..... Tasia
- Vangelis Protopapas ..... Vangelis
- Rallis Angelidis ..... Liapis

== See also ==
- List of Greek films
- Brief Encounter
