= Smaro Stefanidou =

Greek actress (1913-2010)

- Σμάρω Στεφανίδου
- Born: 9 April 1913; Athens, Greece
- Died: 7 November 2010 (aged 97); Athens, Greece
- Occupation: Actress

Smaro Stefanidou (Greek: Σμάρω Στεφανίδου; 9 April 1913 – 7 November 2010) was a Greek theatre, film, television and radio actress.

== Biography ==
Stefanidou family originated in Asia Minor. From a very young age, she acted in plays for children. She learned foreign languages and the piano while attending business school in Athens, and worked to pay for her tuition at the National Theatre Drama School without her parents knowing, as they did not want her to become an actress. She graduated from the Drama School in 1937, after which she was hired by Marika Kotopouli. In 1952, she joined Vassilis Logothetidis's acting company, where she stayed until his death in 1960. During her career, she acted alongside Katerina, Elli Lampeti, Dimitris Horn, Lambros Konstantaras, Giannis Fertis, Xenia Kalogeropoulou, Aliki Vougiouklaki, Stefanos Lineos, Giannis Gkionakis, Nikos Kourkoulos, Antonis Antypas and many more. She played Queen Hecuba in the play Trojan Women, translated and directed by Giannis Tsarouchis and performed at a makeshift theatre on Kaplanon Street and in Delphi.

In 1951, she made her cinematic debut in The Four Steps. From there, she appeared in many movies, including adaptations of theatre plays she had performed onstage. She also worked in radio, taking part in radio serials, radio theatre and readings of novels. Her radio serials included The tongue that embroiders and Baroness Staff, and she read, in installments, A hundred years of solitude by Gabriel García Márquez, The third wreath by Kostas Tachtsis, and The decadence of the hard ones by Angelos Terzakis.

Stefanidou married singer-songwriter Vassos Seitanidis (1913–1965) and they had one daughter, Leda-Irene. Leda is a yoga teacher, Bharatanatyam dancer, choreographer, teacher, and dance therapist. In 2003, Stefanidou and Leda opened the Shantom House of Culture in Chalandri, where they hosted lessons, workshops, seminars, and performances. Stefanidou died in 2010, at the age of 97, and is buried in the First Cemetery.

== Selected works ==
=== Theatre ===
Company	Year	Play	Transliteration	Playwright	Role	Notes	Ref(s)
Kotopouli Company	1937–1940	Wedding March	Γαμήλιο Εμβατήριο; Gamilio emvatirio	Terzakis			
Kotopouli Company	1937–1940	6th floor	Έκτο πάτωμα Ékto pátoma	Gehri			
Kotopouli Company	1937–1940	Deep Are the Roots	Βαθιές είναι οι ρίζες Vathiés eínai oi rízes	d'Usseau			
Kotopouli Company	1937–1940	Mrs. Warren's Profession	Το επάγγελμα της κυρίας Γουόρεν; To epángelma tis kyrías Gouóren	Shaw			
Kotopouli Company	1937–1940	The New Life	Καινούργια ζωή Kainourgia zoi	Bogris			
Kotopouli Company	1937–1940	Everything will change	Όλα θ' αλλάξουν Όλα θ' αλλάξουν	Bogris	Mrs Asprodonti		
Kotopouli Company	1937–1940	Don Juan	Δον Ζουάν; Don Zouán	Aube			
Kotopouli Company	1937–1940	Light breeze	Το Μελτεμάκι; Meltemaki	Horn			
Kotopouli Company	1937–1940	Electra	Ηλέκτρα; Iléktra	Sophokles	Chorus leader		
Andreadi Company	1940–1942	War quadrilles	Πολεμικές καντρίλιες Polemikés kantrílies	Yalamas, Oekonomidis, and Thisvios			
Andreadi Company	1940–1942	Good faith	Ή καλή ελπίδα Í kalí elpída	Hagermann			
Andreadi Company	1940–1942	Come on the first of the month	Περάστε την πρώτη του μηνός Peráste tin próti tou minós	Békeffy			
Andreadi Company	1944	Madame Sans-Gêne		Sardou			
Andreadi Company	1944	Lady I love you	Κυρία σας αγαπώ Kyría sas agapó	Lenz			
Art Theatre	1942–1944	The Wild Duck	Η αγριόπαπια I agriópapia	Ibsen			
Art Theatre	1942–1944	Swanevit	Σουάνεβιτ; Souánevit	Strindberg			
Art Theatre	1942–1944	Konstantine and Helen	Κωνσταντίνου και Ελένης; Konstantínou kai Elénis	Sevastikoglou			
Art Theatre	1942–1944	Right You Are (if you think so)	Έτσι είναι, αν έτσι νομίζετε Étsi eínai, an étsi nomízete	Pirandello			
Art Theatre	1942–1944	For a piece of land	Για ένα κομμάτι γης Gia éna kommáti gis	Cauldwell			
Art Theatre	1942–1944	Stella Violandi	Στέλλα Βιολάντη; Stélla Violánti	Xenopoulos	Maria Violandi		
United Artists Troupe	1946	Theodora	Θεοδώρα; Theodóra	Fotiadis			
United Artists Troupe	1946	If you work, you'll eat	Αν δουλέψεις, θα φας An doulépseis, tha fas				
Manolidou-Pappas Company	1949–50						
Logothetidis Company	1952–1960	An old maid of 39	Despinis eton 39	Sakellarios and Giannakopoulos			
Logothetidis Company	1952–1960	A Pebble in the Lake	Ένα βότσαλο στη λίμνη Ena votsalo sti limni	Roussos			
Logothetidis Company	1952–1960	Tuesday and the 13th	Τρίτη και 13; Triti kai dekatris	Sakellarios and Giannakopoulos			
Logothetidis Company	1952–1960	A very stupid fellow	Ένας βλάκας και μίσος Enas vlakas kai misos	Psathas			
Logothetidis Company	1952–1960	The lovers arrive	Ο εραστής έρχεται O erastis erchetai	Tzavellas			
Logothetidis Company	1952–1960	A beating on the bottom		Feydeau			
Logothetidis Company	1952–1960	The Last Honest Man	Ο τελευταίος τίμιος O teleftaios timios	Tsiforos			
Horn Company	1960–1962	The coward and the bold	Ο δειλός κι ο τολμηρός O deilós ki o tolmirós	Allan and MacDougal			
Horn Company	1960–1962	Woe to the young	Αλοίμονο στους νέους Aloímono stous néous	Sakellarios and Giannakopoulos			
Horn Company	1960–1962	Le Voyageur sans bagage	Ταξιδιώτης χωρίς αποσκευές Taxidiótis chorís aposkevés	Anouilh			
Horn Company	1962–63	What is Zamor?	Τι είναι ο Ζαμόρ; Ti eínai o Zamór	Neveux			
Horn Company	1962–63	Girls up in the air	Κορίτσια στον αέρα Korítsia ston aéra	Camoletti			
Horn Company	1967-1984	Hit	Χιτ; Chit			Kappa Theatre	
Park Theatre	1962	Beautiful City	Όμορφη πόλη Ómorfi póli	Bost and Theodorakis			
Konstantaras Company	1962–63	Carre of Queens	Karre tis damas	Roussos		With Kyrou and Konstantaras	
Konstantaras Company	1962–63	Rain	Βροχή; Vrochí	Maugham		With Konstantaras and Kontou	
Lambeti Company	1964–65	Barefoot in the Park	Ξυπόλητοι στο πάρκο Xypólitoi sto párko	Simon			
Lambeti Company	1964–65	A Streetcar Named Desire	Λεωφορείον ο πόθος Leoforeíon o póthos	Williams			
Minoa Theatre	1965	Threepenny Youth	Μιας πεντάρας νιάτα Mias pendaras niata	Pretenteris and Yalamas	Marika	Summer season	
Amiral Theatre	1965	Threepenny Youth	Μιας πεντάρας νιάτα Mias pendaras niata	Pretenteris and Yalamas	Marika	Winter season	
Kontou-Linaios-Rizos-Stefanidou Company	1966	The Countess of the Factory	Η κόμισσα της φαβρίκας I komissa tis fabrikas	Pretenteris and Yalamas			
Gionakis-Silva-Michalopoulos-Stefanidou Company	1967	The Insatiable	Ο αχόρταγος O achórtagos	Psathas		At the Alhambra Theatre	
Gionakis-Silva-Michalopoulos-Stefanidou Company	1967	Six times per week	Έξι φορές την εβδομάδα Exi fores tin evdomada	Roussos		Summer season at the Bournelli Theatre	
Fertis-Kalogeropoulou Company	1967–1984	The Pleasure of Honesty	Η ηδονή της τιμιότητας I idoní tis timiótitas	Pirandello			
Fertis-Kalogeropoulou Company	1967–1984	Butterflies are Free	Οι πεταλούδες είναι ελεύθερες Oi petaloúdes eínai eléftheres	Gershe			
Voglis-Stefanidou company	1967–1984	Zorbas	Αλέξης Ζορμπάς; Aléxis Zormpás	Kazantzakis		Directed by Nikos Charalambous	
Vougiouklaki company	1967–1984	Julia	Τζούλια; Tzoúlia				
Vougiouklaki company	1967–1984	La Dame aux Camélias	Η κυρία με τις καμέλιες I kyría me tis kamélies	Dumas		Directed by Bolognini	
Kaplanon Street Theatre	1967–1984	The Trojan Women	Τρωάδες; Troádes	Euripides	Hecuba	Translated and directed by Tsarouchis	
Voutsas Company	1967–1984	Twenty Women and I	Είκοσι γυναίκες κι εγώ Ikosi yinekes ki ego	Dalianidis			
Kalouta Theatre	1967–1984	Eight Women	Οκτώ γυναίκες κατηγορούνται Októ gynaíkes katigoroúntai	Thomas			
Bournelli Theatre	1967–1984	The Ship of Fools	Το πλοίο των τρελών To ploío ton trelón	Gershe			
Politis - Antypas Company	1967–1984	Bonheur, impair et passe		Sagan		At the Simple Theatre	
Vandis Company	1984	Retro	Ρετρό; Retró	Galin		Broadway Theatre	

=== Films ===
Year	Film	Transliteration	Role	Ref(s)
1951	The Four Steps	Τα τέσσερα σκαλοπάτια Ta tessera skalopatia	Loukia Asprokotsyfa	
1952	The Tower of Knights	Ο πύργος των ιπποτών O pyrgos ton ippoton	Orsa Delarossa	
1953	Santa Chiquita	Σάντα Τσικίτα; Sánta Tsikíta	Mrs. Delacovia	
1954	Despoinis eton 39	Δεσποινίς ετών 39; Despinis eton 39	Chrysanthi Karantari	
1956	The Lovers Arrive	Ο ζηλιαρόγατος O ziliarogatos	Mina Moutsopoulou	
1957	The lover of all women	Ο γυναικάς O ghinaikas	Korina Frabala-Zouboulou	
1960	Three dolls and myself!	Τρεις κούκλες κι εγώ! Treis koukles ki ego	Chrysa	
1960	Madalena	Μανταλένα	Pipitsa	
1961	Woe to the Young	Αλλοίμονο στους νέους Allimono stous neous	Eleni	
1961	Voyage	Ταξίδι; Taxidi	Loula	
1961	The lovers arrive	Ο εραστής έρχεται O erastis erchetai		
1961	Lucky for me I've gone mad	Ευτυχώς τρελλάθηκα Evtyhos trellathika		
1964	My Greek Wedding	Γάμος αλά Ελληνικά; Gamos ala Ellinika	Petros' mother	
1964	Aristeidis and his Ladies	Ο Αριστείδης και τα κορίτσια του O Aristidis ke ta koritsia tou	Evdokia Delaporta	
1967	Threepenny youth	Μιας πεντάρας νιάτα Mia pendaras niata	Marika Konstandinou	
1968	The madman is the sanest of all	Ο τρελός τα 'χει 400; O trellós táchei 400	Sultana	
1973	20 Ladies and I	20 γυναίκες κι εγώ 20 yinekes ki ego	Smaro Filippou	

=== Television ===
Year	Title	Transliteration	Role	Notes	Ref(s)
1971-1973	The mister, the mistress and the mama	O kyrios, i kyria kai i mama...			
1977	Monday Theatre	To theatro tis Defteras	Edim Bilingli	Episode: "O deilos kai o tolmiros" by Dimitris Psathas	
1986	Monday Theatre	To theatro tis Defteras	Theodora	Episode: "Enas vlakas kai misos" by Dimitris Psathas	
1991	The last grandsons	Oi Telefteoi Eggonoi	Elisavet Mangou	Based on a novel by Tasos Athanasiadis	
1992-1994	All four of them were wonderful	Kai oi tesseris itan yperohes	Mirella		
?	Never lose faith				
?	Love stories			By Yannis Tziotis	
