= Ena Exypno Exypno Moutro =

A Smart Smart... Face
- Greek: Ένα Έξυπνο Έξυπνο... Μούτρο
- Directed by: Andreas Andreakaki
- Written by: Giannis Dalianidis; Nikos Tsiforos
- Starring: Vassilis Avlonitis; Kostas Voutsas; Nikos Rizos; Nini Janet; Elsa Rizou; Alekos Tzanetakos; Nana Skiada; Eleni Kriti
- Distributed by: Finos Films
- Release date: 18 February 1965
- Country: Greece
- Language: Greek

Ena Exypno Exypno... Moutro (Greek: Ένα Έξυπνο Έξυπνο... Μούτρο), (English translation, "A Smart Smart... Face" also known as O Achtypitos (Greek: Ο Αχτύπητος) is a 1965 Greek black and white comedy film made by Finos Films and based on a theatrical play by Tsiforos O Tilemahos Triposse (Ο Τηλέμαχος Τρύπωσε). It was directed by Andreas Andreakis, written by Giannis Dalianidis and Nikos Tsiforos.

The movie premiered on February 18, 1965 and made about 300,000 tickets in its first run.

== Cast ==
- Vassilis Avlonitis .... Potis
- Kostas Voutsas .... Mahos
- Nikos Rizos .... Iordanis
- Nini Janet .... Nana
- Elsa Rizou .... Toula
- Alekos Tzanetakos .... Paschalis
- Nana Skiada .... Amalia
- Eleni Kriti .... Mina
- Athinodoros Proussalis .... Babis Kantourakis
- Kostas Fyssoun .... Vasos

== See also ==
- List of Greek films
