= Lemos Theater =

The Lemos Theatrical Company was a theatrical company formed in 1944. It is named after the actor Adamantios Lemos.

== The founding of Thiasos Lemos ==
On June 14, 1944, Adamantios Lemos and Mary Giatra Lemou founded the Lemos Theatrical Company. Lemos was still with the armed forces in the Middle East when he was in exile and was unable to have a theatrical company that has his own name, the theatrical company was actually known as Mairi Lemou Company. (In June 1944, Maria Giatra Lemou resigned from the Armed Forces Recreational Council and ran as a main company in which Adamantios Lemos acted and directed 23 works.

The beginning of the presentation on June 14, in the Amusement Park summer theater in Alexandria and several times in the cities of Cairo (at Esvekia and Lycée Français), Masura, Zayazik, Kafr el-Zayat, Suez, Port Said which was planned in the Metropolitan winter theatre and at Moasat in Alexandria:

23 works that were played in 302 performances were:

- Ladislas Fodor
- Charles Marais
- The Falcon by Francis de Croizier
- Seat 47 by Louis Bernouilles
- Georges Tourner
- Pierre Wolf
- Paul Geraldi
- Émile Zole
- Erotic Adventures by de Fler and Cavialler
- Dario Nikodemi
- Arnold and Bach
- Brue
- Anna Christie by Eugene O'Neill
- Anton Chekhov
- And in Greek:
- Ta arravoniasmata (Τ' αρραβωνιάσματα) and Bourini (Μπουρίνι) by Dimitris Bogris
- To Fidanaki (Το Φιντανάκι) by Pantelis Horn and Dimitris Bogri
- That's What I Am (Αυτός είμαι = Aftos ime) by Th. Sinodinou
- O Pirasmos (Ο Πειρασμός) by Grigorios Xenopoulos
- Na zi to Mesolongi (Να ζει το Μεσολόγγι = Long Live Messolongi) by Vassilis Rotas

=== Actors at Mairi Lemou Theatrical Company ===
- Mairi Giatra Lemou
- Adamantios Lemos
- Giorgos Politis
- Kostas Magis
- Alekos Kalogiannis
- Yiannis Nikolaidis
- Kiki Persi
- Labis Mashalidis
- Fofo Paschalidou
- Kostas Kostantiou
- M. Cernovic (Sternos)
- Keti Voutsaki
- Giorgos Iordanidis
- Mary Karmina
- Rita Thersi, Stavros Dinou
- Em. Emmanouil
- D. Stavridakis

From January until August 1945, the Mary Lemou Theatrical Company practiced acts in Egyptian cities including Mansura, Zayazik, Tada, Port Said, Suex, Karfer Zayat and returned to Alexandria where it gave its last farewell presentations at the Metropolitan Theatre on Wednesday, August 8, 1945.

Adamantios Lemos returned to Greece from Egypt in the summer of 1947 and made the Lemos Theatrical Company and began the presentations at the Palladio Theatre in Kallithea with the scope of discovery and searchlight on new postwar theatrical strengths.

Later at the Palladio with planned luck, Lemos indicated a property north of the central Thisseos Avenue in Kallithea in which the person that showed the conversion in which some of his works with his equipment with Lemos' costs. The symphony did the extinguishing in which many became works and were around 20% above in uncleaned receipts. Lemos put his economy which he took and a paid amount from the Working Fund.

May–September 1949 (summer period) - The theatrical company for the second time at Dionyssia Theatre in Kallithea. He began with the first presented work of Sotiris Patatzis and presented in several first presented works:

Konta sto Theo (Κοντά στο Θεό = Closer to God) by Rois Varoussiadou

- Enas apo emas (Ένας από εμάς = One From Us) by Gerassimos Stavros
- To Fioro tou Levante (Το Φιόρο του Λεβάντε = Levante's Fioro) by Grigoris Xenopoulos
- To klidi tis eftyhias (Το Κλειδί της Ευτυχίας = The Key of Luck) by Pavlina Petrovatou
- To Meltemaki (Το Μελτεμάκι) by Pantelis Horn
- Apagogi tis Smaragdos (Απαγωγή της Σμαράγδος) by Mihalis Kounelakis
- Tatanik Vals by Th. Musatesko
- Kiss Me by Tristan Bernard
- Dario Nicodemi
- Florence Barclay

The third year of Lemos Theatrical Company in Kallithea was one of the efficient and optimistic, the reason that was between the abundant manuscripts that were clearly seen from everywhere, from six of his works that were lately received by Lemos for his current summer period of 1949, it had several theatrical sources. First was one from Sotiris Patatazis. It was later named after the theatrical actor Adamantios Lemos.

May–September 1950 (Summer period): at the Dionyssia Theatre in Kallithea, Lemos continued to present Greek works by new writers, it even had the discovery of Iakovos Kambanellis with the work: Horos pano sta stahia.

Works included:

- I Theatrini (Οι Θεατρίνοι) - Alekos Galanois, director: Karolos Coon:
- To Makrino Tragoudi (Το Μακρινό Τραγούδι = A Long Song) by Manthos Ketsis
- O Kir. Sofoklis politevete (Ο Κυρ. Σοφοκλής πολιτεύεται = Mr. Sofoklis Runs)
- Idiorrithmi siziyi (Ιδιόρρυθμοι σύζυγοι) by Minas Petridis
- Mayiki Ravdos (Μαγική Ράβδος) by G. Koundouris

Actors:

- Adamantios Lemos
- Maria Giatra Lemou
- Maria Giatra Lemou
- Maria Giannakopoulou
- Nikos Efthymiou
- Alexis Damianos
- Stavros Xenidis
- Eva Evangelidou
- Eleni Stragala
- Vikros Pavlatos
- Maroula Rota
- Rena Margari
- Rika Galani
- Julia Bouka
- Dimitris Kalivokas
- Artemis Matsas
- Margarita Yeraldou
- Kostas Dimitriou
- Floros Stratos
- Giorgos Kambanellis
- Giorgos Koundouris
- Giorgos Theodossiadis

In 1951, Lemos toured his theatrical company. The absence of the first run informatical presentation of the theatrical company in Kallithea had made it to all of Greece by the Press and the radio. Truly in the dramatology were included and the recent lucks of the theatricals with the first-presented writers:

- Sotiris Patatzis
- I Theatrini (Οι θεατρίνοι) and To party tou Polyniki (Το πάρτυ του Πολυνείκη = Polynice's? Party) by Alekos Galanos
- Nyftiako tragoudi (Νυφιάτικο τραγούδι) by Notis Pergialis
- Enas apo mas (Ένας από μας = One Of Us) by Gerassimos Stavros and ten other works by the repertory,

St. Hrysos in the newspaper Ellinikos Voras April 1, 1951 wrote: The Lemos Theatrical Company is the best which recently opened in Thessaloniki. In "Nyftiako tragoudi", Lemos passed Veakis and functioned one strong Bali job, which not only touched otherwise he brings many practices and education that are used for the working of that role.

== Visits of Lemos Theatrical Company in Egypt and Sudan ==
Between October 1952 and April 1953 (winter season in Egypt and Sudan), it started in Alexandria. It premiered on October 24 at the Casablanca Theatre with the work of Tristan Bernard and included 12 works from the repertory.

== Adamantios Lemos in "Piraean Council" in Piraeus ==
November 1953 – April 1954 (winter season): The theatrical company performed at Peraikou Sindesmou Theatre. It began on November 18. Its works included"

- Maurice Brandel and Anita Hart
- Eftheia ke Tethlasmeni (Ευθεία και Τεθλασμένη) by D. Psatha and G. Roussou
- Otto Schwartz
- O Giorgaras (Aftos Eimai) (Ο Γιωργάρας (Αυτός Είμαι)) by Th. Sinadinou
- Ladislaus Fodos
- T' Arravoniasmata (Τ’ Αρραβωνιάσματα) by D. Bogria
- Mia kiria Atihisassa (Μια κυρία Ατυχήσασσα) by Sakellariou-Giannakopoulou
- Apagori tis Smaragdos (Απαγωγή της Σμαράγδος) by M. Kounelaki
- Dario Nicodemi
- Charles DeVinois A total of 15 works.

Actors and actresses:

- Adamantios Lemos
- Mary Giatra Lemou
- Giorgos Loukakis
- Spyros Konstantopoulos
- G. Tsitsopoulos
- Thanassis Kedrakas
- Spyros Kalogirou
- Tassos Politopoulos
- Lambros Kotsiris
- Spyros Papafrantzis
- Th. Aronis
- Hr. Anastasiadis
- Kostas Korassidis
- Chr. Nazos
- G. Pappas
- Ida Christinaki
- Evi Pollu
- Yiania Olymbiou
- Sapfo Notara
- Ekali Sokkou
- Lola Filippidou
- Lia Samiotaki
- Katia Athanassiou
- Chr. Karali
- Ourania Ioannou

== October 1954 – April 1955 (winter period) at Peiraikos Syndesmou Theatre ==
- Nyftiako Tragoudi (Νυφιάτικο Τραγούδι) by N Pergiali
- Tristan Bernard
- O Babas Ekpedevete (Ο Μπαμπάς Εκπαιδεύεται) by Spyros Melas
- De Fler and Callaver
- Arnold and Bach
- O Agapidikos tis Voskopoulas (Ο Αγαπητικός της Βοσκοπούλας) by D. Koromilas
- I Kassiani by Dimitris Giannoukakis
- Jean De Letrages
- T'Arravoniasmata (Τ’ Αρραβωνιάσματα) by D. Bogris

=== Actors and actresses ===
- Adamantios Lemos
- Maria Giatra-Lemou
- Kostas Rigopoulos
- Sapfo Notara
- Giorgos Loukakis
- Nikos Efthymiou
- Spyros Kostantopoulos
- Nassos Kerdakas
- Tassos Politopoulos
- Spyros Kalogyrou
- Efy Polly
- Yianna Olymbiou
- Ekali Sokou
- Marika Anthopoulou
- Lola Filippidou
- Thodoris Triandafillidis
- Ida Christinaki
- Spyros Papafrantzis
- Labros Kotsiris
- Kostas Korassidis
- Keti Chronopoulou
- Christos Anastasiadis
- Thanos Aronis
- Lia Samiotaki
- Ch. Nazos
- Christina Karali
- Mirka Raizi
- K. Athanasiou
- M. Athanasiou
- Ourania Ioannou

October 1955 – April 1956 (winter period) at Peiraikou Syndesmou Theatre

- I limni ton Dollarion ( λίμνη των Δολαρίων = Dollar Lake) by D. Tzefroni
- Otto Schwartz
- O Fataoulas (Ο Φαταούλας)
- Charles Nevinois

May–September 1955 (summer period) presented the comedy actor, D. Koromilas O Agapitikos tis Voskopoulas in a folk style celebration with 8,000 people and was sold out at the ancient theater in Argos with the council of the Greek Folk Dance And Singing Company by Dora Stratou.
