= The Lovers Arrive =

O ziliarogatos
- Directed by: Giorgos Tzavellas
- Written by: Giorgos Tzavellas
- Starring: Vassilis Logothetidis; Ilya Livykou; Vangelis Protopappas; Smaro Stefanidou; Lambros Konstantaras; Kaiti Lambropoulou; Kyveli Theochari; Nikos Rizos; Taigeti
- Distributed by: Anzervos
- Release date: 1956
- Running time: 104 minute
- Country: Greece
- Language: Greek

The Lovers Arrive (Greek: Ο Ζηλιαρόγατος) is a 1956 Greek black and white comedy film made by Anzervos and based on a theatrical play O erastis erhete (Ο εραστής έρχεται) by Georgios Roussos. It was directed and written by Giorgos Tzavellas.

== Plot ==
Mina arrives from Patras to visit her cousin Lela. On their way to Lela's house, Lela confesses that her husband, Potis, is totally focused on his work and doesn't pay much attention to her or their marriage. Mina advises Lela to make Potis jealous by pretending she's having an affair with someone called Pipis (a diminutive of Spyros [or Spyrus]). At first, Potis is oblivious to Lela's attempts to make him jealous but, after a chat with his friend Markos who has just discovered his own wife has been unfaithful, he gets suspicious and tries to find out who "Pipis" is. A number of coincidences make a neighbour, Spyros, seem like the obvious "candidate". Potis tells Spyros' pathologicallly jealous wife, Jenny, of his suspicions. With Markos' help, Jenny and Potis put a tape recorder in Spyros' car, hoping to record proof of his affair with Lela but a malfunction makes it sound like it's Jenny and Potis having an affair. With both couples on the verge of divorcing, resolution comes when Markos' wife steps in to reveal that Markos' is a cinemaholic with a vivid imagination and her alleged affair was a visit to a doctor's practice. The three couples are now back together, Mina returns to Patra to get married, and Potis promises not to take Lela for granted ever again.

== Cast ==
- Vassilis Logothetidis ..... Potis Antonopoulos
- Ilya Livykou ..... Lela Antonopoulou
- Vangelis Protopappas ..... Markos Manolopoulos
- Smaro Stefanidou ..... Mina Moutsopoulou
- Lambros Konstantaras ..... Spyros Argyriou
- Kaiti Lambropoulou ..... Jenny Argyriou
- Kyveli Theochari ..... Kiki Manolopoulou
- Nikos Rizos ..... Mistos
- Taigeti ..... Ms. Kokkinou
- Antigone Koukouli ..... Katina
- Nikos Kazis ..... Pipis

== See also ==
- List of Greek films
