= A Hero in His Slippers =

- Film poster
- Directed by: Alekos Sakellarios
- Starring: Vasilis Logothetidis; Ilya Livykou
- Release date: 1958
- Running time: 1h 38min
- Country: Greece
- Language: Greek

A Hero in His Slippers (Greek: Ένας ήρως με παντούφλες) is a 1958 Greek comedy film directed by Alekos Sakellarios.

== Cast ==
- Vasilis Logothetidis - General Labros Dekavallas
- Ilya Livykou - Popi Dekavalla
- Nitsa Tsaganea - Eirini Dekavala
- Sonia Zoidou - Julia Dekavalla
- Lavrentis Dianellos - Apostolos Dekavallas
- Byron Pallis - Kostas Stoupatis
- Vangelis Protopapas - Sotiris Liveriadis Onaxios
- Giorgos Gavriilidis - Angelos Stamoulis
