= Ena votsalo sti limni =

Ena votsalo sti limni Ένα βότσαλο στη λίμνη
- Directed by: Alekos Sakellarios
- Written by: Alekos Sakellarios; Giannakopoulos
- Starring: Vassilis Logothetidis; Ilya Livykou; Vangelis Protopappas; Mary Lalopoulou; Stefanos Stratigos
- Edited by: Albert Najib
- Music by: André Ryder
- Distributed by: Finos Films
- Release date: 30 December 1952
- Running time: 86 minutes
- Country: Greece
- Language: Greek

Ena votsalo sti limni (Greek: Ένα βότσαλο στη λίμνη) is a 1955 Greek comedy film directed by Alekos Sakellarios and stars Vassilis Logothetidis and Ilya Livykou.

== Plot ==
A miserly man cheats his wife one night. A series of misunderstandings ensue that will entirely change his life.

== Cast ==
- Vasilis Logothetidis – as Manolis Skountris
- Ilya Livykou – as Evelyn
- Mary Lalopoulou – as Veta Skountri
- Vangelis Protopappas – as Giorgos (Yiorgos) Karanasos
- Kaiti Lambropoulou – as Margaret
- Stefanos Stratigos – as Vangelis
