= The Taxi Driver =

1953 film by Giorgos Tzavellas

- Directed by: Yorgos Tzavellas
- Written by: Yorgos Tzavellas
- Produced by: Yorgos Tzavellas
- Cinematography: Aristeidis Karydis-Fuchs
- Edited by: Dinos Katsouridis
- Music by: Mihalis Souyoul
- Production company: Finos Film
- Release date: 2 February 1953
- Running time: 95 minutes
- Country: Greece
- Language: Greek

The Taxi Driver (Greek: To soferaki) is a 1953 Greek comedy film directed by Yorgos Tzavellas and starring Mimis Fotopoulos, Smaroula Giouli, and Nikos Rizos.

== Cast ==
- Mimis Fotopoulos as Vangos
- Smaroula Giouli as Lela
- Nikos Rizos
- Giorgos Vlahopoulos
- Sperantza Vrana
- Thanasis Tzeneralis
- Lela Patrikiou
- Jenny Stavropoulou
- Giannis Ioannidis
- Lola Filippidou
- Elsa Rizou
- Giorgos Loukakis
- Kostas Papahristos

== Bibliography ==
- Vrasidas Karalis. A History of Greek Cinema. A&C Black, 2012.
