= The Germans Strike Again =

- Οι Γερμανοί ξανάρχονται (Oi Germanoi xanarhontai)
- Directed by: Alekos Sakellarios
- Written by: Alekos Sakellarios; Christos Giannakopoulos
- Screenplay by: Alekos Sakellarios
- Produced by: Filopimin Finos
- Starring: Vassilis Logothetidis; Mimis Fotopoulos; Vangelis Protopapas; Lavrentis Dianellos; Dinos Dimopoulos; Ilya Livykou; Nitsa Tsaganea; Christos Tsaganeas
- Cinematography: József Hepp
- Edited by: Filopimin Finos
- Music by: Costas Giannidis
- Production company: Finos Film
- Release date: 5 January 1948
- Running time: 90 minute
- Country: Greece
- Language: Greek

The Germans Strike Again is a Greek comedy-drama from 1948, directed by Alekos Sakellarios. The film notably states in the opening credits that it is "a satirical nightmare." The screenplay was written by the director in collaboration with Christos Giannakopoulos, based on a play by the latter. It was produced by Finos Film. The film stars Vasilis Logothetidis, Mimis Fotopoulos, Vangelis Protopapas, Lavrentis Dianellos, Dinos Dimopoulos, Ilya Livykou, Nitsa Tsaganea και Christos Tsaganeas.

The focus of the film is a peaceful family man, Thodoros, who, after the end of World War II and the Occupation in Athens, witnesses the passions of the civil conflict intensify, while everyone seems to have forgotten the tragedy of the Occupation. One night, he dreams that the Germans return, and everyone begins to relive the brutality they had experienced just a few years earlier.

== Plot ==
The film is set in Athens. It begins with Thodoros shopping from a street vendor, where he runs into an acquaintance. A little further on, two people are arguing about politics, and Thodoros expresses his disagreement with all of it. A bit down the road, he sees a wounded man, and soon after, he gets caught in crossfire, but he leaves unharmed. Shocked, he returns to the courtyard where he lives and tells his neighbors how much he despises the fact that, even after the war, Greece cannot find peace. Meanwhile, Zisis, one of his neighbors, reads in the newspaper that Hitler is supposedly still alive with Eva Braun somewhere in Tyrol. Not wanting to hear anything else, Thodoros goes to sit in his chair, where he eventually falls asleep.

He wakes up with a start when he hears voices outside shouting that Europe is once again under attack by the Germans. A narration follows, describing how Germany is beginning to rise and dominate Europe all over again. When the narration ends, the film returns to the courtyard, where everyone is gathered around, listening to German broadcasts on the radio. This second Occupation finds them all once more in the grip of hunger and despair: Zisis has roasted his dog, Flox; Ourania, Thodoros's wife, is boiling their canary, Tzitzifrigkos, to feed their daughter; and so on. At the same time, they notice a strange man loitering outside, watching them closely. Eventually, the man enters the courtyard, and after a brief interrogation, he discovers the radio they had hidden in their well. As a result, all the men in the courtyard are arrested.

The film shifts to a prison, where all the men have ended up in the same cell. With them is a fellow patriot who tells them that the bars are worn through and they'll be able to escape. After managing to break out, they find themselves in a psychiatric clinic, where five other patriots are waiting to guide them to the mountains. Thodoros stays behind to speak with Nikos, who is supposed to lead them there. Instead, a madman appears. At first, Thodoros finds himself agreeing with everything the man says, but eventually the confusion is cleared up, only to discover that the Germans have also arrived at the clinic. The strange man reappears, but in a heroic moment, a nurse, Elli, disarms him, and they manage to subdue him by tying him to a chair. Then, a gunfight breaks out.

The film ends with Thodoros mumbling in his sleep. He eventually realizes that everything had been just a nightmare, as he wakes to find his neighbors going about their usual routines. The film closes with a monologue from Thodoros, addressed to his canary, which he ultimately sets free from its cage.

== Cast ==
- Vasilis Logothetidis as Thodoros Ginopoulos
- Ilya Livykou as Elli
- Mimis Fotopoulos as Nikos
- Georgia Vasileiadou as Marigo
- Nitsa Tsaganea as Ourania Ginopoulou
- Lavrentis Dianellos as Lefteris
- Vangelis Protopapas as Zissis
- Dinos Dimopoulos as Xenophon
- Loukianos Rozan, spy
- Theophilos Assimakopoulos, prisoner
- Christos Tsaganeas as the madman
- Stefanos Stratigos
- Nikos Fermas

== Production ==
- The film was released in theaters across Athens, Piraeus, and the suburbs in 1948, drawing 136,033 tickets during its initial run.
- The film is a film adaptation of a stage play by Sakellarios and Giannakopoulos, which was originally performed under the same title during the 1946–47 winter season. The play premiered on Saturday, October 19, 1946, by the Marika Kotopouli troupe at the theater bearing her name within the "Rex" cinema-theater. Several of the actors from the original stage production also appeared in the film. At the time, the play made a strong impression, as political tensions in Greece remained high due to the ongoing Civil War.
- This was the first film directed by Sakellarios. In fact, he also appears in the film, playing the role of a man observing an argument.
- It was the first major commercial success for Finos Film and is considered a precursor to the company's (and Greek cinema's) many great successes that followed.
- Several well-known actors made their film debut in this movie, including Ilya Livykou, who later formed an inseparable cinematic and theatrical duo with Vasilis Logothetidis. It also marked the first appearance of one of Greek cinema's greatest tough guys, Nikos Fermas. Additionally, Stefanos Stratigos, Mimis Fotopoulos, Lavrentis Dianellos, and Giannis Heimonidis made their first appearances. The future Greek film director Dinos Dimopoulos also made his acting debut here. This film launched Georgia Vasileiadou’s career, turning her into a leading actress thereafter.
- Christos Tsaganeas steals the show as the madman, delivering the famous monologue: “People, bloodthirsty, blood-hungry, and savage... what’s the point of all this hatred and self-destruction?”
- At 50 years old and already an established theater actor, Vasilis Logothetidis gained wide recognition as one of Greece's top comedians of the time after this film. He went on to lead his own theater company for the next 12 years until his death in 1960.
- The film marked a milestone in sound recording technique thanks to its flawless synchronization of audio and visuals, unlike earlier films, where "actors would open and close their lips, but their speech wouldn’t be heard until several seconds later!" (Achilleas Mamakis, Ethnos newspaper, January 1948).
- In 1948, the Communist Party of Greece (KKE) expelled Mimis Fotopoulos because of his participation in the film.
- This is one of the first films to make a clear reference to the phenomenon of collaborationism in occupied Greece.
