= Ilya Livykou =

Greek actress (1919–2002)

- Ίλυα Λιβυκού
- Born: Amalia Hatzaki (Greek: Αμαλία Χατζάκη); 1919; Heraklion, Crete, Kingdom of Greece
- Died: 6 September 2002 (aged 82–83); Athens, Greece
- Other name: Amalia Kozyri (Greek: Αμαλία Κοζύρη)
- Occupation: Actress
- Spouse: Agissilaos Kozyris
- Partner: Vassilis Logothetidis
- Children: 3

Ilya Livykou ^{α} (Greek: Ίλυα Λιβυκού; 1919–2002) was a Greek actress. Livykou is known for her partnership with Vassilis Logothetidis.

== Biography ==
Livykou was born Amalia Hatzaki^{β} (Greek: Αμαλία Χατζάκη) in 1919 in Heraklion, Kingdom of Greece (present-day Greece).

She began her education in javelin throwing and studied law in Athens. She brought her tests and marked excellently at the Dramatic School of the Royal Theatre. Her first part was at the theatre that she done in 1947 and from 1948 until 1960, played with Logothetidis. Her first film was The Germans are Coming by Alekos Sakellarios (1948).

In 1985 when her daughter Eva (one of the three children of her first husband Agissilaos Kozyris) suffered brain tumor and died in Kypseli. She is buried in Kaisariani next to her daughter.

== Filmography ==
Year	Film	Transliteration and translation	Role
1948	The Germans Strike Again	Οι Γερμανοί ξανάρχονται I Yermani xanarhonde	Elli
1952	Ena votsalo sti limni	Ένα βότσαλο στη λίμνη	Evelyn (Vangelitsa)
1953	Santa Chiquita	Σάντα Τσικίτα	Chiquita López
1954	Despoinis eton 39	Δεσποινίς ετών 39	Fofo
1955	Oute gata oute zimia	Ούτε γάτα ούτε ζημιά	Popi Makrykosta / Maria Koutrouba
1955	I kalpiki lira	Η κάλπικη λίρα	Fifi
1956	O ziliarogatos	Ο ζηλιαρόγατος	Lela Antonopoulou
1957	Delistavrou kai yios	Δελησταύρου και υιός	Rena Hadjilouka
1958	A Hero in His Slippers	Ένας ήρωας με παντούφλες Enas iroas me pantoufles	Popi Dekavala
1961	I katara tis manas	Η κατάρα της μάνας	Despo Liakoura
1962	Antigone	Αντιγόνη	Eurydice
1963	Enas delikanis	Ένας ντελικανής	Irinaki
1963	Iligos	Ίλιγγος	Kostas's mother
1964	Kravgi	Κραυγή	Joulia Petratou
1964	Thirsty for Life	Δίψα για ζωή Dipsa gia zoi	Elena Negreponti
1965	The Winner	Ο νικητής O nikitis	Elsa Vassiliadou
1966	Ta mystika tis amartolis Athinas	Τα μυστικά της αμαρτωλής Αθήνας	Rena Karnassaki
1968	Ta psichoula tou kosmou	Τα ψίχουλα του κόσμου Crumbs from the People	Flora's mother
1971	I charavgi tis nikis	Η χαραυγή της νίκης	Chrysanthi Petraki
1972	Oi xenitemenoi	Οι ξενιτεμένοι	Maria
1972	Antartes ton poleon	Αντάρτες των πόλεων	Mrs. Papadima
1974	Erastes tou oneirou	Εραστές του ονείρου	Georgette Kyriazi

== Notes ==
^α Also anglicised as Ilia Livykou
^β Also anglicised as Amalia Hadjaki
