= Mary Giatra Lemou =

Egyptian-born Greek actress

Mary Giatra Lemou Μαίρη Γιατρά Λεμού
- Born: 1915; Alexandria, Sultanate of Egypt
- Died: 17 November 1989 (aged 73–74)
- Occupation: actress

Mary Giatra Lemou (Greek: Μαίρη Γιατρά Λεμού, 1915–1989) was an Egyptian-born Greek actress. She was born in Alexandria. She studied theatricals in the dramatics at the National Theatre and piano at the Greek Odeum of Athens. She first appeared in the national theatre and the company Marika Kotopoli. In 1936 and 1937 she entered the Artistic Theatre with Tzavalas Karousos where she played many important roles. She worked with Karolos Coon in the first theatrical acts by Anton Chekhov and with Thymelikos Theatrical Company with Linos Karzis in 1938/39. In the spring of 1940, she entered the accomplishable youth theatrical company at the Zefiros Theatre. In the summer of 1941, she participated again in another successful youth theatrical company together with Minis Fotopoulos at the Nana Theatre on Vouliagmenis Avenue.

During World War II (1942–44), there were basic cadets of the public Armed Forces Group Council in the Middle East, she participated with prolongation in Egypt, Syria, Palestine and Jordan. From 1944, she entered with her right to the theatrical company in Egypt, came into the Alexandria area. In 1945, she took part with her husband with the artistic council in the first Pancypriot Theatre (Prometheus) where she first acted in many works until she finished in 1946. In her later years (1947–56), she participated with the actor, director, husband Adamantios Lemos in his own Lemos Theatrical Company and in 1957–67, worked together in New York in the USA with the only Greek Theatre Organization in America.

She had dramatic actors at the theatre with spiritual artists and tried interpretatively in a rich repertory which presented for a few years.

Mary Giatra Lemou was educated with literature and poetry and wrote a book (Zoi oniro ke theatro, Hroniko 1940–43, Ζωή όνειρο και Θέατρο, Χρονικό 1940–1943) and a political council (Apohoi, Athens 1981). She acted in a Cypriot theatre (1945/46), the dramatic school at Larissa Public Odeon (1947–50) and in New York (1957–67), for her stem of that theatrical company which achieved further.
