= The Heart of the Greek =

1953 film

- Directed by: Iason Novak
- Written by: Themis Naltsas
- Cinematography: Tonis Novak
- Production company: Novak-Film
- Release date: 1953
- Running time: 88 minutes
- Country: Greece
- Language: Greek

The Heart of the Greek (Greek: Romeiki kardia) is a 1953 Greek comedy film directed by Iason Novak and starring Mimis Fotopoulos, Giorgos Vlahopoulos and Soula Dimitriou.

== Cast ==
- Mimis Fotopoulos
- Giorgos Vlahopoulos
- Soula Dimitriou
- Dimitris Dounakis
- Mary Egipidou
- Lola Filippidou
- Sotiria Iatridou
- Dimitris Koukis
- Kostas Oikonomidis
- Giorgos Rois
