= Lovers' Gang =

- Greek: Συμμορία εραστών
- Directed by: Vangelis Serdaris
- Written by: Assimakis Gialamas; Kostas Pretenteris
- Based on: He Was a Playboy by Assimakis Gialamas; Kostas Pretenteris
- Starring: Dinos Iliopoulos; Maro Kontou; Nikos Rizos; Kaiti Panou; Aliki Zografou; Vasos Andrianos; Panos Velias; Thanos Martinos; Andreas Tsakonas; Vasos Andronidis; Elsa Rizou; Gogo Antzoletaki
- Cinematography: Dimos Sakelariou
- Distributed by: Klearchos Konitsiotis
- Release date: 1972
- Running time: 96 minutes
- Country: Greece
- Language: Greek

Lovers' Gang (Greek: Συμμορία εραστών) is a 1972 Greek black-and-white film starring Dinos Iliopoulos, Maro Kontou, Nikos Rizos and Kaiti Panou. Directed by Vangelis Serdaris, the screenplay is by Kostas Pretenteris, based on the play by himself and Asimakis Gialamas entitled He Was a Playboy.

== Plot ==
After years of wandering in international social circles, a veteran womanizer, Renos Kampanas (Dinos Iliopoulos), returns to Greece with the intention of opening a school for playboys. His old friend Tzortzis Kotsiras (Nikos Rizos), who works as a bartender, invests money in his plan to help him. Renos will soon gather several students whom he trains and transports to Nafplio, where the final stage of their training will take place. They must charm wealthy ladies. Renos will fall in love with Elena Georgiadou-Vayianou (Maro Kontou), with whom he has a daughter, but without knowing it. His daughter, who works at the hotel where they are staying, will fall in love with one of his students. The lovers will quickly turn into men in love, each finding the love of his life.

== Cast ==
- Dinos Iliopoulos as Renos Kampanas
- Maro Kontou as Elena Georgiadou-Vagianou
- Nikos Rizos as Tzortzis Kotsiras
- Kaiti Panou as Yvoni Saranti
- Aliki Zografou as Magda Saltamouri
- Vasos Adrianos as Alexis Romanos
- Panos Velias as Giagos Marmarinos
- Thanos Martinos as Iason Dendis
- Andreas Tsakonas as Fanouris Tzouras
- Vasos Andronidis as Sotiriou
- Elsa Rizou
- Gogo Antzoletaki as Georgiadou
- Mary Farmaki as Skentzou

== See also ==
- List of Greek films
