= Enas delikanis =

Enas delikanis Ένας ντελικανής
- Directed by: Manolis Skouloudis
- Written by: Manolis Skouloudis
- Starring: Alkis Giannaikas; Manos Katrakis; Ilya Livykou; Kleo Skouloudi; Dionyssis Papayannopoulos; Kostas Kazakos; Anna Paitazi; Aliki Zografou; Efi Ikonomou
- Music by: Giannis Markopoulos
- Distributed by: Mask Films
- Release date: 14 December 1963
- Running time: 90 minutes
- Country: Greece
- Language: Greek

Enas delikanis (Greek: Ένας ντελικανής) is a 1963 Greek film directed by Manolis Skouloudis. It stars Ilya Livykou and Dionysis Papagiannopoulos. It was filmed on the island of Crete.

== Plot ==
The son of Pontikaki, Manouelis, had grown up and became more beautiful. All the ladies from the village knew that were much from all the singing women, Paraskevoula. Manouelis fell in love with Smaragditsa. His father tried to bring himself a shame, brought his aunt Eirinaki which she lives in the mountains along with their friends. As her aunt seduced from her beauty and that she wanted to love. Manouelis left from the mountains and headed for Ladochori at the time they had a funeral. The president of the village wrote from his voice that received and knew the spot that the singer and headed to the house in which live their six ladies.

== Cast ==
- Alkis Giannakas as Manouilis Pontikis
- Manos Katrakis as Pan
- Ilya Livykou as Eirinaki or Irinaki
- Kleo Skouloudi as the singer's wife
- Dionyssis Papayannopoulos as the mayor
- Kostas Kazakos as Leonidas
- Anna Paitazi
- Aliki Zografou as Panago Pontiki
- Efi Ikonomou as Rosie

== Awards ==
- 5 awards at the 1963 Thessaloniki Film Festival (photography (Dimos Sakellariou), first ladies role (Ilya Livykou), critic photography (Dimos Sakellariou), first ladies critic role (Ilya Livykou, and Alkis Giannakas)
- First Ladies role (Ilya Livykou) at the 1963 San Francisco Film Festival

== Other information ==
- Tickets: 295,493
- It was the first film appearance by Alkis Giannakas.

== See also ==
- List of Greek films
