= Despoinis eton 39 =

Despoinis eton 39 Δεσποινίς ετών 39
- Directed by: Alekos Sakellarios
- Written by: Alekos Sakellarios; Christos Giannakopoulos
- Starring: Vassilis Logothetidis; Ilya Livykou; Smaro Stefanidou; Vangelis Protopappas; Stefanos Stratigos hanasis Tzeneralis; Dina Stathatou
- Edited by: Albert Najib
- Music by: André Ryder
- Distributed by: Melas Film
- Release date: 30 August 1954
- Running time: 98 minutes
- Country: Greece
- Language: Greek

Despinis eton 39 or Despinis eton 39 (Greek: Δεσποινίς ετών 39 A 39-year-old Lady) is a 1954 Greek drama-comedy film directed by Alekos Sakellarios and starring Vassilis Logothetidis, Smaro Stefanidou and Ilya Livykou.

== Plot ==
It starts for a classical theme of his brother/sister? which he cannot get married unless he first restore his brother. In this, the downfall of a great person, loved by a younger lady which he absolutely to torn as an extreme between these messages about the marriage. In order to hide her real age of the sister which she present as a 39 year old lady (as does as the movie title). Later on, these different tragic comedy situations in which planned to failed. The movie returned again by the same director in 1968 with Lambros Konstantaras in O Romios ehi filotimo

== Cast ==
- Vasilis Logothetidis - Tilemahos Karadaris
- Smaro Stefanidou - Hrysanthi Karadari
- Ilya Livykou - Fofo
- Vangelis Protopapas - Kriton Stefanis
- Stefanos Stratigos - Rokas
- Thanasis Tzeneralis - Stamatis

== See also ==
- List of Greek films
- Greek films of the 1950s
