= Christos Tsaganeas =

Greek actor and cinematographer (1906–1976)

- Χρήστος Τσαγανέας
- Born: 2 July 1906; Brăila, Kingdom of Romania
- Died: 2 July 1976 (aged 70); Athens, Greece
- Resting place: First Cemetery of Athens
- Occupation: Actor
- Spouse: Nitsa Tsaganea
- Children: 1

Christos Tsaganeas (Greek: Χρήστος Τσαγανέας; 2 July 1906 – 2 July 1976) was a Greek actor and a cinematographer.

== Early life ==
Tsaganeas was born in Brăila, Romania.

== Career ==
He starred in several movies, his most famous role being the college headmaster in To xylo vgike ap' ton paradeiso. His first important role was in The Germans are Coming with Vassilis Logothetidis where he says the well known phrase Anthropoi, anthropoi. Aimostageis, aimodipseis kai aimovoroi. Pros ti to missos ke o allilosparagmos.

== Personal life ==
He married, secondly, to Nitsa Tsaganea.

== Death ==
He died on his 70th birthday and was buried in the First Cemetery. His wife and their daughter were later buried alongside him.

== Filmography ==
Year	Film	Transliteration and translation	Role
1933	Bad Road	Κακός δρόμος = Kakos dromos	-
1948	The Germans Strike Again	Oι Γερμανοί ξανάρχονται (I Yermani xanarhonte)	-
1954	A Happy Beginning	Χαρούμενο ξεκίνημα	-
1954	The Wind of Hate	Ο άνεμος του μίσους	-
1955	Laterna, ftocheia ke filotimo	Λατέρνα, φτώχεια και φιλότιμο	-
1955	Joe the Menace	Τζο ο Τρομερός (Joe o Tromeros)	-
1955	To findanaki	Το φιντανάκι	Giavroussis
1958	The Misogynist	Ο μισογύνης	-
1958	We Have Only One Life	Μια ζωή την έχουμε (Mia zoi tin ehoume)	bank manager
1959	Maiden's Cheek	Το ξύλο βγήκε από τον παράδεισο	school manager
1959	Na zisoun to ftochopaida	Να ζήσουν τα φτωχόπαιδα (Long Live the Poor Folk)	-
1959	A Crime in Kolonaki	Έγκλημα στο Κολωνάκι	Kostas Floras
1959	A Vacation in Godforsakenland	Διακοπές στην Κολοπετινίτσα (Diakopes stin Kolopetinitsa)	-
1960	The Urchin	Το χαμίνι	-
1960	Murder Backstage	Έγκλημα στα παρασκήνια	Pavlos Stefanou
1961	Ta niata theloun erota	Έγκλημα στα παρασκήνια ('Those Youngsters Want Love)	-
1961	Don't Cry for Me	Μην κλάψεις για μένα (A Tear for Me)	-
1961	Mana mou parastratissa	Μάνα μου, παραστράτησα (Mother, I've Strayed Away)	-
1961	Ftohadakia kai leftades	Φτωχαδάκια και λεφτάδες	Leonidas Dekrissis
1961	Pios tha krini ti kinonia	Ποιος θα κρίνει την κοινωνία	-
1962	O Theodoros ke to dikanno	Ο Θεόδωρος και το δίκαννο	-
1962	Prodomeni agapi	Προδομένη αγάπη	-
1962	Sidewalk	Πεζοδρόμιο (Pezodromio)	-
1962	Orfani se xena heria	Ορφανή σε ξένα χέρια	-
1962	Min erotevessai to Savvato	Μην ερωτεύεσαι το Σαββάτο (Never Do Love on a Saturday)	-
1962	I kyria tou kyriou	Η κυρία του κυρίου	-
1962	O Thodoros kai to dikanno	Ο Θόδωρος και το δίκαννο (Thodoros and the Legalist)	-
1962	I katatregmeni	Οι κατατρεγμένοι	-
1963	Osa kryvei i nychta	Όσα κρύβει η νύχτα (Osa kryvei i nyhta)	-
1963	My Friend Lefterakis	Ο φίλος μου ο Λευτεράκης (O filos mou o Lefterakis)	a doctor
1963	O dromos me ta kokkinia fota	Ο δρόμος με τα κόκκινα φώτα (The Road Filled with Red Lights)	-
1964	Ine varys o ponos mou	Είναι βαρύς ο πόνος μου (You Are Heavy My Pain)	-
1964	Something Is Burning	Κάτι να καίει	-
1964	An ehis tyhi	Αν έχεις τύχη (If You Have Any Luck)	-
1964	Alygisti sti zoi	Αλύγιστη στη ζωή	-
1965	Tou horismou o ponos	Του χωρισμού ο πόνος	-
1965	I storgi	Η στοργή (The Affection)	-
1965	I pikragapimeni	Η πικραγαπημένη	-
1965	Ftohos, alla timios	Φτωχός, αλλά τίμιος	-
1966	Thysia	Θυσία	-
1966	Ena karavi Papadopouloi	Ένα καράβι Παπαδόπουλοι = The Papadopoulos' Ship	-
1966	The Artist	Η αρτίστα (I artista)	-
1966	5,000 Lies	5.000 ψέματα (5,000 Psemmata)	-
1967	The Satrap	Ο σατράπης (I satrapis)	-
1967	To plio tis haras	Το πλοίο της χαράς	-
1967	To pio lambro asteri	Το πιο λαμπρό αστέρι (The Most Shining Star)	-
1967	Kokovios ke sparos sta dihtya tis arahnis	Κοκοβιός και σπάρος στα δίχτυα της αράχνης	-
1967	To dollaria tis Aspasias	Τα δολλάρια της Ασπασίας (Aspasias's Dollar)	-
1967	My Dimitri... My Dimitri	Δημήτρη μου... Δημήτρη μου (Dimitri mou... Dimitri mou)	-
1967	O Romios ehi filotimo	Ο Ρωμιός έχει φιλότιμο	-
1968	O paliatsos	Ο παλιάτσος (The Buffoon)	-
1968	Apollo Goes on Holiday		-
1968	Doktor Zi-Vengos		-
1968	I andreas den lygizoun pote	Οι άντρες δεν λυγίζουν ποτέ	-
1969	Enas magkas sta salonia	Ένας μάγκας στα σαλόνια (A Gentlemen in the Family Room)	-
1970	O aktipitos htipithike	Ο ακτύπητος χτυπήθηκε	
1971	Sergios and Anna	Σέργιος και Άννα	-
1971	Mia yineka fevgei	Μια γυναίκα φεύγει (The Woman is Leaving)	-
1971	Mara and the Gypsy	Μάρα και η τσιγγάνα (Mara ke i tsingana)	-
1971	O Manolios xanaktypa	Ο Μανολιός ξανακτυπά	-
1971	O krevatomourmoura	Η κρεβατομουρμούρα	Mavromihaleas
1971	Ena agori alloptiko ap' ta alla	Ένα αγόρι αλλιώτικο απ' τα άλλα	-
