= All the Night Hides =

- Greek: Όσα κρύβει η νύχτα
- Directed by: Stelis Zografakis
- Written by: Nikos Foskolos
- Starring: Petros Fyssoun; Martha Vourtsi; Dionyssis Papayannopoulos; Andreas Douzos; Efi Oikonomou; Hristos Tsaganeas; Nitsa Tsaganea; Nikos Fermas
- Music by: Christos Mourabas
- Distributed by: Koronet (Coronet) Film
- Release date: 11 November 1963
- Running time: 90 minutes
- Country: Greece
- Language: Greek

All the Night Hides (Greek: Greek: Όσα κρύβει η νύχτα, lit. "As Long as the Night is Hidden", alternative Greek title Agria nychta (Άγρια νύχτα)) is a 1963 Greek theatrical comedy film directed by Stelios Zografakis.

The film stars Petros Fyssoun, Martha Vourtsi, Dionysis Papayiannopoulos, Andreas Douzos, Efi Oikonomou, Hristos Tsaganeas, Nitsa Tsaganea and Nikos Fermas.

== Plot ==
A youth is drawn to crime in the pursuit of easy wealth.

== Cast ==
- Petros Fyssoun ..... Sotiris Kapayas
- Andreas Douzos ..... Alekos
- Martha Vourtsi ..... Soula
- Dionysis Papagiannopoulos ..... Thomas
- Christos Tsaganeas ..... Dimitris
- Efi Economou ..... Nadia
- Nikos Fermas ..... car salesman
- Nitsa Tsaganea ..... Alexandra
- Kostas Papachristos ..... police captain

== Information ==
- Genre: Drama
- Colour: Black and white
- Tickets: 118,113
- Participated at the 1963 Thessaloniki Film Festival
