= One Street Organ, One Life =

- Film poster
- Directed by: Sokrates Kapsaskis
- Written by: Sokrates Kapsaskis
- Starring: Orestis Makris, Jenny Karezi
- Cinematography: Grigoris Danalis
- Edited by: Memas Papadatos
- Music by: Manos Hatzidakis
- Release date: 1958
- Running time: 77 minutes
- Country: Greece
- Language: Greek

One Street Organ, One Life or Mia laterna, Mia Zoi (Greek: Μια λατέρνα, Μια Ζωή) is a 1958 Greek film directed by Sokrates Kapsaskis and written by Yorgos Javellas. It stars Orestis Makris, Jenny Karezi, Petros Fyssoun, Dinos Iliopoulos, Nitsa Tsaganea and Lavrentis Dianellos. The film is about a street musician who loses his wife during childbirth and puts his baby daughter up for adoption, but comes to bitterly regret it.
