= Nitsa Tsaganea =

Greek actress

- Born: Eleni Laskari; February 17, 1902; Athens, Kingdom of Greece
- Died: April 30, 2002 (aged 100); Athens, Greece
- Occupation: Actress
- Spouse: Christos Tsaganeas
- Children: 1
- Relatives: Marialena Oikonomidou (granddaughter)

Nitsa Tsaganea (Greek: Νίτσα Τσαγανέα; 17 February 1902 – 30 April 2002) was a Greek actress of theatre and film.

== Biography ==
Eleni Laskari (Ελένη Λάσκαρη) was the second wife of actor Christos Tsaganeas. Her most famous movies were Enas iroas me pantoufles and The Germans Strike Again.

Tsaganea died on 30 April 2002 and was buried at the Athens First Cemetery, next to her daughter, actress Liana Vitsori.

== Selected filmography ==
| Year | Film | Transliteration and translation |
|---|---|---|
| 1957 | The Germans Strike Again | Οι Γερμανοί ξανάρχονται (Oi Germanoi xanarhonte) |
| 1950s | One Street Organ, One Life | Μια λατέρνα, μια ζωή (Mia laterna, mia zoi) |
| 1958 | A Hero in His Slippers | Ένας ήρως με παντούφλες (Enas iros me padoufles) |
| 1959 | How Married People Live | Πώς περνούν οι παντρεμένοι (Pos pernoun oi pantremenoi) |
| 1962 | Thodoros and the Shotgun | Ο Θόδωρος και το δίκαννο (O Thodoros kai to dikano) |
| 1963 | All the Night Hides | Όσα κρύβει η νύχτα (Osa kryvei i nyhta) |
| 1967 | The Brightest Star | Το πιο λαμπρό αστέρι (To pio labro asteri) |
| 1971 | Curtain Lecture | Η κρεβατομουρμούρα (I krevvatomourmoura) |
| 1982 | Alaloum | Αλαλούμ |
