= To thyma =

1969 film by Dinos Dimopoulos

- Directed by: Dinos Dimopoulos
- Written by: Lakis Michaelides
- Produced by: Filopoimin Finos
- Starring: Kostas Voutsas; Alekos Tzanetakos; Zozo Sapountzaki; Spyros Kalogirou; Eleni Dakoronia; Nikos Paschalidis; Athinodoros Prousalis
- Cinematography: Nikos Dimopoulos
- Edited by: Leonidas Antonakis
- Music by: Mimis Plessas
- Production company: Finos Film
- Release date: 24 February 1969
- Running time: 98 minutes
- Country: Greece
- Language: Greek

To thyma or To thima (Greek: Το θύμα) is a 1969 Greek comedy film directed and written by Dinos Dimopoulos and starring Kostas Voutsas, Alekos Tzanetakos and Zozo Sampoutzaki.

== Plot ==
Michalis (Kostas Voutsas), a hardworking villager, engaged to Sofoula (Eleni Dakoronia), who works hard on cows so that his little brother, Dimitris (Alekos Tzanetakos), who is studying in Athens, does not lack anything, goes to the capital because he is worried about him, while at the same time he wants to look after his back, which hurts from too much work. In Athens, however, his brother lives the high life, spending the money his brother sends him, staying up all night to the bouzoukis sung by Bella Boula (Zozo Sapountzaki) with his friends, Dino (Thanasis Papadopoulos), Rita (Vasso Voulgaraki) and Souzi (Mary Kyvelou).

Michalis, upon arriving in Athens, discovers his brother's lies, but Dimitris manages to "cover them up" by saying that Anestis Kaloumbas (Nikitas Platis), the owner of the nightclub, is a bookseller. Later, he meets Bella and goes crazy with her. He goes to the nightclub where she sings, secretly from his brother, and partys with her, spending a lot of money. However, Dimitris sees them and informs Dino. Michalis accompanies Bella to her house, but outside, they are seen by her strict brother, Stratis (Spyros Kalogirou), who works at the vegetable market, and Michalis is forced to come the next day and get engaged to Bella. He also sends telegrams to his village saying that he has a discopathy to delay it a little longer, forcing Sofoula and her father, Sir-Sotiris (Nikos Paschalidis), to come to him.

Bella, however, makes him spend a lot of money for her sake, until she asks him to pay to record albums for her with Babis Baglamis (Athinodoros Prousalis) and Mitsos Tonos (Nikos Tsoukas). Then, Dimitris decides to take matters into his own hands: he informs Bella's strict brother to intervene and get Bella together at the same time that Sofoula and her father arrived in Athens. After all this, Sofoula is hurt and leaves. Michalis returns to his village with Dimitris, making them believe that Michalis really has a herniated disc and Sofoula forgives him. Dimitris, having a brain, also gets his degree in Agriculture. In the end, Dimitris digs in the fields and Michalis and Sofoula have a baby.

== Cast ==
- Kostas Voutsas as Mihalis Koutsopetalos
- Zozo Sapountzaki as Bella Boula
- Alekos Tzanetakos as Totos Koutsopetalos
- Spyros Kalogirou as Stratis
- Athinodoros Prousalis as Babis Baglamis
- Nikos Tsoukas as Mitsos Tonos
- Nikitas Platis as Anestis Kaloubas
- Thanasis Papadopoulos as Dinos
- Nikos Paschalidis as Sotiris
- Kostas Papachristos as doctor

== Production ==
This is an adaptation of the film Father, Sit Wisely (1967) by the same screenwriter, which starred Lambros Konstantaras in the role of the father from the countryside.

== Release ==
The film premiered on February 24, 1969. Selling 415,319 tickets, it ranked 8th among 108 films of the same season. It was also released on DVD on February 7, 2006.
