= Athinodoros Prousalis =

Greek actor (1926–2012)

- Αθηνόδωρος Προύσαλης
- Born: 15 December 1926; Istanbul, Turkey
- Died: 5 June 2012 (aged 85); Haidari, Greece
- Resting place: First Cemetery of Athens
- Citizenship: Turkey (by birthplace); Greece (naturalized)
- Occupation: Actor
- Years active: 1952–2011
- Employer: Finos Film
- Spouse: Toula Prousali (divorced)
- Children: 1

Athinodoros Prousalis (Greek: Αθηνόδωρος Προύσαλης; 15 December 1926 – 5 June 2012) was a Greek actor of cinema, television, and theatre.

== Biography ==
He was born on 15 December 1926, in Istanbul.

Prousalis married Toula, a woman from Thessaloniki. Although the couple divorced, they maintained a close and supportive relationship, with Toula caring for him until the end of his life. They had a daughter, the theatre specialist Evi Prousali (b. 1967).

Prousalis died of a cardiac arrest at Attikon University Hospital on 5 June 2012, at age 85. He was buried with a civil funeral two days later at Cholargos Cemetery. His bones were later exhumed and transferred to the artists' mausoleum at the First Cemetery of Athens.

== Filmography ==
Year	Film	Transliteration and translation	Role
1957	Laterna, ftohia kai garyfalo	Λατέρνα, φτώχεια και γαρύφαλλο	a poor tavern customer
1960	Stratiotes dichos stoli	Στρατιώτες δίχως στολή	-
1963	O trelaras	Ο τρελάρας	-
1963	Polytechnitis kai erimospitis	Πολυτεχνίτης και ερημοσπίτης	Panagos
1965	The Soil is Coloured Red	Το χώμα βάφτηκε κόκκινα To homa vaftike kokkina	-
1964	To doloma	Το δόλωμα	paper robber
1965	Teddy Boy My Love	Τέντυ μπόι αγάπη μου Teddy Boy agapi mou	Kiriakos
1965	Ena Exypno Exypno Moutro	Ένα έξυπνο έξυπνο μούτρο	Babis
1965	Istorias mias zois	Ιστορία μιας ζωής	Giorgis
1965	Mia trelli... trelli oikogeneia	Μια τρελλή... τρελλη οικογένεια A Lazy... Lazy Family	a worker
1966	Jenny Jenny	Τζένη Τζένη	a car driver
1967	Fever on the Road	Πυρετός στην άσφαλτο Piretos stin asfalto	-
1967	Stay Calm Dad	Πατέρα κάτσε φρόνιμα Patera katse fronima	Periklis
1967	Welcome to the Dollar	Καλώς ήρθε το δολλάριο	Stamatis
1967	O modistros	Ο μόδιστρος	Koulis
1967	Kapote klaine kai oi doinatoi	Κάποτε κλαίνε και οι δυνατοί	Vangelis
1968	An Italian woman from Kypseli	Μια Ιταλίδα απ' την Κυψέλη; Mia Italida ap' tin Kipseli	a store owner
1968	Epicheirisis Apollon	Επιχείρησις Απόλλων	a bus driver
1968	I kardia enos aliti	Η καρδιά ενός αλήτη	Konstantis
1968	To kanoni kai t'aidoni	Το κανόνι και τ' αηδόνι	-
1969	Fovatai o Yiannis to therio	Φοβάται ο Γιάννης το θεριό	-
1969	I orea tou kourea	Η ωραία του κουραία The Beauty of the Barber	-
1969	Yiati me prodosses	Γιατί με πρόδωσες	-
1969	To thyma or To thima	Το θύμα	Babis
1970	O nanos kai oi efta Chionates	Ο νάνος και οι εφτά Χιονάτες	Apostolis
1970	O daskalaskos itan Leventia	Ο δασκαλάκος ήταν Λεβεντιά	a president of a community
1971	Manolios in Europe	Ο Μανωλιός στην Ευρώπη; O Manolios stin Evropi	-
1971	O trelopenintaris	Ο τρελοπενηντάρης The Crazy Fifty Year Old	Frixos
1971	Agapissa mia polithrona	Αγάπησα μια πολυθρόνα	-
1971	I efoplistina	Η εφοπλιστίνα	Nikitas
1972	Ap' ta alonia sta salonia	Απ' τα αλώνια στα σαλόνια	Grigoris
1972	Rena is Offside	Η Ρένα είναι off-side I Rena ine ofsaid	a police officer
1973	O proestos tou choriou	Ο προεστός του χωριού	Diamandis
1979	Mona zyga dika mou	Μονά ζυγά δικά μου	-
1979	Ta pedia tis piatsas	Τα παιδιά τις πιάτσας	-
1979	I fandarines	Οι φανταρίνες	a military commander
1980	O anthropos me to garyfallo	Ο ανθρωπος με το γαρύφαλλο	a constitutional leader
1980	Rena, na i efkairia	Ρένα, να η ευκαιρία	a police officer
1982	O periergos	Ο περίεργος	-
1982	Repo	Ρεπό	-
1983	Daskale ti didaskes	Δάσκαλε τι δίδασκες;	-
1984	Voyage to Cythera	Ταξίδι στα Κύθηρα; Taxidi sta Kythira	a police officer
1985	Rakos... no. 14, kai o protos bounakias	Ράκος... no. 14, και ο πρώτος μπουνάκιας	-
1985	Mia nyfi gia olous (Video movie)	Μια νύφη για όλους A Niece for All	-
1985	Rambo from Trikala	Ο Ράμπο από τα Τρίκαλα; O Rambo apo ta Trikala	Vladimiros
1985	O Angalitsas	Ο Αγκαλίτσας	a police officer
1986	The Beekeeper	Ο μελισσοκόμος O melissokomos	-
1986	Adelfi mou... Agapi mou...	Αδελφή μου... Αγάπη μου...	-
1987	A Liar from Katakolo (Video movie)	Η ψευτρα απο το Κατάκολο; I pseftra apo to Katakolo	Leon
1987	120 Decibels (Video film)	120 Ντεσιμπέλ; 120 Decibel	-
1987	S' agapao, sto timoni pou kratao (Direct-to-video) | Σ' αγαπάω, στο τιμόνι που κρατάω I Love You, on the Wheels I Hold	Anestis	
1987	The Thirteen Women (direct-to-video)	Οι Δεκατρεις γυναίκες I Dekatris yinekes	-
1987	To 'pe, to 'pe o papagalos, eisai kokoras megalos (direct-to-video)	Το 'πε, το 'πε ο παπαγάλος, είσαι κόκορας μεγάλος	the professor
1989	O teleftaios peirasmos tou Mitsou (direct-to-video)	Ο τελευταίος πειρασμός του Μήτσου	Savvas
1990	O erastis (direct-to-video)	Ο εραστής	-
1991	The Athenians	Οι Αθηναίοι; I Athinei	-
1991	O drapetis	Ο δραπέτης	-
1991	To meteoro vima tou pelargou	Το μετέωρο βήμα του πελαργού	a hotel manager
2003	A Touch of Spice	Πολίτικη κουζίνα Politiki kouzina	a friend of a grandfather

== Television ==
Show	Transliteration and translation	Broadcaster	Role
Englimata	Εγκλήματα	ANT1	-
Oi atairiastoi	Οι αταίριαστοι	-	-
