= Stefanos Stratigos =

Greek actor

- Born: 1923; Athens, Greece
- Died: April 6, 2006 (aged 82–83); Athens, Greece
- Occupation: Actor

Stefanos Stratigos (Greek: Στέφανος Στρατηγός; 1923 – April 6, 2006) was a Greek actor in film and television.

== Biography ==
He was born in Athens in 1923 and was the son of the actors Vasileios and Amalia Stratigos. His sisters were actors Aleka and Stella Stratigou. He had another sister named Rena. In which they resided early to the theatre and film. He attended the Drama School then known as the Royal Theatre of Greece.

He began to play at his father's role and in comedies, tragedies, plays and dramas. After the theatrical crowds, he played with Vasilis Logothetidis' company,

He took part in Enas aprosklitos moussafiris (in which he made his debut on stage) The Trojan War, Rena is Locked Out, Santa Chiquita, Kyrios tou Maxim, etc. He also took part with other performers including Vassilis Argyropoulos, Chrysoula Doxa, Horn-Lampeti in 1956 and 1957 in the work Vrochopios, Aristocratic Way, Iliopoulos company in which he took part from 1960 until 1962 in works by Alekos Sakellarios, Christos Giannakopoulos, Dimitris Psathas, the play Exochikon kentron o eros, Mistress Vagoni in the company Vembo (in Stournara 288, Anthropoi kai palianthropou), Chatziskou, Samartzis.

With Horn-Lambeti in 1958, they played in the play I kiria me tis kamelies, in which he acted as Baron de Varville. In 1963, he formed his own company with his first wife Gely Mavropoulou. Presented the work Red Lights with Al. Galanos, a play by Norman Krasna, a play by John Patrick, and others, one of those he made even on stage.

He toured Northern Greece in 1965. His company featured Dionyssis Papayiannopoulos and played at the Alhambra Theatre. He performed in the work How I Am Going to Be Rich by Gerassimos Stavros with Papayiannopoulos, Mavropoulos, Moschidis, Krevata, Negkas, Ria Deloutsi, Tsouka, etc. The play did not have much success, it was ended in two months and was followed by a play by Nikos Tsiforos.

He made his worldwide tour and participated as a company leader with Nikos Xanthopoulos, Eleni Anoussaki, Vilma Kyrou, Giorgos Konstantinou and Kaiti Papanika, Giorgos Fountas, Giannis Gkionakis, Thanassis Vengos, Martha Vourtsi, Vasilis Diamantopoulos and Petros Fyssoun mainly with Modern Greek works. He participated in an American tour in 1984 along with Giannis Evangelidis and Sperantza Vrana with the play by Giannis Dalianidis Ego psifizo agapi (I Vote for Love). He performed his final performances with the company during the mid-1980s.

He performed in approximately 85 movies. He took part for the first time in film in the movie Koritsi tis tavernas (Κορίτσι της ταβέρνας) by G. Triantafylli. He also played in Fyntanaki (Φυντανάκι) from the same play by Pantelis Horn, A Girl in Black (Κορίτσι με τα μαύρα) by Michalis Kakogiannis, I Odysseia enos xerizomenou (Η Οδύσσεια ενός ξεριζωμένου) by Apostolos Tegopoulos, Battle of Crete by Vassilis Georgiadis, Papaflessa by Errikos Andreou, The Man with the Carnation (Ο άνθρωπος με το γαρύφαλλο) by N. Tzima. Anametrisi (Αναμέτρηση) by Karypidis in 1982, as well as Egklima sto Kolonaki (Έγκλημα στο Κολωνάκι), Santa Chiquita, O atsidas (Ο ατσίδας), Gia mia choufta Touristries (Για μια χούφτα τουρίστριες), etc.

He also acted in television (Police Stories, Eastern Winds). He was one of the popular characters in Greek theater and film, mainly in bitter and unhesitating roles. In his life, he was a calm and mild loving man in all of the split acting. He was the only person that he liked his studies.

He died on Thursday April 6, 2006 at 8:30 in the morning at the Erythros Stavros Hospital (Red Cross) from breathing problems at the age of 83. He was buried on Saturday April 8 in Peristeri.

== Selected filmography ==
- Ena votsalo sti limni (1952) ..... Vangelis
- Despoinis eton 39 (1954) ..... Rokas
- The Girl from Corfu (1956) ..... Angelos
- A Girl in Black (1956) ..... Panagis
- The Auntie from Chicago (1957) ..... Nikos Kadris
- Astero (1959) ..... Thanos
- O atsidas (1962) ..... Antonis Papapoulakis
