= Marialena Oikonomidou =

Greek singer (1957–2024)

- Μαριαλένα Οικονομίδου
- Born: 25 June 1957; Athens, Greece
- Died: 11 June 2024 (aged 67); Athens, Greece
- Occupation: Singer

Marialena Oikonomidou (Greek: Μαριαλένα Οικονομίδου; 25 June 1957 – 11 June 2024) was a Greek singer.

== Biography ==
Oikonomidou was born in 1957 to screenwriter Giorgos Oikonomides and his wife the poet and actress Liana Vitsori. She was born into a family of actors; her maternal grandparents were Giorgis Vitsoris and Nitsa Tsaganea. She started writing music, poetry and lyrics from a young age.

She studied acting at the Pelos Katselis Drama School and directing at the Stavrakos School. She released a total of five albums. In 1991, her album “The Light of My Moon” had self-written lyrics and was produced by Stefanos Korkolis. In July 2023, she organized a large concert at the Alsos Theater in a tribute to her father.

She died on 11 June 2024. She died in hospital where she was undergoing advanced cancer treatment. She was married to Roberto Carriere and they had two children.
