= O periergos =

O periergos Ο περίεργος
- Directed by: Omiros Evstratides
- Written by: Giannis Sklavos
- Starring: Stathis Psaltis; Mimis Fotopoulos; Kaiti Finou; Athinodoros Prousalis; Thanassis Papadopoulos; Vina Assiki; Sofia Hristou; Vassilsi Tsaglos
- Release date: 1982
- Running time: 90 minutes
- Country: Greece
- Language: Greek

O periergos (Greek: Ο περίεργος) is a 1982 Greek comedy film directed by Omiros Evstratides and starring Stathis Psaltis, Mimis Fotopoulos and Kaiti Finou.

== Plot ==
The hotel where Simos (Stathis Psaltis) works confronted problems, in wihc someone sabotaged by actions. Whoever wanted to encounter was Myrto (Kaiti Finou) and the daughter of the same, it holds the secret identity that worked in the reception. From the first moment arrived in clash with Simos.

== Cast ==
- Stathis Psaltis as Simos Aftias
- Mimis Fotopoulos as hotel manager
- Kaiti Finou as Myrto or Mirto
- Athinodoros Prousalis as Megalos
- Thanassis Papadopoulos as Nektarios
- Vina Assiki
- Sofia Hristou
- Vassilis Tsaglos as Stratigos

== Other information ==
- Year: 1982
- Genre: Comedy
- Length: 90 minutes
