= Aleka Stratigou =

Greek actress (1926–1989)

Aleka Stratigou Αλέκα Στρατηγού
- Born: 1926; Athens, Greece
- Died: January 1, 1989 (aged 62–63); Athens, Greece
- Occupation: actress

Alexandra (Aleka) Stratigou (Greek: Αλέκα Στρατηγού; 1926 – 1 January 1989) was a Greek actress. She appeared in theatre, had 61 film and television credits, and was known for her distinctive, characterful voice. She was married to Andreas Barkoulis.She died on 1 January 1989 and was buried in Peristeri.. She was the sister of Stefanos, Stella and Rena.

== Filmography ==
- 1951 Ekeines poy den prepei n' agapoun
- 1956 Tsiganiko aima
- 1957 Tsarouhi, pistoli, papiyion
- 1958 To trelokoritso
- 1958 Diakopes stin Aigina
- 1958 Makria ap' ton kosmo
- 1958 O Mimikos kai h Mairi
- 1958 To koritsi tis amartias
- 1959 Krystallw
- 1959 I moysitsa
- 1959 Oi dosatzides
- 1959 To agorokoritso
- 1959 Erotika skandala
- 1959 Douleis me fountes
- 1959 Enas vlakas kai misos
- 1959 O theios apo ton Kanada
- 1959 O Thymios ta 'kane thalassa
- 1959 Diakopes stin Kolopetinitsa
- 1960 Tsakitzis
- 1960 Agapoula mou
- 1960 Meta tin amartia
- 1960 Erotika paihnidia
- 1960 I kyria dimarxos
- 1960 O Thymios ta 'xei 400
- 1960 To nisi tis agapis
- 1960 Makrykostaioi kai Kontogiwrgides
- 1961 Horis mitera
- 1961 Flogera kai aima
- 1962 O gero-Dimos
- 1962 Prepei na ziseis timia
- 1962 O gampros mou, o dikigoros
- 1963 Ta paidia tis Mantalenas
- 1963 Oi aneidikeytoi / Eytyxws hwris douleia
- 1964 Oi proikothires
- 1964 Nyxtoperpatimata
- 1964 Enas zorikos dekaneas
- 1964 I gefyra tis Eytyxias
- 1964 O Giannis ta 'kane thalassa
- 1965 Rimagmeno spiti
- 1965 Bethoven kai mpoyzoyki
- 1965 Ftwos ekatommyriouxos
- 1965 To romantzo mias kamarieras
- 1967 Oydeis anamartitos
- 1967 I koinwnia mas adikise
- 1967 Praktwr Kitsos kalei Gastouni
- 1968 I thyrwrina
- 1968 Gorgopotamos
- 1969 I Smyrnia
- 1969 Gampros apo ti Gastoyni
- 1970 I sklava
- 1970 I peripterou
- 1970 Enas Kitsos sta mpoyzoykia
- 1971 Katw oi antres
- 1971 Mara i tsigana
- 1971 Ta omorfopaida
- 1971 Mia ntanta kai teza oloi
- 1972 O anthropos roloi
- 1982 O Thanasis kai to katarameno fidi
