= Gia mia choufta Touristries =

Gia mia choufta Touristries Για μια χούφτα Τουρίστριες
- Directed by: Errikos Thalassinos
- Written by: Panos Kontelis
- Starring: Alekos Alexandrakis; Kaiti Papanika; Katerina Gioulaki; Sotiris Moustakas; Stefanos Stratigos
- Music by: Giorgos Katsaros
- Distributed by: Art Films
- Release date: 15 January 1971
- Running time: 80 minutes
- Country: Greece
- Language: Greek

Gia mia choufta Touristries (Greek: Για μια χούφτα Τουρίστριες For A Handful of Women Tourists) is a 1971 Greek comedy film directed by Errikos Thalassinos and starring Alekos Alexandrakis, Kaiti Papanika and Katerina Gioulaki.

== Cast ==
- Alekos Alexandrakis ..... Menelaos
- Kaiti Papanika ..... Helen
- Katerina Gioulaki ..... mayor
- Sotiris Moustakas ..... police captain
- Stefanos Stratigos ..... Peter
- Thodoros Katsadramis ..... Chariton
- Eleni Anousaki ..... Katina
