= Bullets don't come back =

- Directed by: Nikos Foskolos
- Written by: Nikos Foskolos
- Produced by: Finos Film
- Starring: Kostas Kazakos; Angelos Antonopoulos; Mema Stathopoulou
- Cinematography: Nikos Dimopoulos
- Edited by: Petros Lykas
- Music by: Mimis Plessas
- Release date: October 9, 1967
- Running time: 116 minutes
- Country: Greece
- Language: Greek

Bullets don't come back (Greek: Οι Σφαίρες δεν Γυρίζουν Πίσω) is a 1967 Greek adventure drama film written and directed by Nikos Foskolos and starring Kostas Kazakos, Angelos Antonopoulos and Mema Stathopoulou. It is the first film directed by Foskolos, a decision he took after his success writing Blood on the Land. Influenced by Spaghetti Western films, the film is set in the Greek countryside. It won the best music award at the 8th Thessaloniki Film Festival.

== Plot ==
Stathis is a poor farmer, a widower with two children. He is arrested by the police who think he is the leader of a gang that has killed a man and stolen a large amount of money. The robbers think that he took the money from their leader when he died and threaten to kill his sister Pigi if he doesn't tell them where he has hidden it. Stathis escapes from the prison by seducing the warden's mistress in order to save his sister. Police send another prisoner, Tsakos, to capture Stathis, promising to commute his sentence if he captures him. Tsakos captures Stathis who saves his life after Tsakos is bitten by a snake. Tsakos agrees to let Stathis save Pigi and take care of his sons if he returns afterward. Meanwhile, Pigi manages to escape from the robbers and returns to the cabin where Tsakos has bonded with the kids. The robbers pursue her and attack them. Fortunately, Stathis returns in time and with the help of a young brigand who considers it dishonorable to attack a woman defeat and kill the rest of the gang. Tsakos who has fallen in love with Pigi returns to prison to serve the rest of his sentence knowing that someone will wait for him after he is released.

== Cast ==
- Kostas Kazakos as Tsakos
- Angelos Antonopoulos as Stathis Karatasos
- Mema Stathopoulou as Pigi
- Spyros Kalogirou as Tsamis
- Betty Arvaniti as Anaastasia
- Pavlos Liaros
