= Mary Lalopoulou =

Greek actress (1926–1989)

Mary Lalopoulou Μαίρη Λαλοπούλου
- Born: 1926; Greece
- Died: 14 May 1989 (aged 62–63); Greece
- Occupation: Actress

Maria (Mary) Lalopoulou (Greek: Μαίρη Λαλοπούλου; 1926 – 14 May 1989) was a Greek actress. She took part in characteristic roles in several films mainly comedy. She died on 14 May 1989.

== Filmography ==
Year	Film	Transliteration and translation	Role
1952	Ena votsalo sti limni	Ένα βότσαλο στη λίμνη	Veta Skountri
1962	Bitter Life (film)	Πικρή ζωή Pikri zoi	—
1963	Dipsa gia zoi	Δίψα για ζωή Thirsty for Life	Dora
1966	I kiries tis avlis	Οι κυρίες της αυλής	Eleni Kathistou
1966	Jenny-Jenny	-	Diana Kassandri
1967	I ora tis dikaiosynis	Η ώρα της δικαιοσύνης	—
1967	Nychta gamou	Νύχτα γάμου	Aspassia
1967	O ahortagos	Ο αχόρταγος	Aspassia Kapandai
1968	Megales agapes	Μεγάλες αγάπες	—
1968	Brosta sti agchoni	Μπροστά στην αγχόνη	Anna
1971	Epanastatis popolaros	Επαναστάτης ποπολάρος	di Mara
