= Kostas Kazakos =

Greek actor, director, and politician (1935–2022)

- Κώστας Καζάκος
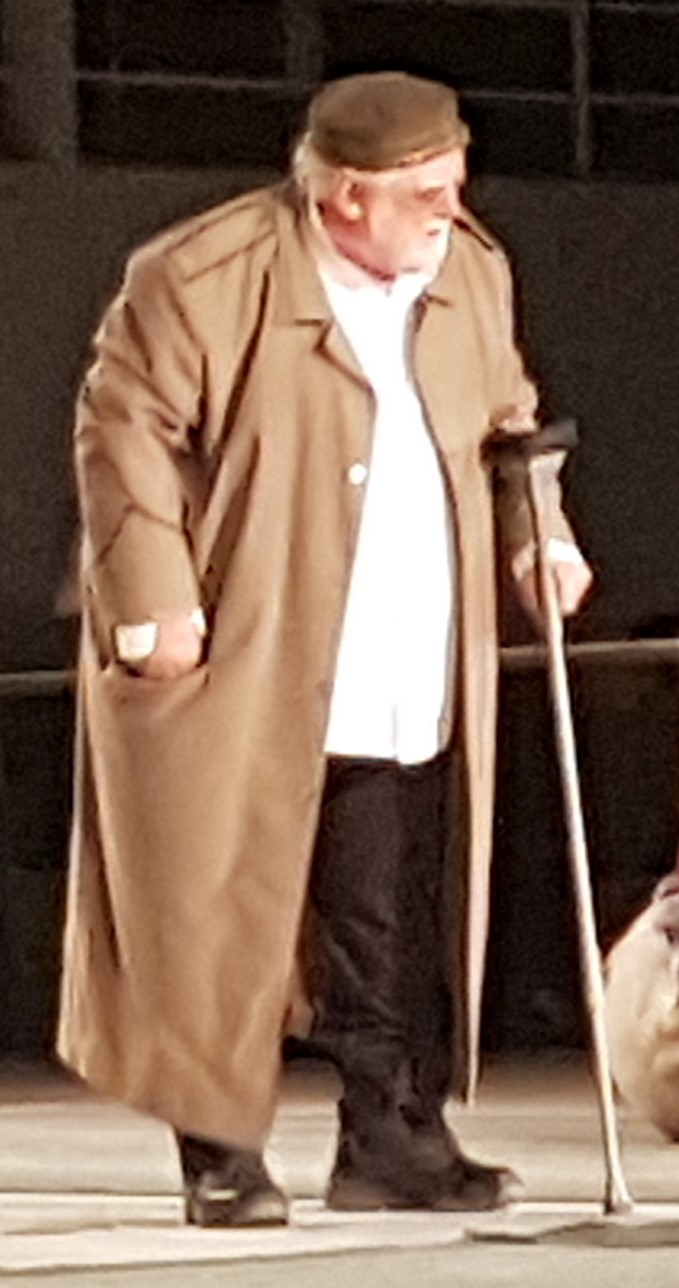
- Kazakos in 2017
- Born: Konstantinos Kazakos; 29 May 1935; Pyrgos, Elis, Greece
- Died: 13 September 2022 (aged 87); Evangelismos Hospital, Athens, Greece
- Occupations: Actor; director; politician
- Years active: 1953–2022
- Political party: Communist Party of Greece
- Spouses: Nerina Lyberopoulou (m. 1962, divorced); Tzeni Karezi (m. 1968; died 1992); Jenny Kollia (m. 1997)
- Children: 5

Member of the Hellenic Parliament for National list
- In office 16 September 2007 – 11 April 2012

Konstantinos "Kostas" Kazakos (Greek: Κωνσταντίνος «Κώστας» Καζάκος; 29 May 1935 – 13 September 2022) was a Greek actor, television director, and politician.

== Early life ==
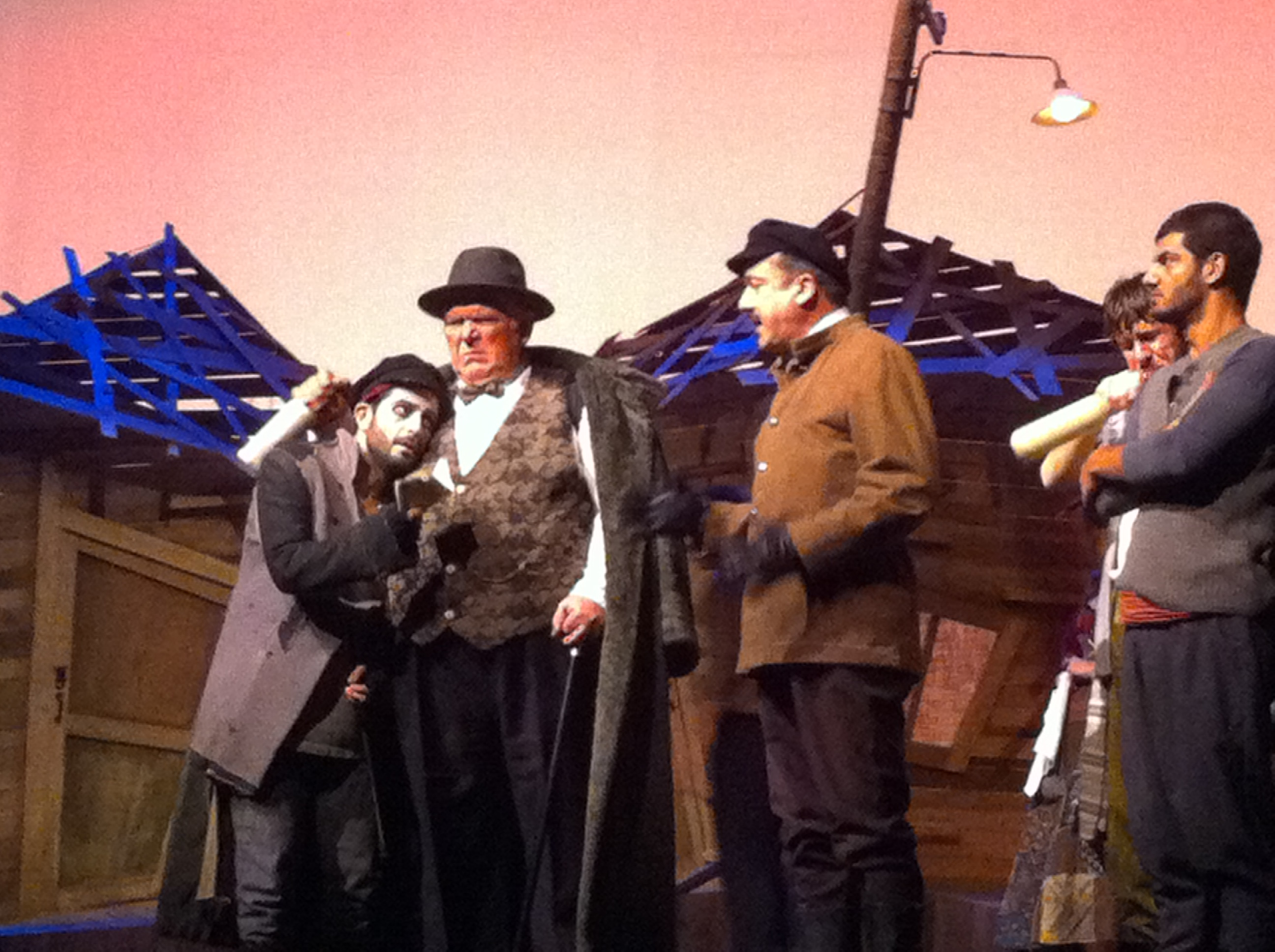
Kazakos playing Mr Puntila at Brecht's epic comedy Mr Puntila and his Man Matti. (National Theater of Northern Greece), 23 December 2010)

Kazakos was born on 29 May 1935, in Pyrgos, Elis, originally from the village of Karyes, Trifylia. At the age of 18, he settled in Athens to study pedagogy, but his father's left-wing heritage caused him to be rejected by the university. Thus, he changed careers and studied at the Lykourgos Stavrakos Film School (1953-1956) and the Karolos Koun Drama School of Art Theater (1954-1957).

== Political career ==
In the 2007 Greek legislative election, he was elected a member of parliament with the Communist Party of Greece, as head of the State Ballot. He was reelected in 2009.

== Personal life ==
He married for the first time in 1962, to the artist Nerina Lyberopoulou (1942–2003), sister of the actress Maya Lyberopoulou. From 1968 to 1992 he was married to actress Tzeni Karezi, with whom he had a son, also an actor Konstantinos Kazakos (b. 1969). From 1997 until his death, he was married to actress Tzeni Kollia, with whom he had four children: Alexander (b. 1997), Artemis-Georgia (1998 - 1999), Electra (b. 2002) and Maya (b. 2008). Artemis-Georgia died on June 25, 1999, aged 8 months and one week after her baptism, suffering from a rare disease.

Kazakos was vice-president of the Hellenic Center of the International Theater Institute, general secretary of the Panhellenic Union of Free Theater and President of the Panhellenic Cultural Movement. Also, he was a founding member of the Hellenic Arab Association and a member of the Actor's Licensing Committee, co-founder of the Free Theatre (together with Leonidas Trivizas) and founder of the Tzeni Karezi Foundation.

=== Death ===
Kazakos continued to act, and be involved in Greek politics until his death. He was infected with COVID-19, which worsened the respiratory problems he already had and was admitted to Evangelismos Hospital on 26 July 2022. He died of multiple organ failure on 13 September 2022, at age 87. Prior to his death, he decided to offer his body after his death to the School of Medicine of National and Kapodistrian University of Athens for the education of students.

== Awards ==
- Golden Apollo for Best Actor, Athens Film Critics Association, 1967
- Thessaloniki Film Festival Award for Best Production for the film adaptation of Lysistrata, 1972

== Selected filmography ==
- Enas delikanis (1963)
- Act of Reprisal (1964)
- Bullets don't come back (1967)
- Iphigenia (1977)
- The Man with the Carnation (1980)
