= Stella Stratigou =

Greek actress (1931–2005)

Stella Stratigou Στέλλα Στρατηγού
- Born: 1931; Athens, Greece
- Died: 9 October 2005 (aged 73–74); Athens, Greece
- Occupation: actress

Stella Stratigou (Greek: Στέλλα Στρατηγού; 1931 – 9 October 2005) was a Greek actress. She played in theatre and films. She died on 9 October 2005. She was the sister of Stefanos, Aleka and Rena.

== Selected filmography ==
Year	Film	Transliteration and translation
1955	The Three Babies	Τα τρία μωρά Ta tria mora
1957	Barba Giannia o Kanatas	Μπαρμπα Γιάννης ο Κανατάς
1957	To koritsi tis ftochogeitonias	Το κορίτσι της φτωχογειτονιάς
1967	Kalos ilthe to dollario	Καλώς ήλθε το δολάριο Welcome the Dollar
