= Rena Stratigou =

Greek actress (1929–2014)

Rena Stratigou Ρένα Στρατηγού
- Born: 1929; Athens, Greece
- Died: March 2014 (aged 84–85); Athens, Greece
- Occupation: actress

Rena (Ourania) Stratigou (Greek: Ρένα (Ουρανία) Στρατηγού; 1929-16 March 2014) was a Greek actress.

== Biography ==
She began her acting career and belonged to her father's family company, Vassilis Stratigos. She was a member of S.E.I. on October 10, 1947. In 1950, she participated with Vebo's company. She played in the helping of Mimis Traiforos-Giorgou Giannakopoulos Vyra tis agkyres. Along with her sisters Aleka and Stella, she sang the famous song in numbers of productions. She did not acted long in theater. During her theatrical years and her transition, she appeared in films including O methystakas (Ο μεθύστακας, 1950), Halima (Χαλιμά, a production of an operetta by Theophrastos Sakellaridis) Oute gata oute zimia (Ούτε γάτα, ούτε ζημιά, a comedy by Alekos Sakellarios-Christos Giannakopoulos), Piassame tin kali (Πιάσαμε την καλή, 1955). She had a small sister, Iklena (Ίκλενα) who died at a young age. She was the sister of Stefanos, Aleka and Stella.

She died in Athens, on 16 March 2014.
