= Stefanos Linaios =

Greek actor (1928–2026)

- Στέφανος Ληναίος
- Born: Dionysios Mytilinaios; 6 August 1928; Messini, Messenia, Greece
- Died: 18 April 2026 (aged 97); Athens, Attica, Greece
- Occupations: Actor, director, comedian, politician
- Years active: 1955–2017
- Notable work: The Kicking Hat, Thanasakis the Politician and People and Little People
- Political party: PASOK
- Spouse: Elli Fotiou (m. 1963)
- Children: 2

Stefanos Linaios (Greek: Στέφανος Ληναίος; born Dionysios Mytilinaios (Διονύσιος Μυτιληναίος); 6 August 1928 – 18 April 2026) was a Greek actor, writer, director, theatrical businessman and politician. He was a member of PASOK and served as an MP for the 1st Athens constituency from 1989 to 1990.

== Early life and career ==
Linaios graduated from the Athens Theatre School in 1951 and from the Royal Academy of Dramatic Art (RADA) in London in 1969. During the period 1954 - 1967 he collaborated with more than 20 troupes in 100 theatrical plays while appearing in 100 films, radio broadcasts and on television. Since 1970, he has directed and participated in 50 plays and many radio and television programs.

He was the founder of the Contemporary Greek Theatre troupe at the Alpha Theatre in Athens. He wrote short stories such as "Some Deaths" and many studies including "Modern Theatre" and "TV as a Means of Education", which was taken into account in the establishment of ERT's educational television.

Linaios served as general secretary of the Greek Actors' Association in 1966–1967, when he was dismissed by the junta due to political views. He was an advisor to the Panhellenic Union of Free Theatre (PEETH) from 1975, and to the Greek Theatre Centre from 1977. Linaios was also a member of the British Actors' Association.

== Personal life and death ==
Linaios was married to the actress Elli Fotiou, with whom he had two children; Margarita (born 1968), for many years director of the Second Program of the Hellenic Radio, and Alexis (born 1970).

Linaios died on 18 April 2026, at the age of 97.

== Filmography ==
- To organaki tou Attik, 1955 – Aristos
- Rantevou me ton erota, 1957 – Alekos
- Mparmpa-Giannis, 1959 – Alexandros Charisis
- O Thisavros tou makariti, 1959 – Hraklis
- To Klotsoskoufi, 1960 – Lakis Aggelidis
- Oikogeneia Papadopoulou, 1960 – Alexis Vranas
- Agapi kai Thiella, 1961 – Tasos Kaftatzis
- Eno sfirize to treno, 1961 – Vasilis Ntanos
- Poia einai h Margarita ?, 1961 – Nikos Pantazis
- Mana mou, ton agapisa, 1961
- Eleftherios Venizelos, 1966 – Afigitis (foni)
- Mias pentaras niata, 1967 – Giorgos Stratakis
- H komissa tis Famprikas, 1969 – Astinomikos Christos Delimanis
- Ta paidia tis Chelonas, 1987
- Kazantzakis, 2017 – Nikos Kazantzakis (old)
