= Vangelis Protopapas =

Greek actor

Vangelis Protopappas Βαγγέλης Πρωτοπαππάς
- Born: 1917; Tinos, Greece
- Died: 21 May 1995 (aged 77–78) suburban Athens, Greece
- Occupation: Actor

Vangelis Protopappas (Greek: Βαγγέλης Πρωτοπαππάς; 1917 – 21 May 1995) was a Greek actor from Messolongi. He is most known for his roles in A Hero in His Slippers, Santa Chikita and The Counterfeit Coin. He later took roles in a number of TV shows including Astynomos Thanassis Papathanassis with Thanassis Vengos and Zoza Metaxa.

== Biography ==
Vangelis Protopappas was from a family with a strong legal history. His father Dimitrios Protopappas was a city judge and a politician. Protopappas died on 21 May 1995 from Alzheimer's disease at the age of 78. He is buried at the Kallithea Cemetery.

== Filmography ==
Year	Film	Transliteration and translation	Role
1959	Marina...	Μαρίνα...	-
1948	The Germans Strike Again	Οι Γερμανοί ξανάρχονται I Yermani xanarhonte	-
1947	Ena votsalo sti limni	Ένα βότσαλο στη λίμνη	Giorgos
1953	Santa Chiquita	Σάντα Τσικίτα	Michalis
1964	Despoinis eton 39	Δεσποινίς ετών 39; A 39-year-old Lady	Kriton Stefanis
1955	I kalpiki lira	Η κάλπικη λίρα	Dinos
1956	O ziliarogatos	Ο ζηλιαρόγατος	Markos Manolopoulos
1957	Delistavros kai yios	Δελησταύρου και υιός	Mikes
1958	A Hero in His Slippers	Ένας ήρως με παντούφλες Enas iros me pantoufles	Liveriadis
1962	O atsidas	Ο ατσίδας	Grigoris Mavrofrydis
1963	Palikarakia tis pantreias	Παλικαράκια της παντρειάς	Orfeas
1966	O kabouris	Ο καμπούρης	Nikos
1986	Alles ton protimoun giouli	Άλλες τον προτιμούν γουλί	Dinos
1990	Prosochi... mas valane boba	Προσοχή... μας βάλανε μπόμπα	-
