= Adamantios Lemos =

Greek actor (1916–2006)

- Born: 13 January 1916; Kardamyla, Chios, Greece
- Died: June 12, 2006 (aged 90)
- Occupation(s): Theatrical producer, actor, scenewriter, theatre teacher and director

Adamantios Lemos (Greek: Αδαμάντιος Λεμός; 13 January 1916 – 12 June 2006) was a Greek actor. He was one of the most influential figures in modern Greek theatre. During his 60-year career, he worked as a theatrical producer, actor, manager, theatrical teacher, director, and clothier.

Lemos worked with several major theater companies, including Kotopouli Company and Katerina, before opening his namesake Lemos Theater in 1944. He led Prometheus Theater, with Tefkros Anthias.

He also visited America, where his first non-Greek play ran from 1957 through 1967.
