= Nikos Rizos =

Greek actor

Nikos Rizos Νίκος Ρίζος
- Born: 30 September 1924; Peta, Greece
- Died: 20 April 1999 (aged 74); Athens, Greece
- Occupation: Actor
- Spouse: Elsa Rizou (née Lampropoulou)
- Children: (1); Konstantinos

Nikos Rizos (Greek: Νίκος Ρίζος; 30 September 1924, in Peta – 20 April 1999, in Athens) was a Greek actor. He took part in many Greek comedies in cinema.

== Career ==
Rizos began his career with Anthropoi, anthropoi in 1948 at the Metropolitan Theatre. He founded his own company in 1959 which he co-ran from 1961 with Vasilis Avlonitis and Georgia Vasileiadou. He appeared in various comedies in Greece and Germany, performing for the immigrant Greeks abroad. In 1986, he appeared at the Astor Theatre on Stadiou Street which he ran from the artistic performance until 1990. Rizos changed and he was a theatrical entrepreneur for 27 years.

He starred in around 300 comedy films including To soferaki (with Giorgos Tzavellas), O thisavros tou makariti (with Nikos Tsiforos), O Klearchos, i Marina kai o kontos, Simoria eraston, and others. On television, he starred alongside Martha Karagianni in O dromos (The Road). In 1999, he appeared in the television series of Tassos Athanassiadis's I aithousa tou thronou. It was his last appearance on television.

== Death ==
Rizos' last years were spent in Gkyzi. He suffered a heart attack on 20 April 1999 and died in an Athens hospital from edema. He was 74 years old. He is buried at Athens First Cemetery. He was survived by his wife, Elsa, with whom he co-starred in approximately 19 films, and his son Konstantinos, born in 1966.

== Filmography ==
Year	Film	Original name and translation	Role
1950	O methystakas	Ο μεθύστακας The drunkard	Mitsos
1952	I Agni tou limaniou	Η Αγνή του λιμανιού Agni of the Port	Atsidas
1953	To soferaki	Το σωφεράκι	Mistos
1954	To pontikaki	Το ποντικάκι The Little Mouse	Vangelis
1954	Oi papatzides	Οι παπατζήδες	-
1954	Haroumeno xekinima	Χαρούμενο ξεκίνημα	-
1955	A Point on Romance	Γκολ στον έρωτα Goal ston erota	Pipis
1955	Kallio arga para pote	Κάλλιο αργά παρά ποτέ	-
1955	Joe the Menace	Τζο ο τρομερός Joe the Menace	Gardelis
1955	Glenti, lefta ki agapi	Γλέντι, λεφτά κι αγάπη	Sarantis
1956	Oi trakadori tis Athinas	Τρακαδόροι της Αθήνας	Lakis
1956	The Girl from Corfu	Πρωτευουσιάνικες περιπέτειες Capital Adventures	cook
1956	Kynigontas ton erota	Κυνηγώντας τον έρωτα The Romances Moves On	Iraklis
1956	Ta kothonia tou Syntagmatos	Τα κωθώνια του Συντάγματος	Nikos from Peireaus
1956	Resident's Office	Γραφείον συνοικεσίων Grafeion synoikession	groom to be
1956	O ziliarogatos	Ο ζηλιαρόγατος	Mistos
1957	Three Detectives	Τρεις ντετέκτιβς Treis Detectives	-
1957	Tis tychis ta grammena	Tης τύχης τα γραμμένα	Billy
1957	To paidi tou dromou	Το παιδί του δρόμου Children of the Road	-
1957	You are doing wrong, daddy	Κατά λάθος μπαμπάς Kata lathos babas	"Shrimp"
1957	Jeep, Kiosk and love	Τζιπ, περίπτερο κι αγάπη Jeep, periptero ki agapi	Vangelis
1958	The Cricket and the Ant	τζίτζικας και ο μέρμηγκας O tzitzikas kai o mermigkas	Evdaimon
1958	Zero-Five	Μηδέν πέντε Miden pende	-
1958	Melpo	Mέλπω	-
1958	Haroumeni alites	Χαρούμενοι αλήτες	Mistos Mandrahaleas
1958	To eispraktoraki	Το εισπρακτοράκι	-
1958	Adekaroi erotevmenoi	Αδέκαροι ερωτευμένοι	Aristotelis
1959	Pos pernoun i pandremenoi	Πώς περνούν οι παντρεμένοι	Mihalis Bosikos
1959	O thisavros tou makariti	*Ο θησαυρός του μακαρίτη	Stelios Prousoglou
1960	Three Girls and Me	Τρεις κούκλες κι εγώ Treis koukles ki ego	Vangelis
1960	Gia tin agapi mias orfanis	Για την αγάπη μιας ορφανής	-
1960	Agapoula mou	Αγαπούλα μου My little love	-
1961	O Klearchos, i Marina ki o kontos	Ο Κλέαρχος, η Μαρίνα κι ο κοντός	Mahos Zarkadopoulos
1961	Flogera kai aima	Φλογέρα και αίμα	Haralambis
1962	O Thymios sti hora tou strip-tease	Ο Θύμιος στη χώρα του στριπτίζ	-
1962	Terma ta difragka	Τέρμα τα δίφραγκα	Napoleon Mavromanikos
1962	The Taxi Driver	Ο ταξιτζής O taxitzis	Babis
1962	Otan leipei i gata	Όταν λείπει η γάτα	Babis
1926	I nyfi to 'skase	Η νύφη το 'σκασε	lorry driver
1962	O Michalios tou 14ou Syntagmatos	Ο Μιχαλιός του 14ου Συντάγματος; Michalios of the 14th Regiment	Menios Tsakalas
1962	Katarammeni genia	Καταραμένη γενιά	-
1926	The Little Watermelon	Το καρπουζάκι	-
1962	I gambri tis Eftychias	Οι γαμπροί της Ευτυχίας	Menios
1962	Exypnoi kai koroida	Έξυπνοι και κορόιδα Expert and Liar	-
1962	The Greek and the Romance	Η Ελληνίδα και ο έρωτας I Elinida ke o erotas	Nikolakis
1963	Seven Days of Jokes	Επτά ημέρες ψέματα Epta meres psemmata	Sotiris
1963	Enas vlakas me patenta	Ένας βλάκας με πατέντα	Tonis
1963	Evtychos choris douleia	Ευτυχώς χωρίς δουλειά Lucky Without Work	Stratos Katsavidas
1963	My Cousin Manolis	Ο ανιψιός μου ο Μανόλης; O anipsios mou o Manolis	Manolis Karletsos
1963	My Brother the Traffic Officer	Ο αδερφός μου ο τροχονόμος O aderfos mou o trochonomos	Lambros Stroungos
1964	I prikothires	Οι προικοθήρες The fortune hunters	Sophocles
1964	My Bitter Love	Πικρή μου αγάπη Pikri mou agapi	-
1964	We Were All Liars	Ήταν όλοι τους κορόιδα Itan oli tous koroida	Irekleas Karabinas
1964	If You Have Any Luck	Αν έχεις τύχη An ehis tihi	Pelopidas Zarmis
1965	No, Mr. Johnson	Όχι, κύριε Τζόνσον; Ohi, kirie Johnson	Thanasis
1965	Make Me Prime Minister	Κάνε με πρωθυπουργό Kane me prothopourgo	Andreas Zangalos
1965	Ena exypno exypno moutro	Ένα Έξυπνο Έξυπνο Μούτρο	Iordanis
1965	Dichasmos	Διχασμός	Mikes
1977	I vouleftina	Η βουλευτίνα	Filimon
1966	O tetraperatos	Ο τετραπέρατος	Hatzifotias
1966	Foukarades kai leftades	Φουκαράδες και λεφτάδες	Nondas Paraskevas
1966	Ah! Kai na 'moun antras	Αχ! Και να 'μουν άντρας	Pavlos
1966	I aderfi mou thelei xylo	Η αδερφή μου θέλει ξύλο	Gerasimos
1967	Viva Rena	Βίβα Ρένα	Stratos Fafalios
1967	Ta dollaria tis Aspasias	Τα δολάρια της Ασπασίας	Michel
1968	Dimitri mou... Dimitri mou	Δημήτρη μου... Δημήτρη μου	-
1968	O tiherakias	Ο τυχεράκιας	Stavros
1968	Psihremia, Napoleon	Ψυχραιμία, Ναπολέων	Leonidas
1968	O kouklos	Ο κούκλος	Alexis
1968	A Girl at the Amusement Park	Το κορίτσι του λούνα παρκ To koritsi tou louna park	Stelios
1968	O gigas tis Kypselis	Ο γίγας της Κυψέλης	Nikos Fourketas
1969	O boufos	Ο μπούφος	Max Ralatos
1969	O tzanabetis	Ο τζαναμπέτης	Tolis Zerzebekis
1969	O Stratis parastratise	Ο Στρατής παραστράτησε	Jim Andrews Andreopoulos
1969	I komissa tis fabrikas	Η κόμισσα της φάμπρικας	Christos Delimanis
1969	I arhontissa ke o alitis	Η αρχόντισσα και ο αλήτης	Thanasis
1969	O anthropos tis karpazias	Ο άνθρωπος της καρπαζιάς	Aristos
1969	To afentiko mou itan koroido	Το αφεντικό μου ήταν κορόιδο	Theodoros Kotronis
1970	I taxitzou	Η ταξιτζού	Anastasis
1970	O Nanos kai i Epta Hionates	Ο Νάνος και οι Επτά Χιονάτες; Nanos and the Seven Dwarves	Thanassis Debesis
1971	Ethelontis ston erota	Εθελοντής στον έρωτα	Ilias Fontoglou
1972	Symmoria eraston	Συμμορία εραστών	Georgis Kotsiras
1972	Ap' t' alonia sta salonia	Απ' τ' αλώνια στα σαλόνια	Fondas
1972	I Aliki diktator	Η Αλίκη δικτάτωρ Aliki the dictator	Panagos
1972	Agapi mou paliogria	Αγάπη μου παλιόγρια	Minas
1973	Ton arapi ki an to pleneis	Τον αράπη κι αν τον πλένεις	Giorgis
1973	Enas trelos, trelos aeropeiratis	Ένας τρελός, τρελός αεροπειρατής A crazy, crazy hijacker	Fanis Fourlis
1979	Ta paidia tis piatsas	Τα παιδιά της πιάτσας Friends of the Square	Babis Papalaourdas
1980	Xevrakotos Romios	Ξεβράκωτος Ρωμηός; The Naked	-
1980	Mandepse ti kano ta vradia	Μάντεψε τι κάνω τα βράδια Guess what I'm doing at night	Sotiris
1980	Enas exypnos Romios	Ένας έξυπνος Ρωμηός; A Brilliant Romeo	-
1981	A Short Man that Survives	Ένας κοντός θα μας σώσει	Fondas Tsakiris
1982	Roda, tsanta kai kopana	Ρόδα, τσάντα και κοπάνα	Iraklis Derekis
1982	Arpa kola	Άρπα κόλα	Karalefiotis
1983	Roda, tsanta kai kopana( No) 2	Ρόδα, τσάντα και κοπάνα No 2	Iraklis Derekis
1983	O papasouzas	Ο παπασούζας	Padre-Augustos
1983	Papadistiki kobania	Παπαδίστικη κομπανία	-
1983	Gyftiki kobania	Γύφτικη κομπανία A Gypsy Company	-
1983	Doste tin stonta sto lao	Δώστε την τσόντα στο λαό	Vangelis
1983	Agris plakes sta thrania	Άγριες πλάκες στα θρανία	headmaster
1984	Roda, tsanda kai kopana 3	Ρόδα, τσάντα και κοπάνα No 3	Iraklis Derekis
1984	Radio-arvila	Ράδιο-αρβύλα	officer
1984	Mitsos, o rezilis	Μήτσος, ο ρεζίλης	Leras
1984	Kai klaaaaama sta scholeia	Και κλααααάμα στα σχολεία	-
1984	O glykopseftis	Ο γλυκοψεύτης	Leras
1984	Enas protaris sto kollegio	Ένας πρωτάρης στο κολέγιο	Nikos Pitsoulas
1985	Mia nyfi gia olous	Μια νύφη για όλους	-
1985	Kokoras sto haremi tou	Κόκορας στο χαρέμι του	-
1985	A Cobra from Giannena	Η Κόμπρα από τα Γιάννενα; I Kompra apo ta Giannena	Cobras
1986	The Barbarian and Barbara	Ο Βάρβαρος και η Βαρβάρα	Nondas
1986	I erotiarides i	Οι ερωτιάρηδες	-
1986	Gata o kontos	Γάτα ο κοντός	-
1986	Ena koritsi kai poly andraki	Ένα κορίτσι και πολύ αντράκι	Mitsos
1986	Giannakis o provlimatikos	Γιαννάκης ο προβληματικός	-
1987	Ine o magas o psilos me ti gravata	Είναι ο μάγκας ο ψηλός με τη γραβάτα (video release only)	-
1988	Mas fagane oi treles stis Seychelles	Μας φάγανε οι τρέλες στις Σεϋχέλλες; We are Eaten by Cowards from the Seychelles	Spekoulas
1988	O kondos ke o mnistires	Ο κοντός και οι μνηστήρες	-
1988	O doktor kis kompinas	Ο δόκτωρ της κομπίνας	-
1988	O kontos nw to papaki	Ο κοντός με το παπάκι	-
1989	Ah! kai na 'moun gkomenos	Αχ! και να 'μουν γκόμενος	-
1995	Alli to proi, alli to vrady	Άλλη το πρωί, άλλη το βράδυ	-
1998	I aithousa tou thronou	Η αίθουσα του θρόνου	Tagmatarchis

As himself:

Year	Film	Transliteration and translation
1962	Athens By Night	Η Αθήνα τη νύχτα I Athina ti nychta
1968	Athens After Midnight	Αθήνα μετά τα μεσάνυχτα Athina meta ta mesanychta
