= Dead Man's Treasure =

Dead Man's Treasure Ο θησαυρός του μακαρίτη O thisavros tou makariti
- Directed by: Nikos Tsiforos
- Written by: Nikos Tsiforos (play, uncredited for screenplay); Polivios Vasileiadis (play and screenplay)
- Produced by: Finos Film
- Starring: Georgia Vasileiadou; Vasilis Avlonitis; Nikos Rizos; Xenia Kalogeriopoulou; Stefanos Linaios; Antzela Zilia
- Cinematography: Nikos Dimopoulos; Yiannis Hatzopoulos
- Edited by: Giorgos Tsaoulis
- Music by: Takis Morakis
- Release date: 12 October 1959
- Running time: 89 minutes
- Country: Greece
- Language: Greek

O thisavros tou makariti (Greek: Ο θησαυρός του μακαρίτη) or Dead Man's Treasure is a 1959 Greek comedy film produced by Finos Film. Based on a play written by Nikos Tsiforos and Polivios Vasileiadis, it was one of the last films Tsiforos directed for Finos and was regarded as some of their best work. Georgia Vasileiadou, Vasilis Avlonitis, Nikos Rizos, and Stefanos Linaios featured in the film. The story drew on the development of polykatoikla (roughly translated as many modern dwellings) apartments that occurred in Athens in the post-World War II era as a setting to explore women using their poniria (craftiness or guile) as a means to get things done.

The film was one of Filos Film's most successful in its first 15 years with the talents of the comic duo of Avlonitis-Vasileiadou and Nikos Rizos. Building on their success, the pair formed the "Avlonitis-Vassiliadou-Rizos" company two years later, which received awards in the first half of the 1960s. The film also included Xenia Kalogeropoulou, recently arrived from studies in England, singer Antzela Zilia, and actress and a young celebrity Stefanos Linaios. Georgia Vasileiadou sang the song O kir Mendios (Ο κυρ Μέντιος) and it is the first time she sings on screen, despite the fact that she began her career as an opera singer.

== Plot ==
A cunning widow and her niece live in a very old house which they inherited from her husband. By spreading rumours of a treasure chest with a huge fortune hidden in the house, the women are able to rent out several rooms to treasure-hunters. A builder attempts to manipulate the woman into selling the "worthless" house, while she manipulates the builder and the new tenants into damaging the house so she can force modern refurbishments for the house. The tenants and builder become involved in a tangled web of love, lies, and emotional entanglements building to the happy ending.

== Cast ==
- Georgia Vasileiadou as Theoni Kanelopiperidou
- Vasilis Avlonitis as Neokosmos
- Nikos Rizos as Stelios Prousoglou
- Xenia Kalogeropoulou as Loukia Kanelopiperidou
- Stefanos Linaios as Iraklis
- Antzela Zilia as Dolly Roza
- Takis Christoforidis
- Giorgos Lefteriotis as Vasos
- Nikos Fermas as Thanasis
- Giannis Vogiatzis as lawyer
