= List of Greek films =

A list of the most notable films produced in the Cinema of Greece ordered split by year and decade of release on separate pages. For an alphabetical list of articles on Greek films see Category:Greek films.

== Pre-1940 ==
- Golfo, 1914
- Maria i Pentagiotissa / Μαρία η Πενταγιώτισσα, 1928
- Oi apachides ton Athinon / Οι Απάχηδες των Αθηνών, 1930
- Agapitikos tis voskopoulas / Ο Αγαπητικός της βοσκοπούλας, 1932

== 1950s ==
- O methystakas / Ο μεθύστακας (The Drunkard), George Tzavellas, 1950
- Kyriakatiko xypnima / Κυριακάτικο Ξύπνημα (Windfall in Athens), Michael Cacoyannis, 1954
- To pontikaki / Το Ποντικάκι (The little mouse), Nikos Tsiforos, 1954
- Ι Kalpiki lira / Η Κάλπικη λίρα (The Counterfeit Coin), George Tzavellas, 1955
- Stella / Στέλλα, Michael Cacoyannis, 1955
- Μαγική Πόλις / Magiki Polis (Magic City), 1955
- Η Αρπαγή της Περσεφόνης / I Arpagi tis Persefonis, 1956
- A Girl in Black / Το Κορίτσι με τα Μαύρα, Michael Cacoyannis, 1956
- Ο Δράκος / O Drakos, 1956
- Μαζί σου για πάντα / Mazi sou gia Panta (Beside You Forever), 1956
- Πρωτευουσιάνικες περιπέτειες / Protevousianikes Peripeteies, 1956
- To koritsi me ta paramythia / Το κορίτσι με τα παραμύθια, 1956
- Maria i Pentagiotissa / Μαρία Πενταγιώτισσα, 1957
- Θέμα Τιμής / To Telefteo psemma (A Matter of Dignity), Michael Cacoyannis, 1957
- Έχει Θείο το Κορίτσι/Echei Theio to Koritsi, 1957
- Ο Γυναικάς/O Gynaikas (The Ladies man), 1957
- Ο Μεγαλοκαρχαρίας/O Megalokarcharias, 1957
- Erotas stous ammolofous / Έρωτας στους αμμόλοφους = Love in the dunes, 1958
- O Mimikos kai i Mairi / Ο Μιμίκος και η Μαίρη, 1958
- Charoumeni Alites / Χαρούμενοι Αλήτες, 1958
- Diakopes stin Aegina / Διακοπές στην Αίγινα, 1958
- Mia laterna, Mia Zoi / Μια λατέρνα, Μια Ζωή (Sokrates Kapsaskis), 1958
- O Leftas / Ο Λεφτάς, 1958
- O Misogynis / Ο Μισογύνης, 1958
- We Have Only One Life / Μια ζωή την έχουμε (Mia Zoi tin Échome), 1958
- Astero / Αστέρω, 1959
- Dada me to zori / Νταντά με το ζόρι, 1959
- I Liza to' skase / Η Λίζα το’σκασε ([Lisa, Tosca of Athens, USA] [Lisa, the Greek Tosca, UK]) (Sokrates Kapsaskis), 1959
- Η Ζαβολιάρα / I Zaboliara, 1959
- Erotikes Istories (Sokrates Kapsaskis) / Ερωτικές Ιστορίες, 1959
- Moussitsa / Μουσίτσα, 1959
- Ο θησαυρός του μακαρίτη / O thisavros tou makariti (Dead Man's Treasure), 1959
- Xylo vyge apo ton paradeiso / Το Ξύλο βγήκε από τον Παράδεισο, 1959

== 1960s ==
- Madalena / Μανταλένα, 1960
- To Klotsoskoufi / Το Κλωτσοσκούφι, 1960
- Ηλέκτρα/Electra Michael Cacoyannis, 1961
- Αγάπη και Θύελλα/Agapi kai Thiela (Sokrates Kapsaskis), 1961
- Η Αλίκη στο Ναυτικό/I Aliki sto Naftiko (Alice in the Navy), Alekos Sakellarios, 1961
- Χαμένα Όνειρα/Chamena Oneira, 1961
- Η Λίζα και Η Άλλη/Liza kai I Alli, Dinos Dimopoulos, 1961
- Ο Κατήφορος/O Katiphoros, 1961
- Το Παιδί του μεθύστακα/To Paidi tou methistaka, 1961
- Amartisa gia to Paidi (Αμάρτησα για το παιδί μου), 1962
- Merikoi to Protimoun Kryo (Μερικοί το προτιμούν κρύο) = Many Choose Cold, 1962
- Odo Oneiron (Οδό ονείρων) = Dream Street, 1962
- Otan Leipei I Gata (Όταν λείπει η γάτα), 1962
- Siralardaki heyecanlar, 1963
- Chtipokardia sto thranio / Χτυποκάρδια στο θρανίο, 1963
- Δίψα για Ζωή /Dipsa gia Zoi = Thirst for Life (Sokrates Kapsaskis), 1963
- Ένα Κορίτσι για δύο/Ena Koritsi Gia Dyo, 1963
- Κάτι να καίει/Kati Na Kaiei = Something is Burning, 1963
- Η Ψεύτρα/I Pseftra, Yannis Dalianidis, 1963
- Αλίκη αγάπη μου/Aliki My Love, Rudolph Maté, 1963
- Τα Κόκκινα Φανάρια/The Red Lanterns, Vassilis Georgiadis, 1963
- Lola / Λόλα, 1964
- Ζορμπάς ο Έλληνας/Zorba the Greek, Michael Cacoyannis, 1964 English language
- Άπονη Ζωή/Aponi Zoi, 1964
- Η Σωφερίνα/I Soferina. Alekos Sakellarios, 1964
- O Polytechnos, 1964
- Οι Αστεφάνωτοι/Oi Astefanoti, 1964
- Το Δόλωμα/To Doloma, Alekos Sakellarios, 1964
- Κορίτσια για φίλημα/Koritsia Gia Filima, 1964
- O Megalos Orkos, 1965
- Moderna stachtopouta / Μοντέρνα σταχτοπούτα, 1965
- Afisea Me Na Zizo / Αφήστε με να ζήσω, 1965
- Δύσκολοι Δρόμοι/Diskoloi Dromoi, 1965
- Ο Νικητής/O Nikitis (The Victor), 1965
- Oi Timoria, 1965
- Περάστε Την Πρώτη Του Μηνός/Peraste tin proti tou minos, Sokrates Kapsaskis, 1965
- Πικρή Ζωή / Pikri Zoi, Sokrates Kapsaskis, 1965
- I kori mou i Sosialistria / Η κόρη μου η Σοσιαλίστρια = My daughter the Socialist, 1966
- Αδικία/Adikia, 1966
- Έχω δικαίωμα να σ' αγαπώ / Eho dikaioma na s'agapo (Apostolos Tegopoulos), 1966
- Ζεστός μήνας Αύγουστος / Hot Month of August (Zestos minas Augoustos) (Sokrates Kapsaskis), 1966
- Η Αρτίστα / i Artista (The Artist), 1966
- Ματωμένη Γη / Matomeni Gi, 1967
- Ο Προδότης / O Prodotis, 1967
- Η Γόησσα / I Goissa, 1967
- Η Ώρα της Δικαιoσύνης / Ora tis Dikaiosynis, 1967
- Πάρε Κόσμε / Pare Kosme, 1967
- Βίβα Ρένα / Viva Rena, 1967
- Giga tis Kypselis, 1968
- Ο Αλύγιστος / O Aligistos, 1968
- I Theia Mou I Chipissa / Η θεία μου η χίπισσα, 1968
- Mia Treli Sarantara / Μια τρελή σαραντάρα = One Crazy 40-year old, 1968
- Ο Παλιάτσος / O Paliatsos, 1968
- Ζηλιάρα / Ziliara, 1968
- Z (Costa-Gavras), 1969
- Αγωνία / Agonia, 1969
- Ο Άνθρωπος της Καρπαζιάς / O Anthropos tis Karpazias, 1969
- I Thissia Mias Ginekas / Η θυσία μιας γυναίκας = The sacrifice of a woman, 1969
- Pariziana / Παριζιάνα, 1969
- Το Τελευταίο Αντίο / To Teleftaio andeio, 1969

== 1970s ==
- Reconstitution, 1970
- Υπολοχαγός Νατάσσα/Ipolochagos Natassa, 1970
- Mia Ellinida Sto Charemi/Ελληνίδα στο χαρέμι, 1970
- Ο Δοσίλογος/O Dosilogos, 1970
- Ziteitai Epeigontos Gempros/Ζητείται επειγόντως γαμπρός, 1970
- Ευδοκία/Evdokia, 1971
- Η Κόρη του Ήλιου/Kori tou heliou, 1971
- Η Αλίκη Δικτάτωρ/I Aliki dictator (Takis Vougiouklakis), 1972
- The Countess of Corfu (Η κόμησσα της Κέρκυρας I Komissas tis Kerkyras), 1972
- I Rena Einai Ofsaid/Offside (Η Ρένα είναι οφσάιντ) = Rena Is Offside, 1972
- Maris tis Siopis / Μαρία της σιωπής, 1973
- O Tsarlatanos / Ο Τσαρλατάνος, 1973
- Attila 74 (Michael Cacoyannis), 1974
- Θίασος/The Travelling Players (Theo Angelopoulos), 1975
- Fantarines/Φανταρίνες, 1979
- Lysistrati '79/Λυσιστράτη '79 = Lysistrates '79, 1979

== 1980s ==
- Rena Na I Efkairia/Ρένα να η ευκαιρία, 1980
- Tis Politismas To Kagkelo/Της πολιτσμάνας το κάγκελο, 1981
- I Manoulam To Manouli Ki O Paidaros/Η μανούλα, το μανούλι κι ο παίδαρος, 1982
- I Sidira Kyria/Η σιδηρά κυρία, 1983
- Rena Ta Resta Sou/Ρένα τα ρέστα σου = Rena Your Change, 1985
- Τοπίο στην Ομίχλη/Landscape in the Mist Τοπίο στην ομίχλη (Theo Angelopoulos), 1988

== 1990s ==
- Το βλέμμα του/Ulysses' Gaze Οδυσσέα (Theo Angelopoulos), 1997
- Μία Αιωνιότητα και μία Ημέρα/Eternity and a Day, 1998
- Earth and Water, Panos Karkanevatos, 1999

== 2000s ==
- The Attack of the Giant Mousaka, 2000
- Safe Sex, 2000
- Risoto, Olga Malea, 2000
- Crying... Silicon Tears (To Klama Vgike Apo ton Paradeiso), Michalis Reppas - Thanassis Papathanasiou, 2001
- Dekapentaugoustos, Constantine Giannaris, 2002
- Πολίτικη Κουζίνα/A Touch of Spice (Tassos Boulmetis), 2003
- Nyfes, Pantelis Voulgaris, 2004
- Hardcore, Denis Iliadis, 2004
- Loafing and Camouflage: Sirens in the Aegean (Loufa kai Paralagh: Seirines sto Agaio), Nikos Perakis, 2005
- Loukoumades me Meli, Olga Malea, 2005
- H Chorodia tou Charitona, Grigoris Karantinakis, 2005
- 5 Lepta akoma, Giannis Xanthopoulos, 2006
- Omiros, Constantine Giannaris, 2005
- The Straight Story, Kostas Kapakas, 2006
- Mia Melissa ton Augousto, Thodoris Atheridis, 2007
- Alter Ego, Nikos Dimitropoulos, 2007
- El Greco, Yannis Smaragdis, 2007
- Gia Proti Fora Nonos, Olga Malea, 2007
- Molis Horisa, Vasilis Myrianthopoulos, 2007
- Afstiros katallilo, Michalis Reppas - Thanassis Papathanasiou, 2008
- The wedding party, Christine Crokos, 2008
- Dogtooth (Kynodontas), Yorgos Lanthimos, 2009
- Evil, in the time of heroes, Giorgos Nousias, 2009
- Guilt, Vassilis Mazomenos, 2009
- Pethainw gia sena Nikos Karapanayiotis, 2009
- Nisos, Christos Dimas, 2009
- S.E.X. Soula Ela Xana, Vasilis Myrianthopoulos, 2009
- Strella, Panos H. Koutras, 2009

== 2010s ==
- Attenberg, 2010 Athina Tsagari
- 45 squares / 45 τετράγωνα, 2010
- I love Karditsa / I love Καρδίτσα, 2010
- Wog Boy 2: Kings of Mykonos, 2010
- Dangerous cooking / Επικίνδυνες μαγειρικές, 2010
- The uprising of Red Mary / Η ανταρσία της Κόκκινης Μαρίας, 2010
- Machairovgaltis, Μαχαιροβγάλτης, 2010 Yiannis Economides
- Four black suits / Τέσσερα μαύρα κουστούμια, 2010
- Alps, 2011 Yorgos Lanthimos
- Christmas Tango, 2011
- The City of Children, 2011
- Debtocracy, 2011
- Unfair World, 2011 Fillipos Tsitos
- J.A.C.E., 2011 Menelaos Karamagiolis
- Man at Sea, 2011
- Magic Hour, 2011
- Paradise, 2011
- Red Sky, 2011
- Super Demetrios, 2011
- What if..., 2012
- Little England, 2013 Pantelis Voulgaris
- Miss Violence, 2013
- September, 2013
- The Eternal Return of Antonis Paraskevas, 2013
- To Mikro Psari, Yannis Economides, 2014
- The Lobster, Yorgos Lanthimos, 2015
- Worlds Apart, Christoforos Papakaliatis, 2015
- Polyxeni (2017)

== 2020s ==
- Apples (2020)
- Digger (2020)
- Magnetic Fields (2022)
- Behind the Haystacks (2022)
- Eftihia (2019)
- Φόνισσα (2023)
- Καθαρτήριο (2023)
- Εξέλιξη (2023)
- Φαντάσματα της Επανάστασης (2023)

== See also ==
- List of Cypriot films
- Cinema of Greece
- Cinema of Cyprus
