= The Girl from Corfu =

1956 film

- Film poster
- Directed by: Yannis Petropoulakis
- Written by: Ilias Lyberopoulos
- Starring: Rena Vlahopoulou
- Cinematography: Basil Maros
- Release date: 1956
- Running time: 81 minutes
- Country: Greece
- Language: Greek

The Girl from Corfu (Greek: Πρωτευουσιάνικες περιπέτειες, translit. Protevousianikes peripeteies) is a 1956 Greek comedy film directed by Yannis Petropoulakis. It was entered into the 7th Berlin International Film Festival.

== Plot ==
A wealthy businessman invites his two nieces to travel from the rustic island of Corfu to stay with him in Athens. Unbeknownst to them, he plans to marry the older one off to another wealthy businessman. She has her own mind, however, and falls in love with her uncle's chauffeur who was tasked with introducing her to city life. Her younger sister provides comic relief by flirting with the male servants in the house.

== Cast ==
- Rena Vlahopoulou - Rinoula
- Stephanos Stratigos - Angelos
- Stavros Iatridis
- Annie Ball - Marietta
- Popi Alva - Georgia
- Nikos Rizos - Thodoris
- Koulis Stoligas - Georges
- Vasilis Andreopoulos - Johnny
- Periklis Christoforidis - police captain
