= To pontikaki =

- Directed by: Nikos Tsiforos
- Written by: Nikos Tsiforos, Giorgos Assimakopoulos
- Produced by: Anzervos
- Starring: Aliki Vougiouklaki; Dionyssis Papayannopoulos; Nikos Rizos; Mimis Fotopoulos; Konstantinos Pappas; Rika Dialina; Periklis Christoforides
- Music by: Argyris Kounadis
- Distributed by: Finos Films
- Release date: February 15, 1954
- Running time: 85 minutes
- Country: Greece
- Language: Greek

To pontikaki (Greek: Το ποντικάκι, "the little mouse"), also To pondikaki, is a 1954 Greek crime film directed by Nikos Tsiforos and starring Aliki Vougiouklaki, Dionyssis Papayannopoulos and Nikos Rizos.

== Synopsis ==
Loukis after his lucky breaky up and decided to resign from the police, his luck on the young florist Krinio in which she was known as The Little Mouse. They took along the hiding place in which they live with Vangelis, Christina and the leader of the council Kostas. Loukis willed to overcome his costly road and they rented a bedroom. They tried to return to his life especially The Little Mouse. The same was also done by Petros. Kostas was not disposed and made much difficult for the damaging his team.

== Cast ==
- Aliki Vougiouklaki ..... Krinoula
- Giorgos Lefteriotis ..... Loukis
- Dionyssis Papayannopoulos ..... Kostas
- Nikos Rizos ..... Vangelis
- Mimis Fotopoulos ..... Babis
- Konstandinos Pappas ..... police captain
- Rika Dialina
- Periklis Christoforidis

== Other information ==
- Genre: Police comedy
- Colour: black and white
- Tickets: 32,558
- Photographic manager: Kostas Theodoridis

== Critics ==
- Apogevmatini praised the movie as a great movie.

== Police movies in Greece ==
The movie hides historically importance as the first police production in Greece in an era on the screen, as the police movies was thought as a cheap entrance.
