= Lavrentis Dianellos =

Greek actor

Lavrentis Dianellos Λαυρέντης Διανέλλος
- Born: Lavrentios Dianellos; 1911; Agios Lavrentios, Magnisia, Greece
- Died: 16 September 1978 (aged 67); Seattle, Washington, United States
- Spouse: Froso Kokola

Lavrentis Dianellos (Greek: Λαυρέντης Διανέλλος; 1911 – 16 September 1978) was a Greek actor. From 1948 to 1975, he appeared in 200 films, leading one reviewer to call him "ubiquitous."

== Indicative filmography ==
- The Germans Strike Again (1948) .... Lefteris
- The Counterfeit Coin (1958) .... Uncle Fotis
- A Hero in His Slippers (1958) .... Apostolos Dekavallas
- We Have Only One Life (1958) .... Anastassis
- The Policeman of the 16th Precinct (1959) .... Mastrolavrentis
- Eglima sta paraskinia (1960)
- Madalena (1960) .... Kapetan Kosmas
- The Downhill (1961) .... Sotiris Siakas
- Law 4000 (1962) .... Lefteris
- Voitheia! O Vegos faneros praktor 000 (1967) .... Mr. Psaltis
- Agonia (1969)
