= The Counterfeit Coin =

- Directed by: Yorgos Javellas
- Written by: Yorgos Javellas
- Starring: Vassilis Logothetidis; Ilia Livykou; Mimis Fotopoulos; Sperantza Vrana; Orestis Makris; Maria Kalamioti; Ellie Lambeti; Dimitris Horn
- Narrated by: Dimitris Myrat
- Cinematography: Kostas Theodoridis; Giorgos Tsaoulis
- Edited by: Giorgos Tsaoulis
- Music by: Manos Hatzidakis
- Production company: Anzervos Productions
- Distributed by: Atlantic Films
- Release date: 28 December 1955
- Running time: 127 minutes
- Country: Greece
- Language: Greek

The Counterfeit Coin (Greek: Ιστορία μιας κάλπικης λίρας, romanized: Istoria mias kalpikis liras, lit. 'Story of a fake pound'; also Η κάλπικη λίρα, I kalpiki lira, "the fake pound") is a Greek comedy-drama film, produced in 1955, written and directed by Giorgos Tzavellas and starring Dimitris Horn, Ilia Livykou and Vassilis Logothetidis. At the 2006 International Thessaloniki Film Festival, the film was announced as among the 10 all-time best Greek films by the PHUCC (Pan-Hellenic Union of Cinema Critics).

== Plot ==
An honest, reserved goldsmith and engraver, Anargyros Loumbardopoulos (Vassilis Logothetidis), has routinely invested his money in gold coins, specifically British gold sovereigns, bought from a friend of his, a banker. Upon having stored away 100 sovereigns, a man working for the banker suggests that Anargyros should start minting counterfeit sovereigns, but he adamantly refuses.

The banker employee then introduces Anargyros to a divorced attractive lady, Fifi (Ilya Livykou) that he knows. Anargyros' resistance is soon curbed by Fifi's sexual means, and he spends all his invested 100 sovereigns to buy minting equipment. After much toil the trio produce their first counterfeit coin, but Anargyros finds it difficult to deceive people into accepting it as currency. People easily understand it is not a genuine coin.

When the sinister employee is arrested, Anargyros fears that the police has discovered their crime and panics. He gets rid of all the counterfeiting equipment, and also abandons Fifi. It is eventually revealed that it was a misunderstanding and the employee was arrested for other reasons. Safe again, Anargyros returns to his honest work and daily routine.

Anargyros tries to get rid of the counterfeit coin, by giving it away as charity to an apparently blind beggar. The beggar sees through the deceit, but Anargyros flees in a hurry. The beggar (Mimis Fotopoulos) is in fact a cunning liar with exceptional eyesight, who manages to earn the pity of everyone with his fake blindness. But a street prostitute, Maria (Sperantza Vrana) starts hooking up near the beggar's corner and they find themselves arguing.

== Cast ==
- Vassilis Logothetidis as Anargyros Loubardopoulos
- Ilia Livykou as Fifi
- Mimis Fotopoulos as the beggar
- Sperantza Vrana as Maria
- Orestis Makris as Vasilis Mavridis
- Maria Kalamioti as Fanitsa
- Ellie Lambeti as Aliki
- Dimitris Horn as Pavlos

Additional cast

- Lavrentis Dianellos as Anastasis
- Vagelis Protopapas as Dinos
- Lela Patrikiou as Mrs. Mavridou
- Dimitris Myrat as the narrator
- Zoras Tsapelis as Dimitris
- Thanos Tzeneralis as George Phil

== Reception ==
As part of the closing night event at the Antipodes Greek Film Festival 2005 in Melbourne, Australia, they screened what they considered a classic 50’s film, The Counterfeit Coin in celebration of the film's 50th anniversary. At the festival, it was said of the film that it was, "Considered by many to be the best Greek film ever produced..." and "There is no more complete Greek cinematic creation". And after the festival, "The standout favourites of the Film Festival have been Brides with 3 sell out screenings to date, The Counterfeit Coin, Testosterone and Liza and The Others.

== Other information ==
The movie saw 1000 simultaneous screenings in Russia. It was a box office success with 208,410 tickets only from the first run in Athens, more than any other movie for that season. It has also been honored with several film awards (Venice, Moscow) and nominations.
