= Giannakopoulos =

Giannakopoulos (Greek: Γιαννακόπουλος) is a Greek patronymic surname, meaning "son of Giannakis". The female version of the name is Giannakopoulou (Γιαννακοπούλου). Notable examples include:

- Pavlos Giannakopoulos (1929–2018), Greek businessman
- Thanassis Giannakopoulos (c.1930–2019), Greek businessman, former chairman of Panathinaikos BC
- Dimitrios Giannakopoulos (born 1974), Greek businessman, current chairman of Panathinaikos BC
- Stelios Giannakopoulos (born 1974), Greek footballer
- Nadia Giannakopoulou (born 1977), Greek politician
