= Mimis Fotopoulos =

Greek actor, writer, poet and academic

Dimitris "Mimis" Fotopoulos (Greek: Δημήτρης (Μίμης) Φωτόπουλος; 8 April 1913 – 29 October 1986) was a Greek actor, writer, poet, and artist.

He was born in Zatouna, Gortynia, Arcadia. He studied at the Dramatic School of National Theatre (Δραματική Σχολή του Εθνικού Θεάτρου). He also studied at the Philosophical School at the University of Athens until his second year in 1933. He headed a theatrical company from 1952 and was an actor from 1960.

He died on 29 October 1986 in Athens, from a heart attack, aged 73.

== Selected filmography ==
- 100,000 Pounds (1948) ..... Kleomenis Finins
- The Germans Strike Again (1948) ..... Nikos
- To pontikaki (1954) ..... Babis
- Oute gata oute zimia (1954) ..... Stelios Molfetas
- The Counterfeit Coin (1955) ..... beggar
- Golfo (1955) ..... Giannos
- Madame X (1956) ..... Dimitrakis Perisaris
- The Fortune Teller (1956) ..... Spyros Tsardis
- Ta kitrina gantia (1960) ..... Leandros
- Treloi polyteleias (1963) ..... Kyriakos
- Allos gia to ekatommyrio (1964) ..... Savvas
- O periergos (1982) ..... hotel manager

== Writings ==
He wrote books:

- Bouloukia (Μπουλούκια) 1940
- Imitonia (Ημιτόνια) 1960
- Sklira trioleta (Σκληρά τριολέτα) 1961
- 25 Chronia Theatro (25 χρόνια θέατρο = 25 Years of Theatre) 1958, autobiography
- To Potami Tis Zois Mou (Το ποτάμι της ζωής μου = The River of My Life) 1965, autobiography
- Ena Koritsi Sto Parathyro (Ένα κορίτσι στο παράθυρο) 1966, theatrical work
- Pelopidas O Kalos Politis (Πελοπίδας ο καλός πολίτης = Pelopidas The Good Citizen), theatrical work, 1976

His important works were from Chekhov, Ibsen and from Shakespeare at the Royal Garden in 1956. He appeared in hundreds of comedies other than his dramatic roles. He appeared in such films as Kalpiki Lira, Laterna, Ftochia Ke Filotimo, and Ta Kitrina Gandia.

== Affiliations ==
- D.S. of the Hellenic Actors Guild, member
- Panhellenic Union of the Free Theatricals, member
- D.S. Armed Decree, president
