= Vasilis Logothetidis =

Greek comedian

- Βασίλης Λογοθετίδης
- Born: Vasilis Tavlaridis (Βασίλης Ταυλαρίδης); 1897; Myriophyton, Eastern Thrace, Ottoman Empire (now Turkey)
- Died: February 22, 1960 (aged 62–63); Athens, Greece
- Occupations: Actor, Comedian
- Years active: 1916–1960
- Notable work: Madam Sousou (1948), The Germans Strike Again (1948), Despoinis eton 39 (1954), O Ziliarogatos (1956), Enas iros me padoufles (1958)

Vasilis Logothetidis

Vasilis Logothetidis (Greek: Βασίλης Λογοθετίδης; 1897 – 22 February 1960) was a Greek comedian. He is considered one of the most significant modern Greek actors.

Logothetidis was born as Vasilis Tavlaridis (Βασίλης Ταυλαρίδης) in 1897 in Myriophyton, a village in Eastern Thrace close to Istanbul. One year after graduating from high school, in 1916, he started to participate as an amateur actor in local shows. In 1918, he moved to Athens where, one year later, he joined the Marika Kotopouli theater company, with which he remained until 1946, with a brief pause in 1935. From 1947, he performed with his own theater company.

During his very successful career, he starred in more than 110 Greek comedies and in more than 200 international plays, including Arsenic and Old Lace by Joseph Kesselring, As You Like It by William Shakespeare, Volpone by Ben Jonson and Knock by Jules Romains.

Logothetidis was among the first Greek actors to appear in film, mostly as a protagonist. His memorable roles include:

- Panagiotakis in Madam Sousou (1948)
- Thodoros Ginopoulos in The Germans Strike Again (1948)
- Manolis Skoudris in Ena votsalo sti limni (1952)
- Fotis Fagris in Santa Chiquita (1953)
- Tilemahos in Despoinis eton 39 (1954)
- Lalakis Makrykostas in Oute gata, oute zimia (1955)
- Anargyros Loubardopoulos in Istoria mias kalpikis liras (1955)
- Potis Antonopoulos in O Ziliarogatos (1956)
- Antonis Dellistavrou in Dellistavrou kai ios (1957)
- General Labros Dekavallas in Enas iros me padoufles (1958)

In 1957, he toured the United States with successful appearances in eight cities.

Logothetidis died in Athens on 20 February 1960 from a heart attack.
