= Centre for the Greek Language =

Organization

- Founded: 1994
- Founder: Government of Greece
- Type: Cultural institution
- Headquarters: Thessaloniki, Macedonia, Greece
- Region served: Worldwide
- Product: Greek cultural education

The Centre for the Greek Language (Greek: Κέντρο Ελληνικής Γλώσσας) is a cultural and educational organisation which aims to promote the Greek language and culture. It was founded in 1994. The centre is based in Thessaloniki, and also has an office in Athens. The Centre for the Greek Language acts as a coordinating, advisory and strategic organ of the Greek Ministry of Education on matters of language education and policy. Its functions include providing materials and support for people learning Greek as a foreign language. It is linked to the Aristotle University of Thessaloniki.
