= Ancient Civilizations Forum =

Cooperation of eleven nations

The Ancient Civilizations Forum (ACF) is an initiative that brings together 11 nations - Italy, Greece, Egypt, Armenia, Iraq, Iran, India, China, Peru, Bolivia and Mexico - to leverage cultural diplomacy, protect heritage, and promote international cooperation for peace and development. The ACF uses soft power and cultural heritage to foster economic growth, dialogue, and stability among nations with rich historical backgrounds. Participating countries focus on combating the illegal trafficking of cultural goods, protecting monuments during conflicts, and managing the effects of climate change on heritage sites.

The forum brings together representatives from the major foundational cultures, including Mesopotamian, Egyptian, Greek, Persian, Indian, Chinese, Roman, Mayan, and Inca civilizations. The initiative was launched in 2017 by Greece and China to promote cultural cooperation as a key driver of modern foreign policy.
