= Allos gia to ekatommyrio =

1964 film

- Directed by: Orestis Laskos
- Written by: Nikos Tsiforos; Giorgos Lazaridis; Polyvios Vasileiadis
- Produced by: Roussopouloi-G. Lazaridis-D. Sarris-K. Psarras Productions
- Starring: Mimis Fotopoulos; Giannis Gkionakis; Beata Assimakopoulou; Vassilis Avlonitis; Eleni Anousaki; Stavros Paravas; Giorgos Kappis; Katerina Gioulaki; Marika Krevata; Periklis Christoforidis; Vassilis Mavrommatis
- Music by: Giorgos Mitsakis
- Distributed by: Finos Film
- Release date: 1964
- Running time: 90 minutes
- Country: Greece
- Language: Greek

Allos gia to ekatommyrio (Greek: Άλλος για το εκατομμύριο, romanized: Alos gia to ekatomirio, Somebody for a Millionaire) is a 1964 Greek comedy film directed by Orestis Laskos and written by Nikos Tsiforos and starring Mimis Fotopoulos, Giannis Gkionakis, Beata Assimakopoulou, Vassilis Avlonitis and Eleni Anoussaki.

== Plot ==
Until some jokingly honest employee holds his bill for his friend for a millionaire without any directions. The problems started when his friend died in an air crash and the honest employee (Mimis Fotopoulos) prepared to return for the lawful inheritance.

== Cast ==
- Mimis Fotopoulos as Savvas
- Vasilis Avlonitis as Babis
- Giannis Gkionakis as Kokos
- Eleni Anousaki as Nelli
- Stavros Paravas as Stratos
- Beata Assimakopoulou as Anna
- Giorgos Kappis as Aristidis Fysekis
- Katerina Gioulaki as Loulou
- Marika Krevata as Matina
- Betty Moschona as Loukidou
- Periklis Christoforidis as Karpidis
- Vassilis Mavrommatis as Jim
- Giorgos Velentzas as Vangelis
- Nassos Kedrakas as Charilaos
