= Anna Fonsou =

Greek actress

- Born: July 6, 1939; Kaisariani
- Spouse(s): Kostas Paltoglou; Nikos Sofianos; Takis Bougas (1985–1993)

Anna Fonsou (Greek: Άννα Φόνσου; born July 6, 1939) is a Greek actress and social activist.

== Biography ==
Anna Fonsou was born in 1939 in Kaisariani in Greece and grew up in Tinos. She studied at the drama school of Dimitris Rondiris. She studied dance with Rallou Manou and singing with Popi Petrioli. Fonsou made her first theater appearance in 1956 with the troupe of Katerina Andreadi and her first film appearance in 1957 in the movie Το παιδί του δρόμου (The Child of the Street). In 1965, she founded Proskinio together with Alexis Solomos and Aimilios Hourmouzis.

In cinema, she played in dozens of films, almost exclusively leading roles, in both dramas and comedies alongside famous comedians such as Thanasis Veggos with whom she co-starred in several films. In the early 1970s, she also did a series of erotic films, mainly directed by Omiros Efstratiadis, which are now considered cult.

On television she participated in various series (The Two Orphans, The Ragpickers, etc.) and in theatrical performances on the show The Theater of Monday. She starred at the Lyric Stage in the operetta The Apaches of Athens, and since 2001, she has been part of the National Theatre of Northern Greece.

In the 1996 parliamentary elections and the 2000 elections, she was a candidate with the KKE, and in the 2009 and 2012 elections she was a candidate with the PASOK in Athens A.

In 1997 she founded charitable foundation "The Actor's House" (Greek: Το σπίτι του Ηθοποιού) to provide housing for impoverished actors, of which she is a president. She produces theatrical performances, the proceeds of which are also donated to "The Actor's House". From 1998 to 2000, she served as president of the Greek Actors Union.

In 2016 she was awarded the Nikolaos Karolos prize by the Academy of Athens for her social work related to "The Actor's House".

She was married to theater entrepreneur and civil engineer Kostas Paltoglou, architect Nikos Sofianos, and in 1985 to singer-songwriter and composer Takis Bougas until they divorced in 1993.

== Filmography ==
Year	Title	Greek title	Direction	Mode	Role
1957	The street kid	Το παιδί του δρόμου	Frixos Iliadis	Dramatic	Vasoula / Maroula
1957	Fanouris and his family	Ο Φανούρης και το σόι του	Dimitris Ioannopoulos	Comedy	Elenitsa Skarvetsou
1958	The secret of the accused	Το μυστικό της κατηγορουμένης	Maurice Novak	Dramatic	Lila Diveri
1959	The tomboy	Το αγοροκόριτσο	Dimis Dadiras	Comedy, sentimental	Alexa
1960	A Don Juan for crying	Ένας Δον Ζουάν για κλάματα	Dimis Dadiras	Comedy	Tzini (Ioanna) Kalomiris
1960	The boy I love	Τ' αγόρι π' αγαπώ	Giannis Dalianidis	Comedy, sentimental	Lisa
1961	The Smart Bird	Το έξυπνο πουλί	Orestis Laskos	Comedy, sentimental	Lantern
1961	Devil sock	Διαβόλου κάλτσα	Grigoris Grigoriou	Comedy, sentimental	Rena
1962	Anger	Οργή	Vasilis Georgiadis	Dramatic	Lily
1962	Ten days in Paris	Δέκα μέρες στο Παρίσι	Orestis Laskos	Comedy	Alexa Zepa
1963	This something else	Αυτό το κάτι άλλο	Grigoris Grigoriou	Comedy, musical	Nana (Athanasia) Penari
1964	Thirst for life	Δίψα για ζωή	Socrates Kapsaskis	Dramatic	Katerina Negreponti
1964	The last Temptation	Ο τελευταίος πειρασμός	Socrates Kapsaskis	Dramatic	Nina
1965	The nets of shame	Τα δίχτυα της ντροπής	Errikos Thalassinos	Dramatic	Maria
1965	Bitter life	Πικρή ζωή	Socrates Kapsaskis	Dramatic	Marina
1965	Spend the first of the month	Περάστε την πρώτη του μηνός	Socrates Kapsaskis	Comedy	Anna
1965	He's a... crazy crazy Vengos	Είναι ένας... τρελλός τρελλός Βέγγος	Panos Glykofridis	Comedy	(cameo)
1966	The guilty	Οι ένοχοι	Kostas Asimakopoulos	Dramatic	Christina
1966	All men are the same	Όλοι οι άνδρες είναι ίδιοι	Alekos Sakellarios	Comedy	Calliope of Musk
1967	Bride unborn	Νυμφίος ανύμφευτος	Orestis Laskos	Comedy	Suzi Bassi
1967	The playful one	Η παιχνιδιάρα	Christos Kyriakopoulos	Comedy	Kaiti Lorentzou
1968	The return of Medea	Η επιστροφή της Μήδειας	Yannis Christodoulou	Dramatic	Artemis Dima
1969	Who Is Thanassis!!	Ποιος Θανάσης!!	Thanasis Vengos	Comedy	Stella
1969	Stratis went astray	Ο Στρατής παραστράτησε	Kostas Karagiannis	Comedy	Dora Galatis
1969	The countess of the factory	Η κόμισσα της φάμπρικας	Dimis Dadiras	Comedy	Efi (Sofia) Tepeherli
1969	The trial of an innocent	Η δίκη ενός αθώου	Kostas Asimakopoulos	Dramatic	Anna
1970	See: "Lucian"	Βλέπε: «Λουκιανός»	George Emirzas	Dramatic	Venus
1970	The brave of the north	Οι γενναίοι του Βορρά	Kostas Karagiannis	Dramatic	(dancer)
1970	The unlikely	Ο απίθανος	Orestis Laskos	Comedy	Daisy
1971	My private life	Ιδιωτική μου ζωή	Homer Efstratiadis	Police, erotic	Anna
1971	The arch liar	Ο αρχιψεύταρος	Errikos Thalassinos	Comedy	Daphne Porter
1971	Holidays in Vietnam	Διακοπές στο Βιετνάμ	Panos Glykofridis	Comedy	Frosso Hadjifapa
1971	Proud eagles	Υπερήφανοι αετοί	Philippa Phylaktos	Adventure	Love of Vassiliadou
1972	Provocation	Πρόκλησις	Homer Efstratiadis	Adventure, romance	Isabella
1972	Lysistrata	Λυσιστράτη	George Zervoulakos	Comedy	Myrin
1972	Hunted lovers	Κυνηγημένοι ερασταί	Homer Efstratiadis	Adventure, romance	Samantha
1972	Hotter than the sun	Πιο θερμή κι από τον ήλιο	Homer Efstratiadis	Dramatic, erotic	Eleana
1972	The stranger of that night	Ο άγνωστος εκείνης της νύχτας	Odysseus Kosteletos	Dramatic	Diana
1973	The Renegade	Ο αποστάτης	Phaedon Georgitsis	Dramatic	Sula
1973	The Girl and the Horse	Το κορίτσι και τ' άλογο	Vangelis Serdaris	Dramatic, erotic	Julia
1980	Members of Parliament	Βουλευτές και βουλευτίνες	Nikos Avrameas	Comedy	Kate
1980	Each with their own madness	Καθένας με την τρέλλα του	George Lazaridis	Comedy	Anna
1987	The rope	Ο κλοιός	Kostas Koutsomytis	Adventure, Social, Political	Mary
1991	Window to the sea	Παράθυρο στη θάλασσα	Maria Iliou	Dramatic	
1996	New order	Νέα τάξη	Kostas Megapanos	Dramatic	
1997	We'll know tomorrow. Dharma Blue Bums	Αύριο θα ξέρουμε. Dharma Blue Bums	Andreas Thomopoulos	Dramatic	Save
2002	Ballad of Lost Moonlight	Μπαλάντα στο χαμένο σεληνόφως	Nikos Xithalis	Dramatic	woman
2016	Come on	Ξα μου	Cleo Fanourakis	Dramatic	disappointed woman
2018	Waiting room	Αίθουσα αναμονής	Alexandros Leontaritis	Horror	Jenny
