= Thou-Vou Bald Agent, Operation Havoc =

Thou-Vou falakros praktor, epiheirisis "Yis Mathiam" Θου-Βου Φαλακρός πράκτωρ: Επιχείρησις γης μαδιάμ
- Thanasis Veggos as "000"
- Directed by: Thanasis Vengos
- Written by: Giorgos Lazaridis
- Produced by: Thanasis Vengos
- Starring: Thanasis Vengos, Zannino, Antonis Papadopoulos
- Cinematography: Pavlos Filippou, Dinos Katsouridis, Dimitris Papakonstadis
- Edited by: Pavlos Filippou, Dinos Katsouridis
- Distributed by: Thanasis Vengos Tainies Geliou (Thanasis Vengos, Films of Laughter), Finos Film
- Release date: 1969
- Running time: 94 minutes
- Country: Greece
- Language: Greek

Thou-Vou Bald Agent, Operation Havoc, also known as Thou-Vou falakros praktor, epiheirisis "Yis Mathiam" (Greek: Θου-Βου Φαλακρός πράκτωρ: Επιχείρησις Γης Μαδιάμ), is a 1969 Greek spy comedy film directed by Thanasis Vengos. Written by Giorgos Lazaridis, the film stars Thanasis Vengos, Zannino, and Antonis Papadopoulos. It was the sequel to Help Its Vengos Visible Agent '000' (1967).

The film was shot in black-and-white. The director of photography was Dinos Katsouridis.

== Title ==
The film title means Thou-Vou the Bald Agent and Operation Destruction of the Land.

The title character is codenamed Thou-Vou (Greek: Θου-Βου. "Thou" stands for Theta, "Vou" stands for Beta. They form the Greek initials of protagonist Thanasis Vengos (Θανάσης Βέγγος, pronounced: Thanássis Végos).

"Yis Mathiam" derives from the terms Γης (Yis or Gis) for "Land" and Μαδιάμ (Mathiam or Madiam) for Midian, a Biblical area. The term is a byword of destruction in modern Greek.

== Plot ==
The inept secret agent Thou-Vou (Thanasis Vengos) has finally graduated. He and his fellow agent MAP 31 (Antonis Papadopoulos) partner up to open their own agency. Their first customers are drama film director Tzimis Paloukas (Vasilis Andreopoulos) and his associates from the film company "Ah Vah" (Greek: Αχ Βαχ, the term means woe). They task them with three missions but their true intention is to secretly film the agents in action. They are fully aware of their ineptness and intend to use the footage for Ah Vah's first comedy film. The missions are an excuse for a series of gags.

One of their missions involves searching for a hippie by the name of Roza Alimonou (Sofi Zanninou). Thou-Vou is convinced that this is the true identity of a Romani woman who happens to go by the name Roza (Sassa Kazeli). The misunderstanding causes fights in a Romani camp. Another has them take part in a catch wrestling match against wrestler Spazokefalos (Dimitri Karystinos), whose professional name means "Headbreaker". The third has them interrupt the filming process of one of Ah Vah's rival firms.

The final mission proves fatal for Thou-Vou. The film ends with the deceased agent in the afterlife, preparing to enter Heaven.

== Cast ==
- Thanasis Veggos ..... Thou-Vou
- Antonis Papadopoulos ..... Map 31
- Vasilis Andreopoulos ..... Dimis
- Zannino ..... Jacob
- Kostas Mentis ..... Theodoros
- Sasa Kazeli ..... Roza
- Giorgos Tzifos ..... Apostolos
- Kostas Stavrinoudakis ..... assistant director
- Periklis Christoforidis ..... school director
- Stathis Hatzipavlis ..... Pantelis Alimonos
- Sophie Zaninou ..... Rosa Alimonou
- Makis Demiris ..... Hippie leader
- Rena Paschalidou ..... instructor
- Kostas Papachristos ..... Sou-Pou
- Dimitris Karystinos ..... Spazokefalos
- Apostolos Souglakos ..... Spazokefalos's opponent
- Takis Miliadis ..... Lolos
