= Praktores 005 enantion Hrysopodarou =

Praktores 005 enantion Chrysopodarou/Hrysopodarou Πράκτορες 005 εναντίον Χρυσοπόδαρου
- Directed by: Orestis Laskos
- Written by: Orestis Laskos
- Produced by: Roussopouloi-G. Lazaridis-D. Sarris-K. Psarras Productions
- Starring: Kostas Rigopoulos; Kostas Hatzihristos; Giannis Gkionakis; Beata Asimakopoulou; Dina Triadi; Eleni Kriti; Giorgos Vrassivanopoulos; Giorgos Velentzas; Nassos Kedrakas
- Cinematography: Lefteris Siaskas
- Music by: Giorgos Mitsakis
- Distributed by: Finos Film
- Release date: 1965
- Running time: 71 minutes
- Country: Greece
- Language: Greek

Praktores 005 enantion (C)Hrysopodarou or Praktores 005 ena(n)dion Hris(s)opodarou (Greek: Πράκτορες 005 εναντίον Χρυσοπόδαρου) is a 1965 Greek comedy film written and directed by Orestis Laskos and starring Kostas Rigopoulos, Costas Hajihristos, Giannis Gkionakis, Beata Asimakopoulou, Giorgos Vrassivanopoulos and Giorgos Velentzas. The film was shot in black-and-white.

The film title means Agents 005 against Goldenfoot, in humorous reference to Goldfinger (1964).

== Plot ==
The protagonists of the film are the brothers Damianos (Giannis Gkionakis) and Kosmas (Costas Hajihristos) Bouralas, fans of the James Bond film series and tavern owners. They are also shareholders of a manufacturing company, co-owning 5%. They use the codename Agents 005 to refer to themselves, after the number of the shares they own.

The company's chief executive officer is Mikes Pararas (Kostas Rigopoulos), who owns 47,5% of the shares. He and his right-hand man Telis Hatzineftis (Giorgos Vrasivanopoulos) shamelessly exploit the company's staff and embezzle its funds. The Bouralas brothers nickname Mikes "Goldenfoot".

The status quo of the company is shaken with the imminent arrival of Rita Pavlidi (Eleni Kriti), owner of the remaining 47,5% shares of the company. Rita is able to challenge the control of Mikes' in the company, since she owns an equal number of shares. In the upheaval, the Bouralas brothers take over the running of the company. With the assistance of Aleka (Beata Asimakopoulou) and Fofo (Dina Triadi), they uncover evidence of the previous administration's financial crimes.

== Cast ==
- Kostas Rigopoulos ..... Mikes Pararas
- Costas Hajihristos ..... Kosmas Bouralas
- Giannis Gkionakis ..... Damianos Bouralas
- Beata Asimakopoulou ..... Aleka
- Dina Triadi ..... Fofo
- Eleni Kriti ..... Rita Pavlidi
- Yorgos Vrassivanopoulos ..... Telis Hatzineftis
- Panayiostis Karavoussianos ..... Karadaounis
- Giorgos Velentzas ..... Giannis
- Nassos Kedrakas ..... Papasotiriou
- Giorgos Tzifos ..... customer
