= Nikos Stavridis =

Greek actor

Nikos Stavridis Νίκος Σταυρίδης
- Born: 6 April 1910; Vathy, Samos, Principality of Samos (now Greece)
- Died: 12 December 1987 (aged 77) suburban Athens, Greece
- Occupation: actor

Nikos Stavridis (Greek: Νίκος Σταυρίδης, 6 April 1910 – 12 December 1987) was a Greek actor in film and theater.

== Biography ==
He started his career at a musical theatre, he participated in shows, operettas and varieties. In the 1940s, he began to make his own company and combined with famous stars especially Rena Vlachopoulou, the Kalouta sisters, Kaiti Diridaoua and Marika Nezer, also Kaiti Belinda and Marika Nezer (1958: Teddy Boys by Gialama-Thisviou-Pretenteris), also with Dionyssis Papayiannopoulos and Sofia Vembo in 1959, Costas Hadjihristos (1963), etc. He took part in a space (1954–55) in which he worked together with Takis Miliaids and Nana Skiada in the Greek Musical Comedy in which raised his shows even it is a prose, even the comedy Ten Days in Paris with Dionyssis Papayiannopoulos (1960). He entered even into film. He played his first role in movies (I oraia ton Athinon, 1952), Orestis Laskos (I ftochia thelei kaloperassi, 1957, Ftohadakia ke leftades, 1960, O hazobabas, 1967), by Panos Glykofrydis (Douleies me fountes, 1958), by Alekos Sakellarios (The Yellow Gloves) Eftychos trelathika (1961) by Costas Andritsos and many more.

== Filmography ==
Year	Film	Transliteration and translation	Role
1950	Come to Uncle	Έλα στο θείο Ela sto theio	-
1953	The Beauty of Athens	Η ωραία των Αθηνών; I orea ton Athinon	Kosmas
1954	I papatzides	Οι Παπατζήδες	-
1955	Katadikasmeni ki ap' to paidi tis	Καταδικασμένη κι απ' το παιδί της	-
1956	Resident's Office	Γραφείον συνοικεσίων Grafeion synoikesion	-
1956	Eros ftocheia kai kompines	Έρως φτώχεια και κομπίνες	-
1957	Tria paidia Voliotika	Τρία παιδιά Βολιώτικα	-
1957	Jeep, Kiosk and Love	Τζιπ, περίπτερο κι αγάπη Jeep, periptero kai agapi	-
1957	Barba-Yiannis o kanatas	Μπαρμπα- Γιάννης ο κανατάς	-
1958	Kefi, glenti kai figoura	Κέφι, γλέντι και φιγούρα	-
1958	Gerakina	Γερακίνα	-
1958	I ftochoeia thelei kaloperasi	Η φτώχεια θέλει καλοπέραση	-
1959	Treis magkes sto parthenagogeio	Τρεις μάγκες στο παρθεναγωγείο	-
1959	I Lili kai o mourntaris	Η Λιλή και ο μουρντάρης	-
1959	Douleies me fountes	Δουλειές με φούντες	-
1959	Bloomed Almonds	Ανθισμένη αμυγδαλιά Anthismeni amygdalia	-
1960	Soussourada	Σουσουράδα	-
1960	The Yellow Gloves	Τα κίτρινα γάντια Ta kitrina gantai	Orestis Kaligaridis
1960	Snow White and the 7 Dwarves	Η Χιονάτη και τα 7 γεροντοπαλίκαρα I Chinati kai ta 7 gerontopalikara	Konstantinos the Beautiful
1960	2000 Sailors and a Girl	2.000 ναύτες και ένα κορίτσι 2.000 naftes kai ena koritsi	-
1961	O palikaras	Ο παλικαράς	-
1961	Mana mou, tou agapissa	Μανα μου, τον αγάπησα	-
1961	Ftodahakia ke leftades	Φτωχαδάκια και λεφτάδες	Teo Dalekis
1961	Eftychos trelathika	Ευτυχώς τρελάθηκα	Harilaos Maraziotis
1962	O Stamatis kai o Grigoris	Ο Σταμάτης και ο Γρηγόρης	-
1962	Koroido gabre	Κορόιδο γαμπρέ	-
1962	O gabros mou o dikigoros	Ο γαμπρός μου ο δικηγόρος The Judge, My Husband	-
1962	I Ellinida kai o erotas	Η Ελληνίδα και ο έρωτας	-
1962	Ten Days in Paris	Δέκα μέρες στο Παρίσι; Deka imeres sto Parissi	-
1963	Ziteitai timios	Ζητείται τίμιος	-
1963	I skandaliarides	Οι σκανδαλιάρηδες	-
1963	Epta imeres psemmata	Επτά ημέρες ψέματα	-
1963	O Diaititis	Ο Διαιτητής	-
1963	O adelfos mou o trochonomos	Ο αδελφός μου ο τροχονόμος My Brother, the Traffic Officer	-
1964	O lagopodaros	Ο λαγοπόδαρος	-
1964	Kosmos kai kosmakis	Κόσμος και Κοσμάκης	Antonis Karel(l)is
1965	Exotic Vitamins	Εξωτικές βιταμίνες Exotikes vitamines	-
1965	Ftocho mou spourgitaki	Φτωχό μου σπουργιτάκι	-
1965	Beethoven and Bouzouki	Μπετόβεν και Μπουζούκι	Doltsetos
1966	O exypnakias	Ο εξυπνάκιας	Sokratis Panas
1966	Eispraktor 007	Εισπράκτωρ 007	Xenofontas
1967	I paichnidiara	Η Παιχνιδιάρα	factory head
1967	O hazobabas	Ο χαζομπαμπάς	-
1967	O Anakatosouras	Ο Ανακατωσούρας	Lazaros
1968	I thyrorina	Η θυρωρίνα	-
1968	Pychraimia, Napoleon	Ψυχραιμία, Ναπολέων	-
1968	The Most Good Student	Ο πιο καλός ο μαθητής O pio kalos o mathitis	-
1968	Treis treloi gia desimo	Τρεις τρελοί για δέσιμο	-
1969	O thavmatopoios	Ο θαυματοποιός	Sarandos
1969	Kathe kategaris ston pagko tou	Κάθε κατεργάρης στον πάγκο του	-
1969	To afentiko mou itan koroido	Το αφεντικό μου ήταν κορόιδο	-
1970	The Dry-Head	Ο ξεροκέφαλος O xerokefalos	-
1970	The Three Liars	Οι τρεις ψεύτες I tris pseftes	-
1970	The Tree Aces	Οι τέσσερις άσσοι I teseris asi	-
1970	Aristotelis o epipolaios	Αριστοτέλης ο επιπόλαιος	-
1971	O paragios mou o ralistas	Ο παραγιός μου ο ραλίστας	-
1971	Omorfopaida	Ομορφόπαιδα	-
1971	O Cowboy tou Metaxourgeiou	Ο καου- μπόι του Μεταξουργείου	-
1971	Dio moderni glendzedes	Δυο μοντέρνοι γλεντζέδες	
1971	O theios mou o Ippokratis	Ο θείος μου ο Ιπποκράτης; My Uncle Ippokratis	-
1972	O Anthropos Roloi	Ο Άνθρωπος Ρολόι; The Human Role	-
1972	Pos katandissame Sotiri	Πώς καταντήσαμε Σωτήρη	-

=== As himself ===
- Athens by Night [Η Αθήνα τη νύχτα, I Athina ti nychta] (1962) - as himself
