= Who Is Thanassis =

Poios Thanas(s)sis Ποιος Θανάσης Which Thanassis
- Directed by: Thanassis Vengos
- Written by: Giorgos Lazaridis
- Produced by: Thanassis Vengos
- Starring: Thanassis Veggos; Anna Fonsou; Vangelos Ploios; Giorgos Velentzas; Nasos Kedrakas; Nitsa Marouda; Sasa Kazelli; Emilia Ipsilandi; Takis Miliadis; Giorgos Tzifos; Stavros Xenidi; Rena Paschalidou; Keti Sigala
- Distributed by: Finos Film
- Release date: 1969
- Running time: 90 minutes
- Country: Greece
- Language: Greek

Poios Thanas(s)is (Greek: Ποιος Θανάσης, Who Is Thanassis) is a 1969 Greek comedy directed and written by Thanassis Vengos and starring himself, Anna Fonsou and Vangelos Ploios. The film marks the debut of Emilia Ipsilandi.

== Plot ==
Thanassis Trikorfos (Vengos) is a polite and compassionate electrical appliance dealer, who helps and serves worldwide, even when he himself is in difficulty. He hires the graceful Stella (Fonsou), who needs the money since her card player friend Alekos (Ploios) ends up betting away everything she earns.

Thanassis, who has been unhappy, becomes fascinated with Stella's shrewdness and good heart. He falls in love with her, and his happiness returns. Stella feels the same way, but has to conceal it for fear of her boyfriend's reaction.

When the kind and trusting Thanassis learns the woman he loves is already engaged, his wounded heart hardens and he becomes distant. From a gallant shop owner he becomes a shrewish, domineering and demanding merchant.

Meanwhile, two of his friends (Takis Miliadis and Giorgos Velentzas) are attempting to persuade him to cooperate with secular businesswoman Margaret Kerani (Ipsilandi), whose ultimate aim is to take over the shop.

Stella, who overhears the conversation and discovers the "good friends" preparing to set the trap for Thanassis, frustrates their plans at the last moment. Because of this behavior, her love for Thanassis is finally revealed.

The film blends comedy with emotional elements and ends happily.

== Cast ==
- Thanassis Vengos as Thanassis Trikorfos
- Anna Fonsou as Stella
- Vangelis Ploios as Alekos
- Giorgios Velentzas as Pantelis
- Nasos Kedrakas as Prokopis
- Nitsa Marouda as Elpida Trikorfou
- Sassa Kazelli as Stella
- Emilia Ipsilandi as Margaret Koraki
- Takis Miliadis as Fondas
- Giorgos Tzifos as Pelopidas
- Stavros Xenidis
- Rena Pashalidou as Hatzimousouri
- Kaiti Sigala
