= Alaloum =

Alaloum Αλαλούμ
- Directed by: Giorgos Apostolidis; Giannis Smaragdis; Giannis Typaldos
- Written by: Gianni Kakoulidis; Harry Klynn
- Starring: Harry Klynn; Manos Destounis; Joly Garbi; Dimitris Piatas; Sassa Soufou; Nitsa Tsaganea; Giorgos Tzifos; Kostas Tzoumas
- Music by: Gerasimos Lavranos
- Release date: 26 October 1982
- Running time: 120 minutes
- Country: Greece
- Language: Greek

Alaloum (Greek: Greek: Αλαλούμ) is a 1982 Greek comedy film directed by Giorgos Apostolidis, Giannis Smaragdis and Giannis Typaldos, starring Harry Klynn, Manos Destounis and Joly Garbi.

== Plot ==
The movie features between different sketches and comedic productions in Greek entertainment in the 1980s with Harry Klynn playing different roles. One of them included: Officer Bekas who plays one fanatic who entered the wrong home, Artemis, which he had existence of an entry and Golfo in which Klynn played and as Trabakoula, a kind Vlach who lived in the village of Letsovo, in which progress and technology are practically unknown, until a peddler brought the TV and other electronic equipment, which changed the life of the local people. Finally, the people will split in three groups: Red, Green and Blue (the colors of the major political parties). They do not have made it without knowing who brought it by the shipper from the city.

== Quotes ==
- Πολύ νόημα, μιλάμε για πολύ νόημα να πούμε (Poly noima milame yia poli noima na poume = "Much senses, talking for much senses where we say")
- As to pistepso (Ας το πιστέψω = As I believe)
- "I want to know who I am, my name is Artemi (Θέλω να ξέρω ποιος είμαι, με λένε Αρτέμη = Thelo na xero pios ime, me lene Artemi)

== Cast ==
- Harry Klynn ..... multiple characters
- Mano Destouni
- Joly Garbi ..... Thymokleia
- Dimitris Piatas ..... Tasos
- Sassa Sofou ..... TV presenter
- Nitsa Tsaganea ..... Alkmene
- Giorgos Tzifos
- Konstantinos Tzoumas ..... political instructor
