= Giannis Smyrnaios =

Greek actor (1940–2019)

- Born: October 17, 1940; Athens, Greece
- Died: March 2019 (aged 58); Kypseli, Athens, Attica, Greece
- Occupation: Actor

Giannis Smyrnaios (October 17, 1940 – March 2019) was a Greek actor of television, theater, and cinema. He became known for his supporting roles in Greek cinema and movies during the VHS era.

== Biography ==
He studied from 1964 to 1966 at the Drama School of the Athens Conservatory. He made his theater debut in the play "Madame Maxime" by Georges Feydeau, with the troupe of Kostas Rigopoulos-Kakias Analyti in 1967. The same year he made his film debut in the movie The Clueless Father.

He collaborated with troupes such as those of Nikos Rizos-Kostas Hatzihristos-Yiannis Vogiatzis in the film My Old Hag (1969–70), of Rizos-Voutsas-Nathanail in the film The Villager (1971–72), of Karras (1972), of Gionakis in the film The Crooked Stick (1973–74), of Alexandrakis-Galinea (1978), of Papanastasiou-Ioannidou (1982), in the play "Kolonos and Kolonaki" at the "Kalouta" theater, by Rizos (1986–87), of Halkias-Partsalakis at the "Metropolitan" theater in the play by Tsiforos-Vasiliadis "Ten Days in Paris" and others.

He died in late March 2019, at his home in Kypseli. The news of his death became known a week later.

== Filmography ==
Year	Title
1970	Giakoumis, a Roman Heart
1970	''In the Name of the Law''
1970	I Accuse the Powerful
1970	Mama's Child
1971	Men Know How to Love
1971	I Love You
1973	The Optimist
1981	Barbara the Traffic Warden
1982	Me and My Cock
1982	Cucumbers Here and Now
1982	The Small Ear
1983	The Iron Lady
1986	I Loved a Pontian
1986	The F.M. Stereo Rider
1989	The Luxury Crazyhouse
