= Kappis =

Kappis is a surname. Notable people with the surname include:

- Albert Kappis (1836–1914), German painter and lithographer
- Giorgos Kappis (1928–1999), Greek actor
