= The Tough Guy =

The Tough Guy may refer to:

- The Tough Guy (1926 film), an American Western film directed by David Kirkland
- The Tough Guy (1961 film), a Greek comedy film directed by Giannis Dalianidis
