= To exypno pouli =

1961 film

- Directed by: Orestis Laskos
- Written by: Nikos Tsiforos; Polyvios Vassileiadis
- Starring: Kostas Hatzichristos; Anna Fonsou; Vasilis Avlonitis; Dimitris Nikolaidis; Takis Christoforidis; Anna Mantzourani; Stavros Paravas
- Release date: 1961
- Running time: 88 minutes
- Country: Greece
- Language: Greek

To exypno pouli (Greek: Το έξυπνο πουλί, "the clever bird") is a 1961 Greek film.

== Cast ==
- Anna Fonsou as Fani
- Kostas Hatzichristos as Loukas
- Stavros Paravas as Mimis
- Vasilis Avlonitis as Thanasis
- Dimitris Nikolaidis as Mihos
- Anna Mantzourani as Nitsa
- Takis Christoforidis as Filotas
- Stavros Paravas as Mimis Santopoulos
- Maria Voulgari as Iro Dalezi
- Katerina Gogou as Marina Mani
- Rallis Angelidis as Apostolis
- Babis Anthopoulos as Tryfonas
- Marika Nezer as store customer
