= Zannino =

Greek actor

- Born: Yannis Papadopoulos; 21 August 1923; Galata, Istanbul, Turkey
- Died: 27 May 1995 (aged 71); Athens, Greece
- Occupation: Actor
- Years active: 1956–1991

Yannis Papadopoulos (21 August 1923 – 27 May 1995), known professionally as Zannino (Greek: Ζαννίνο), was a Greek actor that appeared in more than eighty films from 1956 to 1991 including Midnight Express.

== Filmography ==
Film
Year	Title	Role	Notes
1956	O Drakos		Uncredited
1960	Makrykostaioi kai Kondogiorgides		
1960	Erotika paihnidia	Bournias	
1960	To mystiko tou kokkinou mandya		
1960	O dolofonos agapouse poly...	Secret Officer	
1960	Mitros kai Mitrousis stin Athina	Manolis	
1960	I Nancy tin... psonise!		
1960	I kritikopoula kai o eleftherotis		
1960	Ena koritsi se perimenei		
1961	Efialtis	Valentino	
1961	To spiti tis idonis		
1961	Stegnosan ta dakrya mas		
1961	Mas klepsane tin Golfo		
1961	Agapi kai thyella		
1962	The 300 Spartans	Athenian citizen & Persian General	Uncredited
1962	Min eidate ton Panai?	Periklis	
1962	Vasilias tis gafas	Jim Lucas	
1962	Mi varate oloi mazi	Astropelekis Tzoras	
1962	Exomologisis mias miteras		
1962	Douleies tou podariou		
1962	Astronaftes	Haralabos	
1963	Young Aphrodites	Molossos	
1963	Ziteitai timios	Tough guy	
1963	Zileia	Kostas	
1963	Tyfla na'hei o Marlon Brando	Agathoklis Karmoutzoukos	
1963	Ton vrikame ton Panai		
1963	Thee mou, dos mou to fos mou	Fanouris o Megas	
1963	Oi katergarides	Jim Jim	
1963	Mana, giati me gennises		
1963	Kazanovas	Undercover policeman	
1963	Einai skliros o horismos		
1963	Diestrammenoi		
1964	Lola		
1964	Ta didyma	Mr. Masciolini	
1964	Sholi gia soferines	Katrabas	
1964	O Giannis takane thalassa		
1964	I gefyra tis eftyhias		
1964	Exotikes vitamines	Masseur	
1964	An eheis tyhi...	Thug	
1965	The Naked Brigade	Yannis Karrayiannis	
1965	To thavma tis Megaloharis	Gypsy	
1965	Me pono kai me dakrya		
1965	Kallio pente kai sto heri	Jimmy	
1965	Einai enas... trellos, trellos, trellos Vengos	Giannis	
1966	Une balle au coeur		
1966	Poniros praktor Karagiozis	Veligekas	
1966	O Meletis stin Ameso Drasi	Manolis Vardakakis	
1966	Fos... nero... tilefono, oikopeda me doseis	Sotiris Sotiropoulos	
1967	Voitheia! O Vengos faneros praktor 000	instructor	
1967	Cry in the Wind	Policeman	
1967	The Road to Corinth		
1967	Siko, horepse syrtaki	Lakis	
1967	O methystakas tou limaniou...	Sostis	
1968	Epiheirisis Apollon	Chauffeur	
1968	O petheropliktos	Nightclub customer	
1968	Oi mnistires tis Pinelopis		
1968	Kitsos, mini kai souvlaki		
1968	Kardia pou lygise apo ton pono		
1968	Enas kleftis me filotimo	Burglar	
1969	To nyfopazaro		
1969	Who is Thanassis	bully	Uncredited
1969	O prosfygas		
1969	Enas afragos Onasis	German businessman	
1969	Ena asyllipto koroido	Hans	
1969	Thou-Vou falakros praktor, epiheirisis "Yis Mathiam"	Jacob	
1970	Oi gennaioi tou Vorra	Serafeim	
1970	Oi 4 assoi		
1970	Enas Vengos gia oles tis douleies	Hatzidavelis	
1970	2 trelloi ki o atsidas		
1971	Arhipseftaros		
1971	O dromos ton iroon		
1971	I zavoliara		
1971	Enas yperohos anthropos		
1971	Dyo exypna koroida		
1972	O Puskas ton Petralonon	Fotis	
1972	O prigipas tis agoras	Krotonas	
1972	O kyrios stathmarhis		
1973	O tsarlatanos	Hercules	
1978	Midnight Express	Police detective	
1978	I valitsa tou papa	Bodyguard	
1979	Jack o... kavallaris	Geronimo	
1980	Xevrakotos Romios		
1981	O Kotsos exo apo to N.A.T.O.		
1984	Ta katharmata	Coach	
1996	Kavafis		(final film role)
