= Beata Asimakopoulou =

Greek actress (1932–2009)

- Born: Evdokia Asimakopoulou; 28 June 1932; Zatouna, Greece
- Died: 20 April 2009 (aged 76); Athens, Greece
- Occupation: Actress
- Years active: 1955–2008
- Spouse: Orestis Laskos (m. 1960; died 1992)
- Children: 1

Beata Asimakopoulou (Greek: Μπεάτα Ασημακοπούλου; 28 June 1932 – 20 April 2009) was a Greek actress.

== Family ==
She was married to Greek film director Orestis Laskos; they had at least one child, a son, Vassilis Laskos. She died of cancer.

== Career ==
She appeared in the following:

- Koroido en 'taxei' (2007)
- "Lista gamou" (2003) TV series
- "Happy End" (2002) (TV)
- "Dilimmata" (1997) TV series
- Eleftheri katadysi (1995)
- Afto to koritsi, poios tha to parei? (1985)
- Thymisou ton Septemvri (1985)
- Agapi mou Oua-Oua (1974)
- Pavlos Melas (1973)
- Gia poion htypa i... koudouna (1968)
- O emporakos (1967)
- O hazobabas (1967)
- To ploio tis haras (1967)
- Anthropos gia oles tis douleies (1966)
- Beethoven kai bouzouki (1965)
- O ouranokatevatos (1965)
- Praktores 005 enantion Hrysopodarou (1965)
- Allos... gia to ekatommyrio! (1964)
- Kosmos kai kosmakis (1964)
- O eaftoulis mou (1964)
- Triti kai 13 (1963)
- Zileia (1963)
- Dyo manes sto stavro tou ponou (1962)
- Klapse, ftohi mou kardia (1962)
- Lafina (1962)
- O gabros mou, o dikigoros! (1962)
- Oi gynaikes theloun xylo (1962)
- Ftohadakia kai leftades (1961)
- Oi haramofaides (1961)
- Allou ta kakarismata (1960)
- Antio zoi (1960)
- Na zisoun ta ftohopaida (1959)
- Sarakatsanissa (1959)
- Stournara 288 (1959)
- 4 nyfes ki enas gabros (1958)
- Gerakina (1958)
- I ftoheia thelei kaloperasi (1958)
- Makrya ap' ton kosmo (1958)
- O leftas (1958)
- I kafetzou (1956)
