= O Stratis parastratise =

O Stratis parastratise Ο Στρατής παραστράτησε
- Directed by: Kostas Karagiannis
- Written by: Assimakis Gialamas; Kostas Pretenteris
- Starring: Dinos Iliopoulos; Anna Fonsou; Nikos Rizos; Anna Mantzourani; Dimos Starenios; Kaiti Lambropoulou; Nelli Papa; Giouli Stamoulaki; Nikos Kapios; Giorgos Messalas
- Music by: Giorgos Katsaros
- Distributed by: Karagiannis-Karatzopoulos
- Release date: 1969
- Running time: 98 minutes
- Country: Greece
- Language: Greek

O Stratis parastratise (Greek: Ο Στρατής παραστράτησε, translation: Stratis went astray) is a 1969 Greek black and white comedy starring Dinos Iliopoulos, Anna Fonsou and Nikos Rizos. The film sold 259,606 tickets.

== Plot ==
Stratis (Dinos Iliopoulos), after many years of laborious work, publishes his treatise on Aspasia's role in the Peloponnesian Wars. A team of American film producers approaches him to get the movie rights, planning to use his scientific work for a historical parody. At first he rejects their offer, but finally life's demands and his debts to his relatives compel him to accept. At the same time he falls in love with his cinematic heroine (Anna Fonsou). In the end after the completion of the shooting of the film, his luck changes and he is able to return to his old ways.

== Cast ==
- Dinos Iliopoulos ..... Stratis Damalakis
- Anna Fonsou ..... Dora Galati
- Nikos Rizos ..... Jim Andrews
- Anna Mantzourani ..... Dimitroula Damalaki
- Dimos Starenios ..... Leon Antypas
- Kaiti Lambropoulou ..... Alexandra
- Nelli Papa ..... Athina Xenaki
- Giouli Stamoulaki ..... Thaleia Moschou
- Nikos Kapios ..... Petros Krokidas
- Giorgos Messalas ..... Byron
- Giorgos Grigoriou ..... Athinodoros
- Giorgos Papazisis ..... shoemaker
- Andonis Papadopoulos ..... kiosk owner

== See also ==
- List of Greek films
