= Help! It's Vengos, Overt Agent '000' =

Voitheia! O Vengos faneros praktor 000 Βοήθεια! Ο Βέγγος φανερός πράκτωρ 000
- Directed by: Thanasis Vengos
- Written by: Napoleon Eleftheriou, Nikos Tsiforos
- Produced by: Thanasis Vengos
- Starring: Thanasis Vengos, Zannino, Dimitris Nikolaidis, Antonis Papadopoulos
- Cinematography: Pavlos Filippou
- Edited by: Pavlos Filippou
- Music by: Pavlos Filippou
- Distributed by: Thanasis Vengos Tainies Geliou (Thanasis Vengos, Films of Laughter)
- Release date: 1967
- Running time: 89 minutes
- Country: Greece
- Language: Greek

Help! It's Vengos, Overt Agent '000', also known as Voitheia! O Vengos, faneros praktor 000 (Greek: Βοήθεια! Ο Βέγγος, φανερός πράκτωρ 000), is a 1967 Greek spy comedy film directed by Thanasis Vengos. Written by Napoleon Eleftheriou and Nikos Tsiforos, the film starred Thanasis Vengos, Zannino, Dimitris Nikolaidis, and Antonis Papadopoulos.

The film was shot in black-and-white, in the area surrounding Oion railway station.

Following its success at the box office, Vengos directed a sequel, Thou-Vou falakros praktor, epiheirisis "Yis Mathiam" (1969).

== Title ==
The film title is in humorous reference to secret agents (1964). At the time Room 000 meant the public toilet.

The title character is codenamed Thou-Vou (Greek: Θου-Βου. "Thou" stands for Theta, "Vou" stands for Beta. They form the Greek initials of protagonist Thanasis Vengos (Θανάσης Βέγγος, pronounced: Thanássis Végos).

== Plot ==
The protagonist is Athanasios Bobas (Thanasis Vengos), codenamed Thou-Vou. He is a secret agent in training, one of seven students of a spy school named after James Bond. He is trained in Karate, target practice, track and field, etc. He is, however, thoroughly inept. His trainer Zannino consistently grades him with 0.

In order to graduate and receive his degree, Thou-Vou has to successfully complete three missions. He has to put in practice what he has learned so far. He is to be rated with a grade from 0 to 9. His grades will form the three numbers of his new codename. His first mission involves the beautiful daughter of a cantor. The girl is having a secret affair, and Thou-Vou has to find out who her lover is.

His second mission involves a fashion company. Someone has been stealing its patterns and Thou-Vou has to uncover the culprits. The third mission is to recover a secret document which has been hidden away in a cake. He fails spectacularly in each mission and is rated with 0. He graduates with the disappointing number of 000.

== Cast ==
- Thanasis Veggos ..... Thou-Vou
- Zannino ..... trainer
- Dimitris Nikolaidis ..... chief agent 627000
- Periklis Christoforidis ..... school director
- Nitsa Tsaganea ..... Mrs. Psalti
- Lavrentis Dianellos ..... Mr. Psaltis
- Nikos Fermas ..... instructor of theory
- Takis Miliadis ..... Manolis
- Ria Deltoutsi ..... Dora
- Kostas Mentis ..... Sou-Pou
- Takis Christoforidis ..... provisions director
- Antonis Papadopoulos ..... Map 031
- Giannis Sparidis ..... assistant to Thou-Vou
- Kostas Papachristos ..... police officer
- Kostas Stavrinoudakis ..... Sou-Tou
- Mitsi Konstantara ..... designer house director
- Betty Dakopoulou ..... kindergarten teacher
