= Giorgos Tzifos =

Greek actor

Giorgos Tzifos Γιώργος Τζιφός
- Born: 1918; Greece
- Died: 27 May 1986 (aged 67–68); Greece
- Occupation: Actor
- Years active: 1953 - 1983

Giorgos Tzifos (Greek: Γιώργος Τζιφός; 1918 – 27 May 1986) was a Greek actor in theater and movies. He played mostly secondary roles in comedies, even Law 4000 of Giorgos Dalianidis. I Will Make You Queen (as a builder) and I de gyni na fovitai ton andra as a chauffeur. In 1982, he appeared in the movie Alaloum with Harry Klynn. He also appeared in that time in a television series about milk, as a hero of little Bobo. He died on 27 May 1986 and is buried in Athens Cemetery.

== Selected filmography ==
=== As cinematographer ===
Year	Film title (English translation)	Original title and transliteration	Role
1953	The Skies Are Ours	Οι ουρανοί είναι δικοί μας Oi ouranoi einai dikoi mas	-
1954	Happy starting	Χαρούμενο ξεκίνημα Haroumeno ksekinima	Patroklos
1960	The Scorned	Το κλωτσοσκούφι To klotsoskoufi	amusement park employer
1960	The Yellow Gloves	Τα κίτρινα γάντια Ta kitrina gandia	Mr. Spiliotopoulos
1962	Law 4000	Νόμος 4000; Law 4000	-
1964	I Will Make You Queen	Θα σε κάνω βασίλισσα Tha se kano vassilisa	Vangelis
1965	And the Wife Shall Revere Her Husband	Η δε γυνή να φοβήται τον άνδρα I de gini na fovite ton antra	Pantoflas
1967	Mad, crazy and Veggos	Τρελός, παλαβός και Βέγγος; Trelos, palavos kai Vegos	hotel manager
1967	The dressmaker	Ο μόδιστρος O modistros	Koulis
1967	From longing to longing	Από λαχτάρα σε λαχτάρα Apo lahtara se lahtara	-
1969	The curmudgeon	Το στραβόξυλο To stravoksilo	Fondas
1969	Who is Thanassis	Ποιος Θανάσης; Poios Thanassis	Pelopidas
1970	The Mediterranean is on fire	Η Μεσόγειος φλέγεται I Mesogeios flegete	-
1972	O anthropos pou espage plaka	Ο άνθρωπος που έσπαγε πλάκα	Mr. Stravogiannidis
1975	Oi vaseis kai i Vasoula	Οι βάσεις και η Βασούλα	Karadontis
1975	Dritte, Grad, Der	-	-
1975	The Travelling Players	Ο θίασος O Thiasos	-
1976	Thanassis in "slap land"	Ο Θανάσης Στη Χώρα Της Σφαλιάρας; O Thanasis sti hora tis sfaliaras	21 April representative
1979	The bold student	Ο φαλακρός μαθητής O falakros mathitis	-
1982	Alaloum	Αλαλούμ	-
1983	Ink sorbet	Γρανίτα από μελάνι Granita apo melani	Mr. Saltafidas

=== Television ===
Year	Film title (English translation)	Original title and transliteration	Role	Broadcaster
1982	Gianni kai Maria	Γιάννης και Μαρία; Yianni ke Maria	-	-
