= Takis Christoforidis =

Greek actor

Takis Christoforidis Τάκης Χριστοφορίδης
- Born: 1914; Constantinople (now Istanbul, Turkey)
- Died: 17 January 1973 (aged 58–59); Athens
- Occupation: Actor

Takis Christoforidis (Greek: Τάκης Χριστοφορίδης; 1914–1973) was a Greek actor and cousin of Periklis Christoforidis.

== Filmography ==
Selected filmography:

- O thisavros tou makariti (1959)
- To exypno pouli (1961) ..... Filotas
- O skliros andras (1961) ..... police officer
- A Matter of Earnestness (1965) ..... Efstathiou
- Ah! Kai na 'moun antras (1966) ..... Stella's boss
- Voitheia! O Vengos faneros praktor 000 (1967) ..... armaments director
- Thema syneidiseos (1973)

== Sources ==
- Musipedia (in Greek)
