= Ah! Kai na 'moun antras =

1966 film directed by Stefanos Fotiadis

Ah!< Kai na 'moun antras Αχ! Και να 'μουν άντρας
- Directed by: Stefanos Fotiadis
- Written by: Stefanos Fotiadis
- Starring: Maro Kontou; Dionyssis Papayannopoulos; Nikos Rizos; Giorgos Moutsios; Popi Deligianni; Manolis Destounis; Giorgos Grigoriou; Takis Christoforidis; Giannis Mihalopoulos; Loukas Milonas; Nana Skiada; Katerina Gioulaki
- Music by: Giorgos Katsaros
- Distributed by: AB Film
- Release date: 1966
- Running time: 88 min
- Country: Greece
- Language: Greek

Ah! Kai na 'moun antras (Greek: Αχ! Και να 'μουν άντρας) is a 1966 Greek black and white comedy film directed and written by Stefanos Fotiadis and starring Maro Kontou, Dionyssis Papayannopoulos, Nikos Rizos and Giorgos Moutsios.

== Plot ==
Frustrated and unemployed after being sexually harassed repeatedly, Stella poses as her brother, Alekos, an immigrant from Australia, hoping to get a job. She immediately wins the trust of her employers and soon gets promoted to management. Trouble starts when she falls in love with her boss' son.

== Cast ==
- Maro Kontou ..... Stella/Alekos
- Dionyssis Papayannopoulos ..... Othon Belalis
- Giannis Mihalopoulos ..... Savas Makryheris
- Nikos Rizos ..... Pavlos
- Giorgos Moutsios ..... Andreas Belalis
- Popi Deligianni ..... Georgia
- Manolis Destounis ..... police officer
- Giorgios Grigoriou ..... passer-by
- Takis Christoforidis ..... Stella's boss
- Loukas Milonas
- Nana Skiada ..... Aphrodite Belali
- Katerina Gioulaki ..... Vaso

== See also ==
- List of Greek films
