= Takis Miliadis =

Greek actor

- Born: 26 September 1922; Athens, Greece
- Died: 14 April 1985 (aged 62); Ioannina, Greece
- Occupation: Actor

Panagiotis "Takis" Miliadis (Greek: Τάκης Μηλιάδης; 26 September 1922 – 14 April 1985) was a Greek actor who is known for his comedic acting roles.

== Biography ==
Takis Miliadis was born in Athens, Greece on 26 September 1922 into a theatrical and musical family. As his father, Nikos, was an actor in musical theatre, and his mother, Marika Anthopoulou, was an opera singer, he was intensely exposed to theatrical acting during his childhood. His parents wanted him to become a doctor. Although he attended the University Medical School and finished it, he preferred to study theatre and become an actor. He studied theatre during the German Occupation, attending the school of the great acting teachers Kostas Bastias and Dimitris Rontiris. Later, he was characterised as the 'Maurice Chevalier' of Greece. Miliadis married three times, first to Betty Moschona and then to Sasa Kazeli. Finally, he married Paraskevi Kollias and together they raised a son, Marios Miliadis.

Miliadis graduated from the University of Athens Medical School. Throughout his career, Miliadis has played roles in films and theatre. During his theatrical career, he earned great reviews from critics. At one point in his life he worked in Germany as a radio presenter, as part of a Greek-language broadcast.

Other than theatricals, films, radio and television broadcasts, he also did many refreshments in the Athens-Piraues time, with several number of reviews. He was one of the starring hosts in the Sunday television show Haroumeni Kyriaki, Kyriaki horis sinnefa (Χαρούμενη Κυριακή, Κυριακή χωρίς σύννεφα = Happy Sunday, Sunday without Clouds) [1972, ΕΙΡΤ (today ERT1)] in which he performed theatrical sketches and acts.

== Death ==
On 12 April 1985 Miliadis was involved in a car crash near his home in Ioannina. He survived the incident but he was left fatally wounded and he eventually succumbed to his injuries two days later.

== Filmography ==
Year	Film	Transliteration and translation	Role
1960	Allou ta kararismata	Αλλού τα κακαρίσματα ...	-
1961	I Avgi tou Thriamvou	Η Αυγή του Θριάμβου	-
1964	Kosmos kai Kosmakis	Κόσμος και Κοσμάκης (People and its People)	Padelis Touvlaras
1965	Einai enas trelos ... trelos ... trellos ... Veggos	*Eίναι ένας τρελός ... τρελός ... τρελός Βέγγος	James Bondopoulos
1966	Kounia pou se kounage	Kούνια που σε κούναγε	Tryfonas Karabolas
1967	Voitheia! O Vengos faneros praktor 000	Βοήθεια! ... O Βέγγος φανερός πράκτωρ 000	Manolis
1967	Trelos, palavos kai Veggos	Tρελός, παλαβός και Βέγγος	Grigoris
1967	I paichnidiara	Η παιχνιδιάρα	-
1967	The World Has Gone Crazy	Ο κόσμος τρελάθηκε (O kosmos trelathike)	Patroklos
1967	Kolonaki, diagogi miden	Kολωνάκι, διαγωγή μηδέν	Petros de la Sibela
1967	Enas apendaros leftas	Ένας απένταρος λεφτάς	Loukas Grigoriou
1968	Kakos, psihros ki anapodos	Kακός, ψυχρός κι ανάποδος	Giannis Reppas
1969	Thou-Vou falakros praktor, epiheirisis "Yis Mathiam"	Θου-Βου φαλακρός πράκτωρ, επιχείρησις Γης Μαδιάμ	director
1969	Who is Thanassis	Ποιος Θανάσης (Pios Thanassis)	Fondas Bazoukas
1969	Ena asyllipto koroido	Ένα ασύλληπτο κορόιδο	Vangelis Lepouras
1970	The Dry-Head	Ο ξεροκέφαλος (O xerokefalos)	Andronikos
1972	Axiomatikos Ypiresias	Αξιωματικός Υπηρεσίας	-
1973	The Man That Ran Too Much	Ό άνθρωπος που έτρεχε πολύ (O anthropos pou etrehe poli)	Harilaos Zevedaios
1978	O falakros mathitis	Ο φαλακρός μαθητής	Despoinopoulos
