= Joly Garbi =

Greek actress (1913–2002)

Joly Garbi Τζόλυ Γαρμπή
- Born: 1913; Johannesburg, Union of South Africa
- Died: December 2002 (aged 88–89); Athens, Greece
- Burial place: Marathon
- Occupation: Actress
- Spouse: Thodoros Moridis

Joly Garbi (Greek: Τζόλυ Γαρμπή, 1913 – 9 December 2002) was a Greek actress. She was the wife of the actor Thodoros Moridis for 60 years. They had no descendants. In their late years they lived isolated from the public eye in their summer home in Mati.

She died in a nursing home, like her husband, and was buried in Marathon. Her death became known to the general public 10 days later. Thodoros Moridis died a year later, on December 22, 2003, at the age of 98 .

== Filmography ==
=== Cinema ===
Year	Film	Transliteration and translation	Role
1932	Koinoniki sapila	Κοινωνική σαπίλα	-
1954	Thanassakis o politevomenos	Θανασάκης ο πολιτευόμενος	Katina Kaplani
1957	O Fanouris kai to soi tou	Ο Φανούρης και το σόι του	Dimitra
1958	We Have Only One Life	Μια ζωή την έχουμε Mia zoi tin echoume	-
1959	Na petheros na malama	Να πεθερός να μάλαμα	Loukia Delli
1959	O Giannos ki i Pagona	Ο Γιάννος κι η Παγώνα	-
1960	To koroidaki tis despoinidos	Το κοροιδάκι της δεσποινίδος	Katerina
1960	The Papadopoulos Family	Οικογένεια Παπαδοπούλου; Ikoyenia Papadopoulou	Sotiria Papadopoulou
1960	To klotsoskoufi	Το κλωτσοσκούφι	Eleni
1960	Makrykostaioi kai Kontogiorgides	Μακρυκωσταίοι και Κοντογιώργηδες	Thomas's aunt
1961	O skliros andras	Ο σκληρός άντρας	Andromachi
1961	Liza and Others	Η Λίζα και η άλλη I Liza kai i alli	Katerina
1961	Eftychos trelathika	Ευτυχώς τρελάθηκα Luckily, I Went Crazy	Antigoni Zoubouli; Αντιγόνη Ζουμπούλη
1962	Merikoi to protimoun kryo	Μερικοί το προτιμούν κρύο	a mother
1962	O atsidas	Ο ατσίδας	Areti Kourouzou; Αρετή Κουρούζου
1963	Enas vlakas me patenta	Ένας βλάκας με πατέντα	Faneromeni
1964	I Soferina	Η σωφερίνα	Evterpi Karavangeli
1967	Welcome the Dollar	Καλώς ήλθε το δολάριο Kalos ilthe to dollario	Mrs Angeloutsou
1967	Gia tin kardia tis oraias Elenis	Για την καρδιά της ωραίας Ελένης; A Heart for Beautiful Helen	Varvara
1968	I archontissa kai o alitis	Η αρχόντισσα και ο αλήτης	Androniki
1968	Our Love	Η αγάπη μας I agapi mar	Harikleia
1969	I neraida kai to palikari	Η νεράιδα και το παλικάρι	Fourtounakis' sister
1972	Mia mana katigoreitai		-
1982	Alaloum	Αλαλούμ	Thimokleia

=== Television ===
- 1989-90: Patir, yios kai pneuma (Father, son and the holy spirit)
- 1991-92: Episkeptis tis omixlis
- 1993-94: Vanilla Chocolate (Βανίλια σοκολάτα), Mega
- 1997-98: Monachous-Monachous (Μονάχους-Μονάχους)
