= Nassos Kedrakas =

Greek actor

Nasos or Nassos Kedrakas Νάσος Κεδράκας
- Born: November 21, 1915; Trikala, Greece
- Died: August 25, 1981 (aged 65); Greece
- Occupation: actor

Athanasios (Nassos) Kedrakas (Greek: Νάσος Κεδράκας; November 21, 1915 – August 25, 1981) was a Greek actor.

== Biography ==
Kedrakas studied at the National Theatre School, where he enrolled into law school at the University of Athens in 1942. During the 1940s, he was active in a climactic company of Enomenon kallitechnon (United Playwrights) and in the Greek Resistance. He played several times at the National Theatre. Characteristically he was a role in the movie I degyni na fovitai ton andra in which he played as Mike, the drugstore friend Giorgos Konstantinou. He died on August 25, 1981 at the age of 66 from cardiac arrest.

== Proses and sketches during the 1940s ==
Kedrakas took part in art and played in proses and sketches. In 1940-1949, which he was written by Mimis Traiforos, O Romios (The Romans by Christos Efthymiou and Nassos Kedrakas) (sketch). San ti Ellada ti leventomana (N. Kedrakas - G. Sylvas - S. Vebo) (prose) and Ade sto kalo (Kleo Skoloudi - N. Kedrakas - Aliki Zaverdinou - Giannis Sylvas) (sketch)

== Filmography ==
=== As cinematographer ===
Year	Film title (English translation)	Original title and transliteration	Role
1956	Dollars and Dreams	Δολάρια και όνειρα Dollaria kai oneira	-
1959	Eglima sto Kolonaki	Έγκλημα στο Κολωνάκι	Sotiris
1961	O skliros andras	Ο σκληρός άντρας The Bitter Man	Thanassis
1962	Prodomeni agapi	Προδομένη αγάπη	Loukas
1963	Agapissa ke ponessa	Αγάπησα και πόνεσα I Fell in Love and I Got Hurt	-
1963	Mikroi kai megaloi en drasei...	Μικροί και μεγάλοι εν δράσει...	a safety person
1963	I anidikefti/Eftihos horis doulia	Οι ανειδίκευτοι / Ευτυχώς χωρίς δουλειά	Gerassimakis
1964	Itan oloi tous... koroida!	Ήταν όλοι τους... κορόιδα!	Agissilaos
1964	Adikimeni	Αδικημένη	Giannis (father of Alki)
1964	I chartopaichtria	Η χαρτοπαίχτρα The Card Player	Nikolopoulos
1964	Zitianos mias agapis	Ζητιάνος μιας αγάπης	Stathis
1964	O emiris kai o kakomoiris	Ο εμίρης και ο κακομοίρης	-
1964	Allos gia to ekatommyrio	Άλλος για το εκατομμύριο	Charilaos
1964	Kosmos kai kosmakis	Κόσμος και κοσμάκης	-
1964	Exileossi	Εξιλέωση	Madilas
1965	I de gyni na fovitai ton andra	Η δε γυνή να φοβήται τον άνδρα	Mikes
1965	Me pono kai me dakrya	Με πόνο και με δάκρυα	-
1965	A Lazy Lazy Family	Μια τρελλή τρελλή οικογένεια Mia trelli trelli oikogeneia	a worker
1965	Praktores 005 enantion Chrysopodarou	Πράκτορες 005 εναντίον Χρυσοπόδαρου	-
1965	Kai oi... 14 itan yperochoi!	Και οι... 14 ήταν υπέροχοι!	-
1966	I Kleopatra itan Antonis / I Kleopatra en drasei	Η Κλεοπάτρα ήταν Αντώνης / Η Κλεοπάτρα εν δράσει Cleopatra was Anthony/Cleopatra in Action	Kiriakos
1966	O Meletis stin Amesso Drassi	Ο Μελέτης στην Άμεσο Δράση	-
1966	Kounia pou se kounage	Κούνια που σε κούναγε	a customer and a bath worker
1966	O babas mou o teddy-boys	Ο μπαμπάς μου ο τεντυμπόυς	-
1966	O anthropos pou gyrise apo ton pono	Ο άνθρωπος που γύρισε από τον πόνο A Guy that Came Back from the Pain	-
1967	Dimitri mou, Dimitri mou	Δημήτρη μου Δημήτρη μου My Dimitri, My Dimitri	Sotiris
1967	Viva Rena	Βίβα Ρένα	-
1967	I pehnidiara	Η παιχνιδιάρα	-
1967	Enas aneptaros leftas	''Ένας απένταρος λεφτάς	-
1967	Haido	Χάιδω	-
1967	Kapote klaine kai o dynatoi	Κάποτε κλαίνε και οι δυνατοί	a judge
1967	O spafforamenos	Ο σπαγγοραμένος	Panagiotareas
1967	Trouba 67	Τρούμπα 67	a father of Rita
1967	Patera katse fronima	Πατέρα κάτσε φρόνιμα	Sotiris
1967	O ahortagos	Ο αχόρταγος	Manolis
1968	Gia poion cthypa i... koudouna	Για ποιον χτυπά η... κουδούνα For Those who Ring the... Bell	Anastassis
1968	Afti pou den liyisse	Αυτή που δεν λύγισε	Thanassis
1968	To pio lambro bouzouki	Το πιο λαμπρό μπουζούκι The Shininest Bouzouki	a student
1968	Tapinos kai katafronemenos	Ταπεινός και καταφρονεμένος	Minas
1968	Ta psichoula tou kosmou	Τα ψίχουλα του κόσμου Crumbs of the People	a sailor
1968	Poios Thanassis	Ποιος Θανάσης	Prokopis
1968	Xerizomeni genia	Ξεριζωμένη γενηά The Shaved Beard	Iordanis
1968	O trellos tachei 400	Ο τρελλός τάχει 400	-
1968	The Liar	Ο ψεύτης O pseftis	a doctor
1968	Kapetan fandis bastouni	Καπετάν φάντης μπαστούνι	-
1968	For Honour and Love | Για την τιμή και τον έρωτα Gia tin timi kai ton erota	-	
1969	Isaia... mi choreveis	Ησαΐα... μη χορεύεις Isaia, Don't Dance	Pandelis
1969	Enas magkas sta salonia	Ένας μάγκας στα σαλόνια	a president
1969	Fovatai o Giannis to therio...	Φοβάται ο Γιάννης το θεριό...	-
1969	Oratotis miden	Ορατότης μηδέν	an agent
1969	To anthropaki	Το ανθρωπάκι	Apostolos
1969	Pethaino kathe ximeroma	Πεθαίνω κάθε ξημέρωμα	a postman
1969	Enas andras me sinidissi	Ενας άντρας με συνείδηση	-
1969	Wake Up Vassili	Ξύπνα Βασίλη; Xipna Vassili	a lottery agent
1969	The Refugee	Ο πρόσφυγας O prosfygas	Prokopis Artemakis
1969	O gigas tis Kypsekis	Ο γίγας της Κυψέλης	president of a soccer club
1969	O anthropos tis karpazias	Ο άνθρωπος της καρπαζιάς	Margaritopoulou
1970	O gennaioi tou Vorra	Οι γενναίοι του Βορρά	a villager
1970	Zitounai gabroi me proika	Ζητούνται γαμπροί με προίκα	-
1970	O Giakoumis mia romeiki kardia	Ο Γιακουμής μια ρωμέικη καρδιά	-
1970	O astrapogiannos	Ο αστραπόγιαννος	Giorgos Melos
1970	En onomati tou nomou	Εν ονόματι του νόμου	-
1971	Ziteitai epeigontos gampros	Ζητείται επειγόντως γαμπρός	a taverner
1971	Mia Ellinida sto haremi	Μια Ελληνίδα στο χαρέμι	Thodoros
1971	Oi andres xeroun n agapoun	Οι άνδρες ξέρουν ν' αγαπούν Men Know How to Love	Vassos
1971	Agapissa enan aliti	Αγάπησα έναν αλήτη	-
1971	O trelopenintaris	Ο τρελοπενηντάρης	Vassos
1981	O katergaris	Ο κατεργάρης	Thrassivoulos
1971	Katahrissis exousias	Κατάχρησις εξουσίας	a taverner
1972	O kyrios stathmarchis	Ο κύριος σταθμάρχης	Adonis
1972	O echthros tou laou	Ο εχθρός του λαού	Anestis
