= Giorgos Velentzas =

Greek actor and broadcaster (1927–2015)

- Γιώργος Βελέντζας
- Born: Georgios Velentzas; 4 December 1927; Goudi, Athens, Greece
- Died: 20 July 2015 (aged 87); Athens, Greece
- Resting place: Zografos Cemetery
- Citizenship: Greece
- Education: Athens Conservatoire
- Occupations: Actor; broadcaster
- Years active: 1948–2011
- Employer: Finos Film
- Spouse: Bella Papapetrou (m. 1965; died 2005)
- Children: 1
- Awards: Greek State Film Awards (1993)

Georgios Velentzas (Greek: Γεώργιος Βελέντζας; 4 December 1927 – 20 July 2015) was a Greek actor and broadcaster.

== Biography ==
Velentzas was born on 4 December 1927 in the Goudi neighbourhood of Athens. He studied at the Dramatic School at the Athens Odeum. He starred in the movie Ochyro 27 in 1948 and made his first in his emphasis in the cinema and at the theatre in 1948 (V. Argyropoulou Company) with the work I apagogi tou Smaragdos. He also worked alongside the companies of Vembo, Avlonitis, Vasileiadou, Rizos, Voutsas, Chatzichristos, Veggos, etc. He is characteristically made a role in the movie Apo pou pana gia to havouza, in which his brother of unforgotten Anna Mantzourani in the movie The Charlatan with Thanassia Veggos, he also starred with his father master-Lefteris, Velentzas did several police roles. He also starred as a soldier for many times, mostly as a police role. He was educated with a great voice, in many Greek movies from 1950 until 1970 and he also dubbed for television (Little House on the Prairie), he also made an important speech at the radio. For his appearance in Zoi harisameni in 1993 he won the award for his second role at the Thessaloniki Greek Film Festival. He also appeared in the ANT1 program Konstantinou and Elenis as the father of Matina.

He married make-up artist Bella Papapetrou in 1965, and they had a son, Thanos (b. 1966). Bella quit her work in 1991 because of failing health, and she died 2005.

Velentzas died at his Athens home on 20 July 2015, at age 87, with his son by his side. He was buried on 22 July 2015 at Zografos Cemetery.

== Filmography ==
=== Film ===
| Year | Film | Transliteration and translation | Role |
|---|---|---|---|
| 1958 | An Italian in Greece | Μια Ιταλίδα στην Ελλάδα; Mia Italia stin Ellada | - |
| 1959 | A Liar and a Half | Ένας βλάκας και μισός Enas vlakas ke missos | - |
| 1959 | Bouboulina | Μπουμπουλίνα | - |
| 1959 | O Giannos ki i Pagona | Ο Γιάννος κι η Παγώνα | Mitros |
| 1960 | I Hioniati kai ta 7 gerondopalikara | Η Χιονάτη και τα 7 γεροντοπαλλίκαρα | - |
| 1960 | Christina | Χριστίνα | an officer |
| 1961 | Woe to the Young | Αλλοίμονο στους νέους Alloimono stous neous | a doctor |
| 1961 | Out You Thieves | Έξω οι κλέφτες Exo i kleftes | - |
| 1961 | Lost Dreams | Χαμένα όνειρα Hamena onira | - |
| 1962 | Eteria thavmaton | Εταιρία θαυμάτων | a warden |
| 1962 | Douleies tou podariou | Δουλειές του ποδαριού | - |
| 1962 | The Traveller | Ο ταξιτζής O taxitzis | Kosmas |
| 1962 | Koroido gambre | Κορόιδο γαμπρέ Liar, Husband | - |
| 1963 | I Love and it Hurts | Αγάπησα και πόνεσα Agapisa ke ponesa | Menelaos |
| 1963 | Etsi itan i zoi mou | Έτσι ήταν η ζωή μου | Christos Asikoglou |
| 1963 | Htypokardia sto thranio | Χτυποκάρδια στο θρανίο | - |
| 1963 | I anidikevti / Evtyhos horis douleia | Οι ανειδίκευτοι / Ευτυχώς χωρίς δουλειά | - |
| 1963 | O tavromachos prochorei... | Ο ταυρομάχος προχωρεί!.. | Panagos |
| 1963 | O kyrios pterarchos | Ο κύριος πτέραρχος | Aristos |
| 1963 | O anipsios mou o Manolis | Ο ανηψιός μου ο Μανώλης | Kostas |
| 1963 | Between two loves | Ανάμεσα σε δυο αγάπες Anamesa se dyo agapes | conspirator |
| 1964 | Adikimeni | Αδικημένη | - |
| 1964 | I Soferina | Η σωφερίνα | photographer |
| 1964 | Out Goes the Poor With A Great Heart | Έξω φτώχεια και καλή καρδιά Exo ftochria kai kali kardia | an officer |
| 1964 | Ponessa poly gia sena | Πόνεσα πολύ για σένα | Anestis Mardjikas |
| 1964 | O paras kai o foukaras | Ο παράς και ο φουκαράς | Thanassis |
| 1964 | Something is Burning | Κάτι να καίει Kati na kaiei | receptionist |
| 1965 | Moderna Stachtopoula | Μοντέρνα Σταχτοπούτα | Stavros |
| 1965 | To fylachto tis manas | Το φυλαχτό της μάνας | - |
| 1965 | Praktores 005 enantion Chrysopodarou | Πράκτορες 005 εναντίον Χρυσοπόδαρου | 1965 |
| 1965 | Eftyvhos... trelathika! | Ευτυχώς... τρελάθηκα! | a warden |
| 1966 | Dokimassia | Δοκιμασία | Eleftheriou |
| 1966 | O Meletis sti Amesso Drassi | Μελέτης στην Άμεσο Δράση | - |
| 1966 | The Man That Returned From the Pain | Ο άνθρωπος που γύρισε από τον πόνο O anthropos pou gyrise apo ton pono | - |
| 1967 | Aspasia's Dollar | Τα δολλάρια της Ασπασίας; To dollaria tis Aspasia | Anestis |
| 1967 | Some Tiring Folks | Κάτι κουρασμένα παληκάρια Kati kourasmena palikaria | - |
| 1968 | I kardia enos aliti | Η καρδιά ενός αλήτη | Giorgos Damigos |
| 1968 | Tapeinos kai katafronemenos | Ταπεινός και καταφρονεμένος | - |
| 1968 | Who is Thanassis!! | Ποιος Θανάσης!! Poios Thanassis!! | Pandelis |
| 1968 | Xerizomeni genia | Ξεριζωμένη γενηά | commander |
| 1968 | O petheropliktos | Ο πεθερόπληκτος | a judge president |
| 1969 | Ga tin timi kai ton erota | Για την τιμή και τον έρωτα | a doctor |
| 1969 | Ena asyllipto koroido | Ένα ασύλληπτο κορόιδο | Sotiris |
| 1969 | Lower Class, My Love | Φτωχογειτονιά αγάπη μου Ftochogeitonia agapi mou | Stamatis |
| 1969 | Fovatai o Giannis to therio... | Φοβάται ο Γιάννης το θεριό... | - |
| 1969 | The Refugee | Ο πρόσφυγας O prosfygas | a judge |
| 1970 | I Only Love You | Εσένα μόνο αγαπώ Esena mono agapo | Minas |
| 1970 | I tychi mou trelathike... | Η τύχη μου τρελάθηκε... | Gerasimos Panourgias |
| 1970 | Zitountai gambroi me proika | Ζητούνται γαμπροί με προίκα | - |
| 1970 | Ena bouzouki alloiotiko apo t'alla | Ένα μπουζούκι αλλοιώτικο από τ' άλλα | - |
| 1971 | I charavgi tis nikis | Η χαραυγή της νίκης | - |
| 1971 | Ti kanei o anthropos gia na zisi | Τι κάνει ο άνθρωπος για να ζήση | officer Evangelos |
| 1971 | The Men Know How to Love | Οι άνδρες ξέρουν ν' αγαπούν Oi Andres xeroun n'agapoun | Tassos |
| 1971 | O kyr' Giorgis kai oi trelles tou | Ο κυρ' Γιώργης και οι τρέλλες του | Nikolas |
| 1972 | Erotas kai prodossia | Έρωτας και προδοσία | - |
| 1993 | Zoi charisameni | | - |
| 1998 | Enigma | Το αίνιγμα To ainigma To enigma | a student |

=== Television ===
- Little House on the Prairie (1974 TV series) (Μικρό σπίτι στο λιβάδι) - as the voice of Rev. Robert Alden (Greek dub)
- Konstantinou kai Elenis - as the father of Matina
