= Sperantza Vrana =

Greek actress and writer

Sperantza Vrana Σπεράντζα Βρανά
- Born: Elpida Homatianou; 6 February 1928; Messolongi, Greece
- Died: 29 September 2009 (aged 81); Athens, Greece
- Occupation: Actress/Writer
- Years active: 1950–1999

Sperantza Vrana (Greek: Σπεράντζα Βρανά; 6 February 1928 – 29 September 2009) was a Greek actress and writer.

Vrana began her theatrical career in 1943 with touring companies. In 1948 she made her Athens debut at the Metropolitan theatre in the revue Anthropoi, Anthropoi by Alekos Sakellarios and Christos Giannakopoulos, where she performed the song "Το τραμ το τελευταίο" ("The Last Tram"). During the 1950s and 1960s, she became one of the leading performers of Greek revue.

She was born as Elpida (Note: "Elpida" (transliterated from the Greek "Ελπίδα") means "Hope" in English, and in Italian "Speranza".) Homatianou (Ελπίδα Χωματιανού) in Messolongi on 6 February, either in 1926 or 1932. She wrote several books, with the most famous of them being her autobiography Tolmo (Τολμώ, I Dare). Sperantza Vrana died of a heart attack on 29 September 2009, aged 81.

== Filmography ==
=== Film ===
Year	Film	Transliteration and translation	Role
1950	Ela sto theio	Έλα στο θείο Come to the Uncle	Nana
1953	To soferaki	Το σωφεράκι The Chauffeur	-
1954	The Beauty of Athens	Η ωραία των Αθηνών; I orea ton Athinon	Clara
1955	Glenti, lefta ki agapi	Γλέντι, λεφτά κι αγάπη	Yiouyiou
1955	I Kalpiki lira	Η κάλπικη λίρα The Counterfeit Lira	Maria
1958	Melpo	Μέλπω	-
1958	Adekaroi erotevomeni	Αδέκαροι ερωτευμένοι	-
1961	O skliros andras	Ο σκληρός άντρας The Hard Man	Loula
1963	O anipsios mou o Manolis	Ο ανιψιός μου ο Μανώλης; My Nephew Manolis	-
1965	I Eva den amartisse	Η Εύα δεν αμάρτησε	Persefoni
1965	Den boroun na mas horisoun	Δεν μπορούν να μας χωρίσουν They Can't Separate Us	-
1965	Apokliroi tis koinonias	Απόκληροι της κοινωνίας	-
1979	O palavos kosmos tou Thanasi	Ο παλαβός κόσμος του Θανάση; Thanasi's Mad World	-
1984	O glykopseftis (Video only)	Ο γλυκοψεύτης The Sweet Liar	-
1985	Rambo from Trikala (Video only)	Ο Ράμπο από τα Τρίκαλα	Angela
1999	San to spiti mas (TV series)	Σαν το σπίτι σας Feel Like Home	a presenter
1999	Safe Sex		Roberta
