= Yorgos Vrasivanopoulos =

Greek actor

Yorgos Vrasivanopoulos Γιώργος Βρασιβανόπουλος
- Born: 1924; Athens
- Died: 10 February 1998(aged 74); Athens
- Occupation: Actor

Yorgos Vrassivanopoulos (Greek: Γιώργος Βρασιβανόπουλος; 1924 – February 10, 1998) was a Greek actor.

He was born in Athens on New Year's Day, 1924 and made his first appearance in the theatrical play Egmont by Goethe in 1951, in the theatrical company of Dimitris Rontiris. He also worked as a translator in dialogs from foreign movies. He was also a member of the boards of the Greek Actors' Guild, the Actors' Mutual Assistance Fund and a vice-president of the Retired Actors Union. He died after a prolonged sickness on February 10, 1998, and was buried at the First Cemetery of Athens.

== Filmography ==
=== As an actor ===
Year	Film title (English translation)	Original title and transliteration	Role
1963	Something is Burning	Κάτι να καίει Kati na kei	-
1964	I hartopaichtria	Η χαρτοπαίκτρα The Card Players	Yannakis
1964	Amvifolies	Αμφιβολίες	-
1964	Casablan	-	-
1965	Girls for Kisses	Κορίτσια για φίλημα Koritsis yia filima	Paul
1965	Praktores 005 enantion Hrysopodarou	Πράκτορες 005 εναντίον Χρυσοπόδαρου	-
1965	Make Me a Prime Minister	Κάνε με πρωθυπουργό Kane me prothopirgo	-
1966	O Xipolitos Prigkips	Ο Ξυπόλητος Πρίγκηψ	Panayotis
1966	Kounia pou se kounage	Κούνια που σε κούναγε The Swing, Where Did You Swing	-
1966	I adelfi mou thelei xilo	Η αδελφή μου θέλει ξύλο My Sister Needs a Spanking	-
1967	Oi Thalassies oi Hadres	Οι θαλασσιές οι χάντρες	-
1967	Kati kourasmena palikaria	Κάτι κουρασμένα παλικάρια Some Tired Friends	-
1967	Apo lahtara se lahtara	Από λαχτάρα σε λαχτάρα	-
1975	Jungermann (TV)	-	Petros Fanariotis
1978	Apo pou pana gia ti chavouza	Από πού πάνε για τη χαβούζα	-
1980	Thanassi, sfixe ki allo to zonari	Θανάση, σφίξε κι άλλο το ζωνάρι	-
1981	Teach My Child Words	Μάθε παιδί μου γράμματα Mathe paidi mou grammata	-
1990	Enas epikindinos anthropos (direct-to-video)	Ένας επικίνδυνος άνθρωπος	-
1992	Fortress of Achaia (TV series)	Οι φρουροί της Αχαΐας; I frouri tis Ahaias	-

=== As an actor ===
Year	Film title (English translation)	Original title and transliteration	Role
1967	Miniskirt and Karate	Μίνι φούστα και καράτε Mini fousta kai karate	-

== Sources ==
- Biography and filmography from the Multimedia CD-Rom Greek Filmography 1997 at Ethnodata.(in Greek)
