= The Tough Guy (1961 film) =

- Greek: Ο σκληρός άνδρας
- Directed by: Giannis Dalianidis; Andreas Andreadakis (aide)
- Written by: Giannis Dalianidis (from the theatrical play by Georgios Roussos)
- Starring: Kostas Hatzichristos; Martha Vourtsi; Martha Karagianni; Kostas Voutsas; Joly Garbi; Vangelis Protopapas; Takis Hristoforidis; Kostas Papachristos; Sperantza Vrana
- Distributed by: Finos Film
- Release date: 30 October 1961
- Running time: 74 minutes
- Country: Greece
- Language: Greek

The Tough Guy (Greek: Ο σκληρός άνδρας) is a 1961 Greek comedy film produced by Finos Films and was directed by Giannis Dalianidis and starred Kostas Hatzichristos, Martha Vourtsi, Martha Karagianni and Kostas Voutsas. It is a cinematographic representation of the play by Georgios Roussos. In its first week of screening in Athens and Piraeus, the movie sold 38,764 tickets placing it 14th in the 68 Greek films in 1961–62.

== Cast ==
- Kostas Hatzichristos ..... Iraklis Leontopoulos
- Martha Vourtsi ..... Aleka Palli
- Martha Karagianni ..... Foula Davari
- Kostas Voutsas ..... Patatas
- Joly Garbi ..... Andromachi
- Vangelis Protopapas ..... Kalogirou
- Takis Hristoforidis ..... police officer
- Kostas Papachristos ..... Mistos Davaris
- Sperantza Vrana ..... Loula
- Margarita Athanasiou ...... Marika
- Kostas Naos ..... Berketis
- Giorgos Tsitsopoulos ..... Takis
- Nassos Kedrakas ..... Thanasis
- Stavros Paravas ..... police officer
- Golfo Bini ..... maid
