= Kostas Rigopoulos =

Greek actor

- Born: 22 November 1930; Athens, Greece
- Died: 14 January 2001 (aged 70); Athens, Greece
- Occupation: Actor
- Awards: Honorary Award at the Thessaloniki International Film Festival

Kostas Rigopoulos (Greek: Κώστας Ρηγόπουλος; 22 November 1930 – 14 January 2001) was a Greek actor.

== Biography ==
Rigopoulos was born in Athens in November 1930 and graduated from the National Theatre of Greece Drama School in 1953.

He appeared on stage for the first time at the Kyveli Theater, playing an Oscar Wilde role. It was there that he met the 18-year-old actress Kakia Analyti, whom he later married. Together they had a daughter, Zoi Rigopoulou, who became an actress as well.

Later on, he appeared alongside other renowned actors and actresses, including Lambeti, Katerina, Katrakis and Horn. From 1962, he ran his own theater company with his wife, at the Diana Theatre; a year later, they established their own theatre, the Analyti Theatre.

Rigopoulos also appeared on cinema; he won the Honorary Award at the Thessaloniki International Film Festival for his role at Pantelis Voulgaris' film To proxenio tis Annas (Το προξενιό της Άννας, "Anna's Arranged Marriage"). He also appeared on television, participating at the Greek TV series Axiomatikos Ypiresias (Αξιωματικός Υπηρεσίας), Viva Katerina (Βίβα Κατερίνα) and Hamoyelaste parakalo (Χαμογελάστε παρακαλώ). In 1988, he presented the game show Essis ti lete (Εσείς τι λέτε).

Apart from Greek, Rigopoulos also spoke English and French.

Later in his life, he lived alone in Palaio Faliro, southwest of Athens. He died from a major stroke.

== Filmography ==
Partial list

- 1965: Praktores 005 enantion Hrysopodarou (Πράκτορες 005 εναντίον Χρυσοπόδαρου)
- Mia porta drh. 500 (Μια πόρτα δρχ. …500 = A door with 500 Drachmas) by B. Goufas and V. Andreopoulou
- I vila ton orgion (Η Βίλα των οργίων) by Geras. Stavrou
- 'Eimaste oloi synypeythynoi" Pavel Kohout
- "Lady from Maxim" Georges Feydeau
- I Zodohira (Η Ζωντοχήρα) a work by Ibrohoris and G. Papas
- "Agapimou Ouaoua" Franois Campeau in which had a greater and longer theatrical success from 1967 until 1973.
- To afti tou Alexandrou (Το αυτί του Αλέξανδρου = Alexander's Ears) by Kostas Mourselas
- Suki Yaki (Stone - Cooney, a great success of the time)
- An Unnamed Tale (Παραμύθι χωρίς όνομα = Paramithi horis onoma) by Iakovos Kampanellis
- Vassilikos (Βασιλικός) by Kostandinos Matessis

== Notes and references ==
=== Bibliography ===
- Who's Who 1979, p 595
