= Giorgos Kappis =

Greek actor

Giorgos Kappis Γιώργος Κάππης
- Born: 1928; Athens, Kingdom of Greece
- Died: May 11, 1999 (aged 70–71); Athens, Greece
- Occupation: Actor

Giorgos Kappis' (Greek: Γιώργος Κάππης; 1928 – May 11, 1999) was a Greek actor in secondary roles in comedy and movies.

== Film and theatrical appearances ==
He first appeared in Dalianidis' Dilmos and his unforgettable memories of his role was the brother's son of Alekos Leivaditis in O emiris kai o kakomoiris and as a director, which finally unstitches from Lambros Konstantaras in O trelos ta echei 400. He took part in many video films in the 1980s due to its survival.

The unforgettable that he remains in the memory of the Piraeus theatrical partner scene (after the metapolitefsi) went to the stage, the state presented a large closed piaster with raising as much from the inner finger of the edge, in which brought to think that G. Kappis without talking. After the 2 to 3 minute celebration, he also laughed and he said:

Laugh eh!..., Laugh!..., Laugh!... All of us for 7 years sit here above! (Γελάτε ε!..., Γελάστε!..., Γελάστε!... Όλοι σας 7 χρόνια καθόσασταν εδώ πάνω! = Gelate e!..., Gelaste!..., Gelaste!... Oloi sas 7 chronia kathsastan edo pano!

== Death ==
He lived poorly, and died in May 1999. He is buried at Glyfada Cemetery with other relatives. He had a daughter, Patricia.

== Filmography ==
Year	Film title (English translation)	Original title and transliteration	Role
1963	Pseftothodoros	Ψευτοθόδωρος; Lazy Theodore	Mitsos
1963	Ziteitai timios	Ζητείται τίμιος	Sotiris
1964	Kosmos kai kosmakis	Κόσμος και κοσμάκης	Psarokaselas
1964	O, ti thelei o laos	Ό,τι θέλει ο λαός	Aristidis
1964	O emiris kai o kakomoiris	Ο εμίρης και ο κακομοίρης	Alis Sevdalis
1964	Allos gia to ekatommyrio	Άλλος για το εκατομμύριο Somebody for a Millionaire	Aristidis
1964	To prosopo tis imeras	Το πρόσωπο της ημέρας	Apostolis
1966	Fifis o aktyptos	Φίφης ο ακτύπητος	Zoubas
1867	Nymfios anymfeftos	Νυμφίος ανύμφευτος	a train controller
1968	O trelos ta chei 400	Ο τρελός τα' χει 400	Renos
1969	I archontissa tis kouzinas	Η αρχόντισσα της κουζίνας Leader of the Kitchen	Thanassis
1971	To omorfopaido	Το ομορφόπαιδο	Alekos
1971	Holidays in Our Cyprus	Διακοπές στην Κύπρο μας Diakopes stin Kypro mas	Sotiris
1971	O kyr Giorgis kai o treles tou	Ο κυρ Γιώργης και οι τρέλες του Mr. Giorgis and his Lazy Guys	Sotiris
1983	O anthropos pou to paize poly	Ο άνθρωπος που το 'παιζε πολύ	Ieremias
1988	O megalos paramythoas	Ο μεγάλος παραμυθάς A Great Tale	Giagkos
