= Ta kitrina gantia =

Ta Kitrina Gantia The Yellow Gloves Τα Κίτρινα Γάντια
- Directed by: Alekos Sakellarios
- Written by: Alekos Sakellarios; Christos Giannakopoulos
- Starring: Nikos Stavridis; Mimis Fotopoulos; Maro Kontou; Martha Vourtsi; Pantelis Zervos; Giannis Gionakis
- Music by: Takis Morakis
- Distributed by: Damaskinos Michailidis, Finos Films
- Release date: 12 December 1960
- Running time: 79 mins
- Country: Greece
- Language: Greek

Ta Kitrina Gantia (Greek: Τα Κίτρινα Γάντια, The Yellow Gloves) is a 1960 Greek comedy film made by Finos Films. It was written by Alekos Sakellarios and Christos Giannakopoulos, directed by Alekos Sakellarios, and starring Nikos Stavridis, Mimis Fotopoulos, Maro Kontou and Martha Vourtsi.

== Plot ==
Orestis Kalligaridis (Nikos Stavridis) is extremely and obsessively jealous of his young and beautiful wife Rena (Maro Kontou) who, although distraught and offended by his inquisitive attitude, remains faithful to him nonetheless. Orestis spends much of the day outside the house tending to his various business interests while Rena stays at home practically alone, save for her housemaid Toula (Martha Vourtsi) and her friend and neighbor Elli (Popi Lazou) whom she socializes with. Yet, the fact that Rena leads such a leisurely routine in an affluent suburb of Athens with numerous potential suitors in the vicinity further stokes Orestis' insecurity and compounds his fears of falling prey to a conspiracy. The frequent presence just outside the house gates of a moustached man, a chauffeur named Leandros (Mimis Fotopoulos) who acts suspiciously and seems particularly interested in what goes on inside is more than reason enough for Orestis to become alarmed and feel threatened. However, Leandros' true love interest is none other than Toula, who arranges under false pretenses to go with him on an excursion, only to unexpectedly cross paths with Orestis, whose business trip of that particular day is dramatically diverted. The extraordinary circumstances and the fateful coincidences of their encounter, which entail the discovery of Rena's pair of slightly stained yellow gloves on the premises of the rural pub that all parties unwittingly converge on, along with an altercation between Orestis and Leandros, who hastily escapes through the window with Toula, without the latter being identified by her boss, as well as confusion stemming from fragmentary information Orestis gleans from three distinct individuals who are found at different times behind the counter of the same establishment, (Pantelis Zervos, Ivoni Vladimirou and Giannis Gionakis) cause Orestis to conclude that he finally possesses tangible proof of Rena's long suspected infidelity, and rushes home to confront her with the evidence. But what Orestis fails to realize is that Rena had previously lent the outfit which the yellow gloves accessorized with to one of her acquaintances, Annoula, (Niki Linardou) who had requested it for a family occasion she and her fiancé would be attending in the countryside. Once the truth has finally emerged, a phone call from one of Orestis' neighbors, General Chatziantoniou (Kostas Doukas) who had repeatedly tried, to no avail, to notify Orestis about the nascent romance between Leandros and Toula provides independent corroboration and fully exonerates Rena. Still, as soon as the misunderstanding is embarrassingly resolved, Orestis slides back into his old ways, much to the chagrin of Rena, who realizes that her spouse will remain incorrigible, a fact Orestis himself acknowledges to the film's audience just as the screen fades to black.

== Cast ==
- Nikos Stavridis ..... Orestis Kalligaridis
- Maro Kontou ..... Rena Kalligaridi
- Mimis Fotopoulos ..... Leandros
- Martha Vourtsi ..... Toula
- Giannis Gionakis ..... Brillis
- Pantelis Zervos ..... Pub Owner
- Ivoni Vladimirou ..... Thodora
- Niki Linardou ..... Annoula
- Popi Lazou ..... Elli Laskaridou
- Kostas Doukas ..... General Chatziantoniou
