= Kostas Karagiannis =

Greek film director (1932–1993)

- Born: 1932; Athens, Greece
- Died: 17 February 1993 (aged 60–61); Athens, Greece
- Years active: 1960 - 1991

Kostas Karagiannis (Greek: Κώστας Καραγιάννης; 1932 – 17 February 1993) was a Greek film director. He directed more than a hundred films from 1960 to 1991. He was the cofounder of the Karagiannis-Karatzopolous film production company giving him compelte control over his films as opposed to most Greek filmmakers of the era who were beholden to more powerful producers.

== Selected filmography ==
Film
Year	Title	Role	Notes
1960	To nisi tis agapis	director	
1960	To agrimi	director	
1961	Myrtia	director	
1962	O gero-Dimos	director	
1962	Koroido gabre	director	
1962	I megali thysia	director	
1962	Gabros gia klamata	director	
1963	O dromos me ta kokkina fota	director	
1964	Ta didyma	director	
1964	O paras kai o foukaras	director	
1964	Apagogi	director	
1964	Anemostrovilos	director	
1965	Tsakismeni ap' tin orfania	director	
1965	To remali tis Fokionos Negri	director	
1966	Ta mystika tis amartolis Athinas	director	
1966	O exypnakias	director	
1966	I vouleftina	director	
1966	I Kleopatra itan Antonis	director	
1966	Foukarades kai leftades	director	
1966	Eispraktor 007	director	
1966	Artista	director	
1967	Viva Rena	director	
1967	To pio labro asteri	director	
1967	Sapila kai aristokratia	director	
1967	Patera, katse fronima...	director	
1967	O spangorammenos	director	
1967	I koroidara	director	
1967	I hartorihtra	director	
1967	I goissa	director	
1967	Dimitri mou... Dimitri mou	director	
1967	Anamesa se dyo gynaikes	director	
1968	To koritsi tou louna park	director	
1968	O trellos tahei 400	director	
1968	O paliatsos	director	
1968	O gigas tis Kypselis	director	
1968	O asimos kai o diasimos	director	
1968	I ziliara	director	
1968	I agapi mas	director	
1969	O tzanabetis	director	
1969	O Stratis parastratise	director	
1969	O anthropos tis karpazias	director	
1969	Isaia... mi horeveis	director	
1969	I arhontissa tis kouzinas	director	
1969	Enas magas sta salonia	director	
1969	Enas afragos Onasis	director	
1969	3 trelloi gia desimo	director	
1969	O nanos kai oi 7 hionates	director	
1970	Oi gennaioi tou Vorra (as Dacosta Carayan)		
1970	Oi 4 assoi		
1970	O daskalakos itan leventia		
1970	Krima... to boi sou		
1970	I taxitzou		
1970	Enas trellos glentzes		
1970	Empaine, Manolio!		
1970	Ego rezilepsa ton Hitler		
1971	Katanalotiki koinonia		
1971	O faflatas		
1971	O trellopenintaris		
1971	O Manolios xanahtypa		
1971	O Manolios stin Evropi		
1971	Oi egoistes		
1971	Manto Mavrogenous		
1971	Kathe navagio, kai mia kolasi		
1971	I efoplistina		
1971	Ethelontis ston erota		
1971	Ena agori... alloiotiko ap' t' alla		
1972	Kapou yparhei i agapi mou (TV Series)		
1972	Yv!... Yv!...		
1972	Ti 30... ti 40... ti 50...		
1972	O antifasistas		
1972	O anthropos pou gyrise apo ti zesti		
1972	O anthropos pou espage plaka!		
1972	I proedrina		
1972	Ap' t' alonia, sta salonia		
1972	Agapi mou, paliogria		
1972	7 hronia gamou		
1973	The Greek Connection	director	
1973	To pio labro bouzouki		
1973	Ton arapi ki an ton plenis, to sapouni sou halas!..		
1973	O aisiodoxos		
1973	Enas trellos, trellos aeropeiratis		
1974	Tango 2001 (as Dacosta Carayan)		
1974	Orgia se timi efkairias (as Dacosta Carayan)		
1975	28i Oktovriou, ora 5,30		
1975	Vasilissa Amalia (TV Series)		
1975	O metoikos		
1976	Eglima sto Kavouri (as Dacosta Carayan)		
1976	Epangelmaties remalia		
1976	Land of the Minotaur aka The Devil's Men (as Costas Carayiannis)	director	
1977	Efthymes istories (TV Series)		
1977	Koritsia me vromika heria		
1977	Anomalo fortio		
1979	1979 Ta paidia tis piatsas		
1980	Rena... na i efkairia		
1980	Poniro thilyko... katergara gynaika!		
1981	Tis politsmanas to... kangelo		
1981	O Labroukos ballader		
1981	Enas kontos tha mas sosei!		
1982	O Agios Prevezis... kai i papadia		
1982	I manoula, to manouli kai o paidaros		
1983	T'arravoniasmata (TV Series)		
1983	O papa-Souzas fantomas		
1983	O drakos, to prosopo tis imeras		
1983	Hooligans - Kato ta heria ap' ta niata!		
1983	Gyftiki kompania		
