= Stavros Paravas =

Greek actor

Stavros Paravas Σταύρος Παράβας
- Born: April 15, 1935; Athens
- Died: September 15, 2008; Athens
- Occupation: Actor

Stavros Paravas (Greek: Σταύρος Παράβας; April 15, 1935 – September 15, 2008) was a Greek actor.

== Biography ==
He was born on April 15, 1935, in the Athens neighborhood of Tourkovounia. His parents were poor refugees from Asia Minor, and he helped his family financially doing odd jobs. After a successful audition, he entered and graduated from the drama school of ”Kostis Michailidis”, on a scholarship.

During the dictatorship, he was arrested for opposition against the regime and was exiled to Gyaros.

He married a British lady Anne and raised three children, Jonathan, Martha and Vanessa. The first child Jonathan suddenly died later.

In February 2006, he suffered severe health problems including headaches and years of lung problems with his heart in which he felt better.

He died on September 15, 2008, from a heart attack and he was buried two days later.

== As an artist ==
His first appearance in theater was in 1955 in To proto psema with Katerina Andreadi's company. In the early years of his career he worked with Vilma Kyrou, Dinos Iliopoulos and Kostas Hatzichristos.

In the 1970s, he turned with reviews. His presentation Dirlanda which halted and his reason for his exile. In the next decade, he appeared in several classical roles. His first appearance was in Epidaurus in Plutus by Aristophanes.

== Filmography ==
Year	Film title (English translation)	Original title and transliteration	Role	
1960	Christina	Χριστίνα	a hotel owner	
1960	O Thymios ta hei 400	Ο Θύμιος τα` χει 400	-	
1961	Children of the Piazza	Το παιδί της πιάτσας To pedi tis piatsas	Stavrakis	
1961	To drama mias amartolis	Το δράμα μιας αμαρτωλής	-	
1961	Alice in the Navy	Η Αλίκη στο ναυτικό I Aliki sto naftiko		a sailor with a suitcase
1961	The Smart Bird	Το έξυπνο πουλί To eksipno pouli	Minis Santopoulos/Sandopoulos	
1961	O skliros andras	Ο σκληρός άντρας	a police officer	
1961	The Girls of Athens	Κορίτσια της Αθήνας	-	
1962	Ten Days in Paris	Δέκα μέρες στο Παρίσι; Deka meres sto Parissi	Dinos	
1962	O Mihalios tou 140s syntagmatos	Ο Μιχαλιός του 14ου συντάγματος	Michalis	
1962	Otan leipei i gata	Όταν λείπει η γάτα	-	
1962	O gabros mou, o dikigoros	Ο γαμπρός μου, ο δικηγόρος My Husband, the Judge	Giagkos Kapsomanolis	
1962	The Little Watermelon	Το καρπουζάκι Ta karpouzaki	-	
1962	I yinekes theloun xylo		-	
1962	Eftychos trelathika	Ευτυχώς τρελάθηκα	-	
1962	Dimos from Trikala	Ο Δήμος απ` τα Τρίκαλα; O Dimos ap ta Trikkala	-	
1963	Enas vlachas me patenda	Ένας βλάκας με πατέντα	-	
1963	Mikri ke megali en drassi...	Μικροί και μεγάλοι εν δράσει...	Fifis	
1963	Allos gia to ekatommyrio	Άλλος για το εκατομμύριο Somebody for a Millionaire	Stratos	
1964	I Stole My Lady	Eklepsa ti yineka mou	Petros	
1964	O emiris ke o kakomiris		Fifis	
1964	Kosmos kai kosmakis		Didis	
1965	O ouranokatevatos		Fifis	
1965	Kai oi... 14 itan iperohi		Antoine	
1965	Beethoven and Bouzouki	Beethoven ke bouzouki	Fifis	
1966	Eftychos... trelathika!		Stathis	
1966	I vouleftina		Kommotis	
1966	I Kleopatra itan Adonis / I kleopatra en drasei	Cleopatra was Antony; Cleopatra in Action	Adonis Hrissovergis / Cleopatra	
1966	Fifis o aktyptos		Fifis	
1967	O modistros		Stathis	
1967	O hartorihtra		-	
1968	Gia mia trypia drachmi		Stavros, even as Aspassia	
1968	I mnistires tis Pinelopi		Odysseus/Penelope	
1968	I tsahpinis		-	
1968	O paliatsos		-	
1970	O Stavros ine poniros		-	
1970	O paichnidiaris		-	
1970	Dirlanda		-	
1971	To koroidaki tis prigkipessas		Stavros Morros	
1972	O magkas me to trikyklo		Stavros Perivolaris	
1980	A Taste of Greece		-	
1984	Here is the Balkans	Edo einai Valkania	-	
1994	Ippoptos politis		-	
1995	Akropol		Adonis Seferiadis the prince	
1997	Avrio tha xeroume		Thomas	

== Sources ==
- Pinakothiki Feliou, apo to Logotheidis kai Meta, Kostas Papassilios, Ebiria ekdotiki (Πινακοθήκη Γέλιου,από το Λογοθετίδη και μετά, Κώστας Παπασπήλιος, Εμπειρία εκδοτική, 2002), 2002 ISBN 960-417-002-3, p 158-167
