= Giannis Gionakis =

Greek actor

Giannis Gkionakis Γιάννης Γκιωνάκης
- Born: 18 September 1922; Athens, Kingdom of Greece
- Died: August 25, 2002 (aged 79); Athens, Greece
- Occupation: actor

Giannis Gionakis (Greek: Γιάννης Γκιωνάκης; 1922 – 25 August 2002) was a Greek actor in film and theater.

== Biography ==
Gionakis was born in Athens in 1922. He began his studies at the medical school, but was won over by acting and proceeded to study theatre at the Karolos Koun Dramatic School and the Greek Odeon. He became particularly well known for his comedic roles in films, where he was associated with portrayals of kind but dim-witted people. In 1998 he suffered a stroke and his health deteriorated considerably, leading to his death in 2002.

== Filmography ==
Year	Film	Transliteration and translation	Role
1946	Papoutsi apo ton topo sou	Παπούτσι από τον τόπο σου	-
1951	Propantos psychraima (O Mikis kai o Fikis)	Προπαντός ψυχραιμία (Ο Μίκης και ο Φίκης)	-
1951	Ekeines pou den prepei n'agapisoun	Εκείνες που δεν πρέπει ν' αγαπήσουν	-
1952	To stravoxlo	Το στραβόξυλο	-
1957	The Girl with Tales	Το κορίτσι με τα παραμύθια To koritsi me ta paramythia	-
1957	Jeep, Kiosk and Love	Τζιπ, περίπτερο κι αγάπη Jeep, periptero ki agapi	Tonis
1957	The Girl from a Poor Neighborhood	Το κορίτσι της φτωχογειτονιάς	-
1968	The Lazy Girl	Το τρελοκόριτσο To trelokoritso	Pippis
1958	I ftohia theli kaloperassi	Η φτώχεια θέλει καλοπέραση	-
1958	Adekari erotevmeni	Αδέκαροι ερωτευμένοι	Grigoris
1958	Tesseris nyfes enas gabros	Τέσσερις νύφες ένας γαμπρός	Petros Christopoulos
1959	An Uncle from Canada	Ο θείος απ' τον Καναδά; O theios ap'ton Kanada	Kostas
1959	I mousitsa	Η μουσίτσα	Vourdoubas
1959	Enas vlakas kai misos	Ένας βλάκας και μισός	Perlepes
1959	Douleies me fountes	Δουλειές με φούντες	Alekos
1959	Gamilies peripeteis	Γαμήλιες περιπέτειες	Giacomo
1960	The Yellow Gloves	Τα κίτρινα γάντια Ta kitrina gantia	Brillis
1960	Enas Don Juan gia klammata	Ένας δον Ζουάν για κλάματα	-
1960	2,000 Sailors and a Girl	2000 ναύτες κι ένα κορίτσι 2000 naftes ki ena koritsi	-
1960	Erotic Games	Ερωτικά παιχνίδια Erotika paichnidia	Thanassakis
1960	Alice in the Navy	Η Αλίκη στο ναυτικό I Aliki sto naftiko	-
1961	Ftohadakia ke leftades	Φτωχαδάκια και λεφτάδες	Savvas
1961	Stegnosan ta dakrya mou	Στέγνωσαν τα δάκρυά μου	-
1962	Athens By Night (documentary)	Η Αθήνα τη νύχτα I Athina ti nychta	as himself
1962	I nifi to 'skase	Η νύφη το 'σκασε	a hotel manager
1962	Koroido gabre	Κορόιδο γαμπρέ	Loulis
1962	Lafina	Λαφίνα	Liakos
1962	Ten Days in Paris	Δέκα μέρες στο Παρίσι; Deka meres sto Parissi	Miltos
1962	O antras tis gynaikas mou	Ο άντρας της γυναίκας μου	Panag. Panagiotidis; Iordanis Stekas
1962	My Husband the Judge	Ο γαμπρός μου ο δικηγόρος "'O gabros mou o dikigoros"	Sotiris
1962	Dimos from Trikala	Ο Δήμος απ' τα Τρίκαλα' 'O Dimos ap' ta Trikala'	Vangos
1963	Treloi polyteleias	Τρελοί πολυτελείας	Babis
1963	Ligo prin na ximerosei	Λίγο πριν να ξημερώσει	garage owner
1963	I anidikefti	Οι ανειδίκευτοι	Angelis
1963	Epta imeres psemmata	Εφτά ημέρες ψέματα	Michel
1963	O emiris kai o kakomoiris	Ο εμίρης και ο κακομοίρης	as himself
1964	Kosmos kai kosmakis	Κόσμος και κοσμάκης	Makis Karimis
1964	O lagopodaros	Ο λαγοπόδαρος	Loukas Halmis
1964	Yiannis Went to the Beach | Ο Γιάννης τα 'κανε θάλασσα O Yiannis ta 'kane thalassa]]	Yiannis	
1964	Aristidis and his Girls | Ο Αριστείδης και τα κορίτσια του Aristeidis kai ta kortisia tou]]	Tryfonas; Papalexandrogeorgakopoulos	
1964	Another for a Millionaire	Άλλος για το εκατομμύριο Allos gia to ekatommyrio	Kokos
1964	O, ti thelei o laos	Ό, τι θέλει ο λαός	Thanassis
1965	Tria yperocha vlakomoutra	Τρία υπέροχα βλακόμουτρα	Pashalis
1965	Kallio pente kai sto heri	Κάλλιο πέντε και στο χέρι	Lakis Poures
1964	I Eva den amartise	Η Εύα δεν αμάρτησε	Menelaos Touloubas
1965	Praktores 005 enantion Chrysopodarou	Πράκτορες 005 εναντίον Χρυσοπόδαρου	-
1965	O tetraperatos	Ο τετραπέρατος	Avgerinos
1966	All the Men Are the Same	Όλοι οι άνδρες είναι ίδιοι Oli i andres ine idii	Giorgos
1966	O adelfos mou o trelaras	Ο αδελφός μου ο τρελάρας	Fidias
1966	I adelfi mou thelei xylo	Η αδελφή μου θέλει ξύλο	Spyros Dokos
1967	Enas apentaros leftas	Ένας απένταρος λεφτάς	Giannis Birdas
1967	O gabros mou, o proikothiras	Ο γαμπρός μου, ο προικοθήρας	Babis
1967	O koroidara	Η κοροϊδάρα	-
1967	O achortagos	Ο αχόρταγος	Christos Chrysafis
1967	Miniskirts and Karate	Μίνι φούστα και καράτε Mini fousta kai karate	Takis Koulis
1967	To ploio tis charas	Το πλοίο της χαράς The Lucky Ship	Tom Loukas
1967	Nymfios anymfevtos	Νυμφίος ανύμφευτος	Eftychios Lapakis
1967	Five Ladies for a Guy	Πέντε γυναίκες για έναν άνδρα Pente gynaikes gia enan andra	Dimitris Pappas
1968	O petheropliktos	Ο πεθερόπληκτος	Hristos
1969	I orea tou kourea	Η ωραία του κουρέα	Giannis Psalidas
1969	To stravoxylo	Το στραβόξυλο	Nikos Maroulis
1970	I tychi mou trelathike	Η τύχη μου τρελάθηκε	Zissis Karafanaris
1970	O xerokefalos	Ο ξεροκέφαλος	Pandelis Karabinas
1970	The Four Aces	Οι τέσσερις άσσοι I tesseris assoi	-
1971	I krevatomourmoura	Η κρεβατομουρμούρα	Savvas Tsiflikis
1972	O anthropos pou espage plaka	Ο άνθρωπος που έσπαγε πλάκα	Zaharias
1971	Ena agori... alloiotiko ap' t' alla	Ένα αγόρι... αλλοιώτικο απ' τ' άλλα	Petros Sofianos
1971	Barbara the Officer	Τροχονόμος Βαρβάρα; Trohonomos Varvara	-
1981	Koroido Romiet	Κορόιδο Ρωμιέ	Potis Pikoulas
1982	Roda, tsanta kai kopana	Ρόδα, τσάντα και κοπάνα	-
1982	Roda, tsanta kai kopana	Ρόδα, τσάντα και κοπάνα 2	-
1983	O Papasouzas	Ο Παπασούζας	-
1983	Gyftiki kompania	Γύφτική κομπανία	-
1983	Serifis, o michanofagos	Σερίφης, ο μηχανοφάγος	-
