= Thanasis Veggos =

Greek actor and filmmaker (1927–2011)

- Θανάσης Βέγγος
- Veggos in Help! It's Vengos, Overt Agent '000' (1967)
- Born: Athanasios Vegkos; 29 May 1927; Neo Faliro, Piraeus, Greece
- Died: 3 May 2011 (aged 83); Red Cross Hospital, Athens, Greece
- Citizenship: Greece
- Occupations: Actor; film director; producer; comedian; entrepreneur; singer
- Years active: 1954–2010
- Employer: Finos Film
- Organization: Thanasis Vengos Tainies Geliou
- Spouse: Asimina Karydi (m. 1956)
- Children: 2
- Awards: Thessaloniki Film Festival (1971, 1972, 1973); Greek State Film Awards (1991); Thessaloniki International Film Festival (1993); Order of the Phoenix (2008); Hellenic Film Academy Awards (2010)
- Website: veggos.gr

Athanasios Veggos (Greek: Αθανάσιος Βέγγος; née Vegkos, Greek: Βέγκος; 29 May 1927 – 3 May 2011) was a Greek actor, filmmaker, comedian, and CEO of Greek film studio Thanasis Vengos Tainies Geliou.

He was born in the Neo Faliro neighborhood of Piraeus in 1927. He performed in around 130 films, predominantly comedies in the 1950s, 1960s, and 1970s, starring in more than 50 among them. He is considered one of the best Greek comedy actors of all time. His famous comedic catchphrase was Καλέ μου άνθρωπε ("My good man").

== Background ==
Veggos was the only son of a power station employee, who had fought with the Greek Resistance in World War II. Vassilis Veggos played an important part in the defense of the Piraeus power station when the Germans attempted to destroy it before departing in 1944, but precisely because of this was dismissed from his job in the post-war purge of leftists. His real surname was "Βέγκος" and, as he had said, he wrote it with ''γγ'' because it looked better in the eyes. Veggos himself was a member of EPON, the youth branch of the left-wing resistance movement EAM, and so served his compulsory military service as an inmate on the notorious prison island Makronisos from 1948 to 1950. On Makronisos he met film director Nikos Koundouros who was also exiled there.

== Career ==
Veggos' first appearance in a film was in Windfall in Athens, produced by Michael Cacoyannis, which premiered in Athens as Kiriakatiko Xsipnima on 11 January 1954. Nikos Koundouros gave him a role in Magiki polis in 1954. His first major role was in Psila ta heria Hitler ("Hands Up, Hitler"), 1962. and continued many more films. For his acting in What did you do in the war, Thanasi? (1971), the public of Thessaloniki apotheosized him and the movie won three awards at the Thessaloniki International Film Festival. He often played everyman characters struggling to get by, but he has also played anti-heroes, he has acted in pure dramas, and on stage in the comedies of Aristophanes. His characters were often self-named "Thanasis". He often worked with directors Panos Glykofridis and Giorgos Lazaridis. In 1995, Theo Angelopoulos cast Veggos and American actor Harvey Keitel in "Ulysses' Gaze". In 1997, in the role of Dikaiopoli he appeared in a live performance at the ancient Epidaurus theatre. In 2000, he survived a car accident involving a collision with a train. He later participated in advertisements promoting road safety.

A documentary of his life, whose title translates as A Man for All Seasons, was made in 2004. He always did his own stunts including the most dangerous ones, like hanging from a rope tied to a balcony fifty feet above a pavement without anything to break his fall, walking through a glass door, or falling down a stone staircase head first. During the "Golden Sixties" of the Greek film industry he made his most popular comedy films such as the sequel of Secret Agent 000, Papatrehas, Enas trellos Vengos and many others, also with surrealist humor, most of them by his own company Θ-Β Comedies (Θ-Β Tainies Geliou) which he founded in 1964.

In 2008, Veggos was appointed Commander of the Order of the Phoenix by the President of Greece, Karolos Papoulias.

On 3 May 2011, he died at 7:10 a.m. He had been hospitalized at the Red Cross hospital, in Athens, since 18 December 2010.

== Personal life ==
Thanasis Veggos was married to Asimina and they had two sons. He will always be remembered for the more than 120 films and documentaries that he starred in. The phrase "τρέχει σαν το Βέγγο" (English translation: "runs like Veggos") has been adopted into common usage in the Greek language since nobody has run more or faster than Veggos in his many slapstick comedies.

== Honors and awards ==
- 1962, Hellenic Association of Film Critics Award, from Hellenic Critics Association
- 1971, Best Actor Award, from 12th Thessaloniki Festival of Greek Cinema for the film What Did You Do in the War, Thanasis?
- 1971, Hellenic Association of Film Critics Award, from Hellenic Critics Association for the film What Did You Do in the War, Thanasis?
- 1972, Best Actor Award, from 13th Thessaloniki Festival of Greek Cinema for the film Thanasis Take Your Gun
- 1973, Best Actor Award, from 14th Thessaloniki Festival of Greek Cinema for the film The Charlatan
- 1991, Audience Award, from the Thessaloniki Festival of Greek Cinema for the film The Calm Days of August
- 1993, Lifetime Achievement Award, from the Thessaloniki Festival of Greek Cinema
- 2002, Honoree, Municipality of Korydallos Theatre was named Thanasis Veggos Theatre from the Municipality of Korydallos, Attica
- 2008, Honoree, Evangelismou Square was named Thanasis Veggos Square from the Municipality of Piraeus, Attica
- 2008, Commander of the Order of the Phoenix, from the President of Greece Karolos Papoulias
- 2008, Faces Award, from the TV Magazine of Ethnos
- 2010, Lifetime Achievement Award, from the Status Magazine
- 2010, Lifetime Achievement Award, from the Hellenic Film Academy

== Filmography ==
=== Early movies ===
- Kiriakatiko Xsipnima (premiered 1954), Windfall in Athens (1956)
- Magiki Polis (1955), Magic City
- Katadikasmeni ki apo to paidi tis (1955), Condemned even by her child
- O Drakos (1956), The dragon
- Oi assoi ton gipedon (1956), The aces of the playground
- To koritsi me ta mavra (1956), A Girl in Black
- Echei theio to koritsi (1956), The girl has an uncle
- To koritsi me ta paramythia (1957), Fairytale girl
- Tsarouhi, pistoli, papillon (1957), Tsarouhi, pistol, bow tie
- Maria i Pentagiotissa (1957), Maria the Pentagiotissa
- Tis tyhis ta grammena (1957 Greek film) (1957)
- I ftocheia thelei kaloperasi (1958), Having a good time in poverty
- To eispraktoraki (1958), The little money collector
- Diakopes stin Aigina (1958), Holidays in Aegina
- Oi kavgatzides (1958), The brawlers
- Mono gia mia nychta (1958), Only for one night
- Haroumenoi alites (1958), Happy streetboys
- Kathe empodio se kalo (1958), Each obstacle is for good
- O Mimikos kai Mairi (1958), Mimikos and Mairy
- To koritsi tis amartias (1958), The girl of sin
- O Karagiozis (1959), Mr. Punch
- Gamilies Peripeteies (1959), Nuptial Adventures
- I mousitsa (1959), The cunning jade
- Anthismeni amigdalia (1959), Blooming almond tree
- Ena nero Kyra Vaggelio (1959), Gimme some water Kyra Vaggelio
- O Ilias tou 16ou (1959), Ilias of 16th precinct
- Gia to psomi kai ton erota (1959), For the bread and love
- Oi dosatzides (1959), The tallymen
- Enas Ellinas sto Parisi (1959), A Greek in Paris
- To agorokoritso (1959 ), The tomboy
- O theios apo ton Kanada (1959), The uncle from Canada
- Periplanomenoi Ioudaioi (1959), Wandering Jewes
- To rantevou tis Kyriakis (1960), The Sunday appointment
- Ta dervisopaida (1960), The dervish boys
- To klotsoskoufi (1960), The plaything
- Madalena (1960), Madalena
- Pothoi sta stachya (1960), Desires in the hay
- Erotika paichnidia (1960), Erotic games
- Pote tin Kyriaki (1960), Never on a Sunday
- Treis koukles ki ego (1960), Three dolls and me
- Oikogeneia Papadopoulou (1960), The Papadopoulos family
- O Mitros ki o Mitrousis stin Athina (1960), Mitros and Mitrousis in Athens
- Tyflos Aggelos (1960), Blind Angel
- I avgi tou thriamvou (1961), The dawn of triumph
- Oi enniakosioi tis Marinas (1961), The nine hundred of Marina
- Gia sena tin agapi mou (1961), For you my love
- Mia tou klefti (1961), Once a thief
- Horis mitera (1961), Without a mother
- Poios tha krinei tin koinonia; (1961), Who will judge society ?
- Diavolou kaltsa (1961), Cunning woman
- I katara tis manas (1961), The mothers curse
- Hamena oneira (1961), Lost dreams
- Ziteitai pseftis (1961), Lier wanted
- Lathos ston erota (1961), Fault in love
- I myrtia (1961), The myrtle
- Diamado (1961), Diamado
- Eftychos trelathika (1961), Fortunately I went nuts
- Poia einai i Margarita; (1961), Who is Margarita?
- Liza ki i alli (1961), Liza and the other girl
- Doulepste gia na fate (1961), Work to eat
- O atsidas (1962), The smart one
- Douleies tou podariou (1962), Odd jobs
- To pithari (1962), The earthenware jar
- Yperochi optasia (1962), Beautiful illusion
- I nyfi to 'skase (1962)
- Oi yperifanoi (1962), The proud ones

=== Leading roles ===
- Psila ta heria, Hitler (1962), Stick them up, Hitler
- Zito i trela (1962 ), Hurrah for madness
- Vasilias tis gafas (1962), King of gaff
- Astronaftes gia desimo (1962), Silly astronauts
- Min ton eidate ton Panai; (1962), Anyone saw Panais?
- Gabros gia klamata (1962), Pathetic son-in-law
- Anisycha niata (1963), Anxious youth
- O Ippolytos kai to violi tou (1963), Ippolytos and his violin
- Tyfla na'chei o Marlon Brando (1963), Marlon Brando doesn't compare
- Polytehnitis kai erimospitis (1963), Jack of all trades and master of none
- O trelaras (1963), The nutcase
- To tixero panteloni (1963), Lucky pants
- Scholi gia soferines (1964), School for women drivers
- Oi ftochodiavoloi (1964), The poor demons
- O polyteknos (1964), Father of many children
- Exo i ftocheia kai i kali kardia (1964), Poverty and gentle heart
- Tha se kano vasilissa (1964), I will make you a queen
- Ta Didyma (1964), The Twins
- O Katafertzis (1964), The hustler
- Einai enas trelos ... trelos Veggos (1965), He is one crazy ... crazy Veggos
- O Papatrehas (1966), The babbler
- Voitheia! O Vengos faneros praktor 000 (1967), Out-in-the-open Agent 000
- Pare kosme (1967), For all to take
- Trelos, palavos kai Vengos (1967), Crazy, daft and Veggos
- Doktor Zi - Veggos (1968), Doctor Zi - Veggos
- Poios Thanasis; (1969), Thanasis who?
- Ena asyllipto koroido (1969), An amazing dupe
- Thou-Vou falakros praktor, epiheirisis "Yis Mathiam" (1969), Thou-Vou bald agent, operation havoc
- Enas Veggos gia oles tis douleies (1970), One Veggos for all the trades
- O Thanasis, i Ioulieta kai ta loukanika (1970), Thanasis, Juliette and the sausages
- Diakopes sto Vietnam (1971), Holidays in Vietnam
- Ti ekanes sto polemo Thanasi; (1971), What did you do during the war Thanasis?
- Enas xegnoiastos palaviaris (1971), One carefree wacko
- Thanasi pare to oplo sou (1972), Thanassis, take your gun
- O anthropos pou etreche poly (1973), The man who ran too much
- Diktator kalei Thanasi (1973), Dictator calls Thanasis
- O tsarlatanos (1973), The charlatan
- O grylos (1975), The jack
- O Thanasis sti hora tis sfaliaras (1976), Thanasis in the land of slap
- Apo pou pane gia tin havouza; (1978), What's the way to the refuse dump ?
- O palavos kosmos tou Thanasi (1979), The batty world of Thanasis
- O falakros mathitis (1979), The bald - headed student
- Thanasi sfixe ki allo to zonari (1980), Thanasis tighten up your belt
- O trelos kamikazi (1980), The mad kamikaze
- To megalo kanoni (1981), The big cannon
- O Thanasis kai to katarameno fidi (1982), Thanasis and the accursed serpent
- Trelos kai pasis Ellados (1983), Daffy of all Greece
- Made In Greece (1987) ft. Harry Klynn
- O Thanasis sti hora tou "tha" (1988), Thanasis in the country of "shall"
- Trelokomeion i Ellas (1988), Mad house Greece
- To didymo tis symforas (1989), The duo of misfortune
- Ypastynomos Thanasis (1989), Police lieutenant Thanassis
- O protathlitis (1989), The champion
- Prosohi ... mas valane boba (1990), Attention ... they set us a bomb
- Isyhes meres tou Avgustou (1991), The calm days of August
- Zoi harisameni (1993), Pleasant life
- Vimata (1996), Steps
- To vlemma tou Odyssea (1997), Ulysses' Gaze
- Ola einai dromos (1998), Everything is a journey
- To ainigma (1998), The riddle
- The Lilly's Story (2002)
- Psychi vathia (2009), A Soul So Deep
- The Flight of the Swan (2010)

== Television series ==
Veggos also played roles in televisual series in the 1990s and 2000s; these were mainly roles of an elder wise person, who gives his advice to the younger ones.

- Ta veggalika (1985) ERT
- Astynomos Thanasis Papathanasis ( 1990 ) ANT1 channel, Police commissioner Thanasis Papathanasis
- Peri anemon kai ydaton ( 2002 ) Mega channel, About everything
- Erotas, opos i erimos ( 2003 ) NET channel, Love, like the desert
- Kathrefti, kathreftaki mou ( 2006 ) ANT1 channel, Mirror Mirror
- Exo ena mystiko (2008) Alpha TV, I Have a Secret

== Theatrical performances and troupes ==
=== Performances ===
- O trelos tou louna park kai i atsida ( 1959–70 ), The madman of the entertainment park and the wizard
- Okto andres katigoroundai ( 1963 ), Eight men accused
- Kokkina triandafylla ( 1963 ), Red roses
- Oi ftohodiavoloi ( 1963 ), The poor demons
- Arhodorebetissa ( 1963–64 ), Lady rebetis
- Kypros yiok ( 1963–64 ), Cyprus gone
- Ti ekanes ston Troiko polemo Thanasi; ( 1971 ), What did you do during the Trojan War Thanasis ?
- To vlima ( 1972 ), The missile
- Mam, kaka, koko kai nani ( 1975 ), Eat, poop, shag and sleep
- Peace of Aristophanes ( 1995 )
- Ellin exastheneis ( 1997 ), Greece you are losing your senses
- Acharnians of Aristophanes ( 1998 )
- Ellines eiste kai faineste ( 1998–99 ), Greek is a Greek does

=== Troupes ===
- Mandoubala
- Kainourgia Athina, New Athens
- Anthropoi tou ' 60, People of ' 60
