= Georgios Lazaridis =

Greek footballer

Personal information
- Date of birth: 23 July 1983 (age 43)
- Place of birth: Naoussa, Greece
- Height: 1.93 m (6 ft 4 in)
- Position: Goalkeeper

Senior career*
Years	Team	Apps	(Gls)
2005–2008	Veria	0	(0)
2007–2008	→ Ethnikos Katerinis (loan)	31	(0)
2008–2010	Kavala	4	(0)
2010–2011	Pontioi Katerini	23	(0)
2011–2013	Platanias	34	(0)
2013–2014	Panachaiki	6	(0)
2014–2017	AO Chania	57	(0)
2017–2020	Chania	40	(0)
- * Club domestic league appearances and goals as of 12:43, 25 June 2020 (UTC)

Georgios Lazaridis (Greek: Γεώργιος Λαζαρίδης; born 23 July 1983) is a Greek professional footballer.

== Career ==
Lazaridis began his professional football career by joining Veria in July 2005.
