= Vasilis Triantafillidis =

Greek comedian and singer

- Βασίλης Ν. Τριανταφυλλίδης
- Born: May 7, 1940; Kalamaria, Greece
- Died: May 21, 2018 (aged 78); Kalamaria, Greece
- Other name: Harry Klynn
- Occupations: Comedian, singer

Vasilis N. Triantafillidis (Greek: Βασίλης Ν. Τριανταφυλλίδης, 7 May 1940 – 21 May 2018), also known by his artistic nickname Harry Klynn (Χάρρυ Κλυνν), was a Greek comedian and singer. He was born in Kalamaria on 7 May 1940 to a poor family of Pontic Greek descent.

He died on 21 May 2018, aged 78.

== Discography ==
=== Albums ===
- Χάρρυ Κλυνν Μουσική Γιώργος Κριμιζάκης* – Για Δέσιμο.. 2 versions, Columbia, 1978
- Δοξάστε Με, 2 versions, Columbia, 1979
- Γεώργιος Σουρής, Χάρρυ Κλυνν, Μουσική Τάκης Μπουγάς – Αφιέρωμα 2 versions, Columbia, Παραγωγές Ντεπώ, 1981
- Πατάτες 2 versions, Columbia, 1981
- Μαλακά Πιο Μαλακά (LP, Album, Gre), Columbia, 14C 064-1700311, 064-1700311, 1984
- Έθνος Ανάδελφον 2 versions, Polydor, 1985
- Natin – Fatin 3 versions, Polydor, 1987
- Τίποτα (LP, Album), Polydor, 831 854-1, 831854-1, 1987
- Ραντεβού Με Την... Εισαγγελία (3xLP, Album), Polydor, 839 382-1, 839382-1, 1989
- Αποκάλυψις 2 versions, Polydor, 1990
- Γρανίτα Από Τζατζίκι 3 versions, Polydor, Polygram, 1992
- The X Harry Klynn Files Ανάποδα (CD, Album), Mercury, 536825 2, 1997

=== Singles and EPs ===
- "Αποκάλυψις" Κιλε – Κιλε, Οικουμενικό Τραγούδι (12", Maxi, Promo), PolyGram Records S.A. (Greece), 91184 , 1990
- Χάρρυ Κλυνν, Γιώργος Μαρίνος – Κούλα... Χαράλαμπε – Κάνε Μου Λιγάκι Μμμ... (CD, Single, Mixed) Minos (2) 8243 8 85942 2 6, 1998

=== Compilations ===
- Και Πάσης Ελλάδος... (LP, Comp), Columbia, 062-1700661 1985
- Κλασσικά Ηχογραφημένα (CD, Comp), Minos-EMI, 7243 5 37478 2 4 2002
