= Orestis Laskos =

Greek film director

- Born: 11 November 1907; Eleusis, Greece
- Died: 17 October 1992 (aged 84); Athens, Greece
- Years active: 1929–1971

Orestis Laskos (Greek: Ορέστης Λάσκος; 11 November 1907 – 17 October 1992) was a Greek film director, screenwriter and actor. He directed 55 films between 1931 and 1971. He also wrote scripts for 24 films between 1929 and 1971.

== Family ==
In 1942, he married the singer Stella Greka, whom he divorced in 1947. He was married to actress Beata Asimakopoulou (died 2009); they had at least one child, a son, Vassilis Laskos.

== Selected filmography ==
- Dafnis kai Chloe (1931)
- Madame X (1954)
- Allos ... gia to hekatommyrio! (1964)
