= Sleeping Female Figure (Chalepas) =

Funerary sculpture of a girl

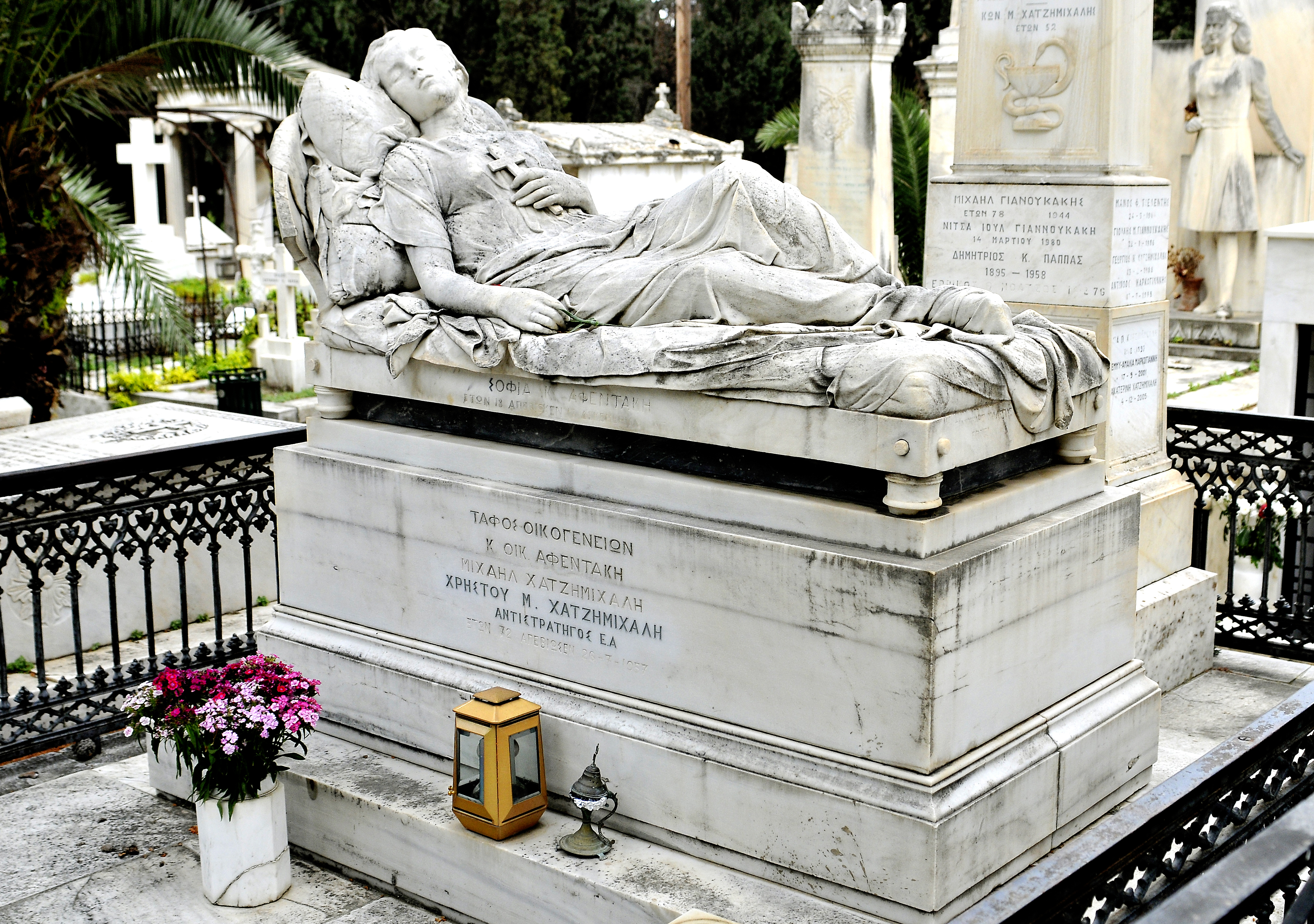
The sculpture on Sophia's tomb.

The Sleeping Female Figure (Greek: Η Κοιμωμένη) is a statue by Greek sculptor Yannoulis Chalepas that depicts the young Sophia Afentaki. It was made in the 1880s and is now found at the First Cemetery of Athens in Greece. The statue depicts a young girl, Sophia Afentaki, sleeping on a couch with a cross in her hand. It is considered to be Chalepas's finest piece of art, and the most important artwork in the cemetery.

== Sophia Afentaki ==
The girl depicted, Sophia Afentaki, was born in Athens in 1856, to a family with origins from the Aegean island of Cimolus. She contacted tuberculosis and succumbed to it on 17 December 1873, when she was only seventeen years of age. Her uncle, George Afentakis, commissiοned Chalepas to carve a funerary memorial for the unfortunate girl, and thus the Sleeping Female Figure of Chalepas came to be, perhaps the most famous modern Greek sculpture.

== The sculpture ==
The statue of the sleeping girl depicts Sophia Afentaki in white marble lying on a couch, on crumpled sheets. Her head rests gently on the richly embroidered pillow as she holds a cross in one hand resting on her chest, while her other hand falls gently on the sheets with one leg slightly bent and raised, so that the sculpture gives the impression that the girl has merely fallen asleep.

The Sleeping Female Figure still adorns the First Cemetery of Athens to this day, while a plaster casting of it is kept in the National Glyptotheque of Greece.

== See also ==
- Leonidas Drosis
- National Glyptotheque
