= Katerina Chalepa-Katsatou =

Katerina Chalepa-Katsatou (April 9, 1925 - June 10, 2004) was a prominent Greek sculptor, member of a distinguished family of artists.

Born in Athens, she was the daughter of Vassiliou Chalepas and Irene Iakovou Kouvaras and was the third generation of the Chalepas family in the field of sculpture, as she was a great-niece of Yiannoulis Chalepas and the great-granddaughter of Ioannous Chalepas.

Chalepa-Katsatou was trained in drawing at the private workshop of the painter Loukas Geralis and studied sculpture at the Academy of Fine Arts with teacher Michalis Tobros. In addition, she trained in marble processing with the sculptor Georgios Mataragas.

Developing her own artistic identity, Chalepa-Katsatou created works characterized by a figurative and realistic style, with a preference for large dimensions. Her figures were born with speed and intensity, often without drafts, and she worked with nervous movements. Her works were placed in public spaces and in the highest state institutions in Greece, as well as in private collections inside and outside the country. In addition to sculpture, she also dabbled in medal and painting. She had a special bond with her uncle, Yiannoulis Chalepas, to whom she dedicated a significant part of her work in preserving and curating the family archive.

She died in 2004 in Athens. Her work, although often underestimated due to its feminine nature in a male-dominated space, is an important part of the Greek artistic tradition.
