= National Glyptotheque =

Coordinates: 37°59′11″N 23°46′39″E

National Glyptotheque Εθνική Γλυπτοθήκη
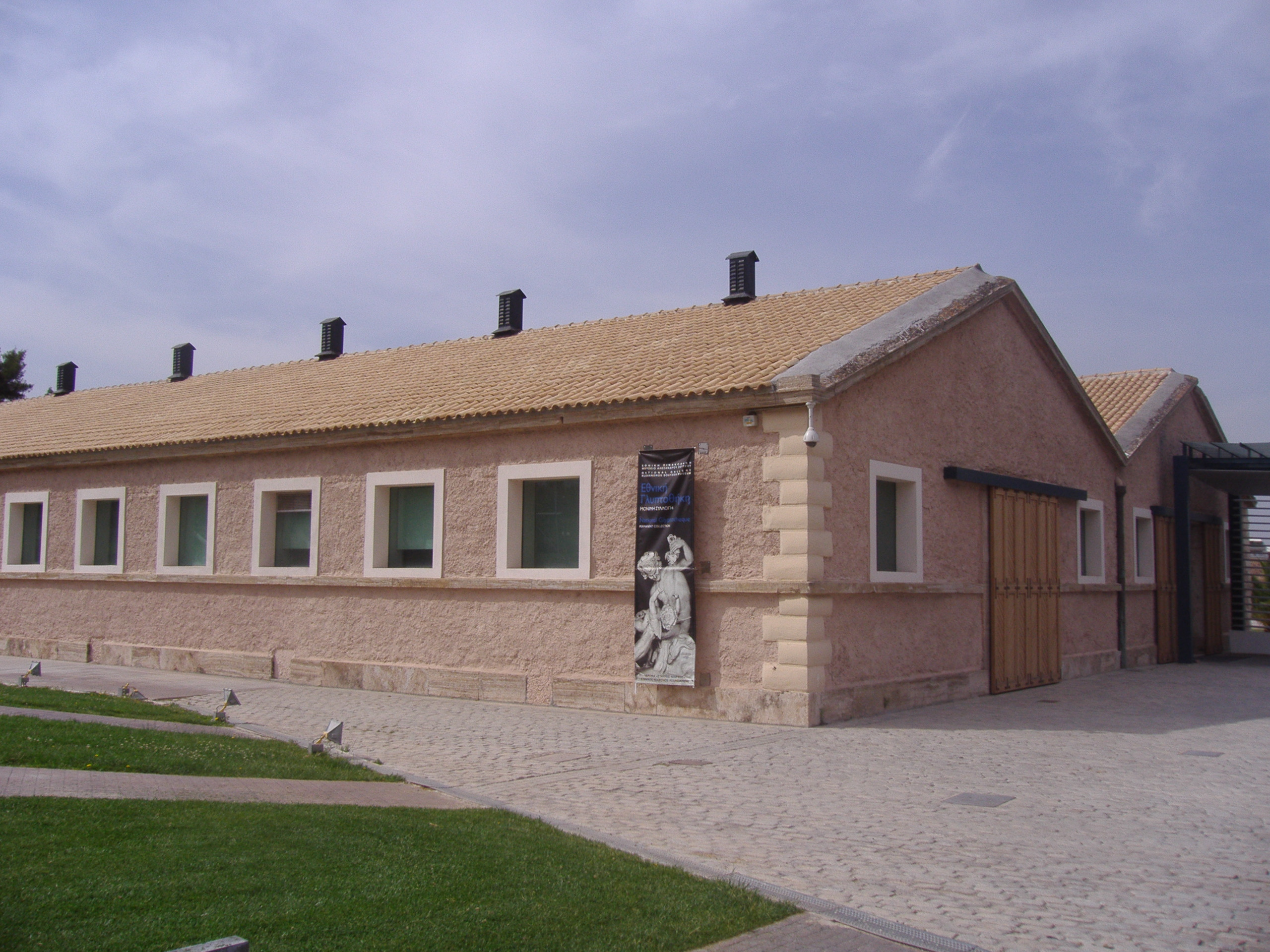

- Location within Athens
- Established: July 2004
- Location: Army Park, Goudi; Athens, Greece
- Type: sculpture museum
- Director: Prof. Marina Lambraki-Plaka
- Curator: Tonia Giannoudaki
- Public transit access: Katehaki station
- Website: www.nationalgallery.gr

National Glyptotheque (Greek: Εθνική Γλυπτοθήκη) is a sculpture museum located in Athens, Greece. It is an annex of the National Gallery of Greece. The museum was established in 2004 and became the first National Glyptotheque of Greece. It houses a permanent collection of Greek sculpture from the 19th and the 20th centuries and temporary exhibitions, mainly of sculpture. The museum is based in two buildings of the former royal stables and a surrounding area of 6,500 m2, situated at the "Alsos Stratou" (Army Park) in Goudi.

So far, the museum has hosted two temporary exhibitions. The exhibition Marino Marini (1901-1980) (June–October 2006) and a retrospective exhibition of Yannoulis Chalepas (February–September 2007).
