= Nikolaos Bourantas =

Nazi collaborator in WWII (1900–1981)

Nikolaos Bourantas (Greek: Νικόλαος Μπουραντάς; 1900 – 16 January 1981) was a Nazi collaborator during the Axis occupation of Greece during World War II in the capacity of City Police officer. Following the end of the war he was acquitted of war crimes charges and promoted to head of the City Police. Bourantas went to become an MP for the Attica and Boeotia Prefecture and chief of the Hellenic Fire Service.

== Biography ==
Nikolaos Bourantas was born in 1900. During the course of the Axis occupation of Greece during World War II, he commanded the 700-man motorized unit of the City Police, which came to be known as "Bourantades" (Μπουραντάδες, "Bourantas' men"). The unit actively participated in security operations against urban resistance groups in Athens, most notably in the suburbs of Kokkinia, Kallithea, Vyronas, and Kaisariani. Bourantas and his men engaged in arrests, torture and executions of alleged resistance members, transferring a number of suspects to the German authorities who in turn sent them to concentration camps. Following the end of the war Bourantas was tried by the Special Collaborationist Court of Athens, with proceedings beginning on 20 November 1945. The chief of City Police Angelos Evert, among other high-ranking police officials, testified in Bourantas' defense. The trial ended with an acquittal of the accused, with the judge D. Golfinopoulos claiming that evidence provided by the persecution was inconclusive. Golfinopoulos judged that the violent suppression of anti-Axis demonstrations was conducted by the Bourantades in order to prevent Axis units from taking matters in their own hands, thus avoiding greater bloodshed, while on the occasion Bourantas followed orders while acting under duress. The case of the collaboration between Axis units and the City Police in the Kallithea security operation was ruled out as an unfortunate coincidence. Furthermore, Bourantas was pronounced innocent in the charge of collaborating with the Security Battalions and ignorant of the fact that his subordinates had handed suspects to the Germans. Finally Golfinopoulos inquired whether the defendant would seek monetary compensation from his accusers for moral injury, which Bourantas declined.

Bourantas' release led to a public outcry over the judicial decision, which prompted the Minister of Public Order Konstantinos Rentis to call for the suspension of Bourantas from the police force and for his case to be reexamined. Nevertheless, Rentis' suggestions were not implemented. Afterwards Bourantas was promoted to head of City Police. Bourantas was elected into the Hellenic Parliament as a representative of the Metaxist Politically Independent Alignment for the Attica and Boeotia Prefecture constituency in the 1950 Greek legislative election. Between 1959 and 1964, Bourantas served as the head of the Hellenic Fire Service. Bourantas died on 16 January 1981, at the Evangelismos Hospital in Athens. He was buried in the First Cemetery of Athens.
