= First Cemetery of Athens =

Cemetery in Greece

First Cemetery of Athens Πρώτο Νεκροταφείο Αθηνών
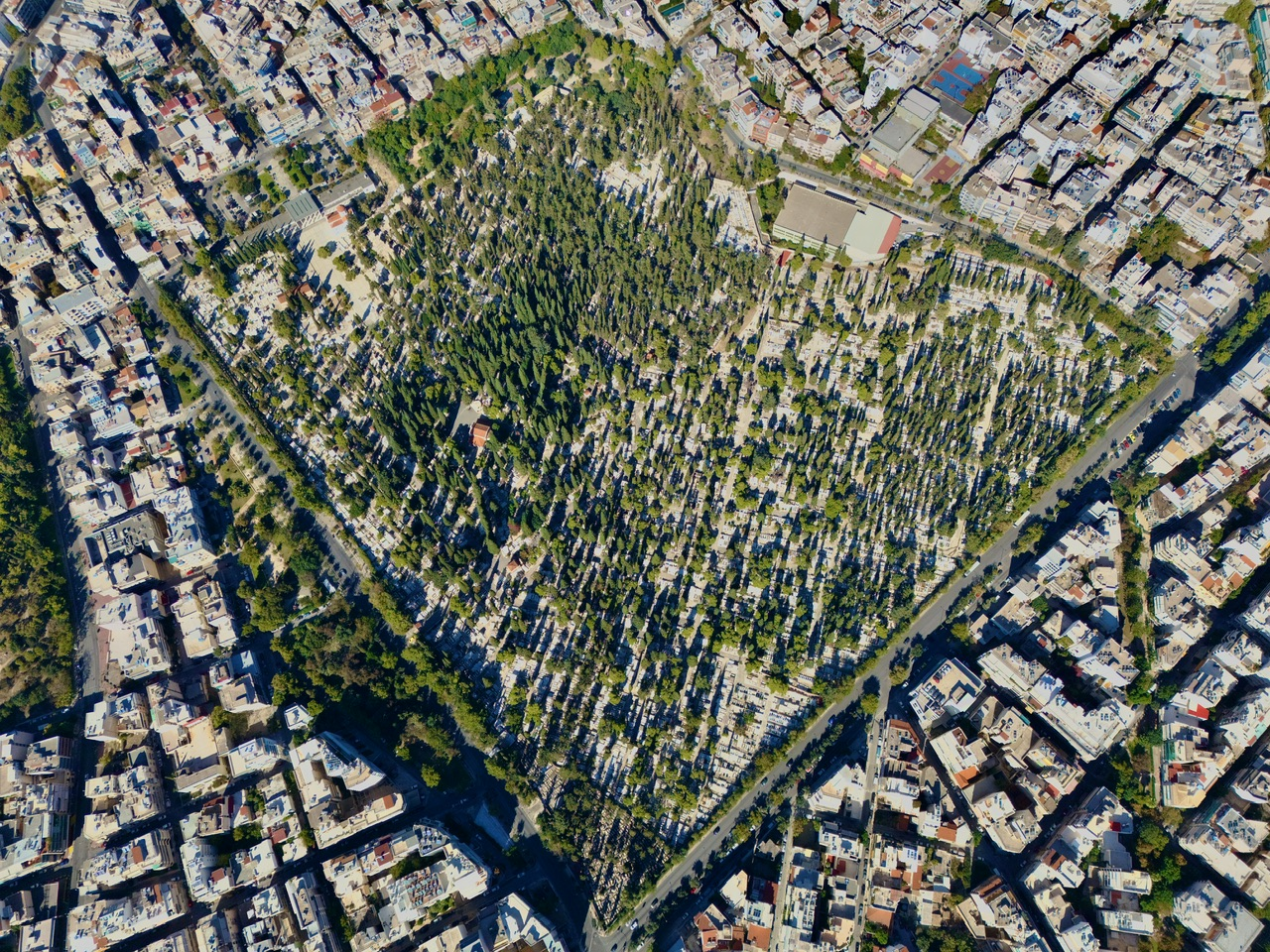
- Aerial view of the First Cemetery of Athens
- Interactive map of First Cemetery of Athens; Πρώτο Νεκροταφείο Αθηνών

Details
- Established: 1837
- Location: Central Athens
- Country: Greece
- Coordinates: 37°57′47″N 23°44′16″E

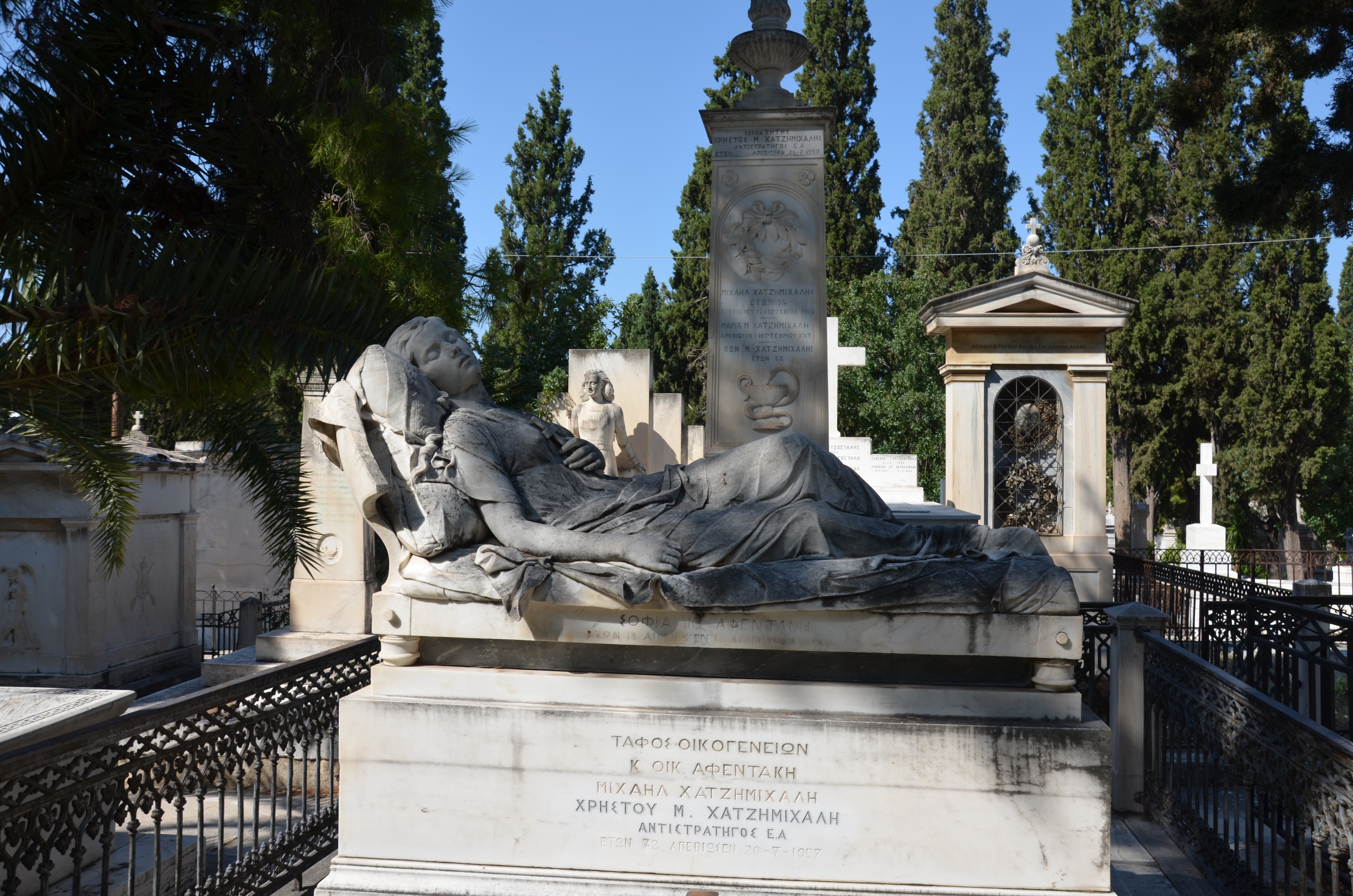
Tomb of Sofia Afentaki with the Sleeping Female Figure statue, a work of Yannoulis Chalepas.

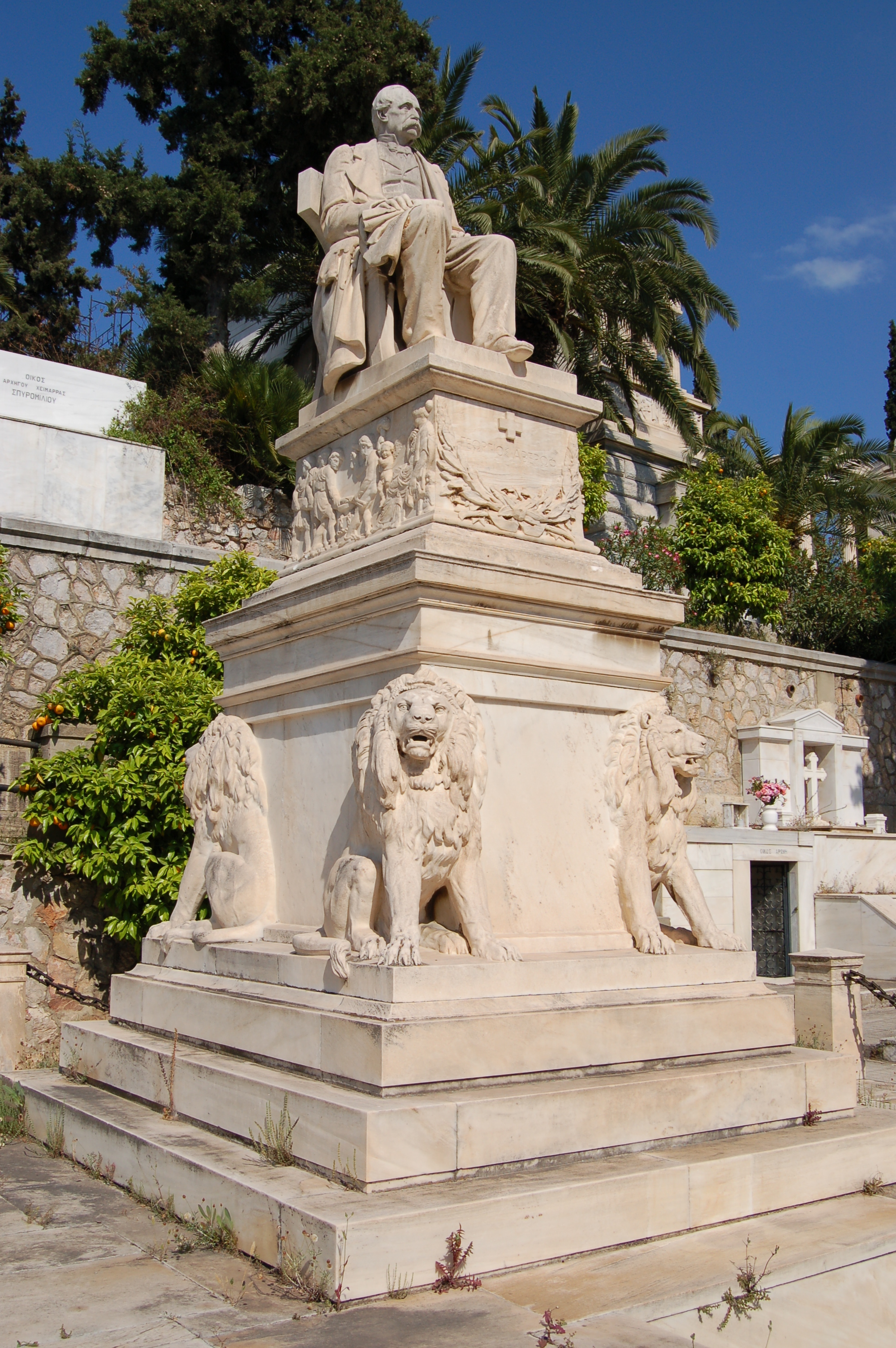
Tomb of Georgios Averoff.

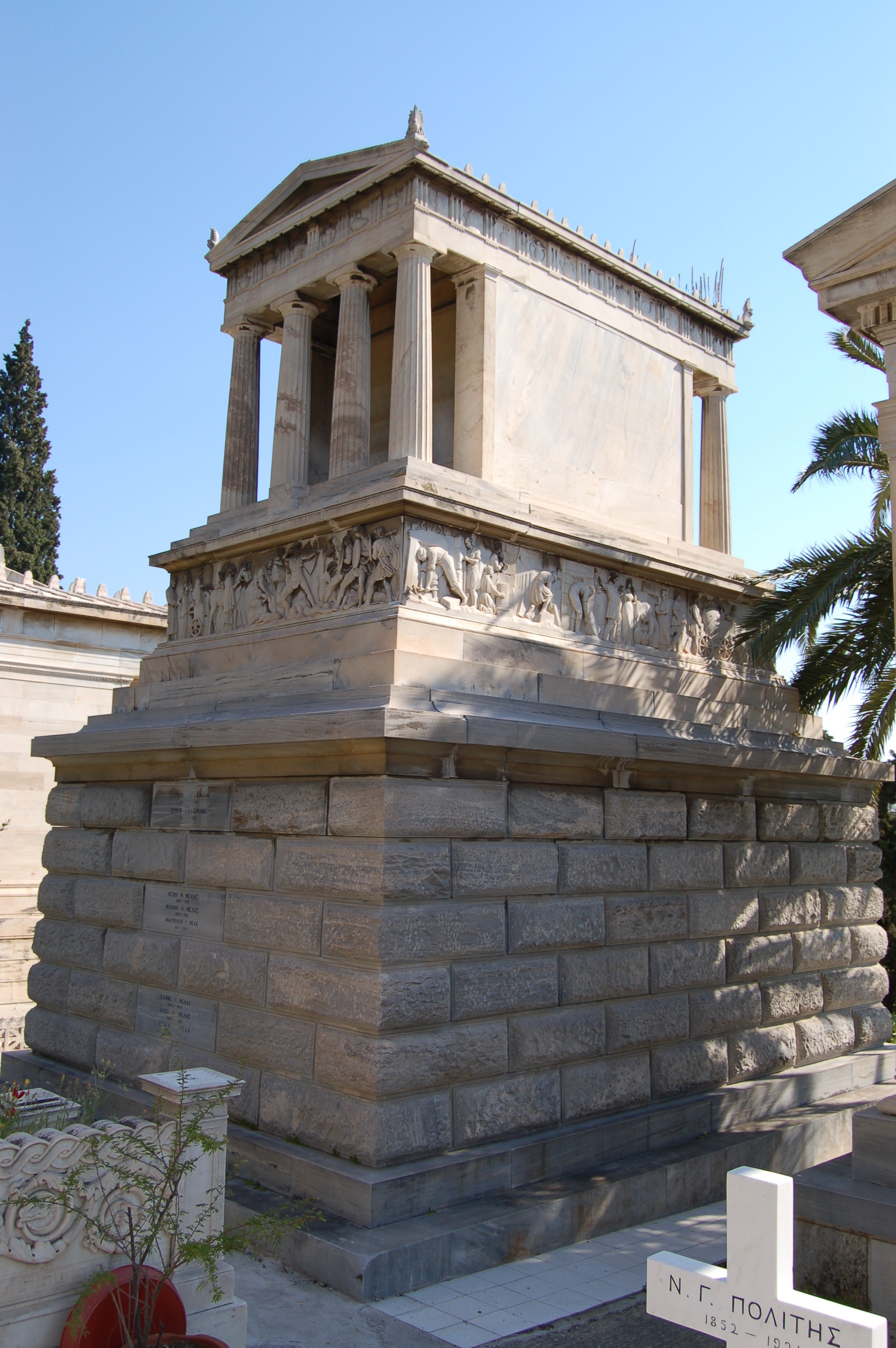
Tomb of Heinrich Schliemann.

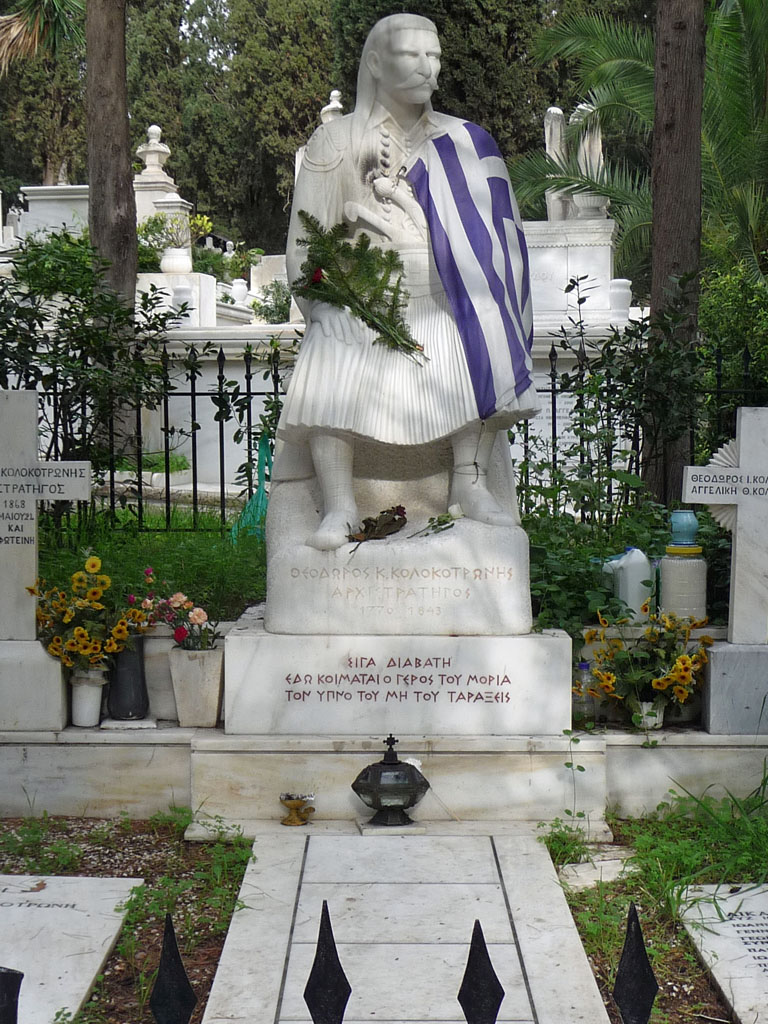
Tomb of Theodoros Kolokotronis.

The First Cemetery of Athens (Greek: Πρώτο Νεκροταφείο Αθηνών, Próto Nekrotafeío Athinón) is the official cemetery of the City of Athens and the first to be built. It opened in 1837 and soon became a prestigious cemetery for Greeks and foreigners. The cemetery is located behind the Temple of Olympian Zeus and the Panathinaiko Stadium in central Athens. It can be found at the top end of Anapafseos Street (Eternal Rest Street). It is a large green space with pines and cypresses.

In the cemetery there are three churches. The main one is the Church of Saint Theodores and there is also a smaller one dedicated to Saint Lazarus. The third church of Saint Charles is a Catholic church. The cemetery includes several impressive tombs such as those of Heinrich Schliemann, designed by Ernst Ziller; Ioannis Pesmazoglou; Georgios Averoff; and one tomb with a famous sculpture of a dead young girl called I Koimomeni ("The Sleeping Girl") and sculpted by Yannoulis Chalepas from the island of Tinos. There are also burial areas for Protestants and Jews, however, this segregation is not compulsory.

The cemetery is under the Municipality of Athens and is declared a historical monument.

== Notable interments ==
- Sylva Akrita, politician and anti-junta activist
- Odysseas Androutsos, hero of the Greek War of Independence
- George Averoff, philanthropist, businessman
- Sotiria Bellou, singer
- Nikolaos Bourandas, police and fire service general, politician
- Yannoulis Chalepas, sculptor
- Christodoulos, Archbishop of Athens
- Chrysostomos II, Archbishop of Athens
- Richard Church, general
- Jules Dassin, director, actor
- Stratos Dionysiou, singer
- Dorotheus, Archbishop of Athens
- Odysseas Elytis, poet, 1979 Nobel Laureate in literature
- Demetrios Farmakopoulos, painter
- George Finlay, historian
- Adolf Furtwängler, archaeologist
- Manolis Glezos, journalist, WWII hero, and politician
- Dimitris Horn, actor
- Humphrey Jennings, filmmaker
- Georgios Kafantaris, Prime Minister of Greece
- Dimitrios Kallergis, statesman
- Konstantinos Kanaris, hero of the Greek War of Independence, admiral, statesman
- Tzeni Karezi, actress
- Manos Katrakis, actor
- Nikos Kavvadias, poet
- Theodoros Kolokotronis, pre-eminent leader of the Greek War of Independence, general
- Marika Kotopouli, actress
- Ellie Lambeti, actress
- Grigoris Lambrakis, politician
- Zoe Laskari, actress
- Vassilis Logothetidis, actor
- Orestis Makris, actor
- Yannis Makriyannis, merchant, military officer, politician, author
- Manolis Mantakas, army officer, and politician
- Alexandros Mavrokordatos, politician
- Melina Mercouri, actress, politician
- Andreas Michalakopoulos, politician
- Dimitris Mitropanos, singer
- Dimitri Mitropoulos, conductor, pianist, composer
- Nikitaras, hero of the Greek War of Independence
- Kostis Palamas, poet
- Alexandros Panagoulis, politician, poet, democracy activist
- Antonios Papadakis, University of Athens' greatest benefactor
- Georgios Papadopoulos, military dictator during the Regime of the Colonels
- Dimitris Papamichael, actor and director
- Alexandros Papanastasiou, lawyer
- Andreas Papandreou, Prime Minister of Greece
- George Papandreou, Prime Minister of Greece
- Kalliroi Parren, feminist
- Katina Paxinou, actress
- George Polk, American journalist murdered during the Greek Civil War
- Théodore Ralli, painter
- Alexandros Rizos Rangavis, poet
- Georgios Roubanis, athlete
- Demis Roussos, singer
- Alekos Sakellarios, director, screenwriter, lyricist
- Rita Sakellariou, singer
- Christos Sartzetakis, President of Greece
- Dionysis Savvopoulos, singer
- Heinrich Schliemann, amateur archaeologist who excavated the site of Troy
- Sophia Schliemann, his second wife, philanthropist
- Giorgos Seferis, poet
- Seraphim, Archbishop of Athens
- Angelos Sikelianos, poet
- Costas Simitis, Prime Minister of Greece
- Spyros Spyromilios, military officer
- Michael Tositsas, benefactor
- Charilaos Trikoupis, Prime Minister of Greece
- Antonis Tritsis, Mayor of Athens
- Vassilis Tsitsanis, rebetiko composer
- Ioannis Varvakis, member of Filiki Eteria
- Thanasis Veggos, actor
- Sofia Vembo, singer
- Aliki Vougiouklaki, actress
- T.H. White, author
- Emmanuil Xanthos, a founder of the Filiki Eteria
- Nikos Xilouris, singer and composer
- Nikos Zachariadis, politician, General Secretary of the Communist Party of Greece (KKE) from 1931 to 1956
- Napoleon Zervas, Hellenic Army officer and WWII resistance leader
- Ernst Ziller, architect
- Xenophon Zolotas, Prime Minister of Greece

== Gallery ==
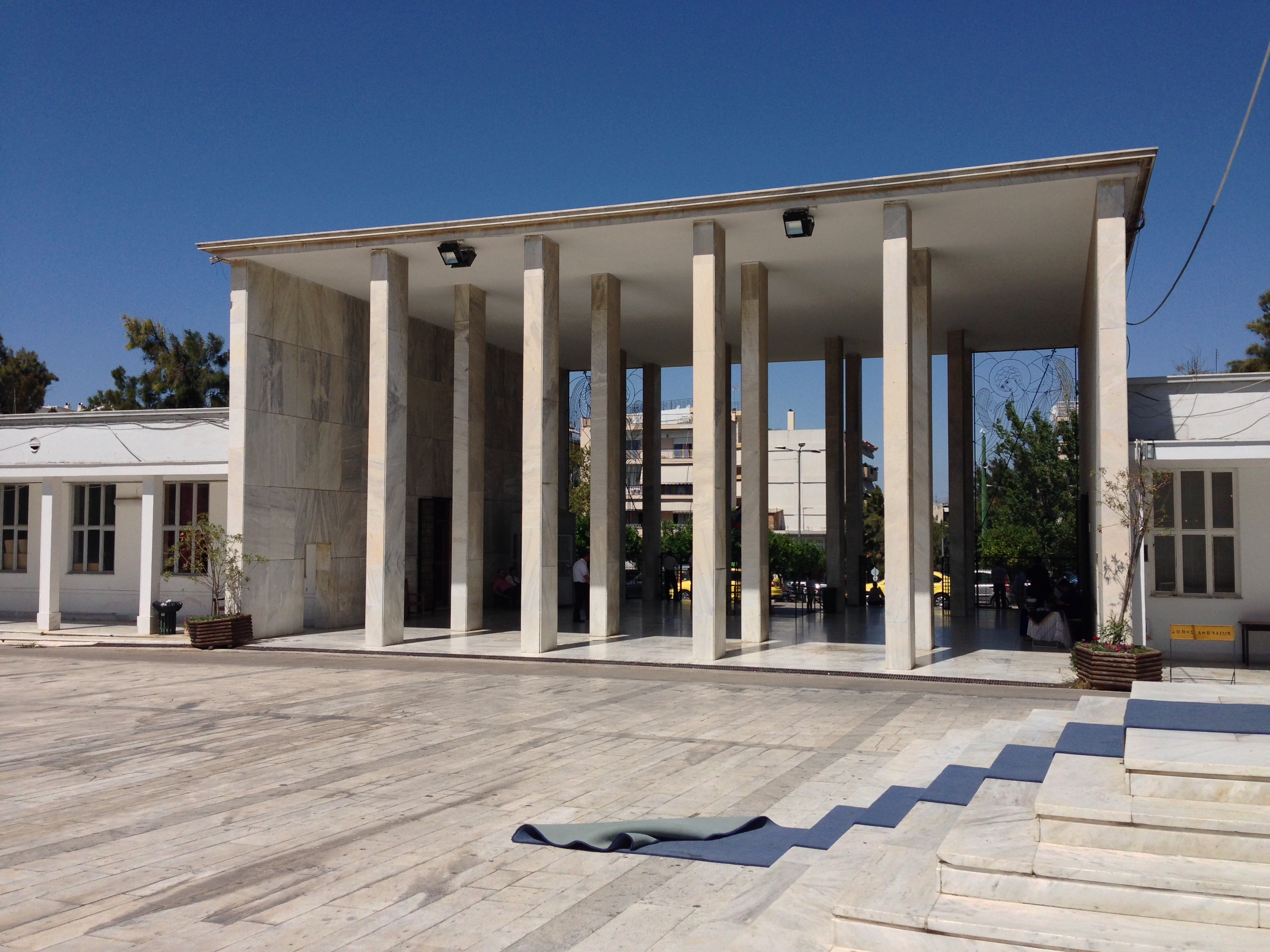
Entrance

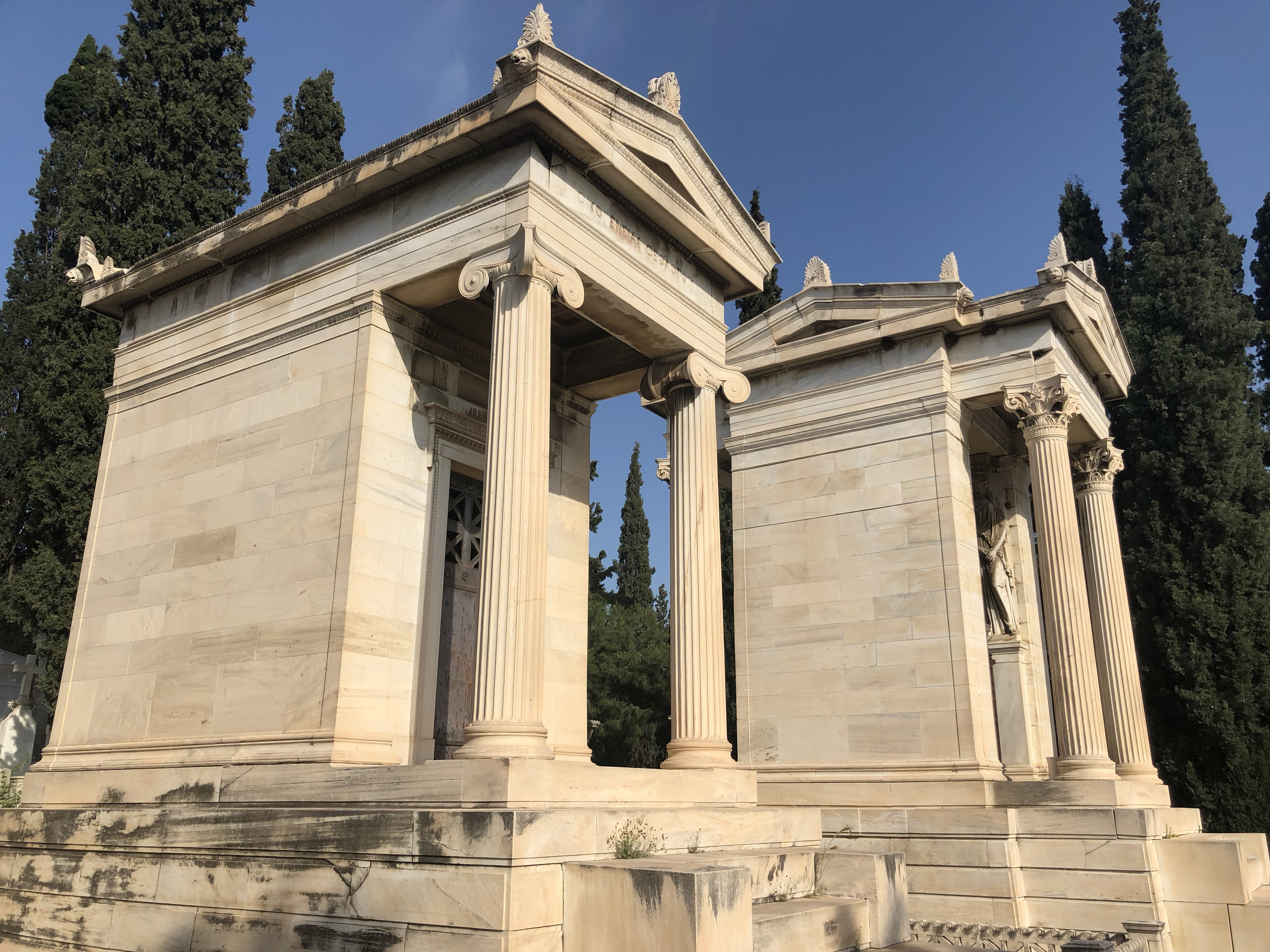
Graves at the First Cemetery of Athens

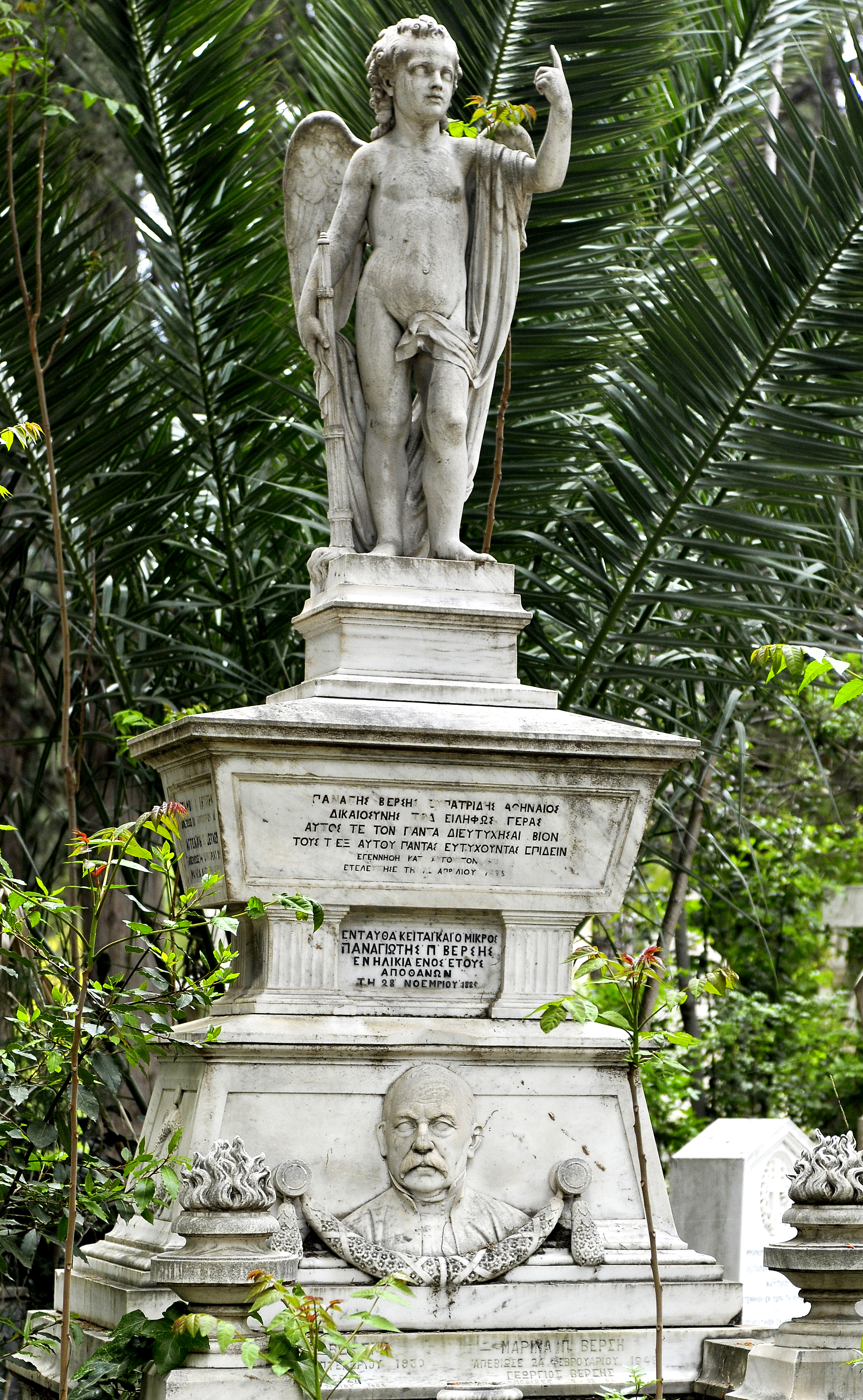
Angel statue

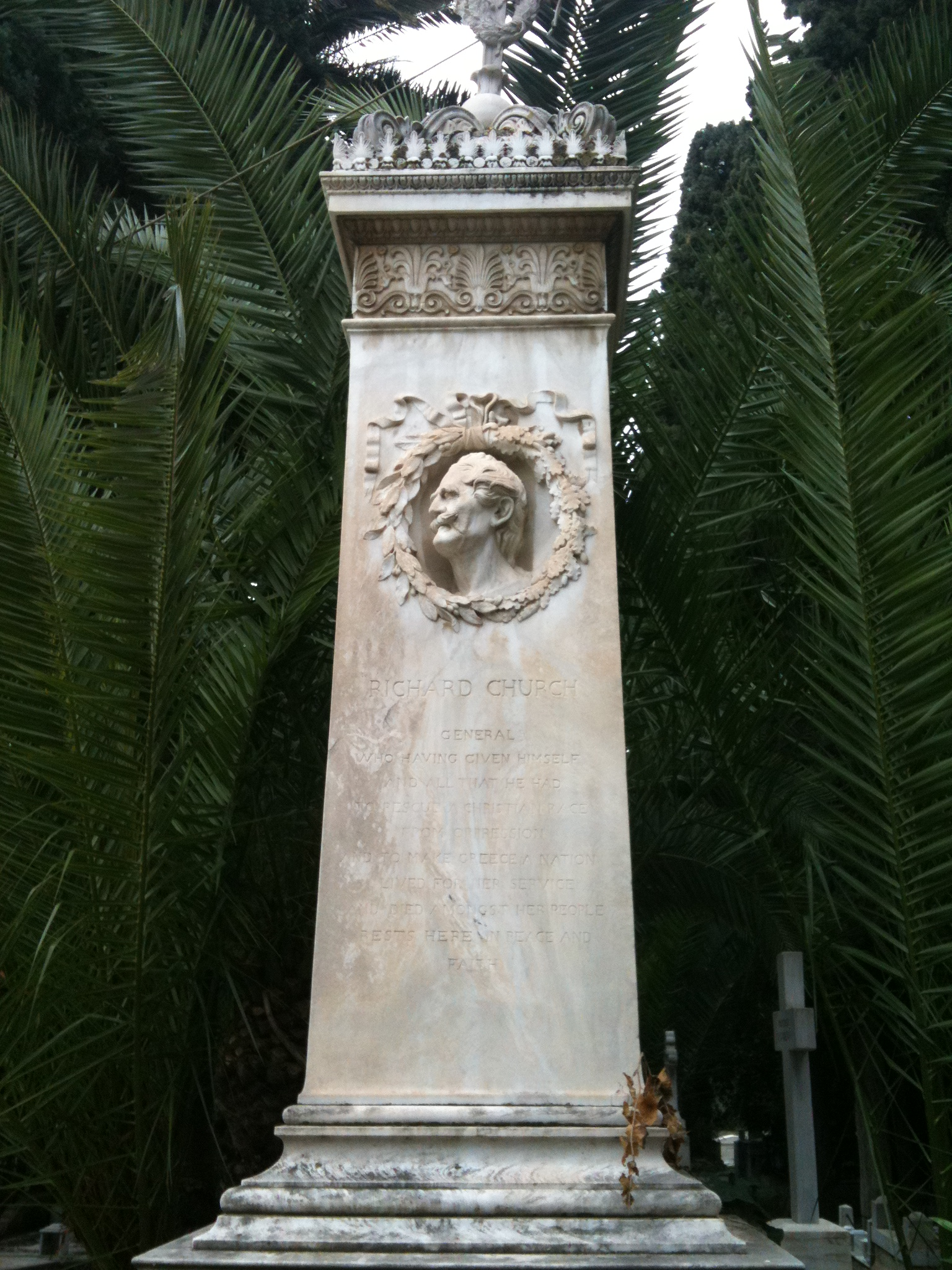
Grave of Richard Church

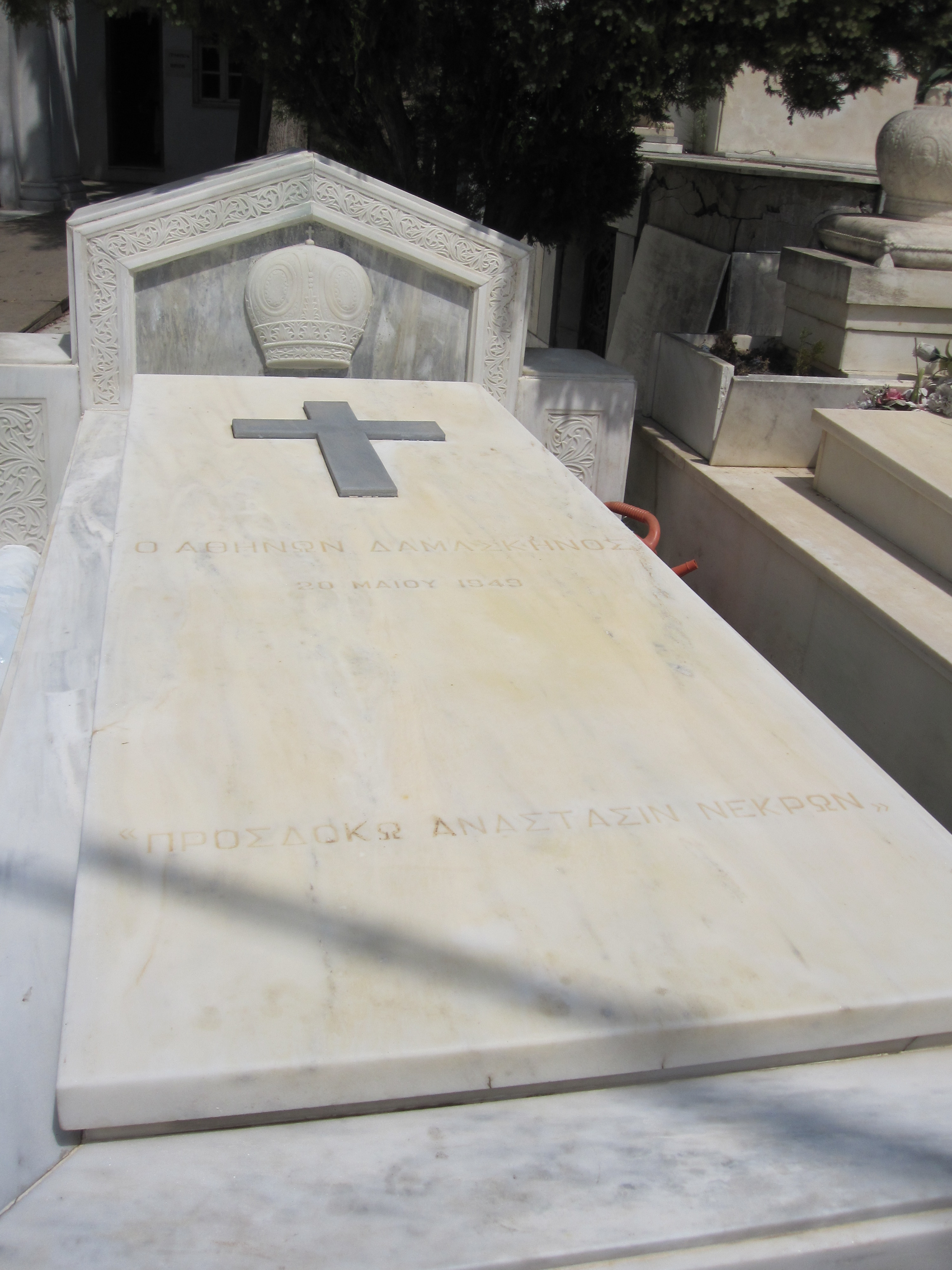
Grave of Damaskinos of Athens

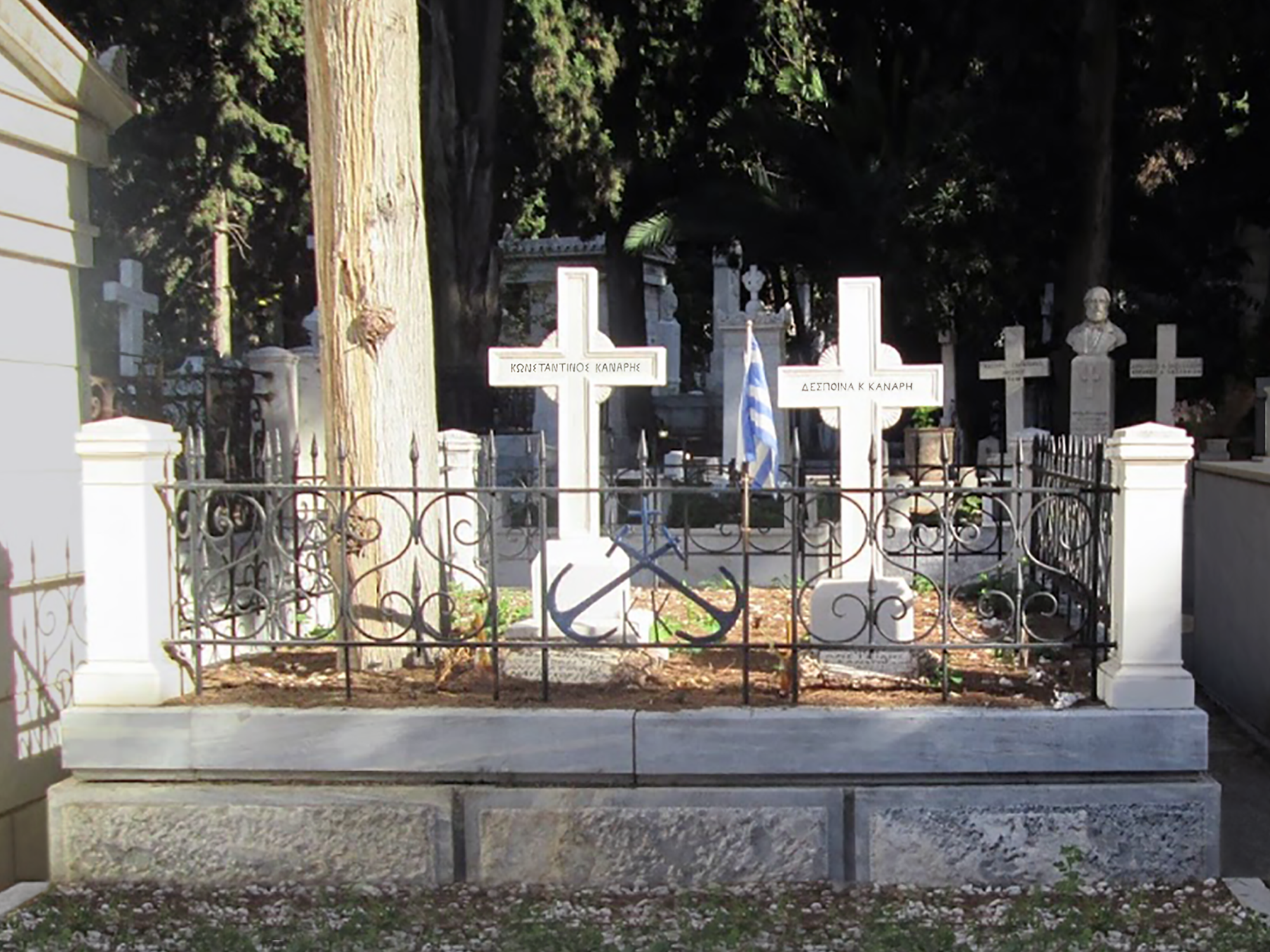
Grave of Konstantinos Kanaris

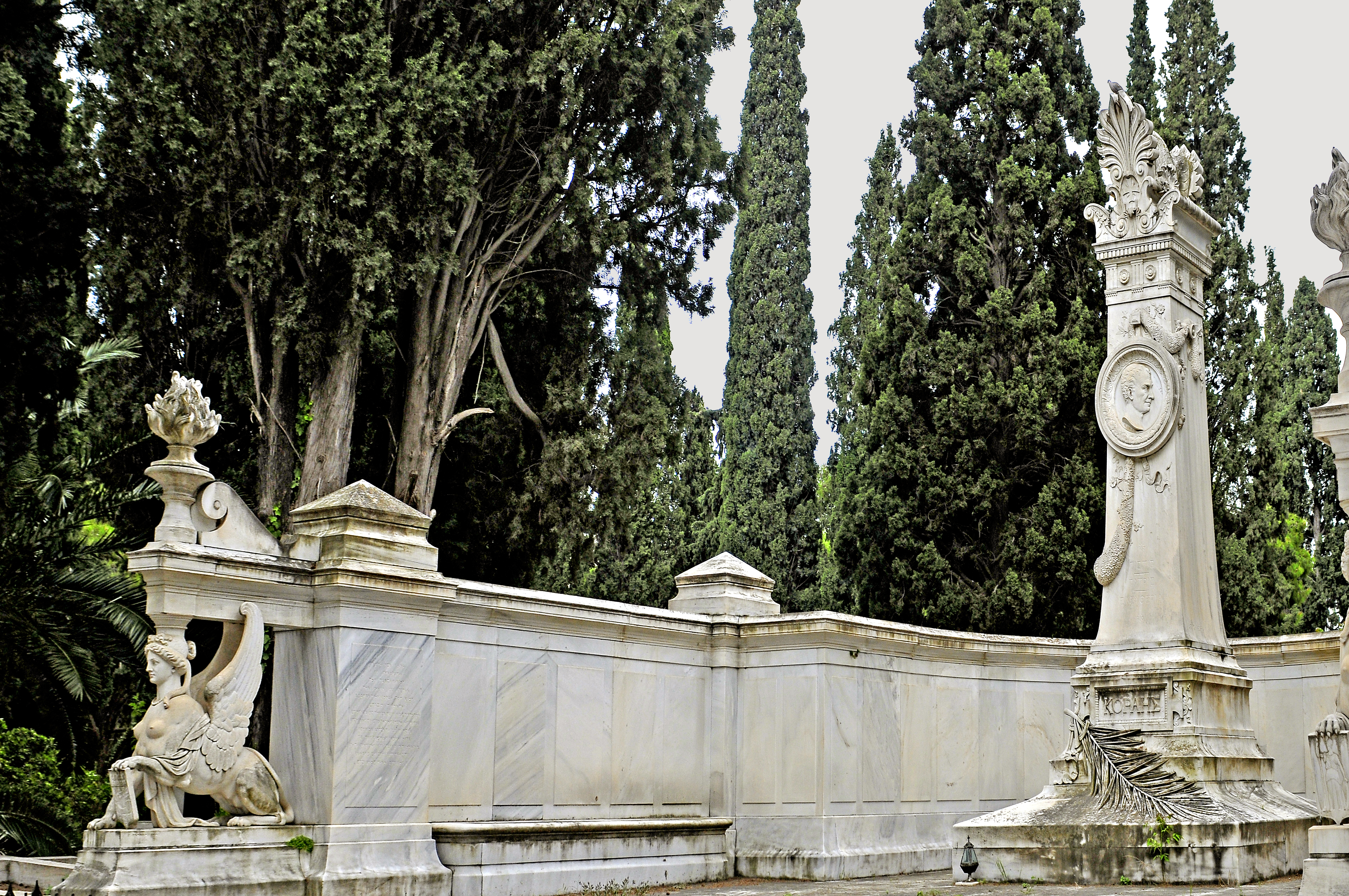
Grave of Adamantios Korais

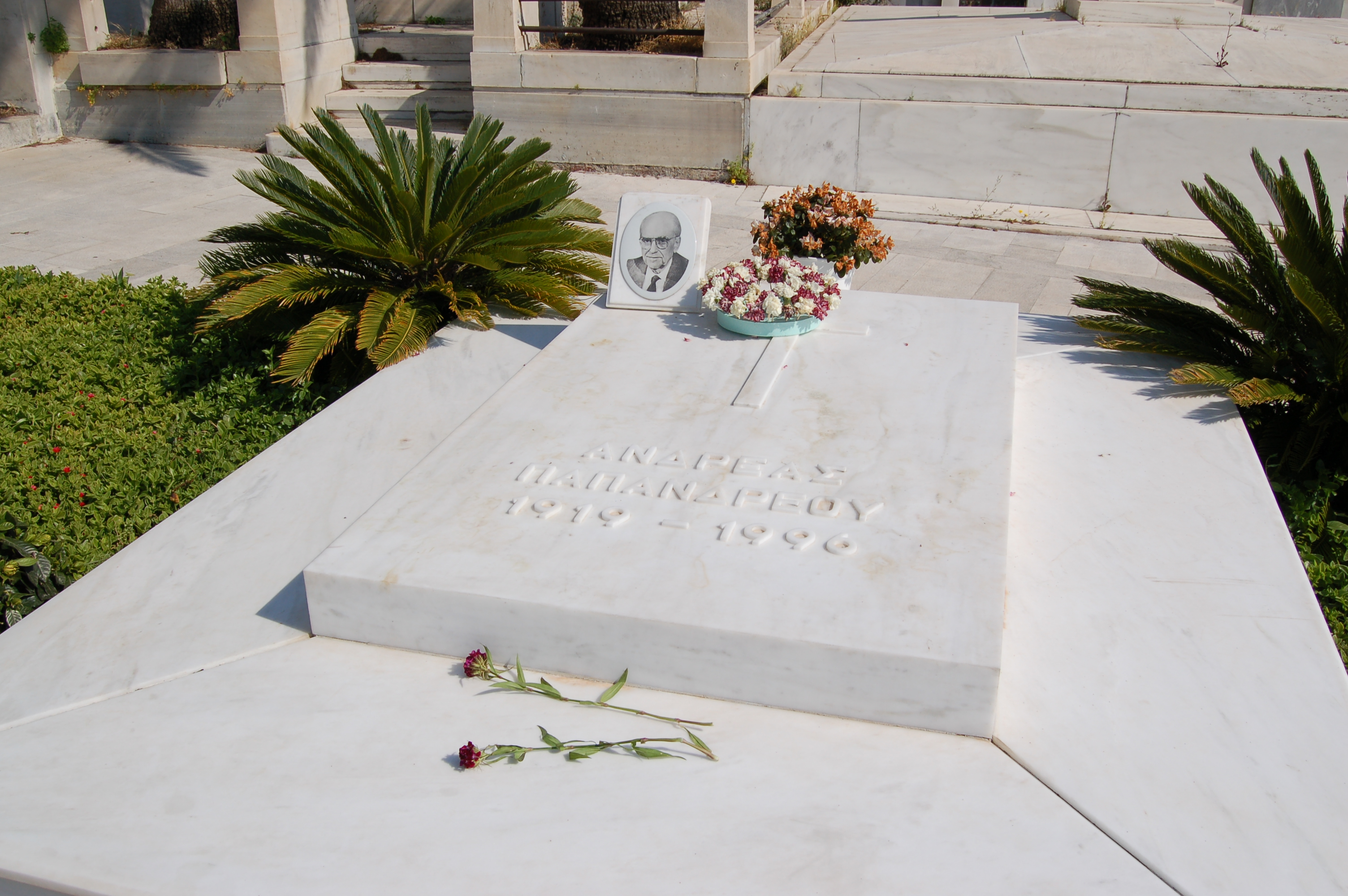
Grave of Andreas Papandreou

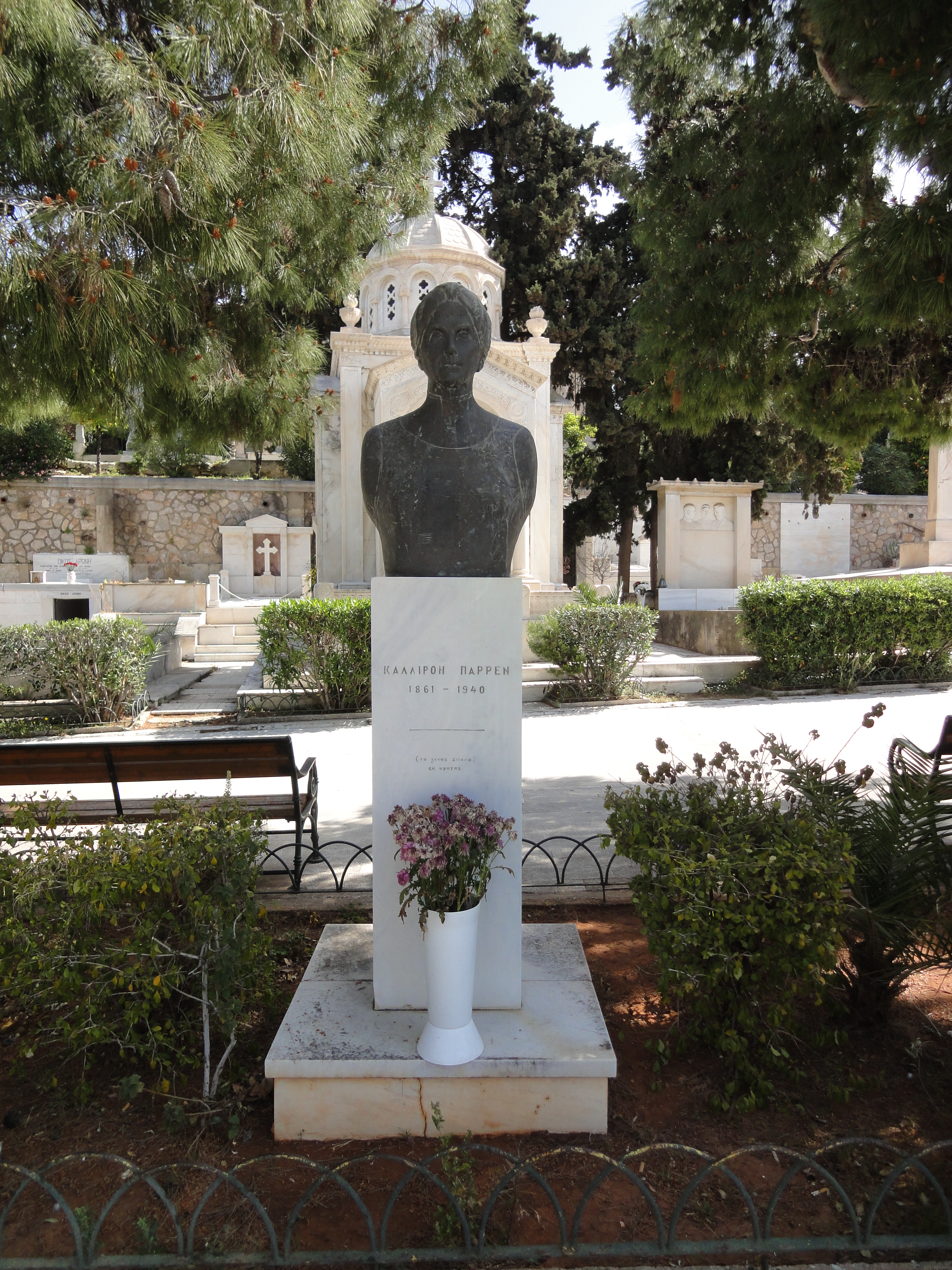
Grave of Kalliroi Parren

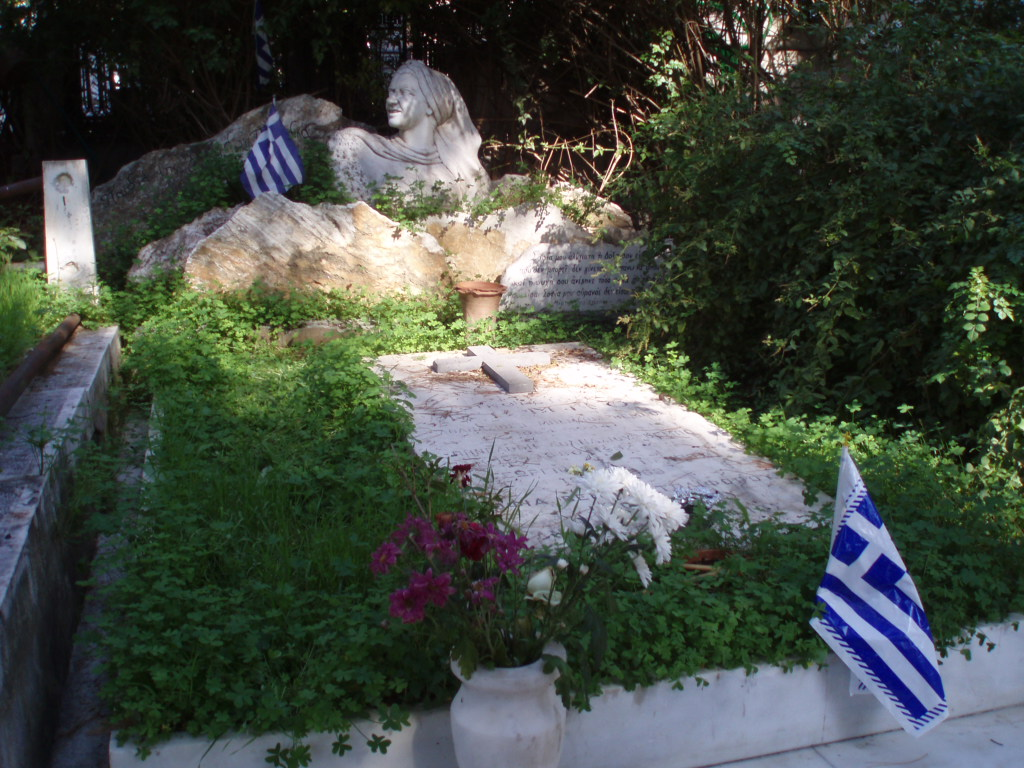
Grave of Sofia Vembo

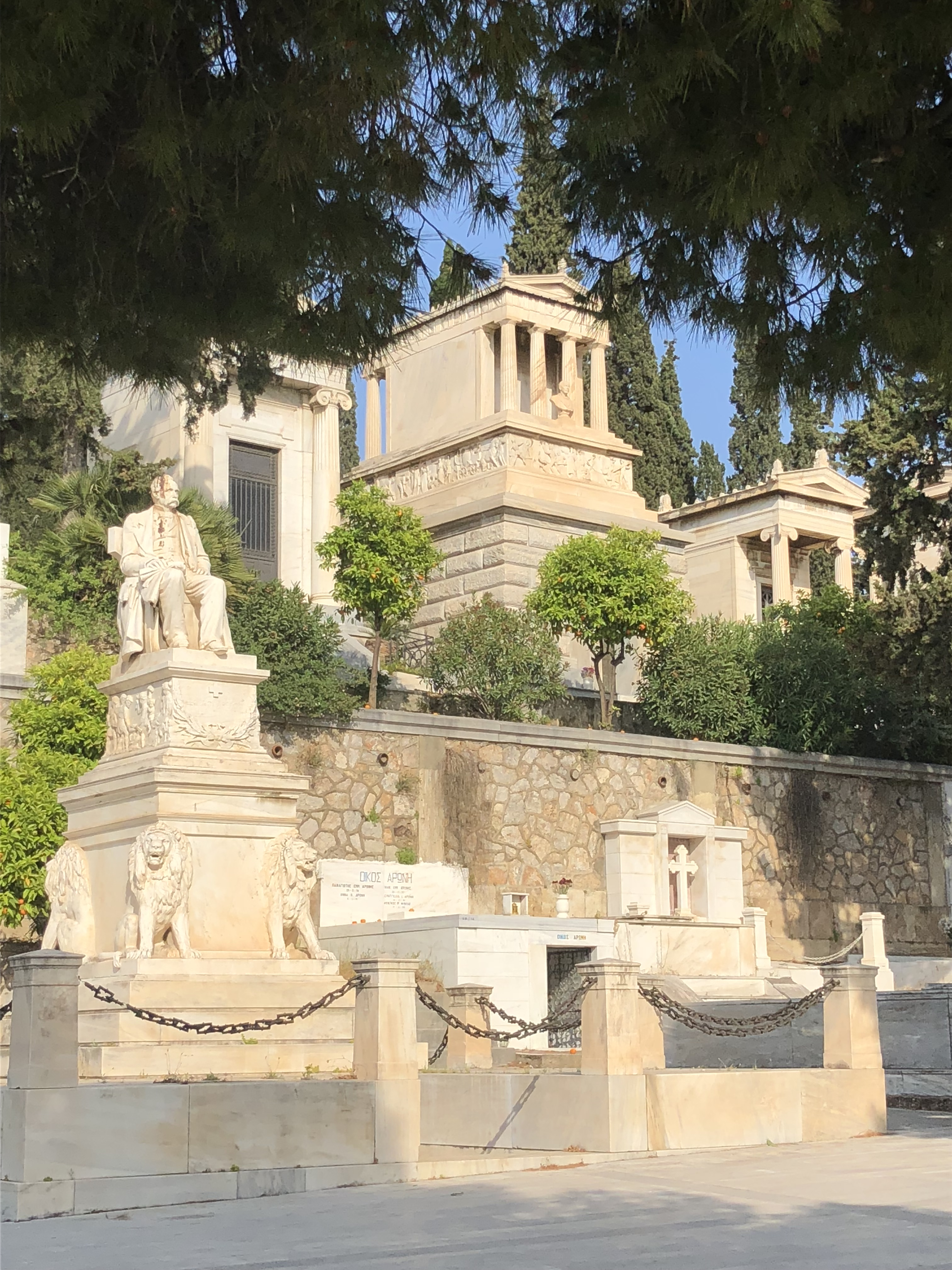
General view

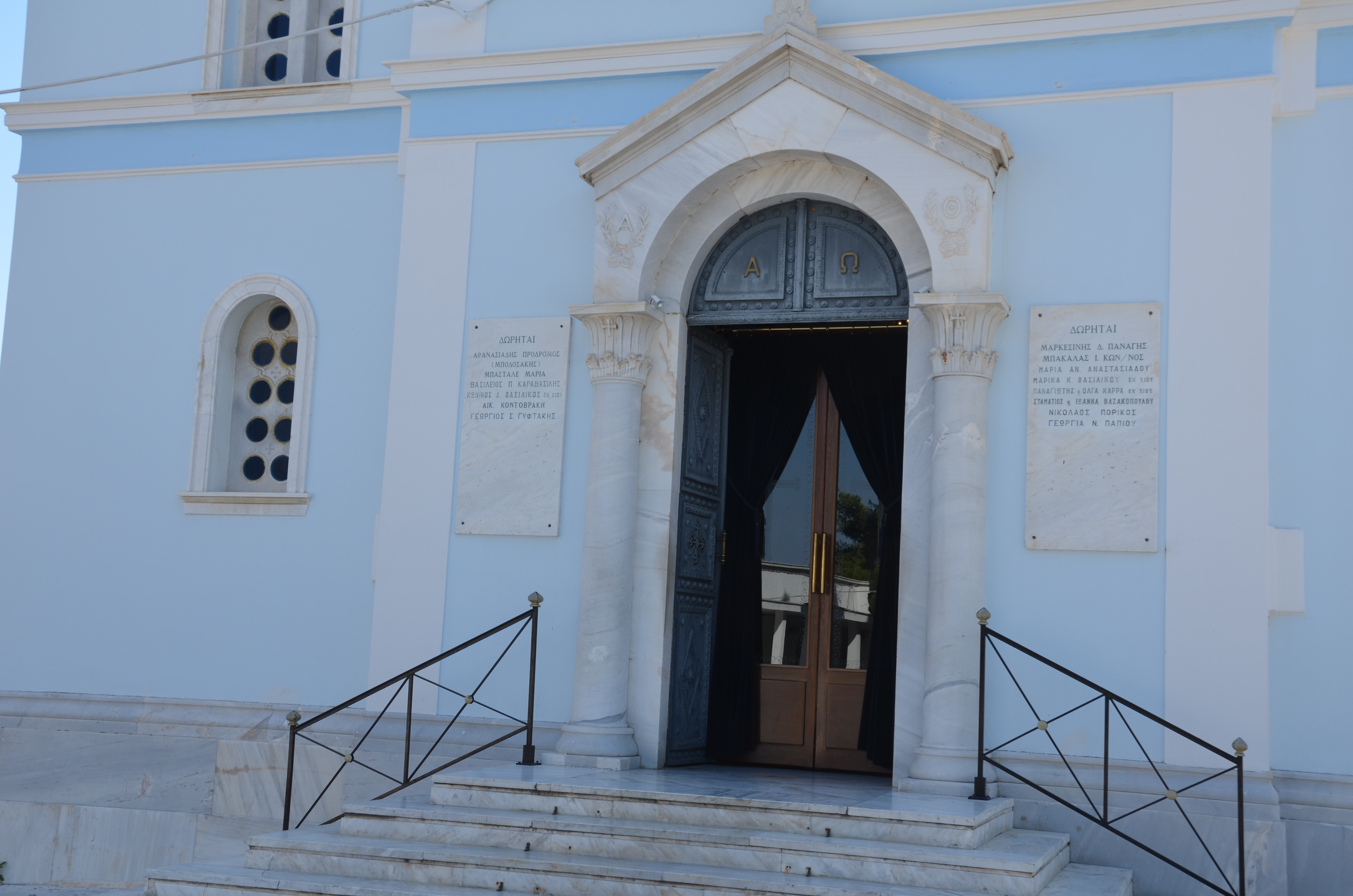
Entrance to the chapel
