= Sylva Akrita =

Greek politician (1928–2025)

- Σύλβα Ακρίτα

Deputy Minister of Health, Welfare and Social Insurance
- In office 31 October 1986 – 22 June 1988
- Prime Minister: Andreas Papandreou
- Preceded by: Maria Kypriotaki-Perraki
- Succeeded by: Manolis Skoulakis

Member of the Hellenic Parliament
- In office 18 October 1981 – 24 August 1996
- Constituency: Athens B (1981–1993); State Electoral District (1993–1996)

Member of the Hellenic Parliament
- In office 17 November 1974 – 22 October 1977
- Constituency: Municipality of Athens

Personal details
- Born: 17 July 1928 Thessaloniki, Greece
- Died: 23 December 2025 (aged 97)
- Party: PASOK (since 1974)
- Other political affiliations: Centre Union (until 1974)
- Spouse: Loukis Akritas (m. 1951; death 1965)
- Relations: Lily Papagianni (cousin)
- Children: Elena Akrita
- Parent: Konstantinos Giavasoglou (father)

Sylva-Kaiti Akrita (17 July 1928 – 23 December 2025) was a Greek politician, political activist and opponent of the Greek junta, the military dictatorship which ruled Greece from 1967 to 1974.

In 1967, Akrita became one of the first women to be arrested and sentenced to prison for her opposition to the military junta. Following the 1974 collapse of the Greek military dictatorship, Akrita was a founding member of the PASOK political party. During the 1974 Greek parliamentary election, Sylva Akrita became the first woman elected to the Hellenic Parliament from the PASOK party in history. She served as a member of parliament from 1974 until 1977 and again from 1981 until 1996, including a tenure as Deputy Minister of Health, Welfare and Social Insurance under Prime Minister Andreas Papandreou from 31 October 1986 to 22 June 1988.

Syla Akrita was the mother of Elena Akrita, a journalist who was first elected to the Hellenic Parliament from the Syriza party in 2023.

== Life and career ==
Akrita was born in Thessaloniki on 17 July 1928, to ethnic Greek parents from present-day Turkey. Her mother was Loukia Roussidi. Her father, Konstantinos Giavasoglou (1886–1977), was an industrialist and Greek Senator who served as Deputy Minister of Welfare, overseeing refugees, under Prime Minister Alexandros Papagos from 1954 to 1955. Akrita studied social welfare and related disciplines as a student.

She met her future husband, Loukis Akritas (1908–1965), a Greek Cypriot journalist, writer, and politician, while he was serving as a member of parliament and secretary general for the National Progressive Center Union (EPEK) party. The couple married in 1951. Their daughter is Elena Akrita, a journalist and politician who was elected as an MP for the Syriza party in the May and June 2023 Greek parliamentary elections.

=== Political career ===
Sylva Akrita entered active politics after the death of her husband. Akrita was the only female candidate from Georgios Papandreou's Centre Union party in the 1967 Greek legislative election. However, the election, originally scheduled for May 1967, was cancelled following the 1967 Greek coup d'état, which brought the Greek junta military dictatorship to power.

Akrita became a vocal opponent of the new Greek military dictatorship. She joined the Patriotic Front, a civil and political organization opposed to military rule. Akrita was arrested in 1967 and sentenced to ten years in prison by a military court, becoming one of the first Greek women to be imprisoned by the junta for political activities.

Sylva Akrita became a founding member of the PASOK in 1974. Following the end of military rule, Akirta was elected to the national Hellenic Parliament as one of three PASOK MPs representing the former municipality of Athens constituency in the 1974 Greek parliamentary election. In doing so, Sylva Akrita became the first woman ever elected to the national parliament from the PASOK party in history. She served her first term as an MP from 1974 to 1977.

Akrita returned to the Hellenic Parliament in the 1981 Greek parliamentary election, receiving the most votes of any female candidate. She was appointed to the foreign affairs committee and a representative of the Parliamentary Assembly of the Council of Europe. In 1984, she was elected to the Central Committee of the PASOK party.

Prime Minister Andreas Papandreou appointed Akrita as Deputy Minister of Health, Welfare and Social Insurance on 31 October 1986. Akrita had been previously considered for other ministerial posts by the Papandreou government, but her potential appointments were reportedly opposed by the prime minister's wife, Margaret Chant-Papandreou, who disagreed with Akrita over the existence of the Women's Union of Greece. Akrita served as Deputy Minister of Health from 31 October 1986 to 22 June 1988. During her tenure, Akrita spearheaded a bill to modernize the welfare system, drafted a new bill to regulate adoption procedures, founded new nurseries, and introduced a bill to eliminate the debts for Greek refugees.

In 1989, Akrita won re-election as the only woman MP representing the Athens B constituency. In 1993, she was again re-elected to parliament, as well as a member of the Council of Europe. She declined to seek re-election during the 1996 Greek parliamentary election after Costas Simitis became leader of PASOK and retired from active politics.

=== Death ===
Akrita died on 23 December 2025, at the age of 97. Her funeral was held at the First Cemetery of Athens on 29 December 2025.
