= Goudi =

Goudi Γουδή
- Neighborhood
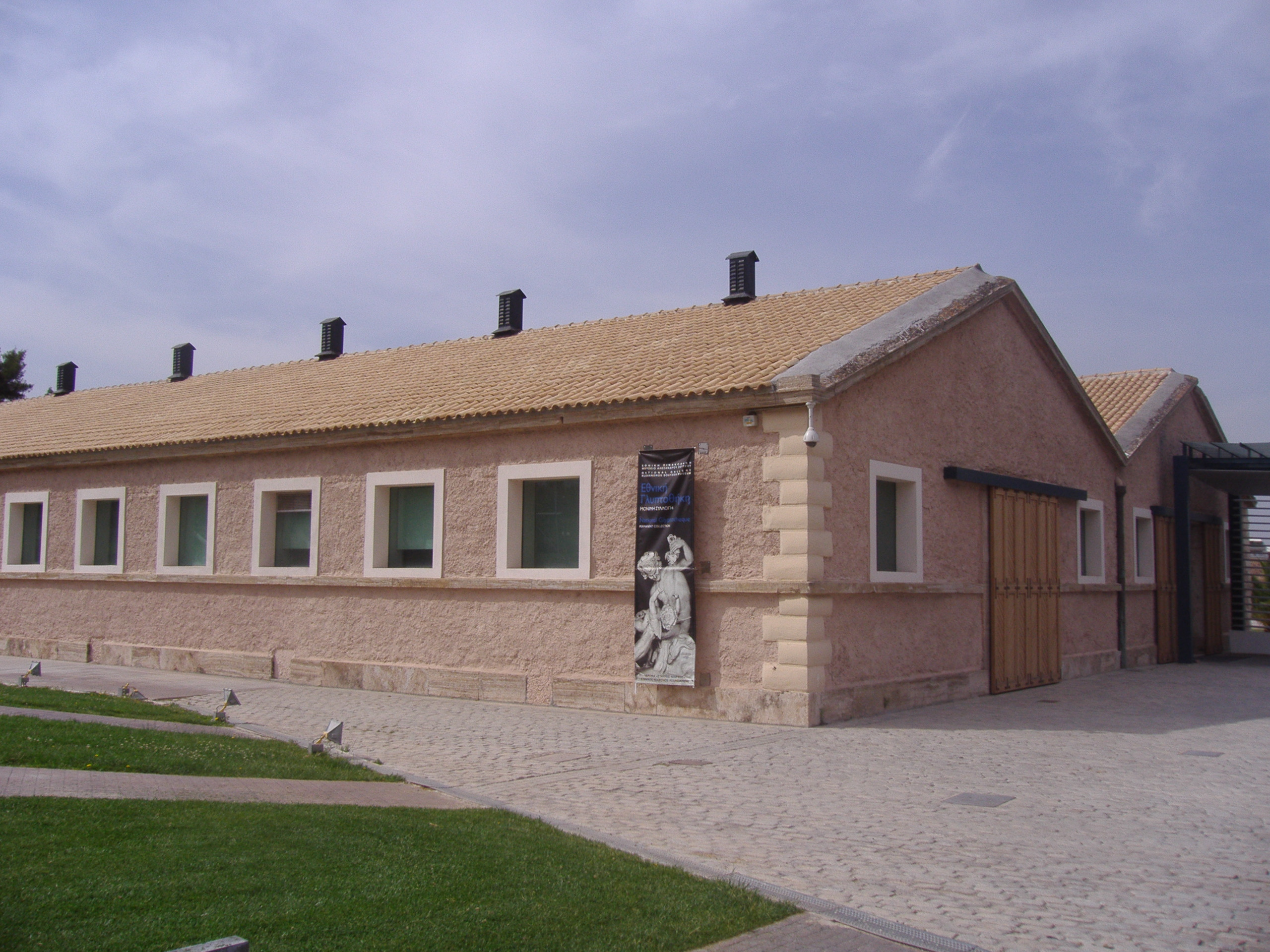
- National Glyptotheque

- Location within Athens
- Coordinates: 37°59′18″N 23°46′33″E
- Country: Greece
- Region: Attica
- City: Athens
- Postal code: 15773
- Area code: 210
- Website: www.zografou.gov.gr

Goudi (Greek: Γουδή, pronounced [ɣuˈði] since 2006; formerly Γουδί [ɣuˈði]) is a suburb on the eastern part of Athens, Greece and on the foothills of Mount Hymettus.

== History ==
The area's name derives from the 19th-century Goudis (Γουδής) family, who owned an estate there. Currently, there are three university hospitals (Laiko and two children's hospitals) and the main campuses for the Faculty of Medicine and the Faculty of Dentistry of the Athens University School of Health Sciences. The area's main square is St. Thomas' Square, with the church of St. Thomas in its middle.

An army barracks of the same name existed in Goudi, and the following events occurred there. The military movement of 1909 started by military officers in the barracks and later became known as the Goudi coup. A few years later, this is also where the Trial of the Six defendants were executed in 1922). The Goudi army barracks was decommissioned and turned into parkland and sports facilities, hosting the badminton and modern pentathlon venues for the 2004 Olympic Games.

During 2012, 'Goudi' became a catchcry during some political extremist rallies in Greece, with protesters chanting it to express their hostility to mainstream politicians who they perceived as traitors to the country during the Euro area crisis, alleging that they deserved a similar fate as the Trial of the Six defendants.

== Name dispute ==
The use of the name Γουδί, treated as if it were a neuter noun (rather than as a genitive of the surname Γουδή from which it derives) was widespread until translator Vasiliki Karagianni led a campaign to change to the correct use. Even during the years when the Goudi family were alive, popular opinion still led to its treating as a neuter noun, similar to other towns and cities whose name derived from surname such as Kapandriti, Tatoi and Galatsi.

Karagianni's campaign was ultimately successful and the city council of Athens approved the form change without objection in 2006. This led to a change in certain road signs and bus line names.
