= Yannoulis Chalepas =

Greek sculptor

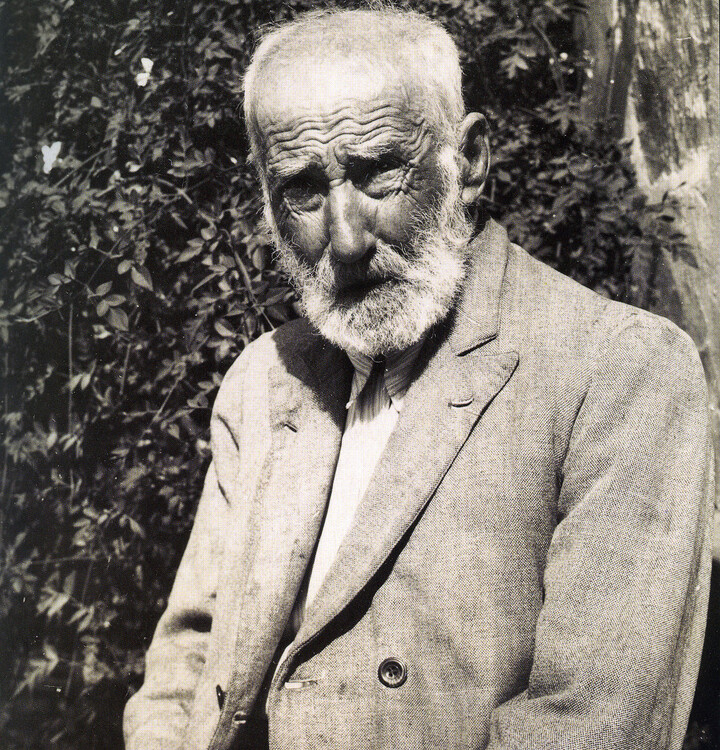
- Born: August 14, 1851; Pyrgos, Tinos, Greece
- Died: September 15, 1938 (aged 87); Athens, Greece
- Education: Athens School of Fine Arts; Munich Academy of Fine Arts
- Known for: Sculpture
- Notable work: Affection (1875), Satyr Playing with Eros (1875-1877), Sleeping Female Figure (1877), Medea and her Children (1922–3), Female Figure Relaxing (1931)
- Movement: Neoclassicism, Munich School
- Awards: “Award for Excellence in Arts and Letters” of the Academy of Athens (1927)

Yannoulis Chalepas (Greek: Γιαννούλης Χαλεπάς, born August 14, 1851 – September 15, 1938) was a Greek sculptor and a significant figure of Modern Greek art.

== Life ==
Chalepas was born in Pyrgos, on the island of Tinos in 1851, from a family of marble hewers. From 1869 to 1872, he studied at the School of Arts in Athens, under Neoclassical sculptor Leonidas Drossis. In 1873, he left for Munich, under a scholarship of the Panhellenic Holy Foundation of the Evangelistria of Tinos, to continue his studies at the Munich Academy of Fine Arts under the Neoclassical sculptor Max von Widnmann. His scholarship was intercepted to be given to another student. He returned to Athens in 1876, opened a workshop, and began working individually.

=== Mental illness ===
In 1878, Chalepas suffered a nervous breakdown. He began destroying some of his sculptures and made several suicide attempts. His condition worsened and from July 11, 1888 to June 6, 1902, he was committed to the Mental Hospital of Corfu. In 1901, his father died and the next year his mother went to Corfu and took Chalepas to Tinos. After his return, Chalepas lived under his mother's strict supervision, who blamed sculpture for her son's illness and prevented him from sculpting, destroying everything he created.

=== Rehabilitation ===
His mother died in 1916 and Chalepas began to work again with insufficient means, after a long time of inactivity. He gained attention and made contacts with intellectual circles in Athens. Also, many eminent personalities of the arts, such as Thomas Thomopoulos, a member of the Academy of Athens, and Zacharias Papantoniou, director of the National Gallery of Athens, visited him in Tinos. In 1925, an exhibition of Chalepas' works was organized by the Academy of Athens, and in 1927, he received the Academy's “Award for Excellence in Arts and Letters”. In 1930, he moved to Athens and continued working until his death on September 15, 1938.

== Art ==
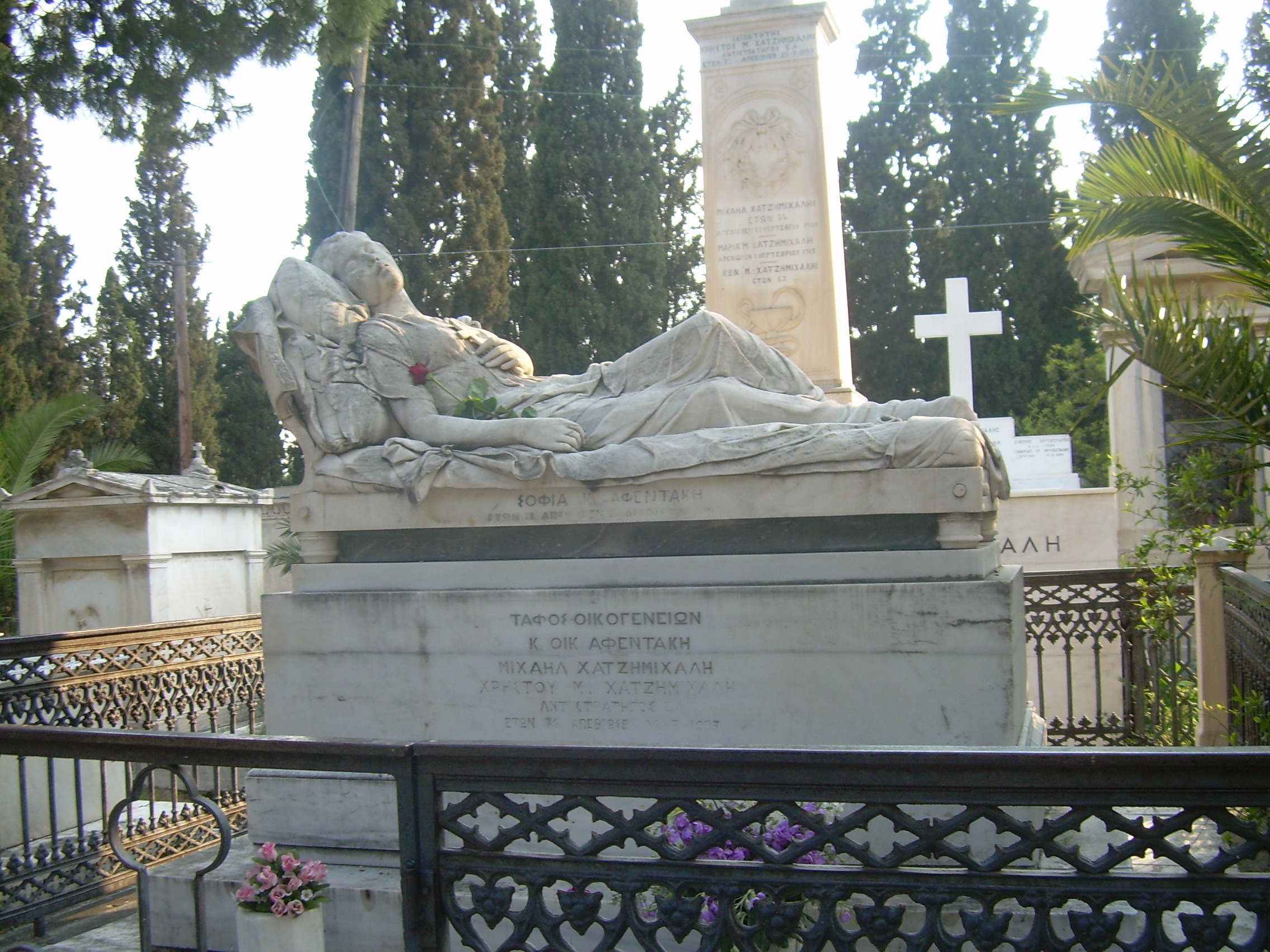
Sleeping Female Figure (1877), at the Tomb of Sofia Afentaki, First Cemetery of Athens

The art of Yannoulis Chalepas (1851–1938) is starkly divided into two distinct, yet equally influential, periods, setting him apart as the most significant sculptor of modern Greece. His initial period (1870–1878) was defined by mastery of Neoclassicism, learned during his studies in Athens and Munich. Works from this time, like the monumental marble tomb sculpture "Sleeping Female Figure" (Koimomeni) (1877) in the First Cemetery of Athens, showcase an extraordinary technical brilliance, conveying serene emotional depth through classical form. This early work represents the zenith of 19th-century Greek academic sculpture, but this promising career was tragically cut short when he suffered a mental breakdown in 1878, leading to decades of institutionalization and inactivity.

Chalepas's second creative phase, the so-called "post-sanity" period (1918–1938), began following his mother's death and a long period of creative silence, marking a radical and instinctive shift in style. Working with limited means back in Tinos and later in Athens, his later works broke free from academic constraints, adopting a spontaneous, often frantic style. Sculptures from this time, such as reworkings of "Medea" and complex pieces blending pagan and Christian themes, display a cryptic, decisive modeling that critics recognize as being unexpectedly in tune with European avant-garde movements like Expressionism and Cubism. This later output, characterized by inner anxiety and emotional rawness, firmly cemented Chalepas's place as a foundational figure whose personal tragedy transformed him from a brilliant academic sculptor into a pioneering voice of Greek Modernism.

== Gallery ==
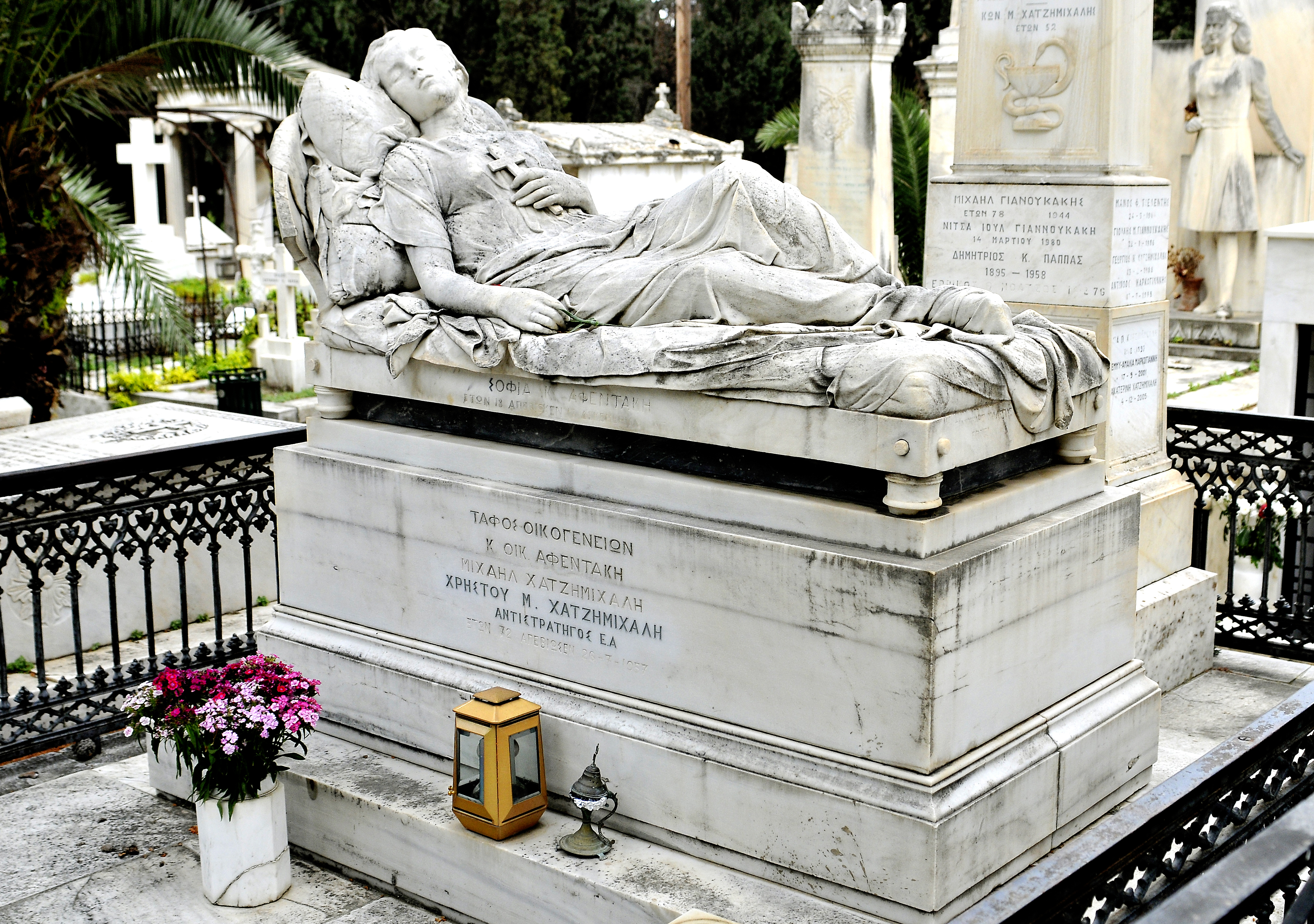
Tomb of Sofia Afentaki

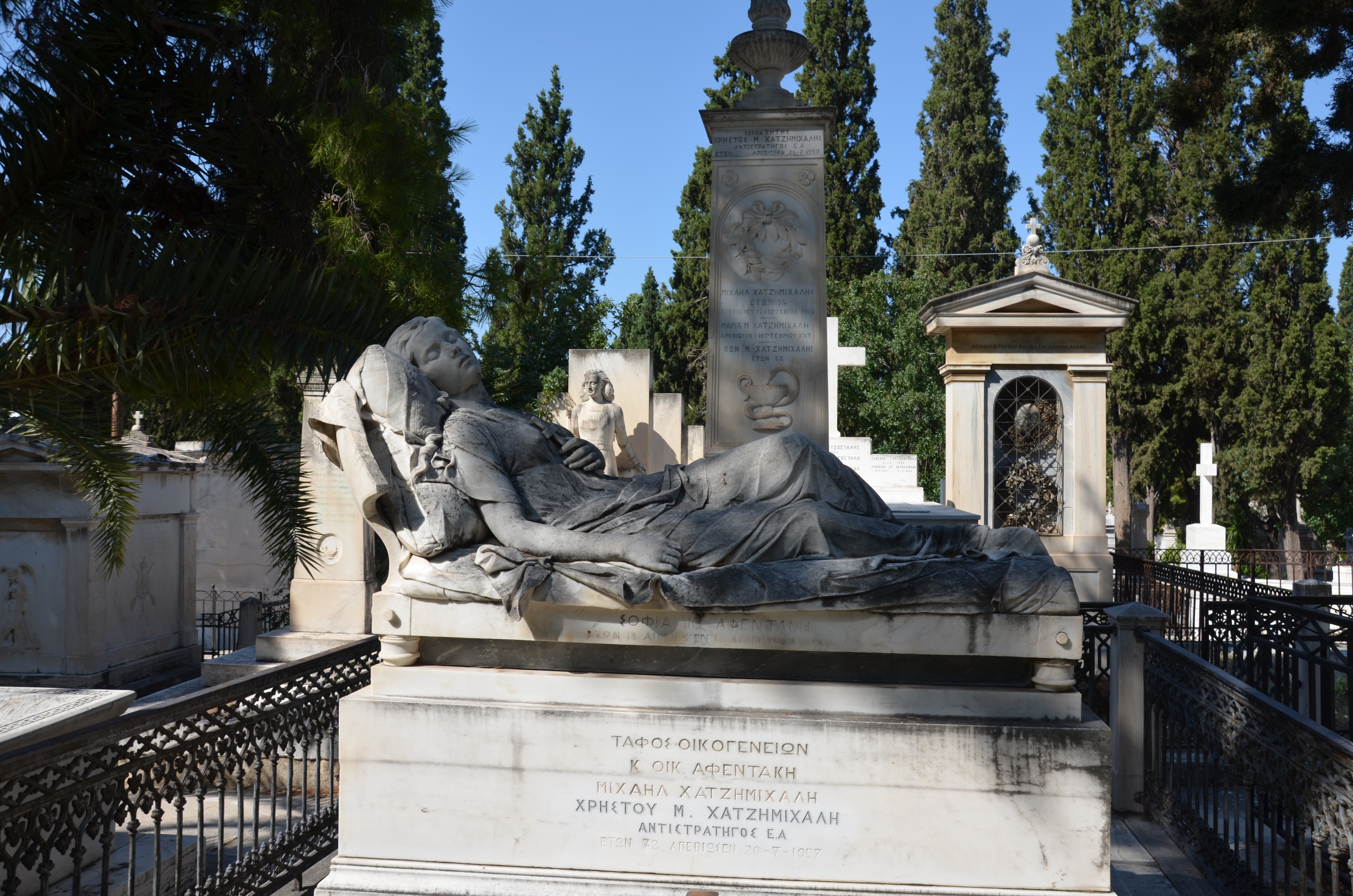
Tomb of Sofia Afentaki

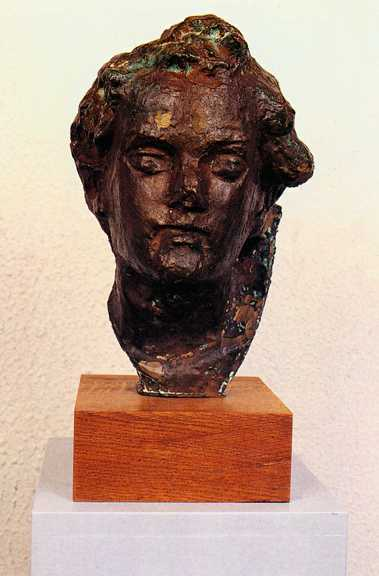
Head

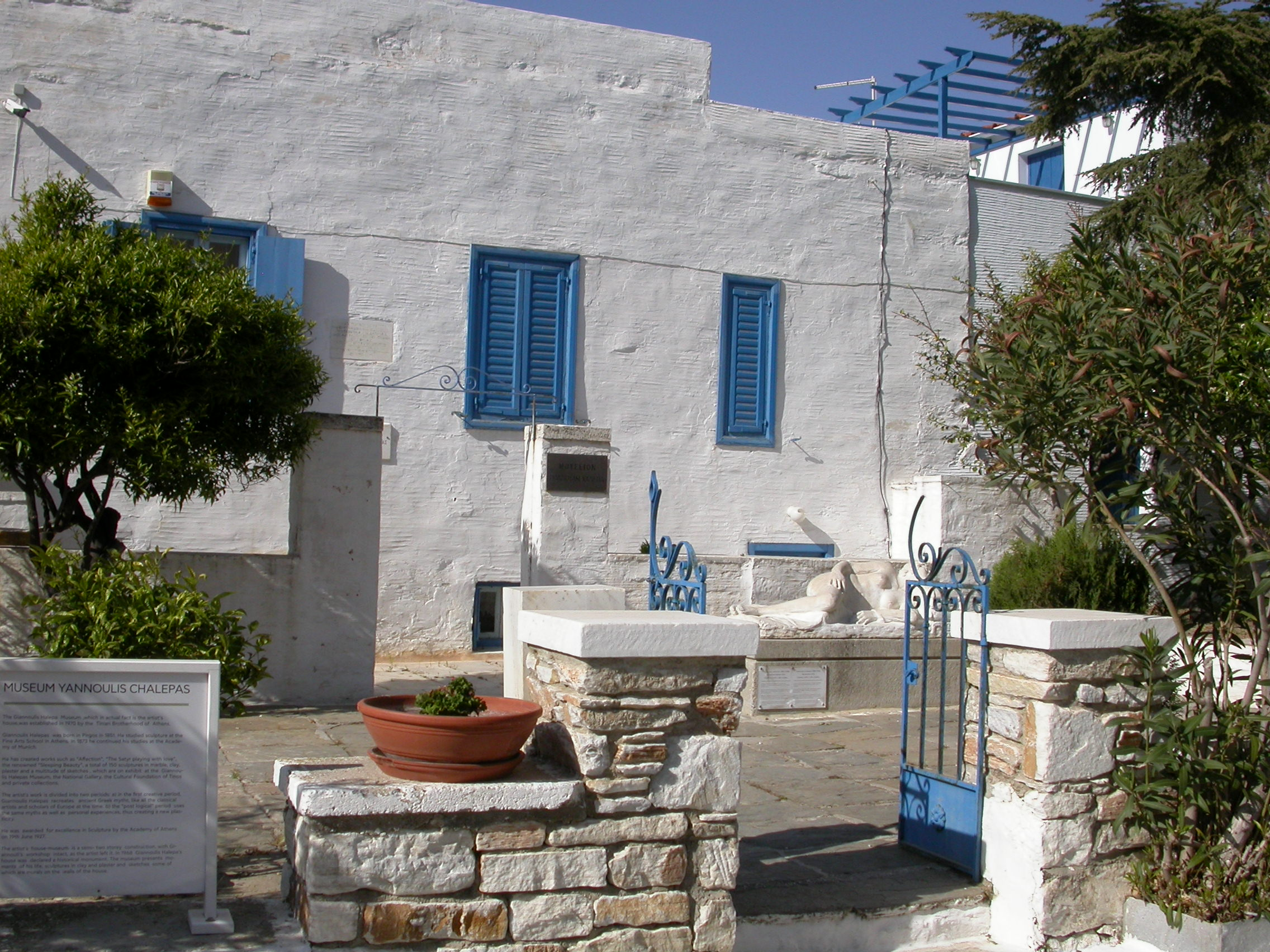
Yannoulis House Museum

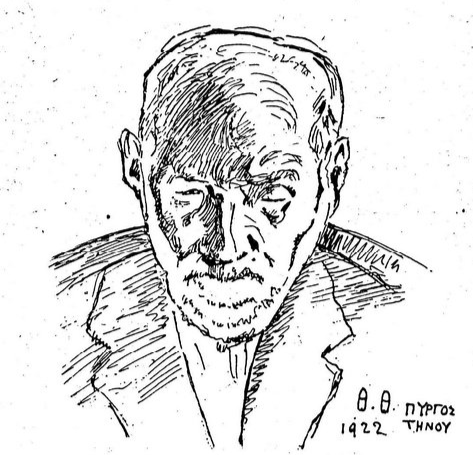
Sketch of sculptor

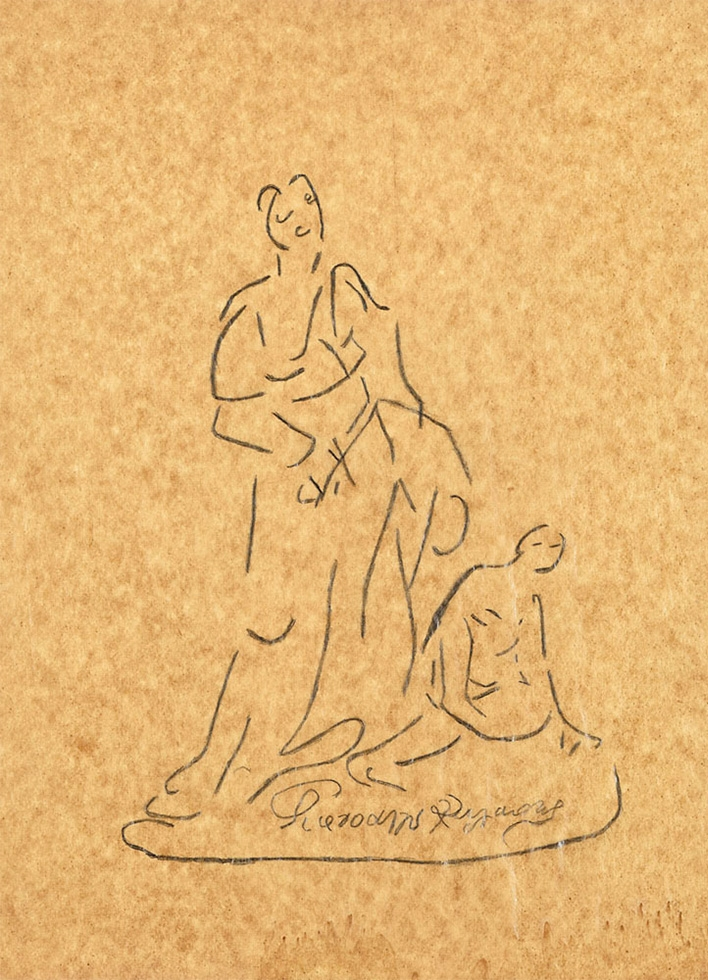
Sketch of sculptor
