= House of Fame (TV programme) =

- Genre: Talent show Reality
- Based on: La Academia by TV Azteca
- Directed by: Giorgos Logothetis
- Presented by: Eleni Foureira
- Judges: Giorgos Arsenakos; Katy Garbi; Phoebus; Yannis Ploutarchos
- Opening theme: Panik Records
- Country of origin: Greece
- Original language: Greek
- No. of seasons: 1
- No. of episodes: 85

Production
- Executive producer: Stefanos Kalligiannis
- Production locations: Koropi, Attica
- Running time: 120-240 minutes
- Production company: TV Azteca

Original release
- Network: Skai TV
- Release: February 15 – May 28, 2021

House of Fame, also known as House of Fame – La Academia, is a Greek talent and reality show based on the Mexican concept La Academia. It began airing on February 15, 2021 on Skai TV. Singer Eleni Foureira hosted the live concerts on Fridays. The four judges were the founder of the record company Panik Records Giorgos Arsenakos, singer Katy Garbi, songwriter Phoebus and singer Yannis Ploutarchos.

== Production ==
In 2020, Skai TV announced a new talent show and reality show, a same format like the show Fame Story, that used to air from 2002 until 2006 on ANT1. The show was confirmed for its first season to begin in 2020–2021 television season, with a trailer along with the renewals of The Voice of Greece, Big Brother and Survivor.

=== Scheduling ===
After speculation in November 2020, the show was expected to start in early 2021. The show's air date was officially confirmed on February 3, 2021 with a trailer. Every Friday opposite of the live concerts of House of Fame, will broadcast the seventh season of MasterChef Greece on Star Channel and I Farma returning after 16 years in the Greek Television ANT1. House of Fame will broadcast also in Cyprus on Sigma TV.

=== Broadcasting ===
The show began airing with the daily episodes, on February 15, 2021 and the first live concert will begin on February 26, 2021.

The daily episodes, where are seen what the contestants are doing in the academy, will broadcast from Monday to Friday at 06:00pm until 07:40pm. The first daily episode, on February 15, 2021, was broadcast at 05:15pm until 07:50pm.

The live concerts, where the contestants are singing the song that have learned the week and also one of them will leave the show, will broadcast live every Friday at 09:00pm until at 01:00am.

=== Filming ===
The Academy was located in Koropi, Attica. The house is the same house was used in the sixth season of Big Brother, but differently shaped. It's a state-of-the-art space of 700 m^{2} with a 12-meter pool. In the house, there are 56 cameras and 50 microphones installed. The students entered the academy on February 13, 2021 and the next day began the lessons.

== Format ==
The most fun music Academy welcomes eighteen talented singers from Greece and Cyprus. For the next few months, the students become roommates in the same house where all the spaces are shared. Students will follow a strict curriculum from early morning until the afternoon while as in any Academy, unjustified absences are prohibited. Vocals, dance, exercise and costume design are just a few of the courses that will be taught on a daily basis. Additional seminars, meetings and surprise collaborations with renowned singers are in the program of the Academy. Cameras and microphones record their daily life 24 hours a day, 7 days a week with the most important moments being shown daily in the afternoon.

In the lives of the show, Eleni Foureira welcomes the students of the Academy on the stage of House of Fame – La Academia for the most critical concert of their lives. Students present the song they prepared the week before. The judges and the TV audience will decide on the future of the students at the top music academy. At the end of the live concert the judges will select the three contestants to be nominated for eviction for the next live, while viewers will have a week to vote for the singer they want to stay on the House of Fame.

== Cast ==
=== Host ===
- Eleni Foureira

=== Judges ===
- Giorgos Arsenakos
- Katy Garbi
- Phoebus
- Yannis Ploutarchos

=== Teachers ===
- Panos Metaxopoulos – Director of the Academy
- Penny Baltatzi – Responsible for vocals
- Chali Jennings – Choreographer
- Al Giga – Style Expert
- Dora Panteli – Health & Wellness Coach

=== Guest star ===
- Stan (episode 2)
- Katerina Stanisi (episode 15)
- Bo (episode 22)
- Angela Dimitriou (episode 27)
- Panos Kalidis (episode 37)
- Evi Droutsa (episodes 43 & 46)
- Ilias Vrettos (episode 49)
- Demy (episode 56)
- Josephine (episode 57 & 73)
- Dionysis Schoinas (episode 58)
- Harry Varthakouris (episode 61)
- Athena Manoukian (episode 62)
- Ioanna Maleskou (episode 63)
- Eleni Peta (episode 64)
- Akis Diximos (episode 64, 66–67, 72, 78–79 & 82)
- Elena Tsagrinou (episode 66)
- Kalomira (episode 70)
- Constantina (episode 77)
- Lefteris Kintatos (episode 77)
- Giorgos Lempesis (episode 78)
- Dimos Anastasiadis (episode 79)

== Students ==
On February 13, 2021, Skai TV announced the 17 students, who entered on the first week. On the fourth week, two new students, Elena Domazou and Minas Tsoukanis entered the academy.

Student	Age on entry	Hometown	Concert of elimination	Place finished
Stefanos Pitsiniagas	22	Gytheio	Live Final	Winner
Jimmy Sion	26	Athens	Live Final	Runner-up
Aris Vantarakis	30	Patras	Live Final	Runner-up
Venia Karagiannidou	26	Thessaloniki	Live Final	Runner-up
George Spetsiotis	24	Mytilene	Live Final	5th
Giannis Arvanitidis	28	Xanthi	Live Final	6th
Marianna Kara	22	Athens	Live Concert 12	7th
Koni Bizinti	18	Athens	Live Concert 12	8th
Penelope Tsiakiridou	30	Thessaloniki	Live Concert 11	9th
Giorgos Dinos	30	Athens	Live Concert 11	10th
Elena Domazou	28	Piraeus	Live Concert 10	11th
Chryssa Malakozi	29	Kavala	Live Concert 9	12th
Minas Tsoukanis	23	Thessaloniki	Live Concert 8	13th
Alexandra Kolaiti	19	Nea Smyrni	Live Concert 7	14th
Obi	27	Athens	Live Concert 6	15th
Themis (Holly Grace)	32	Larissa	Live Concert 5	16th
Elena Roinou	22	Sparta, Laconia	Live Concert 4	17th
Anastasia Bisyla	33	Athens	Live Concert 3	18th
Alex Manti	27	Athens	Live Concert 2	19th

== Live Concerts ==
The live concerts began airing on February 26, 2021. In every live concert, the contestants are assigned a popular song to perform in a duet or solo. Before the live concerts, the Academy's Teachers chooses the student of the week. This student has immunity for the next live concert. In the live concerts, the jury panel comments and rate from 1 to 10 on the performances and nominates three students for elimination. Before the live concert, the students nominates one of the student and at the end the student with the most votes, will be deducted 4 points from the judges' rates. Throughout the week, the television audience decides which of the three prospective students must leave the Academy. Since the live concert 2, the total points from the bottom five/six from the judge's scores are shown. Since the fifth concert, the Director of the Academy, Panos Metaxopoulos, can save one of the three contestants that they are up for elimination. Then the contestant that was in the bottom four of the judge's scores, was up for elimination. Metaxopoulos can save only 3 times until the end of the show.

=== Results summary ===
Colour key

–	Contestant received immunity by the Academy's teacher and was the student of the week.
–	Contestants were in the bottom four/five/six of the judge's scores, but were not up for the elimination and were not the nominees of the week.
–	Contestants were in the bottom three of the judge's scores and were up for the elimination and were the nominees of the week.
–	Contestant was up for the elimination and was one of the nominees of the week, but was saved by the director of the academy.
–	Contestant was up for the elimination and was one of the nominees of the week, but was saved by the judges.

	Concert 1	Concert 2	Concert 3	Concert 4	Concert 5	Concert 6	Concert 7	Concert 8	Concert 9	Concert 10	Concert 11	Concert 12	Final
Stefanos	Nominated	Saved	Nominated	Nominated	Saved	Student of the week	Saved	Saved	Student of the week	Nominated	Nominated	Finalist	Winner (Final)
Aris	Saved	Saved	Student of the week	Saved	Saved	Saved	Saved	Saved	Saved	Saved	Nominated	Finalist	Runner-up (Final)
Jimmy	Saved	Saved	Saved	Student of the week	Saved	Saved	Saved	Nominated	Saved	Nominated	Nominated	Finalist	Runner-up (Final)
Venia	Student of the week	Saved	Saved	Saved	Saved	Saved	Saved	Saved	Saved	Saved	Saved	Finalist	Runner-up (Final)
George	Saved	Saved	Saved	Saved	Nominated	Saved	Student of the week	Saved	Saved	Saved	Nominated	Finalist	5th place (Final)
Giannis	Saved	Saved	Saved	Saved	Student of the week	Saved	Saved	Nominated	Saved	Saved	Nominated	Finalist	6th place (Final)
Marianna	Saved	Saved	Saved	Saved	Saved	Saved	Saved	Saved	Nominated	Saved	Nominated	Evicted (Live Concert 12)	
Koni	Saved	Saved	Saved	Saved	Saved	Nominated	Saved	Saved	Saved	Student of the week	Nominated	Evicted (Live Concert 12)	
Penelope	Saved	Nominated	Saved	Saved	Saved	Saved	Nominated	Saved	Nominated	Nominated	Evicted (Live Concert 11)		
Giorgos	Saved	Saved	Saved	Saved	Saved	Saved	Nominated	Saved	Saved	Nominated	Evicted (Live Concert 11)		
Elena D.	Not in Academy		Saved	Saved	Nominated	Saved	Saved	Student of the week	Nominated	Evicted (Live Concert 10)			
Chryssa	Saved	Saved	Saved	Saved	Saved	Saved	Saved	Nominated	Evicted (Live Concert 9)				
Minas	Not in Academy		Nominated	Saved	Saved	Nominated	Nominated	Evicted (Live Concert 8)					
Alexandra	Saved	Nominated	Saved	Nominated	Saved	Nominated	Evicted (Live Concert 7)						
Obi	Saved	Saved	Saved	Saved	Nominated	Evicted (Live Concert 6)							
Holly Grace	Saved	Student of the week	Saved	Nominated	Evicted (Live Concert 5)								
Elena R.	Nominated	Saved	Nominated	Evicted (Live Concert 4)									
Anastasia	Saved	Nominated	Evicted (Live Concert 3)										
Alex	Nominated	Evicted (Live Concert 2)											
Student of the week	Venia	Holly Grace	Aris	Jimmy	Giannis	Stefanos	George	Elena D.	Stefanos	Koni	None	Winner	Stefanos; Most votes (out of 4) to win
Nominated (pre-saved)	None				Elena D. George; Obi	Alexandra; Koni; Minas	Giorgos; Minas; Penelope	Giannis; Jimmy; Marianna	Elena D. Marianna; Penelope	Giorgos; Jimmy; Penelope; Stefanos	Aris; George; Giannis; Jimmy; Koni; Marianna; Stefanos; Venia	Winner	Stefanos; Most votes (out of 4) to win
Saved by director	None				None	None	None	Marianna	None	None	None	Finalist	Aris; Fewest votes (out of 4) to win
Saved by judges	None				None						Venia	Finalist	Aris; Fewest votes (out of 4) to win
Up for elimination	Alex; Elena R. Stefanos	Alexandra; Anastasia; Penelope	Elena R. Minas; Stefanos	Alexandra; Stefanos; Holly Grace	Elena D. George; Obi	Alexandra; Koni; Minas	Giorgos; Minas; Penelope	Chryssa; Giannis; Jimmy	Elena D. Marianna; Penelope	Giorgos; Jimmy; Penelope; Stefanos	Aris; George; Giannis; Jimmy; Koni; Marianna; Stefanos	Finalist	Jimmy; Fewest votes (out of 4) to win
Up for elimination	Alex; Elena R. Stefanos	Alexandra; Anastasia; Penelope	Elena R. Minas; Stefanos	Alexandra; Stefanos; Holly Grace	Elena D. George; Obi	Alexandra; Koni; Minas	Giorgos; Minas; Penelope	Chryssa; Giannis; Jimmy	Elena D. Marianna; Penelope	Giorgos; Jimmy; Penelope; Stefanos	Aris; George; Giannis; Jimmy; Koni; Marianna; Stefanos	Finalist	Venia; Fewest votes (out of 4) to win
Eliminated	Alex; Fewest votes to save	Anastasia; Fewest votes to save	Elena R. Fewest votes to save	Holly Grace; Fewest votes to save	Obi; Fewest votes to save	Alexandra; Fewest votes to save	Minas; Fewest votes to save	Chryssa; Fewest votes to save	Elena D. Fewest votes to save	Penelope; Fewest votes (out of 3) to save	Marianna; Fewest votes (out of 6) to save	Finalist	George; Fewest votes (out of 5) to win
Eliminated	Alex; Fewest votes to save	Anastasia; Fewest votes to save	Elena R. Fewest votes to save	Holly Grace; Fewest votes to save	Obi; Fewest votes to save	Alexandra; Fewest votes to save	Minas; Fewest votes to save	Chryssa; Fewest votes to save	Elena D. Fewest votes to save	Giorgos; Fewest votes (out of 4) to save	Koni; Fewest votes (out of 7) to save	Finalist	Giannis; Fewest votes (out of 6) to win

=== Live Concert details ===
==== Live Concert 1 (February 26) ====
- Group performance: Alex, Aris, George, Giannis, Koni, Marianna, Obi, Venia – "Survivor"/"Den Me Afora"/"Mazi sou"/"Eleges"/"Dokimase Me"

Contestants' performances on Live Concert 1
Contestant	Order	Song	Result
Aris	1	"Poso"	Saved
Koni	2	"Physical"	Saved
Chryssa	3	"Deytera Kleidia"	Saved
Alexandra	4	"Ain't No Other Man"	Saved
Giannis	5	"Akoma Se Zito"	Saved
Penelope	6	"Zombie"	Saved
Holly Grace	7	"Zitate Na Sas Po"	Saved
Venia	8	"Lioma Se Gremo"	Student of the week
Obi	9	"Believer"	Saved
Marianna	10	"Little Me"	Saved
Giorgos	11	"Asimenia Sfika"	Saved
George	12	"Einai Stigmes"	Saved
Alex	13	"La Isla Bonita"	Nominated
Elena R.	14	"Den Mas Sygxoro"	Nominated
Stefanos	15	"Mi Hanomaste"	Nominated
Anastasia	16	"You Got the Love"	Saved
Jimmy	17	"Changed the Way You Kiss Me"	Saved

==== Live Concert 2 (March 5) ====
Contestants' performances on Live Concert 2
Contestant	Order	Song	Result
Up for elimination
Elena R.	1	"Stereotipa"	Saved
Alex	2	"To Dikio Mou"	Eliminated
Stefanos	3	"Emena Na Akous"	Saved
Regular performances
Marianna	4	"Love the Way You Lie"	Saved
Obi	4	"Love the Way You Lie"	Saved
Holly Grace	5	"Just Dance"	Student of the week
Jimmy	6	"Supersonic"	Saved
George	7	"Sou milo kai kokkinizeis"	Saved
Penelope	8	"Girls Just Want to Have Fun"	Nominated
Anastasia	9	"Thalassaki mou"	Nominated
Aris	10	"Dyo Zoes"	Saved
Chryssa	11	"S'eho Kanei Theo"	Saved
Alexandra	12	"Matwnw"	Nominated
Venia	13	"O,ti agapo einai diko sou"	Saved
Koni	14	"Pao"	Saved
Giorgos	15	"Way Down We Go"	Saved
Giannis	16	"Methis' apopse koritsi mou"	Saved

===== Judge's scores =====
Judge's scores of the Bottom five
Contestant	Rank	Judge's scores	Result
Koni	12th	21	Bottom five
Stefanos	12th	21	Bottom five
Alexandra	14th	16	Nominated
Penelope	15th	21 (−4=17)	Nominated
Anastasia	16th	16 (−4=12)	Nominated

==== Live Concert 3 (March 12) ====
Contestants' performances on Live Concert 3
Contestant	Order	Song	Result
Up for elimination
Alexandra	1	"I Got You (I Feel Good)"	Saved
Penelope	2	"Patoma"	Saved
Anastasia	3	"Siboney"	Eliminated
Regular performances
Giannis	4	"Min Xanartheis"	Saved
Venia	5	"Deja Vu"	Saved
Stefanos	6	"Misi Kardia"	Nominated
Jimmy	7	"Kalos sas vrika"	Saved
Chryssa	8	"Pou kai Pou"	Saved
Elena R.	9	"Akrogialies Dilina"	Nominated
Obi	10	"Savage Love"	Saved
George	11	"Thelo na se Xanado"	Saved
Koni	12	"Havana"	Saved
Giorgos	13	"Everybody's Got to Learn Sometime"	Saved
Holly Grace	14	"Aytos pou Perimeno"	Saved
Aris	15	"Ego ki Esy"	Student of the week
Elena D.	15	"Ego ki Esy"	Saved
Minas	16	"Giati"	Nominated
Marianna	17	"You Keep Me Hangin' On"	Saved

===== Judge's scores =====
Judge's scores of the Bottom six
Contestant	Rank	Judge's scores	Result
Chryssa	12th	24	Bottom six
Marianna	12th	24	Bottom six
Holly Grace	14th	23	Bottom four
Minas	15th	22	Nominated
Stefanos	16th	19	Nominated
Elena R.	17th	21 (−4=17)	Nominated

==== Live Concert 4 (March 19) ====
Contestants' performances on Live Concert 4
Contestant	Order	Song	Result
Up for elimination
Elena R.	1	"Efyges Noris"	Eliminated
Minas	2	"Eleges"	Saved
Stefanos	3	"Ta Sxinia sou"	Saved
Regular performances
Koni	4	"Worth It"	Saved
Elena D.	5	"Tou Agoriou apenanti"	Saved
Giannis	6	"S' agapao sou fonaxa"	Saved
Holly Grace	7	"Mi Me Sigkrineis"	Nominated
Venia	8	"Poia Thisia"	Saved
Marianna	9	"Rude Boy"	Saved
Aris	10	"Spasmeno Karavi"	Saved
Chryssa	11	"Andistrofi Metrisi"	Saved
Penelope	11	"Andistrofi Metrisi"	Saved
George	12	"Girismata"	Saved
Alexandra	13	"Jolene"	Nominated
Giorgos	14	"T' anipota"	Saved
Jimmy	15	"Paradise City"	Student of the week
Obi	16	"Ola Kala"	Saved

===== Judge's scores =====
Judge's scores of the Bottom six
Contestant	Rank	Judge's scores	Result
Koni	11th	21	Bottom six
George	12th	24 (−4=20)	Bottom five
Minas	13th	23 (−4=19)	Bottom four
Alexandra	14th	18	Nominated
Stefanos	14th	18	Nominated
Holly Grace	16th	17	Nominated

==== Live Concert 5 (March 26) ====
Contestants' performances on Live Concert 5
Contestant	Order	Song	Result
Up for elimination
Alexandra	1	"Let's Get Loud"	Saved
Stefanos	2	"Aggele mou"	Saved
Holly Grace	3	"Gernao Mama"	Eliminated
Regular performances
Giannis	4	"Tetia Nyhta"	Student of the week
Obi	5	"Blinding Lights"	Nominated
Chryssa	6	"To Lathos"	Saved
George	7	"Fotia Mou"	Nominated
Koni	7	"Fotia Mou"	Saved
Venia	8	"Krata Me"	Saved
Jimmy	9	"Butterfly"	Saved
Marianna	10	"Sorry"	Saved
Penelope	11	"Fila Me"	Saved
Elena D.	12	"Ximeromata"	Nominated
Minas	13	"Pano Apo Ola"	Saved
Giorgos	14	"Me Sena Plai Mou"	Saved
Aris	15	"I Nyhta Mirizei Giasemi"	Saved

===== Judge's scores =====
Judge's scores of the Bottom six
Contestant	Rank	Judge's scores	Result
Alexandra	10th	22	Bottom six
Marianna	11th	21	Bottom five
Minas	11th	21	Bottom five
George	13th	24 (−4=20)	Nominated
Obi	13th	20	Nominated
Elena D.	15th	18	Nominated

==== Live Concert 6 (April 2) ====
Contestants' performances on Live Concert 6
Contestant	Order	Song	Result
Up for elimination
Elena D.	1	"Edeka Para"	Saved
Obi	2	"Eho mia Agapi"	Eliminated
George	3	"Mikres Nothies"	Saved
Regular performances
Marianna	4	"Summer in Greece"	Saved
Stefanos	4	"Summer in Greece"	Student of the week
Jimmy	5	"Locked Out of Heaven"	Saved
Chryssa	6	"Na Tin Hairesai"	Saved
Aris	7	"Ah Koritsi mou"	Saved
Minas	8	"I Pipa tis Eirinis"	Nominated
Alexandra	9	"Vogue"	Nominated
Koni	9	"Vogue"	Nominated
Giorgos	10	"Sa na mi Perase mia Mera"	Saved
Giannis	11	"Treli Idea"	Saved
Venia	12	"Feygo"	Saved
Penelope	13	"Oneiro Itane"	Saved

===== Judge's scores =====
Judge's scores of the Bottom six
Contestant	Rank	Judge's scores	Result
Chryssa	9th	23	Bottom six
Jimmy	9th	23	Bottom six
Marianna	9th	23	Bottom six
Minas	12th	20	Nominated
Koni	13th	18	Nominated
Alexandra	14th	16	Nominated

==== Live Concert 7 (April 9) ====
Contestants' performances on Live Concert 7
Contestant	Order	Song	Result
Up for elimination
Koni	1	"Love on the Brain"	Saved
Minas	2	"Emina Edo"	Saved
Alexandra	3	"City of Stars"	Eliminated
Regular performances
Stefanos	4	"Ok (Oliki Katastrofi)"	Saved
Penelope	5	"Min Argis"	Nominated
George	6	"Terma ta Psemata"	Student of the week
Aris	7	"Chimonas Einai"	Saved
Giannis	7	"Chimonas Einai"	Saved
Venia	8	"Kapou s' Eho Xanadei"	Saved
Giorgos	9	"Kai Vgale to Kragion sou"	Nominated
Elena D.	10	"Qué Hiciste"	Saved
Chryssa	11	"Kivotos"	Saved
Marianna	12	"Crazy in Love"	Saved
Jimmy	13	"Rebel Yell"	Saved

===== Judge's scores =====
Judge's scores of the Bottom five
Contestant	Rank	Judge's scores	Result
Aris	9th	27	Bottom five
Chryssa	10th	24	Bottom four
Giorgos	11th	22	Nominated
Minas	11th	22	Nominated
Penelope	13th	19 (−4=15)	Nominated

==== Live Concert 8 (April 16) ====
- Group performance: Aris, Chryssa, George, Koni, Stefanos, Venia – "Ela mou"/"Opou kai na sai"/"Ena"/"(I've Had) The Time of My Life"/"Iparhi Zoi"
- Group Performance: Elena D., Giannis, Giorgos, Jimmy, Marianna, Minas, Penelope – "Tainia Fadasias"/"Opou kai na Pao"/"To Koritsi"/"To Fili tis Zois"/"Hot n Cold"

Contestants' performances on Live Concert 8
Contestant	Order	Song	Result
Up for elimination
Penelope	1	"Me Tsigara Varia"	Saved
Minas	2	"Feggaria Hartina"	Eliminated
Giorgos	3	"Re Bagasa"	Saved
Regular performances
Chryssa	4	"Glyka, Glyka, Glykia mou"	Nominated
Aris	5	"To Parti mas"	Saved
Giannis	6	"Xenos gia Senane kai Ehtros"	Nominated
Marianna	7	"I Hate Myself for Loving You"	Saved
Stefanos	8	"Fonaxe Me"	Saved
Venia	9	"Nothing Compares 2 U"	Saved
Elena D.	10	"Paradothika se Sena"	Student of the week
George	11	"I Balada tou Kyr Medium"	Saved
Jimmy	12	"Agria Thalassa"	Nominated
Koni	13	"S' Agapo"	Saved

===== Judge's scores =====
Judge's scores of the Bottom six
Contestant	Rank	Judge's scores	Result
Venia	7th	25	Bottom six
Koni	8th	24	Bottom five
Chryssa	9th	23	Nominated
Marianna	10th	26 (−4=22)	Saved
Giannis	11th	21	Nominated
Jimmy	12th	19	Nominated

==== Live Concert 9 (April 23) ====
- Musical guest: Dionysis Schoinas – "To Parti mas"/"15 Eti Fotos"/"To Kalokairi"/"Omorfainis tin Zoi mou"/"Sygkoinonounta docheia"/"Xipnisa Kapos"/"Mykonos"/"Apomimisi Agapis"/"Ti trela mou Zitas"/"Eimai akoma paidi"/"Sti Diskotek"/"Akros Tolmiro"/"Taram Taram"/"Pote"

Contestants' performances on Live Concert 9
Contestant	Order	Song	Result
Up for elimination
Jimmy	1	"It's Alright"	Saved
Giannis	2	"Zito ta Paraloga"	Saved
Chryssa	3	"Misirlou"	Eliminated
Regular performances
Giorgos	4	"O Amlet tis Selinis"	Saved
Koni	5	"Poses Hiliades Kalokairia"	Saved
Aris	6	"Lost in the night"	Saved
Venia	7	"Poios na Sigkrithei mazi sou"	Saved
Marianna	8	"Ego"	Nominated
Penelope	9	"Den ehei Sidera"	Nominated
George	10	"Someone You Loved"	Saved
Stefanos	11	"Ah na se Xehnaga"	Student of the week
Elena D.	12	"Tous eipes pos"	Nominated

===== Judge's scores =====
Judge's scores of the Bottom six
Contestant	Rank	Judge's scores	Result
George	6th	26	Bottom six
Jimmy	6th	26	Bottom six
Aris	8th	24	Bottom four
Elena D.	9th	22	Nominated
Marianna	9th	22	Nominated
Penelope	11th	22 (−4=18)	Nominated

==== Live Concert 10 (May 7) ====
- The show aired on May 7 because of the Easter holidays.
- Duet performances:
  - Aris & Venia – "Adikrista"
  - Marianna & Stefanos – "Push Ups"
  - Jimmy & Penelope – "Ola ayta pou Fovamai"/"How You Remind Me"
  - George & Giorgos – "Didimotiho Blues"
  - Elena D. & Giannis – "Adiaforos"

Contestants' performances on Live Concert 10
Contestant	Order	Song	Result
Up for elimination
Elena D.	1	"Xana Mana"	Eliminated
Penelope	2	"Afto Pou Xero"	Saved
Marianna	3	"Born This Way"	Saved
Regular performances
Koni	4	"Reggaeton"	Student of the week
George	5	"Pali Pali"	Saved
Jimmy	6	"Personal Jesus"	Nominated
Giannis	7	"Giati to Metanionis"	Saved
Venia	8	"Alitissa"	Saved
Aris	9	"I Stella i Smirnia"	Saved
Stefanos	10	"Ipa kai Ego"	Nominated
Giorgos	11	"Vradia Aximerota"	Nominated

==== Live Concert 11 (May 14) ====
- Musical guest: Josephine – "Paliopaido"/"Ti"/"Magia"/"To Gucci Forema"/"We Will Rock You"/"I Love Rock 'n' Roll"/"Lathos mou"/"Oti Oneirevomoun"/"Ego"

Contestants' performances on Live Concert 11
Contestant	Order	Song	Result
Up for elimination
Jimmy	1	"Love Don't Let Me Go"	Saved
Penelope	2	"En Leyko"	Eliminated
Giorgos	3	"Diamadenia Provlita"	Eliminated
Stefanos	4	"Parania"	Saved
Regular performances
Koni	5	"Blue Jeans"	Nominated
Aris	6	"Espase i Nyhta"	Nominated
Venia	7	"Evaisthisies"	Saved
Marianna	8	"Secret Combination"	Nominated
Giannis	9	"Kathimerina"	Nominated
George	10	"Laura non c'è"	Nominated

==== Live Concert 12 (May 21) ====
- Musical guest: Dimos Anastasiadis – "Tora Milao Ego"/"Mi Hanomaste"/"Taseis Katastrofis (Kovo ti Nychta sta Dyo)"/"Antitheti Trochia"/"Me sena Plai mou"/"Chtise mia Gefyra"/"An M Agapas"/"Esy"

Contestants' performances on Live Concert 12
Contestant	Order	Duet Song	Order	Solo Song	Result
Aris	1	"Patrida mou"	9	"Oneiro Zo"	Saved
Venia	1	"Patrida mou"	5	"An isouna Agapi"	Finalist
Jimmy	2	"To Dylitirio"	8	"Human"	Saved
Marianna	2	"To Dylitirio"	7	"Touch Me"	Eliminated
George	3	"File"	11	"Planodio Tsirko"	Saved
Stefanos	3	"File"	6	"Se Dyo mono Matia"	Saved
Giannis	4	"Emis"	10	"Athina mou"	Saved
Koni	4	"Emis"	12	"No Tears Left to Cry"	Eliminated

==== Live Final (May 28) ====
- Opening performance: Eleni Foureira – "Yayo"/"Reggaeton"/"Ti Koitas"/"El Ritmo Psicodélico"/"Tranquila"/"Loquita"/"Montero (Call Me by Your Name)"/"Pio Erotas Pethaineis"/"Sto Theo Me Paei"/"Mporei"/"Caramela"/"Seven Nation Army"/"Dokimase Me"/"Light It Up"/"Levitating"/"Rhythm Nation"/"Fuego"
- Musical performance: Panos Metaxopoulos – "Se poio Syneffo koimatai to Fegkari"
- Group performance: All contestants – "Havana"/"Ola Kala"/"La Isla Bonita"/"Me sena Plai mou"/"Misirlou"/"Min Argeis"/"Pano ap Ola"/"Just Dance"/"Paradothika se Sena"/"I Got You (I Feel Good)"/"Ego"/"Akrogialies Dilina"

Contestants' performances on Live Final
Contestant	Order	Song of the series	Originally Performed in..	Order	Song	Result
Aris	1	"Ah Koritsi mou"	Live Concert 6	7	"Psemata"	Runner-up
Jimmy	2	"Changed the Way You Kiss Me"	Live Concert 1	8	"Everybody (Backstreet's Back)"	Runner-up
George	3	"Pali Pali"	Live Concert 10	9	"Ayto pou Agapas"	Fifth place
Venia	4	"Lioma Se Gremo"	Live Concert 1	10	"Thimos"	Runner-up
Giannis	5	"Akoma Se Zito"	Live Concert 1	11	"Ton Anthropo ton Lathos"	Sixth place
Stefanos	6	"Mi Hanomaste"	Live Concert 1	12	"Eimai Allou"	Winner

== Ratings ==
Official ratings are taken from AGB Hellas.

Week	Episode		Date	Timeslot (EET)	Ratings (total)	Ratings (ages 18–54)	Source
1	1	Daily episode	February 15, 2021	Monday 05:15pm Tuesday to Friday 06:15pm	12.4%	16.6%	
1	2	Daily episode	February 16, 2021	Monday 05:15pm Tuesday to Friday 06:15pm	9.0%	12.6%	
1	3	Daily episode	February 17, 2021	Monday 05:15pm Tuesday to Friday 06:15pm	8.4%	12.5%	
1	4	Daily episode	February 18, 2021	Monday 05:15pm Tuesday to Friday 06:15pm	7.3%	9.6%	
1	5	Daily episode	February 19, 2021	Monday 05:15pm Tuesday to Friday 06:15pm	8.1%	10.7%	
2	6	Daily episode	February 22, 2021	Mondays to Fridays 06:00pm Friday 09:00pm	8.1%	12.1%	
2	7	Daily episode	February 23, 2021	Mondays to Fridays 06:00pm Friday 09:00pm	7.9%	11.1%	
2	8	Daily episode	February 24, 2021	Mondays to Fridays 06:00pm Friday 09:00pm	8.1%	12.4%	
2	9	Daily episode	February 25, 2021	Mondays to Fridays 06:00pm Friday 09:00pm	8.2%	13.0%	
2	10	Daily episode	February 26, 2021	Mondays to Fridays 06:00pm Friday 09:00pm	8.6%	11.4%	
2	11	Live Concert	February 26, 2021	Mondays to Fridays 06:00pm Friday 09:00pm	16.3%	17.6%	
3	12	Daily episode	March 1, 2021	Mondays to Fridays 06:00pm Friday 09:00pm	9.3%	14.2%	
3	13	Daily episode	March 2, 2021	Mondays to Fridays 06:00pm Friday 09:00pm	6.8%	9.4%	
3	14	Daily episode	March 3, 2021	Mondays to Fridays 06:00pm Friday 09:00pm	5.7%	7.2%	
3	15	Daily episode	March 4, 2021	Mondays to Fridays 06:00pm Friday 09:00pm	8.8%	13.6%	
3	16	Daily episode	March 5, 2021	Mondays to Fridays 06:00pm Friday 09:00pm	7.4%	10.7%	
3	17	Live Concert	March 5, 2021	Mondays to Fridays 06:00pm Friday 09:00pm	12.6%	11.6%	
4	18	Daily episode	March 8, 2021	Mondays to Fridays 06:00pm Friday 09:00pm	8.9%	12.2%	
4	19	Daily episode	March 9, 2021	Mondays to Fridays 06:00pm Friday 09:00pm	9.2%	14.2%	
4	20	Daily episode	March 10, 2021	Mondays to Fridays 06:00pm Friday 09:00pm	7.3%	11.5%	
4	21	Daily episode	March 11, 2021	Mondays to Fridays 06:00pm Friday 09:00pm	8.1%	12.7%	
4	22	Daily episode	March 12, 2021	Mondays to Fridays 06:00pm Friday 09:00pm	7.8%	11.4%	
4	23	Live Concert	March 12, 2021	Mondays to Fridays 06:00pm Friday 09:00pm	8.9%	10.2%	
5	24	Daily episode	March 15, 2021	Mondays to Fridays 06:00pm Friday 09:00pm	8.1%	10.5%	
5	25	Daily episode	March 16, 2021	Mondays to Fridays 06:00pm Friday 09:00pm	9.2%	13.6%	
5	26	Daily episode	March 17, 2021	Mondays to Fridays 06:00pm Friday 09:00pm	9.2%	13.1%	
5	27	Daily episode	March 18, 2021	Mondays to Fridays 06:00pm Friday 09:00pm	8.4%	12.7%	
5	28	Daily episode	March 19, 2021	Mondays to Fridays 06:00pm Friday 09:00pm	8.2%	11.5%	
5	29	Live Concert	March 19, 2021	Mondays to Fridays 06:00pm Friday 09:00pm	10.1%	10.3%	
6	30	Daily episode	March 22, 2021	Monday to Wednesday & Friday 06:00pm Friday 09:00pm	8.6%	12.2%	
6	31	Daily episode	March 23, 2021	Monday to Wednesday & Friday 06:00pm Friday 09:00pm	8.8%	12.1%	
6	32	Daily episode	March 24, 2021	Monday to Wednesday & Friday 06:00pm Friday 09:00pm	7.9%	11.3%	
6	33	Daily episode	March 26, 2021	Monday to Wednesday & Friday 06:00pm Friday 09:00pm	8.8%	13.3%	
6	34	Live Concert	March 26, 2021	Monday to Wednesday & Friday 06:00pm Friday 09:00pm	10.9%	11.0%	
7	35	Daily episode	March 29, 2021	Mondays to Fridays 06:00pm Friday 09:00pm	9.3%	14.2%	
7	36	Daily episode	March 30, 2021	Mondays to Fridays 06:00pm Friday 09:00pm	9.4%	13.2%	
7	37	Daily episode	March 31, 2021	Mondays to Fridays 06:00pm Friday 09:00pm	7.2%	10.5%	
7	38	Daily episode	April 1, 2021	Mondays to Fridays 06:00pm Friday 09:00pm	9.8%	13.7%	
7	39	Daily episode	April 2, 2021	Mondays to Fridays 06:00pm Friday 09:00pm	7.9%	10.1%	
7	40	Live Concert	April 2, 2021	Mondays to Fridays 06:00pm Friday 09:00pm	9.1%	8.6%	
8	41	Daily episode	April 5, 2021	Mondays to Fridays 06:00pm Friday 09:00pm	8.6%	12.4%	
8	42	Daily episode	April 6, 2021	Mondays to Fridays 06:00pm Friday 09:00pm	9.6%	14.1%	
8	43	Daily episode	April 7, 2021	Mondays to Fridays 06:00pm Friday 09:00pm	8.1%	11.4%	
8	44	Daily episode	April 8, 2021	Mondays to Fridays 06:00pm Friday 09:00pm	7.9%	12.9%	
8	45	Daily episode	April 9, 2021	Mondays to Fridays 06:00pm Friday 09:00pm	7.6%	9.6%	
8	46	Live Concert	April 9, 2021	Mondays to Fridays 06:00pm Friday 09:00pm	9.4%	9.8%	
9	47	Daily episode	April 12, 2021	Mondays to Fridays 06:00pm Friday 09:00pm	7.1%	9.9%	
9	48	Daily episode	April 13, 2021	Mondays to Fridays 06:00pm Friday 09:00pm	9%	13.6%	
9	49	Daily episode	April 14, 2021	Mondays to Fridays 06:00pm Friday 09:00pm	7.5%	10%	
9	50	Daily episode	April 15, 2021	Mondays to Fridays 06:00pm Friday 09:00pm	8.9%	12.4%	
9	51	Daily episode	April 16, 2021	Mondays to Fridays 06:00pm Friday 09:00pm	6.7%	9.7%	
9	52	Live Concert	April 16, 2021	Mondays to Fridays 06:00pm Friday 09:00pm	10.3%	10.4%	
10	53	Daily episode	April 19, 2021	Mondays to Fridays 06:00pm Friday 09:00pm	8.1%	11.2%	
10	54	Daily episode	April 20, 2021	Mondays to Fridays 06:00pm Friday 09:00pm	8.0%	9.3%	
10	55	Daily episode	April 21, 2021	Mondays to Fridays 06:00pm Friday 09:00pm	9.4%	11.2%	
10	56	Daily episode	April 22, 2021	Mondays to Fridays 06:00pm Friday 09:00pm	8.3%	10.9%	
10	57	Daily episode	April 23, 2021	Mondays to Fridays 06:00pm Friday 09:00pm	8.0%	10.4%	
10	58	Live Concert	April 23, 2021	Mondays to Fridays 06:00pm Friday 09:00pm	9.6%	9.3%	
11	59	Daily episode	April 26, 2021	Mondays to Fridays 06:00pm Friday 09:00pm	9.0%	9.1%	
11	60	Daily episode	April 27, 2021	Mondays to Fridays 06:00pm Friday 09:00pm	9.2%	12.0%	
11	61	Daily episode	April 28, 2021	Mondays to Fridays 06:00pm Friday 09:00pm	9.0%	13.4%	
12	62	Daily episode	May 3, 2021	Mondays to Fridays 06:00pm Friday 09:00pm	6.4%	7.1%	
12	63	Daily episode	May 4, 2021	Mondays to Fridays 06:00pm Friday 09:00pm	8.5%	10.7%	
12	64	Daily episode	May 5, 2021	Mondays to Fridays 06:00pm Friday 09:00pm	6.9%	8.7%	
12	65	Daily episode	May 6, 2021	Mondays to Fridays 06:00pm Friday 09:00pm	7.9%	9.5%	
12	66	Daily episode	May 7, 2021	Mondays to Fridays 06:00pm Friday 09:00pm	7.8%	9.7%	
12	67	Live Concert	May 7, 2021	Mondays to Fridays 06:00pm Friday 09:00pm	11.7%	12.2%	
13	68	Daily episode	May 10, 2021	Mondays to Fridays 06:00pm Friday 09:00pm	10.0%	14.2%	
13	69	Daily episode	May 11, 2021	Mondays to Fridays 06:00pm Friday 09:00pm	8.2%	12.3%	
13	70	Daily episode	May 12, 2021	Mondays to Fridays 06:00pm Friday 09:00pm	9.0%	11.3%	
13	71	Daily episode	May 13, 2021	Mondays to Fridays 06:00pm Friday 09:00pm	8.0%	11.1%	
13	72	Daily episode	May 14, 2021	Mondays to Fridays 06:00pm Friday 09:00pm	8.7%	12.4%	
13	73	Live Concert	May 14, 2021	Mondays to Fridays 06:00pm Friday 09:00pm	10.0%	10.8%	
14	74	Daily episode	May 17, 2021	Mondays to Fridays 06:00pm Friday 09:00pm	11.0%	16.2%	
14	75	Daily episode	May 18, 2021	Mondays to Fridays 06:00pm Friday 09:00pm	8.4%	11.8%	
14	76	Daily episode	May 19, 2021	Mondays to Fridays 06:00pm Friday 09:00pm	7.9%	10.1%	
14	77	Daily episode	May 20, 2021	Mondays to Fridays 06:00pm Friday 09:00pm	6.7%	9.8%	
14	78	Daily episode	May 21, 2021	Mondays to Fridays 06:00pm Friday 09:00pm	10.1%	10.4%	
14	79	Live Concert	May 21, 2021	Mondays to Fridays 06:00pm Friday 09:00pm	12.3%	12.9%	
15	80	Daily episode	May 24, 2021	Mondays to Fridays 06:00pm Friday 09:00pm	9.4%	12.2%	
15	81	Daily episode	May 25, 2021	Mondays to Fridays 06:00pm Friday 09:00pm	8.9%	13.6%	
15	82	Daily episode	May 26, 2021	Mondays to Fridays 06:00pm Friday 09:00pm	8.2%	11.6%	
15	83	Daily episode	May 27, 2021	Mondays to Fridays 06:00pm Friday 09:00pm	8.8%	14.8%	
15	84	Daily episode	May 28, 2021	Mondays to Fridays 06:00pm Friday 09:00pm	9.9%	13.5%	
15	85	Live Concert	May 28, 2021	Mondays to Fridays 06:00pm Friday 09:00pm	14.5%	15.6%	
