= Big Brother (Greek TV series) season 7 =

Big Brother
- Season 7
- Presented by: Grigoris Gountaras; Natali Kakava
- No. of days: 113
- No. of housemates: 22
- Winner: Nikos Taklis
- Runner-up: Evdokia Tsagkli

Release
- Original network: Skai TV (Greece); Sigma TV (Cyprus)
- Original release: 29 August – 17 December 2021

Additional information
- Filming dates: 27 August – 17 December 2021

Season chronology
- ← Previous; Season 6

Big Brother Greece 7 is the seventh season of the Greek reality television series Big Brother. The show began airing on 29 August 2021 on Skai TV. It is the second season of Big Brother to air on Skai TV. The show also simulcast live in Cyprus on Sigma TV like in the last season.

The couple Grigoris Gountaras and Natali Kakava are the two new hosts of the show, replacing Harry Varthakouris. Afroditi Grammeli is the new opinionist, replacing Andreas Mikroutsikos. The winner won €100,000.

== Housemates ==
On the first day, fourteen housemates entered the house.

Name	Age on entry	Hometown	Occupation	Day entered	Day exited	Status
Nikos Taklis	30	Santorini	Travel agent	1	113	Winner
Evdokia Tsagkli	30	Thessaloniki	Party organizer	1	113	Runner-up
Panagiotis Petsas	22	Athens	Model and influencer	1	113	3rd Place
Angelita Pieridi	25	Athens	Singer	1	113	4th Place
Mary Varsami	36	Athens	Communications and sustainable development company owner	1	106	Evicted
Maria Alexoglou	32	Athens	Singer	29	99	Evicted
Anna Eleftheriou	35	Cyprus	Reality star	29	92	Evicted
Nasos Dallis	35	Athens	DJ	39	85	Evicted
Costas Stylianakis	34	Tympaki	Cafe owner	1	78	Evicted
Isidoros Dounis	25	Karystos	Beautician	1	71	Evicted
Samantha Misovic	18	Crete	Model	1	64	Evicted
Michalis Evripiotis	32	Naxos	Travel agent	39	57	Evicted
Michalis Gavalas	33	Amorgos	Cocktail bar owner	29	50	Evicted
Violeta Aresti	27	Cyprus	Translator	39	47	Walked
Steve Milatos	29	Athens	Model and influencer	1	43	Evicted
Celia Karamolegou	23	Athens	TikToker and Influencer	1	36	Evicted
Nikolas Tsirlis	33	Glyfada	Trader	8	29	Evicted
Sofia Alexanian	37	Xanthi	Former actress and broker	8	22	Evicted
Stefanos Nikolos	35	Trikala	Farmer	1	20	Walked
Meletis Gavalas	29	Athens	Telecommunications store employee	1	15	Evicted
Giota Mylona	38	Thessaloniki	Computer science student	1	12	Walked
Elena Spanou	23	Alexandroupoli	Coffee bar employee and student	1	8	Evicted

== Nominations table ==
	Week 1	Week 2	Week 3	Week 4	Week 5	Week 6	Week 7		Week 8		Week 9	Week 10	Week 11		Week 12		Week 13		Week 14		Week 15	Week 16 Final		Nominations received
Nikos	Samantha; Mary	Celia; Angelita	Steve; Celia	Nikolas; Celia	Angelita; Samantha	Steve; Violeta	Samantha	Samantha; Panagiotis	Samantha	Samantha; Michalis E	Samantha; Angelita	Angelita; Costas	Angelita	Angelita; Panagiotis	Angelita; Mary	Panagiotis; Angelita	Angelita	Angelita; Anna	Angelita	Angelita	No; Nominations	Winner (Day 113)		24
Evdokia	Samantha; Elena	Celia; Samantha	Steve; Nikolas	Steve; Nikolas	Samantha; Angelita	Samantha; Angelita	Samantha	Panagiotis; Samantha	Samantha	Samantha; Angelita	Samantha; Angelita	Costas; Anna	Anna	Anna; Costas	Anna	Anna; Maria	Anna	Anna; Maria	Maria	Maria	No; Nominations	Runner-up (Day 113)		48
Panagiotis	Elena; Nikos	Mary; Meletis	Sofia; Mary	Nikos; Mary	Mary; Evdokia	Evdokia; Nikos	Evdokia	Mary; Isidoros	Isidoros	Mary; Isidoros	Mary; Isidoros	Isidoros; Mary	Mary	Anna; Nikos	Mary	Anna; Maria	Mary; Mary	Anna; Maria	Mary; Mary	Maria	Finalist	Third place (Day 113)		25
Angelita	Mary; Giota	Mary; Meletis	Evdokia; Sofia	Evdokia; Nikos	Evdokia; Mary	Evdokia; Mary	Evdokia	Nikos; Costas	Isidoros	Isidoros; Mary	Mary; Isidoros	Isidoros; Mary	Mary	Anna; Nikos	Mary	Anna; Evdokia	Mary	Evdokia; Nikos	Mary	Evdokia	No; Nominations	Fourth place (Day 113)		36
Mary	Meletis; Nikos	Angelita; Panagiotis	Steve; Celia	Nikolas; Samantha	Angelita; Celia	Samantha; Steve	Samantha	Samantha; Panagiotis	Panagiotis	Angelita; Michalis E	Samantha; Angelita	Angelita; Nasos	Nasos	Panagiotis; Angelita	Nasos	Nasos; Panagiotis	Angelita	Angelita; Nikos	Angelita	Angelita	No; Nominations	Evicted (Day 106)		46
Maria	Not in House				Steve; Panagiotis	Steve; Michalis G	Violeta	Panagiotis; Samantha	Panagiotis	Michalis E Samantha	Samantha; Nasos	Nasos; Nikos	Nasos	Panagiotis; Evdokia	Nasos	Nasos; Panagiotis	Evdokia	Evdokia; Nikos	Evdokia	Evdokia	Evicted (Day 99)			10
Anna	Not in House				Steve; Panagiotis	Steve; Samantha	Panagiotis	Panagiotis; Samantha	Panagiotis	Angelita; Samantha	Angelita; Evdokia	Angelita; Nasos	Nasos	Panagiotis; Angelita	Nasos	Nasos; Panagiotis	Evdokia	Evdokia; Angelita	Evicted (Day 92)					17
Nasos	Not in House					Angelita; Isidoros	Violeta	Samantha; Costas	Samantha	Samantha; Michalis E	Isidoros; Mary	Isidoros; Mary	Mary	Anna; Nikos	Mary	Anna; Maria	Evicted (Day 85)							15
Costas	Samantha; Meletis	Isidoros; Evdokia	Sofia; Evdokia	Evdokia; Nikos	Evdokia; Isidoros	Evdokia; Nikos	Evdokia	Nikos; Isidoros	Evdokia	Evdokia; Isidoros	Evdokia; Isidoros	Isidoros; Nikos	Anna	Anna; Nikos	Evicted (Day 78)									9
Isidoros	In Secret Room	Evdokia; Steve	Steve; Evdokia	Nikolas; Steve	Panagiotis; Samantha	Steve; Costas	Panagiotis	Samantha; Panagiotis	Panagiotis	Angelita; Michalis E	Angelita; Samantha	Angelita; Nasos	Evicted (Day 71)											26
Samantha	Steve; Mary	Mary; Evdokia	Evdokia; Sofia	Evdokia; Nikos	Evdokia; Mary	Evdokia; Mary	Evdokia	Nikos; Costas	Isidoros	Isidoros; Mary	Evdokia; Isidoros	Evicted (Day 64)												40
Michalis E	Not in House					Maria; Nikos	Violeta	Mary; Costas	Isidoros	Isidoros; Mary	Evicted (Day 57)													5
Michalis G	Not in House				Isidoros; Mary	Evdokia; Maria	Evdokia	Banned	Evicted (Day 50)															1
Violeta	Not in House					Mary; Evdokia	Nasos	Walked (Day 47)																4
Steve	Samantha; Stefanos	Mary; Isidoros	Evdokia; Sofia	Evdokia; Nikos	Evdokia; Celia	Evdokia; Nikos	Evicted (Day 43)																	16
Celia	Samantha; Elena	Mary; Evdokia	Sofia; Mary	Evdokia; Mary	Evdokia; Mary	Evicted (Day 36)																		8
Nikolas	Not in House	Samantha; Meletis	Sofia; Evdokia	Evdokia; Nikos	Evicted (Day 29)																			6
Sofia	Not in House	Isidoros; Celia	Steve; Nikolas	Evicted (Day 22)																				7
Stefanos	Meletis; Elena	Mary; Meletis	Walked (Day 20)																					2
Meletis	Samantha; Costas	Samantha; Angelita	Evicted (Day 15)																					8
Giota	Samantha; Meletis	Walked (Day 12)																						1
Elena	Panagiotis; Stefanos	Evicted (Day 8)																						4
Notes																								
House captain	Celia	Nikos	Isidoros	Angelita	Nikos	Panagiotis	none	Maria	none	Nikos	Costas	Evdokia	none	Maria	Nikos		Panagiotis		Panagiotis		none			
Nominated (pre-veto)	Elena; Meletis; Samantha	Evdokia; Mary; Meletis	Evdokia; Sofia; Steve	Evdokia; Nikolas; Nikos	Angelita; Evdokia; Mary; Panagiotis; Samantha	Evdokia; Nikos; Steve	none	Costas; Evdokia; Michalis G Panagiotis; Samantha	Isidoros; Panagiotis	Isidoros; Michalis E Panagiotis; Samantha	Angelita; Isidoros; Samantha	Angelita; Isidoros; Nasos	Mary; Nasos	Anna; Nasos; Nikos; Panagiotis	Mary	Anna; Maria; Mary; Nasos; Panagiotis	Mary	Angelita; Anna; Evdokia; Mary; Nikos	Mary	Angelita; Evdokia; Maria; Mary	none			
Veto winner	Angelita; Evdokia	Samantha	Samantha	Evdokia	Evdokia	Nasos	none	Michalis E	Nikos	Samantha	Maria; Mary	Costas	Maria	Angelita	none	Angelita	none	Maria	none	Angelita	none			
Veto winner	Isidoros	Samantha	Samantha	Evdokia	Evdokia	Nasos	none	Michalis E	Nikos	Samantha	Maria; Mary	Costas	Maria	Angelita	none	Angelita	none	Maria	none	Angelita	none			
Against public vote	Elena; Meletis; Panagiotis	Evdokia; Mary; Meletis	Evdokia; Sofia; Steve	Mary; Nikolas; Nikos; Steve	Angelita; Celia; Isidoros; Mary; Panagiotis; Samantha; Steve	Evdokia; Nikos; Steve	none	Costas; Evdokia; Michalis G Nikos; Panagiotis	none	Angelita; Isidoros; Mary; Michalis E Panagiotis	Angelita; Evdokia; Samantha	Isidoros; Mary; Nasos	none	Anna; Costas; Evdokia; Nasos; Nikos	none	Anna; Evdokia; Maria; Mary; Nasos	none	Angelita; Anna; Evdokia; Nikos	none	Evdokia; Maria; Mary	Angelita; Evdokia; Mary; Nikos	Angelita; Evdokia; Nikos; Panagiotis		
Walked	none	Giota	Stefanos	none				Violeta	none															
Evicted	Elena; Fewest votes to save	Meletis; Fewest votes to save	Sofia; Fewest votes to save	Nikolas; Fewest votes to save	Celia; Fewest votes to save	Steve; Fewest votes to save	No; Eviction	Michalis G Fewest votes to save	No; Eviction	Michalis E Fewest votes to save	Samantha; Fewest votes to save	Isidoros; Fewest votes to save	No; Eviction	Costas; Fewest votes to save	No; Eviction	Nasos; Fewest votes to save	No; Eviction	Anna; Fewest votes to save	No; Eviction	Maria; Fewest votes to save	Mary; Fewest votes to save	Angelita; Fewest votes (out of 4)	Panagiotis; Fewest votes (out of 3)	
Evicted	Elena; Fewest votes to save	Meletis; Fewest votes to save	Sofia; Fewest votes to save	Nikolas; Fewest votes to save	Celia; Fewest votes to save	Steve; Fewest votes to save	No; Eviction	Michalis G Fewest votes to save	No; Eviction	Michalis E Fewest votes to save	Samantha; Fewest votes to save	Isidoros; Fewest votes to save	No; Eviction	Costas; Fewest votes to save	No; Eviction	Nasos; Fewest votes to save	No; Eviction	Anna; Fewest votes to save	No; Eviction	Maria; Fewest votes to save	Mary; Fewest votes to save	Evdokia; Fewest votes (out of 2)	Nikos; Most votes to win	

== Ratings ==
Official ratings are taken from AGB Hellas.
