= Big Brother (Greek TV series) season 1 =

Big Brother
- Season 1
- Presented by: Andreas Mikroutsikos
- No. of days: 113
- No. of housemates: 12
- Winner: Giorgos Triantafyllidis
- Runner-up: Prodromos Kathiniotis

Release
- Original network: ANT1
- Original release: 10 September – 31 December 2001

Season chronology
- Next → Season 2

Big Brother Greece 1, was the first season of the Greek reality television series Big Brother. The show followed twelve contestants, known as housemates, who were isolated from the outside world for an extended period of time in a custom built House. Each week, one or more of the housemates were evicted by a public vote. The last remaining housemate, Giorgos Triantafyllidis, was declared the winner, winning a cash prize of 50,000,000 GRD.

The season lasted 113 days and was presented by Andreas Mikroutsikos. It launched on ANT1 on September 10, 2001 and ended on December 31, 2001. This season is considered the most successful season out of the three to follow on ANT1, with massive viewership. Its finale on New Year's Eve attracted more than 80% of the television share.

Important personalities from the season include runner-up Prodromos Kathiniotis who later went on to release a studio album and also dab in TV hosting.

== Housemates ==
Name	Hometown	Day entered	Day exited	Result
Giorgos Triantafyllidis	—	1	113	Winner
Prodormos Kathiniotis	Athens	1	113	Runner-up
Kostas Mpobolos	Arta	1	112	Evicted
Nikol Zoylamogloy	Athens	1	109	Evicted
Dora Archontaki	Athens	1	106	Evicted
Ntinos Doylkeridis	Stuttgart, Germany	1	99	Evicted
Xristos Xanthopoylos	Athens	1	85	Evicted
Katerina Kontolaimoy	Athens	1	71	Evicted
Elina Priakoy	Athens	1	57	Evicted
Rea Antoniadoy	Istanbul, Turkey	1	43	Evicted
Mairi Skordou	Athens	1	29	Evicted
Filippos Charis	Attica	1	15	Evicted

== Nominations Table ==
	Week 2	Week 3	Week 6	Week 8	Week 10	Week 12	Week 14	Week 15	Week 16		
	Week 2	Week 3	Week 6	Week 8	Week 10	Week 12	Week 14	Week 15	Day 109	Day 112	Final
Giorgos	Filippos; Dora	Kostas; Mairi	Rea; Dora	Elina; Dora	Dora; Kostas	Xristos; Dora	Ntinos; Nikol	Nikol; Dora	No nominations	No nominations	Winner (Day 113)
Prodromos	Filippos; Dora	Mairi; Dora	Dora; Nikol	Elina; Nikol	Xristos; Katerina	Xristos; Nikol	Kostas; Nikol	Nikol; Kostas	No nominations	No nominations	Runner-up (Day 113)
Kostas	Nikol; Dora	Mairi; Nikol	Nikol; Dora	Nikol; Dora	Giorgos; Dora	Dora; Nikol	Prodromos; Dora	Dora; Nikol	No nominations	No nominations	Evicted (Day 112)
Nikol	Kostas; Prodromos	Kostas; Prodromos	Rea; Kostas	Elina; Prodromos	Prodromos; Kostas	Xristos; Kostas	Ntinos; Kostas	Kostas; Dora	No nominations	Evicted (Day 109)	
Dora	Mairi; Filippos	Mairi; Nikol	Nikol; Rea	Elina; Nikol	Nikol; Katerina	Nikol; Xristos	Ntinos; Nikol	Prodromos; Kostas	Evicted (Day 106)		
Ntinos	Xristos; Dora	Xristos; Rea	Rea; Dora	Nikol; Xristos	Katerina; Xristos	Xristos; Nikol	Dora; Nikol	Evicted (Day 99)			
Xristos	Filippos; Rea	Rea; Ntinos	Rea; Nikol	Elina; Prodromos	Katerina; Nikol	Nikol; Prodromos	Evicted (Day 85)				
Katerina	Filippos; Rea	Kostas; Mairi	Rea; Dora	Kostas; Dora	Dora; Kostas	Evicted (Day 71)					
Elina	Mairi; Dora	Mairi; Dora	Dora; Rea	Nikol; Xristos	Evicted (Day 57)						
Rea	Dora; Filippos	Kostas; Nikol	Dora; Nikol	Evicted (Day 43)							
Mairi	Dora; Filippos	Xristos; Kostas	Evicted (Day 29)								
Filippos	Dora; Elina	Evicted (Day 15)									
Up for eviction	Filippos; Kostas; Ntinos	Giorgos; Mairi; Ntinos	Giorgos; Prodromos; Rea	Elina; Giorgos; Ntinos; Prodromos	Katerina; Ntinos; Xristos	Giorgos; Nikol; Xristos	Dora; Giorgos; Prodromos; Ntinos	Dora; Giorgos; Kostas; Prodromos	All; Housemates		
Evicted	Filippos; 46.40% to evict	Mairi; 46.67% to evict	Rea ?% to evict	Elina; 37.04% to evict	Katerina ?% to evict	Xristos; 46.71% to evict	Ntinos; 48.48% to evict	Dora; 40.93% to evict	Nikol; 29.43% to evict	Kostas; 40.47% to evict	Prodromos; 56.43% to evict
Survived	Kostas; ~37.00% to evict Ntinos; ~16.00% to evict	Ntinos; 32.20% to evict Giorgos; 21.13% to evict	Giorgos ?% to evict Prodromos ?% to evict	Prodromos; 35.09% to evict Ntinos; 25.63% to evict Giorgos; 2.24% to evict	Ntinos ?% to evict Xristos ?% to evict	Giorgos; 27.69% to evict Nikol; 25.60% to evict	Dora; 24.83% to evict Kostas; 15.78% to evict Prodromos; 10.91% to evict	Kostas; 21.99% to evict Prodromos; 21.85% to evict Giorgos; 15.23% to evict	Prodromos; 26.45% to evict Giorgos; 25.02% to evict Kostas; 19.09% to evict	Giorgos; 35.64% to evict Prodromos; 23.89% to evict	Giorgos; 43.57% to evict
