= Big Brother (Greek TV series) season 3 =

Big Brother
- Season 3
- Presented by: Andreas Mikroutsikos
- No. of days: 113
- No. of housemates: 18
- Winner: Thodoris Ispoglov
- Runner-up: Patricia Lorentzo

Release
- Original network: ANT1
- Original release: 10 March – 30 June 2003

Season chronology
- ← Previous; Season 2 Next → Season 4

The Wall was the third season of the Greek reality television series Big Brother. The show followed eighteen contestants, known as housemates, who were isolated from the outside world for an extended period of time in a custom-built house.

In 2003, Big Brother Greece 3 launched under the name The Wall on ANT1 on March 10 and ended on June 30, last 113 days. This season introduced the notion of "The Battle," in which the house is separated into a luxurious half and a poor half, with two teams of housemates constantly fighting for time in the luxurious half. Each week, one or more of the housemates were evicted by a public vote. The last remaining housemate, Thodores Jspógloy, was declared the winner, winning a cash prize of €300,000.

The show presented by Andreas Mikroutsikos. Expectations for the format proved unsuccessful with ANT1 choosing not to use it again.

== Housemates ==
Name	Age on entry	Residence	Occupation	Day entered	Day exited	Result
Thodoris Ispoglou	33	Kozani	Guide	Unknown	113	Winner
Patritsia Lorentzo	32	Brazil	Web designer	Unknown	113	Runner-up
Almperto Nti Matzisio	28	Sicily - Peloponnese	Businessman (flower trade)	Unknown	113	3rd Place
Olga Tsoni	27	Agrinio	Trader	Unknown	113	4th Place
Christina Kiousi	23	Athens	Secretary	Unknown	Unknown	Evicted
Kleanthis Triantapullopoulos	52	Athens	Pensioner OA	Unknown	Unknown	Evicted
Giorgos Beléntzas	29	Athens	Businessman; Travel agent	Unknown	Unknown	Evicted
Giorgos Karkabilas	42	Trikala	Truck driver	Unknown	Unknown	Evicted
Ntaizi Papakonstantinou	30	Athens	Psychologist	Unknown	Unknown	Evicted
Michalis Apostolidis	63	Rhodes	Civil Servant	Unknown	Unknown	Evicted
Roula Vrophopoulou	53	Athens	Retired; Flight attendant	Unknown	Unknown	Evicted
Giannis Atzios	24	Thessaloniki	Bartender	Unknown	Unknown	Evicted
Marios Dramalis	37	Thessaloniki	Businessman	Unknown	Unknown	Evicted
Tzortzis Monogios	23	Mykonos	Computer student	Unknown	Unknown	Evicted
Ariana Pakitzi	35	Thessaloniki	Travel agent	Unknown	Unknown	Evicted
Debora Dimou	36	Grevena	Private employee	Unknown	Unknown	Unknown
Gogo Garufallou	23	Piraeus	Presenter; Singer	Unknown	Unknown	Unknown
Sissy Giannakopoulou	21	Thessaloniki	Bar woman	Unknown	Unknown	Unknown

== Nominations Table ==
No information about 3 housemates: Debora, Gogo & Sissy.

	#1	#2	#3	#4	#5	#6	#7	#8	#9	#10	#11	Final Day 113
Thodoris	? ?	? ?	? ?	? ?	? ?	? ?	? ?	? ?	? ?	? ?	? ?	Winner (Day 113)
Patritsia	? ?	? ?	? ?	? ?	? ?	? ?	? ?	? ?	? ?	? ?	? ?	Runner-up (Day 113)
Almperto	? ?	? ?	? ?	? ?	? ?	? ?	? ?	? ?	? ?	? ?	? ?	Third Place (Day 113)
Olga	? ?	? ?	? ?	? ?	? ?	? ?	? ?	? ?	? ?	? ?	? ?	Fourth Place (Day 113)
Christina	? ?	? ?	? ?	? ?	? ?	? ?	? ?	? ?	? ?	? ?	? ?	Evicted
Kleanthis	? ?	? ?	? ?	? ?	? ?	? ?	? ?	? ?	? ?	? ?	? ?	Evicted
Giorgos B	? ?	? ?	? ?	? ?	? ?	? ?	? ?	? ?	? ?	? ?	? ?	Evicted
Giorgos K	? ?	? ?	? ?	? ?	? ?	? ?	? ?	? ?	? ?	? ?	Evicted	
Ntaizi	? ?	? ?	? ?	? ?	? ?	? ?	? ?	? ?	? ?	Evicted		
Michalis** (re-entered)	Unknown								Re-evicted			
Royla	? ?	? ?	? ?	? ?	? ?	? ?	? ?	Evicted				
Yannis	? ?	? ?	? ?	? ?	? ?	? ?	Evicted					
Marios** (re-entered)	Unknown					Re-evicted						
Tzortzis	? ?	? ?	? ?	? ?	Evicted							
Marios*	? ?	? ?	? ?	Evicted								
Michalis*	? ?	? ?	Evicted									
Ariana	? ?	Evicted										
Up for eviction	Ariana; Giorgos K Royla	Christina; Giorgos B Giorgos K Michalis	Giorgos B Giorgos K Kleanthis; Marios; Tzortzis	Giorgos B Tzortzis	Marios; Olga	Giorgos B Yannis	Giorgos B Royla	Gogo; Michalis	Ntaizi; Olga	Giorgos B Giorgos K	Almperto; Christina; Giorgos B Kleanthis; Olga; Patritsia	Almperto; Olga; Patritsia; Thodoris
Evicted	Ariana; 75.4% to evict	Michalis; 42.7% to evict	Marios; 67.7% to evict	Tzortzis; 53% to evict	Marios; 56% to evict	Yannis; 56.5% to evict	Royla; 79% to evict	Michalis; 81% to evict	Ntaizi; 52% to evict	Giorgos K 56% to evict	Giorgos B 41% to evict	Olga; 3.2% to win
Evicted	Ariana; 75.4% to evict	Michalis; 42.7% to evict	Marios; 67.7% to evict	Tzortzis; 53% to evict	Marios; 56% to evict	Yannis; 56.5% to evict	Royla; 79% to evict	Michalis; 81% to evict	Ntaizi; 52% to evict	Giorgos K 56% to evict	Kleanthis; 16.2% to evict	Almperto; 6.8% to win
Evicted	Ariana; 75.4% to evict	Michalis; 42.7% to evict	Marios; 67.7% to evict	Tzortzis; 53% to evict	Marios; 56% to evict	Yannis; 56.5% to evict	Royla; 79% to evict	Michalis; 81% to evict	Ntaizi; 52% to evict	Giorgos K 56% to evict	Christina; 16.2% to evict	Patritsia; 22% to win
Saved	Royla; 21.4% Giorgos K 3.2%	Christina; 31.4% Giorgos B 22.4% Giorgos K 3.5%	Giorgos B 13.1% Tzortzis; 10.8% Kleanthis; 4.3% Giorgos K 4.1%	Giorgos B 47%	Olga; 44%	Giorgos B 43.5%	Giorgos B 21%	Gogo; 19%	Olga; 48%	Giorgos B 44%	Almperto; 12.0% Olga; 11.5% Patritsia; 3.1%	Thodoris; 68% to win
