= Roula Koromila =

Greek television and talk show presenter

- Born: Theodora Koromila; February 16, 1957 (age 69); Athens, Kingdom of Greece
- Occupation: Television presenter
- Years active: 1989–present
- Spouse(s): Panos Michalopoulos (m. 1988; div. 1990); Nasos Galakteros (m. 2000; div. 2007)

Theodora "Roula" Koromila (Greek: Θεοδώρα "Ρούλα" Κορομηλά; born on February 16, 1957) is a Greek television and talk show presenter.

== Early life ==
Roula Koromila was born in Athens on February 16, 1957. Her father comes from Messinia and her mother from Rhodes. Her father was a soldier and spent her childhood from city to city while studying as a secretary. She has one brother, Thanasis and one sister, Lena.

== Television career ==
In the mid-80s Koromila began working in public television. From 1989 to 1991 she presented "Mia Kalimera Einai Auti" on ET1. In 1991 she moved to the newly formed channel ANT1, launching the morning show "Proinos Kafes", which enjoyed great success. She presented the show, enjoying high ratings, until 1994, while also launching the first Greek television variety show in 1992, "Ciao Ant1".

In 1994 she terminated her contract with ANT1, and, after a legal dispute with her former channel, moved to rival channel MEGA. There she launched the high-budget variety show Bravo in 1994, which lasted until 2000. The show enjoyed tremendous success, with guests such as Madonna , Ricky Martin and Eros Ramazzoti. The show featured various special seasonal episodes (namely for Christmas Eve and Easter) at various high-profile localations, such as Syros's City Hall and Lycabettus Theatre. The show included singing and sketches, among other segments. Concurrently, Koromila presented "Bravissimo" (1995-6) and "E, Nai Loipon" (1997-8). Koromila also introduced the concept of television marathons on Greek television during this period. Among the most notable was the 1996 marathon dedicated to children suffering from brain paralysis. The marathon lasted for 30 consecutive hours, raising 650 million drachmae. To honour Koromila, Cerebral Palsy Greece renamed the hall of the rehabilitation center "Roula Koromila Hall".

In 2001 Koromila moved to Alpha, presenting the morning show "Enteka kai Kati", which was later renamed "Kalos Tous", which lasted until 2004, establishing the channel's morning slot. At the same time, she intermittently presented the show "... Sti Roula", which included such high-profile, exclusive guests as Haris Alexiou, Nikos Karvelas and Sakis Rouvas. For the 2004–2005 season Koromila moved to Star channel to present "Ole", before returning to Alpha in 2006 to launch "3 Euxes", which was later renamed "Zoi san Oneiro". In 2007 she acted as a mentor on "TV Stars: Parousiaste Live", while from 2007 to 2012 she served as a programme consultant on Alpha. After overcoming health struggles she returned to Greek TV on April 26 2010, to present "Greek Idol". The show's premiere enjoyed great success, achieving an overall 34.9% ratings share, while the first fifteen minutes of Koromila's reappearance on-air enjoyed a 43.2% ratings share. On October 3 2010, she took on the presentation of "Big Brother". In the Spring of 2011 she presented the second "Greek Idol" season. In 2013 she terminated her contract with Alpha.

On April 2 2014, she returned to MEGA to serve as a judge on "Just the 2 of Us", while on April 16 2016, she revived her highly successful show "Bravo", under the title "Bravo Roula" on the newly-formed channel "EPSILON". Koromila unexpectedly ended her contract with EPSILON before the transmission of the final celebratory episode from Syros, citing financial differences and inefficient co-operation with the channel's administration.

== Personal life ==
Her first husband was the actor Panos Michalopoulos, with whom she met in 1981, married in 1988 and divorced two years later. In 2000, Koromila married basketball player Nasos Galakteros, with whom she separated after seven years and later divorced.She is also known for her relationship with Italian director Stefano Sartini, which lasted for six years and for a brief relationship with singer Stelios Rokkos.

Koromila has been honored with numerous television awards and is known as the national television presenter.

== Filmography ==
=== Television ===
Year	Title	Role(s)	Notes
1989–1991	This is a good morning	Herself (host)	Daytime talk show
1991–1994	Proinos Kafes	Herself (host)	Daytime talk show; season 1-3
1992	The Bakuria	Herself	Episode: "Aerovicks"
1992–1994	Ciao Ant1	Herself (host)	Weekend variety show; also creator
1993	The widower and the worst	Herself	1 episode
1994	The soldiers of Greece	Herself	Episode: "Loofah with Proinos Kafes"
1994–2000	Bravo!	Herself (host)	Weekend variety show; also creator
1995	Petros and his girls	Herself	Episodes: "Aunt Roula" & "Such an aunt to have"
1995–1996	Bravissimo!	Herself (host)	Daytime talk show on MEGA; also creator
1996	MEGA Telethon with Roula Koromila	Herself (host)	TV special
1997–1998	So yeah!	Herself (host)	Daytime talk show on MEGA; also creator
1999	MEGA Telethon with Roula Koromila	Herself (host)	TV special
2001–2004	11 or something / Welcome!	Herself (host)	Daytime talk show on Alpha TV; also creator
2002	to Roula	Herself (host)	Talk show; also creator
2004–2005	Ole!	Herself (host)	Daytime talk show on STAR; also creator
2006	Three Wishes / Life as a Dream	Herself (host)	Sunday variety show; cancelled after 3 episodes
2007–2008	TV Stars: Present	Herself (player advisor)	Talent show
2010–2011	Greek Idol	Herself (host)	Season 1-2
2010–2011	Big Brother Greece	Herself (host)	Season 5
2014	Just the 2 Of Us	Herself (judge)	Season 2
2016	Bravo Roula!	Herself (host)	Saturday variety talk show; also creator
2020	New Year's Eve at home with MEGA	Herself (host)	TV special
2021	At home with MEGA	Herself (host)	Episode: "Stamatis Spanoudakis"
2022-2023	At home with MEGA	Herself (host)	Saturday talk show; season 4
