= Big Brother (Greek TV series) season 2 =

Big Brother
- Season 2
- Presented by: Andreas Mikroutsikos
- No. of days: 116
- No. of housemates: 14
- Winner: Alexandros Moskhos
- Runner-up: Kostas Karatzias

Release
- Original network: ANT1
- Original release: 8 March – 1 July 2002

Season chronology
- ← Previous; Season 1 Next → Season 3

Big Brother Greece 2, was the second season of the Greek reality television series Big Brother. The show followed fourteen contestants, known as housemates, who were isolated from the outside world for an extended period of time in a custom-built house. Each week, one or more of the housemates were evicted by a public vote.

The last remaining housemate, Alexandros Moskhos, was declared the winner, winning a cash prize of €150,000.

The season lasted 116 days and was presented by Andreas Mikroutsikos. It launched on ANT1 on March 8, 2002 and ended on July 1, 2002.

== Housemate election ==
A week before the launch of the season, the public was able to choose two of the housemates, one male and one female. The voted between 18 candidates chosen by the producers. The public vote started on March 2, 2002

Finally, Panagiotis and Tina have received the most votes and became official housemates.

Female
	2–3 March	4–5 March	6–7 March		9–10 March	Result
Tina Evangelou	54.86%	Advanced	Advanced		44%	Official Housemate
Maria Giannakopoulou		69%	Advanced		41%	Not Selected
Nikoleta Koutsonikoli			44%	Advanced	15%	Not Selected
Ioanna Mavredaki			41%			Not Selected
Elena Giannarou			15%			Not Selected
Afrodite Dimoula		18%				Not Selected
Evangelia Drakaki		13%				Not Selected
Aggeliki Spyrou	33.81%					Not Selected
Vicky Stouki	11.32%					Not Selected
Male
	3–4 March	5–6 March	7 - 8 March		9–10 March	Result
Panagiotis Grigoriadis	60%	Advanced	Advanced		36%	Official Housemate
Elias Kolios		75%	Advanced		33%	Not Selected
Xristos Koimas			53%	Advanced	31%	Not Selected
Maximos Michaelidis			25%			Not Selected
Andreas Vogiatzis			22%			Not Selected
Giannis Zisis		15%				Not Selected
Giorgos Kassimis		10%				Not Selected
Dimitris Kliafas	27%					Not Selected
Konstantino Belechas	13%					Not Selected

== Housemates ==
Name	Hometown	Day entered	Day exited	Result
Alexandros Moschos	Athens	1	116	Winner
Kostas Karatzias	Serres	1	116	Runner-up
Franzeska Mela	Athens	1	115	Evicted
Amalia Mitsou	Athens	1	101	Evicted
Giorgos Kortzis	Athens	1	87	Evicted
Panagiotis Grigoriadis	Xanthi	3	73	Evicted
Nikos Krinis	New York, USA	1	59	Evicted
Melina Kentarchou	Athens	1	52	Evicted
Zoi Siota	Athens	1	45	Evicted
Panos Sakellaropoulos	Athens	1	38	Evicted
Efi Pafitou	Thessalonica	1	31	Evicted
Klio Liapi	Samos	1	24	Evicted
Tina Evangelou	Corfu	3	17	Evicted
Sakis Tsolakis	Thessalonica	1	10	Evicted

== Nominations table ==
The first housemate in each box was nominated for two points, and the second housemate was nominated for one point.

	#1	#2	#3	#4	#5	#6	#7	#8	#9	#10	#11	Final	
	#1	#2	#3	#4	#5	#6	#7	#8	#9	#10	#11	Day 113	Day 116
Alexandros	Sakis; Franzeska	Tina; Giorgos	Zoi; Melina	Zoi; Giorgos	Panos; Giorgos	Zoi; Giorgos	? ?	? ?	? ?	? ?	? ?	No; Nominations	Winner (Day 116)
Kostas	Franzeska; Zoi	Tina; Franzeska	Melina; Zoi	Melina; Zoi	Melina; Zoi	Zoi; Melina	? ?	? ?	? ?	? ?	? ?	No; Nominations	Runner-up (Day 116)
Franzeska	Kostas; Klio	Tina; Melina	Efi; Panos	Efi; Alexandros	Panos; Nikos	Alexandros; Nikos	? ?	? ?	? ?	Giorgos ?	? ?	No; Nominations	Evicted (Day 115)
Amalia	Panos; Alexandros	Klio; Melina	Klio; Panos	Alexandros; Efi	Melina; Panos	Panigiotis; Zoi	? ?	? ?	? ?	Alexandros; Kostas	? ?	Evicted (Day 101)	
Giorgos	Sakis; Alexandros	Efi; Nikos	Klio; Efi	Efi; Alexandros	Alexandros; Nikos	Alexandros; Nikos	? ?	? ?	? ?	? ?	Evicted (Day 87)		
Panigiotis	Not in House	Franzeska; Zoi	Melina; Panos	Zoi; Franzeska	Melina; Panos	Amalia; Franzeska	? ?	? ?	? ?	Evicted (Day 73)			
Nikos	Giorgos; Panos	Melina; Panos	Giorgos; Melina	Alexandros; Panos	Kostas; Zoi	Panigiotis; Franzeska	? ?	? ?	Evicted (Day 59)				
Melina	Franzeska; Nikos	Franzeska; Nikos	Klio; Nikos	Alexandros; Nikos	Kostas; Alexandros	Alexandros; Kostas	? ?	Evicted (Day 52)					
Zoi	Panos; Amalia	Efi; Tina	Klio; Efi	Alexandros; Kostas	Alexandros; Amalia	Amalia; Alexandros	Evicted (Day 45)						
Panos	Sakis; Zoi	Efi; Nikos	Klio; Efi	Efi; Alexandros	Kostas; Franzeska	Evicted (Day 38)							
Efi	Panos; Zoi	Alexandros; Zoi	Panos; Zoi	Amalia; Franzeska	Evicted (Day 31)								
Klio	Panos; Zoi	Panos; Melina	Panos; Zoi	Evicted (Day 24)									
Tina	Not in House	Alexandros; Franzeska	Evicted (Day 17)										
Sakis	Panos; Alexandros	Evicted (Day 10)											
Up for eviction	Panos; Sakis	Efi; Franzeska; Tina	Klio; Panos	Alexandros; Efi	Kostas; Melina; Panos	Alexandros; Zoi	Alexandros; Melina; Nikos	Alexandros; Kostas; Nikos	Alexandros; Amalia; Panagiotis	Alexandros; Amalia; Giorgos	Alexandros; Amalia	Alexandros; Franzeska; Kostas	Alexandros; Kostas
Evicted	Sakis; 58% to evict	Tina; 39.65% to evict	Klio; 59% to evict	Efi; 50.63% to evict	Panos; 75.69% to evict	Zoi; 75.50% to evict	Melina; 53.03% to evict	Nikos ?% to evict	Panagiotis; 77.25% to evict	Giorgos; 74.16% to evict	Amalia; 69.14% to evict	Franzeska; 45.16% to evict	Kostas; 39.29% to win
Survived	Panos; 42% to evict	Efi; 32.74% to evict Franzeska; 27.61% to evict	Panos; 41% to evict	Alexandros; 49.37% to evict	Melina; 13.22% to evict Kostas; 11.09% to evict	Alexandros; 24.50% to evict	Nikos; 25.34% to evict Alexandros; 21.63% to evict	Alexandros ?% to evict Kostas ?% to evict	Amalia; 11.79% to evict Alexandros; 10.94% to evict	Alexandros; 14.16% to evict Amalia; 11.68% to evict	Alexandros; 30.86% to evict	Alexandros ?% to evict Kostas ?% to evict	Alexandros; 60.71% to win
