= Big Brother (Greek TV series) season 5 =

Big Brother
- Season 5
- Presented by: Roula Koromila
- No. of days: 119
- No. of housemates: 16
- Winner: Giannis Foukakis
- Runner-up: Antonis Papanikolaou

Release
- Original network: Alpha TV
- Original release: 3 October 2010 – 30 January 2011

Season chronology
- ← Previous; Season 4 Next → Season 6

Big Brother Greece 5, was the fifth season of the Greek reality television series Big Brother. The show followed sixteen contestants, known as housemates, who were isolated from the outside world for an extended period of time in a custom built House. Each week, one or more of the housemates were evicted by a public vote. The last remaining housemate, Giannis Foukakis, was declared the winner, winning a cash prize of €170,000.

The season lasted 119 days and was presented by Roula Koromila. It launched on Alpha TV on October 3, 2010, and ended on January 30, 2011. As with other Alpha TV programs, the show also aired live in Cyprus through their affiliate Sigma TV.

Alpha TV was also partner with Greece's biggest pay tv provider NOVA Greece to launch a 23-hour Big Brother channel on their satellite platform. However, the show on NOVA was cut by ESR.

== Production ==
Alpha TV announced in July 2010 that they have bought the rights to the Big Brother format and aired their own revamped version in Fall 2010. After an open call for participants, a record 6,000 submissions were received by Alpha TV.

== Housemates ==
Name	Age on entry	Hometown	Occupation	Day entered	Day exited	Status
Giannis Foukakis	20	Heraklion	Handyman & Farmer	1	119	Winner
Antonis Papanikolaou	30	Patras	Rafting guide & Instructor	1	119	Runner-up
Elias Pahis	45	Athens	Accountant	1	119	3rd Place
Evelina Paruzel	23	Poland	Model & Waitress	80	119	4th Place
Evelina Paruzel	23	Poland	Model & Waitress	1	62	Walked
Stella Pentaraki	25	Chania	Nightclub worker	1	112	Evicted
Alexis Alexopoulos	25	Athens	Engineer	72	105	Evicted
Alexis Alexopoulos	25	Athens	Engineer	1	56	Evicted
Giorgos Katsavouneris	39	Volos	Guide	1	92	Walked
Mihalis Rizos	25	Nicosia	Dancer & Songwriter	80	91	Evicted
Mihalis Rizos	25	Nicosia	Dancer & Songwriter	1	42	Evicted
Christina	25	Thessaloniki	Barwoman	35	77	Evicted
Nara da Silva	26	Brazil	Latin dancer	1	70	Evicted
Maria Sideri	28	Athens	Criminologist	28	49	Evicted
Dorreta Trigazi	46	Pyrgos	Piano teacher	1	35	Evicted
Nikoleta Karidi	22	Arta	Marketing associate	1	28	Evicted
Valentina Mantinaki	20	Chania	Nursing student	1	21	Walked
Giannis Ledakis	35	Chania	Municipal office	1	21	Evicted
Elina Mpekakou	26	Athens	Dancer	1	14	Evicted

== Nominations table ==
Each week, housemates will nominate two of their fellow housemates for eviction. Housemates who are immune from nomination will be noted as "Exempt" for the week or weeks in which they are exempt.

	Week 2	Week 3	Week 4	Week 5	Week 6	Week 7	Week 8	Week 9	Week 10	Week 11	Week 12	Week 13	Week 14	Week 15	Week 16	Week 17 Final	
Giannis F.	Nikoleta; Dorreta	Mihalis; Dorreta	Dorreta; Nikoleta	Evelina; Alexis	Nara; Alexis	Evelina; Maria	Evelina; Nara	Nara; Evelina	Christina; Nara	Elias; Stella	No nominations	Mihalis; Alexis	Evelina; Alexis	Stella; Evelina	Refused	Winner (Day 119)	
Antonis	Elina; Nikoleta	Valentina; Nikoleta	Nikoleta; Alexis	Dorreta; Elias	Elias; Nara	Nara; Maria	Nara; Elias	Elias; Nara	Nara; Christina	Christina; Elias	No nominations	Mihalis; Alexis	Alexis; Evelina	Alexis; Evelina	~~Elias~~; ~~Giannis F.~~	Runner-up (Day 119)	
Elias	Dorreta; Nikoleta	Giannis L. Valentina	Nikoleta; Dorreta	Giorgos; Dorreta	Giorgos; Stella	Maria; Giorgos	Giorgos; Alexis	Evelina; Stella	Christina; Nara	Christina; Giorgos	No nominations	Alexis; Stella	Giorgos; Alexis	Alexis; Antonis	Banned	Third Place (Day 119)	
Evelina	Giannis L. Nikoleta	Valentina; Giannis L.	Alexis; Stella	Stella; Alexis	Mihalis; Alexis	Maria; Giannis F.	Giannis F. Alexis	Giannis F. Elias	Walked (Day 62)		No nominations	Giorgos; Stella	Giorgos; Giannis F.	Stella; Antonis	~~Giannis F.~~; ~~Antonis~~	Fourth Place (Day 119)	
Stella	Elina; Elias	Elias; Nikoleta	Elias; Nikoleta	Elias; Dorreta	Elias; Mihalis	Maria; Alexis	Christina; Alexis	Evelina; Nara	Christina; Elias	Christina; Elias	No nominations	Elias (x2); Mihalis (x2)	Banned	Elias; Evelina	Refused	Evicted (Day 112)	
Alexis	Giannis L. Nikoleta	Giannis L. Valentina	Nikoleta; Dorreta	Dorreta; Giorgos	Giorgos; Giannis F.	Giorgos; Nara	Refused	Evicted (Day 56)			No nominations	Giorgos; Giannis F.	Giorgos; Giannis F.	Giannis F. Antonis	Re-evicted (Day 105)		
Giorgos	Elina; Alexis	Elias; Alexis	Alexis; Mihalis	Nominated	Mihalis; Elias	Elias; Nara	Alexis; Elias	Nara; Evelina	Christina; Nara	Christina; Elias	No nominations	Mihalis; Alexis	Alexis; Evelina	Walked (Day 92)			
Mihalis	Valentina; Dorreta	Valentina; Giannis L.	Nikoleta; Dorreta	Dorreta; Elias	Giorgos; Evelina	Evicted (Day 42)					No nominations	Giannis F. Giorgos	Re-evicted (Day 91)				
Christina	Not in house					Exempt	Giorgos; Stella	Stella; Giannis F.	Giorgos; Stella	Elias; Stella	Evicted (Day 77)						
Nara	Giannis L. Elina	Giannis L. Alexis	Alexis; Nikoleta	Elias; Stella	Giorgos; Alexis	Maria; Alexis	Giorgos; Alexis	Giorgos; Antonis	Antonis; Giannis F.	Evicted (Day 70)							
Maria	Not in house				Exempt	Evelina; Nara	Evicted (Day 49)										
Dorreta	Evelina; Alexis	Alexis; Valentina	Banned	Alexis; Elias	Evicted (Day 35)												
Nikoleta	Alexis; Evelina	Valentina; Alexis	Banned	Evicted (Day 28)													
Valentina	Alexis; Elina	Banned	Walked (Day 21)														
Giannis L.	Alexis; Elina	Banned	Evicted (Day 21)														
Elina	Giannis L. Valentina	Evicted (Day 14)															
Notes	none			1, 2	3	4	5	none	6	7	none	8, 9	10, 11	12	13, 14	none	
Captain	none								Giannis F.	Antonis	Elias	Stella	Giorgos	Alexis	Elias	none	
Up for eviction	Alexis; Elina; Nikoleta	Giannis L. Valentina	Alexis; Dorreta; Nikoleta	Dorreta; Elias; Giorgos	Alexis; Elias; Giorgos; Mihalis	Maria; Nara	Alexis; Giorgos	Evelina; Nara	Christina; Giannis F. Nara	Antonis; Christina; Elias	none	Alexis; Mihalis	Alexis; Evelina; Giorgos	Alexis; Antonis; Evelina	Giannis F. Stella	Antonis; Elias; Evelina; Giannis F.	
Walked	none	Valentina	none					Evelina	none				Giorgos	none			
Evicted	Elina; Most votes to evict	Giannis L. Most votes to evict	Nikoleta; Most votes to evict	Dorreta; Most votes to evict	Mihalis; Most votes to evict	Maria; Most votes to evict	Alexis; Most votes to evict	Eviction cancelled	Nara; Most votes to evict	Christina; Most votes to evict	No eviction	Mihalis; Most votes to evict	Eviction cancelled	Alexis; Most votes to evict	Stella; Most votes to evict	Evelina; 1.24% (out of 4)	Elias; 2.9% (out of 3)
Evicted	Elina; Most votes to evict	Giannis L. Most votes to evict	Nikoleta; Most votes to evict	Dorreta; Most votes to evict	Mihalis; Most votes to evict	Maria; Most votes to evict	Alexis; Most votes to evict	Eviction cancelled	Nara; Most votes to evict	Christina; Most votes to evict	No eviction	Mihalis; Most votes to evict	Eviction cancelled	Alexis; Most votes to evict	Stella; Most votes to evict	Antonis; 16.21% (out of 2)	Giannis F. 83.79% to win

=== Notes ===
- ^Note 1 : On Week 5, Mihalis had immunity after having won a competition. Giorgos was automatically nominated for eviction by Big Brother for refusing to nominate.
- ^Note 3 : On Week 6, Maria was immune from nominations as she was a new housemate.
- ^Note 4 : On Week 7, Christina was immune from nominations as she was a new housemate.
- ^Note 5 : On Week 8, Alexis was automatically nominated for eviction by Big Brother for refusing to nominate although he was able to be nominated by other housemates.
- ^Note 6 : On Week 10, As Giannis F. was "captain" this week, he has the right to award immunity to another housemate, but he refused, therefore, was automatically nominated.
- ^Note 7 : On Week 11, As Antonis was "captain" this week, he has the right to award immunity to another housemate, but he refused, therefore, was automatically nominated.
- ^Note 8 : On Week 13, Elias, who was the "captain" of Week 12, gave Evelina immunity from nominations this week. Stella, as she was the "captain" this week, her nomination votes counted as double.
- ^Note 10 : On Week 14, Stella was banned from nominating (broke one of the rules), but was immune from nominations as she found the lucky coin in a pie the housemates were given. As Giorgos was "captain" this week, he has the right to award immunity to another housemate, but he refused, therefore, was automatically nominated.
- ^Note 12 : On Week 15, As Alexis was "captain" this week, he has the right to award immunity to another housemate, but he refused, therefore, was automatically nominated.
- ^Note 13 : On Week 16, Giannis F. and Stella were automatically nominated for eviction by Big Brother for refusing to nominate. Elias was banned from nominating as punishment for revealing his nominations last week. However, he was elected as the "captain" for the week and gave Evelina immunity from nominations.
