= Nasos Galakteros =

Greek basketball player

Personal information
- Born: March 10, 1969 (age 57) Kavala, Kingdom of Greece
- Listed height: 6 ft 7.5 in (2.02 m)
- Listed weight: 220 lb (100 kg)

Career information
- NBA draft: 1991: undrafted
- Playing career: 1989–1999
- Position: Small forward / power forward

Career history
- 1989–1993: AEK
- 1993–1995: PAOK
- 1995–1997: Olympiacos
- 1997–1999: Aris

Career highlights
- EuroLeague champion (1997); FIBA Korać Cup champion (1994); 2× Greek League champion (1996, 1997); 3× Greek Cup winner (1995, 1997, 1998); 3× Greek League All-Star (1991, 1994 II, 1997)

Athanasios "Nasos" Galakteros (Greek: Αθανάσιος "Νάσος" Γαλακτερός; born March 10, 1969, in Kavala, Greece) is a retired Greek professional titleholder basketball player. Galakteros played professionally in the Greek Basket League as well as international tournaments.

== Professional career ==
Galakteros began his basketball career with Amyntas, and later on, he played with AEK. He was a Greek Cup finalist in 1992. In 1993, he joined PAOK, where he achieved success by winning the FIBA Korać Cup in 1994 and the Greek Cup in 1995.

In the following season, Galakteros joined Olympiacos. With Olympiacos, he won two Greek League championships (1996, 1997), one Greek Cup (1997), and the EuroLeague (1997). The highlight of his career was the 1996–97 season when he achieved the Triple Crown. In 1998, while playing with Aris, Galakteros won the Greek Cup.

== National team career ==
Galakteros was a member of the Greece men's national basketball team. He represented Greece at the 1990 FIBA World Championship, where the team finished in 6th place, and at the 1994 FIBA World Championship, where Greece finished in 4th place. In total, he appeared in 74 games with Greece's senior national team, with an average of 10.5 points per game.

== Personal life ==
Galakteros has been married three times and has two children from his first and third marriages. From his first marriage to Teta Leontaridou, he has a son named Pavlos Galakteros (born 1997). From 2000 to 2007, Galakteros was married to TV presenter Roula Koromila. In October 2008, Galakteros began dating journalist Nancy Zabetoglou. They married on August 18, 2012. In 2014, Zabetoglu gave birth to their daughter, Sophie Galakterou.
