= Big Brother (Greek TV series) season 6 =

Big Brother
- Season 6
- Presented by: Harry Varthakouris
- No. of days: 113
- No. of housemates: 21
- Winner: Anna-Maria Psycharaki
- Runner-up: Sofia Danezi
- No. of episodes: 81

Release
- Original network: Skai TV
- Original release: 29 August – 18 December 2020

Additional information
- Filming dates: 28 August – 18 December 2020

Season chronology
- ← Previous; Season 5 Next → Season 7

Big Brother Greece 6 was the sixth season of the Greek reality television series Big Brother. The show returned after a nine-year hiatus and began airing on 29 August 2020 on Skai TV and ended after 113 days on 18 December 2020, nineteen years after the first season aired. It was the first season of Big Brother to air on Skai TV. The show also simulcast live in Cyprus on Sigma TV like in the last season.

This season was originally scheduled to start on 15 March 2020. But was postponed until further notice by Skai TV due to the impact of COVID-19 pandemic in Greece.

Harry Varthakouris presented the show. Andreas Mikroutsikos was the opinionist. The winner received €100,000.

Anna-Maria Psycharaki was announced as the winner of the season, with Sofia Danezi as the runner-up.

== Production ==
In October 2019, it was announced by Endemol Shine Group that Skai TV bought the rights to air the show in 2020. After an open call for participants, a record 10,000 submissions were received by Skai TV.

=== Premiere postponed ===
Season 6 of Big Brother Greece was scheduled to begin airing on 15 March 2020, however, due to the impact of COVID-19 pandemic in Greece, on the day of the scheduled premiere day, Skai TV announced that they put housemates and employees' safety and health at the top priority, therefore temporarily postpone the premiere of the show until further notice.

=== Live show ===
In February 2020, Harry Varthakouris was announced as the host for the live shows. Andreas Mikroutsikos took part in the live shows as an opinionist. In each live show, there is a psychologist as the second opinionist. In the premiere show and the first live eviction show, the opinionist was Dimitra Zafira. Since the second live eviction show, the opinionist was Elpida Georgakopoulou.

There were one or two celebrities as the opinionist in live eviction shows. In the fifth live show, it was Grigoris Gountaras, in the sixth live show it was Giorgos Tsalikis. In the eleventh live show, they were Giorgos Papadopoulos and Natali Kakava. In the twelfth live show, they were Margie Lazarou and Vasilis Grigoropoulos. In the thirteenth live show, they were Natali Kakava and Nikos Georgiadis.

=== Broadcasting ===
The premiere show aired on Saturday 29 August 2020, but it was pre-recorded a day prior.

The highlights shows were broadcast from Mondays to Thursdays from 11:00 pm to 01:00 am. The live eviction shows were broadcast on Fridays at 09:00 pm to 01:00 am.

=== Live streaming ===
Viewers can watch 23 hours a day live from the Big Brother house, on the official website skaitv.gr. The live streaming started after the end of the second episode on Monday 31 August.

On Monday 7 September 2020, Skai TV permanently stopped the live streaming, due to the unacceptable disrespectful sexist comments about rape from housemate Antonis Alexandridis, which also caused huge controversy in the outside world. After one week, on 14 September the live streaming returned on YouTube, but after 3 weeks Skai TV reclosed the live streaming.

=== House ===
The house was located in Koropi, Attica. It's a state-of-the-art space of 700 m^{2} with a 12-meter pool. In the house, there are 56 cameras and 50 microphones installed. To make it, 20 containers with specialized technical equipment arrived from the Netherlands and worked nightly for two months with more than 400 people, 25 different garages.

== Format ==
=== Weekly task ===
Every week Big Brother put to the housemates in tasks to earn money to buy food for themselves. The housemates are doing tasks daily and if they won, they would earn 100€. If they lost, they won nothing.

=== House Captain ===
Every week, a House Captain would be chosen. The Captain is given luxuries, such as the Captain Room, it's a personal bedroom for their own. Also, the house captain is immuned for a week.

=== Power of Veto ===
The housemates are selected to compete in the Power of Veto competition. The winner of the Veto competition wins the right to either revoke the nomination of one of the nominated Housemates or leave them as is.

=== Hot seat ===
Every week in the live shows, a housemate sits in the hot seat, where this is in a room. Andreas Mikroutsikos and the viewers from social media are asking the housemate some questions.

Live Show	Housemate(s)
#1	Sofia
#2	Ramona & Rania
#3	Christina
#3	Themis
#4	Vladimiros
#5	Themis
#6	Christos M.

=== Blue Room ===
Since week 5, in the live eviction shows, a special guest goes in the house. This can be someone from the family of the housemate or in the room can go Andreas Mikroutsikos, where he speaks with the housemates for what is going on in the house.

Live Show	Housemate(s)	Guest
#5	Afroditi	Her Mother
#6	Afroditi & Sofia	Mikroutsikos
#7	Raisa	Her Mother
#7	Anna-Maria & Sofia	Mikroutsikos
#8	Anna-Maria & Raisa	Mikroutsikos
#9	Anna-Maria	Her Mother
#9	Christos V. & Panagiotis	Mikroutsikos
#10	Christos M.	Mikroutsikos
#10	Anna-Maria & Ramona	Mikroutsikos
#10	Dimitris K.	His Mother
#11	Dimitris P.	Mikroutsikos
#12	Zak	Mikroutsikos
#12	Sofia	Two Friends

=== Twin twist ===
This season of Big Brother Greece introduced a twin twist like in the fifth and seventeenth season of the American version. The twist was that a set of twins were switching spots in the house, intending to make it to the first week. Christos Varouxis' twin brother, Panagiotis Varouxis enter the house in secret at the end of the premiere. The twins, Christos V. and Panagiotis, both played as Christos V. and would switch places at various times in the Captain room. Their secret mission is that they must make the other housemates thinking that they are one person. After one week, the twist was revealed to the other housemates and then the twins played together as a single Housemate. Since Week 5, Big Brother allowed them to play individually in the game.

== Housemates ==
On the first day, eighteen housemates entered the house. After the first week, two new housemates entered the house. On week 3, a new housemate entered the house.

Name	Age on entry	Hometown	Occupation	Day entered	Day exited	Status
Anna-Maria Psycharaki	36	Crete	Lawyer	1	113	Winner
Sofia Danezi	31	Thessaloniki	Singer	1	113	Runner-up
Dimitris Pyrgidis	36	Thessaloniki	Businessman	1	113	3rd Place
Zak loannidis	30	Athens	Personal trainer	1	113	4th Place
Grigoris Tsekouras	31	Mykonos	Civil engineer	1	113	5th Place
Themis Kanellos	18	Piraeus	YouTuber	1	106	Evicted
Christos Varouxis (Note: The twins Christos V and Panagiotis entered the House on Day 1, but Panagiotis entered the Captain's Room secretly. They nominate and be nominated together.)	22	Pyrgos, Elis	Hotel worker	1	106	Evicted
Dimitris Kechagias	28	Athens	Boat subletting company	1	99	Evicted
Ramona Morosanou	37	Romania	Beauty artist and photo model	1	92	Evicted
Raisa Konti	23	Albania	Waitress	1	85	Evicted
Christos Makridis	46	Skydra	Deputy mayor	1	78	Evicted
Panagiotis Varouxis	22	Pyrgos, Elis	Tourism Business	8	64	Evicted
Christina Orfanidou	35	Thessaloniki	Professional poker player	1	57	Evicted
Afroditi Gerokonstanti	31	South Africa	Plus-sized model	1	50	Evicted
Vladimiros Nikola	22	Cyprus	Personal trainer and model	8	43	Evicted
Rania Karagianni	28	Veria	Farmer	1	36	Evicted
Nikos Zekos	26	Kilkis	Breeder	15	29	Evicted
Nikolas Papapavlou	37	Pangrati	Gay activist	1	22	Evicted
Vasiliki Hanou	53	Athens	Household	8	15	Evicted
Antonis Alexandridis	31	Crete	Bartender	1	10	Ejected
Jay Prodan	24	Bangladesh	Restaurant owner	1	8	Evicted

== Nominations table ==
Twin twist and 2-in-1 housemate, their nominations counted as one. (Week 2 - 4)

	Week 1	Week 2	Week 3	Week 4	Week 5	Week 6	Week 7	Week 8	Week 9	Week 10	Week 11	Week 12	Week 13	Week 14	Week 15	Week 16 Final		Nominations received
Anna-Maria	Sofia; Christos M.	Sofia; Afroditi	Sofia; Dimitris K.	Afroditi; Sofia	Afroditi; Christina	Themis	Zak; Dimitris K.	Raisa; Christina	Banned	Christos M. Ramona	Ramona; Ramona	Ramona; Zak	Ramona; Zak	Dimitris K. Zak	No; Nominations	Winner (Day 113)		44
Sofia	Anna-Maria; Raisa	Anna-Maria; Rania	Christos V. & Panagiotis; Ramona	Nikos; Rania	Rania; Ramona	Ramona	Ramona; Christos V.	Ramona; Panagiotis	Christos V. Panagiotis	Ramona; Christos V.	Ramona; Ramona	Ramona; Grigoris	Dimitris P. Christos V.	Themis; Themis	No; Nominations	Runner-up (Day 113)		41
Dimitris P.	Nikolas; Anna-Maria	Vasiliki; Afroditi	Nikolas; Sofia	Afroditi; Dimitris K.	Vladimiros; Grigoris	Vladimiros	Sofia; Dimitris K.	Zak; Dimitris K.	Themis; Sofia	Anna-Maria; Grigoris	Anna-Maria; Sofia	Sofia; Dimitris K.	Dimitris K. Anna-Maria	Grigoris; Grigoris	No; Nominations	Third place (Day 113)		8
Zak	Christos M. Raisa	Christos M. Rania	Christos M. Rania	Christos M. Christos M.	Christos M. Rania	Christos M.	Anna-Maria; Christina	Anna-Maria; Christos V.	Christos V. Panagiotis	Anna-Maria; Ramona	Anna-Maria; Christos M.	Anna-Maria; Ramona	Ramona; Anna-Maria	Sofia; Anna-Maria	Finalist	Fourth place (Day 113)		13
Grigoris	Christos M. Anna-Maria	Christos M. Rania	Rania; Sofia	Rania; Christos M.	Christos M. Rania	Christos M.	Christina; Panagiotis	Panagiotis; Christos V.	Christos V. Panagiotis	Ramona; Christos V.	Ramona; Ramona	Ramona; Raisa	Ramona; Dimitris P.	Dimitris P. Dimitris P.	Finalist	Fifth place (Day 113)		15
Themis	Christos M. Antonis	Christos M. Rania	Christos M. Nikos	Nikos; Rania	Rania; Christos M.	Christos M.	Anna-Maria; Christos V.	Christos V. Panagiotis	Panagiotis; Christos V.	Anna-Maria; Christos V.	Anna-Maria; Christos M.	Anna-Maria; Ramona	Anna-Maria; Christos V.	Sofia; Dimitris P.	No; Nominations	Evicted (Day 106)		5
Christos V.	Jay; Christos M.	Vasiliki; Christos M.	Sofia; Dimitris K.	Sofia; Sofia	Sofia; Raisa	Raisa	Sofia; Afroditi	Raisa; Christina	Sofia; Dimitris K.	Grigoris; Zak	Sofia; Sofia	Sofia; Dimitris K.	Dimitris K. Anna-Maria	Sofia; Grigoris	No; Nominations	Evicted (Day 106)		23
Dimitris K.	Anna-Maria; Raisa	Christos M. Anna-Maria	Anna-Maria; Christos M.	Christos M. Christos M.	Christos M. Rania	Anna-Maria; Christos M.	Christos M. Anna-Maria	Anna-Maria; Christos V.	Christos V. Panagiotis	Christos V. (x2); Anna-Maria	Anna-Maria; Christos M.	Ramona; Raisa	Christos V. Dimitris P.	Anna-Maria; Anna-Maria	Evicted (Day 99)			19
Ramona	Jay; Christos M.	Christos M. Christina	Christina; Sofia	Sofia; Christina	Sofia; Grigoris	Raisa	Sofia; Dimitris K.	Raisa; Christina	Sofia; Zak	Anna-Maria; Grigoris	Anna-Maria; Sofia	Sofia; Anna-Maria	Anna-Maria; Grigoris	Evicted (Day 92)				35
Raisa	Sofia; Ramona	Sofia; Zak	Sofia; Dimitris K.	Nikos; Rania	Ramona; Christos V.	Ramona	Ramona; Christos V.	Ramona; Christos V.	Panagiotis; Christos V.	Anna-Maria; Dimitris P.	Anna-Maria; Zak	Anna-Maria; Zak	Evicted (Day 85)					12
Christos M.	Nikolas; Afroditi	Vasiliki; Afroditi	Sofia; Nikolas	Dimitris K. Sofia	Grigoris; Vladimiros	Vladimiros	Afroditi; Dimitris K.	Zak; Dimitris K.	Dimitris K. Grigoris	Grigoris; Zak	Anna-Maria; Grigoris	Evicted (Day 78)						47
Panagiotis	Non- Housemate	Vasiliki; Christos M.	Sofia; Dimitris K.	Sofia; Sofia	Rania; Christos M.	Vladimiros	Sofia; Afroditi	Raisa; Christina	Sofia; Dimitris K.	Evicted (Day 64)								11
Christina	Nikolas; Jay	Vladimiros; Zak	Anna-Maria; Nikos	Nikos; Ramona	Ramona; Rania	Ramona	Anna-Maria; Ramona	Ramona; Christos V.	Evicted (Day 57)									10
Afroditi	Christos M. Anna-Maria	Christos M. Rania	Christos M. Rania	Rania; Rania	Rania; Christos M.	Christos M.	Anna-Maria; Christos M.	Evicted (Day 50)										12
Vladimiros	Not in House	Ramona; Anna-Maria	Christos M. Ramona	Nikos; Rania	Rania; Ramona	Christos M.	Evicted (Day 43)											7
Rania	Nikolas; Jay	Grigoris; Vasiliki	Nikolas; Sofia	Afroditi; Sofia	Grigoris; Vladimiros	Evicted (Day 36)												25
Nikos	Not in House		Nikolas; Sofia	Afroditi; Sofia	Evicted (Day 29)													8
Nikolas	Christos M. Dimitris P.	Christos M. Anna-Maria	Christos M. Nikos	Evicted (Day 22)														9
Vasiliki	Not in House	Christos M. Rania	Evicted (Day 15)															4
Antonis	Themis; Nikolas	Ejected (Day 10)																1
Jay	Christos M. Sofia	Evicted (Day 8)																4
Notes	1, 2, 3	4, 5	5	5, 6	7, 8	9, 10	none		11	12, 13	14	none		15	16	17		
House captain	Christos V.	Dimitris K.	Afroditi	Anna-Maria	Anna-Maria	Dimitris K.	Raisa	Sofia	Christos M.	Dimitris K.	Christos V.	Christos V.	Sofia	Christos V.	none			
Challenge winner	Christina; Rania	none			Dimitris K.	none									Grigoris; Zak	none		
Nominated (pre-veto)	Anna-Maria; Christos M. Nikolas	Anna-Maria; Christos M. Rania; Vasiliki	Christos M. Nikolas; Sofia	Afroditi; Nikos; Rania; Sofia	Christos M. Grigoris; Ramona; Rania	Afroditi; Anna-Maria; Christos M. Ramona; Sofia; Vladimiros	Anna-Maria; Dimitris K. Sofia	Christina; Christos V. Raisa	Anna-Maria; Christos V. Panagiotis; Sofia	Anna-Maria; Christos V. Grigoris; Ramona	Anna-Maria; Christos M. Ramona; Sofia	Anna-Maria; Ramona; Sofia	Anna-Maria; Christos V. Dimitris P. Ramona	Anna-Maria; Dimitris K. Dimitris P. Grigoris; Sofia	none			
Veto winner	Sofia	Rania	Dimitris K.	Dimitris K.	Grigoris	Anna-Maria	Zak	Panagiotis	Zak	Zak	Dimitris K.	Dimitris P.	Sofia	Christos V.	none			
Against public vote	Anna-Maria; Christos M. Jay	Anna-Maria; Christos M. Vasiliki	Christos M. Dimitris K. Nikos; Nikolas; Rania	Afroditi; Nikos; Rania	Christos M. Ramona; Rania	Afroditi; Christos M. Ramona; Sofia; Vladimiros	Afroditi; Anna-Maria; Christos V. Ramona; Sofia	Christina; Panagiotis; Raisa; Ramona	Anna-Maria; Christos V. Panagiotis; Sofia	Anna-Maria; Christos V. Ramona	Anna-Maria; Christos M. Ramona	Anna-Maria; Dimitris K. Raisa; Sofia; Zak	Anna-Maria; Dimitris P. Ramona	Anna-Maria; Dimitris K. Grigoris; Sofia	Anna-Maria; Christos V. Dimitris P. Sofia; Themis	Anna-Maria; Dimitris P. Grigoris; Sofia; Zak		
Ejected	none	Antonis	none															
Evicted	Jay; Fewest votes to save	Vasiliki; Fewest votes to save	Nikolas; Fewest votes to save	Nikos; Fewest votes to save	Rania; Fewest votes to save	Vladimiros; Fewest votes to save	Afroditi; Fewest votes to save	Christina; Fewest votes to save	Panagiotis; Fewest votes to save	Eviction cancelled	Christos M. Fewest votes to save	Raisa; Fewest votes to save	Ramona; Fewest votes to save	Dimitris K. Fewest votes to save	Christos V. Fewest votes (out of 5) to save	Grigoris; Fewest votes (out of 5)	Zak; Fewest votes (out of 4)	
Evicted	Jay; Fewest votes to save	Vasiliki; Fewest votes to save	Nikolas; Fewest votes to save	Nikos; Fewest votes to save	Rania; Fewest votes to save	Vladimiros; Fewest votes to save	Afroditi; Fewest votes to save	Christina; Fewest votes to save	Panagiotis; Fewest votes to save	Eviction cancelled	Christos M. Fewest votes to save	Raisa; Fewest votes to save	Ramona; Fewest votes to save	Dimitris K. Fewest votes to save	Christos V. Fewest votes (out of 5) to save	Dimitris P. Fewest votes (out of 3)	Sofia; Fewest votes (out of 2)	
Evicted	Jay; Fewest votes to save	Vasiliki; Fewest votes to save	Nikolas; Fewest votes to save	Nikos; Fewest votes to save	Rania; Fewest votes to save	Vladimiros; Fewest votes to save	Afroditi; Fewest votes to save	Christina; Fewest votes to save	Panagiotis; Fewest votes to save	Eviction cancelled	Christos M. Fewest votes to save	Raisa; Fewest votes to save	Ramona; Fewest votes to save	Dimitris K. Fewest votes to save	Themis; Fewest votes (out of 4) to save	Dimitris P. Fewest votes (out of 3)	Sofia; Fewest votes (out of 2)	
Evicted	Jay; Fewest votes to save	Vasiliki; Fewest votes to save	Nikolas; Fewest votes to save	Nikos; Fewest votes to save	Rania; Fewest votes to save	Vladimiros; Fewest votes to save	Afroditi; Fewest votes to save	Christina; Fewest votes to save	Panagiotis; Fewest votes to save	Eviction cancelled	Christos M. Fewest votes to save	Raisa; Fewest votes to save	Ramona; Fewest votes to save	Dimitris K. Fewest votes to save	Themis; Fewest votes (out of 4) to save	Anna-Maria; Most votes to win		

=== Notes ===
- ^Note 1: Identical twins Christos V. and Panagiotis took turns playing as a single housemate during the first week for a secret mission. They secretly switched places between living inside the house and being in the Captain's Room. Both twins pretended to be Christos V.. On the first live eviction show on Day 8, the secret was revealed to the house and Panagiotis was allowed to live inside the house under his own identity.
- ^Note 2: Christina and Rania won the immunity challenge, therefore, were safe for the week.
- ^Note 3: Sofia received the veto for choosing the bed with the number 13.
- ^Note 4: On Day 10, Antonis was ejected from the house for making unacceptable disrespectful comments about rape.
- ^Note 5: The twin brothers Christos V. and Panagiotis nominated together.
- ^Note 6: Aphrodite and Nikos were the two housemates nominated for eviction. However, it was later revealed that there would be a third person to be nominated on Friday's live show. During the live show, the housemates had to vote for a third housemate to be nominated for eviction. The housemate that received the most nominations would be the third nominee. There was a tie between Rania and Sofia, so they were both nominated. Dimitris K., who had the power of Veto, was able to save one of the four nominees. He chose to save Sofia. In the end, Aphrodite, Nikos and Rania were nominated for eviction.
- ^Note 7: On Week 5, Big Brother split Christos V. and Panagiotis, who played as one housemate, from now on they both play alone as two individual housemates.
- ^Note 8: The housemates participated in a challenge where one of the two winners would get immunity and the other the Power of Veto. Dimitris K. and Grigoris won the challenge. Dimitris K. got the immunity and Grigoris got the Power of Veto.
- ^Note 9: Afroditi and Sofia were automatically nominated as a punishment for breaking the rules. They couldn't be saved by the Power of Veto.
- ^Note 10: Big Brother gave the power to the captain, Dimitris K., to nominate one of the housemates. He nominated Anna-Maria.
- ^Note 11: Anna-Maria was automatically nominated as a punishment for breaking the rules. She couldn't nominate, couldn't be saved by the Power of Veto and couldn't compete for the Veto. She also couldn't be the House Captain for next week.
- ^Note 12: Big Brother gave Dimitris K., the captain of the week, the power for one of his votes to count as a double vote. He gave the double vote to Christos V..
- ^Note 13: On Week 10, Big Brother decided that none of the housemates would be evicted.
- ^Note 14: During the 10th live show, the housemates voted the first housemate that they wanted to be against the public vote next week.
- ^Note 15: Dimitris K. was automatically nominated as a punishment for breaking the rules. He couldn't be saved from the Power of Veto and also wasn't able to compete for the Veto.
- ^Note 16: On Week 15, there was no Captain and Veto. All housemates played 6 games in two rounds. The two winners from each round would automatically make it to the finale, and the rest would be nominated for eviction automatically. Zak won the first round and Grigoris the second.
- ^Note 17: For the final week, the public voted for the winner.

== Ratings ==
Official ratings are taken from AGB Hellas.

Week	First air date	Last air date	Timeslot (EET)	Share Household (in %)						Weekly average	Season average
Week	First air date	Last air date	Timeslot (EET)	Monday	Tuesday	Wednesday	Thursday	Friday	Saturday	Weekly average	Season average
1	29 August 2020	4 September 2020	Saturday 09:00pm–01:00am						27.8	25.2	17.8
1	29 August 2020	4 September 2020	Monday to Thursday 11:00pm–01:00am Friday 09:00pm–01:00am	25.4	24.3	23.7	22.5	27.5		25.2	17.8
2	7 September 2020	11 September 2020	Monday to Thursday 11:00pm–01:00am Friday 09:00pm–01:00am	23.7	23.0	21.0	24.7	19.1		22.3	17.8
3	14 September 2020	18 September 2020	Monday to Thursday 11:00pm–01:00am Friday 09:00pm–01:00am	17.6	19.8	18.0	17.2	15.3		17.6	17.8
4	21 September 2020	25 September 2020	Monday to Thursday 11:00pm–01:00am Friday 09:00pm–01:00am	16.0	14.9	13.9	16.0	15.0		15.2	17.8
5	28 September 2020	2 October 2020	Monday to Thursday 11:00pm–01:00am Friday 09:00pm–01:00am	15.3	18.2	14.5	16.2	14.5		15.7	17.8
6	5 October 2020	9 October 2020	Monday to Thursday 11:00pm–01:00am Friday 09:00pm–01:00am	17.9	19.0	16.8	18.6	13.8		17.2	17.8
7	12 October 2020	16 October 2020	Monday to Thursday 11:00pm–01:00am Friday 09:00pm–01:00am	17.1	21.1	18.0	18.2	18.0		18.5	17.8
8	19 October 2020	23 October 2020	Monday to Thursday 11:00pm–01:00am Friday 09:00pm–01:00am	14.5	17.2	18.6	20.4	17.5		17.6	17.8
9	26 October 2020	30 October 2020	Monday to Thursday 11:00pm–01:00am Friday 09:00pm–01:00am	20.3	18.5	21.5	20.6	16.0		19.4	17.8
10	2 November 2020	6 November 2020	Monday to Thursday 11:00pm–01:00am Friday 09:00pm–01:00am	17.8	18.5	18.2	19.7	15.7		18.0	17.8
11	9 November 2020	13 November 2020	Monday to Thursday 11:00pm–01:00am Friday 09:00pm–01:00am	17.3	16.6	19.7	20.9	17.4		18.4	17.8
12	16 November 2020	20 November 2020	Monday to Thursday 11:00pm–01:00am Friday 09:00pm–01:00am	16.5	12.4	17.8	16.6	13.8		15.4	17.8
13	23 November 2020	27 November 2020	Monday to Thursday 11:00pm–01:00am Friday 09:00pm–01:00am	16.0	14.6	17.4	17.7	16.9		16.5	17.8
14	30 November 2020	4 December 2020	Monday to Thursday 11:00pm–01:00am Friday 09:00pm–01:00am	13.2	15.9	20.3	17.6	15.7		16.5	17.8
15	7 December 2020	11 December 2020	Monday to Thursday 11:00pm–01:00am Friday 09:00pm–01:00am	17.3	15.0	16.1	15.4	16.2		16.0	17.8
16	14 December 2020	18 December 2020	Monday to Thursday 11:00pm–01:00am Friday 09:00pm–01:00am	15.6	12.7	15.0	15.2	20.4		15.8	17.8
