= Big Brother (Greek TV series) season 4 =

Big Brother
- Season 4
- Presented by: Tatiana Stefanidou
- No. of days: 88
- No. of housemates: 31
- Winner: Nikos Papadopoulos
- Runner-up: Alexandros Trjantafylljdis

Release
- Original network: ANT1
- Original release: 3 October – 29 December 2005

Season chronology
- ← Previous; Season 3 Next → Season 5

Big Brother Greece 4 also known as Big Mother, was the fourth season of the Greek reality television series Big Brother. The show followed thirty-one contestants, known as housemates, who were isolated from the outside world for an extended period of time in a custom-built house. Each week, one or more of the housemates were evicted by a public vote.

At the beginning of the season, Big Brother Greece 4 launched under the name Big Mother on ANT1 on October 3, 2005, and ended on December 29, 2005, lasted 88 days. It featured a new format and was known as "Big Mother". In Big Mother, the nine housemates take part in the game with their mothers, with whom they must coexist during the contest. The "mamas" were not able to win the prize but they would stay with their children until their eviction. When a housemate is evicted, their mother must also leave the house. However, this proved to be a failure with the show's audience and the show's name switched back to Big Brother and use the traditional format in mid-season.

Despite the switch back to the traditional format, ratings still did not meet expectations and ANT1 decided to abandon the Big Brother franchise. The last remaining housemate, Nikos Papadopoulos, was declared the winner, winning a cash prize of €200,000.

The show presented by Tatiana Stefanidou.

== Housemates ==
Housemates	Age	Birthplace/Residence	Occupation	Mother/Child	Day entered	Day exited	Status
Nikos Papadopoulos	24	Larissa	Contractor	None	30	88	Winner
Alexandros Trjantafylljdis	21	—N/a	—N/a	Mairi's son	21	88	Runner-up
Giorgos Alatzas	25	—N/a	—N/a	Katerina's son	1	88	3rd Place
Konstantinos Dominical	21	—N/a	—N/a	Kaith's son	1	88	4th Place
Anna Kartswli	24	Thessalonica	Barwoman	None	30	88	5th Place
Eva Tsakirian	32	Athens	Presenter; Writer	None	30	85	Evicted
Kostas Gkavelas	28	—N/a	—N/a	Elli's son	1	77	Evicted
Tonia Zagkogjanni	21	—N/a	—N/a	Konstantina Zagkogjanni's daughter	1	70	Evicted
Louis Alberto Valerio Lemes	32	Argentina	Student of Theology	None	30	63	Evicted
Dimitra Paxinou	30	Thessalonica	Actor	None	30	56	Evicted
Ornelia Zaha	—N/a	Romania	Schoolteacher yoga	None	30	56	Evicted
Kostis Soukos	34	Ma'ni	Free professional	None	30	49	Evicted
Konstantina Doga	29	—N/a	—N/a	Venus's daughter	21	42	Evicted
Andreas Manoysos	26	—N/a	—N/a	Terezak's son	29	35	Evicted
Andreas Manoysos	26	—N/a	—N/a	Terezak's son	1	28	Evicted
Terezak Sklavoy	45	—N/a	—N/a	Andreas' mother	1	29	Walked
Elli Diamantopoulos	46	—N/a	—N/a	Kostas' mother	1	28	Evicted
Kaith Zervoy	49	—N/a	—N/a	Konstantinos' mother	1	28	Evicted
Katerina Alatza	44	—N/a	—N/a	Giorgos' mother	1	28	Evicted
Konstantina Zagkogjanni	40	—N/a	—N/a	Tonia' mother	1	28	Evicted
Mairi Trjantafylljdi	46	—N/a	—N/a	Alexandros' mother	21	28	Evicted
Venus Tsjvjljka	69	—N/a	—N/a	Konstantina Doga' mother	21	28	Evicted
Maria Samara	39	—N/a	—N/a	Meroph' mother	14	28	Evicted
Meroph Samara	19	—N/a	—N/a	Maria Samara's daughter	14	28	Evicted
Foteinh Halvadaki	65	—N/a	—N/a	Giannis' mother	1	21	Evicted
Giannis Halvadakis	21	—N/a	—N/a	Foteinh's son	1	21	Evicted
Irene	—N/a	—N/a	—N/a	Maria' mother	1	14	Evicted
Maria	—N/a	—N/a	—N/a	Irene's daughter	1	14	Evicted
Eliana	—N/a	—N/a	—N/a	Teresa's daughter	1	8	Walked
Teresa	—N/a	—N/a	—N/a	Eliana' mother	1	8	Walked
Georgia	—N/a	—N/a	—N/a	Patritsia's mother	1	7	Evicted
Patritsia	—N/a	—N/a	—N/a	Georgia's daughter	1	7	Evicted

== Nominations table ==
	Big Mother					Big Brother										
	Week 1	Week 2	Week 3	Week 4		Week 5	Week 6	Week 7	Week 8		Week 9	Week 10	Week 11	Week 12	Week 13 Final	
	Week 1	Week 2	Week 3	Day 22	Day 28	Week 5	Week 6	Week 7	Week 8		Week 9	Week 10	Week 11	Week 12	Week 13 Final	
Nikos	Not in House						Konstantina D.	Not; Eligible	Ornelia	Ornelia	Giorgos	Konstantinos	Giorgos	Konstantinos	Winner (Day 88)	
Alexandros	Not in House			Konstantinos	Stay	Not; Eligible	Kostas	Not; Eligible	Dimitra	Ornelia	Anna	Eva	Anna	Konstantinos	Runner up (Day 88)	
Giorgos	Eliana	Tonia	Andreas	Nominated	Stay	Not; Eligible	Dimitra	Not; Eligible	Dimitra	Ornelia	Nikos	Eva; Anna	Eva	Eva	Third place (Day 88)	
Konstantinos	Tonia	Giorgos	Giannis	Andreas	Stay	Nominated	Anna	Not; Eligible	Alexandros	Nominated	Nikos	Eva	Nikos	Anna; Eva	Fourth place (Day 88)	
Anna	Not in House						Kostas	Louis	Alexandros; Dimitra	Konstantinos	Tonia	Alexandros	Konstantinos	Alexandros	Fifth place (Day 88)	
Eva	Not in House						Nikos	Kostis	Dimitra	Ornelia	Nikos	Alexandros	Anna	Anna	Evicted (Day 85)	
Kostas	Eliana	Giorgos	Nominated	Andreas	Stay	Not; Eligible	Konstantina D.	Louis	Konstantinos	Ornelia	Giorgos; Louis	Giorgos	Giorgos	Anna	Evicted (Day 77)	
Tonia	Konstantinos	Giorgos	Konstantinos	Andreas	Stay	Not; Eligible	Nikos	Not; Eligible	Anna	Ornelia	Alexandros	Alexandros	Evicted (Day 70)			
Louis	Not in House						Eva	Nominated	Ornelia	Ornelia	Giorgos	Eva	Evicted (Day 63)			
Dimitra	Not in House						Eva	Not; Eligible	Nikos	Ornelia	Evicted (Day 56)					
Ornelia	Not in House						Konstantina D. Alexandros	Not; Eligible	Konstantinos	Nominated	Evicted (Day 56)					
Kostis	Not in House						Kostas	Nominated	Evicted (Day 49)							
Konstantina D.	Not in House			Meroph	Stay	Not; Eligible	Nikos	Evicted (Day 42)								
Andreas	Tonia	Nominated	Konstantinos	Konstantinos	Leave	Nominated	Evicted (Day 35)									
Tezerak	Konstantinos	Not; Eligible	Giannis	Konstantinos	Stay	Konstantinos	Walked (Day 29)									
Elli	Maria	Konstantinos	Not; Eligible	Giorgos; Meroph	Leave	Evicted (Day 28)										
Kaith	Tonia	Maria	Andreas	Meroph	Leave	Evicted (Day 28)										
Katerina	Eliana	Tonia	Tonia	Not; Eligible	Leave	Evicted (Day 28)										
Konstantina Z.	Giorgos	Konstantinos	Konstantinos	Meroph	Leave	Evicted (Day 28)										
Mairi	Not in House			Meroph	Leave	Evicted (Day 28)										
Venus	Not in House			Tonia	Leave	Evicted (Day 28)										
Maria S.	Not in House		Konstantinos	Tonia	Evicted (Day 28)											
Meroph	Not in House		Konstantinos	Tonia	Evicted (Day 28)											
Foteinh	Patritsia	Andreas	Konstantinos	Evicted (Day 21)												
Giannis	Tonia	Maria	Konstantinos	Evicted (Day 21)												
Irene	Andreas	Tonia	Evicted (Day 14)													
Maria	Andreas	Kostas	Evicted (Day 14)													
Eliana	Konstantinos	Walked (Day 8)														
Teresa	Andreas	Walked (Day 8)														
Georgia	Not; Eligible	Evicted (Day 7)														
Patritsia	Nominated	Evicted (Day 7)														
Notes															none	
Up for eviction	Patritsia; Tonia	Andreas; Maria	Giannis; Kostos	Giorgos; Meroph	All; Housemates	Andreas; Konstantinos	Alexandros; Konstantina D.	Kostis; Louis	Alexandros; Dimitra	Konstantinos; Ornelia	Louis; Nikos	Eva; Tonia	Giorgos; Kostas	Anna; Eva	Alexandroa; Anna; Giorgos; Konstantinos; Nikos	
Walked	none	Eliana; Teresa	none			Tezerak	none									
Evicted	Patritsia & Georgia; Most votes to evict	Maria & Irene; Most votes to evict	Giannis & Foteinh; Most votes to evict	Meroph & Maria S. Most votes to evict	Andreas; Elli; Kaith; Katerina; Konstantina Z. Mairi; Venus; Pairs' choice to evict	Andreas; Most votes to evict	Konstantina D. Most votes to evict	Kostis; Most votes to evict	Dimitra; Most votes to evict	Ornelia; 8 of 9 votes to evict	Louis; Most votes to evict	Tonia; Most votes to evict	Kostas; 59% to evict	Eva; 70% to evict	Anna; 6.7% (out of 5)	Konstantinos; 7.8% (out of 4)
Evicted	Patritsia & Georgia; Most votes to evict	Maria & Irene; Most votes to evict	Giannis & Foteinh; Most votes to evict	Meroph & Maria S. Most votes to evict	Andreas; Elli; Kaith; Katerina; Konstantina Z. Mairi; Venus; Pairs' choice to evict	Andreas; Most votes to evict	Konstantina D. Most votes to evict	Kostis; Most votes to evict	Dimitra; Most votes to evict	Ornelia; 8 of 9 votes to evict	Louis; Most votes to evict	Tonia; Most votes to evict	Kostas; 59% to evict	Eva; 70% to evict	Giorgos; 20.2% (out of 3)	Alexandros; 23.1% (out of 2)
Evicted	Patritsia & Georgia; Most votes to evict	Maria & Irene; Most votes to evict	Giannis & Foteinh; Most votes to evict	Meroph & Maria S. Most votes to evict	Andreas; Elli; Kaith; Katerina; Konstantina Z. Mairi; Venus; Pairs' choice to evict	Andreas; Most votes to evict	Konstantina D. Most votes to evict	Kostis; Most votes to evict	Dimitra; Most votes to evict	Ornelia; 8 of 9 votes to evict	Louis; Most votes to evict	Tonia; Most votes to evict	Kostas; 59% to evict	Eva; 70% to evict	Nikos; 42.0% to win	

- Housemate was exempt
- Housemate was Head of household (Weeks 5 -12) or Big Mother (Weeks 1–4)
Notes:

^1 In the first four rounds of nominations before nominations took place the housemates voted for who they wanted to be Big Mother that week. The housemate voted Big Mother would, along with her child, be safe from eviction and would have to nominate one nominee each week and break nomination ties when necessary.
^2 In round one of nominations Konstantinos, Eliana & Andreas all received three nominations. As only two people could be nominated. Foteinh, as Big Mother, had to choose which of the three would be nominated for eviction. She chose Eliana.
^3 In round two of nominations Tonia & Maria received the most nomination with three each, as only one of them could join Andreas, who was already up for eviction, Big Mother Tezerak had to decide which of them would face eviction. Tezerak chose Maria to face eviction.
^4 In the third round of nominations Konstantinos received the most nominations with seven. Giannis and Andreas both received the next highest with two. As only one of them could face eviction it was up to Big Mother Katerina to choose which of them would be up for eviction along with Konstantinos. She chose Giannis.
^5 In the third round of nominations the initial nominees Kostas and Elli were asked to save one housemate from eviction, they saved Konstantinos.
^6 In the fourth round of nominations Andreas and Giannis received the same number of nominations. As Big mother it was up to Katerina to decide which of the two would be nominated for eviction, she chose Giannis.
^7 Following the fourth eviction the housemates were informed by Big brother that one member of each mother/child pair had to be evicted and that it was up to them to decide who it would be.
^8 On day 29 Tezerak decided to voluntarily leave the house. As Tezerak was voted Big mother before deciding to leave the house she still nominated a housemate for eviction.
^9 Following the voluntary exit of Tezerak from the house her son Andreas was given the opportunity to return to the house under the condition that he would automatically face eviction against Tezeraks nominee for eviction which was Konstantinos.
^10 In the sixth round of nominations Ornelia was votes HOH by the former mothers.
^11 In round sixth of nominations Konstantina D. was nominated by the housemate nominations. As Head of Household Ornelia had to choose the second person up for eviction, she chose Alexandros.
^12 In the seventh round of nominations Big brother told the housemates they were nominating like usual, however what they did not know was that instead of nominating they were really voting for Head of Household.
^13 In the seventh round of nominations Louis was automatically nominated by Ana and Kostas who were secretly living in the bedset.
^14 In the eighth round of nominations Alexandros was nominated for eviction through nominations. As Head of Household Ana nominated the other nominee Dimitra.
^15 On day 56 Big brother nominated Konstantinos and Ornelia for eviction for rule breaking. Instead of having the public vote to evict which of the two should leave Big brother had their fellow housemates vote to decide which would go.
^16 In the ninth round of nominations Nikos was nominated for eviction through nominations. As Head of Household Kostas nominated the other nominee Louis.
^17 In the eleventh round of nominations there was a tie in the HOH vote between Giorgos and Kostas. As the most recently evicted housemate it was up to Louis to decide who would be HOH, he chose Giorgos.
^18 In the eleventh round of nominations evicted housemate Louis was allowed to nominate.
^19 In the eleventh round of nominations Eva was nominated through nominations. As Head of Household it was up to Giorgos to nominate the second housemate for eviction, he nominated Tonia.
^20 In the twelfth round of nominations Big brother decided that either Eva, Kostas or Nikos would automatically be nominated for eviction and that they would have to decide which of them it would be, they chose Kostas. The other nominee was decided by recently evicted housemate Tonia after there was a tie between Anna and Giorgos following nominations, she chose to nominate Giorgos.
^21 Prior to the thirteenth round of nominations Big brother had the housemates compete in a gift opening competition in which the winner would receive immunity, Nikos was the first to find an exemption in a present and was given immunity.
^22 In the thirteenth round of nominations there was a tie in both the nomination and HOH vote, therefore it was left up to Kostas to choose between Ana and Konstantinos to nominate and Alexandros and Konstantinos for HOH. Kostas chose to make Ana the first nominee for the week and to make Konstantinos HOH.

^23 As the Head of Household it was up to Konstantinos to nominate a second nominee for eviction, he chose to nominate Eva.
