= Prodromos Kathiniotis =

Greek reality-TV celebrity and singer

Prodromos Kathiniotis (Greek: Πρόδρομος Καθηνιώτης; born 30 July 1969) is a Greek singer and reality-TV celebrity distinguished as a spontaneous, straightforward, manly and folksy personality. His fame is largely attributed to the Greek version of Big Brother. His first album, "The first game" has elements of traditional Greek music. He appeared as a panel member in a daily TV show called H Ellada Paizei ("Greece Plays" - Alter Channel) hosted by Marietta Chrousala.
