= Cerebral Palsy Greece =

Greek charitable organization

Cerebral Palsy Greece (CPG; Greek: Εταιρεία Προστασίας Σπαστικών) is a Greek nonprofit charitable organization that serves people with cerebral palsy.

Cerebral Palsy Greece was founded as the Athens Spastic Society in 1972. In 2001, thanks to a significant donation made by the Lilian Voudouri Foundation and the success of the TV-Marathon organized by Mega Channel in 1996, CPG built the Open Door Centre of Education and Rehabilitation in Argyroupolis, Greece.

CPG benefitted from the auction sale of some valuable Piaget jewellery featured in the Christie's London sale, SALE 7970 —IMPORTANT JEWELS held on 8 June 2011.

CPG currently serves about 250 people a day and has served over 3000 families.
