= Big Brother (Greek TV series) =

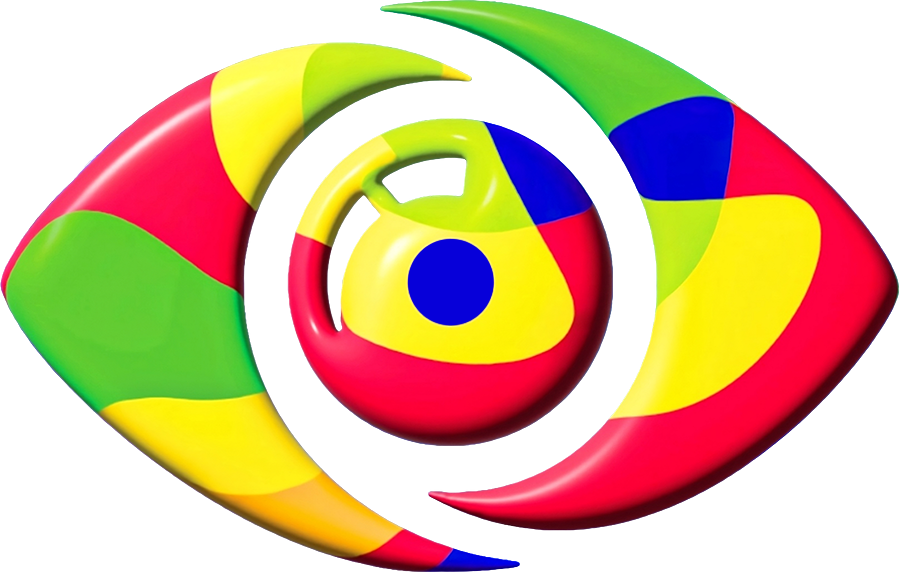
- The logo of the 8th season of Big Brother Greece.
- Also known as: The Wall (season 3); Big Mother (season 4)
- Created by: Endemol
- Based on: Big Brother by John de Mol Jr.
- Directed by: Megaklis Vintiadis (2001–2005); Periklis Vas. Asproulias (2010–2011); Panos Georgiou (2020–2021)
- Presented by: Andreas Mikroutsikos; Tatiana Stefanidou; Roula Koromila; Harry Varthakouris; Grigoris Gountaras; Natali Kakava; Petros Lagoutis
- Country of origin: Greece
- Original language: Greek
- No. of seasons: 7

Production
- Executive producers: Tanja Spiranec (2010–2011); Stefanos Kalligiannis (2020–2021)
- Editors: Giota Spanou (2001–2005); Mairi Kousoula (2010–2011)
- Production companies: Ena Productions (2001–2005); PLD Productions (2010–2011); Endemol Shine Group (2020–2021)

Original release
- Network: ANT1
- Release: 10 September 2001 – 29 December 2005
- Network: Alpha TV
- Release: 3 October 2010 – 30 January 2011
- Network: Skai TV
- Release: 29 August 2020 – 17 December 2021

Big Brother Greece is the Greek version of the international reality television franchise Big Brother created by producer John de Mol Jr. in 1999. The show premiered on 10 September 2001 on ANT1, the show followed a number of contestants, known as housemates, who are isolated from the outside world for an extended period of time in a custom-built house. Each week, one of the housemates is evicted by a public vote, with the last housemate remaining winning a cash prize.

ANT1 broadcast four seasons until 2005. During its run, ANT1 changed the name and format of the show twice, with the third season under the name The Wall and the fourth season under the name Big Mother. The show was also broadcast in Cyprus on ANT1 Cyprus during this period.

In 2010, Alpha TV announced that they would launch their own version of the original Big Brother, with the season starting on 3 October 2010 and ending on 30 January 2011. The show was also broadcast in Cyprus on Sigma TV.

In October 2019, it was announced that Big Brother would return after 9 years break in Greece, and would broadcast on Skai TV. The show also broadcast in Cyprus on Sigma TV. The revival season began airing on 29 August 2020 and ended on 18 December 2020. Audition for the seventh season started on 1 April 2021. In March 2025, it was officially announced that a new season of Big Brother Greece would return in May 2025 airing over summertime.

The announcement came as a surprise to fans, as there had been no prior indication that the show would return. According to Greek media reports, Skai TV—the broadcaster responsible for the previous two seasons—retained the rights to the show and chose to relaunch it as a cost-effective and recognizable programme to boost viewership. This decision followed a period in which the channel had shifted its focus from entertainment to news programming, a move that reportedly led to lower television ratings. Big Brother was considered a safe and popular option to reverse this trend. The upcoming season is expected to last 80 days. Actor Petros Lagoutis will host the new edition.

== Format ==
Big Brother Greece is based on the international Big Brother series produced by Endemol in the Netherlands which began in 1999. The show's name comes from George Orwell's novel Nineteen Eighty-Four (1949), which revolves around a dystopia in which dictator Big Brother is the all-seeing leader.

A group of people (called the Housemates) live together in a house, where 24 hours a day their every word and every action is recorded by cameras and microphones in all the rooms in the house. Access to television, the Internet, print media, and time is prohibited. In addition, the housemates live in complete confinement; they have no access to the outside world. At least once a week, the housemates secretly nominate two housemates they wish to face a public vote to evict. The two or more housemates with the most votes face the public vote. The viewing public decides which of them gets evicted through text message votes or phone calls. The nominee with the most votes is evicted and leaves the house.

Should their stay inside the house become difficult for them to bear, the housemate is allowed to voluntarily leave at any time during the game. In the event of a withdrawal from the house, a replacement housemate usually enters the house as the replacement.

In the final week of each season, the viewers vote for which of the remaining housemate in the house should win the prize money and be crowned the winner of Big Brother.

=== Changes of the Format ===
- In the third season known as The Wall was introduced the notion of "The Battle", where the house is separated into a luxurious area and a poor area, with two teams of housemates, constantly fighting for time in the luxurious area.
- In the fourth season known as Big Mother, the show featured a new format and was known as "Big Mother". In Big Mother, the nine housemates take part in the game with their mothers, with whom they must coexist during the contest. The "mamas" were not able to win the prize, but they would stay with their children until their eviction. When a housemate is evicted, their mother must also leave the house. However, this proved to be a failure with the show's audience and the show's name switched back to Big Brother and use the traditional format after the first month.
- In the fifth season, the housemates were recorded live 23 hours a day. They could do whatever they wanted every day from 6 am to 7 am. During this one-hour period, cameras were not recorded.

In 2020, Skai TV changed a little the format. The housemates were again recorded 24 hours a day. The viewers could also watch them from the official website of Skai TV 23 hours a day, from 12 am until 1 am the live stream was closed for one hour. However, two weeks later, the whole live stream was shut down due to the unacceptably disrespectful sexist comments about rape from housemate Antonis Alexandridis, which also caused huge controversy in the outside world. After one week, the live stream reopened only on YouTube, but three weeks later, Skai TV shut down the live stream for the second time.

Every week, a House Captain would be chosen. The Captain is given luxuries, such as the Captain Room, it's a personal bedroom for their own. Also, the House Captain is immuned for that week.

Like in the American format, a housemate can win the Power of Veto. The winner of the Veto competition wins the right to either revoke the nomination of one of the nominated housemates or leave them as is. If the winner of Veto chooses to save one housemate, then the next housemate with the most votes from the previous nomination will face the public vote with the other two (or more) housemates. The viewers decide which of them gets evicted through text message votes or phone calls. The nominee with the fewest votes is evicted and leaves the house.

In the final week, the final five housemates will face Greece's and Cyprus's vote to determine the winner.

== Seasons overview ==
Season	Originally aired			Days	Housemates	Winner	Runner-up	Prize	Presenter	Opinionist
Season	Launch date	Finale date	Network	Days	Housemates	Winner	Runner-up	Prize	Presenter	Opinionist
1	10 September 2001	31 December 2001	ANT1	113	12	Giorgos Triantafyllidis	Prodromos Kathiniotis	50,000,000 GRD	Andreas Mikroutsikos	none
2	8 March 2002	1 July 2002	ANT1	116	14	Alexandros Moskhos	Kostas Karatzias	€150,000	Andreas Mikroutsikos	none
3	10 March 2003	29 June 2003	ANT1	113	18	Thodoris Ispoglov	Patricia Lorentzo	€300,000	Andreas Mikroutsikos	none
4	2 October 2005	29 December 2005	ANT1	88	31	Nikos Papadopoulos	Alexandros Triantafyllidis	€200,000	Tatiana Stefanidou	none
5	3 October 2010	30 January 2011	Alpha TV	119	16	Giannis Foukakis	Antonis Papanikolaou	€170,000	Roula Koromila	Pavlos Stamatopoulos
6	29 August 2020	18 December 2020	Skai TV	113	21	Anna-Maria Psycharaki	Sofia Danezi	€100,000	Harry Varthakouris	Andreas Mikroutsikos
7	29 August 2021	17 December 2021	Skai TV	113	22	Nikos Taklis	Evdokia Tsagkli	€100,000	Grigoris Gountaras, Natali Kakava	Afroditi Grammeli
8	27 April 2025	27 July 2025	Skai TV	90	19	Christos Dedopoulos	Nikos Zafeirakis	€100,000	Petros Lagoutis	George Lagios

== Critical reception ==
Big Brother was criticized for the voyeuristic nature of the show, in which contestants volunteer to surrender their privacy in return for minor celebrity status and a comparatively small cash prize, has attracted much scorn. On numerous occasions, participants in the various season have become sexually involved with each other, sometimes engaging in intercourse in front of Big Brother's cameras. This recorded material is typically not broadcast due to its explicit nature, as in the British and American editions. Other editions, however, such as the German and British versions, do broadcast it. The Internet stream also captures such moments, which has led to some controversy, with certain jurisdictions such as Greece attempting to have the show removed from the airwaves.
