= Andreas Mikroutsikos =

Greek musician and television presenter

Andreas Mikroutsikos (Greek: Ανδρέας Μικρούτσικος; born 6 June 1951, Patras) is a Greek composer, lyricist, singer and TV presenter.

== Music career ==
His top hits were Hameno Nisi (Lost Island), To Koutsouraki (Little Log), Kiklopaki (Little Cyclops) and Oso Girizei i Gi (As Long As The Earth Turns Around). In 1991 Greece participated in the Eurovision Song Contest with his song Anixi sung by Sophia Vossou (Greek: Σοφία Βόσσου), finishing in 13th place. An album with the same title was released the same year.

== TV career ==
During the 1990s, Mikroutsikos presented the famous TV game show To Megalo Pazari (The Great Bazaar - Greek version of Let's Make a Deal). By moving from Mega Channel to ANT1 he was the first to introduce reality shows to the Greek public. His shows have been criticised by many, despite good TV ratings. Mikroutsikos presented the first and second series of the famous reality show Big Brother on the ANT1 channel. He also presented ANT1's music academy Fame Story.

Mikroutsikos moved to Alpha TV where he presented the reality show Apo Kardias (By My Heart). The show was banned by the Greek authorities after an episode in which a woman accused her husband of forcing her to agree to bestiality, specifically sexual acts with their dog. Mikroutsikos defended himself by saying that all the things presented through his popular show were pieces of the puzzle of our life and by closing our eyes we just ignore the problem. Mikroutsikos was nicknamed "realitaras" (reality trump).

== Personal life ==
Mikroutsikos has been married three times: to Maria Dimitriadi, trainer Foteini Georganta and TV presenter Dimitra Roubessi. He also had a long-term relationship with singer Sophia Vossou. Mikroutsikos has a son, Stergios, from his first marriage with Maria Dimitriadi. Mikroutsikos, the son of a mathematician, has a degree in mathematics himself. As a youngster, he was a member of the Revolutionary Communist Movement of Greece.

He is the younger brother of Thanos Mikroutsikos, who is also a musician/composer.

== Filmography ==
=== Television ===
Year	Title	Role(s)	Notes
1984	Graffiti	Himself	1 episode; talk show participant
1987	Radio Frequencies	Himself (host)	16 episodes
1989	12 plus 1 wishes for 1989	Himself	TV special
1991	Eurovision Song Contest 1991	Himself (contestant)	13th place
1991–1995	The Greatest Deal with Andreas Mikroutsikos	Himself (host)	Daytime game show on MEGA
1992	Eliza and all the others	Himself (voice)	Episode: "Affectionate relationships"
1992–1996	Let's Smile - It's Contagious with Andreas Mikroutsikos; Let's Smile with Andreas Mikroutsikos	Himself (host)	Daytime talk show; also, co-creator and writer
1993	Rosalia - A best seller	Himself	Episode: "A really crazy summer"
1994	The Pink Cloud	Himself	6 episodes
1996–1997	Do it or not! with Andreas Mikroutsikos	Himself (host)	Game show
1996–2000	Finally Together with Andreas Mikroutsikos	Himself (host)	Daytime tabloid talk show; also creator
1997–1998	It's your time now with Andreas Mikroutsikos	Himself (host)	Game show
1998–2000	Men ready for all with Andreas Mikroutsikos	Himself (host)	Game show
1999	Annual Pop Corn Music Awards	Herself (host)	TV special
1999	2000 wishes	Himself (host)	ANT1 TV special
2000–2001	Message received with Andreas Mikroutsikos	Himself (host)	Daytime tabloid talk show; also creator and writer
2001–2003	Big Brother Greece	Himself (host)	Reality show; season 1–3
2001–2004	The Vault with Andreas Mikroutsikos	Himself (host)	Daytime game show
2002	Morning Coffee with Andreas Mikroutsikos	Himself (host)	30 episodes
2002–2004	Fame Story	Himself (host)	Reality show; season 1–2
2003	White House	Himself	1 episode
2003	Mission	Himself (host)	Reality show; also, co-creator
2004–2005	Everything women want with Andreas Mikroutsikos	Himself (host)	Daytime game show
2004–2005	Douple Game with Andreas Mikroutsikos	Himself (host)	Weekend daytime game show
2004–2007	Dream Show	Himself (host)	Reality show; also, co-creator and writer; season 1–3
2005–2006	From Heart with Andreas Mikroutsikos	Himself (host)	Daytime tabloids talk show, also creator
2006–2007	The More Greatest Deal with Andreas Mikroutsikos	Himself (host)	Daytime game show on Alpha TV
2007–2008	We missed him! with Andreas Mikroutsikos	Himself (host)	Weekend morning talk show; also, co-creator
2007–2008	You will also sing a song	Himself (host)	Sunday variety talk show, also co-creator and writer
2009	Company with Andreas Mikroutsikos	Himself (host)	Daytime talk show; also, co-creator and writer
2014	Your Song	Himself (host)	Reality show; season 1
2020	Big Brother Greece	Himself (opinionist)	Reality show; season 6
2020	Just the 2 of Us	Himself (guest judge)	Episode 9; season 4
2021	Make Yourself Happy	Himself (opinionist)	Daytime tabloids talk show; season 3
2021–2024	Super Katerina	Himself (opinionist)	Daytime tabloids talk show; season 1–3
2024	TV Queen	Himself (opinionist)	Reality show; also, co-creator; season 1
2024–present	Buongiorno with Fay Skorda	Himself (opinionist)	Daytime talk show on MEGA
2025	News Now with Anastasia Giamali	Himself (co-host)	Episode: "March 1, 2025"
