= Sigma TV =

Commercial television network in Cyprus

Sigma TV Τηλεόραση ΣΙΓΜΑ
- Country: Cyprus
- Broadcast area: National
- Headquarters: Strovolos, Nicosia, Cyprus

Programming
- Language: Greek

Ownership
- Owner: Sigma Radio TV Public Limited
- Sister channels: Skai TV

History
- Launched: 3 April 1995

Links
- Website: Official website

Sigma TV is a commercial television network in Cyprus.

== History ==
It began broadcasting on April 3, 1995. It is geared to 18–45 year old viewers. It broadcasts a mix of original and popular foreign programming. As a general entertainment channel, its broadcast library includes children's shows, sports, news, movies, series and popular telenovelas from Latin America.

Sigma was affiliated with Alpha TV (Greece) from January 2010 to January 2016. Sigma later affiliated with Skai TV and MAD TV. It has secured rights to broadcast shows from foreign language studios.

== SigmaLive ==
SigmaLive
- Type: Web portal
- Format: Berliner
- Owner: DIAS Publishing House
- Founded: 2007
- Political alignment: Centre-Right
- Headquarters: Strovolos, Nicosia, Cyprus
- Website: www.sigmalive.com

SigmaLive is a cooperation between Sigma TV and DIAS Publishing House to publish their programming and news online. The portal is the host for the online version of the INBusiness magazine.

=== Mobile applications ===
Sigma has apps for Android, IOS, and IpadOS.
