= ANT1 (disambiguation) =

ANT1 is a Greek television network.

ANT1 may also refer to:

== Television channels ==
- ANT1 Cyprus
- ANT1 Europe
- ANT1 Pacific, in Australia
- ANT1 Satellite

== Other uses ==
- ANT1 Group, a Greek media company
- ADP/ATP translocase 1
