= Next Top Model (Greek TV series) season 2 =

Next Top Model
- Season 2

Release
- Original network: ANT1
- Original release: October 11, 2010 – February 21, 2011

Season chronology
- ← Previous; Season 1

Next Top Model, Season 2 is the second season of Next Top Model. It premiered on October 11, 2010.

The host and the panel of the judges remains the same as the first season. Greek model Vicky Kaya (Greek: Βίκυ Καγιά) assumes the role of Tyra Banks from the original series as the head of the search as well as a mentor for the contestants. The panel consists of the former model Jenny Balatsinou, fashion designer Christoforos Kontentos and noted photographer Charis Christopoulos.

The final episode aired on February 21, 2011. The winner was 17-year-old Cindy Toli from Athens, Greece. Her prizes included an all-expenses paid trip to Milan and a contract with MP Management, a cover and spread with Madame Figaro magazine, an all-expenses paid trip to New York City and representation by Maybelline New York, a contract with BSB clothing line and a Chevrolet Spark.

The international destinations for this season were Paris, France and Istanbul, Turkey.

== Cast ==
=== Contestants ===
(Ages stated are at start of contest)

Name	Age	Height	Hometown	Finish	Place
Maria Markatsyan	21	1.74 m (5 ft 8 1/2 in)	Athens	Episode 1	20
Elektra Tsela	22	1.72 m (5 ft 7 1/2 in)	Ioannina	Episode 2	19
Roubini Agapitou	22	1.73 m (5 ft 8 in)	Athens	Episode 3	18
Agni Panagiotatou	18	1.72 m (5 ft 7 1/2 in)	Athens	Episode 4	17
Kelly Vourtsi	19	1.75 m (5 ft 9 in)	Serres	Episode 5	16 (quit)
Aliki Karpodini	21	1.79 m (5 ft 10 1/2 in)	Athens	Episode 5	15 (quit)
Marina Klitsa	22	1.74 m (5 ft 8 1/2 in)	Athens	Episode 5	14
Laura-Ann Markopoulioti	18	1.76 m (5 ft 9 1/2 in)	Athens	Episode 6	13
Fenia Dimopoulou	21	1.70 m (5 ft 7 in)	Athens	Episode 7	12
Emily Nicolaidou	21	1.76 m (5 ft 9 1/2 in)	Nicosia, Cyprus	Episode 8	11
Stefania Papagianni	22	1.67 m (5 ft 5 1/2 in)	Crete	Episode 9	10
Jian Nan Peng	22	1.70 m (5 ft 7 in)	Athens	Episode 10	9
Irene Aligizaki	19	1.80 m (5 ft 11 in)	Crete	Episode 12	8
Nancy Papastavrou	23	1.76 m (5 ft 9 1/2 in)	Thessaloniki	Episode 13	7
Georgia Antoniou	18	1.82 m (5 ft 11 1/2 in)	Limassol, Cyprus	Episode 15	6
Jessica Anthi	22	1.76 m (5 ft 9 1/2 in)	Corfu	Episode 16	5 (quit)
Ioanna Papagianni	18	1.73 m (5 ft 8 in)	Athens	Episode 18	4
Elena Papadopoulou	21	1.78 m (5 ft 10 in)	Thessaloniki	Episode 18	3
Evangelia Koutalidou	20	1.80 m (5 ft 11 in)	Thessaloniki	Episode 18	2
Ana Cindorella 'Cindy' Toli	17	1.74 m (5 ft 8 1/2 in)	Athens	Episode 18	1

=== Judges ===
- Vicky Kaya
- Jenny Balatsinou
- Christoforos Kontentos
- Charis Christopoulos

=== Other cast members ===
- Tassos Sofroniou - photo shoot director

== Episodes ==
=== Episode 1 ===
First aired October 11, 2010

The next day after the Bootcamp, the 25 Models were photographed by Harry Christopoulos and Tassos Sofroniou in the streets of Mykonos. After the shooting the girls returned to Athens and waited anxiously for the meeting with the judges who would decide which 20 girls will begin their attempt to become the Next Top Model.

Back in Athens, the 20 models had to pose for the photographer Takis Diamantopoulos on the brink of the 20th floor of the President Hotel. Agni and Evangelia revealed to Tassos that they are afraid of heights and therefore the photo shoot was even more difficult for them. When the girls returned home they found their books with the best shots from the photo shoot. Maria’s book, however, was not there and so she left the house.

- Eliminated outside of judging panel: Maria Markarian
- Featured photographers: Charis Christopoulos, Tassos Sofroniou, Takis Diamantopoulos

=== Episode 2 ===
First aired October 18, 2010

In this week’s photo shoot the girls had to pose in pairs of two in front of a damaged car. The concept was that the girls were fighting with each other about whose fault it was that they were stuck in the middle of nowhere. The girls at the beginning were reluctant to raise tons. Vicky took action impressed everybody with how convincingly she shouted and allegedly started fighting with them to show them how to play the role. The girls though were only 19, so one of them did not have a pair for the photo shoot. Vicky announced to everybody that Ioanna’s pair would be Monika, the runner up of the first Next Top Model.

- Best photo: Elena Papadopoulou & Evangelia Koutalidou
- Bottom two: Elektra Tsela & Kelly Vourtsi
- Eliminated: Elektra Tsela
- Featured photographer: Thanassis Krikis

=== Episode 3 ===
First aired November 1, 2010

For this week's photo shoot the girls went to the zoo and had to pose with different animals like snakes or an eagle. The first one to react of course was Nancy. After a melt-down and almost a faint, she convinced Tassos to change her partner, so she posed with an eagle and had only 5 shots. Even though Nancy did horribly, Roubini was eliminated.

- Best photo: Jessica Anthi
- Bottom two: Nancy Papastavrou & Roubini Agapitou
- Eliminated: Roubini Agapitou
- Featured photographer: Thodoris Psiachos

=== Episode 4 ===
First aired November 8, 2010

For this week’s photo shoot the girls had to pose in swimsuits and into the arms of Greek actor Dimitris Vlachos. And while everyone thought that it would be more difficult for Nancy to do the photo shoot, Georgia struggled perhaps more on the set with Dimitris Vlachos, since he is her favorite actor. All the girls felt a little uncomfortable in the beginning but Vicky stimulated them by posing herself with Dimitris to show them how to do it right.

- Best photo: Cindorella 'Cindy' Toli
- Bottom three: Agni Panagiotatou, Fenia Dimopoulou & Laura-Ann Markopoulioti
- Eliminated: Agni Panagiotatou
- Featured photographer: Giorgos Lekakis

=== Episode 5 ===
First aired November 15, 2010

For this week’s photo shoot the models had a difficult task. They had to be photographed naked using only balloons to cover parts of their bodies. Naturally the first to react negatively to the concept was Nancy. However, it was not only Nancy who didn’t feel good for this photo shoot. Almost all the girls were hesitant in the beginning. Georgia was uncomfortable in the beginning but once she was on the set she loosened up and had more fun than any of the other girls.

- Quit: Kelly Vourtsi
- Best photo: Ioanna Papagianni
- Quit: Aliki Karpodini
- Bottom three: Emily Nicolaidou, Laura-Ann Markopoulioti & Marina Klitsa
- Eliminated: Marina Klitsa
- Featured photographer: Tassos Sofroniou

=== Episode 6 ===
First aired November 22, 2010

The girls had to pose with different animals like a spider, worms or even a small crocodile as part of a perfume ad. Emily had her last chance to prove herself to the judges. It was a big shock when Nancy didn't react at all and took everything in.

- Best photo: Emily Nicolaidou
- Bottom two: Jian Nan Peng & Laura-Ann Markopoulioti
- Eliminated: Laura-Ann Markopoulioti
- Featured photographer: Pantelis Zervos

=== Episode 7 ===
First aired November 29, 2010

For this week's photo shoot the girls had to act like they were young again and try to imitate one of their baby photos (that their parents had given in but the girls didn't know that at that time). During the photo shoot their parents showed and gave courage to the girls to continue trying. Elena was emotionally overwhelmed so it distracted her from doing well. At the judging panel the judges tested their runway skills but the girls didn't do so well. The one to be eliminated was Fenia as her photo was horrible and her runway walk was even worse.

- Best photo: Jessica Anthi
- Bottom two: Fenia Dimopoulou & Ioanna Papagianni
- Eliminated: Fenia Dimopoulou
- Featured photographer: Iwanna Tzetzoymi

=== Episode 8 ===
First aired December 6, 2010

For this week's photo shoot the girls were taken to a car cemetery. The girls had to pose with the cars and act like they were angry and mad at everyone. At the judging panel the one that was eliminated was Emily as her photo was not worthy and her runway walk was not good.

- Best photo: Cindorella 'Cindy' Toli
- Bottom two: Emily Nicolaidou & Jian Nan Peng
- Eliminated: Emily Nicolaidou
- Featured photographer: Charlie Makos

=== Episode 9 ===
First aired December 13, 2010

The models need to embody some of the popular Hollywood Icons

Model	Hollywood Icon
Cindy	Nicole Kidman
Elena	Elizabeth Taylor
Evangelia	Rita Hayworth
Georgia	Sharon Stone
Ioanna	Bridgette Bardot
Irene	Marilyn Monroe
Jessica	Cate Blanchett
Jian Nan	Michelle Yeoh
Nancy	Angelina Jolie
Stefania	Julia Roberts

- Best photo: Ioanna Papagianni
- Bottom two: Elena Papadopoulou & Stefania Papagianni
- Eliminated: Stefania Papagianni
- Featured photographer: James KalaΪtakis

=== Episode 10 ===
First aired December 20, 2010

For this week, the girls did a photo-shoot while being coated with candy.

- Best photo: Georgia Antoniou
- Bottom two: Cindorella 'Cindy' Toli & Jian Nan Peng
- Eliminated: Jian Nan Peng
- Featured photographer: Thomas Chrisochoidis

=== Clip Show ===
First aired December 27, 2010

This is the recap episode.

=== Episode 12 ===
First aired January 10, 2011

For this week, the theme of the photo shoot was Underground Club Rockers, where the girls posed as them and also with other male models/their fellow competitors.

- Best photo: Nancy Papastavrou
- Bottom two: Cindorella 'Cindy' Toli & Irene Aligizaki
- Eliminated: Irene Aligizaki
- Featured photographer: Konstantinos Rigos

=== Episode 13 ===
First aired January 17, 2011

- Best photo: Cindorella 'Cindy' Toli
- Bottom two: Elena Papadopoulou & Nancy Papastavrou
- Eliminated: Nancy Papastavrou

=== Episode 14 ===
First aired January 24, 2011

- Best photo: Cindorella 'Cindy' Toli
- Bottom two: Elena Papadopoulou & Evangelia Koutalidou
- Eliminated: None

=== Episode 15 ===
First aired January 31, 2011

- Best photo: Ioanna Papagianni
- Bottom two: Georgia Antoniou & Jessica Anthi
- Eliminated: Georgia Antoniou

=== Episode 16 ===
First aired February 7, 2011

- Best photo: Elena Papadopoulou
- Bottom two: Evangelia Koutalidou & Jessica Anthi
- Quit: Jessica Anthi

=== Episode 17 ===
First aired February 14, 2011

- Eliminated: None

=== Episode 18 ===
First aired February 21, 2011

In the final week, the girls traveled to Istanbul to do some castings and a photo shoot. After the girls arrived, they headed to explore the city. Later, they met Tasos with a famous Turkish TV presenter and producer, Acun Ilıcalı. One of the girls would have the opportunity to be the co-host in his show. They were interviewed by Acun and also the managers of the channel Show TV. The winner was Elena. After this the girls went shopping in the market of Istanbul. The next day they met again Tasos and informed them that Cindy and Ioanna would have a casting in Turkish Marie Claire for an editorial they are doing, in which Cindy won. Elena and Evangelia would have had a casting for a famous Turkish designer, but it was cancelled. Before their photo shoot, the girls went to the hotel's spa to relax. At their photo shoot they met Vicky, and they posed as fairies inspired by One Thousand and One Nights. The next day the girls returned from Istanbul. Later they met Vicky and had a challenge, in which they had to present a product of NIVEA. The winner was Elena and won NIVEA products for one year. The other day, they went to their final photo shoot inspired by Annie Leibovitz Fairy tale and posed as Couture Women along with two children. Later, they were invited to dinner by Vicky where she advised and guided the girls for the last time before their final performance. The girls arrived where the fashion show for Christoforos Kontentos would take place. All of the girls impressed with their walk, even though Ioanna's heel broke and Cindy's belt came off during the runway.

At the final judging, all of the girls were praised for their performance at the photo shoots and runway show. After the first deliberation, two girls would be eliminated immediately. The first girl to be eliminated, despite her stunning photos, was Ioanna because of her lack of height and her not so strong performance in the runway show. The second girl to be eliminated, despite her very strong performance in the runway show, was Elena because of her lack of confidence and inability to transceive her personality into her photos, as well as her average performance in the entire competition.

- Eliminated: Elena Papadopoulou & Ioanna Papagianni

As a result, Cindy and Evangelia made to the final two leading to two emotional eliminations. Cindy was praised for her photo shoots and runway show and was told that even though she was young she had a very strong performance in the entire competition. However, she was criticized for being too posey which didn't let her show her real age and mood. Evangelia was praised for her photo shoots, runway show, strong eyes and good personality. However, the judges were worried that she would have a limited number of job offers and some people will love her and others will reject her. During the final deliberation, the judges were divided over their preference of the girls. After a long wait, the girls were called back and Vicky announced Cindy as the second winner of The Next Top Model.

- Final two: Cindorella 'Cindy' Toli & Evangelia Koutalidou
- Greece's Next Top Model: Cindorella 'Cindy' Toli
- Featured photographer: Giannis Bournias, Dimitris Skoulos
- Guest judge: Andrea Losavio (booking director of MP Management)

== Results ==
Order	Episodes															
Order	1 (Note: In Episode 1, Maria was eliminated outside of judging panel for having the worst performance at the photoshoot.)	2 (Note: In Episode 2, Ioanna and Nancy's call-outs were not shown due to a possible editing mistake.)	3	4	5 (Note: In Episode 5, Aliki quit after her name was called. Kelly quit before judging took place.)	6	7	8	9	10	12	13	14	15	16 (Note: In Episode 16, Jessica landed in the bottom two and quit. Vicky revealed that she would have been eliminated regardless of her decision to quit.)	18
1	Evangelia	Evangelia	Aliki	Aliki	Irene	Ioanna	Evangelia	Cindy	Jessica	Georgia	Ioanna	Cindy	Cindy	Ioanna	Ioanna	Cindy
2	Ioanna	Elena	Evangelia	Jian Nan	Jessica	Evangelia	Jessica	Elena	Evangelia	Jessica	Nancy	Georgia	Jessica	Cindy	Cindy	Evangelia
3	Marina	Aliki	Jessica	Cindy	Evangelia	Stefania	Irene	Stefania	Jian Nan	Ioanna	Evangelia	Jessica	Ioanna	Evangelia	Elena	Elena
4	Cindy	Marina	Laura-Ann	Elena	Georgia	Emily	Cindy	Evangelia	Ioanna	Evangelia	Jessica	Evangelia	Georgia	Elena	Evangelia	Ioanna
5	Jian Nan	Jian Nan	Cindy	Stefania	Ioanna	Nancy	Emily	Georgia	Cindy	Irene	Georgia	Ioanna	Elena; Evangelia	Jessica	Jessica	
6	Aliki	Cindy	Ioanna	Evangelia	Cindy	Cindy	Stefania	Nancy	Irene	Elena	Elena	Elena	Elena; Evangelia	Georgia		
7	Maria	Jessica	Jian Nan	Marina	Elena	Jessica	Georgia	Jessica	Nancy	Nancy	Cindy	Nancy				
8	Fenia	Roubini	Marina	Jessica	Jian Nan	Elena	Jian Nan	Irene	Georgia	Cindy	Irene					
9	Agni	Irene	Emily	Emily	Nancy	Fenia	Elena	Ioanna	Elena	Jian Nan						
10	Irene	Stefania	Irene	Kelly	Aliki	Irene	Nancy	Jian Nan	Stefania							
11	Nancy	Ioanna	Agni	Georgia	Stefania	Georgia	Ioanna	Emily								
12	Elena	Nancy	Elena	Irene	Fenia	Jian Nan	Fenia									
13	Emily	Georgia	Fenia	Ioanna	Laura-Ann	Laura-Ann										
14	Roubini	Emily	Kelly	Nancy	Emily											
15	Laura-Ann	Agni	Stefania	Laura-Ann	Marina											
16	Elektra	Fenia	Georgia	Fenia	Kelly											
17	Jessica	Laura-Ann	Nancy	Agni												
18	Georgia	Kelly	Roubini													
19	Stefania	Elektra														
20	Kelly															

The contestant was eliminated outside of judging panel
The contestant was part of a collective call-out with another contestant
The contestant was eliminated
The contestant quit the competition
The contestant was part of a non-elimination bottom two
The contestant won the competition

=== Bottom two ===
Episode	Contestants	Eliminated
1	None	Maria
2	Kelly & Elektra	Elektra
3	Nancy & Roubini	Roubini
4	Agni & Fenia	Agni
5	Emily & Marina	Kelly
5	Emily & Marina	Aliki
5	Emily & Marina	Marina
6	Jian Nan & Laura-Ann	Laura-Ann
7	Ioanna & Fenia	Fenia
8	Emily & Jian Nan	Emily
9	Elena & Stefania	Stefania
10	Cindy & Jian Nan	Jian Nan
12	Cindy & Irene	Irene
13	Elena & Nancy	Nancy
14	Elena & Evangelia	None
15	Georgia & Jessica	Georgia
16	Evangelia & Jessica	Jessica
18	Cindy, Elena, Evangelia & Ioanna	Ioanna
18	Cindy, Elena, Evangelia & Ioanna	Elena
18	Cindy, Elena, Evangelia & Ioanna	Evangelia

The contestant was eliminated after her first time in the bottom two
The contestant was eliminated after her second time in the bottom two
The contestant was eliminated after her third time in the bottom two
The contestant was eliminated outside of judging panel
The contestant was eliminated in the final judging and placed fourth
The contestant was eliminated in the final judging and placed third
The contestant was eliminated in the final judging and placed as the runner-up

=== Average call-out order ===
Episode 1 & Episode 18 are not included.

Rank by average	Place	Model	Call-out total	Number of call-outs	Call-out average
1	2	Evangelia	44	14	3.14
2	15	Aliki	15	4	3.75
3	1	Cindy	57	14	4.07
4	5	Jessica	58	14	4.14
5	4	Ioanna	74	14	5.29
6	3	Elena	83	14	5.92
7	9	Jian Nan	64	9	7.11
8	6	Georgia	93	13	7.15
9	8	Irene	72	10	7.20
10	10	Stefania	63	8	7.88
11	14	Marina	34	4	8.50
12	7	Nancy	96	11	8.73
13	11	Emily	66	7	9.43
14	13	Laura-Ann	62	5	12.40
15-16	12	Fenia	78	6	13.00
15-16	18	Roubini	26	2	13.00
17	16	Kelly	42	3	14.00
18	17	Agni	43	3	14.33
19	19	Elektra	19	1	19.00
20	20	Maria	—	—	—

== Photo shoots ==
- Episode 1 photo shoots: Mykonos island; posing with gowns on a rooftop
- Episode 2 photo shoot: Broken cadillac in pairs
- Episode 3 photo shoot: Pin-up girls posing with animals
- Episode 4 photo shoot: Posing with a male model on the beach
- Episode 5 photo shoot: Posing nude with silver balloons
- Episode 6 photo shoot: Perfume ad with lizards, scorpions, and tarantulas
- Episode 7 photo shoot: Re-enacting baby photos
- Episode 8 photo shoot: B&W in a junk yard
- Episode 9 photo shoot: Hollywood icon impersonations
- Episode 10 photo shoot: Coated in candy
- Episode 12 photo shoot: Studio 54
- Episode 13 photo shoot: Iconic fashion women
- Episode 14 photo shoot: Posing inside a cube
- Episode 15 photo shoot: Tuileries Garden wearing Jean Paul Gaultier designs
- Episode 16 photo shoots: Runway shots; eyes above water; walking down Athens
- Episode 17 photo shoots: B&W crying beauty shots; jumping with a male model; high fashion aliens in nature
- Episode 18 photo shoots: One Thousand and One Nights; Annie Leibovitz fairy tale inspired shoot
