= Next Top Model (Greek TV series) =

- Also known as: Next Top Model
- Genre: Reality television
- Created by: Tyra Banks
- Presented by: Vicky Kaya
- Judges: Vicky Kaya; Jenny Balatsinou; Christoforos Kotentos; Haris Christopoulos
- Theme music composer: The xx
- Opening theme: "Intro", The xx
- Ending theme: "Intro", The xx
- Country of origin: Greece
- No. of seasons: 2
- No. of episodes: 36

Production
- Executive producer: Eugene Katravas
- Running time: 120 minutes (90 without commercials)

Original release
- Network: ANT1
- Release: 12 October 2009 – 21 February 2011

Next Top Model is a Greek reality television series. Greek model Vicky Kaya assumed the role of Tyra Banks from the original series as the head of the search as well as a mentor for the contestants for the first two seasons and from season three all four judges are the head of the search for the contestants. The basic premise of the series is a group of young contestants who live together in a house for several weeks while taking part in various challenges, photo shoots and meetings with members of the modeling industry. Normally, one poor-performing contestant is eliminated each week until the last contestant remaining is declared "Next Top Model" and receives a modeling contract along with other associated prizes.

The first season premiered on ANT1 on October 12, 2009 and concluded after two seasons on February 21, 2011. During that time, ANT1 decided not to greenlight a third season.

== Show format ==
Next Top Model contained approximately eighteen episodes and started with eighteen (first season) or twenty (second season) contestants. At the end of most episodes, one contestant was eliminated. In rare cases, a double elimination or no elimination was given by consensus of the judging panel. Makeovers were administered to contestants early in the season (usually after the first or second elimination in the finals) and a trip to one or more international destinations was scheduled nearer the end of the season when a few girls remained in the competition.

Each episode of Next Top Model covered the events of roughly a week of real time and featured a fashion challenge, photo shoot, a critique of each contestant and her performance by the judging panel led by Vicky Kaya, and the elimination of one or more contestants. The panel included the former model Jenny Balatsinou, fashion designer Christoforos Kotentos and noted photographer Charis Christopoulos. Each episode was usually associated with a theme in the world of modelling the girls need to excel in to become a successful fashion model.

An episode usually began with the contestants receiving training in an area concurrent with the week's theme. For example, contestants were coached in runway walking, posing or applying make-up to suit various occasions. A related challenge soon followed and a winner was chosen by a judge. She received some sort of prize and was usually allowed to share the benefits with a certain number of other contestants of her choice.

The next segment was a photo shoot, and each contestant's performance reflected heavily on her judging for that week. It featured photo shoots such as bikini shots, beauty shots and posing in extreme circumstances.

The final segment of each episode was judging. A panel of judges fronted by the host and a number of fashion "experts" assessed task performance and potential. Each contestant's photo was then shown and evaluated by the judging panel. After all photos were evaluated, the contestants left the room as the judges deliberated. The elimination process was ceremonious, as one by one the host revealed and handed out photos to the contestants that were not eliminated, in order of merit, occasionally saying something along the lines of, "Congratulations. You are still in the running to becoming the "Next Top Model". The last two contestants standing were brought up as the "bottom two", and the host critiqued each one before revealing which of the two was eliminated.

== Judges and other staff members ==
Cast	Seasons	
Cast	1 (2009–10)	2 (2010–11)
Hosts
Vicky Kaya	Main	Main
Judging panelists
Vicky Kaya	Main	Main
Jenny Balatsinou	Main	Main
Haris Christopoulos	Main	Main
Christoforos Kotentos	Main	Main
Art director
Tassos Sofroniou	Main	Main
Mentor
Tassos Sofroniou	Main	Main

== Seasons ==
Season	Premiere date	Winner	Runner-up	Other contestants in order of elimination	Number of contestants	International Destination(s)
1	12 October 2009	Seraina Kazamia	Monika Kwiecien	Zoe Tranoudaki, Vaso Vilegas, Nina Kalogeropoulou-Knezevic (quit), Katia Marinaki, Danae Georganda, Marsida Devole, Anthi Tsompanidou (quit), Areti Stathopoulou, Denia Agalianou, Ramona Koseleva (quit), Christina Pantelidi, Nayla Gougni, Athina Mourkoussi, Dimitra Alexandraki, Maria Iltsevich & Ioanna Dedi	18	Milan; London
2	11 October 2010	Cindy Toli	Evangelia Koutalidou	Maria Markatsian, Elektra Tsela, Roubini Agapitou, Agni Panagiotatou, Kelly Vourtsi (quit), Aliki Karpodini (quit) & Marina Klitsa, Laura-Ann Markopoulioti, Fenia Dimopoulou, Emily Nicolaidou, Stefania Papagianni, Jian Nan Peng, Irene Aligizaki, Nancy Papastavrou, Georgia Antoniou, Jessica Anthi (quit), Ioanna Papagianni, Elena Papadopoulou	20	Paris; Nice; Istanbul
