= Radio Arvyla =

- Genre: Live panel show
- Created by: Antonis Kanakis
- Directed by: Antonis Kanakis
- Presented by: Antonis Kanakis; Giannis Servetas; Christos Kiousis; Stathis Panagiotopoulos (until 10 December 2021)
- Opening theme: "Sugar Baby Love" by The Rubettes
- Country of origin: Greece
- Original language: Greek
- No. of seasons: 19

Production
- Production location: Thessaloniki
- Running time: 90 minutes

Original release
- Network: Mega Channel (2026-present); ANT1 (2008-2018, 2021-2026); Skai TV (2019); YouTube (2020); Open (2021)
- Release: 14 April 2008 – 1 April 2026

Related
- A.M.A.N.

Radio Arvyla (Greek: Ράδιο Αρβύλα) is a Greek live panel show, filmed in Thessaloniki and airing on ANT1. It first aired in April 2008. It is hosted by Antonis Kanakis, Giannis Servetas and Christos Kiousis. This live show focuses primarily on the sociopolitical issues affecting Greece, especially with regards to the long-term fiscal crisis via the use of political commentary and various forms of makeshift parodies, montage and satire.

As of 2021–2022 season, it airs everyday from 20:00 to 21:00, although it used to air from 18.00 to 19.00 during the 2007-2008 and 2008–2009 seasons. The first episode of season 4 aired on 11 October 2010. All episodes from Season 3 and on are available online on the official website of ANT1. After ANT1, the show continued to Skai. For one year (2020) it was not aired in any channel at Greek TV, so some episodes were aired on YouTube. In early 2020 it was aired on OPEN and for the season 2021–2022 on ANT1. Stathis Panagiotopoulos was removed from the show in December 2021.

== Format ==
The show used to begin with the segment "The bad joke of the day," where Stathis Panagiotopoulos tells a joke that is considered "cold". Afterwards, the "Top of the week" ("Top επικαιρότητας") segment begins, where videos from various events that occurred are shown, categorized into (usually 25) numbers (which a few of them tend to get skipped due the limited antenna time or too much laugh which are presented on the next show), for which there are satirical videos (comic skits, parodies etc.) that make fun of the original videos that were presented earlier. At the end of every episode, there is live music from (usually) new and up-and-coming bands. Internationally famous acts have also appeared, like The Zombies and Tim Booth.

Until the 6th season, Evgenia Samara or Christina Moustaka would be presenting funny videos found online or created by fans of the show, after the end of "Top of the week".

Starting with the 7th season, in which only one episode was airing per week, sketches have been incorporated into the format of the show. Besides the hosts, Kostas, the floor manager, and Stathis, a cameraman, make usual appearances in those sketches. Kostas (referred to as Kostakis) and Stathis (referred to as Pasoktsis) have been a part of some of the show's inside jokes for a while.

An invaluable and much loved member of the group was Sardela, Stathis' dog. She would come along to every taping and could be seen walking around the set. She died after the end of season 8. The hosts paid tribute to her on the first episode of season 9.

== Episodes ==
Season	Episodes	Originally aired		TV network
Season	Episodes	First aired	Last aired	TV network
1	54	14 April 2008	27 June 2008	ANT1
2	45	6 October 2008	10 June 2009	ANT1
3	141	5 October 2009	3 June 2010	ANT1
4	96	11 October 2010	1 June 2011	ANT1
5	90	24 October 2011	30 May 2012	ANT1
6	65	29 October 2012	4 June 2013	ANT1
7	26	11 November 2013	2 June 2014	ANT1
8	24	17 November 2014	8 June 2015	ANT1
9	24	23 November 2015	6 June 2016	ANT1
10	15	21 November 2016	5 June 2017	ANT1
11	22	27 November 2017	4 June 2018	ANT1
12	16	4 February 2019	27 May 2019	Skai TV
13	8	16 March 2020	11 May 2020	YouTube
14	93	11 January 2021	27 May 2021	Open TV
15	78	8 November 2021	14 April 2022	ANT1
16	65	17 October 2022	6 April 2023	ANT1
17	61	6 November 2023	22 April 2024	ANT1
18	39	11 November 2024	9 April 2025	ANT1
19	49	3 November 2025	1 April 2026	ANT1

== Reception ==
A lot of "conservatives" like Kostas Prekas have criticised the show for "crossing the line", stating that "...they are making fun of everybody, they are pricks. This show must end.". The hosts have largely not paid attention to such statements, opting instead to make fun of them through their videos.

The show still remains one of the most popular shows on Greek television, especially among younger audiences.

== Etymology ==
"Radio arvyla" is a Greek idiom that means "false rumor" or fake "news". Literally it means "army-boot radio".
