= Fila ton vatracho sou =

- Genre: Comedy; Romance
- Written by: Rena Rigga; Panos Exarchos
- Directed by: Panos Koutras
- Starring: Thodoris Atheridis; Smaragda Karydi; Isabella Kogevina; Giannis Zouganelis; Ntinos Karydis
- Country of origin: Greece
- Original language: Greek
- No. of seasons: 2
- No. of episodes: 58

Production
- Executive producer: Noir Productions Α.Ε.
- Production locations: Athens, Greece
- Running time: 42-47 minutes

Original release
- Network: ANT1
- Release: October 1, 2007 – June 22, 2009

Fila ton vatracho sou (English: Kiss your Frog) is the title of a Greek romantic comedy television series that aired on ANT1 during the 2007–2009 season. The series starred Thodoris Atheridis and Smaragda Karydi.

== Series overview ==
Season	Episodes	Originally aired	
Season	Episodes	First aired	Last aired
1	30	October 1, 2007	June 30, 2008
2	28	October 6, 2008	June 22, 2009

== Plot ==
Stefanos is a rising politician and is preparing to marry a woman who can ensure his political advancement. Olga is a maid and raises her 8-year-old son alone. At their first meeting, a game of chance makes her look like she came out of a fairy tale, in her borrowed toilet. Two completely different worlds meet.

== Cast ==
- Thodoris Atheridis as Stefanos Theotokas
- Samragda Karydi as Olga Pavlidou
- Isabella Kogevina as Nantia Petropoulou
- Giannis Zouganelis as Giannis Pavlidis
- Ntinos Karydis as Spyridon Theotokas
- Nikos Galiatsos as Nikolas Petropoulos
- Christos Sapountzis as Ntinos
- Menia Anagnostopoulou as Santy
- Natasa Kotsovou as Sasa
- Konstantinos Papadimitriou as Billy Pavlidis
- Giannis Papavasilopoulos as Orestis Pavlidis
- Andreas Natsios as Markos
- Stefani Kapetanidi as Marietta
- Antonis Karystinos as Giorgos Antoniadis
- Evaggelia Moumouri as Mariza Farmaki
- Thanasis Alevras as Tim Saranton
- Tzoulia Argyropoulou as Alexandra-Violeta Tiniakou
