= Neopolis.gr =

Greek student website

Neopolis.gr is a Greek website that publishes articles related to the young student lifestyle. It covers topics including university updates, job offers, postgraduate studies, conferences, technology news, relationships, cinema, and other aspects relevant to youth daily life.

Neopolis was established in 2012 by three university students. In 2014, Neopolis.gr was acknowledged by the weekly newspaper To Vima as a noteworthy platform. It was also highlighted as a success story during an event organized by the municipality of Kifissia, which was covered by the Antenna Group in 2015. Additionally, Neopolis.gr has received limited media coverage on various occasions, including its role as the organizer of the "First Day at University" photo contest and as a communication sponsor for the Athens Job Festival.
