= Next Top Model (Greek TV series) season 1 =

Next Top Model
- Season 1

Release
- Original network: ANT1
- Original release: October 12, 2009 – February 15, 2010

Season chronology
- Next → Season 2

Next Top Model, Season 1 was the first season of Next Top Model. It premiered on October 12, 2009. The number of contestants was originally 17 with one semifinalist re-entering the competition after a contestant withdrew.

Greek super model Vicky Kaya (Greek: Βίκυ Καγιά) assumed the role of Tyra Banks from the original series as the head of the search as well as a mentor for the contestants. The panel consisted of the former model Jenny Balatsinou, fashion designer Christoforos Kontentos and noted photographer Charis Christopoulos.

The number of applications reached approximately 5000. Many of the applications had been sent in from abroad, which means that some of the contestants were from other countries.

The final episode aired on February 15, 2010. The winner was 20-year-old Seraina Kazamia from Crete. Her prizes included a contract with MP Management and an all-expenses paid trip to Milan, a cover and spread with Madame Figaro magazine, representation by Maybelline New York, a contract with BSB clothing line and a $18,000 Dior watch.

The international destinations were Milan, Italy and London, United Kingdom.

== Contestants ==
(Ages stated are at start of contest)

Name	Age	Height	Hometown	Finish	Place
Zoe Tranoudaki	20	1.77 m (5 ft 9 1/2 in)	Athens	Episode 2	18
Vaso Vilegas	18	1.71 m (5 ft 7 1/2 in)	Athens	Episode 3	17
Nina Kalogeropoulou-Knezevic	16	1.70 m (5 ft 7 in)	Chalcis	Episode 4	16 (quit)
Katia Marinaki	23	1.72 m (5 ft 7 1/2 in)	Larissa	Episode 4	15
Danae Georganta	19	1.71 m (5 ft 7 1/2 in)	Nafplio	Episode 5	14
Marsida Devole	17	1.70 m (5 ft 7 in)	Athens	Episode 6	13
Anthi Tsompanidou	18	1.72 m (5 ft 7 1/2 in)	Orestiada	Episode 7	12 (quit)
Areti Stathopoulou	19	1.67 m (5 ft 5 1/2 in)	Patras	Episode 8	11
Dionysia 'Denia' Agalianou	18	1.71 m (5 ft 7 1/2 in)	Zakynthos	Episode 9	10
Ramona Koseleva	22	1.75 m (5 ft 9 in)	Katerini	Episode 10	9 (quit)
Christina Pantelidi	18	1.71 m (5 ft 7 1/2 in)	Loutraki	Episode 11	8
Nayla Gougni	23	1.75 m (5 ft 9 in)	Athens	Episode 13	7
Athina Mourkoussi	20	1.74 m (5 ft 8 1/2 in)	Athens	Episode 14	6
Dimitra Alexandraki	19	1.75 m (5 ft 9 in)	Crete	Episode 16	5
Maria Iltsevich	23	1.77 m (5 ft 9 1/2 in)	Lesbos	Episode 18	4–3
Ioanna Dedi	21	1.73 m (5 ft 8 in)	Athens	Episode 18	4–3
Monika Kwiecien	18	1.76 m (5 ft 9 1/2 in)	Athens	Episode 18	2
Seraina Kazamia	20	1.74 m (5 ft 8 1/2 in)	Crete	Episode 18	1

== Episode summaries ==
=== Episode 1 ===
First aired October 12, 2009

At the premiere of the show, the girls met the judges for the first time and tried to impress them during their individual interviews. Later on, they posed for their first bikini shoot and were narrowed down to the final seventeen contestants, who would move on to the main competition.

- Featured photographer: Charis Christopoulos

=== Episode 2 ===
First aired October 19, 2009

The girls entered their model house for the first time. The next day, they took some make-up lessons and Vicky stopped by to teach them how to change their emotions in front of the mirror. The girls had to pose using face cut-outs in famous photos of Vicky. Dimitra, the winner of the challenge, picked Nayla to join her at an exclusive dinner with the judges as her prize. Later on, some girls struggled at their photo shoot which was an extreme beauty shoot with snakes.

At the judging panel, most of the girls failed to impress the judges with their performances. Athina and Zoe landed in the bottom two for elimination, but in the end Zoe was eliminated for being flat and uninspiring.

- First call-out: Monika Kwiecien
- Bottom two: Athina Mourkoussi & Zoe Tranoudaki
- Eliminated: Zoe Tranoudaki
- Featured photographer: Pantelis Zervos

=== Episode 3 ===
First aired October 26, 2009

After the first elimination, the girls learned that they were about to receive their makeovers. Some girls were happy with their new hair, while some others felt frustrated. The following day, they were coached on how to do extreme poses and this time the challenge demanded the girls to pose while holding jewelry. Danae won the challenge for being the best and picked Seraina to share the featured jewelry. At the photo shoot, the girls had to pose with and wearing meat.

Most of the girls were praised for their strong performances, but Anthi and Vaso were criticized for not focusing enough and being weak and they landed in the bottom two. Anthi was spared, while Vaso was sent home.

- First call-out: Ioanna Dedi
- Bottom two: Anthi Tsompanidou & Vaso Vilegas
- Eliminated: Vaso Vilegas
- Featured photographer: Charlie Makkos

=== Episode 4 ===
First aired November 2, 2009

The girls learned about their body and nutrition. Christoforos Kontentos visited the house to teach them about what is "fashionable" and "unfashionable". At the challenge, the girls were split into groups of five and had to assemble their own clothing line and be their own mannequins with fashion model Ismini Papavlasopoulou making a guest appearance. Each girl of the winning team, Anthi, Areti, Danae, Dimitra & Monika, won a piece of clothing from a famous clothing line and Monika earned a special piece of clothing as she was the best in her group. The photo shoot demanded the girls to pose as underwater nymphs. A lot of girls struggled, while Ioanna managed to overcome her fear of water and she impressed the judges.

At panel, Nina announced that she had to drop out of the competition due to school complications and she quit the competition. In the end, Denia's mediocre performance and Katia's age concerned the judges. Denia was saved, while Katia was sent home, leading to a very emotional elimination. Later on, the judges called back a new contestant, Maria who didn't make it to the house during the casting episode, to join the cast to replace Nina.

- Quit: Nina Kalogeropoulou-Knezevic
- First call-out: Ioanna Dedi
- Bottom two: Denia Agalianou & Katia Marinaki
- Eliminated: Katia Marinaki
- New Model: Maria Iltsevich
- Featured photographer: Thodoris Tsiachos

=== Episode 5 ===
First aired November 9, 2009

Famous journalist and TV host Tatiana Stefanidou surprised the girls at the house to teach them about the media, while their communicating skills were put to the test at a private interview with her. Many girls got very emotional and Maria, Dimitra & Christina were chosen to appear at a Greek, popular TV show, after opening up the most. Later on, the girls walked at their first Haute Couture runway show and Vicky picked Nayla, Ioanna, Dimitra & Maria (from strongest to weakest) as the winners of the challenge. They got to go out clubbing, but Vicky revealed all the girls are going to join them. This week's photo shoot was inspired by American Beauty and some girls were worried about having to pose nude covered with red roses.

At the judging panel, the girls had to walk with a bowl of fruit on their head. Nayla & Ramona were picked as the best and their prize was a special appearance at the second season of Austria's Next Topmodel. Most of the girls were praised for their pictures, but there was a huge confrontation among the judges about Dimitra's photo. In the end, Danae & Dimitra landed in bottom two. Dimitra was heavily criticized for being too sexy, but Danae was eliminated for relying too much on her previous strong performance.

- First call-out: Nayla Gougni
- Bottom two: Danae Georganda & Dimitra Alexandraki
- Eliminated: Danae Georganda
- Featured photographer: Giorgos Malekakis

=== Episode 6 ===
First aired November 16, 2009

At the beginning of the episode, Dimitra, Maria & Christina arrived at the set of the Greek, popular TV show to be interviewed. Nayla & Ramona flew to Rhodes with Vicky to make a special appearance for the second season of Austria's Next Top Model as the winners of the challenge at the last judging panel. The girls learned how to be a spokesperson and tried to pull off an impromptu sales pitch holding an item of their choice, with guidance from Savvas Poumpouras. Later on, the girls struggled to put their commercial skills to the test at a mock Axe commercial with Greek model Giorgos Manikas, but Nayla impressed with her natural and charming appeal in front of the camera and won the challenge. She picked Dimitra to share her prize, a special massage treatment. This week's night photo shoot demanded the girls to pose wearing lingerie in a fountain. The girls could strike only two poses, one of their choice and one picked by the photographer.

At the judging panel, the girls had to walk in front of the judges with one of their shoes off. Maria, Seraina & Dimitra were the winners and got to walk at Athens Fashion Week and attend the after show party. Christina experienced a panic attack and had to leave the room. Marsida's weak performance at the photo shoot and Areti's inappropriate attitude lead the two girls in bottom two. Marsida was sent home, but Vicky announced that Areti was also part of the actual elimination, but she was spared. She stated that if Areti didn't put more effort to the competition, she was going to be eliminated ultimately at the next judging panel.

- First call-out: Seraina Kazamia
- Bottom two: Areti Stathopoulou & Marsida Devole
- Eliminated: Marsida Devole
- Featured photographer: Giorgos Kalfamanolis

=== Episode 7 ===
First aired November 23, 2009

After the fifth elimination, Maria, Seraina & Dimitra attended Athens Fashion Week. Maria & Seraina impressed the designers, while Dimitra got rejected from the show. Vicky taught the girls how to pose while in the air by jumping on a trampoline. The girls were taken to a tennis court, where they were shooting various tennis shots for a client. Unknown to them, this challenge was a test to gauge their response to being under pressure and due to their good performance, they all got to spend a day in an amusement park. For this week's photo shoot, the girls were placed on a climbing wall while wearing couture gowns. Most of them excelled, but Christina couldn't get over her fear of heights.

During judging, the girls had to act out a scene derived from a verb and adverb randomly drawn from a box. Maria, Monika & Areti were considered the best and won the challenge. Monika won immunity for impressing the judges with her strong photo, while Anthi & Denia landed in bottom two. Anthi asked to leave the competition, and the two girls had an argument in front of the judges. Vicky announced that Anthi would have been eliminated regardless of her decision to quit.

- Immune: Monika Kwiecien
- Bottom two: Anthi Tsompanidou & Denia Agalianou
- Quit: Anthi Tsompanidou
- Featured photographer: Giannis Velissaridis

=== Episode 8 ===
First aired November 30, 2009

The girls received their first acting lesson and got very emotional when they revealed some of their secrets. At the challenge, they had to memorize a script and kiss a male model. Athina & Denia were the winners and got to have a dinner with the male model. At the house, Ramona expressed her will to quit after a call with her boyfriend. Later on, the girls had the chance to shoot and direct each other. At the photo shoot, the girls posed with Formula One team McLaren.

At the judging panel, Athina impressed the most with her acting skills and Seraina won immunity for having the best photo. Areti & Denia landed in bottom two, but Vicky asked the girls to exit the room for the judges to deliberate for a second time. Areti got eliminated and Vicky later announced that Denia was the actual eliminee, but she was spared after Areti's behavior in front of the judges.

- Immune: Seraina Kazamia
- Bottom two: Areti Stathopoulou & Denia Agalianou
- Eliminated: Areti Stathopoulou
- Featured photographer: Thomas Chrysochoidis

=== Episode 9 ===
First aired December 7, 2009

Vicky showed the girls how to move, walk and look sensual. Later on, Vicky and Christoforos Kontentos taught the girls about professional behavior in front of the clients. At the go-see challenge, the girls who impressed the most would appear at a spread for the fashion magazine Madame Figaro. Ioanna, Maria, Seraina & Ramona were chosen as the best, but only Ioanna & Maria were picked to share the prize. The girls put their dancing skills to the test at a dancing lesson and Dimitra was in pain due to previous injury. Nayla was determined as the best and got the leading role at a music video. At the photo shoot, Tasos Sofroniou photographed the girls impersonating music idols, as follows:

Model	Idol
Athina	Kylie Minogue
Christina	Amy Winehouse
Dimitra	Rihanna
Denia	Debbie Harry
Ioanna	Katy Perry
Maria	Madonna
Monika	Lady Gaga
Nayla	Beyoncé
Ramona	Michael Jackson
Seraina	Gene Simmons

At the judging panel, fashion icon and famous designer, Lakis Gavalas served as the guest judge and criticized each girl's walk. Monika once again stomp over everyone else and was rewarded a third first call-out, while Denia & Christina landed in bottom two and Denia was eliminated after her fourth bottom two appearance.

- First call-out: Monika Kwiecien
- Bottom two: Christina Pantelidi & Denia Agalianou
- Eliminated: Denia Agalianou
- Featured photographer: Tassos Sofroniou
- Special guest: Lakis Gavalas

=== Episode 10 ===
First aired December 14, 2009

The girls prepared their dancing moves for an upcoming music video. Dimitra struggled to cope with the other girls and decided not to participate after visiting the hospital. Seraina, Nayla, Ramona & Ioanna were chosen to have the chance to walk in Kathy Heyndels runway show, but they learned that only two of them will be selected. Vicky visited the house to teach the girls how to vary their emotions in front of the camera. The girls took some test shots showcasing different emotions and Vicky revealed later that this was an actual challenge. Monika was the winner and picked Seraina to share two pieces of expensive jewelry. The January issue of Madame Figaro arrived at the house and Ioanna & Maria got very excited to be featured on a spread. Later on, the girls shot a music video with Nayla starring as a previous prize. At the go-see for Kathy Heyndels runway show, Seraina & Nayla impressed the most and won the challenge. The girls had to depict a pillow fight scene in bed with Greek international model Dimitris Alexandrou for their photo shoot.

During judging, the challenge demanded the girls to strike a different pose whenever music stopped. Athina & Monika were determined the winners by the judges. Christina & Ramona landed in bottom two, but Ramona decided to quit. The two girls asked Vicky to announce the actual eliminee, but Vicky told the girls that there was no reason to know the result as Ramona had already quit. However she was seen holding Ramona's picture in her hands.

- First call-out: Dimitra Alexandraki
- Bottom two: Christina Pantelidi & Ramona Koseleva
- Quit: Ramona Koseleva
- Featured photographer: Petros Dellatolas

=== Episode 11 ===
First aired December 21, 2009

The girls spent their time decorating the house for Christmas. Later on, they met the Fashion Targets Breast Cancer organization and learned further information about breast cancer. Maria got emotional as her mother, who died two years ago, suffered from the disease. The next day, the girls spread the streets in order to inform people about the possible dangers of breast cancer. Nayla & Seraina walked at Kathy Heyndels runway show and chose Athina, Christina & Dimitra to attend the show. At the challenge, the girls had to pose in the air portraying different emotions while being carried by a figure skater. The two judges, Jenny Balatsinou & Charis Christopoulos, chose Athina & Dimitra as the best. The two girls got a €1000 shopping spree and everyone learned that they can pick one member of their family to visit the house in order to celebrate Christmas. At a Christmas-themed photo shoot, the girls posed as modern Santa Claus's helpers without the direction of Tasos Sofroniou. Then, they had a special celebration dinner with their house guests.

At the judging panel, the girls learned that they will travel to Milan, but only seven of them can go. The judges tested the girls' fashion knowledge, when they asked them to create a unique outfit using various Christmas decorations and still look fashionable. In the end, Christina & Monika landed in bottom two and Christina was eliminated after her third consecutive bottom two appearance.

- First call-out: Athina Mourkoussi
- Bottom two: Christina Pantelidi & Monika Kwiecien
- Eliminated: Christina Pantelidi
- Featured photographer: Giorgos Malekakis

=== Clip Show ===
First aired January 4, 2010

This was the recap episode of the season, reviewing the first eleven episodes of the season.

=== Episode 13 ===
First aired January 11, 2010

The girls travelled to Milan, but Nayla was informed by Vicky that she wouldn't be able to join them because of some missing travel documents. After arriving in Milan, they visited famous label stores such as Missoni and explored the city with male models. At a casting for DSquared^{2}, the girls had to dress themselves properly with only €50. Ioanna impressed the most and received a present from the label. Later, they visited Roberto Cavalli's offices and learned that they were going to wear the designer's clothes at their photo shoot. The photo shoot took place at the Duomo di Milano. Back in Athens, Nayla did a similar photo shoot at a studio.

During judging, most of the girls impress with their performance, but Nayla's lack of confidence and Dimitra's unprofessional behavior concerned the judges. After an argument between Vicky and Dimitra, Nayla was sent home. The elimination got the girls so upset that Dimitra left the judging room angrily.

- First call-out: Maria Iltsevich
- Bottom two: Dimitra Alexandraki & Nayla Gougni
- Eliminated: Nayla Gougni
- Featured photographer: Katerina Tsatsani

=== Episode 14 ===
First aired January 18, 2010

The girls arrived upset at the house by Nayla's surprising elimination. The next day, they were dressed as brides and posed with a male model while having to photograph themselves. Seraina won the challenge and picked Maria to share two dresses and lingerie as her prize. At a mock commercial for Kellogg's, Seraina and Dimitra impressed the most and won a spa visit. Later, the models were greeted by Jenny Balatsinou & Christoforos Kontentos and were asked to look chic wearing men's clothes. Ioanna was determined as the best and picked Monika to share a date with two male models. At a casting for Pierre Cardin, Seraina & Ioanna impressed the most and get to walk on the runway show of the designer. The photo shoot was Renaissance-inspired and the models were dressed with Haute Couture dresses.

At the judging panel, the girls had to walk in front of the judges wearing a high-fashion dress and a casual outfit. Seraina was chosen as the best. All of the girls impressed with their photos, but some of them were criticized for their runway walk. In the end, Athina and Dimitra landed in the bottom two. Athina was eliminated and Dimitra was spared for the third time.

- First call-out: Ioanna Dedi
- Bottom two: Athina Mourkoussi & Dimitra Alexandraki
- Eliminated: Athina Mourkoussi
- Featured photographer: Dimitris Skoulos

=== Episode 15 ===
First aired January 25, 2010

Ioanna & Seraina walked at Pierre Cardin runway show. The girls visited Christoforos Kontentos's studio to practice and receive constructive criticism for their walk. Later, they met with Charis Christopoulos to learn how to pose looking sexy and feminine. At the challenge, they participated at a mock Vodafone commercial. Dimitra & Maria impressed the most and won a brand new cell phone as their prize. The other day, the girls met with Jenny Balatsinou and learnt more about styling. At their photo shoot, they posed as Romani Gypsies. Vicky invited the girls at a party for a charitable organization.

At the judging panel, the judges were let down by some girls' performance and struggled to make a decision. During judges deliberation, there was a lot of tension between the girls. Dimitra, Maria & Seraina argued with Ioanna & Monika. In the end, Maria & Monika landed in bottom two. Vicky surprised the girls when she announced that none of them was eliminated and both girls were still in the running to becoming The Next Top Model.

- First call-out: Ioanna Dedi
- Bottom two: Maria Iltsevich & Monika Kwiecien
- Eliminated: None
- Featured photographer: Tassos Sofroniou

=== Episode 16 ===
First aired February 1, 2010

The girls were split into two groups after the last controversial judging panel. Dimitra, Maria & Seraina argued with Ioanna & Monika leading to some tension in the house. The next day, the girls got the chance to appear as backup dancers on the Greek X Factor. Dimitra, Seraina & Ioanna impressed the most and won the challenge. The girls visited the zoo and their challenge required them to show their "wild side" and pose as animals. Ioanna & Monika were determined as the best. Later on, the girls posed for the February issue of popular Greek magazine Nitro and the shots were evaluated at the judging panel. At their first photoshoot, the models posed as Fairies hanging in the air. During the shoot, there was some serious tension between the two groups of girls. At their second photo shoot for the week, they participated in an extreme beauty shot with paint photographed by Charis Christopoulos. The girls decided to put an end to their conflict, but Dimitra denied to join the rest of the models.

During judging, Vicky announced they would be travelling to London. Maria & Monika impressed with their overall performance, while the rest of the girls disappointed the judges for different reasons. In the end, Dimitra and Ioanna landed in bottom two. Dimitra was eliminated after her fourth bottom two appearance.

- First call-out: Maria Iltsevich
- Bottom two: Dimitra Alexandraki & Ioanna Dedi
- Eliminated: Dimitra Alexandraki
- Featured photographer: Pantelis Zervos, Charis Christopoulos, Roula Revi

=== Episode 17 ===
First aired February 8, 2010

The girls were excited to visit to London, but Maria learnt she wouldn't be able to go due to some missing travel documents. After the girls arrived, they headed to explore the city where they met Vicky. The next day, they visited the famous mannequin design company Rootstein and had to impress the creative director. Ioanna won the challenge, getting her figure featured on the company's collection and the chance to travel back to London. Later on, they went a retro boutique with avant-garde clothing. The challenge demanded the girls to choose an extreme outfit and walk in front of Vicky and the boutique's owner. Monika was determined as the best and got to pick a piece of clothing from the store. The next morning, the models visited Select Model Management and met with casting directors to learn more about go-sees and international castings. Top model Eliza Cummings was also there to talk to the girls. Then, they were sent to go-sees for various designers and Monika was chosen as the best. Her prize was the chance to walk in London Fashion Week. Their fourth challenge was a casting for InStyle. Seraina impressed the most and received a future six-page spread. At their photo shoot, the girls were taken to the set of an ancient English castle. The theme was Castle Couture and the model who impressed the most would be feature on Drama fashion magazine on a tribute to Isabella Blow. Monika was determined as the best, leading to her third emotional scene during the episode, as she mentioned a part of her dreams was coming true.

Before their departure, the girls received a phone call from Maria and were informed that there was going to be no judging panel that week and the final week would follow as they returned home.

- Eliminated: No judging panel
- Featured photographer: Ram Shergill

=== Episode 18 ===
First aired February 15, 2010

The girls returned from London and joined Maria back at the house. They learnt they were going to travel to the snowy mountains for the location of their first photo shoot. There, Vicky informed them that they were going to meet with some clients during their stay, who they all impressed. The next morning, they learnt how to ski as a mock commercial they would participate demanded. Monika stood out the most and was determined as the best. At their first photo shoot they posed wearing lingerie in the snow. Then, they traveled back to Athens for their second and final photo shoot. The girls were transformed into Couture Sailor Women. Later, they were invited to dinner by Vicky where she advised and guided the girls for the last time before the irfinal performance. The girls arrived where the fashion show for Christoforos Kontentos would take place. All of the girls impressed with their walk, while Maria was lauded for her professional handling of the situation when her shoes took off while on the runway.

At the final judging, all of the girls were praised for their performance at the photo shoots and runway show. After the first deliberation, the girls were split into groups of two and were called forward. One of them would move on and the other would be eliminated. Maria & Seraina was the first group and Ioanna & Monika was the second with Monika & Seraina making to the final two leading to two emotional eliminations.

- Eliminated: Maria Iltsevich & Ioanna Dedi

Then, the portfolios of the remaining girls were evaluated with Monika impressing the most, while Seraina was praised, but still criticized for her lack of spirit and consistency. During the final deliberation, the judges were divided over their preference of the girls. After a long wait, the girls were called back and Vicky announced Seraina Kazamia as the first winner of The Next Top Model.

- Final two: Monika Kwiecien & Seraina Kazamia
- Greece's Next Top Model: Seraina Kazamia
- Featured photographers: Gerasimos Fronimos, Dimitris Skoulos

== Summaries ==
=== Call-out order ===
Order	Episodes																
Order	1	2	3	4	5	6	7	8	9	10	11	13	14	15	16	18	
1	Ioanna	Monika	Ioanna	Ioanna	Nayla	Seraina	Monika	Seraina	Monika	Dimitra	Athina	Maria	Ioanna	Ioanna	Maria	Seraina	Seraina
2	Seraina	Christina	Christina	Monika	Marsida	Nayla	Ramona	Maria	Ramona	Ioanna	Ioanna	Athina	Seraina	Dimitra	Monika	Maria	Monika
3	Danae	Danae	Danae	Danae	Monika	Ioanna	Seraina	Nayla	Nayla	Seraina	Dimitra	Ioanna	Maria	Seraina	Seraina	Monika	
4	Zoe	Ioanna	Marsida	Anthi	Ioanna	Maria	Ioanna	Athina	Athina	Athina	Maria	Monika	Monika	Maria; Monika	Ioanna	Ioanna	
5	Vaso	Marsida	Nayla	Christina	Maria	Dimitra	Maria	Christina	Seraina	Maria	Nayla	Seraina	Dimitra	Maria; Monika	Dimitra		
6	Athina	Dimitra	Dimitra	Ramona	Ramona	Christina	Areti	Ioanna	Ioanna	Monika	Seraina	Dimitra	Athina				
7	Marsida	Seraina	Nina	Athina	Denia	Monika	Athina	Dimitra	Dimitra	Nayla	Monika	Nayla					
8	Nayla	Areti	Athina	Marsida	Seraina	Athina	Nayla	Monika	Maria	Ramona	Christina						
9	Ramona	Katia	Denia	Nayla	Anthi	Denia	Dimitra	Ramona	Christina	Christina							
10	Areti	Ramona	Ramona	Areti	Areti	Anthi	Christina	Denia	Denia								
11	Katia	Nayla	Katia	Seraina	Christina	Ramona	Denia	Areti									
12	Nina	Nina	Areti	Dimitra	Athina	Areti	Anthi										
13	Denia	Vaso	Seraina	Denia	Dimitra	Marsida											
14	Christina	Anthi	Monika	Katia	Danae												
15	Dimitra	Denia	Anthi	Nina													
16	Monika	Athina	Vaso														
17	Anthi	Zoe															

The contestant was eliminated
The contestant quit the competition
The contestant was the original eliminee, but was saved
The contestant was immune from elimination
The contestant was part of a non-elimination bottom two
The contestant won the competition

- In Episode 1, the pool of 200 girls was whittled down to 17.
- In Episode 4, Nina withdrew the competition due to scholar issues. She was replaced by Maria, who was originally cut in the semi-finals, after Katia's elimination.
- In Episode 6, originally both Areti and Marsida were the eliminees, but Vicky saved Areti.
- In Episode 7, Monika won immunity from elimination as a result of having produced the best photo.
- In Episode 7, Anthi landed in bottom two and quit. Vicky announced that she would have been eliminated regardless of her decision to quit.
- In Episode 8, Seraina won immunity from elimination as a result of having produced the best photo.
- In Episode 8, Denia was the original eliminee, but she was saved due to Areti's unprofessional behavior in front of the judges.
- In Episode 10, Ramona landed in bottom two and quit, automatically saving Christina from elimination. Vicky did not announce who the eliminee was, but she was shown holding Ramona's picture in her hands.
- Episode 12 was the recap episode.
- In Episode 15, no-one was eliminated.
- In Episode 17, Maria could not travel to London due to some missing travel documents and did not participate in the photo shoot. Furthermore, there was no judging panel or elimination. All four girls were put through simultaneously by the judges.
- In Episode 18, the girls were split into groups of two and were called forward. One of them would move on and the other would be eliminated. Maria & Seraina were the first group and Ioanna & Monika were the second with Monika & Seraina making it to the final two.

=== Bottom two ===
Episode	Contestants	Eliminated
2	Athina & Zoe	Zoe
3	Anthi & Vaso	Vaso
4	Denia & Katia	Nina
4	Denia & Katia	Katia
5	Danae & Dimitra	Danae
6	Areti & Marsida	Marsida
7	Anthi & Denia	Anthi
8	Areti & Denia	Areti
9	Christina & Denia	Denia
10	Christina & Ramona	Ramona
11	Christina & Monika	Christina
13	Dimitra & Nayla	Nayla
14	Athina & Dimitra	Athina
15	Maria & Monika	None
16	Dimitra & Ioanna	Dimitra
18	Maria & Seraina	Maria
18	Ioanna & Monika	Ioanna
18	Monika & Seraina	Monika

The contestant was eliminated after her first time in the bottom two
The contestant was eliminated after her second time in the bottom two
The contestant was eliminated after her third time in the bottom two
The contestant was eliminated after her fourth time in the bottom two
The contestant was eliminated in the final judging and placed third
The contestant was eliminated in the final judging and placed as the runner-up

=== Average call-out order ===
Episode 1, Episode 12, Episode 17 & Episode 18 are not included.

Rank by average	Place	Model	Call-out total	Number of call-outs	Call-out average
1	3-4	Ioanna	42	14	3.00
2	3-4	Maria	42	11	3.82
3	2	Monika	64	14	4.57
4	1	Seraina	71	14	5.07
5	7	Nayla	61	11	5.55
6	14	Danae	23	4	5.75
7	5	Dimitra	87	14	6.21
8	13	Marsida	32	5	6.40
9	6	Athina	79	12	6.58
10	8	Christina	67	10	6.70
11	9	Ramona	64	9	7.11
12	16	Nina	19	2	9.50
13	11	Areti	69	7	9.86
14	10	Denia	84	8	10.50
15	12	Anthi	64	6	10.67
16	15	Katia	34	3	11.33
17	17	Vaso	29	2	14.50
18	18	Zoe	17	1	17.00

=== Photo shoot guide ===
- Episode 1 photo shoot: Bikini shoot (casting)
- Episode 2 photo shoot: Extreme beauty shots with snakes
- Episode 3 photo shoot: Meat packing industry
- Episode 4 photo shoot: Underwater nymphs
- Episode 5 photo shoot: American Beauty
- Episode 6 photo shoot: Lingerie in a fountain
- Episode 7 photo shoot: Couture rock climbing
- Episode 8 photo shoot: Posing with formula one team McLaren
- Episode 9 photo shoot: Music idol impersonations
- Episode 10 photo shoot: Pillow fight with a male model
- Episode 11 photo shoot: Santa Claus' helpers
- Episode 13 photo shoot: Duomo di Milano wearing Roberto Cavalli designs
- Episode 14 photo shoot: Renaissance couture
- Episode 15 photo shoot: Posing as gypsies with a horse
- Episode 16 photo shoots: Fairies in the air; extreme beauty shots with paint; Nitro magazine spread
- Episode 17 photo shoot: Castle couture
- Episode 18 photo shoots: Lingerie in the snow; couture sailor women

=== Makeovers ===
- Anthi - Cut shorter
- Areti - Cut short and dyed darker
- Athina - Cut shorter and dyed lighter
- Christina - Shoulder length and curly
- Danae - Cut shorter and dyed black
- Dimitra - Bob cut
- Denia - Dyed darker and extensions removed
- Ioanna - Dyed honey blonde
- Katia - Cut shorter, dyed dark brown and curly
- Marsida - Dyed fire engine red and more volume
- Monika - Dyed lighter and bangs
- Nayla - Dyed lighter
- Nina - Dyed blonde
- Ramona - Dyed lighter
- Seraina - More volume
- Vasso - Bob cut

== Judges ==
- Vicky Kaya
- Jenny Balatsinou
- Christoforos Kontentos
- Charis Christopoulos

=== Other Cast Members ===
- Tassos Sofroniou - Photo Director
