= Prva Srpska Televizija =

Serbian national television network

Prva Televizija
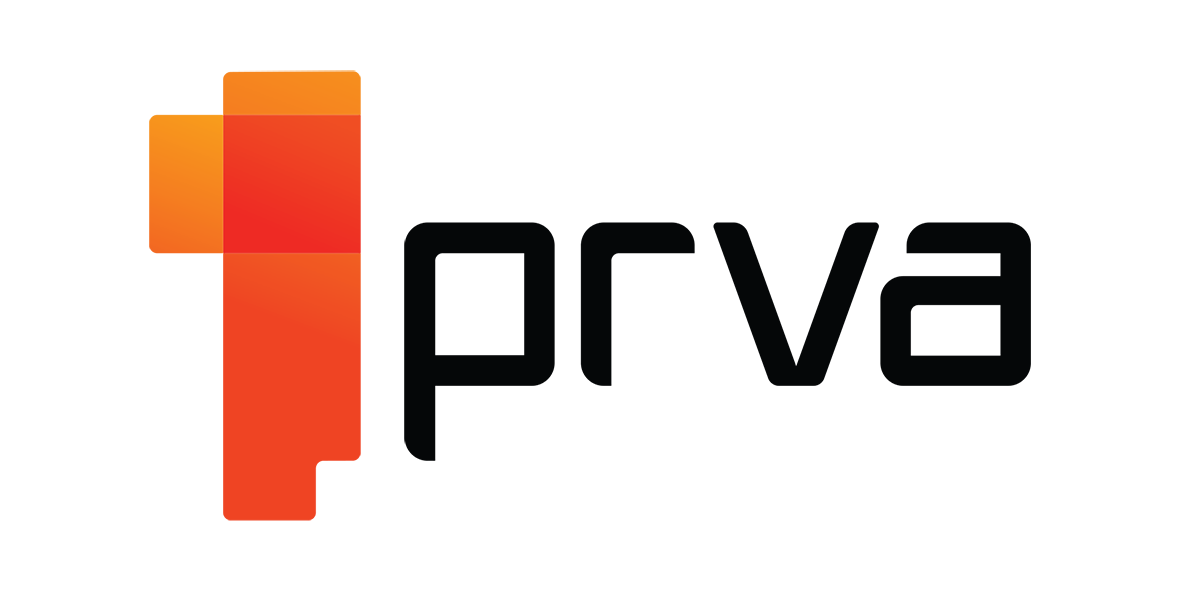
- Country: Serbia
- Headquarters: Zemun, Autoput 22

Programming
- Picture format: 16:9 (1080i, HDTV)

Ownership
- Owner: Srđan Milovanović (Kopernikus Corporation)
- Sister channels: B92; Prva Plus; Prva World; Prva Max; Prva Kick; Prva Life; Prva Files; Prva Imagine

History
- Launched: 31 December 2006
- Former names: Fox Televizija (2006–2010)

Links
- Website: www.prva.rs, www.prvatv.me

Prva (pronounced [pr̩̂ːʋaː]; Serbian Cyrillic: Прва, lit. 'First') or Prva Srpska Televizija (Serbian Cyrillic: Прва српска телевизија, lit. 'First Serbian Television'), is a Serbian commercial television network with national coverage. It was launched on 31 December 2006, at 7 pm, as Fox Televizija.

From its inception until December 2009, it was majority-owned by the global media conglomerate News Corporation (News Corp), which attached its Fox brand to the operation, naming Dan Bates as the CEO. During its time under News Corporation, Fox televizija closely co-operated with News Corporation–owned networks in neighbouring countries, such as bTV in Bulgaria and Fox Turkey, sharing production capabilities on specific projects and making use of their experienced staff. Though quickly establishing itself on the Serbian television market and improving its viewership stake year after year, Fox televizija was a money-losing operation, posting an annual loss in both 2007 and 2008. By August 2009, major restructuring was initiated at the network, with 60% of its news division staff being laid off in preparation for the network sale that occurred several months later.

From December 2009 until December 2018, the network was owned by the Greek media company Antenna Group. Following the December 2009 sale of Fox televizija to Antenna Group and a transitional period of several months during which Bates continued as CEO, the job was handed over to Dejan Jocić in March 2010. The Fox televizija name continued to be used until the start of the next television season on 18 September 2010, when the network was rebranded as Prva srpska televizija or Prva. Jocić, a German-born Serb and former ProSieben managing director, presided over Prva's expansion into the Montenegrin television market with the August 2012 establishment of its sister channel – Prva TV Crna Gora. Three years later, on 16 April 2013, the network's editor-in-chief Dragan Nenadović was promoted to the position of Prva's CEO.

== History ==
=== Fox televizija ===
Logo used from 6 September 2006 to 20 September 2010

News Corp was one of the five commercial groups that won the national broadcasting license in Serbia at a public tender organized by the Serbian Broadcasting Agency in April 2006. In doing so, they beat out stiff competition from German RTL Group, which also wanted to start a Serbian operation. News Corp named Dan Bates, an experienced television executive to be the CEO of its upstart Serbian operation.

Approximately three months later, on 6 September 2006, an entity named Fox televizija started broadcasting a test signal consisting solely of the superimposed Fox logo. Three days later, on 9 September 2006, at precisely 8 pm, they aired their first actual program—a nature documentary that lasted about 45 minutes—before reverting to the Fox logo test signal. This setup (test signal most of the day with a single taped program at 8 pm) continued for the next ten days or so. Their primetime lineup was then somewhat expanded to include a few Latin telenovelas, occasional feature films, and a weekly ULEB Cup basketball game featuring Serbian teams (the basketball broadcasts were their first in-house productions). During daytime hours, they broadcast a test signal, old episodes of canceled Croatian talk-show Sanja, and music videos. On 5 December 2006, before the ULEB Cup match featuring Red Star Belgrade vs PAOK basketball teams, a riot broke out between two sets of fans in Pionir Hall and the footage shot by Fox televizija was shown across the world.

On 22 December 2006, Fox televizija aired its first news programme featuring live reports from Belgrade's Republic Square during the decorative tree lighting ceremonies. Then on 31 December at 7 pm, Fox televizija finally launched officially with a live-to-air broadcast called Fox stiže as part of their newscast Fox Danas, hosted that day by Zoran Baranac and Jovana Jakić. Amongst other things, the programme featured News Corp's chairman Rupert Murdoch wishing the citizens of Serbia a Happy New Year 2007 and an unsuccessful attempt to link up with Fox News' studio in Baghdad via satellite.

During its initial period of official broadcasting, Fox televizija's entertainment programming mostly relied on old and inexpensive American sitcoms, dramas, and soaps such as The Bold and the Beautiful, ALF, Hollywood Safari, El Cuerpo del Deseo, and Police Academy, with One Tree Hill, Cold Case, and The Amazing Race being the only possible exceptions to the "cheap & old" rule. As far as locally produced content, in addition to the evening newscast Fox Danas at 7 pm and the nightly one Fox Fokus at 10 pm, Fox's news division covered the Serbian parliamentary elections on 21 January 2007 with a one-off programme Ubedi pobedi hosted by news division head Tanja Vidojević.

During April 2007, in co-operation with Adrenalin production, the network started its most ambitious project up to that point with an hour-long entertainment talk-show hosted by actor Marko Živić airing nightly on weekdays at 10:30 pm. Pretty much simultaneously, a daytime lifestyle talk-show Katarina hosted by former model Katarina Rebrača began to air daily at 10 am as well as the morning 7 am programme called Fox i prijatelji.

=== 2007–08 season ===
For the new season, its first one in earnest, Fox televizija revamped the lineup with a locally-produced franchised quiz show, Da li ste pametniji od đaka petaka? They also discontinued the Marko Živić Show and Katarina, meaning that both shows ended after just a couple of months on the air. Other new programs included WWE Wrestling with local commentators (which was eventually moved to a late-night slot after viewer complaints); U tuđoj koži, in which local celebrities swapped lives for a day (canceled after only a few episodes due to extremely low ratings, but later resurfaced on competing RTV Pink); and Ludi kamen (a dating game show that continues to this day). Another new show was Ne daj se, Nina, produced in cooperation with Croatian RTL Televizija.

Fox televizija created a minor controversy in early September 2007 when it decided to take its late-night program, Marko Živić Show, off the air. Despite becoming fairly prominent over a short period (it premiered on 24 April 2007), the official statement from Fox explained that the cancellation was "a temporary measure aimed at freeing up Fox televizija's fall schedule for more movies and series." However, some Serbian print media questioned why a network struggling for viewership would remove its highest-rated program from the air.

The network started flexing its muscle in sports by obtaining the rights for Spanish football's Primera División, and, in October 2007, the rights for the Adriatic Basketball League.

November 2007 saw the premiere of a late-night talk show, Oralno doba, hosted by Lane Gutović. On 31 December 2007, the first anniversary of official broadcasting, Fox Danas and Fox Fokus newscasts both were canceled and were replaced by two editions of Fox Vesti.

Then in spring 2008, in cooperation with its sister networks bTV and Fox Turkey, Fox televizija started airing the local version of the French reality show Fort Boyard. Around the same time, the daytime programme Posle kafe began airing on weekdays at 11 am, hosted initially by Danka Novović, Olja Rakić, and Bojana Kesić who were soon joined by other hosts as well. In early summer 2008, the morning programme Fox i prijatelji (a local version of the Fox News programme Fox and Friends) was canceled.

For the summer 2008, while its regular programmes were on hiatus, Fox televizija shifted its lineup a bit and aired as Fox Non-Stop nightly, from 9 pm, with a succession of movies and mini-series. During the same summer, on 21 July 2008, the network got a scoop by first reporting the arrest of Radovan Karadžić late in the night and interrupting its regularly scheduled programming to go live on-air in breaking-news format until the early morning hours.

=== Rumoured 2008 sale ===
In mid-July 2008, speculation appeared that News Corp was considering offers to sell all its Eastern European assets including Fox televizija. The company reportedly hired the Lehman Brothers financial-services firm to ascertain the value and strategic options of its three Eastern European stations after being approached by multiple suitors.

By early September, the activity reportedly intensified with various Serbian press outlets reporting that German RTL Group and Bermuda-based Ronald Lauder-managed CME were the most interested parties in buying the three Fox stations based in Serbia, Latvia, and Bulgaria.

However, by late October, both parties pulled out of the deal. CME left due to the 2008 financial crisis, while RTL decided to pursue other courses of action as far as entering the Serbian television market was concerned, with their interest turning to buying TV Avala.

=== 2008–09 season ===
Starting its second full season on 22 September 2008, Fox televizija introduced a variety of changes, the most noticeable being a new visual identity similar to other News Corp stations around Europe. Also on the same day, Fox Vesti's evening newscast at 7 pm was moved to 6 pm and extended from 30 minutes to a full hour, while the 7 pm slot was taken over by the hit American drama Lost that thus premiered on the network. Also Fox Vesti at 10 pm was moved an hour later to 11 pm. In the morning, the news programme Fox 900 sekundi premiered at 7 am as a replacement for Fox i prijatelji. About a month later Survivor Srbija (the local version of the global reality show that was shot during summer 2008) started airing. In late December, Fajront Republika, a weekly entertainment talk-show premiered, and right away established a devoted youth following that translated into strong ratings.

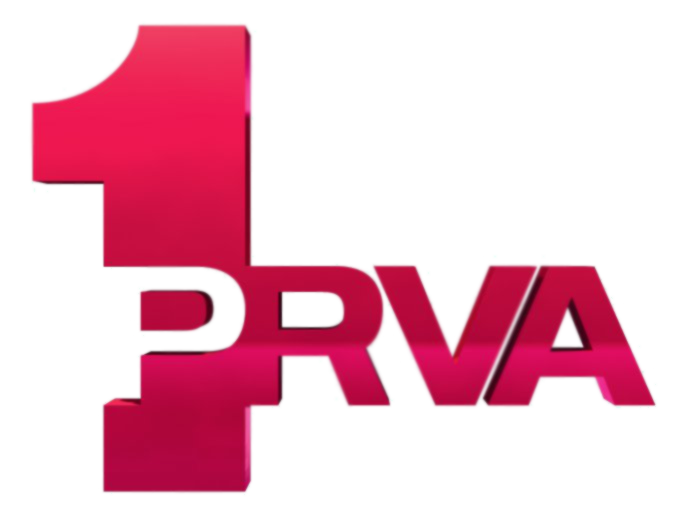
Network's logo from 2010 until 2015

On 14 February 2009, the first-season finale of Survivor Srbija aired live, bringing the network its biggest audience share ever. After the end of the Survivor season, the network introduced a Japanese sports entertainment show Ninja Warrior, which has managed to post strong ratings as well.

=== 2009 layoffs ===
On 20 August 2009, ahead of its third full season on the air, Fox televizija initiated massive cost-cutting measures. The move had the biggest effect on the network's news division, where 60% of the employees (on-air personalities and technical staff) were laid off. On the same occasion, the network canceled the morning news program Fox 900 sekundi that had been on the air for less than a year. Fox televizija's spokesperson said the layoffs were initiated due to the "financial consequences of the economic crisis". In total, around sixty of Fox televizija's full-time employees, including the news division head Tanja Vidojević, were laid off as well as tens of contractors as part of cost-cutting measures throughout News Corp's assets worldwide during the spring and summer 2009 following heavy losses reported by News Corp at the beginning of the year. On 20 September 2010, Fox televizija changed its name to Prva srpska televizija.

=== 2009–10 season ===
A new, third full season began on 8 October 2009, with shows such as Fajront Republika, by Zoran Kesić, and Ludi Kamen, with Srđan Karanović, but from this season with Aleksandra Obradović as well, and the new show Mame u štrajku. On the next day the quiz Serbian Open began, with Serbian contestants. On 19 October 2009, the drama series Na terapiji, recorded from December 2008 to March 2009, which contains 45 episodes, and the reality show Survivor Serbia 2 began. The programme Posle kafe was replaced by the programme Važne stvari.

On 12 October 2009, Fox televizija introduced an all-new visual identity. The background color is orange; in the foreground, for the television logo, the letter "X" is emphasized, instead of the letter "O". There is also new theme music. The television logo was dropped from upper right corner of the screen, less than three years after launching. The new slogan became Uključi se! ("Tune In!"), and their website was also redesigned. On same day, the studio for Fox Vesti was also changed.

=== 2013–14 season ===
The season started on 2 September 2013. Prva got a modified look, with the logo moving to the bottom right instead of center right, before and after commercials or promos, and dark areas except for the 'P' which stayed white. Nothing happened to the logo during the programme. On 27 January 2014, Prva redesigned its news studio, changing the background color from orange to lavender, and re-added the balustrade (the one used in late 2000s). Prva launched the cable TV channel Prva Plus.

The popular series Kako vreme prolazi, Plač Violine, and Otvorena vrata continued to air. Also, the 5th season of Veče sa Ivanom Ivanovićem started on 13 September. On 12 October, Prva started to air a new show – Tvoje lice zvuči poznato or TLZP, the Serbian version of Your Face Sounds Familiar. New seasons of popular shows started to air – Domaćine, oženi se, Galileo, Žene, Exkluziv, Exploziv – and there were also two new shows: Moja velika svadba (that was previously aired on RTV Pink) and Volim prirodu. There were also some new TV series this season: Ispovest, Institut, Sinđelići (a Serbian remake of Los Serrano), and Karadayı. Papijeva ekipa and Žene sa Dedinja would start airing. In December, Fatmagül'ün Suçu Ne? started airing.

A New Year program returned as the New Year special Tvoje lice zvuči poznato, the first one being set at the end of 2011 and was the New Year special of the first season of Prvi glas Srbije. On 20 January 2014, the rerun of the TV series Na Terapiji started airing on every weekday except Friday, and also Umutsuz Ev Kadınları, the Turkish version of Desperate Housewives started to air. On 25 January 2014, the rerun of Crni Gruja started airing on weekends. Ples sa Zvezdama (the local version of Dancing with the Stars) aired from 29 March 2014, until 18 June 2014. On 19 February 2014, Prva announced that Toga se niko nije setio, the local version of the Pointless game show, would start airing soon. Draga Saveta and Otvorena vrata started airing on 26 March 2014. Toga se niko nije setio started airing on 5 April 2014. Fourteen celebrities started dancing in the new dance competition, Ples sa Zvezdama, which started airing on 29 March 2014. The rerun of the first Tvoje lice zvuči poznato aired during August, on weekends at 4 pm.

=== 2014–15 season ===
The season started on 1 September 2014, with some small changes: the news program would, as in 2010, go back to 6 pm. The network also announced that a 6th (also the second-to-last) season of Veče sa Ivanom Ivanovićem would air, with the 2nd season of Tvoje lice zvuči poznato. It is unknown whether the network would change its visual identity.

=== 2015–16 season ===
The season started on 1 September 2015, and a new visual identity was created, including a new logo, which was first shown on 1 September at 6 pm, at the same time its news program started.

The new season included the 2015 regular season of Veliki brat, airing also on channel B92, making it the first ever television show to air on two Serbian television networks. It also planned a local version of My Mom Cooks Better Than Yours.

== Ownership ==
Fox televizija

At its inception, Fox televizija was 49% owned by News Corporation, since Serbian laws don't allow foreign-based subjects to own 50% percent or more of a television network with a nationwide broadcasting license. At that time the other 51% stake was spread among Dragan Karanović (21%), ITV2066 d.o.o. (owned by Branko Salić, 15%), and Istočna TV d.o.o. (owned by Zoran Popović and Branislav Bukvić, 15%). In 2008, there was a lot of buzz in the media about Fox televizija being sold to CME group, but nothing came of it.

Antenna Group acquisition

In late 2009, following an earlier sighting of Greek billionaire and Antenna Group owner Minos Kyriakou in Belgrade, the sale of News Corp's 49% stake in Fox televizija to Greek media company Antenna Group for an undisclosed amount was announced with the change of ownership officially taking effect on the first day of 2010. The Fox brand continued to be used. Though the amount of the Greek purchase remained undisclosed it was widely speculated in Serbian media that it was $1 plus the takeover of all of Fox televizija's debts.

ANT1 Group controls the 49% stake in Fox televizija through a Greece-based entity called Warraner Ltd. As for the other 51% stake, it was also taken over by ANT1 Group; however, that was done through Serbian-based entity called Nova Broadcasting d.o.o., which is owned by another one of ANT1 Group's subsidiary in Greece – Antenna Stream TV Ltd.

Kopernikus

In December 2018, Kopernikus Technology's former owner purchased B92 and Prva Srpska Televizija from ANT1 Group for 180 million euros, one month after Telekom Srbija bought Kopernikus Technology for 190 million euros. The transaction between state-owned Telekom Srbija and Kopernikus created public outrage in Serbia as Kopenikus's market worth at the time of purchase was several times lower than the amount it was purchased for; it was also revealed that a major stakeholder in the company was a close relative of a ruling Serbian Progressive Party officer.

== Format ==
Prva's own shows are broadcast in 16:9 format, which gives the people a higher image standard, known as Widescreen.

== Ratings ==
According to AGB Nielsen Media Research for the calendar year 2007, among the Serbian channels with national coverage, Fox televizija held fifth place in overall viewership (4.7% TV market share and 2.2 million average daily viewers tuning in for at least one minute), behind RTS 1 (Serbian TV channel) (26.5%), Pink (23.5%), B92 (9.3%), and RTS 2 (6.8%).

Over the calendar year 2008, Fox televizija still held fifth place among the national broadcasters; however, its market share increased to 6.4%.

For the overall viewership during 2009 calendar year, Fox's share further increased to 7.8%, which meant that it overtook RTS2 and improved to fourth place in the list, still behind RTS1 (26.0%), Pink (23.8%), and B92 (8.0%), but ahead of RTS2 (5.8%). For a while, Fox was even ahead of B92 in third place, but B92 managed to pull ahead in the end due to Veliki brat broadcasts during the last quarter.

== Financials ==
According to its calendar year 2007 annual financial report submitted to Serbian Economic Register Agency, the company had 80 employees and it posted a loss of RSD494,513,000 (approximately €6.2 million at the time with the approximate exchange rate of €1=RSD80).

In the 2008 annual report, the company reported 40 employees and a loss of RSD441,330,000 (approximately €4.9 million at the time with the approximate exchange rate of €1=RSD90).
