= Da li ste pametniji od đaka petaka? =

Serbian game show

Da li ste pametniji od đaka petaka? was a Serbian game show broadcast by Fox televizija. It is a licensed version of the global Are You Smarter Than a 5th Grader? franchise.

The show was aired weekly and it lasted only for one season. The show was hosted by Voja Nedeljković. The top prize was RSD 5,555,555 (around €70,000). Though broadcast on a network seen only in Serbia, and produced in Serbian, the show was actually taped in Sofia, Bulgaria in the same studio as the show's Bulgarian version Това го знае всяко хлапе! that aired on bTV.

Question	Value
1	RSD2,500
2	RSD5,000
3	RSD10,000
4	RSD25,000
5	RSD50,000
6	RSD75,000
7	RSD150,000
8	RSD250,000
9	RSD500,000
10	RSD1,000,000
11	RSD5,555,555
