= Pointless =

British TV quiz show (2009–present)

- Also known as: Pointless Celebrities (celebrity version)
- Genre: Quiz show
- Directed by: Nick Harris; Julian Smith; Jonathan Glazier; Richard Valentine; Richard van't Riet; Stuart McDonald (Pointless Celebrities)
- Presented by: Alexander Armstrong; Richard Osman (Note: Osman retired from co-presenting the main series in 2022, but continued to co-present Pointless Celebrities.); Guest co-presenters (Note: Regular series only, the role of co-presenter has currently been filled by Sally Lindsay, Stephen Mangan, Lauren Laverne, Konnie Huq, Alex Brooker, Ed Gamble, Rose Matafeo, Ria Lina, Lucy Porter, Gyles Brandreth, Nish Kumar, Andi Oliver, Sally Phillips, Vick Hope, Hugh Dennis, Anita Rani, Gabby Logan, Josh Widdicombe, Desiree Burch, Chris Ramsey, Gok Wan, Rob Rinder, Ellie Taylor, Liza Tarbuck, Phil Wang, Mel Giedroyc, Angela Rippon, Trevor Nelson, Judi Love, Gethin Jones, Tom Allen, Angela Scanlon, Susan Wokoma, Michael Ball, Ben Miller, Sara Pascoe, and Clare Balding.)
- Theme music composer: Marc Sylvan
- Country of origin: United Kingdom
- Original language: English
- No. of series: 36 (Regular); 17 (Celebrity)
- No. of episodes: 2250 (Note: As of 17 September 2026, the number of episodes comprises: 1893 regular episodes (35 series); 357 celebrity episodes (17 series))

Production
- Executive producers: Pam Cavannagh; Tom Blakeson; David Flynn; Richard Hague; Tamara Gilder
- Producers: Michelle Woods; Ed de Burgh; John Ryan; Laura Turner
- Production locations: Television Centre (2009–2012, 2017); Elstree Studios (2013–present); Riverside Studios (2023, 2025)
- Editors: Hannah Barnes; Peter Elphick; David Horwell; Neil Hunter; Nick Parker
- Camera setup: Multi-camera
- Running time: 45 minutes (Regular); 50 minutes (Celebrity)
- Production companies: Brighter Pictures (2009); Remarkable Entertainment (2010–present) (Note: Known from 2010 to 2016 as Remarkable Television)

Original release
- Network: BBC Two
- Release: 24 August 2009 – 15 April 2011
- Network: BBC One
- Release: 11 July 2011 – present

Pointless is a British television quiz show produced by Banijay UK Productions subsidiary Remarkable Entertainment for the BBC and hosted by Alexander Armstrong. In each episode, four teams of two contestants attempt to find correct but obscure answers to four rounds of general knowledge questions, with the winning team eligible to compete for the show's cash jackpot.

Pointless debuted on BBC Two on 24 August 2009. The success of the first three series led the BBC to move it to BBC One from 2011. As of September 2026, the programme is airing Series 36 and has had peak audience figures of over 7 million viewers. An offshoot of the show entitled Pointless Celebrities aired between 2011 and 2025 and aired for 17 series. The format has been exported internationally.

The first 27 series were co-presented by Richard Osman, who announced on 8 April 2022 that he would step down from the role to focus more on his writing career. Beginning with Series 28, a group of guests took his place. Osman continued to co-present with Armstrong on Pointless Celebrities.

== Development ==
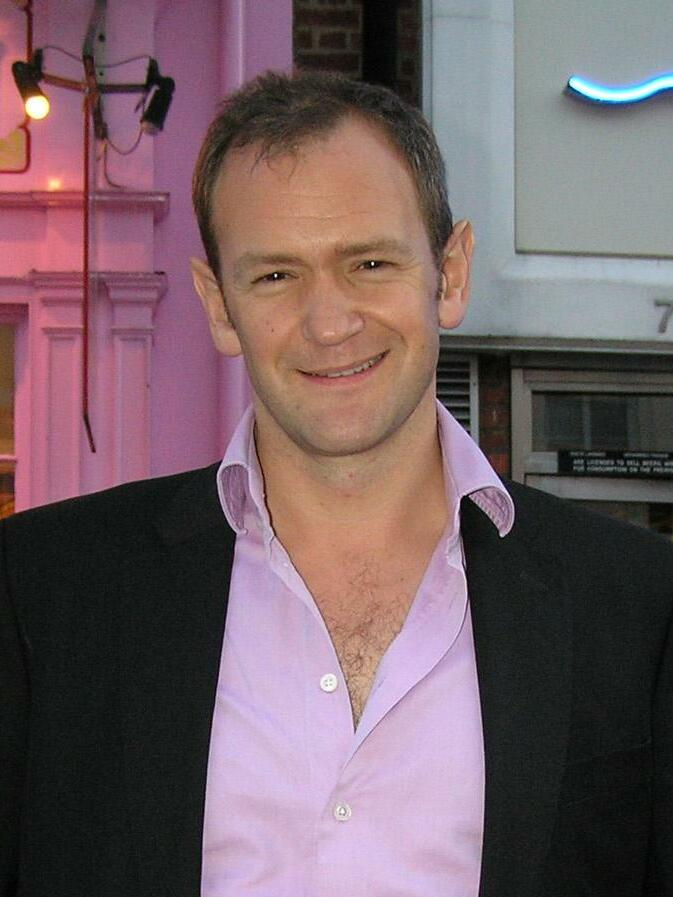
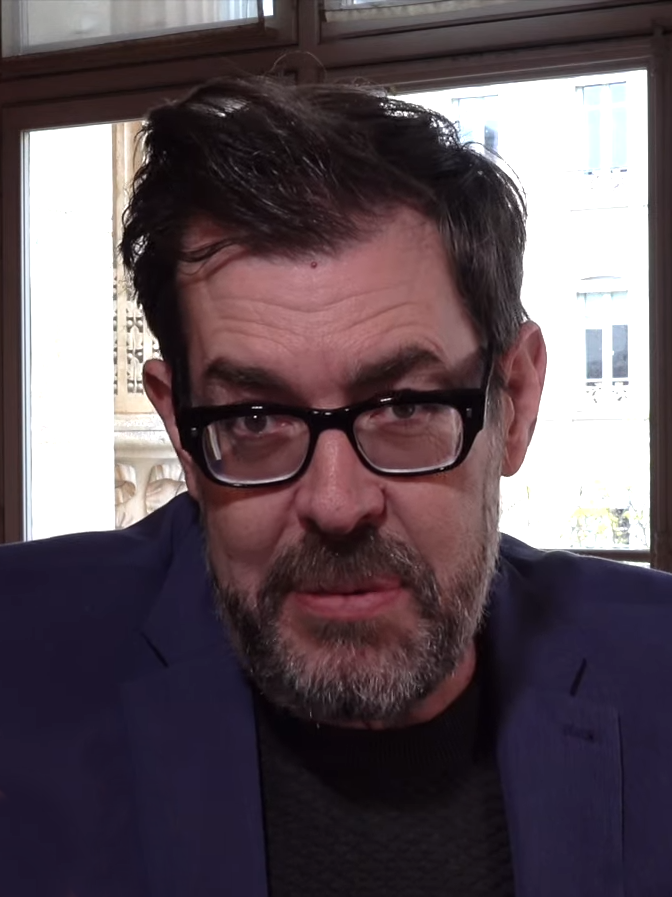
The regular series was presented by the duo of Alexander Armstrong (left) and Richard Osman (right), from its inception until Osman left the show in 2022.

The show was originally to be called Obviously and was conceived by Tom Blakeson, Simon Craig, David Flynn, Nick Mather, Richard Osman and Shaun Parry, producers at Endemol UK, in 2009. They envisaged it as a "reverse Family Fortunes ... rewarding obscure knowledge, while allowing people to also give obvious answers ... a quiz which could be sort of highbrow and populist simultaneously".

Osman was not intended to be co-presenter; originally, he filled the role only as part of a demonstration laid on for the BBC. BBC executives asked him to continue when they commissioned the first series. Osman then approached comedian Alexander Armstrong to be the main presenter; the two men had been peers during their university days. Armstrong, who the previous year had been lined up to present Channel 4's Countdown only to back out for fear of being pigeonholed as a presenter, agreed to present what was perceived as a lower-profile show, with the presence of Osman helping to convince him.

In 2016, Osman told the Belfast Telegraph that "It's never been a show that's had posters, or trailers, and it's presented by these two slightly inept guys. Everyone who's ever watched it feels like it's their programme. We've never changed it, but have always done it in the same way, which is slightly shoddy, enjoying ourselves." On the programme's future, he said, "Every programme has a shelf-life, but as long as people are enjoying it, we will stick with it. If Channel 4 wanted to offer three times as much money, we wouldn't take it. We would stay with the BBC. We love the BBC. Pointless is not for sale. We owe the BBC an enormous debt, because they've looked after us."

After Series 27, Osman retired from the regular series (remaining as co-presenter on Pointless Celebrities) and for series 28 was replaced by presenters: Sally Lindsay, Stephen Mangan, Lauren Laverne, Konnie Huq and Alex Brooker. Series 29 added Ed Gamble, Rose Matafeo, Ria Lina, Lucy Porter and Gyles Brandreth. Series 30 added Nish Kumar, Andi Oliver, Sally Phillips and Vick Hope. Series 31 added Hugh Dennis, Anita Rani, Gabby Logan, Josh Widdicombe and Desiree Burch. Series 32 added Chris Ramsey, Gok Wan, Rob Rinder, and Ellie Taylor. Series 33 added Liza Tarbuck, Phil Wang and Mel Giedroyc. Series 34 added Angela Rippon, Trevor Nelson, Judi Love, Gethin Jones, and Tom Allen. Series 35 added Angela Scanlon, Susan Wokoma, and saw the return of Gok Wan, Nish Kumar, and Lucy Porter. Series 36 added Michael Ball, Ben Miller, Sara Pascoe, and Clare Balding.

== Gameplay ==
Teams of two contestants attempt to provide answers that are not only correct, but also as obscure as possible. The programme initially featured five teams per episode, but the field was later reduced to four. On each episode, contestants answer a series of questions that were put to 100 members of the general public in a previously conducted online survey, which had a time limit of 100 seconds. Once a question is asked at the start of a round, the contestants are given details as to what constitutes a valid answer. If a team's answer is correct, they score one point for each participant who gave it during the survey; an answer given by none of the participants is termed "pointless" and adds nothing to the team's score. Incorrect answers score the maximum of 100 points. Once a question or pass is complete, depending on the specific format of the round, the lowest- and highest-scoring answers given in the survey are stated, usually the top three.

The game begins with two Elimination Rounds, in which teams must achieve as low a score as possible. The rounds are scored independently of one another, and the team with the highest score in each round is eliminated from the game. The two surviving teams compete against each other in the "Head-to-Head" to find low-scoring answers; the first team to win two questions moves on to the Final to play for the jackpot.

Teams may return to the programme until they have either reached the Final once or been eliminated in three (two prior to series 25) consecutive episodes, whichever occurs first.

The jackpot increases by £250 for every pointless answer given in any round other than the Final. If a team reaches the Final but fails to win the jackpot, it is rolled over to the next episode and increased by £1,000. As of May 2022 the highest recorded jackpot won on the show was £24,750 on 8 March 2013. Once the jackpot is won, the amount is reset to £1,000.

Contestants who are deaf or hard of hearing are allowed the use of an interpreter, who may translate between spoken words and sign language as needed. The interpreter may not suggest answers or take any other active role in the game.

=== Elimination Rounds ===
During an Elimination Round, teams aim to score as few points as possible. Each round consists of a question derived from a subject with each member of a team required to give an answer during a pass; each round consists of two passes and teams must decide who will play which pass before the question is asked. Teammates may not confer on answers during the round. Order of play for the first pass is determined by random draw in Round 1 and by ascending order of first-round scores in Round 2. For the second pass in each round, the order of play is reversed.

After both passes are complete, the team with the highest score for the round is eliminated from the game. In the event of a tie for high score, the affected teams are allowed to confer and offer one more answer to the question as a tiebreaker; the order of answers given is identical to the first pass. If the scores remain tied after this pass, the question is thrown out and a new one is played.

Six different formats for the questions have been used during the programme's run for the elimination rounds in each game:

- Open-Ended – Contestants are given the question and have free choice of what answer to give. A modified version of this format is sometimes used in which the contestants must name items that belong to any of several sub-categories (e.g. given a list of acronyms, choose one and state the word represented by any one of its letters).
- Possible Answers – Introduced in Series 2, contestants are given a board of potential answers to a question and must each pick one, attempting to find the obscure ones on the board and avoid picking out a wrong answer. Each pass consists of two boards, each possessing at least one pointless answer and at least one incorrect answer, the latter usually having some indirect link (often humorous) with the question. This format allowed categories to be used in which no commonly agreed definitive list of correct answers might exist. It was discontinued following the end of Series 5.
- Clues and Answers – Introduced in Series 3, contestants are given a list of clues related to the topic of the question, whereupon they must select a clue and provide the correct answer connected to it. An example of this format is that a list could contain the names of different battles and the question requires a contestant to name the country in which it occurred (e.g., "the Battle of Hastings" – "England"). Although the round follows a similar style to that of the "Possible Answers" format, there is no guarantee that contestants may find a pointless answer from within the list. If a team answers incorrectly, that clue remains in play and can be chosen again. The number of clue/answer pairs is always three more than the number of teams playing a round, and a new board is used on each pass.
- Linked Categories – Introduced in Series 5, each pass consists of two closely related categories; one team member provides an answer related to the first category while the other provides an answer to the second category. The format follows the same principles as that of the "Open-ended" format, but was rarely used and was later discontinued after the series.
- Picture Board – Introduced in Series 7, contestants are shown a grid of pictures or items and must identify one at a time. In some cases, the pictures have some of the letters in their correct answers filled in and/or serve as clues to items that must be named. Depending on the rules of the particular board, contestants might have to state which picture they are identifying.
- Part Identification – Introduced in Series 24, contestants are shown seven items and four groups into which they must be sorted (e.g. given a list of seven parts of the human head, decide whether each is found in the brain, ear, eye, or mouth). Each contestant selects one item and must identify the group to which it belongs. As in "Clues and Answers," a new board is played on each pass, and an incorrect guess leaves that item available to opponents.

As of Series 25, the most common format for the elimination rounds involves "Clues and Answers" for one and either "Open-Ended" or "Picture Board" for the other. For all formats except "Open-Ended" and "Picture Board", the last contestant or team to play on a particular board is invited to answer as many remaining items as they wish before selecting one to use on that turn.

=== Head-to-Head ===
The two remaining teams compete against each other, answering questions with the intention of finding the lowest scores possible. Both teams can now confer and the winning team of this round moves on to the Final. The format of this round has differed, as listed below:

- Series 1 – The teams take turns providing one answer to a question at a time and attempting to score as few points as possible. The lower-scoring team from the elimination rounds chooses one of two categories to be played. Each team is given an equal number of turns; if at least one team has exceeded 100 at the end of a pass, the round ends and the lower-scoring team wins.
- Series 2 to 5 – Both teams compete in a multi-question best-of contest; best-of-five in Series 2 and best-of-three from Series 3. Each team must give an answer to a question and once both have done so, the lower score of the two wins the question and earns that team a point. Each question will usually have a minimum of four answers to choose from and the order of play is that the team who acquired the fewest points in the elimination rounds gets to answer first on the first question.
- As of Series 6 – Both teams compete in a multi-question best-of-three contest; while the format is the same since Series 3, all questions have five answers with each team choosing one. Questions follow one of three formats: Picture Board (occasionally using sound cues or with some letters of the correct answer filled in); Clues and Answers; or answers that have been scrambled/anagrammed or had some of their letters removed. Both teams may choose the same item if the second team to play believes that the first has answered incorrectly. The second team is invited to fill in as many missing answers as they can before choosing one.

Midway through Series 23, a new round was added to give the contestants more opportunities to increase the jackpot. It is played between the second elimination round and the head-to-head and is similar to the previously retired "Possible Answers" format. The contestants are shown a question and six possible answers - two of which are pointless while two are incorrect, often with a tangential or humorous link to the question. Each pair may offer one answer with no risk of elimination and all four contestants may confer with one another if desired. Any chosen pointless answers add £250 to the jackpot.

=== Final ===
The last remaining team receives a pair of trophies to keep regardless of what happens in the Final and now attempts to win the game's jackpot. The team chooses one category from a list, whereupon the host reads a series of questions associated with it that have multiple correct answers (e.g. characters in the play King Lear or films starring Emily Watson). The contestants may take up to 60 seconds to discuss the questions, after which they must jointly give three answers. If any individual answer is pointless, the team wins the jackpot; otherwise it rolls over to the next episode.

Originally, contestants could choose from one of three categories, with unused ones remaining in the list for five days or until they were selected, and had to provide answers to a single question within the chosen category. This format was used between Series 1 and Series 5. The number of available categories was increased to five at the start of Series 6, then reduced to four in Series 9. By the start of the second half of Series 9, the round was modified to require the contestants to provide answers to any or all of three questions connected to their chosen category. They must specify which question they are attempting with each of their three answers and can only win the jackpot if any answer is pointless for its nominated question. As of Series 29, the contestants are presented with two questions in their chosen category and can win an additional £500 by giving three pointless answers.

== Pointless Celebrities ==
Following the success of Pointless and its transfer to BBC One, the BBC commissioned a celebrity edition of the programme, entitled Pointless Celebrities. Much like the main show, Pointless Celebrities has teams of two celebrities competing against each other to win the jackpot for their chosen charities and has the same gameplay as the regular show.

Unlike the regular version, the jackpot does not roll over and always starts at £2,500 with every pointless answer adding £250 to the jackpot, but this may be doubled on some occasions. £500 is donated to every team who do not win the jackpot and any money won by a team is split equally between the two charities represented by its members.

Pointless Celebrities was broadcast within a prime-time slot on Saturday nights and featured some differences in how the game worked. Celebrities were allowed to return in more than one episode with the same partner or a different partner and episodes tended to have a theme in regards to the celebrity contestants that took part – for example, a celebrity edition aired in December 2015 consisted of celebrities who were made famous on reality television shows like Big Brother and Made in Chelsea. Some editions of the show end with a guest performance.

Pointless Celebrities was axed in 2022, at the same time as Osman had announced he was ceasing his involvement in the show. However, the news confirming the show would not be renewed was only revealed after a four-year backlog of episodes had been exhausted, this news being revealed on 28 May 2026.

== Transmissions ==
=== Regular ===
Series	Start date	End date	Episodes	Notes
1	24 August 2009	6 October 2009	30	Series 1 took breaks on: 31 August and 10 September.
2	8 March 2010	16 April 2010	30	Series 2 did not take any breaks.
3	30 August 2010	22 December 2010	50	Episode 50 was a celebrity special. Series 3 took breaks on: 4 to 14 October and 22 November to 21 December.
4	14 March 2011	26 August 2011	60	This was the first series to be broadcast on BBC One. Series 4 took a breaks from 18 April to 8 July.
5	29 August 2011	6 February 2012	60	Series 5 took a break from 17 October 2011 to 2 January 2012.
6	13 February 2012	24 August 2012	70	Series 6 took breaks on: 23 March (pre‑empted for Sport Relief), 2 to 27 April, 3 May (an election day in the UK), and 4 June to 10 August.
7	29 August 2012	5 December 2012	70	Series 7 aired without breaks, but on 16 November a Children in Need special with celebrities was aired. In episode 60 a couple's answer was considered as incorrect even though their answer could be classified as a synonym of the correct answer. As a result, the BBC did not repeat this episode in 2014 and jumped from episode 59 to 61 without any announcement. However, as a massive jackpot of £20,250 was won in episode 60, viewers noticed the missing episode immediately and the BBC received more than 1,000 complaints.
8	2 January 2013	2 April 2013	65	Series 8 did not take any breaks. This series featured the episode where the highest jackpot was won (£24,750). At the time, there was only one category for the final round. This was changed to three categories the contestants could pick from shortly after this series aired.
9	3 April 2013	25 September 2013	55	Series 9 took breaks on: 29 April to 24 May and 24 June to 30 August.
10	26 September 2013	19 March 2014	70	Series 10 took breaks on: 7 to 25 October, 2 December 2013 to 3 January 2014 and 3 to 21 February 2014.
11	20 March 2014	29 September 2014	55	Series 11 took breaks on: 21 April to 23 May and 19 June to 5 September.
12	28 October 2014	25 February 2015	55	Series 12 took a break from 20 November 2014 to 2 January 2015.
13	23 March 2015	28 July 2015	51	Series 13 took breaks on: 13 April to 3 May, 25 May to 11 June, and 25 June to 10 July.
14	29 July 2015	29 February 2016	55	Series 14 took breaks on: 3 August to 4 September 2015, 30 September to 23 October 2015, 17 November 2015 to 1 January 2016, and 27 January to 26 February 2016.
15	1 March 2016	20 September 2016	55	Series 15 took breaks on: 21 March to 19 April and 24 May to 26 August. Due to that second break, one episode with a terminally ill contestant was postponed until September. Upon hearing the contestant would not live long enough to see the episode, the show sent her a DVD with the episode.
16	24 October 2016	15 March 2017	55	Episode 36 marked the 1000th episode of Pointless. For this occasion, Armstrong and Osman swapped roles. Series 16 took breaks on: 21 November to 9 December, 15 to 28 December 2016, and 24 January to 23 February 2017.
17	19 April 2017	29 September 2017	55	Series 17 took a break from 7 June to 1 September.
18	2 October 2017	12 February 2018	55	Series 18 took a break from 6 November 2017 to 1 January 2018.
19	2 April 2018	15 June 2018	55	Series 19 did not take any breaks.
20	19 June 2018	25 January 2019	55	Series 20 took breaks on: 20 June to 31 August, 19 October to 27 December 2018 and on 1 January 2019.
21	28 January 2019	29 May 2019	55	Series 21 took a break from 13 February to 29 March.
22	2 September 2019	6 April 2020	55	Series 22 took breaks on: 16 October 2019 to 1 January 2020 and 27 January to 27 March.
23	7 April 2020	6 October 2020	55	Series 23 took breaks on: 20 April to 25 June and 30 July to 4 September.
24	7 October 2020	22 February 2021	55	Series 24 took a break from 3 November 2020 to 1 January 2021.
25	6 April 2021	20 July 2021	55	Series 25 took a break from 14 June to 9 July.
26	21 July 2021	14 March 2022	55	Series 26 took breaks on: 26 July to 3 September 2021, 28 October 2021 to 3 January 2022, and 20 January to 11 March.
27	15 March 2022	20 July 2022	55	This was the final series with Richard Osman as co‑host. Series 27 took breaks on: 18 April to 20 May and 27 June to 11 July.
28	20 September 2022	21 February 2023	55	This series started later than originally planned due to the death of Queen Elizabeth II. This was the first series without Richard Osman and instead featured guest co‑hosts, starting with Sally Lindsay (episodes 1–11) Other co‑hosts were: Stephen Mangan (12–22), Lauren Laverne (23–33), Konnie Huq (34–44), and Alex Brooker (45–55). Series 28 took a break from 4 November 2022 to 23 January 2023.
29	3 April 2023	30 August 2023	54	Co‑hosts: Ed Gamble (1–10), Rose Matafeo (11–21), Ria Lina (22–32), Lucy Porter (33–43), and Gyles Brandreth (44–54). Series 29 took breaks on: 8 to 26 May and 7 June to 31 July.
30	31 August 2023	2 April 2024	55	Co‑hosts: Stephen Mangan (1–4), Konnie Huq (5–8), Ria Lina (9–12), Nish Kumar (13–23), Andi Oliver (24–34), Sally Phillips (35–45), and Vick Hope (46–55). Series 30 took breaks on: 15 September to 27 October 2023, 27 November 2023 to 5 January 2024, and 7 February to 29 March.
31	3 April 2024	28 August 2024	48	Co‑hosts: Hugh Dennis (1–11), Anita Rani (12–22), Gabby Logan (23–33), Josh Widdicombe (34–44), and Desiree Burch (45–48). Series 31 took a break from 29 May to 19 August.
32	29 August 2024	4 February 2025	49	Co‑hosts: Desiree Burch (1–7), Chris Ramsey (8–18), Gok Wan (19–29), Rob Rinder (30–40), and Ellie Taylor (41–49). Series 32 took a break from 7 October 2024 to 6 January 2025.
33	5 February 2025	19 September 2025	48	Co‑hosts: Ellie Taylor (1–2), Liza Tarbuck (3–13), Phil Wang (14–24), Mel Giedroyc (25–35), Anita Rani (36–39), Ria Lina (40–43), and Stephen Mangan (44–48). Series 33 took breaks on: 22 February to 24 March and from 29 April to 5 September. Series 33 had 48 episodes (not 55 as originally scheduled) and series 34 episode 1 followed directly after series 33 episode 48.
34	22 September 2025	7 April 2026	46	Co‑hosts: Angela Rippon (1–11), Trevor Nelson (12–22), Judi Love (23–33), Gethin Jones (34–44), and Tom Allen (45–46). Series 34 took breaks on: 27 October 2025 to 5 January 2026, from 19 January to 5 February, and from 18 February to 2 April.
35	8 April 2026	17 September 2026	47	Co‑hosts: Tom Allen (1–9), Angela Scanlon (10–24), Susan Wokoma (25–38), Gok Wan (39–41), Nish Kumar (42–45), and Lucy Porter (46–47). Series 35 took a break from 25 May to 28 August.
36	18 September 2026	TBA	46	Co‑hosts: Lucy Porter (1–2), and Michael Ball (from episode 3). Series 36 is taking a break from 9 October 2026.

==== Co-hosts ====
Up to series 36 episode 15 on 8 October 2026.

Co-Host	Episodes	S 28	S 29	S 30	S 31	S 32	S 33	S 34	S 35	S 36
Sally Lindsay	11	11								
Stephen Mangan	20	11		4			5			
Lauren Laverne	11	11								
Konnie Huq	15	11		4						
Alex Brooker	11	11								
Ed Gamble	10		10							
Rose Matafeo	11		11							
Ria Lina	19		11	4			4			
Lucy Porter	15		11						2	2
Gyles Brandreth	11		11							
Nish Kumar	15			11					4	
Andi Oliver	11			11						
Sally Phillips	11			11						
Vick Hope	10			10						
Hugh Dennis	11				11					
Anita Rani	15				11		4			
Gabby Logan	11				11					
Josh Widdicombe	11				11					
Desiree Burch	11				4	7				
Chris Ramsey	11					11				
Gok Wan	14					11			3	
Rob Rinder	11					11				
Ellie Taylor	11					9	2			
Liza Tarbuck	11						11			
Phil Wang	11						11			
Mel Giedroyc	11						11			
Angela Rippon	11							11		
Trevor Nelson	11							11		
Judi Love	11							11		
Gethin Jones	11							11		
Tom Allen	11							2	9	
Angela Scanlon	15								15	
Susan Wokoma	14								14	
Michael Ball	13									13
Total	417	55	54	55	48	49	48	46	47	15

=== Celebrity ===
Series	Start date	End date	Episodes	Notes
1	4 July 2011	8 July 2011	5	Daily at 5:15 pm. Series 1 did not take any breaks.
2	25 February 2012	16 June 2012	8	On selected dates across four months.
3	20 October 2012	27 December 2012	10	Weekly on Saturday evenings at 5:40. Episode 9 was first broadcast on a Thursday due to Christmas schedules.
4	16 February 2013	7 September 2013	6	On selected dates. Episodes 1 to 5 were specials with contestants from a specific field: sports, Doctor Who, sitcoms, radio and top chefs.
5	26 October 2013	30 November 2013	10	On Saturdays at selected times. In the first episode of this series, Richard Osman set a new Guinness World Record by naming at least 30 countries, identified by their capital cities in 60 seconds.
6	21 December 2013	3 January 2015	32	On Saturdays at selected times. The series took a break midway through.
7	11 April 2015	26 September 2015	7	On Saturdays at selected times.
8	29 August 2015	30 January 2016	18	On Saturdays at selected times.
9	9 January 2016	3 September 2016	8	On Saturdays at selected times.
10	14 May 2016	31 March 2018	45	On Saturdays at selected times.
11	23 December 2017	1 June 2019	39	On Saturdays at selected times.
12	31 August 2019	14 March 2020	23	On Saturdays at selected times.
13	25 April 2020	5 June 2021	31	On Saturdays at selected times.
14	23 December 2020	22 December 2021	32	On Saturdays at selected times.
15	2 April 2022	5 August 2023	31	On Saturdays at selected times. The first episode was brought forward in tribute to the recently deceased Tom Parker from The Wanted, with the blessing of Parker's family.
16	26 November 2022	20 April 2024	20	On Saturdays at selected times. First series recorded without the dividers between celebrities after COVID restrictions. Apart from the 26 November episode (BBC Centenary Special) and the 2022 Christmas special, all other episodes aired in 2023 and 2024.
17	11 March 2023	16 August 2025	22	On Saturdays at selected times. The only episodes to have aired in 2023 were 'Comedy' (11 March) and "Eurovision 2023" (13 May, before the Eurovision final). Only two new episodes aired in 2024 (27 April and 4 May 2024). The 17th series continued on 4 January 2025 (episode 5: Sports Special). This series also featured the 2,000th episode of Pointless, which included "the special contestant line up; they are all the greatest players of all time."

=== Pointless Celebrities: Daytime ===
Series	Start date	End date	Episodes	Notes
1	10 December 2012	21 December 2012	10	Ten episodes with celebrities shown at the time of regular Pointless (weekdays at 5:15 pm). Made for the Christmas season of 2012.

=== Specials ===
Title	First Broadcast
500th Episode	6 June 2013
1,000th Episode	16 January 2017
"The Good, the Bad and the Bloopers"	23 March 2019
2,000th Episode	2 August 2025

== Broadcast and ratings ==
Series 1 aired on BBC Two between August and October 2009 with the corporation announcing on the day of the final episode's broadcast that it had commissioned Series 2. The series' audience had peaked at 1.69 million viewers; 17.2% of audience share for the timeslot, while averaging around 1 million viewers per episode. Series 2 saw audiences grow modestly; the format was tweaked prior to the start of Series 3, reducing the number of rounds and giving more time for banter between the hosts which had previously been edited out. The change saw strong viewer growth and the show was moved to the BBC's main channel BBC One in 2011. By 2013, the programme was recording four episodes in one day and averaged 3.6 million viewers daily, gaining more viewers than ITV game show The Chase, which airs in roughly the same time slot.

In February 2014, Pointless was extended for another 204 episodes, giving three more series, taking the total commissioned to 13 in February 2014. A further 24 celebrity specials were also ordered. For the 1,000th episode, Alexander Armstrong and Richard Osman traded host and assistant duties and four previous couples who had distinguished themselves in various ways were invited to compete again. The jackpot for this episode began at £2,500 (the usual starting value for Pointless Celebrities) and every pointless answer during the main game added £1,000 to it. On 23 February 2016, it was announced that the show had been recommissioned by the BBC to make 165 more Regular daytime editions along with 45 prime-time Celebrity Specials taking Pointless to the end of 2017. On 4 September 2017, it was announced that the BBC had commissioned a further 204 episodes including 165 regular and 39 celebrity specials.

With the start of Series 11 of Pointless Celebrities, the show's set design was changed with some new graphics and an updated intro replaced the one used since the show's debut; this extended to Series 19 of Regular Pointless.

== International broadcast ==
In Australia, Pointless has aired on both BBC UKTV (series 10 and 11) and ABC (series 9–11). As of 28 May 2025, it is aired on the Nine Network at 2pm on weekdays.

In South Africa, Pointless airs on BBC BRIT on the African satellite television provider, DStv.

== Awards and nominations ==
Year	Award	Category	Result
2012	National Television Awards	Comedy Panel Show	Longlisted
2012	TV Choice Awards	Best Daytime Show	Nominated
2013	National Television Awards	Most Popular Daytime Programme	Longlisted
2014	National Television Awards	Most Popular Daytime Programme	Nominated
2015	National Television Awards	Most Popular Daytime Programme	Nominated
2015	The Television and Radio Industries Club Awards	Daytime Programme	Won
2016	National Television Awards	Most Popular Daytime Programme	Nominated

== International versions ==
Legend: Currently airing No longer airing

Country	Local title	Channel	Presenter	Assistant	Premiere date	End date
Australia	Pointless	Network Ten	Mark Humphries	Andrew Rochford	23 July 2018	10 May 2019
Czech Republic	Míň je víc! (Less Is More!)	ČT1	Jan Smetana	—N/a	5 January 2015	17 December 2015
Croatia	Tog se nitko nije sjetio (No one thought of that)	RTL	Antonija Blaće	Krešimir Sučević-Međeral	29 April 2013	20 July 2015
Denmark	Jo færre, jo bedre (The fewer, the better)	TV2	Steen Langeberg	Marie Tangaa (2019–2025); Freja Lind (2025–present)	6 January 2019	present
France	Personne n'y avait pensé ! (No one had thought of it!)	France 3	Cyril Féraud	—N/a	16 July 2011	22 January 2021
Germany	Null gewinnt (Zero wins)	Das Erste	Dieter Nuhr	Ralph Caspers	20 July 2012	1 March 2013
Italy	Zero e lode! (Zero cum laude!)	Rai 1	Alessandro Greco	Francesco Lancia	11 September 2017	1 June 2018
North Macedonia	Без Поени! Bez Poeni! (No Points!)	Sitel	Snezana Velkov	—N/a	1 November 2014	7 March 2015
Netherlands	Pointless	NPO 1	Lucille Werner	Owen Schumacher	27 July 2015	28 August 2015
Poland	Tylko Ty! (Only you)	TVP2	Tomasz Kammel	Radosław Kotarski	27 February 2014	30 May 2014
Serbia	Toga se niko nije setio (No one thought of that)	Prva	Tamara Grujić	Dragan Ilić	5 April 2014	11 May 2014
Switzerland	Weniger ist mehr (Less is more)	SRF1	Patrick Hässig	—N/a	20 August 2012	12 September 2014

An American version was set to be developed by GSN in 2017. A pilot episode presented by Alison Sweeney with Doug Mirabello as her assistant was produced by Endemol Shine America but never aired.

== Merchandise ==
=== App games ===
On 26 February 2014, Endemol's in-house app-publishing division released the official Pointless app, Pointless Quiz, was released for iOS, with an iPad, Android and an Amazon version released a few months later. The Pointless app features animated versions of Alexander Armstrong and Richard Osman, and allows the player to tackle questions in a similar format to the TV show.

In October 2018, Vocala released an Amazon Alexa Skill based on the show.

=== Books ===
Five books have been released of the show: The 100 Most Pointless Things in the World, The 100 Most Pointless Arguments in the World, The Very Pointless Quiz Book (not to be mistaken for The Pointless Book), The A-Z of Pointless: A brain-teasing bumper book of questions and trivia and A Pointless History of the World. All five were released by Coronet. In the books, Armstrong and Osman give their insight into pointless matters.

=== Board games ===
Three editions of the official board game have been published by University Games, as well as two mini-sized versions, each of which contains updated questions.

== In popular culture ==
Pointless appeared in the BBC sitcom Not Going Out (Series 7, Episode 5); Armstrong and Osman both played themselves. Pointless was also parodied in several sketches of the satirical show Newzoids, in which a caricature of Osman interrupts people in regular situations with phrases used in the game show.
