= Zero e lode! =

- Genre: Game show
- Directed by: Claudia De Toma
- Presented by: Alessandro Greco; Stefano Santucci (episodes 1-5) Francesco Lancia (episodes 6-25, 27-177); Alessandro Migliaccio (episode 26)
- Country of origin: Italy
- Original language: Italian
- No. of episodes: 177

Production
- Production location: Naples
- Running time: 75 minutes approx including commercials
- Production companies: Rai and Endemol Shine Italy

Original release
- Network: Rai 1
- Release: 11 September 2017 – 1 June 2018

Zero e lode! (literally "Zero cum laude!") is an Italian game show adapted from the BBC's Pointless. The show was presented by Alessandro Greco and aired on Rai 1 from 11 September 2017 to 1 June 2018.

== Format ==
Zero e lode! follows the same format as its British original. There are four competing duos. All questions have been given to a hundred members of the public before broadcast, and competitors seek to give the answers that the fewest of them knew. For example, the first question on the first episode was fields of data on the Italian identity card. "Eye colour" scored 56 points, "Identifying signs" scored 39 and "Civil status" 40. "State" was a wrong answer worth 100 points, while pointless answers worth zero points included "Mayor (or delegate) signature". The duo with the highest score is eliminated.

Once there are only two duos remaining, they compete in a head-to-head until one duo has won on three questions. This duo then plays for €10,000 if they can find a pointless answer for the final question. In the first episode, the question was characters from the 1975 film Fantozzi. As they did not win, the money rolled over and the next day the jackpot was €11,000.

The record jackpot was on 24 May 2018, when €49,000 was shared between a duo who found a pointless answer for words in the dictionary between pesca and pesco, namely pesciera (fish bowl).

== History ==
The show was announced in August 2017 to begin on 11 September, at 2 pm. The show debuted with an 11.37% audience share for its unattractive broadcast time, but this fell to 9% as audiences complained of not understanding the rules. After a week of celebrity specials, the audience reached a new record of 11.48% (1.597 million people) on 26 October. The audience rose to 12-13% during a telethon week in December.

The final episode of the season aired on 1 June 2018, with Greco visibly moved by the experience. Days later, the show was not renewed for a second season. Greco said that he did well to increase the show's ratings, as it had feared cancellation by Christmas and the initial plan was for it to end in March. The official explanation by Rai for the cancellation was that the audience was too male and changed the channel afterwards instead of staying to watch Vita in diretta, a talk show with a largely female audience.
