= Xenophon Kyriakou =

Greek businessman (born 1972)

- Born: 7 February 1972 (age 54)
- Title: CEO of Athenian Sea Carriers
- Parent: Minos Kyriakou
- Relatives: Theodore Kyriakou (brother)

Xenophon Kyriakou is a Greek businessman.

Xenophon Kyriakou is the eldest son of Minos Kyriakou and his first wife.

Kyriakou runs Athenian Sea Carriers, the shipping company owned by his father.

He is a director of the Kyriakou Group and Athenian Capital Holdings.
