= Kiss TV (Romania) =

- Country: Romania
- Broadcast area: National; also distributed in Moldova

Programming
- Picture format: 576i (16:9 SDTV)

Ownership
- Owner: Antenna Group

History
- Launched: 9 November 2006; 19 years ago

Links
- Website: www.kisstv.ro

Kiss TV is a music television station located in Bucharest owned by Antenna Group.

== History ==
At the beginning of 2014, Kiss TV was entirely taken over by the Greek media company Antenna Group, following the withdrawal of ProSiebenSat.1 Media, the old owner of Kiss TV from 2006 till 2013.

== Fresh Top 40 ==
Fresh Top 40 is the music chart presented by Kiss TV. The chart is weekly and is voted by viewers, on Kiss TV's site. Kiss TV begun producing the chart in late 2006. So far, the songs which spent the most weeks at number one are: "Disturbia", by Rihanna; "In and Out of Love", by Armin van Buuren; "Poker Face", by Lady Gaga; and "Amazing", by Inna. The current number-one single is "Locul Potrivit" by Guess Who.

The show was closed in 2009, but started again in 2014. Now is hosted by Andreea Berghea, (Voice over).

== Distribution ==
Satellite broadcasting via Intelsat 12 (45°E) stopped in June 2017 and was switched together with Prima TV to Intelsat 33e (60°E).
