= ANT1 Pacific =

- Country: Greece
- Broadcast area: Australia

Programming
- Language: Greek
- Picture format: 4:3 (576i, SDTV)

Ownership
- Owner: Antenna Group

History
- Launched: 1996

Links
- Website: antennapacific.gr

ANT1 Pacific (pronounced Antenna) is a subscription TV channel established in 1997. The channel is partly owned by ANT1 Greece. It is a general entertainment channel screening international, Greek and some locally produced programs.

The channel started broadcasting in November 1996 on the Optus Vision platform. The channel does not produce local content; in 2002, Optus and Foxtel merged their pay-TV services and Optus subscribers would lose Alpha-GATV due to capacity issues, a move which received criticism from the Greek Australian community, as Alpha-GATV produced a substantial amount of local programming.
