= Toga se niko nije setio =

- Genre: Game show
- Presented by: Tamara Grujić
- Starring: Dragan Ilić
- Theme music composer: Marc Sylvan
- Country of origin: Serbia
- Original language: Serbian
- No. of series: 1
- No. of episodes: 12

Production
- Camera setup: Multiple-camera setup
- Running time: 45 minutes

Original release
- Network: Prva
- Release: April 5 – May 11, 2014

Toga se niko nije setio (Serbian Cyrillic: Тога се нико није сетио; translation: No one thought of that) is a quiz show produced by Prva Srpska Televizija. The show is unique because it tasks players with finding obscure answers to questions and trying to obtain a low score. It started airing on April 5, 2014. The show is the local version of Pointless, produced by Endemol UK.

== Overview ==
Toga se niko nije setio is a quiz show in which players are tasked with not only finding correct answers, but finding the most obscure answers among them. The game features four teams, each consisting of two players. Players must try and survive being eliminated by obtaining the lowest score and make it to the final round for a chance to win the jackpot prize. Teams can appear on the show up to two times, the exception being if they have made it to the final round on their first attempt.
Prior to the show, 100 people are each given 100 seconds to give as many answers as they can to the questions that will be asked to the teams during the show. Correct answers are assigned a point value equal to the number of panelists who gave them, so that less commonly given answers have lower values than those given by many panelists. Incorrect answers incur a penalty of 100 points. Players on the show attempt to give answers worth as few points as possible, aiming to have the lowest score amongst the players in each round.

=== Celebrity edition ===
First two episodes were celebrity editions. First winners were actors Aleksandar Radojičić and Viktor Savić, who donated 60,000 RSD to the "Boško Buha" theater.

=== Prize ===
The winner gets 20,000 RSD. The jackpot prize is 50,000 RSD, but when someone guesses the "pointless answer", 5000 RSD are added to the jackpot.
First jackpot winners were Aleksandar Radojičić and Viktor Savić, who won 60,000 RSD for charity.

If the jackpot is not won in one episode, it goes to the next one, so the next jackpot will be 50,000 RSD, plus jackpot from previous episode.

Largest jackpot was won on April 26, 2014, by Dragan & Branka. The jackpot prize was 170,000 RSD.

== Seasons ==
Season	Start date	End date	Episodes	Notes
1	April 5, 2014	May 11, 2014	12	First two episodes were celebrity editions

=== Season 1 ===
Celebrity edition
Jackpot winners

Episode	Date	Winners
Episode 1	April 5, 2014	Aleksandar Radojičić & Viktor Savić
Episode 2	April 6, 2014	Aleksandra Gudelj & Ivana Tasić
Episode 3	April 12, 2014	Jovan & Žarko
Episode 4	April 13, 2014	Vesna & Darko
Episode 5	April 19, 2014	Miodrag & Isidora
Episode 6	April 20, 2014	Vlastimir & Darko
Episode 7	April 26, 2014	Dragan & Branka
Episode 8	April 27, 2014	Vladimir & Marina
Episode 9	May 3, 2014	Dragan & Marko
Episode 10	May 4, 2014	Zoran & Aleksandra
Episode 11	May 10, 2014	Marko & Isidora
Episode 12	May 11, 2014	Damir & Dejan
