= Prva Plus =

Serbian television channel

- Country: Serbia
- Headquarters: Belgrade

Programming
- Picture format: 16:9

Ownership
- Owner: Antenna Group
- Sister channels: O2.TV; Prva; Prva World

History
- Launched: 14 October 2013

Links
- Website: www.prvaplus.prva.rs

Prva Plus is a Serbian cable television channel owned by Antenna Group.

== Programmings ==
=== Series and miniseries ===
- 2 Broke Girls (Dve devojke bez love)
- Betty White's Off Their Rockers (Beti Vajt i otkačeni matorci)
- Budva na pjenu od mora
- Scream Queens (2015 TV series) (Kraljice Vriska)
- Cold Case (Zločini iz prošlosti)
- Criminal Minds (Zločinački umovi)
- Crni Gruja
- Friends (Prijatelji)
- Gilmore Girls (Gilmorove)
- Gossip Girl (Tračara)
- Hart of Dixie (Južnjačko srce)
- Human Target (Živa meta)
- La Femme Nikita (Nikita)
- Lasko – Die Faust Gottes (Lasko – božja pesnica)
- Lilyhammer (Lilihamer)
- Lipstick Jungle (Štiklama do vrha)
- Lost (Izgubljeni)
- My So-Called Life (Moj takozvani život)
- Nadrealna televizija
- Nikita (Nikita)
- Otvorena vrata
- Person of Interest (Stalna meta)
- Pevaj, brate!
- Revolution (Revolucija)
- Royal Pains (Privatni doktor)
- The Following (Sledbenici)
- The O.C. (Okrug Orindž)
- The Vampire Diaries (Vampirski dnevnici)
- Two and a Half Men (Dva i po muškarca)
- Without a Trace (Bez traga)

=== Animated series ===
- Shaun the Sheep (Ovčica Šone)
- The Flintstone Comedy Show (Kremenkov šou)
- The Flintstone Kids (Kremenčići)
- The Tom and Jerry Show (Tom i Džeri šou)

=== TV and reality series/shows ===
- America's Funniest Home Videos (Najsmešniji kućni video)
- Dama bez blama (local version of Ladykracher)
- Dođi na večeru (local version of Come Dine with Me)
- Dosije
- Keš taksi (local version of Cash Cab)
- Moja mama kuva bolje od tvoje (local version of My Mom Cooks Better Than Yours)
- Moje novo JA (local version of Extreme Makeover)
- Paklena kuhinja (local version of Kitchen Nightmares)
- Prvi glas Srbije (local version of Rise or Fall)
- Radna akcija (local version of Extreme Makeover: Home Edition)
- Šatra (local version of Among the Gypsies)
- Spot Central (Najsmešnije reklame)
- The Amazing Race (Trka oko sveta)

=== Sports Programs ===
- Premier League
- Championship

== Logo ==
The logo has designed in October 2013, using the font for upper-case word "PRVA" of original Prva logo with thicker letters above upper-case word "PLUS". From 2013 to 2017, the logo was put into upper left corner of the screen. From 2017 onwards, the logo puts into upper right corner of the screen and has now dropped from upper left corner.
