= ANT1 Europe =

European subscription TV channel

- Country: Greece
- Broadcast area: Europe

Programming
- Language(s): Greek
- Picture format: 4:3 (576i, SDTV)

Ownership
- Owner: ANT1 Group

History
- Launched: 2006

Links
- Website: antennaeurope.gr

ANT1 Europe (pronounced "Antenna Europe") is a subscription TV channel established in 2006. The channel is partly owned by ANT1 Group. It is a general entertainment channel screening international, Greek and some locally produced programs.
