= Minos Kyriakou =

Greek businessman (1942–2017)

Minos "Minas" Kyriakou
- Born: Minos Xenophon Kyriakou; 31 May 1942; Poros, Greece
- Died: 2 July 2017 (aged 75); Athens, Greece
- Education: Columbia University
- Occupations: Owner, ANT1 Group; Chairman, Euroholdings Capital & Investment Corp; Owner, Athenian Sea Carriers Ltd; Owner, Bacoil International and Athenian Oil Trading Inc; President, Aegean Foundation
- Years active: 1975–2017
- Spouse: Mari Konstantatou (divorced)
- Children: Xenophon; Theodore; Athina

Minos Xenophon "Minas" Kyriakou (Greek: Μίνως (Μηνάς) Κυριακού, pronounced [ˌminos (miˌnas) ciriaˈku]; 31 May 1942 – 2 July 2017) was a Greek media and shipping magnate and businessman. He was the president of the Hellenic Olympic Committee and was the President of the International Olympic Academy (IOA, 2004-2009). He was elected to the International Association of Athletics Federations (IAAF) council in August 2003.

== Early life ==
Minos Kyriakou is the son of Xenophon Kyriacou and Athina Revidies. He was educated in France, Switzerland and at Columbia University in the US, from where he has a bachelor's degree.

== Career ==
Kyriakou was the founder and owner of ANT1 Group, a media company which owns most notably ANT1, one of the first private television channels in Greece.

He also owned the Greek multi-sports club Panellinios GS, and the Greek Basket League club Panellinios.

Kyriakou's links to the sporting world saw him later become president of the Greek Olympic Committee after Athens hosted the Olympic Games of 2004. He continued as president before stepping down in 2009.

== Problems with the law ==
Kyriakou owned four acres of land in Athens that are in violation of Areos Park, as some of the Panellinios Athens complexes are illegally on the premises of the Athens Municipality and the Athens Prefecture. In February 2007, a penalty of 48 months imprisonment without suspension, and a fine of €15,000 was placed on Kyriakou for the arbitrary construction of a cottage property in San Aimilianos in Porto Heli. Namely, the construction of a harbor that was in violation of not only the winter tide, but also the future expansion of the coastline. As a result of this, Kyriakou appealed the ruling of the court and he was then asked to pay a fee of €100,000 in financial security costs until the appeal trial could be held.

== Personal life ==
In December 2004, Kyriakou married the Greek actress Mari Konstantatou (b. 1971). They announced their divorce in March 2017.

He had two sons, Xenophon and Theodore, and a daughter, Athina, from his first marriage.

He spoke Greek, English, French, Italian, Spanish, Polish, and Russian. He was awarded the Golden Cross of the Legion of Honor – Republic of Poland, Golden Cross of the order of St. George, Golden Medal of Honor – Republic of Cyprus, Golden Star of Honor – Singapore Republic, Grand Cross of the Order of the Legion of Honor – Republic of Poland.

Kyriakou died of a heart attack on 2 July 2017, at the Athens Medical Center. He was twice divorced and was survived by his three children from his first marriage.
