= Antonis Kanakis =

Greek television host and actor

Antonis Kanakis (Greek: Αντώνης Κανάκης, born Antonios Doumas (Αντώνιος Δούμας); 18 February 1969) is a Greek television host and an actor. He was born in Thessaloniki but has worked for many years in Athens.

Kanakis is recognised as one of the principal participants in the satirical television programme A.M.A.N ta Katharmata, alongside Sotiris Kalivatsis and Giannis Servetas. He is now the key host of the parody show Radio Arvyla. He has also worked for the municipality-owned radio station of Thessaloniki, Kiss FM of Thessaloniki, ET3 channel, and Star Channel. Along with Radio Arvyla, it is the owner of the radio stations Imagine 89.7 (since 2007, ex. Studio 5), FLY 104 and Paidaki 97.5 (since 2023, ex. Easy FM and ANT1 Radio Thessaloniki).
