= Antenna Group =

Media company in Greece

Antenna Group BV
- Type: Privately held company
- Industry: Media
- Founded: 2 August 1989
- Headquarters: Marousi, Athens, Greece
- Key people: Theodore Kyriakou (Chairperson)
- Products: Broadcasting, Publishing, Telecommunications
- Revenue: ▲€563 million (2014)
- Net income: ▲€201 million (2014)
- Owner: Kyriakou Family
- Website: Antenna Group

Antenna Group (also known as ANT1 Group) is a media company in Greece and currently the largest Greek media company. It was established on 2 August 1989 by Minos Kyriakou. Following his tenure, the leadership passed to his son, Theodore Kyriakou, who currently serves as the group's chairperson.

The group's portfolio has diversified across several industries, including terrestrial and satellite broadcasting, radio, publishing, digital media, educational services, and telecommunications, as well as the music industry via a dedicated record label. The organization's primary asset is ANT1 TV, which was among the first private television networks to be licensed in Greece and remains one of the country's major broadcasters.

Antenna Group has extended its operations beyond the Greek domestic market by establishing international television feeds tailored for Greek audiences. The group currently operates broadcast services across North America, Europe, and Australasia. As part of its international infrastructure, Antenna Group maintains its North American headquarters in Midtown Manhattan, New York City. Furthermore, the group expanded its regional presence through the acquisition of ANT1 Cyprus, a dedicated feed serving the Cypriot market.

== History ==
Antenna TV S.A. was established on 2 August 1989 as the group's main unit, following the 1988 launch of Antenna 97.1 (now Easy 97.2).

At the end of that year, the group, through the aforementioned company, founded and launched the TV station of the same name, ANT1, one of Greece's first private networks and one of the highest rated for many years.

ANT1 Group expanded yet again, this time internationally launching ANT1 Satellite in 1993 and ANT1 Pacific in 1997. ANT1 Satellite was the first Greek network to broadcast to audiences in North America while ANT1 Pacific brought the 'best of' ANT1 TV to Australasia.

In subsequent years, ANT1 Group has expanded its business beyond the broadcasting world, including launching Audiotex (initially as a telecommunications company and later as a multimedia software development services company), Daphne Communications S.A. (publishing company), Heaven Music (recording label) and ANTEL (wireless transmission).

In March 2011, Dish Network renewed a multi-year contract with Antenna Group for Greek programming, includes future launch of Antenna Prime, featuring live soccer and classic Greek shows. The agreement ensures continued carriage of Greek language channels in US.

On October 1, 2021, ANT1 Group acquired Sony Pictures Television's Central and Eastern European portfolio (22 channels and two on-demand services).

In early 2022, MBC Group Middle East invested €225 million in Antenna Greece through capital increase.

== Operations ==
=== Broadcasting ===
==== Greece ====
- ANT1
- Makedonia TV

==== Cyprus ====
- ANT1 Cyprus

==== Romania ====
- AXN
- AXN Black
- AXN Spin
- AXN White
- Kiss TV
- Magic TV
- Rock TV

==== Hungary ====
- AXN
- Viasat 2
- Viasat 3
- Viasat 6
- AXN Crime

==== Poland ====
- AXN
- AXN Black
- AXN Spin
- AXN White

==== Czech Republic, Slovakia and Bulgaria ====
- AXN
- AXN Black
- AXN White

==== Balkans ====
- AXN
- AXN Spin

==== International ====
- ANT1 Europe
- ANT1 Pacific
- ANT1 Satellite

==== Defunct channels ====
- ANT1 Prime (classic ANT1 programming service in North America)
- B92 Info (24-hour news channel in Serbia and Montenegro)
- Blue (music channel in North America and Australia)
- One TV (regional channel in Romania)

==== Divested channels ====
- Nova (Sold to Modern Times Group and later to Advance Media. Currently owned by United Group)
- Planet TV Slovenia (First sold to Telekom Slovenije and later to TV2 Csoport. Formerly a joint venture with TS)
  - Planet 2
  - Planet Plus (renamed in 2021 to Planet Eva)
- Prva Srpska Televizija (Sold to Kopernikus Corporation)
  - B92
  - Prva Files
  - Prva Imagine
  - Prva Kick
  - Prva Life
  - Prva Max
  - Prva Plus
  - Prva World

=== Radio ===
==== Greece ====
- Easy 97.2 FM
- Rythmos 94.9 FM

==== Cyprus ====
- ANT1 FM 102.7 & 103.7

==== Romania ====
- Kiss FM
- Magic FM
- Rock FM

==== Divested stations ====
- Easy 97.5 Thessaloniki (Sold to Antonis Kanakis in 2023 and later renamed Radio Paidaki 97.5)
- Play Radio Serbia
- Prvi Srpski Radio
- Radio Express Bulgaria (Sold to SBS Broadcasting Group in 2007 and later renamed The Voice. Currently owned by United Group)
- Rythmos 104 Thessaloniki (Sold to Antonis Kanakis in 2016 and later renamed FLY 104)

=== Telecommunications ===
- ANTEL (wireless transmission)
- Audiotex (multimedia software development services)

=== Publishing ===
- Daphne Communications S.A.

=== Music ===
- 314 Records
- Heaven Music

=== Cinemas ===
- Village Cinemas Greece (under licence by Village Cinemas since 2022)

=== Education ===
- Antenna Media Lab
- Antenna Screenwriting Academy

=== Antenna Digital Ventures ===
Antenna Digital Ventures is the investing arm of Antenna Group focusing on setting up digital start ups in the regions the group operates. Antenna Digital Ventures has launched three start-up companies, Pricefox with Samlino Group, Stargram and Jukebooks.

== See also ==
- ANT1
- List of programs broadcast by ANT1
