= Takis Diamantopoulos =

Greek photographer (born 1949)

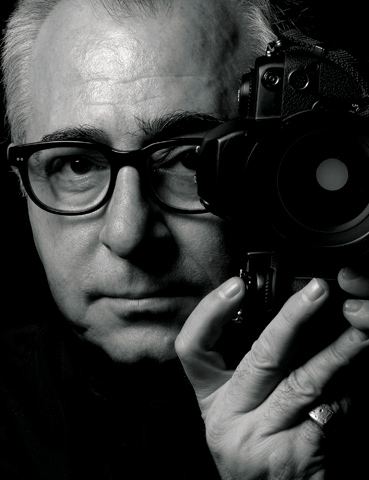
- Born: October 8, 1949 (age 77); Athens, Greece
- Occupation: Photographer
- Known for: Fashion photography, portrait photography

Takis Diamantopoulos (born 8 October 1949) has been involved professionally with photography since 1970. He was born and lives in Athens.

He comes from a family of photographers. Both his grandfather as well as his father were successful professional ones. It was at his father's side that Takis had his first photography lessons, assisting him for ten years up to 1975.

In 1968, he got involved with fashion photography. When he gets twenty years old he begins shooting the National Theater’s productions at the ancient Theater of Epidaurus. In 1972, he undertakes his first shooting for the French VOGUE. From 1975 until 1980 he sets up a studio with his brother Dinos, also a photographer, and for two years starting in 1979 they jointly published COVER magazine. From 1981 to 1983 Takis lived in Paris and Milan where he worked with the publishing house Condé Nast.

His photographs have prominently figured in most Greek (and 'foreign') magazines. They are mainly Fashion shoots and Portraits of notable Greeks, including intellectuals, artists and actors, who have positively impacted and brightened the cultural life of his country.

He has held numerous personal exhibitions, of which two in Thessaloniki and three in Athens.
