= Theodore Kyriakou =

Greek businessman (born 1974)

- Born: 10 February 1974 (age 52)
- Education: Georgetown University
- Title: CEO, ANT1 Group
- Father: Minos Kyriakou
- Relatives: Xenophon Kyriakou (brother)

Theodore M. Kyriakou (born 10 February 1974) is a Greek businessman, the CEO of ANT1 Group, the largest Greek media company, which was owned by his father Minos Kyriakou until his death in July 2017.

Theodore Kyriakou was born in 1974, a son of Minos Kyriakou.

He has degrees in International Business and Finance and in Physics, from Georgetown University in Washington, D.C.
