= ANT1 =

Television network in Greece and Cyprus

- Country: Greece
- Broadcast area: National
- Headquarters: Kifisias Avenue 10-12, Marousi, Athens, Greece

Programming
- Language: Greek
- Picture format: 1080i HDTV (downscaled to 16:9 aspect ratio 576i for the SDTV feed)

Ownership
- Owner: Antenna TV S.M.S.A. (Media Capital Partners Irish Collective Asset-Management Vehicle); 72,3% Antenna Group; 25,4% MBC Group; 2,3% Eurobank Ergasias
- Sister channels: ANT1 Cyprus; Makedonia TV

History
- Launched: 31 December 1989; 36 years ago

Links
- Website: ANT1 TV

Availability

Terrestrial
- Digea: All over Greece at local frequencies

Streaming media
- ANT1 Plus: watch.antennaplus.gr

Antenna, better known as ANT1, is a free-to-air television network airing in Greece. The alternate spelling is wordplay in Greek; ena (ένα) is the Greek number 1 (one), thus ANT1 is pronounced the same as Antenna (Αντέννα). It launched on 31 December 1989, and is owned by Antenna Group. ANT1 had been a popular network in Greece for years with its line up of soap series including dramas Lampsi and Kalimera Zoi. ANT1's TV studios are located in the Athens suburb of Marousi, from which the nickname "Marousi Channel" comes.

== History ==
The first broadcast of the channel was on 31 December 1989. Programs that were once shown on ANT1 include CBS Evening News from the U.S. ANT1 Satellite News was also shown until the late 1990s.

Antenna was founded by Minos Kyriakou and today is led by Theodore Kyriakou. He served as Executive Vice President of the ANT1 Group S.A. (from 1995) and as Chief Operating Officer (from September 1998) until his appointment in March 1999 as Chief Executive Officer, a position which he held until his appointment in January 2002 as Group Vice Chairman. Mr. Kyriakou has been a Director since September 1998.

== ANT1 International channels ==
Since 1993, Antenna has broadcast its programming internationally for Greek-speaking audiences abroad. Initially, the broadcast was for a few hours each day but since 2000 has evolved into a full channel that operates twenty-four hours a day. ANT1 currently operates three television channels, via satellite, which vary according to the different geographical targets:

- Antenna Europe for audiences in Europe (outside Greece and Cyprus) which has been operating since 2006.
- Antenna Pacific for audiences in Australia which has been operating since 1996.
- Antenna Satellite for audiences in America which has been operating since 1993.

== ANT1 HD ==
ANT1 began broadcasting in high definition (HD) by the evening of March 1, 2016. The program is transmitted as the normal broadcast and at the frequency of simple definition, but the parent (native HD) broadcast only emits what has been shot with this resolution.

== Netwix ==
In 2010, Antenna Group had launched on-demand Internet media service Netwix, available to viewers in Greece. It mainly included short YouTube-style comedy videos created by famous Greek comedians. Netwix closed in 2023 due to the high costs of production and the low audience appeal.

== ANT1+ ==
Since April 2022, Antenna Group has launched its own subscription-based streaming media, which includes some original shows such as "Serres" and "I Gefyra (The Bridge)", along with many movies and foreign television series.

=== Sports broadcasting rights ===
- Formula One (Formula 1 / Formula 2 / Formula 3 / F1 Academy / Porsche Supercup)
- NASCAR Cup Series
- UEFA Europa League
- UEFA Conference League

== Controversy ==
In July 2022, following the assassination of Shinzo Abe, a news segment on ANT1 TV Greece shared the same images of Hideo Kojima, identifying him as the alleged killer. ANT1 TV Greece took down the video on July 8 (when Abe was killed), but the story caused major controversy as it became viral globally. The mistake first started going viral after French far-right politician Damien Rieu tweeted pictures of Kojima in response to another politician's tweet about the assassination. The 4chan post used a photo of Kojima and falsely labelled him as a "left-wing extremist" with a criminal record. In response, Hideo Kojima threatened to sue over false posts, stating that he "strongly condemns the spread of fake news and rumours that convey false information".

== Slogans ==
ANT1 has had various slogans over the years including:

- from 1989 until 1998: "ΑΝΤ1-Νούμερο Ένα" ("ANT1-The Number One")
- from 1998 until 2000: "Όλα για σένα" ("All for you")
- 2000 – 2001 season: "Βλέπεις με την καρδιά σου" ("You're watching with your heart")
- 2001 – 2002 season: "Καλύτερα μαζί" ("Better together")
- 2002 – 2003 season: "Ένας κόσμος για σένα" ("A world for you")
- 2003 – 2004 season: "Βλέπω ANT1" ("I'm watching ANT1")
- 2004 – 2005 season: "Η ζωή θέλει ANT1" ("Life wants ANT1")
- 2005 – 2006 season: "Όλα παίζουν" ("Everything's possible")
- 2005 – 2006 season: "Δυνατά" ("Loud")
- 2006 – 2007 season: "Μη χάνεις στιγμή" ("Don't miss a moment")
- 2007 – 2008 season: "Βλέπεις καλά. είναι ΑΝΤ1." ("You see it right. It's ANT1.")
- from 2008 until 2012: "Fresh"
- from 2012 until 2014: "Τα ωραιότερα πράγματα στη ζωή, δεν είναι πράγματα." ("The most beautiful things in life, are not things.")
- 2014 – Summer 2015: "Όλοι εδώ" ("Everybody here")
- Summer – Autumn 2015: "Καλοκαίρι εδώ" ("Summer here")
- Autumn 2015 – Autumn 2017: ANT1
- Autumn 2017 – Summer 2018: That's ANT1 ("Απίστευτο! Unbelievable!")
- Summer – Autumn 2018: Ώρα για ANT1 ("Time for ANT1")
- Autumn 2018 – September 2023: Είμαστε Ένα ("We are one")
- 31 December 2019 – 31 December 2020: 30 Χρόνια Είμαστε Ένα ("30 years we are one")
- September 2023 – September 2024: Άλλη Εμπειρία! ("Another Experience!")
- September 2024 – September 2025: Αυθεντικός ΑΝΤ1 ("Authentic ANT1")

== Logos ==
31 December 1989 – 16 September 2007

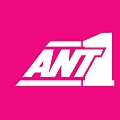
17 September 2007 – 14 September 2008

15 September 2008 – present
