= Sofia Vogiatzaki =

Greek actress (born 1971)

- Born: June 21, 1971 (age 55); Athens, Greece
- Education: Veaki Drama School
- Occupation: Actress
- Years active: 1998–present

Sofia Vogiatzaki (born June 21, 1971) is a Greek actress.

== Biography ==
She was born and raised in Athens. From a young age she began to dance, specifically ballet, for 11 years. After an accident, she decided to study acting and work as an actress.

== Television ==
She made her television debut as an actress in the 2001–2002 season in Lefteris Papapetrou's comedy series Eisai to Tairi mou on MEGA. This was followed by her participation in the game show Ta tetragona ton Asteron, while in the 2003–2005 seasons she was a co-host with Grigoris Arnaoutoglou on MEGA's morning show Omorfos kosmos to proi. In 2004, she participated as a guest in the series I Ntanta and Epta thanasimes petheres. In the 2005–2006 season, she had one of the leading roles in the eighth season of the daily series Apagorevmeni Agapi, while she participated in the series Sto Para Pente and To Kokkino Domatio. and Big Bang.

Her participation in the Epta thanasimes petheres followed, while in the 2007–2009 season, she played in the series Latremenoi mou geitones, 7 Zoes and To Soi mou mesa. and To amartama tis mitros mou. In 2014, she made an appearance in the series Kato Partali, while in 2015, she presented, together with Noni Dounia, Despina Kampouri and Elena Papavasiliou, the daily afternoon show Gynaikes. In 2018, he participated in an episode of the series Deka Mikroi Mitsoi, while in the 2018-2019 season he participates in the comedy series Eleftheri Schesi.

In the 2019 season, the series Mamades sto punkaki of Novalife. She played in the main cast of the daily drama series of Alpha and Alpha Cyprus Asteria stin Ammo. In the 2021 season, she made a special appearance in the comedy of Alpha Cyprus Camping. In the 2021–2022 season, she participated in the series Sympetheroi apo ta Tirana. In the 2023 season, the series Mairi Mairi Mairi on MEGA and Just the 2 Of Us and in the series Karma on Alpha Cyprus and in the series I Katara tis Tzelas Delafragka on Alpha TV.

== Cinema ==
She made her film debut in 1998 in the film o Adelfos mou kai Ego. In 2000 she participated in the film Risotto. In 2002 she took part in the films O Vasilias and kourastika na skotono tous agapitikous sou. This was followed by the films Loukoumades me meli (2005) and I Love Karditsa (2010).
