= Down Town (magazine) =

Greek magazine

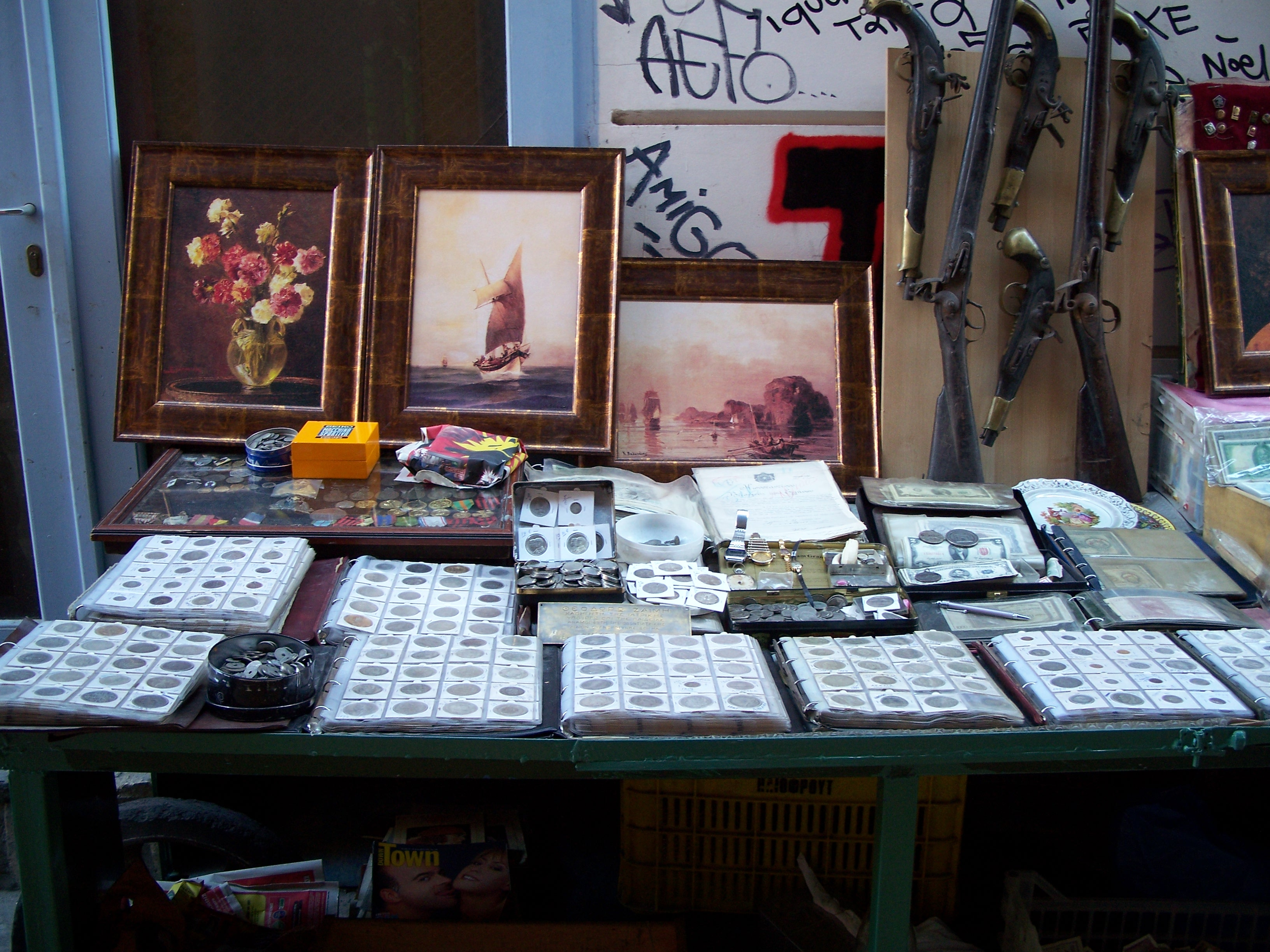
A copy of the magazine can be viewed under the table here in a flea market in Monastiraki, Athens

Down Town is a magazine published in Greece by the Imako Media Group. Aimed at fashionable Greek adults, it is one of the best-selling weekly magazines in Greece with a circulation of 27,000. It was established in December 1995. The magazine often features sexually provocative content and always features an attractive female or male Greek celebrity on the cover.

2011 cover features included Sissi Christidou, Erika Prezerakou, Maria Solomou, Kalomoira Sarantis, Zeta Makrypoulia, Alexis Georgoulis, Katerina Papoutsaki, Michalis Hatzigiannis, Eleonora Meleti, Elli Kokkinou, Sakis Rouvas and Dimitra Matsouka.

== Issue ==
Number	Day	Cover Personality(ies)	Title	Notes
1	November 26, 2015	None	We	
2	December 3, 2015	Despina Vandi		
3	December 10, 2015	Smaragda Karydi		
4	December 17, 2015	Penelope Anastasopoulou	Penelope's Child	
5	December 24, 2015	Elli Stai	The Naked Issue	
6	December 31, 2015	Katerina Papoutsaki	Sexy New Year	
7	January 7, 2016	Vicky Hadjivassiliou	Vicky the Body	
8	January 14, 2016	Giorgos Liagkas	Liagkas was right	
9	January 21, 2016	Peristera Baziana Tsipra & Mareva Gragofsky Mitsotaki	Alexis' Peristera VS Kyriakos' Mareva	
11	February 4, 2016	Lakis Lazopoulos	Lakis took his broom	
12	February 11, 2016	Katerina Kainourgiou		
15	March 3, 2016	Apostolos Gkletsos	I don't care if they will call me gay!	
20	April 7, 2016	George Mavridis	I haven't finished school	
28	June 2, 2016	Athina Oikonomakou	The new national body poses in a swimsuit and breaks Instagram	
112	January 11, 2018	Dimitris Vlachos, Eleni Hatzidou, Lampros Choutos, Michalis Mouroutsos, Olga Farmaki, Thodoris Thodoropoulos & Nasos Papargyropoulos	Survivor is back	
113	January 18, 2018	Tzimis Panousis	Tzimis doesn't live here anymore	
114	January 25, 2018	Zeta Makripoulia & Nikos Moutsinas	Humour and High Heels	
115	February 1, 2018	Penelope Anastasopoulou, Maria Korinthiou & Evridiki Valavani	We love our body how it is	
116	February 8, 2018	Doretta Papadimitriou	One Survivor of love	
117	February 15, 2018	George Lianos	Yes, I will be the co-host of Survivor	
118	February 22, 2018	Dimitra Matsouka	The sexy girl is back	
119	March 1, 2018	Jenny Balatsinou	I'm not pregnant!	
120	March 8, 2018	Eleni Hatzidou	I will not be friend with Spyropoulou	
121	March 15, 2018	Christos Simardanis	Christos Simardanis (1956-2018) A beautiful soul	
122	March 22, 2018	Ioannis Drymonakos	They don't look for the new Danos on Survivor	
123	March 29, 2018	Panos Ioannidis, Sotiris Kondizas & Leonidas Koutsopoulos	Everybody loves Master Chef	
124	April 5, 2018	Eleni Foureira	33 days before Fuego in Eurovision	
125	April 12, 2018	Jenny Balatsinou & Vasilis Kikilias	Sudden divorce	
126	April 19, 2018	Gina Alimonou & Pavlos Vardinogiannis	The hard divorce	
127	April 26, 2018	Natasa Kalogridi & Lykourezos	Cover Love	
128	May 3, 2018	Lakis Lazopoulos	TV King	
129	May 10, 2018	Gogo Mastrokosta	Gogo is back again!	
130	May 17, 2018	Jane Fonda & Eleni Menegaki	Eleni in Canes Festival	
131	May 24, 2018	Prince Harry, Duke of Sussex & Meghan, Duchess of Sussex	Love and the crown	
132	May 31, 2018	Antonis Remos & Yvonne Bosnjak	Sudden Weeding	
133	June 7, 2018	Nasos Papargyropoulos	The most wanted bachelor	
134	June 14, 2018	Sakis Rouvas, Konstantinos Kafiris	Ιn the courts	
135	June 20, 2018	Despina Vandi	Diva on board	
136	June 27, 2018	Maria Bakodimou	Dr. Love	
137	July 4, 2018	Maria Korinthiou	The siren	
138	July 11, 2018	Antonis Sroiter & Ioanna Bouki	Summer weeding	
139	July 18, 2018	Ilias Gkotsis	The winner of Survivor	
140	July 25, 2018	Elli Kokkinou	Happy Birthday Elli	
141	August 1, 2018	None	We will never forget 23/7/18 Mati	
142	August 8, 2018	Zoe Laskari	One year without Zoe	
143	August 15, 2018	Giorgos Danos Angelopoulos	Danos one year later	
144	August 22, 2018	Natasa Kalogridi	Fragile	
145	August 29, 2018	Katerina Stikoudi & Vangelis Serifis	Wedding in the village	
146	September 5, 2018	Sakis Tanimanidis & Christina Bomba	#SAKISCHRISTINA	
147	September 12, 2018	Konstantina Spyropoulou	I sleep peacefully at night	
148	September 19, 2018	Antonis Remos & Yvonne Bosnjak	The big party	
149	September 26, 2018	Maria Bekatorou	How sexy are you Maria Bekatorou?	
150	October 3, 2018	Penelope Anastasopoulou	Mamma is a rolling stone!	
151	October 10, 2018	Maria Menounos & Athina Oikonomakou	The glam brides of autumn	
152	October 17, 2018	Ioannis Drymonakos, Yannis Apostolakis & Kallia Eleftheriou	We are the seawolves	
153	October 24, 2018	Vicky Kaya, Dimitris Skoulos, Angelos Bratis & Iliana Papageorgiou	The tough of Greek TV	
154	October 31, 2018	Grigoris Arnaoutoglou, Antonis Kanakis & Giorgos Liagkas	Whose is bigger?	
155	November 7, 2018	Maria Korinthiou	Finally Blonde	
156	November 14, 2018	Natalia Germanou	28 Years in our lives	
157	November 21, 2018	Doretta Papadimitriou	I'm single and I'm OK	
158	November 28, 2018	Eleni Menegaki	All what we never said!	
159	December 5, 2018	Megki Ndrio	The answer of Megki Ndrio	
160	December 12, 2018	Katerina Geronikolou	The girl of the year	
