= Renos Haralambidis =

Greek actor, screenwriter and film director

- Ρένος Χαραλαμπίδης
- Born: Athens, Greece
- Occupations: Filmmaker, Actor, Radio Producer
- Years active: 1994–present

Renos Haralambidis (Greek: Ρένος Χαραλαμπίδης) is a Greek film director, screenwriter, actor, and radio personality. Known for his work in independent cinema, he gained recognition as an auteur filmmaker by writing, directing, and starring in feature films such as No Budget Story (1997) and Cheap Smokes (Ftina Tsigara, 2000), the latter of which developed a strong cult status and was later adapted into a musical at the Alternative Stage of the Greek National Opera.

Parallel to his filmmaking, Haralambidis has maintained an extensive acting career across Greek cinema, television, and theatre, as well as television appearances including serving as a judge on Your Face Sounds Familiar. He is also active as a radio presenter and voiceover artist.

== Director & Writer ==
Year	Title	REf.
1995	First of all, don't call me Doofy!	
1997	No Budget Story	
2000	Cheap Cigarettes	
2005	The heart of the beast	
2010	Four Black Suites	
2024	Night announcer	

== Film Actor ==
Year	Title	Role
1994	Birds with the color of the moon	Alexis
1995	Recitativo	
1995	What about a date?	
1995	The unknown	
1995	Between cities	
1995	First of all, don't call me Doofy!	
1996	The trip	
1996	Blindfolded	
1997	No Budget Story	Eirineos
1997	Family protector	Alexandros Kondos
1998	Black Out	
1998	Coffee	
1998	From home to the corner	
1999	Black Milk	
2000	Cheap Cigarettes	Nikos
2002	The Bubble	Taxi Driver
2002	The secret of November	
2003	Liza and all the others	Petros
2003	The brave men of Samothrace	Pvt. Angelonias
2003	Love me	Cameraman
2004	No matter where	Alexis
2004	He who dies last dies best	
2005	Csudafilm	
2005	The dream of Icarus	Kostas
2005	The heart of the beast	Stefanos Tzoutzes
2005	Loafing and Camouflage: Sirens in the Aegean	Xenofon Makris
2006	Morally Excellent	Beethoven
2006	Illustration	Patient
2006	Dreams of a summer countryside	Renos
2007	El Greco	Auctioneer
2007	Sucker in class	Director
2009	If it's not for you	Takis
2009	The canteen	Gambler
2010	Four Black Suites	Makis
2010	Arcadia Lost	Manager
2010	Show Bitch	Protonotarios
2010	The flight of the swan	Dara's man
2011	Magic Hour	Diomidis
2011	Loafing and Camouflage: Sirens at Land	Xenofon Makris
2012	Poker Face	Adiavrohos' father
2012	Lubire Elenã	
2014	The sensitives	Dance Studio Owner
2014	Common denominator	Dimitris
2015	Edith	Sanford
2016	Swing Away	Panayiotis
2021	Jackpot	Makis Messias
2024	Night announcer	
2025	A Spartan Dream	Mayor Katsika

== Television ==
Year	Title	Role(s)	Notes
1992	Anatomy of a crime	Mirka's Fiend	Episode: "Fatal relationship"
1992	Anatomy of a crime	Student	Episode: "Blind revenge"
1992	Anatomy of a crime	Lakis	Episode: "No mercy"
1992	Anatomy of a crime	Tasos	Episode: "Short circuit"
1993	Anatomy of a crime	Gas Station Employee	Episode: "In cold blood"
1993	Anatomy of a crime	Man In Park	Episode: "Punishment"
1993	Anatomy of a crime	Kostas	Episode: "Jealousy"
1993	Anatomy of a crime	Myrto's friend	Episode: "The price"
1994	Anatomy of a crime	Paul's friend	Episode: "Last show"
1994	Anatomy of a crime	Dimo's coworker	Episode: "Affectionate relationship"
1994	Anatomy of a crime	Protector	Episode: "The professional"
1994	Love Dare Stories	Nikos	Episode: "All about Vicky"
1994	Anatomy of a crime	Soldier	Episode: "Sorry Jimmy"
1994	Anatomy of a crime	Jimmy	Episode: "Poveri fiori"
1995	Anatomy of a crime	Efthimios	Episode: "Fallen angel"
1995	Magic Night	Alkis Panagiotou	Episode: "Death mat"
1995	Moral Department	Robber	Episode: "The desire is a trap"
1995	Love Dare Stories	Spyros	Episode: "Party night"
1995	One life for Elsa	Man At The Bar	1 episode
1995-1996	The absent		Main role, 20 episodes
1996	Scorpio	Stavros Efthimiou	3 episodes
1996	The professionals	Dimos Ambatzis	Episode: "The eyes of the soul"
1996	Life Roller Coaster	Zisis	1 episode
1996-1997	Stand Up Sophia	Antonis	Main role, 51 episodes
1996-1997	Coloured Sun		Series regular, 18 episodes
1997	A Night Like That	Vasilis Argyriou	Main role, 12 episodes
1997-1998	Lost Letters	Michalis	Lead role, 13 episodes
1999-2000	Something's Going On With The Neighbors!	Thanasis Kalimeris	Lead role, 27 episodes
2000-2001	Cover Trouble	Christos	Lead role, 18 episodes
2000-2001	ID	Himself (host)	Weekend game show on ALPHA
2001	See You On Board	Konstantinos Ioustinos	1 episode
2001-2002	Orange Vodka	Vangelis Maniateas	Lead role, 33 episodes
2002	I think I know you	Man Talking On Camera	2 episodes
2003-2004	Parents' Sins	Phoebus	Lead role, 29 episodes
2004	The Nanny	Babis Tsopelas	1 episode
2004	Dancing with Zaralykos	Konstantinos Kalpis	Episode: "How to be a minister"
2004	Everything on the rooftop	Ares	3 episodes
2004	Seven Deadly Mothers-In-Law	Kostas Fanariotis	Episode: "The Modern Mother-In-Law"
2005	Alone through negligence	Sotiriadis	1 episode
2006	A marriage with everything	Elias	Episode: "Umbilical cord"
2006	Unknown Home	Thanasis	1 episode
2006	The Red Suite	Petros	Episode: "The Golden Buddha"
2006	Seven Deadly Mothers-In-Law	Alexis Gkantzos	Episode: "The Male Mother-In-Law"
2006	Honorable Cuckolds	Hercules Batarias	Episode: "The Loner Cuckold"
2008	Amore Mio	Panos	1 episode
2008	Safe Sex TV Stories	Stathis	Episode: "Photography Classes"
2008	Bad boys	Giorgos	Episode: "Ju-do"
2010	You cannot take from someone who doesn't have it	Dias (voice role)	1 episode
2010-2011	You think you have it	Himself (host)	Daytime game show on ALPHA
2011-2012	Play and win	Himself (host)	Daytime game show on ANT1
2012	My Mother's Sin	Michalis Katsigiannis	1 episode
2012-2014	Pants Down	Chrysanthos Papadogiannotheocharopoulos	Lead role, 34 episodes
2014-2015	Every place and a story	Himself (host)	Daytime game show on NERIT
2015	Your Family	Andreas Petropavlopoulos	Episode: "Mavrogyalouros"
2017-2018	Dream Man	Dinos Karasavvidis	Main role, 76 episodes
2019	Boys for life	Nutriotionist	Episode: "I need a heroe"
2020-2023	Our Best Years	Vangelis Papadopoulos	Main role, 62 Episodes
2022	The Masked Singer Greece	Minotaur	Season 1; Winner
2024	Your Face Sounds Familiar	Judge	Main Role, 12 Episodes

== Music videos ==
Year	Title	Artist(s)	Ref.
2001	Don't talk about her	Pyx Lax & Theodosia Tsatsou	
2001	Pacemaker	Etsi De	
2002	Thelo na ginei to diko mou	Rakel	
2004	Your love is innocent	Nikos Makropoulos	
2016	My heart is moving	Giorgos Doukas	
