= Memos Mpegnis =

Greek actor

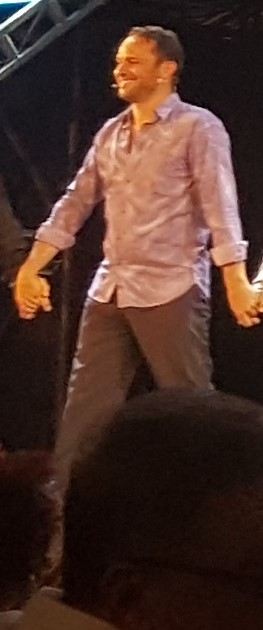
- Memos Mpegnis, at the musical "To diko mas cinema" - "Our own cinema" - at Alsos theatre, Athens, June 2019
- Born: Agamemnonas Mpegnis; November 20, 1974 (age 51); Salamis Island, Greece

Memos Mpegnis (Greek: Μέμος Μπεγνής; born 20 November 1974 on Salamis Island) is a Greek actor. He plays in Hellenic television series and theatre. He also plays the piano relatively fluently and sings. He has had leading roles in many television series such as Akros Oikogeniakon (2001–2003), Mi mou les antio (2004–2005), Ston Ilio tou Aigaiou (2005–2006) on the ANT1 channel. He currently stars in the MEGA TV Cyprus' show ΤΟ ΔΑΧΤΥΛΙΔΙ ΤΗΣ ΦΩΤΙΑΣ (The Ring of Fire 2014–2015).

His career as an actor began quite by accident when he played piano in a performance of Katia Dandoulaki, which prompted him to enter into acting. He has studied the piano since he was 5 years old and has graduated as a soloist. He was going to be a pianist until Katia Dandoulaki met him and asked him to portray a soldier alongside fellow actors Giorgos Karamihos and Panagiotis Petrakis in a play called "The Trojan Women" written by Euripides.

== Filmography ==
=== Television ===
Year	Title	Role(s)	Notes
2000	The Auntrespected	Dimitris	Main role, 20 episodes
2001	Scent of Woman	Paris	6 episodes
2001-2003	Extremely Family	Aris Theotokatos	Lead role, 48 episodes
2002-2005	Ambitions	Angelos Prekas	Main role, 450 episodes
2004	Seven Deadly Mothers-In-Law	Takis	Episodes: "The Punisher Mother-In-Law"
2004-2005	Don't say goodbuy	Murat	Lead role, 32 episodes
2005	2005 Madame Figaro Awards - Women of the Year	Herself (host)	TV special
2005-2006	Under the Aegean Sun	Alkis Anagnostou	Lead role, 30 episodes
2006-2007	Let's start again	Markos Papadakis	Lead role, 18 episodes
2006-2007	Elli Lambeti: The Last Show	Alekos Alexandrakis	6 episodes
2007	Honorable Cuckolds	Nikos	Episode: "The mama's boy cuckold"
2007	The stories of detective Bekas	Stefanos Mavridis	Episodes: "Night call"
2007-2008	Lighthouse	Stefanos	Lead role, 17 episodes (13 unaired)
2008	My Beloved Neighbors	Achileas Papapavlou	3 episodes
2009	Lakis the sweetie	Yannis	8 episodes
2009-2011	Fullmoon	Achileas Apostolou	Lead role, 583 episodes
2011-2012	Singles & Handsome	Alexandros	Lead role, 14 episodes
2014-2015	The Ring of Fire	Christos Orfeas	Lead role, 122 episodes
2015	National Team	Manos Kapsalis	6 episodes
2015-2016	Wonders and Portents	Yorgos	Lead role, 14 episodes
2016	Don't start grumbling	Engelbrecht	1 episode
2016-2017	9 Months	Dimitris	Lead role, 148 episodes
2019	Unknown Woman	Stefanos Kosmidis	100 episodes
2020-2022	The Butterfly's Secret	Nikolas Papadakis	Lead role, 214 episodes
2022	Just Yesterday	Stefanos Pappas	40 episodes
2022	The Masked Singer	Cyclops (contestant)	3 episodes
2023	The Doctor	Antonis	Episode: "Till death"
2024-2025	Taboo	Loukianos Kartalis	Lead role, 48 episodes
2025	Undercover Mum	Dimitris Prokomenos	14 episodes
2026	Your Face Sounds Familiar	Himself (contestant)	12 episodes; season 8

=== Film ===
Year	Title	Role	Notes
2007	Fugitive Pieces	Alkis	Film debut
2009	Soula Ela Xana	Manolis Skandamis	
2010	O thanatos pou oneireftika	madman	
