= Athina Oikonomakou =

Greek actress, businesswoman and media personality (born 1986)

- Αθηνά Οικονομάκου
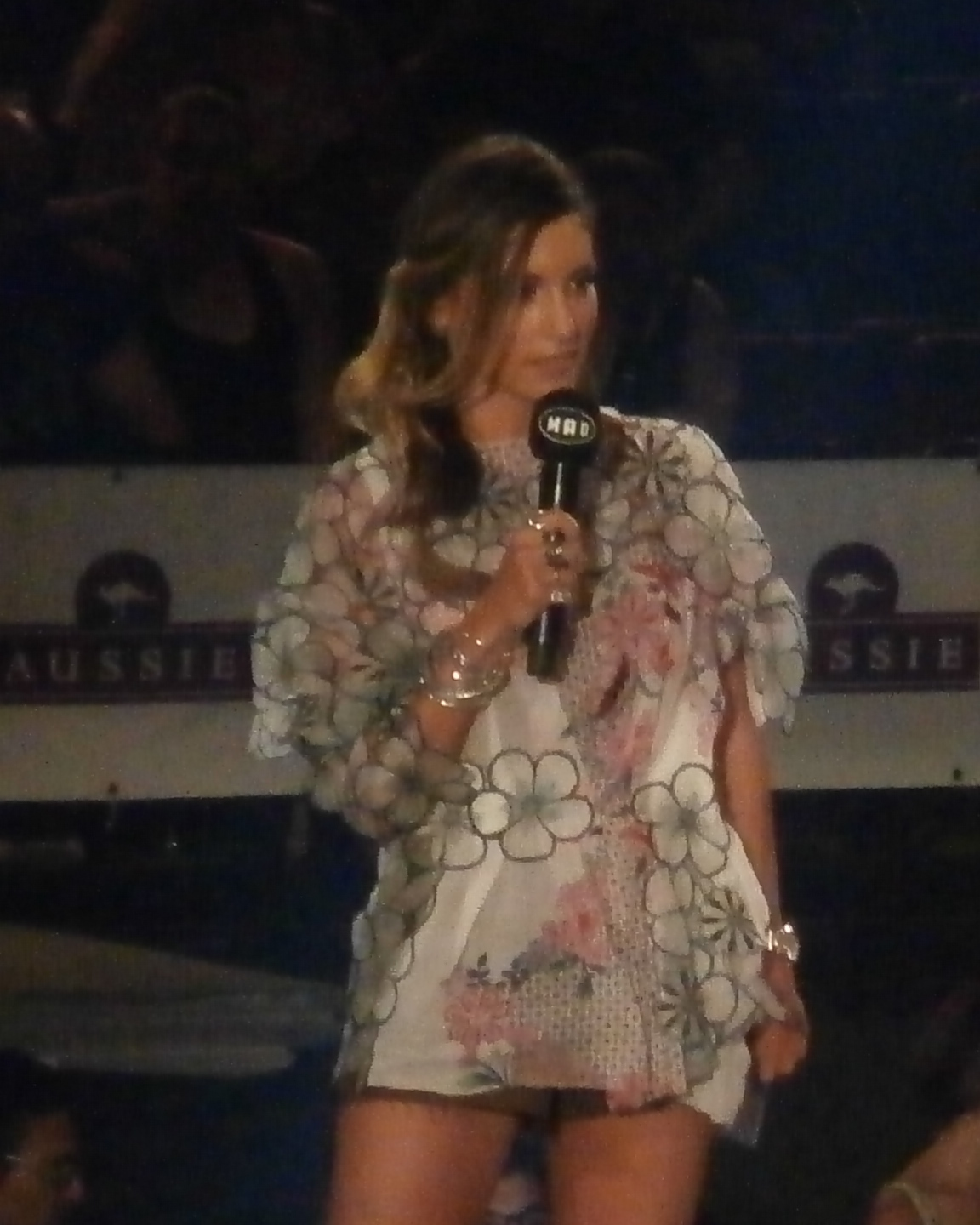
- Born: 6 March 1986 (age 40); Skala, Laconia, Greece
- Children: 2

Athina Oikonomakou (Greek: Αθηνά Οικονομάκου, IPA: [aθiˈna i.ko.noˈma.ku]; born 6 March 1986) is a Greek actress, businesswoman and media personality. After she finished her acting studies, she made her first acting appearances in television, theatre and cinema. She gained huge fame in 2009 when she started leading in the daytime soap opera of MEGA, The life of the other woman as Xenia Pappa, from 2009 to 2012. Followed by the other daytime successful lead roles in, Stolen Dreams (2011), The ring of fire (2014) and On my shoes (2016).

In 2016, Oikonomakou launched her own jewelry brand, Allover by Athina Oikonomakou followed by her second company in the fashion industry, Project Soma in 2019.

== Early life ==
Athina Oikonomakou was born on March 6 1986, in Skala, Laconia, to Dionysis Oikonomakos, a naval officer and Georgia Oikonomakou, a housewife. She has an older brother, Nikitas (b. 1979).

At the age of 18, after graduating from school, she entered university. For this reason, she moved to Athens to study at the Agricultural University of Athens.

== Career ==
=== University, acting studies and acting debut (2005-2008) ===
During the second year of her studies in 2005, she decided to quit university in order to change her career route. For this reason, she gave her exams for the acting school of Mimí Deníssi, "Centre Stage by Mimí Deníssi", where she was accepted. After 4 semesters of studying acting, she graduated in 2007.

In the summer of 2007, she took part in an audition of ANT1 for new actors for the upcoming TV series of the season. There she gained her first television role in the comedy- drama, Deligiannis Girls' School, where she portrayed Domna Nika, one of the students at the Greek girls' school back in the late '30s. In 2008, she made her debut in cinema in a short film drama, An Angel's Bet. She also appeared in an episode of the romantic drama, True Loves, while she also starred in the commercial for, Wash & Go. In September of the same year, she took on her first leading role on television in the comedy series, The Fearless, where she played next to Giannis Vouros. The series was not a great success and was discontinued after just three months of airing. Furthermore, she made her theatre debut next to Spyros Papadopoulos in the play, The flower of Levande, for a season.

=== Television success and next acting hits (2009-2016) ===
In 2009, Oikonomakou starred in a commercial for the mobile phone company, "Germanos", and made a brief appearance on the MEGA successful family comedy series, My Beloved Neighbors , as Danae. In the same year, she took the lead role of Xenia Pappa in the brand new MEGA daytime soap opera, "The Life of the Other Woman" (directed by Dimitris Arvanitis), a role that made her famous to the general public but also made it quite difficult for her to join the leading cast of the series. Oikonomakou had stated in an interview: "For the Life of the Other Woman I did 30 castings with the director. I think he called me for two months every day and every day he gave me another text. I did not expect to take the role. I had suffered so much. I did so many castings because they did not want me from the channel. I was an inexperienced girl, very young, not at all known, it was a leading role, very difficult and strong”. So, she had to convince them (the director) in many ways that she can do it." Finally, the show premiered on 27 September 2009 and due to its great success, it ended after three TV seasons, on 6 January 2012. At the same time, in December 2011, she starred as Chryssa Maltezou in the new MEGA daytime soap opera, "Stolen Dreams", continuing her collaboration with the director Dimitris Arvanitis for a few more years. The huge success of the show caused MEGA to renew it for a few extra seasons. In 2014, after the end of the third season, she announced that she would not continue having the lead role of the show for the fourth season, but she would make short guest appearances for the season 2014/15. In 2014, she took part in an episode of the successful ALPHA comedy, "Do not start the moaning", next to Panos Vlachos and Joanna Fyllidis.

On September 22 2014, she also starred in the daytime drama of MEGA Cyprus, "The Ring of Fire", until May 6 2015, when the show concluded. After six whole years on daytime television with a successful appearance, in the 2015/2016 season, she starred in the MEGA prime-time comedy, "The Worst Week of My Life" (directed by Stefanos Blatsou), which is the Greek adaptation of the same- titled BBC One sitcom, along with Makis Papadimitriou, Arietta Moutousi and Gerasimos Skiadaresis. On April 18 2016, she made an appearance singing on the stage of the annual fashion and music TV show, 2016 MadWalk - The Fashion Music Project and sang, Whole Lotta Love, as a duet with Steven and the rock band My Excuse.

=== On my shoes, television appearances as herself and next acting steps (2016-today) ===
On October 3 2016, Oikonomakou began starring in the Alpha TV Daytime series, "On my shoes", portraying the character of the ruthless socialite, Fay Stathatou. Her presence on the show continued until the middle of the second season, in 2018, when she temporarily left the show to give birth to her first child. She returned on October 2018 at the beginning of the third season continuing the successful storyline. In 2021, she announced that she would leave the show forever this time, so she did, in April to give birth to her second child. The character of Fay Stathatou appeared for the last time on April 21 and she never made an appearance again, not even at the end of the show. On May 10 2019, she co-hosted with Nikos Moutsinas on his daytime comedy talk show, For the Company, on Open TV. In November 2020, she appeared as a guest art director on,Greece's Next Top Model, with Mary Synatsaki for the advertising of their company, Project S.O.M.A. by helping the contestants. After a short television absence, she came back in March 2022, as part of the panel on the first season of the Greek reality singing competition, The Masked Singer, for one season. In 2023, she came back on TV as an actress portraying Katia Lymberi on ANT1's dramedy, The First of Us, for one season. From October 2024, she had one of the main roles on MEGA family sitcom, I Have Children, playing the role of Ioanna Talage, a very rich and unrealistic mother.

=== Stage and film ===
Theatrically, Oikonomakou made her debut in 2008, with the play, "The Flower of Levante", at the Anesis Theater, while in 2010 she participated in the play, "The Cactus Flower", which was played in Thessaloniki. In the summer of 2011, she starred in the play, "The Desperate" (directed by George Valaris) at the Athena Theater. In the 2011–2012 season she played in the, "Method of Infidelity" (directed by Ch. Karchadaki), at the Veaki Theater and in the summer of 2012, she toured throughout Greece, with the play, "The Baptisms" (directed by Nikos Moutsinas), which was also played at the Ark Theater in the winter season 2012–2013. In the summer of 2013, they toured again. In the 2013–2014 season, she played in the play, "The KTEL" (directed by Nikos Moutsina), with which they performed in Thessaloniki in the summer of 2014. She has stated that she wants to dedicate herself to her family and that is why it will take some time to do theater again.

In the cinema, she has starred in four films. The first was, "Bet of Angels" (2008), followed by, "A Night in Athens" (2013),by Dimitris Arvanitis, "Amore mio" (2015) and "Magic Mirror" (2016) by Christos Dimas.

== Entrepreneurship ==
=== Allover by Athina Oikonomakou ===
In March 2016, Oikonomakou launched her first collection of handmade jewelry, under the name, Allover by Athina Oikonomakou. In February 2019, the first Allover store opened in Athens.

=== Project S.O.M.A. ===
In June 2019, she jointly launched with Maria Synatsaki, their first line of clothing, under the name Project S.O.M.A., which is available online.

== Filmography ==
=== Television ===
Year	Title	Role(s)	Notes
2007–2008	Deligiannis' Girls School	Domna Nika	Main role, 28 episodes
2008	True Loves	Eleni	Episode: "The beast in the cage"
2008–2009	The Fearless	Melina Valaskou	Main role, 14 episodes
2009	My Beloved Neighbors	Danai	1 episode
2009–2012	The Life of the Other Woman	Xenia Pappa	Lead role, 401 episodes
2011–2015	Stolen Dreams	Chrysa Maltezou	Lead role, 418 episodes (seasons 1–3); Recurring role, 30 episodes (season 4)
2014	Don't start grumbling	Katrina	1 episode
2014–2015	The Ring of Fire	Marina Stratigou	Lead role, 122 episodes
2015–2016	The Worst Week of my Life	Melina Korniliadi	Lead role, 7 episodes
2016	MadWalk - The Fashion Music Project	Herself (performance)	TV special
2016–2021	Come to my place	Fay Stathatou	Lead role, 800 episodes
2019	For Friends with Nikos Moutsinas	Herself (co-host)	Episode: "May 10 / Athina Oikonomakou"
2020	Greece's Next Top Model	Herself (guest)	Episode: "Art Director's Show"
2022	The Masked Singer Greece	Herself (judge)	Season 1
2023–2024	The First of Us	Katia Lymperi	Lead role, 60 episodes
2024–2026	I Have Children	Ioanna Talaz	Main role, 85 episodes

=== Film ===
Year	Title	Role	Notes	Ref.
2008	An Angel's Bet	Eva	Film debut	
2013	A Night in Athens	Myrto		
2015	Amore Mio	Nefeli		
2016	Magic Mirror	Natasa		

== Stage ==
Production	Year	Theater	Role
To Fioro tou Levade	2008-2009	Theater Aneses	
Cactus Flower	2010-2011	Theater Elesia	Tonia
Oi Apelpismenoi	2011	Theater Athena	
Le Système Ribadier	2011-2012	Theater Veaki	Aggeliki
Ta Vaftisia	2012	Tour	Borta Pomolova
Ta Vaftisia	2012-2013	Theater Kivotos	Borta Pomolova
Ta Vaftisia	2013	Tour	Borta Pomolova
To Ktel	2013-2014	Theater Kivotos	
To Ktel	2014	Theater Radio City	

== Personal life ==
In 2013, Oikonomakou began dating Greek entrepreneur, Philipos Michopoulos and in November 18 2017, they got married in a civil ceremony in her place of origin, Gytheio. On March 14 2018, Oikonomakou gave birth to their first child, a son, Maximos-Spyridon and a few months later on October 6, the couple got married in a religious wedding in Mykonos. On June 8 2021, Oikonomakou gave birth to their second child, a daughter Sienna-Electra. In 2024, their divorce was publicly announced.

In 2024, Oikonomakou began dating Italian-Argentine basketball player, Bruno Cerella. The couple got married on May 16 2026, in a religious wedding in Athens and on June 17 2026, they exchanged vows in Paros.
