= HVH =

HVH may refer to:

- HVH, initialism for NewYork-Presbyterian Hudson Valley Hospital
- HVH, abbreviation for Sir Hubert von Herkomer Arts Foundation, funded by British actress Helen McCrory
- Hero versus Hero, mode in Guild Wars video game series
- HVH, abbreviation for hypervolemic hemodilution, process in hemodynamics
- Hack vs Hack, a video game term
- Home Video Hellas, producer of Living Dangerously (1987 film)
