= I teleftaia parastasi =

- Genre: Drama; Biographical; Era; Social
- Created by: Frida Mpioumpi
- Based on: The last show
- Written by: Vasilis Spiliopoulos; Maria Athini
- Directed by: Reina Eskenazi
- Starring: Karyofyllia Karampeti; Marina Kalogirou; Giorgos Karamichos; Aris Lempesopoulos
- Theme music composer: Manos Chatzidakis
- Opening theme: O Ithopoios by Karyofyllia Karampeti
- Country of origin: Greece
- Original language: Greek
- No. of seasons: 1
- No. of episodes: 20

Production
- Running time: 45-50 minutes
- Production company: PLD Productions

Original release
- Network: Alpha TV
- Release: October 3, 2006 – March 27, 2007

I teleftaia parastasi (English: The last show) is a Greek biographical drama television series, produced in 2006-2007, based on Frida Mpioumpi's book The last show and presenting the life and work of the well-known Greek actress Elli Lampeti.

The series was broadcast by the television station Alpha TV from October 3, 2006 to March 27, 2007 and consists of 20 episodes. The series presents the events and people that determined the course and life of Elli Lampeti with variations, however, in the names of the protagonists. The role of Elli at a young age was taken by Marina Kalogirou while Elli at a more mature age, specifically from episode 12, is played by Karyofyllia Karampeti.

== Plot ==
The series presents the work and life of the great Greek actress Elli Lontou (Elli Lampeti). The narrative of the series begins with Elli's youth and the age of 17 when she decided to take exams at the National Theater, at the urging of her uncle, and follow the career of an actress. After the first rejection, she began her studies and career at Marika Kotopouli's school where she played her first leading theatrical role. The series then presents her career in the theater as a leading actress and her great loves with various important men of the time. Elli will pass away in the early 1980s in New York after treatment for cancer.

== Cast ==
- Karyofyllia Karampeti as Elli Lontou
- Marina Kalogirou as young Elli Lontou
- Lazaros Georgakopoulos as Theodoros Sgourdelis
- Aris Lempesopoulos as Fred Wakeman
- Giorgos Karamichos as Takis Herman/Dimitris Chorn
- Christos Loulis as Michalis Thalassinos/Marios Ploritis
- Memos Mpegnis as Alekos Alexandrakis
- Iosif Marinakis as Pavlos Pissanos
- Fanis Mouratidis as Giannis Mavros/Kostas Karras
- Nikos Psarras as Giorgos Pappas
- Nikos Mpousdoukos as Kostas Lontos
- Maria Katsiadaki as Anastasia Lontou
- Mary Chinari as Antigoni Lontou
- Annita Kouli as young Antigoni Lontou
- Dimitris Mothonaios as Dimitris Lontos
- Chara Karamani as Foteini Lontou
- Mamili Mpalakli as Koula Lontou
- Othon Metaxas as Spyros Nasiakos
- Tasos Papanastasiou as Tasos Vrettos, Elli's uncle
- Mpety Livanou as Marika Kotopouli, Elli's teacher
- Foteini Mpaxevani as Matina, Marika's assistant at school
- Alexandra Aidini as Vera Vlanti, Elli's friend
- Giorgis Tsampourakis as Antonis Argyriadis
- Elpida Mazaraki as Katerina
- Dimitris Giannopoulos
- Ioanna Pappa as Viky
- Viky Papadopoulou as Carolina Tyrtaiou
