= The Masked Singer (Greek TV series) =

- Genre: Reality competition
- Based on: Masked Singer by Munhwa Broadcasting Corporation
- Presented by: Sakis Rouvas
- Starring: Elisavet Konstantinidou; Thodoris Marantinis; Nikos Moutsinas; Athina Oikonomakou
- Opening theme: "Who Are You" by The Who
- Country of origin: Greece
- Original language: Greek
- No. of seasons: 1
- No. of episodes: 12

Production
- Executive producer: Aggelos Christopoulos
- Production location: Athens
- Running time: approx. 180 to 200 minutes per episode (including commercials)
- Production company: Acun Medya

Original release
- Network: Skai TV
- Release: 31 March – 2 July 2022

Related
- Masked Singer franchise; King of Mask Singer

The Masked Singer is a Greek reality singing competition television series that premiered on Skai TV on 31 March 2022. It is part of the Masked Singer franchise which began in South Korea and features celebrities singing songs while wearing head-to-toe costumes and face masks concealing their identities. The show is hosted by Sakis Rouvas, the program employs panelists who guess the celebrities' identities by interpreting clues provided to them throughout each season. Elisavet Konstantinidou, Thodoris Marantinis, Nikos Moutsinas and Athina Oikonomakou appear in each episode and vote alongside an audience for their favorite singer after all perform. The least popular is eliminated, taking off their mask to reveal their identity. The first season ended on 2 July 2022 with actor Renos Haralambidis coming in first as "Minotavros" and singer Sarbel coming in second as "Moro".

To prevent their identities from being revealed before each prerecorded episode is broadcast, the program makes extensive use of code names, disguises, non-disclosure agreements, and a team of security guards.

== Format ==
The show features a group of celebrity contestants. In a typical episode, eight contestants each sing a 90-second cover for panelists and an audience anonymously in costume. Hints to their identities are given before and occasionally after each performs. The perennial format is a taped interview with a celebrity's electronically masked voice narrating a video showing cryptic allusions to what they are known for. After performances, and before an elimination, the panelists are given time to speculate each singer's identity out loud and write comments in note binders. They may ask questions and the host may offer additional clues. After performances conclude, the audience and panelists vote for their favorite singer using an electronic device. The least popular contestant then takes off their mask to reveal their identity.

== Production ==
The broadcast format started in South Korea in 2015 as King of Mask Singer. In 2019, it was rumored that Skai TV would air in Greece the format of Masked Singer, that have been aired also in Asia, the United States and in other countries. In November 2019, it was announced that Skai TV would broadcast the show in 2020. The makers of Skai TV were in feverish preparations, as they were preparing to air two talent shows when 2021 came. The two shows were House of Fame and The Masked Singer. However, at the end of the 2020-2021 television season, Skai TV did not air The Masked Singer, but it was announced that would begin airing in 2021-2022 television season. It was announced that Skai TV would start airing the show in February 2022. This particular project was due to air two years ago and in March 2022, the first trailer was seen.

== Panelists and host ==
Current season panelists and host

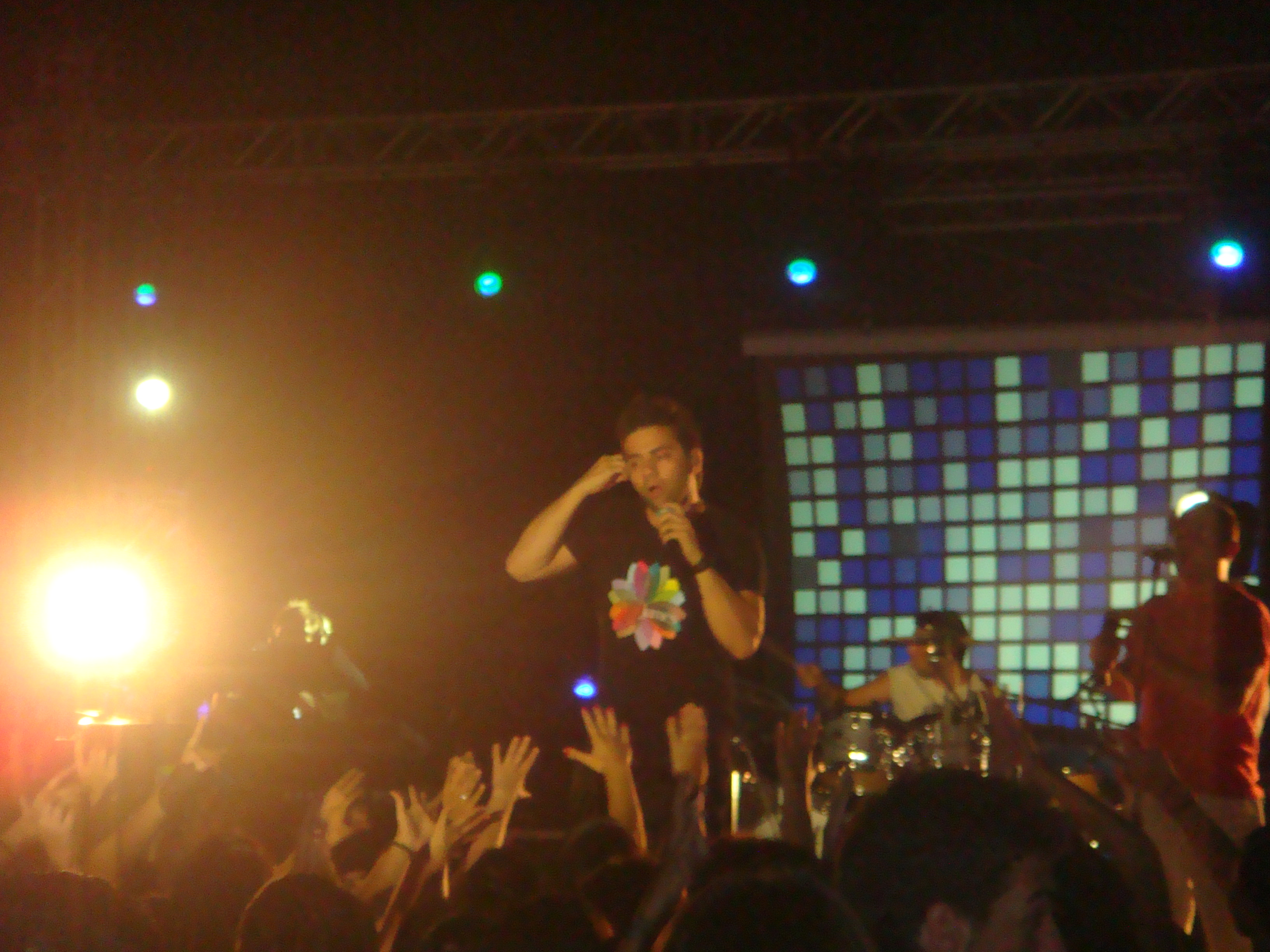
Thodoris Marantinis

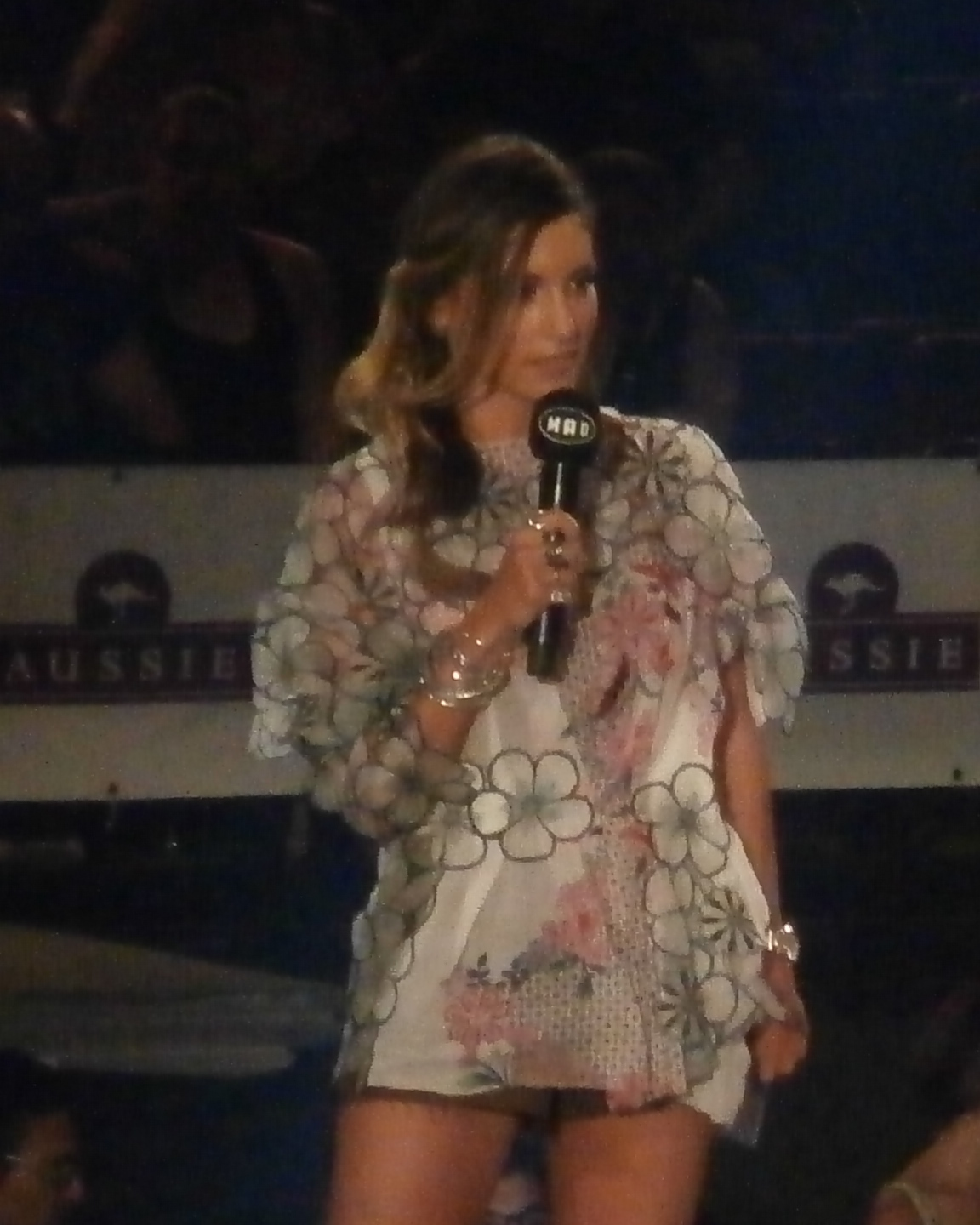
Athina Oikonomakou

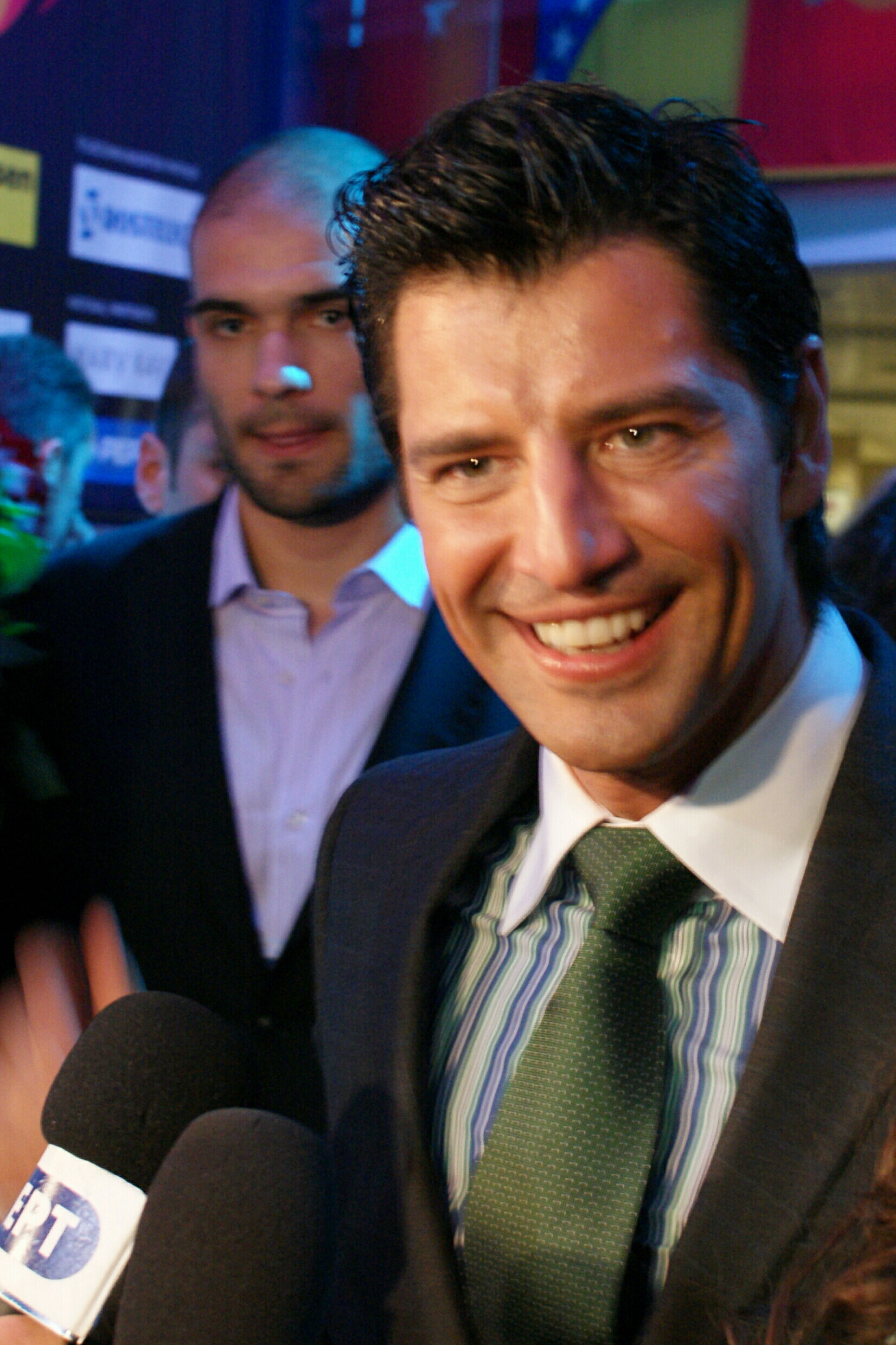
Sakis Rouvas

Several artists were rumored to be part of the panel once Skai TV announced the show. Model Iliana Papageorgiou was rumored as the host of the show, but Skai TV denied the agreement. Then Skai TV announced the singer Sakis Rouvas as the presenter of the show.

It was rumored that singer Harry Varthakouris has already been booked to be on the show as a panelist, as he was already a member of Skai's staff due to Big Brother, while discussions were well underway with TV presenter and actor Nikos Moutsinas, who is also a member of the station's staff, as well as with singer Tamta, singer Eleni Foureira, Giorgos Tsalikis and Phoebus On 21 March 2022, Skai TV announced that the panel would be actress Elisavet Konstantinidou, singer and songwriter Thodoris Marantinis, TV presenter and actor Nikos Moutsinas and actress Athina Oikonomakou.

In the 10th episode, Katerina Stikoudi was a guest and sang as the Skiachtro, she was immediately unmasked after her performance. For the rest of the episode she was the guest panelist.

== Contestants ==
Results
Stage name	Celebrity	Notability	Episodes											
Stage name	Celebrity	Notability	1	2	3	4	5	6	7	8	9	10	11	12
Minotavros (Minotaur)	Renos Haralambidis	Actor	SAFE	SAFE	SAFE	SAFE	SAFE	SAFE	SAFE	SAFE	SAFE	SAFE	SAFE	WINNER
Moro (Baby) (WC)	Sarbel	Singer		SAFE	SAFE	SAFE	SAFE	SAFE	SAFE	SAFE	SAFE	SAFE	SAFE	RUNNER-UP
Pagotó (Ice Cream) (WC)	Natalia Dragoumi	Actress						SAFE	SAFE	SAFE	SAFE	SAFE	SAFE	THIRD
Amforéas (Amphora) (WC)	Ivan Svitailo	Actor							SAFE	SAFE	SAFE	SAFE	OUT	
Cyber Girl	Maria Korinthiou	Actress	SAFE	SAFE	SAFE	SAFE	SAFE	SAFE	SAFE	SAFE	SAFE	OUT		
Pápia (Duck) (WC)	Dorotea Mercouri	Actress					SAFE	SAFE	SAFE	SAFE	OUT			
Gorilas (Gorilla)	Penelope Anastasopoulou	Actress	SAFE	SAFE	SAFE	SAFE	SAFE	SAFE	SAFE	OUT				
Pop Corn	Christos Cholidis	Singer	SAFE	SAFE	SAFE	SAFE	SAFE	SAFE	OUT					
Margaríta (Daisy) (WC)	Michalis Seitis	Paralympic athlete				SAFE	SAFE	OUT						
Tsolias (Evzone)	Konstantinos Kazakos	Actor	SAFE	SAFE	SAFE	SAFE	OUT							
Achinos (Sea Urchin) (WC)	Gogo Tsamba	Singer			SAFE	OUT								
Cyclopas (Cyclops)	Memos Mpegnis	Actor	SAFE	SAFE	OUT									
Melissa (Bee)	Kostas Martakis	Singer	SAFE	OUT										
Ippopotamos (Hippo)	Christina Souzi	Meteorologist	OUT											
Skiáchtro (Scarecrow)	Katerina Stikoudi	Singer										GUEST		

The masked singer was safe from elimination.
The mask was a guest and was immediately unmasked after their performance.
The masked singer was eliminated from the competition and unmasked upon their elimination.
The masked singer did not perform.

(WC) This masked singer is a wild card contestant.

== Episodes ==
=== Week 1 (31 March) ===
Performances on the first episode
#	Stage name	Song	Identity	Result
1	Gorilla	"Levitating" by Dua Lipa feat. DaBaby	undisclosed	SAFE
2	Pop Corn	"Telika" by Konstantinos Argyros feat. Rack	undisclosed	SAFE
3	Minotaur	"Beggin'" by Måneskin	undisclosed	SAFE
4	Cyber Girl	"Caramela" by Eleni Foureira	undisclosed	SAFE
5	Bee	"Blinding Lights" by The Weeknd	undisclosed	SAFE
6	Evzone	"Let Me Entertain You" by Robbie Williams	undisclosed	SAFE
7	Hippo	"Crazy Girl" by Mimis Plessas	Christina Souzi	OUT
8	Cyclops	"Can't Take My Eyes Off You" by Frankie Valli	undisclosed	SAFE

=== Week 2 (7 April) ===
Performances on the second episode
#	Stage name	Song	Identity	Result
Wildcard	Baby	"Dynata (Ta Ta Ta)" by Stefanos Pitsiniagas	undisclosed	SAFE
1	Cyclops	"O Horos (Klise Ta Matia)" by Onirama	undisclosed	SAFE
2	Gorilla	"I Sklava" by Tzeni Vanou	undisclosed	SAFE
3	Evzone	"Dance with Somebody" by Mando Diao	undisclosed	SAFE
4	Minotaur	"Pou na vro mia na sou moiazei" by Kostis Maraveyas	undisclosed	SAFE
5	Bee	"Ola S'agapane" by Stamatis Gonidis	Kostas Martakis	OUT
6	Cyber Girl	"Zeibekiko (M' Aeroplana kai Vaporia)" by Sotiria Bellou	undisclosed	SAFE
7	Pop Corn	"Eimai Allou" by Melisses	undisclosed	SAFE

=== Week 3 (14 April) ===
Performances on the third episode
#	Stage name	Song	Identity	Result
Wildcard	Sea Urchin	"Ta Kalitera Paidhia" by Josephine	undisclosed	SAFE
1	Baby	"Eimai Enas Allos" by Nino	undisclosed	SAFE
2	Cyclops	"Eye of the Tiger" by Survivor	Memos Mpegnis	OUT
3	Gorilla	"Re!" by Anna Vissi	undisclosed	SAFE
4	Pop Corn	"Magiko Hali" by Locomondo	undisclosed	SAFE
5	Evzone	"As kratisoun oi Khoroi" by Dionysis Savvopoulos	undisclosed	SAFE
6	Minotaur	"You Can Leave Your Hat On" by Randy Newman	undisclosed	SAFE
7	Cyber Girl	"I Love It" by Icona Pop feat. Charli XCX	undisclosed	SAFE

=== Week 4 (28 April) ===
Performances on the fourth episode
#	Stage name	Song	Identity	Result
Wildcard	Daisy	"S' Agapo" by Marinella	undisclosed	SAFE
1	Pop Corn	"They Don't Care About Us" by Michael Jackson	undisclosed	SAFE
2	Sea Urchin	"S'Echo Kanei Theo" by Katerina Stanisi	Gogo Tsamba	OUT
3	Gorilla	"The Show Must Go On" by Queen	undisclosed	SAFE
4	Cyber Girl	"Gia Sena" by Anna Vissi	undisclosed	SAFE
5	Evzone	"Hippy Hippy Shake" by The Swinging Blue Jeans	undisclosed	SAFE
6	Minotaur	"Min Andistekese" by Sakis Rouvas	undisclosed	SAFE
7	Baby	"Physical" by Dua Lipa	undisclosed	SAFE

=== Week 5 (5 May) ===
Performances on the fifth episode
#	Stage name	Song	Identity	Result
Wildcard	Duck	"Dancing Queen" by ABBA	undisclosed	SAFE
1	Minotaur	"Diamanti" by Snik	undisclosed	SAFE
2	Cyber Girl	"Ela Ela" by Lena Zevgara	undisclosed	SAFE
3	Daisy	"Another Brick in the Wall" by Pink Floyd	undisclosed	SAFE
4	Baby	"Fuego" by Eleni Foureira	undisclosed	SAFE
5	Evzone	"Kataigida" by Antypas	Konstantinos Kazakos	OUT
6	Gorilla	"Xero Ti Zitao" by Hi-5	undisclosed	SAFE
7	Pop Corn	"Valto Terma" by Nikos Oikonomopoulos	undisclosed	SAFE

=== Week 6 (21 May) ===
Performances on the sixth episode
#	Stage name	Song	Identity	Result
Wildcard	Ice Cream	"Bad Romance" by Lady Gaga	undisclosed	SAFE
1	Gorilla	"Anoixe Petra" by Marinella	undisclosedg	SAFE
2	Baby	"Livin' la Vida Loca" by Ricky Martin	undisclosed	SAFE
3	Duck	"S' agapo" by Mariada Pieridi	undisclosed	SAFE
4	Pop Corn	"My Way" by Frank Sinatra	undisclosed	SAFE
5	Daisy	"Margarites" by Angela Dimitriou	Michalis Seitis	OUT
6	Minotaur	"Caruso" by Lucio Dalla	undisclosed	SAFE
7	Cyber Girl	"Deja Vu" by Helena Paparizou feat. Marseaux	undisclosed	SAFE

=== Week 7 (28 May) ===
Performances on the seventh episode
#	Stage name	Song	Identity	Result
Wildcard	Amphora	"Believer" by Imagine Dragons	undisclosed	SAFE
1	Gorilla	"I Anixi" by Sophia Vossou	undisclosed	SAFE
2	Pop Corn	"Can't Stop the Feeling!" by Justin Timberlake	Christos Cholidis	OUT
3	Ice Cream	"Pio Psila" by Vegas	undisclosed	SAFE
4	Minotaur	"El Ritmo Psicodélico" by Eleni Foureira / "Gasolina" by Daddy Yankee	undisclosed	SAFE
5	Cyber Girl	"Let's Get Loud" by Jennifer Lopez	undisclosed	SAFE
6	Baby	"Apopse Stis Akrogialies" by Charoula Lampraki	undisclosed	SAFE
7	Duck	"Zitti e buoni" by Måneskin	undisclosed	SAFE

=== Week 8 (4 June) ===
Performances on the eighth episode
#	Stage name	Song	Identity	Result
1	Baby	"Moves like Jagger" by Maroon 5 feat. Christina Aguilera	undisclosed	SAFE
2	Duck	"A Pa Pa" by Despina Vandi	undisclosed	SAFE
3	Amphora	"American Woman" by The Guess Who	undisclosed	SAFE
4	Gorilla	"Ola Gyro Sou Gyrizoun" by Sakis Rouvas	Penelope Anastasopoulou	OUT
5	Minotaur	"Flashdance... What a Feeling" by Irene Cara	undisclosed	SAFE
6	Ice Cream	"To Kati Pou Echeis" by Eleni Foureira	undisclosed	SAFE
7	Cyber Girl	"(You Drive Me) Crazy" by Britney Spears	undisclosed	SAFE

=== Week 9 (11 June) ===
Performances on the ninth episode
#	Stage name	Song	Identity	Result
1	Cyber Girl	"I Kissed A Girl" by Katy Perry	undisclosed	SAFE
2	Duck	"Yes Sir, I Can Boogie" by Baccara	Dorotea Mercouri	OUT
3	Minotaur	"Evaisthisíes" by Katy Garbi	undisclosed	SAFE
4	Ice Cream	"Can't Get You out of My Head" by Kylie Minogue	undisclosed	SAFE
5	Baby	"S' Agapáo Sou Fónaxa" by Petros Iakovidis	undisclosed	SAFE
6	Amphora	"Athína Mou" by Konstantinos Argyros	undisclosed	SAFE

=== Week 10 (18 June) ===
Performances on the tenth episode
#	Stage name	Song	Identity	Result
1	Scarecrow	"Are You Gonna Go My Way" by Lenny Kravitz	Katerina Stikoudi	GUEST
2	Ice Cream	"Ta Koritsia Χenihtane" by Alexia Vassiliou	undisclosed	SAFE
3	Baby	"Rise Like a Phoenix" by Conchita Wurst	undisclosed	SAFE
4	Cyber Girl	"Stihimatizo" by Manto	Maria Korinthiou	OUT
5	Minotaur	"Peirazei Pou Eimai Firma" by Giannis Floriniotis	undisclosed	SAFE
6	Amphora	"The Way You Make Me Feel" by Michael Jackson	undisclosed	SAFE

=== Week 11 (25 June) ===
Performances on the eleventh episode
#	Stage name	Song	Identity	Result
1	Minotaur	"Hristougenna" by Despina Vandi	undisclosed	SAFE
2	Minotaur	"Madame" by Kings and Trannos	undisclosed	SAFE
3	Ice Cream	"Ego" by Josephine	undisclosed	SAFE
4	Ice Cream	"Pou isoun Chtes" by Onirama	undisclosed	SAFE
5	Amphora	"Kalos Sas Vrika" by Giorgos Mazonakis	Ivan Svitailo	OUT
6	Amphora	“(I've Had) The Time of My Life” by Bill Medley and Jennifer Warnes	Ivan Svitailo	OUT
7	Baby	"Vrehi Fotia sti strata mou" by Stratos Dionysiou	undisclosed	SAFE
8	Baby	"It's Raining Men" by The Weather Girls	undisclosed	SAFE

=== Week 12 - Final (2 July) ===
Performances on the twelfth episode
#	Stage name	Song	Identity	Result
Round 1
1	Minotaur	"I Agapi Moy Stin Ikaria" by Vaggelis Konitopoulos	undisclosed	SAFE
1	Minotaur	"Tosa Kalokairia" by Dakis	undisclosed	SAFE
2	Baby	"...Baby One More Time" by Britney Spears	undisclosed	SAFE
2	Baby	"Last Kiss" by Ishtar	undisclosed	SAFE
3	Ice Cream	"Ximeromata" by Konstantinos Argyros	Natalia Dragoumi	THIRD
3	Ice Cream	"Anaveis Foties" by Despina Vandi	Natalia Dragoumi	THIRD
Round 2
4	Minotaur	"Min Andistekese" by Sakis Rouvas	Renos Haralambidis	WINNER
5	Baby	"Dynata (Ta Ta Ta)" by Stéfanos Pitsiniagkas	Sarbel	RUNNER-UP

== Ratings ==
Episode		Date	Timeslot (EET)	Ratings	Viewers (in millions)	Rank Daily	Share		Source
Episode		Date	Timeslot (EET)	Ratings	Viewers (in millions)	Rank Daily	Household	Adults 18-54	Source
1	Week 1: "Season Premiere"	31 March 2022	Thursday 9:00pm	6.6%	0.680	#8	14.1%	18.5%	
2	Week 2	7 April 2022	Thursday 9:00pm	—N/a^{2}			9.4%	10.4%	
3	Week 3	14 April 2022	Thursday 9:00pm	4.7%	0.491	#10	10.7%	12.4%	
4	Week 4	28 April 2022	Thursday 9:00pm	4.9%	0.507	#7	11.8%	11.7%	
5	Week 5	5 May 2022	Thursday 9:00pm	—N/a^{2}			8.1%	7.4%	
6	Week 6	21 May 2022	Saturday 9:00pm	4.1%	0.425	#2	12.3%	12.1%	
7	Week 7	28 May 2022	Saturday 9:00pm	3.8%	0.391	#7	11.2%	8.7%	
8	Week 8	4 June 2022	Saturday 9:00pm	4.0%	0.409	#2	13.6%	13.5%	
9	Week 9	11 June 2022	Saturday 9:00pm	4.5%	0.465	#2	13.0%	10.3%	
10	Week 10	18 June 2022	Saturday 9:00pm	4.2%	0.430	#6	13.5%	11.8%	
11	Week 11	25 June 2022	Saturday 9:00pm	3.6%	0.375	#6	13.2%	10.9%	
12	Week 12: "Season Finale"	2 July 2022	Saturday 9:00pm	4.1%	0.420	#3	15.8%	12.9%	

Note

1. Outside top 20.
