= The Bubble (2002 film) =

2001 Greek film directed by Nikos Perakis

I Phouska
- Directed by: Nikos Perakis
- Written by: Nikos Perakis; Katerina Bei
- Produced by: Dimitris Papadimitriou
- Starring: Maria Solomou; Alexis Georgoulis
- Cinematography: Giorgos Arguroiliopoulos
- Edited by: Yorgos Mavropsaridis
- Music by: Dimitris Papadimitriou
- Release date: January 2, 2002
- Running time: 104 minutes
- Country: Greece
- Language: Greek

The Bubble (Greek: Η Φούσκα / I Phouska) is a 2002 Greek film. The film is directed by Nikos Perakis and stars Maria Solomou and Alexis Georgoulis. The film took part in the Thessaloniki Film Festival.

== Plot summary ==
Makis Alexis Georgoulis, a man with difficulties in the stock market, falls for Roula (Maria Solomou), who is the mistress of a big tycoon Manolas (Ilias Logothetis), which Makis has invested in. Makis becomes witness to an assassination gone wrong. The police are after him thinking he is the shooter but the real assassin is after Makis to recruit him to his terrorist beliefs. The only comfort Makis can find is Roula who follows him on his deadly adventure.

== Cast ==
- Alexis Georgoulis as Makis
- Maria Solomou as Roula
- Yannis Bostantzoglou as Manolas
- Ilias Logothetis as Spartacos

== Sources ==
- Page on The Bubble on the director's homepage.
- The Chicago Reader.
- Review by Nestoras Poulakos.

Further reading

- Film Festival 2002
