= Nikos Perakis =

Greek writer and film director (born 1944)

- Born: 11 September 1944 (age 81); Alexandria, Egypt

Nikos Perakis (Greek: Νίκος Περάκης; born 11 September 1944) is a Greek writer and film director. He studied at the Fine Arts Academy of Munich. At that time he worked as a set and costume designer. His 1984 film Loafing and Camouflage was featured in the 35th Berlin International Film Festival.

== Filmography ==
- Lina Braake (dir. Bernhard Sinkel, 1975)
- Bomber & Paganini (1976)
- Milo Milo (1979)
- Arpa Colla (1982)
- Loafing and Camouflage (1984)
- BIOS kai Politeia (1987)
- Prostatis Oikogenias (1997)
- Thiliki etairia (1999)
- The Bubble (2001)
- H Lisa kai oloi oi alloi (2003)
- Loafing and Camouflage: Sirens in the Aegean (2005)
- Psyxraimia (2007)
- Artherapy (2010)
- Loafing and Camouflage: Sirens at Land (2011)
