= Nikos Moutsinas =

Greek actor

- Born: 6 September 1977 (age 48); Thessaloniki, Greece
- Occupations: Television host, actor, screenwriter, director
- Years active: 1999–present

Nikos Moutsinas (Greek: Νίκος Μουτσινάς, born 6 September 1977) is a Greek television host and actor.

== Career ==
He studied acting at Vasilis Diamantopoulos' IASMOS school in Thessaloniki. He has also attended dance classes at the school of Diana Theodoridou and has graduated from the State I.E.K. of Thessaloniki and the Theatrical Workshop "Thespis".

When he went to Athens, he became better known to the public through his participation in the show Kous Kous to mesimeri on Alpha TV in 2005–2007 and in 2006 he presented together with Natalia Germanou the game show Soundmix Show. In 2008 he participated in the morning show Omorfos Kosmos to proi with Grigoris Arnaoutoglou and Sissi Christidou. The following year, in 2009, he co-presented with Katerina Zarifi on ANT1's Proinos Kafes, a collaboration that failed after the channel terminated their collaboration mid-season. The following year he returned to Alpha TV where he collaborated with Eleni Menegaki in the 2009–2010 season on her show Kafes me tin Eleni.

In the period 2009–2014 he was the main presenter together with Maria Iliaki in the TV show Deste tous!. From 2014 to 2016 he was on ANT1 as he starred in the TV show Trixes, while he co-starred with Maria Bekatorou in Proino SouKou and in 2016 he returned again to Alpha TV through the show Xanadeste tous! which was cut on 24 February 2017.

In the 2017–2018 season he starred in ANT1's comedy series Kati Xorismena Palikaria, while in February 2018 he co-starred on the same channel with Zeta Makripoulia in the evening show Sunday Live which lasted four episodes. At the end of the same year, he returned to television through the newly established channel Open TV, presenting the midday show Gia tin Parea (his biggest success on television after Deste tous!) which premiered on 25 October 2018 (almost a day after the replacement of Epsilon TV in Open Beyond which started its first shows). From 23 September 2019, he presents a remake of the show on Skai TV under the name Kalo Mesimeraki, but with the same team. In March 2022, Moutsinas was announced as a judge for the Greek version of the music game show, The Masked Singer, which will begin airing on Skai TV on 31 March 2022.

Apart from being a presenter, he is also an actor with many successful theatrical performances to his credit such as Sesouar gia Dolofonous, Oi Apelpismeni, Psekasa tin Eliza, Ta Vaftisia, KTEL, Ververitsa, Oi apo Pano etc.

Finally, he has made cameo appearances in the Mega Channel series Maria, i Aschimi, To Kokkino Domatio, Singles 3 and Latremenoi Mou Geitones.

== Filmography ==
=== Television ===
Year	Title	Role(s)	Notes
1999	Like sisters	image maker	1 episode
1999	Τhe neighborhood's children	dancer	2 episodes
2001	Karabela Family	photo editor	1 episode
2001–2002	Nirvana	Nikos	Main role, 26 episodes
2004–2005	Breakfast Kous Kous	Himself (co-host)	Daytime morning talk show on ALPHA; also reporter
2005–2007	Kous Kous in the Afternoon	Himself (co-host)	Daytime tabloid talk show on ALPHA; season 1-2
2006–2007	Soundmix Show	Himself (host)	Talent show
2007	Ugly Maria	Nikos	2 episodes
2007–2008	Beautiful World in the Morning	Himself (co-host)	Daytime morning talk show on MEGA; season 5
2008	My Beloved Neighbors	Nikos	1 episode
2008	The Red Suite	Christos Michael	Episodes: "Green Card"
2008	Singles 3	Himself	Episode: "The battle of the sexes"
2008	Lola	Himself	1 episode
2008–2009	Morning Coffee	Himself (host)	Daytime morning talk show on ANT1; season 20
2009–2010	Coffee with Eleni Menegaki	Himself (co-host)	Daytime morning talk show on ALPHA; season 5
2009–2014	Watch them!	Himself (host)	Daytime variety comedy talk show on ALPHA; also co-creator
2013–2014	Νick O' Clock	Himself (host)	Variety comedy talk show on ALPHA; also creator
2014–2015	Hair	Tasos Karadanos	Lead role, 22 episodes
2015–2016	Breakfast Sou Kou	Himself (co-host)	Weekend morning talk show on ANT1; season 2
2016–2017	Your Face Sounds Familiar	Himself (judge)	Season 3–4
2016–2017	Watch them again!	Himself (host)	Daytime variety comedy talk show on ALPHA; also creator
2017–2018	Some Broken Lads	Minas Eliades	Lead role, 80 episodes
2018	Sunday Live	Himself (host)	Variety comedy talk show; also co-creator (4 episodes)
2018–2019	For Friends with Nikos Moutsinas	Himself (host)	Daytime variety comedy talk show on OPEN; also creator
2019–2023	Really Happy Afternoon with Nikos Moutsinas	Himself (host)	Daytime variety comedy talk show on SKAI; also creator
2020	My Style Rocks	Herself (guest judge)	Gala 1; season 3
2020	Without hesitation	Nikolas	1 episode
2022	The Masked Singer	Himself (judge)	Season 1
2024	Nikos Moutsinas At Night	Himself (host)	Late night talk show on ALPHA; also creator
2025	Very awful ideas	writer in cafe	2 episodes
2026–present	Lingo	Himself (host)	Weekend game show on STAR

=== Film ===
Year	Title	Role	Notes	Ref.
2001	Crying... Silicon Tears	luthier	Film debut	

== Theatrography ==
Year	Title of performance	Venue
2009–2010	Sesouar gia Dolofonous	Theatro Apothiki
2011 (Summer)	Oi Apelpismeni	Theatro Athina
2011–2012	Psekasa tin Eliza	Theatro Choma
2012–2013	Ta Vaftisia	Theatro Kivotos
2012–2013	Ta Vaftisia	Summer Tour
2013–2014	KTEL	Theatro Kivotos
2014 (Summer)	KTEL	Theatro RADIO CITY Thessaloniki
2016	Kokomploko	Summer Tour
2016–2017	Oi apo Pano	Theatro Piraeus 131
2018–2019	Ververitsa	Theatro Vretania
2014 (Summer)	Ververitsa	Summer Tour
2019–2020	Ververitsa Reloaded	Theatro Labeti
