= Loafing and Camouflage =

- Directed by: Nikos Perakis
- Written by: Nikos Perakis
- Produced by: Nikos Perakis
- Cinematography: George Panoussopoulos
- Music by: Nicos Mamangakis
- Production companies: Greek Film Centre (GFC); Filmakers Corporation Ltd.
- Release date: 1984
- Running time: 99 minutes
- Country: Greece
- Language: Greek

Loafing and Camouflage (Greek: Λούφα και Παραλλαγή, romanized: Lufa kai Paralagi; 1984) is a Greek comedy film directed by Nikos Perakis. It was followed by the motion picture Living Dangerously (Greek: BiOS + πολιτεία, romanized: BiOS + politeia; 1987), bringing the characters in a post-20 year "reunion". In 2005, Loafing and Camouflage: Sirens in the Aegean was released, bearing no relation to the first installment; instead, telling the story of a modern-day Army company. A TV series version of the movie aired for two seasons, featuring actors from the latest L&C movie in the roles of the original characters from the 1984 installment.

== Plot ==
The film tells the story of a group of soldiers, who, during their compulsory military service in 1967 and 1968, before and during the Greek Junta, are assigned to the then-recently-founded Armed Forces Television. This TV station, founded for the civilian population, was run by the Army Cinematographic Unit which until then had only produced propaganda films and newsreels and was responsible for entertaining the troops and other charity organizations with movie screenings. The personnel was composed mostly of soldiers, who already had experience in the film business in their civilian lives, as well as those who received their training in the army.

The setting, characters and situations portrayed in the film are largely autobiographical. During his military service, Perakis helped set up the experimental Armed Forces Television station in the premises of the Hellenic Military Geographical Service, and the film shows a fictionalized account of this period.

== Cast ==
- Nikos Kalogeropoulos as Private Giannis Papadopoulos
- Giorgos Kimoulis as Corporal Achilleas Lambrou
- Takis Spyridakis as Private Panagiotis Balourdos
- Fotis Polychronopoulos as Private Michail Karamanos, aka Karamazov
- Giannis Chatziyannis as Private Petros Savidis
- Paris Tselios as Private Marlafekas
- Stavros Xenidis as Colonel A. Kontellis
- Andreas Filippidis as Lieutenant Colonel Minas Katsampelas
- Christos Valavanidis Major D. Karavidis
- Antonis Theodorakopoulos as Captain
- Nikos Tsachiridis as Sergeant Major
- Tania Kapsali as Emmanouella Dimaki
- Ifigenia Makati as Katerina Papadopoulou
- Rocky Taylor as Cindy
- Dimitris Poulikakos as John Papaloukas
- Michalis Maniatis as Mr. Karlatos
- Ira Papamichail as Soula
- Vasiliki Rorri as Katsampelas's Daughter

== Awards ==
- Special Mention, 1985, Thessaloniki International Film Festival
- Grand Prix, 1984, Thessaloniki International Film Festival
- Best Screenplay, 1984, Thessaloniki International Film Festival
- Best Actor, 1984, Thessaloniki International Film Festival
- Best Editing, 1984, Thessaloniki International Film Festival
- Golden Bear, Nominated, 35th Berlin International Film Festival

== Sequels ==
The film was followed by a sequel entitled Living Dangerously (Greek: BiOS + πολιτεία, romanized: BiOS + politeia; 1987), filmed 3 years later and which, according to Nikos Perakis, complements his experiences from his service in the army at the beginning of the Dictatorship, which he could not fit into the first film.
