= Loafing and Camouflage: Sirens at Land =

- Directed by: Nikos Perakis
- Written by: Nikos Perakis
- Produced by: Manos Krezias; Kostas Lambropoulos; Dionyssis Samiotis
- Starring: Yannis Tsimitselis; George Seitaridis; Ioannis Papazisis
- Music by: Dimitris Kontopoulos
- Release date: October 27, 2011
- Running time: 101 minutes
- Language: Greek

Loafing and Camouflage: Sirens at Land is a 2011 film and the third to bear the "Loafing & Camo" stamp. It is the only in the series which is not military-themed. The film stars the cast of previous film Loafing and Camouflage: Sirens in the Aegean 8 years later.

== Plot ==
After the mysterious kidnapping of Noori, a 12-year-old orphan Pakistani protégée, from Crete, Stavromathiakakis follows her traces. The traces lead him to the capital of Athens, during the 2011 anti-austerity protests.

Parlavatzas has opened a restaurant chain company called "Sevdali" with Papadakis as his chef. Nakos is a hacktivist and also participates in a gang of "Super Market Robin Hoods". Kalouris who is now a new member of the city council struggles to upgrade the city's cultural profile. Tsibitzidis has become a motivational speaker "guru" giving self -esteem lessons to his supporters and to the Ministry's Council part of which is his "ex" and Vice Minister Marialena.

== Cast ==
- Yannis Tsimitselis .... Tzibitzidis
- George Seitaridis .... Parlavatzas
- Ioannis Papazisis .... Kalouris
- Orfeas Avgoustidis .... Stavrakomathiakakis
- Socratis Patsikas .... Nakos
- Stelios Ksanthoudakis .... Papadakis
- Renos Haralambidis .... Makris
- Vicky Kaya .... Marialena
- Tzeni Theona
- Eleftheria Komi
- Despoina Mavroeidi
- Rasmi Soukouli
