= Sofia...Orthi =

- Genre: Comedy
- Created by: Giorgos Konstantinou
- Written by: Giorgos Konstantinou; Nikos Vergetis
- Directed by: Giorgos Konstantinou; Nikos Vergetis
- Starring: Apostolos Gkletsos; Sophia Aliberti; Elena Tsavalia; Maria Konstantarou
- Opening theme: "Call Me Mister Tibbs" by Quincy Jones
- Ending theme: "Call Me Mister Tibbs" by Quincy Jones
- Country of origin: Greece
- Original language: Greek
- No. of seasons: 2
- No. of episodes: 51

Production
- Producers: Nikos Vergetis; Spotlight
- Production locations: Athens, Greece
- Running time: 26-30 minutes

Original release
- Network: ANT1
- Release: 1995 – 1997

Sofia...Orthi is a Greek comedy series on ANT1 that aired in the 1995-1996 and 1996-1997 television seasons, directed by Giorgos Konstantinou and written by him in collaboration with Nikos Vergetis.

== Plot ==
Sofia is a physician. She has been married for about six months and has been married for a year. Her husband, Tasos, is a model photographer. They met, fell in love and got married very quickly. Sofia works endless hours trying to establish herself in the medical field. However, this professional dedication has serious consequences for her family life. She runs to the hospital and her patients almost 24 hours a day, while at the same time having to take care of her husband and home, and meet their various family obligations. The dissatisfaction of her husband, as well as her in-laws, is obvious. Snobs, rich and aristocrats, Tasos' parents make her life difficult, especially every time they visit her and she anxiously tries to portray the perfect wife. Of course, the couple's love life is not carefree either. Tasos wants children, Sofia doesn't have time.

== Cast ==
- Sophia Aliberti as Sofia Spathi
- Apostolos Gkletsos as Tasos Spathis
- Maria Konstantarou as Milva Spathi
- Elena Tsavalia as Magdalini
- Kostas Palios as Hospital director
- Nikos Garoufallou as Director Tompolas
- Giorgos Douris as Aristos
- Giorgos Vrasivanopoulos as Aristeidis Spathis
- Evelina Papoulia as Lora Katoumani
- Nikos Magdalinos as Louis
- Fryni Arvaniti as Head nurse
- Aias Manthopoulos as Deputy Director Seras
