= Magic Hour (2011 film) =

2011 film

- Film poster
- Directed by: Costas Kapakas
- Written by: Costas Kapakas
- Produced by: Costas Kapakas
- Starring: Renos Haralambidis; Tasos Antoniou
- Cinematography: Yannis Daskalothanasis
- Release date: 19 April 2011
- Running time: 95 minutes
- Country: Greece
- Language: Greek

Magic Hour is a 2011 Greek road movie written and directed by Costas Kapakas.

== Cast ==
- Renos Haralambidis as Diomidis
- Tasos Antoniou as Aristeidis
