= Loafing and Camouflage: Sirens in the Aegean =

- Directed by: Nikos Perakis
- Written by: Nikos Perakis
- Produced by: Manos Krezias; Kostas Lambropoulos
- Music by: Dimitris Kontopoulos
- Release date: 2005
- Running time: 99 min
- Languages: Greek; English; Turkish
- Box office: $11,680,950

Loafing and Camouflage: Sirens in the Aegean is a 2005 motion picture and the second to bear the "Loafing & Camo" stamp (the first being Loafing and Camouflage by Nikos Perakis), although in fact it has nothing to do with that production beyond the military environment. The original sequel to Loafing and Camouflage (1984) was the 1987 film "Living Dangerously" by the same director. The film stars an ensemble cast of Greek and Turkish actors. In 2011, the film "Loafing and Camouflage: Sirens at Land" features the reunion of the cast 8 years later.

== Plot ==
This army satire follows a small group of Greek Army soldiers in the island of Kos, when they are assigned to spend a few days guarding a small rock island named Pitta to defend an alleged invasion from Turkish troops. After their arrival in Pitta, everything looked normal until a Turkish boat (sent there for a modeling photo shooting) disembarked 4 castaways on Pitta. Amongst the models was the niece of a Turkish Admiral, which made things more complicated when the Turkish authorities started looking for them. The protagonists did not know what to do since a diplomatic incident could be inevitable. The outcome is the involvement of both countries in the incident resulting in several comic situations.

== Reception ==
=== Critical response ===
The movie received mixed to positive reviews from film critics, with an average score of 6/10 based on 577 reviews.

=== Box office ===
The movie was a box office success, earning $11,680,950.

== Cast ==
- Yannis Tsimitselis .... Alexandros Tzibitzidis
- George Seitaridis .... Charalambis "Chambos" Parlavatzas
- Ioannis Papazisis .... Denis Kalouris
- Orfeas Avgoustidis .... Minos "Survivor" Stavrakomathiakakis
- Socratis Patsikas .... Stefanos Nakos
- Stelios Ksanthoudakis .... Manolis Papadakis
- Vassilis Haralabopoulos .... Bakakos
- Renos Haralambidis .... Xenofon Makris
- Vicky Kaya .... Marialena Georgiadou
- Tuğçe Kazaz .... Havva
- Arzu Yanardağ .... Sevda
- Müge Bakırcıoğlu .... Pinar
- Metin Belgin .... Osman
- Aris Bafaloukas .... Gouvelis
- Apostolis Totsikas .... Panos Livadas
- Yetkin Dikinciler .... Kenan
- Turgay Tanülkü .... Turgut
- Nizam Madak .... Helih
- Khan Farzana .... Nouri
- Ram Satoop .... Haroon Hameed
- Ahmad Habach .... Cemal
