= Living Dangerously (1987 film) =

- Directed by: Nikos Perakis
- Written by: Nikos Perakis
- Produced by: Nikos Perakis
- Starring: Giorgos Kimoulis; Dimitris Kalivokas; Georgos Kotanidis; Takis Moschos; Pavlos Kontogiannidis; Vana Barba; Dimitris Poulikakos; Alkis Panagiotidis
- Cinematography: Giorgos Panousopoulos
- Edited by: Giannis Tsitsopoulos
- Music by: Nikos Mamagakis
- Production companies: Stefi II; Home Video Hellas (HVH); Hellenic Film Center (ECC); Spentzos Film
- Release date: 1987
- Running time: 105 minutes
- Country: Greece
- Language: Greek

Living Dangerously (Greek: BiOS + πολιτεία, romanized: BiOS + politeia) is a 1987 Greek film written, produced and directed by Nikos Perakis. It is a pessimistic comedy about the decline of the ideological values of the Polytechnic generation. The film deals with the comedic side of Greek society and politics in the 1980s. The film won the Editing Award at the Thessaloniki Film Festival in 1987 and the State Quality Award of the Ministry of Culture for Best Actor.

The film is a sequel to the film Loafing and Camouflage, set 20 years later.

== Plot ==
Michalis Karamanos (Georgos Kimoulis), an expatriate from Tashkent, is a genius electronics engineer who works at the Greek Telecommunications Organization (TOE) (an obvious reference to OTE). One day he enters the office of the director of TOE (Dimitris Kallivokas), takes him hostage and demands that he deliver a speech on state television denouncing "government policy and citizen-state relations", ten minutes before the broadcast of a very important Greek national football match, threatening to blow up the TOE building with an explosive device. The explosive device is connected to a computer, which every 15 minutes poses a problem that, if not answered, will detonate the bomb. The problems are too difficult and technical for only Karamanos to answer. The police, during a search of his home, discover that he has no friends and that his closest people were those with whom he served in the army during the Dictatorship (see Loofah and variant). So he begins a campaign to find them and get them to convince him. As it is later revealed, most of them are now well-suited to the system.

Savvidis (Georgos Kotanidis), who was a "plug" in the army, is now the minister's right-hand man. Balourdos (Pavlos Kontogiannidis), who was a driver in the army, is now the president of the taxi drivers. He remains an eternal troublemaker (e.g. when the police order pizzas, he also asks for a pack of cigarettes). Lambrou (Takis Moschos) has his own advertising company, specializing in promoting political parties (spin doctor). Marlafekas (Alkis Panagiotidis) is an artistic director at the theater and puts on kitsch music and dance shows, that is, things he used to make fun of. On stage at the theater, director Pantelis Voulgaris also makes a quick cameo, playing the director of the show. Papadopoulos (Dimitris Poulikakos) continues to make pornographic films with his wife, just like when he was a soldier, only now he has enlisted his daughters. Of all of them, he was the only one who was politicized during the Junta. Now all his rebelliousness seems to be limited to a libertarian lifestyle, cannabis plants on the balcony and porn productions with titles like "The Kitten of Exarchia." Throughout the film, he wears a T-shirt with Melina Mercouri (then Minister of Culture) depicted in the style of Andy Warhol.

During their investigation, the police discover that Michalis Karamanos belongs to the illegal organization "Syagon" (Constitutional Struggle). As it is later revealed, "Syagon" is ultimately an association "registered by the Court of First Instance".

The journalist covering the event (Vana Barba) interviews Karamanos and his superior, who views Karamanos with sympathy and to some extent seems to agree with his views, but the television ultimately distorts the views of both through editing. The same thing is done by a newspaper that publishes a notice from "Syagon", which it had sent them a while ago, distorted of course. As the case progresses, we see more and more people exploiting this situation with the bomb for their own benefit or for personal promotion. Outside the TOE building, a bunch of politicians who constantly make statements on the channels, workers with demands, and even anarchists with banners supporting Karamanos have gathered. At one point, the advertiser Lambrou tries to convince Karamanos, when he finally makes the announcement, to wear a specific t-shirt for indirect advertising.

As the time for the announcement approaches, Karamanos begins to realize that the result will be the opposite of what he wanted and refuses to proceed. Then everyone tries to convince him, because everyone now has an interest in him appearing on television.

Finally, he appears on television but, when he has spoken, he is frozen and says nothing. Everyone gestures for him to speak and finally Karamanos, moved, begins to sing the National Anthem. And then the football match begins.

== Cast ==
Although the film is a sequel to the film Loafing and Camouflage, with the same main characters, the roles are played by different actors, as the events take place 20 years later. The only actors who are common in both films are Rocky Taylor, who plays Cindy, Rita Lambrinou, who plays Lambrou's mother, and Giorgos Kimoulis, who plays a different character in each film. In Loofah and Variation he plays Lambrou, while in BIOS + Politeia he plays Karamanos.

- George Kimoulis: Michalis Karamanos (affectionately known to his colleagues in the army as Karamazov)
- Dimitris Kallivokas: Mavromatis
- George Kotanidis: Petros Savvidis
- Pavlos Kontogiannidis: Panagiotis Balourdos
- Takis Moschos: Achilleas Lambrou
- Vana Barba: Maro Dimou
- Alkis Panagiotidis: Marlafekas
- Dimitris Poulikakos: Giannis Papadopoulos
- Timos Perlegkas: minister
- Thanasis Papageorgiou: investigator
- George Kyritsis: prosecutor
- Yiannis Goumas: advisor to the minister
- Rocky Taylor: Cindy
- Anna Makraki: advisor minister
- Margarita Lambrinou: Mrs. Lambrou
- Gerassimos Skiadaressis: sound engineer
- Steve Ntouzos: technician
- Georges Ninios: cafe owner/police officer
- Kostas Apostolidis: lieutenant
- Christos Simardanis: prosecutor

== Computers ==
BIOS + Politia is the first Greek film in which a computer is used as a central element of the plot while it is also the central element of the film's poster.

The film's title is a play on words with the phrase "bios ki politia" and the IT term BIOS, i.e. "the Basic Input Output System, the soul of the computer, its basic system", as Karamanos explains to his superior.

The computer featured in the film is an Olivetti M24, an IBM PC compatible, with an Intel 8086 processor, 640 kB of memory, and an MS-DOS operating system. Unlike other IBM PC clones, the M24 was highly compatible and used the much more powerful Intel 8086 processor at 8 MHz instead of the Intel 8088 at 4.77 MHz used by the IBM PC XT, while also allowing the addition of the 8087 math coprocessor.

The computer program, which we see in numerous scenes throwing matchstick lines, was created specifically for the needs of the film by Olivetti Hellas, which allocated its technicians for a week exclusively to write the program.

Some of the quizzes that the computer sets in the film to avoid detonating the bomb also have to do with computers.

The film had a great impact on computer enthusiasts. The magazine MICROmad, one of the first technical magazines exclusively for computers in Greece, published two consecutive special features on it. The first special feature was in issue 16 (December 1987), which even had the film's poster as its cover, while the next issue featured an interview with Pavlos Kontogiannidis about the film and computers.

The ever-prescient Perakis, who was also involved in computers, first raised ethical issues regarding the collection of personal data in 1987. He has Karamanos mention the example of someone who asks for a doctor's phone number from a directory because he has a heart condition. "Someone can learn this information and exploit it. For example... "...to be fired from his job, or not to have insurance, or not to have the grocer give him a drink," says Karamanos. And when his boss characterizes his reasoning as excessive, Karamanos replies: "Excessive? Soon even the Evges (convenience stores) will have computers, faster than the State in fact."

== Personal experiences ==
According to the creator Nikos Perakis, BIOS + politia, as well as its previous sequel, Loafing and Camouflage, contain his personal experiences from his service in the army at the beginning of the Dictatorship. At dawn on April 21, while the commando company had occupied the OTE tower, Perakis accompanied four officers as an interpreter to Langenberg, Germany, where the then most powerful black-and-white transmitter in Europe was located, which the German state channel WDR and the Hellenic-German Chamber of Commerce had agreed to donate to the TED. These experiences are perhaps responsible for his “obsessions with OTE, transmitters and the media and explosions in general.” In practice, however, all he did, as he himself states on his website, was simply to feel a little satisfaction when a few weeks later the Germans refused to give them the transmitter.
