= Lakis Lazopoulos =

Greek playwright, actor and songwriter

- Λάκης Λαζόπουλος
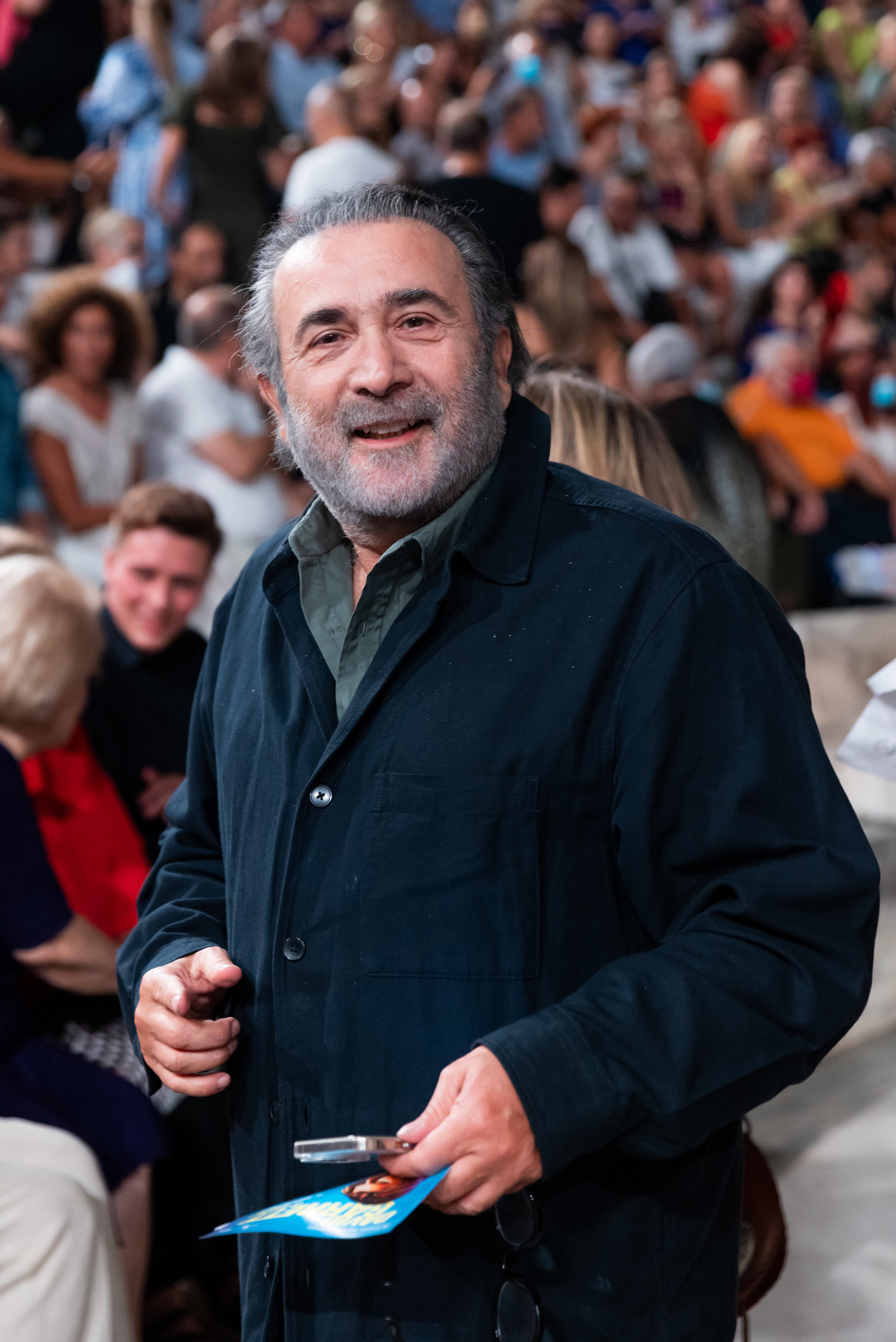
- Lakis Lazopoulos in August 2022
- Born: Apostolos Lazopoulos; Larissa, Greece
- Occupations: Actor, comedian, script writer, columnist, tv presenter, song writer, performer (song) and lawyer
- Years active: 1979–present
- Spouse: Tasoula Lazopoulou

Apostolos (Lakis) Lazopoulos (Greek: Απόστολος "Λάκης" Λαζόπουλος) is a Greek playwright, actor, comedian, script writer, producer, tv presenter, writer, columnist, songwriter and performer. He was ranked 83rd by the public in Skai TV's Great Greeks in 2009. In 2010, Forbes ranked Lazopoulos as the most powerful and influential celebrity in Greece.

== Early life ==
Lazopoulos was born in Larissa, Greece, where he received his primary and secondary school education. He then entered the School of Law at the University of Thrace and in 1984 received his Master's degree from the University of Thessaloniki. However, he decided not to practice law or pursue other vocations outside of art and entertainment.

== Early career ==
In 1979, he wrote his first script for the revue Something's cooking in Gipsyland. Say Goodbye, It's All Over Now, a quick success. Lazopoulos joined the Free Theatre of Athens, where he performed Why People are Happy, followed by yet another successful revue, Change and Craze.

The political situation at the time triggered the production of four revues of a more politico-satirical nature, written between the years 1982-86 by Lazopoulos and Giannis Xanthoulis: Haido’s Pasok (1982), Pasok Keeps Harping On (1983), Blowing Hot and Cold on Kastri (the PM's residence), and Andrea’s Taxing Tolls (1985).

== Career ==
=== 1986–1993 ===
In 1986 he starred in Lysistrata. The play toured Greece and was performed in all major theaters to success and acclaim. That same year, he began writing on his own and staged I was Pasok and I grew old.

In 1987, he wrote What the Japanese Saw, a satire of Greek politics and various public figures. He was sued over this by the then-President of Greece, Christos Sartzetakis. He stood trial but was acquitted of all charges. This drew press coverage both within and outside of Greece, including an article in Time Magazine.

In 1988 he staged and performed in Nicholai Gogol's "Diary of a madman" without great commercial success. In 1989 he staged "Greece after heart surgery" which broke records, while his following play "There was a Small Ship" ran for two successive years and was a box office hit. 1n 1991 Lazopoulos staged "I Have Something to Tell You", in which he wrote and performed as himself like all his previous plays. In the summer of the same year he toured Greece with the performance "Alone at Last". This comprised a series of his most popular acts, and proves to be his most successful commercially since 1981. Its success spurred another tour followed two years later, debuting in New York City.

In 1992 he turns his attention to television, writing and interpreting fifteen character roles (both male and female), in the most successful TV series on Greek television to date, Deka mikroi Mitsoi. Portraying everyday characters satirizing contemporary social and political situations, it drew affinity with the public. Spurred by the success of the series, the educational department of the University of Athens conducts a survey looking into reasons why Greeks avidly watched the series and expressions used by its characters. With Lazopoulos present, the findings were officially announced to academics, students and the press. Deka mikroi Mitsoi also took part in the festival of Forte dei Marmi in Italy, receiving an Honorable Distinction.

In 1993 he presented Prokofiev's well-known tale of Peter and the Wolf at the Athens Opera House. He also played the role of McKeith in Brecht's "Three Penny Opera" under the direction of Jules Dassin. In 1994 he played the male lead in a television film titled Girl with Suitcases directed by Nikos Nikolaidis. He followed this with a guest star appearance in the film "Kavafis", directed by Giannis Smaragdis. In the summer of 1996 he wrote the play "The Sunday of Shoes", which goes on to be staged in Thessaloniki in the spring of 1997 and then Athens at the beginning of 1998. During that year, Walt Disney Productions assigned him the supervisory role of the animation film Hercules, for which he provided his own adaptation from English to Greek. He oversaw the casting of actors and uses his own voice in dubbing the roles of Philoctetes/Phil and Panic in the film.

=== 1999–2008 ===
In the summer of 1999 he played the lead role in the film Beware of Greeks Bearing Guns directed by Australian director John Tatoulis. The film was a box office hit when released in Greece in January 2000. In 2001 he wrote, directed, and starred in the film My best friend. He concurrently wrote the theatrical play "Ta Leme", which maintained its position at the top of the box office well into 2002. In September 2002 he presented 12 theatrical monologues from the most important writers of 1700. That same summer he presented a theatrical monologue as part of the framework of the Cultural Olympiad entitled "Ages of Ridicule".

Between 2003 and 2004 he wrote, directed, and starred in the revue "Wind in our Sails", which was presented at the theatre Britannia in Athens to commercial success. At the same time, he became artistic director for two prominent Athens theaters, the Britannia and Athinon. In February 2004 the film R20, for which he wrote co-directed with P. Karazas, opened at the box office. During the summer of 2004 he held the leading role of Hremilos in Aristophanes' historical comedy Ploutos. The play toured Greece, culminating in a special performance at the ancient theatre of Epidaurus, as part of the Athens Olympics that August.

The winter of 2004 to 2005 found Lazopoulos writing, directing and starring as the lead in another successful and original production at Athens' Britannia theatre, "Where is this Bus Going?" The show was a success, receiving exceptional reviews from the press. The premiere of Al Tsantiri News ("Live from the Shack") in November 2004 made Lazopoulos the first actor in Greek television history to host his own weekly show. To the present day, this satirical news bulletin continues to draw high ratings.

Since 2004 he has held the position of Programming Director for the entertainment sector of the privately owned television channel, Alpha TV. The television program "504KM North of Athens", inspired by student life in Greece, was a project through which he was able to introduce a group of young actors and a talented new director to Greek audiences. The film "Don't Go", released in April 2005 was an adaptation of this story. In the summer of 2005 Lazopoulos was set to once again bring his own style and interpretation to another Aristophanes play, The Acharnians this time for The National Theatre of Greece. In November 2005, he directed and played the lead in Vretania Theater, "Hysteria" written by Tery Johnson. In 2006 he played Nicolo (Greco's best friend) in the film El Greco. The movie was released in October 2007 and set a record for ticket sales.

In November 2008 and after 3 years of absence from the theater he wrote, directed and starred as the lead in the play "Toiler on the roof". The play was a success.
