= Min archizeis ti mourmoura =

- Genre: Comedy
- Based on: Escenas de Matrimonio
- Written by: Greece: Elena Solomou; Konstantina Giachali; Viky Alexopoulou; Kostis Papadopoulos; Constantine Ganosis; Panagiotis Christopoulos; Fofi Kotti; Nikos Stathopoulos; Viky Koukoutsi; Foteini Atheridou; Themis Gkyrtis; Giannis Diakakis; Sara Ganoti; Cyprus: Christiana Artemiou; Antreas Christodoulou
- Directed by: Greece: Antonis Aggelopoulos; Dionysis Ferentinos; Cyprus: Stamos Tsamis; Thodoris Nikolaidis; Nastazia Christodoulou
- Starring: Greece: Antonis Antoniou; Eleni Kokkidou; Vladimiros Kyriakidis; Dafni Lamprogianni; Panos Vlachos; Ioanna Triantaphyllidou; Giannis Tsimitselis; Danai Epithymiadi; Foteini Atheridou; Konstantinos Plemmenos; Nantia Kontogeorgi; Giorgos Chrysostomou; Maria Chanou; Spyros Chatziaggelakis; Anna koutsaftiki Spyros Tsekouras; Klelia Renesi; Maria Katsandri; Erietta Manouri; Stathis Koikas; Parthena Chorozidou; Cyprus: Christiana Artemiou; Michalis Sofokleous; Mariella Savvidou; Alexandros Parisis
- Opening theme: I gynaika mou i mourmoura by Imam Baildi
- Country of origin: Greece; Cyprus
- Original language: Greek
- No. of seasons: 11
- No. of episodes: 792

Production
- Producer: Kostas Sousoulas (5-11)
- Production locations: Athens, Greece
- Running time: 32-46 minutes
- Production companies: Plus Productions (1-5); Green Pixel Productions (6-)

Original release
- Network: Alpha TV; Alpha TV Cyprus
- Release: October 7, 2013 – July 14, 2024

Min archizeis ti mourmoura (English: Don't start grumbling) is a Greek and Cypriot comedy television series produced from 2013 to 2024. It is based on the Spanish series Escenas de Matrimonio by Mediaset España & Alba Adriática.

In Greece it is broadcast by the television station Alpha TV. In Cyprus, from 2013 to 2016, the series was broadcast on the television station Sigma, while from 2016 the series was transferred to Alpha TV Cyprus, when the station began operating.

It is the longest-running Greek comedy television series.

== Plot ==
The plot of the series revolves around the daily lives of different couples of all ages from 20 to 65, who are not connected to each other. Each couple has their own space where they live, while the story of each couple in each episode is not connected to the stories of the other couples.

== Cast ==
- Antonis Antoniou as Minas Stratellis (1–11 season)
- Eleni Kokkidou as Voula Vlachaki Stratelli (1–10 season)
- Vladimiros Kyriakidis as Hlias Charamis (1–11 season)
- Dafni Lamprogianni as Marina Akrivopoulou Charami (1–5 season)
- Panos Vlachos as Charis Maragkos (1–3 season)
- Ioanna Triantaphyllidou as Vaso Stergiou (1–3 season)
- Giannis Tsimitselis as Nikitas Charitopoulos (3 season)
- Danai Epithymiadi as Stella Vasileiou (3 season)
- Foteini Atheridou as Lena Psarra (4 season)
- Konstantinos Plemmenos as Simos Varkaris (4 season)
- Nantia Kontogeorgi as Nikoleta Papastamou (4 season)
- Giorgos Chrysostomou as Dionysis Crysafis (4 season)
- Maria Chanou as Evaggelia-Eleni "Veli" Kadylioti (5–10 season)
- Spyros Chatziaggelakis as Aggelos Mpoikos (5–10 season)
- Anna koutsaftiki as Xenia Chatzioannou (5–11 season)
- Spyros Tsekouras as Mpampis Papadopoulos (5–11 season)
- Klelia Renesi as Kaiti "Kitso" Dimitroulopoulou (6–10 season)
- Maria Katsandri as Zouzou Aggelou (11 season)
- Erietta Manouri as Zoi Lioliou (11 season)
- Stathis Koikas as Fanis Exarchopoulos (11 season)
- Parthena Chorozidou as Toula Vicha (11 season)
- Christiana Artemiou as Christina Koufopavlou (5–6 season)
- Michalis Sofokleous as Fotis Fotiou (5–6 season)
- Mariella Savvidou as Dimitra Georgiou (6 season)
- Alexandros Parisis as Giannis Eleftheropoulos (6 season)
