= Elena Tsavalia =

Greek actress and presenter (born 1964)

Elena Tsavalia (born February 16, 1964, Athens) is a Greek actress, presenter and entrepreneur.

== Biography ==
=== Television ===
Along with her roles in the cinema, she also took her first steps on television. Specifically, in the 1988–1989 season, she made her television debut with a leading role in the social series of the state television Synomosia, playing together with Giorgos Tsitsopoulos, Tasos Chalkias and Giorgos Partsalakis. This was followed by her participation in two episodes of the ANT1 comedy series Police Thanasis Papathanasis, while in the period 1990-1991 she played in the comedy series of the same channel The Bachelors. She became more widely known to the general public with the role of Eleni Petridou in the comedy series by Yiannis Dalianidis The minors in the 1992–1993 season aired by Mega Channel.

In the 2014–2015 season, she presented together with her husband Markos Seferlis the morning entertainment show of the Mega Channel "MEGA with one". In 2019, she signed a cooperation contract with the television station Open TV for the presentation of the midday show Mesemeriatika. Due to poor cooperation with the show's production, she left after two weeks of working in just 8 episodes of the show.

She is going to star in the upcoming ANT1 series, Mamacita.

=== Entrepreneurship ===
In 2020, she and Andreas Lagos opened the shop "ERTHE", which sells drinks and healthy snacks.
