= Imam Baildi =

Greek musical band

Ιmam Baildi
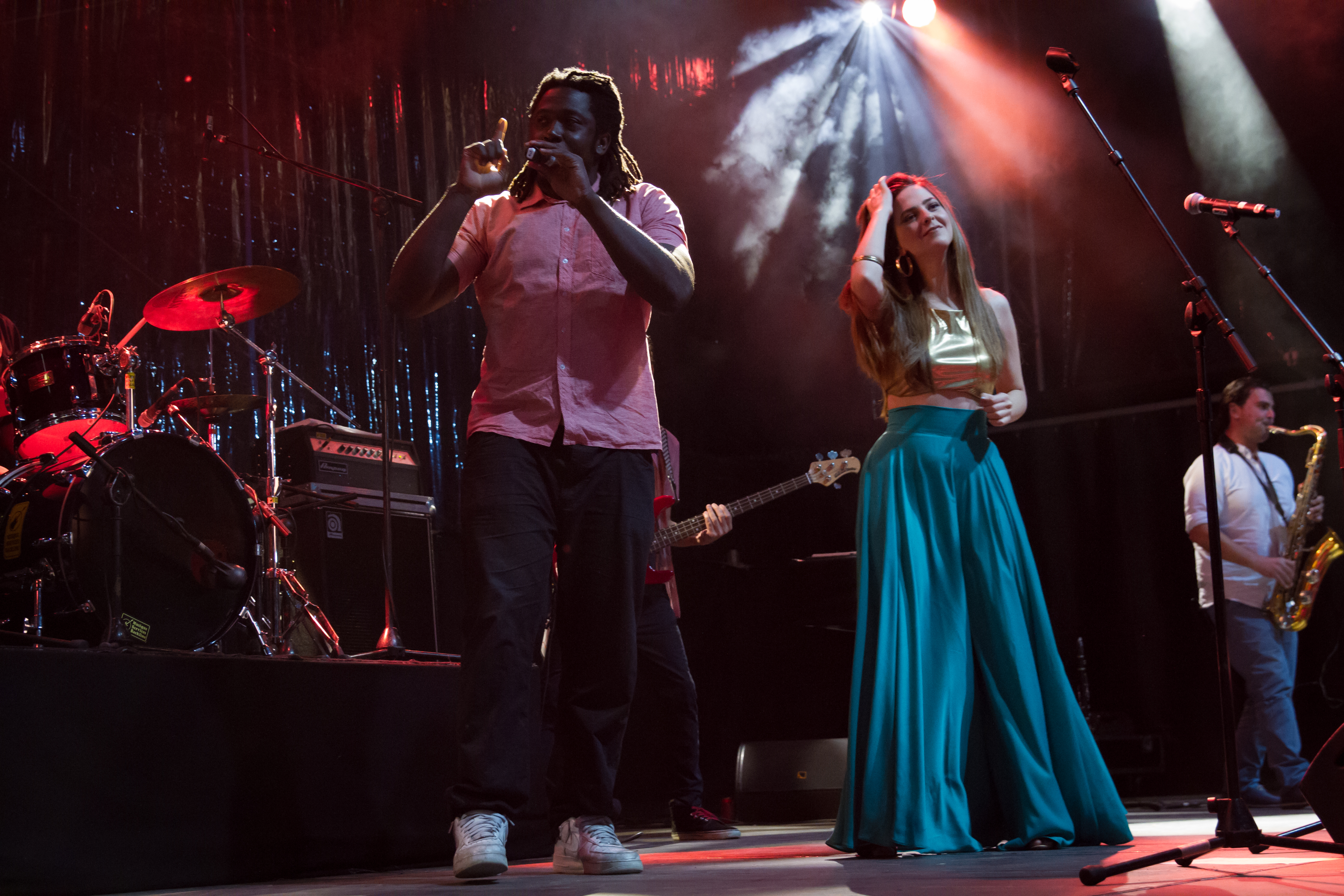

Background information
- Origin: Athens, Greece
- Genres: Electronic, Folk, World, & Country
- Years active: 2007 – Present
- Labels: Kukin Music / EMI (Greece and Cyprus); The END Records (USA & The Americas, UK, Asia)
- Members: Lysandros Falireas; Orestis Falireas; Alexis Arapatsakos; Giannis Diskos; Periklis Aliopis; Lambis Kountourogiannis; Stelios Provis; MC Yinka; Rena Morfi

Imam Baildi (Ιμάμ Μπαϊλντί) is a Greek band that was formed by brothers Orestis & Lysandros Falireas in 2007 when the two brothers started experimenting with remixes of Greek songs from the 1940s, 1950s and 1960s.

== Career & Band Background ==
The name of the group derives from the traditional Ottoman-Turkish dish imam bayıldı. Falireas brothers stem from a family with a long connection with rebetiko: their father owned both a record label specialising in the genre and a popular record shop in central Athens with a vast 78 rpm vinyl collection. The band represents the idea of mixing rebetiko with different types of music.

Their self-tiled debut was released in 2007 on EMI Greece to great critical acclaim, followed by more than 130 live shows in Greece around Europe that included support slots for Massive Attack, Ojos De Brujo and Gogol Bordello and performances at France's Transmusicales de Rennes and Denmark's Roskilde Festival.
Imam Baildi released their second collective effort in 2010 bearing the name ‘The Imam Baildi Cookbook’. Along with original compositions and mixes it features collaborations with LA hip-hoppers Delinquent Habits and Maxwell Wright of Ojos de Brujo fame, Barcelona's flamenco/world/hip-hop darlings.

They released their third album "Imam Baildi III" in 2014. It consists of Freestyle, Downtempo, Folk and Hip Hop styles.

== Discography ==
- 2007: Imam Baildi
- 2010: The Imam Baildi Cookbook
- 2014: Imam Baildi III
