= I Katara tis Tzelas Delafragka =

- Genre: Comedy
- Created by: Michalis Reppas; Thanasis Papathanasiou
- Based on: To klama vgike ap' ton paradeiso
- Written by: Michalis Reppas; Thanasis Papathanasiou
- Directed by: Michalis Reppas; Thanasis Papathanasiou
- Starring: Ioannis Apergis; Niki Lami; Kaiti Konstantinou; Michalis Reppas; Maria Lekaki; Tzois Eveidi; Anna Kouri; Mathildi Maggira; Chrysa Ropa
- Country of origin: Greece
- Original language: Greek
- No. of seasons: 1
- No. of episodes: 14

Production
- Executive producer: Lumad Productions
- Producer: Elena Chatzialexandrou
- Production locations: Athens, Greece
- Running time: 55-60 minutes

Original release
- Network: Alpha TV
- Release: September 24 – December 22, 2024

I Katara tis Tzelas Delafragka (English: The Curse of Tzela Delafragka) is a Greek television comedy series by Michalis Reppas and Thanasis Papathanasiou based on the film To klama vgike ap' ton paradeiso (2001), broadcast on Alpha TV. The series premiered on 24 September 2024[1] and concluded on 22 December 2024.

== Plot ==
Peloponnese, today. Between two villages, Ano and Kato Paparia, a love story of Romeo and Juliet unfolds... from there on, nothing will stand still! Unscrupulous businessmen, entanglements, family estrangement, professional killers, blackmail, kidnappings and every kind of possible and unlikely twist will happen in this series. May "Tzela D" and its chimneys be well, because the eleventh lawyer Stefanos Baras may have retired in Athens, but the curse of Tzela will remain for eternity.

== Cast ==
- Ioannis Apergis as Manolios Fortounakis/Teris Fortounakis
- Niki Lami as Marouso Vrontaki
- Kaiti Konstantinou as Alexis Vrontaki
- Michalis Reppas as Zakoulas Bochos
- Tzois Eveidi as Halima Bochou
- Chrysa Ropa as Myrsini Orthovyzi Fortounaki
- Alexandros Antonopoulos as Osman Vourdampeis
- Sofia Vogiatzaki as Adelfi Karamazov
- Vaso Goulielmaki as Gitsa Fortounaki-Vrontaki
- Tzeni Diagoupi as Adelfi Katsampa
- Manos Ioannou as Takos Roupas
- Kostas Kazakas as Stevos Roupas
- Elena Charalamboudi as Salomi Bohos
- Anna Kouri as Adelfi Tzavara
- Maria Lekaki as Janet Sevastou
- Antonis Loudaros as Varonos Sevastos
- Mathildi Maggira as Gavriela Partolou
- Antigoni Naka as Tapini Chamouraki
- Spyros Poulis as Sotos Poulos
- Mariella Savvidou as Hadice Vourdampei
- Mairi Sausopoulou as Chaido Vrontaki
- Panos Stathakopoulos as Ntanos Karavidoglou
- Dimitra Stogianni as Tania Pipiza
- Charis Chiotis as Michalios Vrontakis
- Gianna Zianni as Sana Roupa
- Antonis Kalomirakis as Lampros Sevastos
- Iliana Kalymnak as Farah Roupa
- Panagiotis Karmatis as Mpempakos Bochos
- Ioanna Kolonelou as Lora Sevastou
- Spyros Kyriakos as Sifis
- Penelopi Malousi as Flora Sevastou
- Thanos Birkos as Panagos Sevastos
- Iris Pantazara as Adelfi Katsimicha
- Marialena Rozaki as Ayse Vourdampei
