= Deka mikroi Mitsoi =

- Genre: Satirical Comedy
- Created by: Lakis Lazopoulos
- Directed by: Grigoris Petriniotis; Athina Aidini
- Starring: Lakis Lazopoulos; Eleni Gerasimidou; Christos Chatzipanagiotis; Maria Georgiadou; Pavlos Chaikalis; Sofia Filippidou; Tasos Palantzidis; Vasilis Charalampopoulos
- Country of origin: Greece
- Original language: Greek
- No. of seasons: 6
- No. of episodes: 49

Production
- Production locations: Athens, Greece
- Running time: 45-120 minutes

Original release
- Network: Mega Channel (1992-2003); ANT1 (2018)
- Release: March 31, 1992 March 5, 2003 – March 31, 2018 June 2, 2018

Deka mikroi Mitsoi (English: Ten little Mitsoi) is a Greek satirical comedy series that aired on Mega Channel from 1992 to 2003, and returned after 15 years on ANT1 with 5 new episodes. The series was created and starred by writer and comedian Lakis Lazopoulos, directed by Grigoris Petriniotis and Athina Aidini.

Through a total of 20 main characters, played by Lazopoulos himself, this series attempted to satirize and comment on the ills of society at that time. The success of the series is due to the variety of roles, as well as the caustic humor of the creator.

== Characters ==
Below is a brief description of the most important "Mitsos". They are given in order of appearance.

- Mitsos and Ririka (1992-1994)
- Mitsos and Elenitsa (1992-2018)
- Mitsos and old woman (1993-2018)
- Dimitris and Tzeni (1992-1993)
- Gyftos (1992-2018)
- Mitsos Fevgouleas (1992-2018)
- Chira Mitsi (1992-2018)
- Fylakismenos (1992-2001)
- Anthropakos (1992-2018) - One of the few characters who has changed little since the beginning of the series.
- Mitsi Karamitsi (1993-2018)
- Tzimis (1993-2018), "Floros", the rich kid from Ekali,
- Jim's (1993-2018)
- Konstantinos Karamanlis (1992-1998)
- Moutsos (1992-2018)
- Michelle and Emmanuela Grumboulaki (1994-2018)
- Dimis (2001-2018)
- Mitsos the Salonikios (2001-2018)
