= I Ntanta =

- Genre: Comedy
- Created by: Alexis Kallitsis; Manow Psistakis; Vaggelis Natsis; Iphigenia Kotsoni; Giorgos Hliopoulos; Maro Panagiotakopoulou; Panagiotis Kapodistrias
- Based on: The Nanny
- Directed by: Kostas Kimoulis; Mirna Tsapa
- Starring: Maria Lekaki; Kostas Apostolidis; Christos Simardanis; Kalliroi Myriagkou; Iphigenia Vogiatzaki; Vasilis Karagiannis; Natalia Dara
- Country of origin: Greece
- Original language: Greek
- No. of seasons: 2
- No. of episodes: 70

Production
- Executive producer: Tiletypos A.E.
- Producers: Mega Channel; Sony Columbia
- Production locations: Athens, Greece
- Running time: 25-30 minutes

Original release
- Network: Mega Channel
- Release: September 23, 2003 – June 28, 2005

I Ntanta (English: The Nanny) is a Greek comedy television series that is an adaptation of the American television series The Nanny and was broadcast on Mega Channel television receivers in the 2003-2005 seasons.

== Series overview ==
| Season | Episodes | Originally aired | |
| Season | Episodes | First aired | Last aired |
|---|---|---|---|
| 1 | 34 | September 23, 2003 | June 15, 2004 |
| 2 | 36 | September 28, 2004 | June 28, 2005 |

== Plot ==
Mary Papadaki, a woman in her 30s from a working-class background, is fired from the bridal shop where she worked after her boyfriend and store owner, Alexis, dumps her, and so she starts working as a cosmetics saleswoman. At the beginning of her new career, she accidentally knocks on the door of a wealthy house belonging to the well-known theatrical entrepreneur, Aris Bakopoulos, who is desperately looking for a nanny for his three children, who have recently lost their mother and have already rejected many nannies.

Having no other options, he hires Mary, who integrates in the best way with Aris' children, Natalia, Phoibos and Evita. Little by little, and while Mary has won the hearts of the three children, she develops a special relationship with Aris. In the end, they end up married and live together as a family.

== Cast ==
- Maria Lekaki as Mary Papadaki
- Kostas Apostolidis as Aris Bakopoulos
- Christos Simardanis as Dionysis Chatzimichail
- Kalliroi Myriagkou as Smaragda Plapouta
- Iphigenia Vogiatzaki as Natalia Bakopoulou
- Vasilis Karagiannis as Phoibos Bakopoulos
- Natalia Dara as Evita Bakopoulou
- Thaleia Papazoglou as Poletta Papadaki
- Maria Katsoulidi as Gogo Dimoragka
- Despoina Stylianopoulou as Giagia Ritsa
