= Maria Solomou =

Greek actress

- Born: Maria Solomou; 1 October 1974 (age 51); Athens, Greece
- Children: 1

Maria Solomou (Greek: Μαρία Σολωμού, born 1 October 1974) is a Greek actress in television, theatre and cinema. She studied economics at the American College of Greece and acting at the drama school "Iasmos – Vasilis Diamantopoulos".

== Personal life ==
From 2004 to 2008, Solomou had been in a relationship with Greek actor Marios Athanasiou. They have a son named Alexandros-Dimitris Athanasiou (b. 2005).
From 2010 to 2019, Solomou had been in a relationship with Greek singer Panos Mouzourakis. She appeared in the video clip of his song "Fila me akoma".
