= To kokkino domatio =

- Genre: Comedy
- Written by: Alexandros Rigas; Dimitris Apostolou
- Directed by: Alexandros Rigas
- Starring: Vasiliki Andritsou; Alexandros Rigas; Christos Tripodis; Marcelo Lekomt
- Opening theme: Putting On The Ritz by Terry Snyder
- Ending theme: Putting On The Ritz by Terry Snyder
- Country of origin: Greece
- Original language: Greek
- No. of seasons: 3
- No. of episodes: 82

Production
- Executive producers: Ninos Elmatzioglou; Thodoris Kontos
- Production locations: Studio Paiania, Athens, Greece
- Running time: 42-45 minutes
- Production company: TV Epsilon

Original release
- Network: Mega Channel
- Release: October 6, 2005 – June 13, 2008

To kokkino domatio (English: The red room) is a Greek comedy television series of standalone episodes that aired on Mega Channel during the 2005-2008 seasons. The series presents the adventures of the heroes who stay in the best suite of the Conte Del Mare hotel, the Red Room. The main characters of the series are Maro (housemaid), Miltos (receptionist) and Antonis (bartender).

== Series overview ==
| Season | Episodes | Originally aired | |
| Season | Episodes | First aired | Last aired |
|---|---|---|---|
| 1 | 32 | October 6, 2005 | June 15, 2006 |
| 2 | 22 | October 6, 2006 | May 18, 2007 |
| 3 | 28 | October 5, 2007 | June 13, 2008 |

== Cast ==
Main cast

- Vasiliki Andritsou as Maro Andreou
- Alexandros Rigas as Miltos Giatzoglou
- Christos Tripodis as Antonis
- Marcelo Lekomt as Marcelo Andreou

Supporting cast

- Sofia Pavlidou as Sofia
- Thanasis Alevras as Pastun
- Kaiti Finou as Kaiti
- Foteini Mpaxevani as Chrysa
- Fotis Spyros as Tasos
- Manos Psistakis as Nasos
- Theodosis Kotsis as Takis
- Alexandros Saripanidis as Giorgos
- Athina Metallinou as Mairi
- Mara Mparola as Veta
- Panagiotis Kapodistrias as Giannis
- Parthena Chorozidou as Evgenia
- Paris Petrou as Michalis
- Hlias Alexandrou as Hlias

Notable guests

- Dimitris Piatas
- Dimitra Matsouka
- Aias Manthopoulos
- Katerina Tsavalou
- Theodora Siarkou
- Eleni Gerasimidou
- Takis Zacharatos
- Thanasis Kourlampas
- Petros Filipidis
- Konstantina Michail
- Gogo Mastrokosta
- Thodoris Atheridis
- Maria Kavogianni
- Mirka Papakonstantinou
- Eleni Rantou
- Jessy Papoutsi
- Giannis Aivazis
- Kaiti Konstantinou
- Giannis Zouganelis
- Christos Chatzipanagiotis
- Rika Dialyna
- Souli Sabach
- Evelina Papoulia
- Sofia Moutidou
- Giannis Mpostantzoglou
- Pemy Zouni
- Katerina Lechou
- Fotis Sergoulopoulos
- Apostolos Gkletsos
- Panagiota Vlanti
- Giorgos Giannopoulos
- Antonis Loudaros
- Elli Kokkinou
- Kostas Sommer
- Pavlos Kontogiannidis
- Anna Panagiotopoulou
- Maria Lekaki
- Viky Stavropoulou
- Crysoula Diavati
- Kostas Koklas
- Maria Georgiadou
- Tasos Kostis
- Maria Solomou
- Kostas Apostolidis
- Antonis Kafetzopoulos
- Christos Simardanis
- Christina Theodorpoulou
- Katia Dandoulaki
- Vera Krouska
- Sofia Vogiatzaki
- Giorgos Chraniotis
- Nefeli Orfanou
- Eleni Kastani
- Paschalis Tsarouchas
- Maria Filippou
- Kostas Voutsas
- Sotiris Moustakas
- Renia Louizidou
- Michalis Mitrousis
- Giorgos Seitaridis
- Christos Valavanidis
- Christina Guulielmino
- Giorgos Konstantinou
- Aimilia Ypsilanti
- Melpo Zarokosta
- Athinodoros Prousalis
- Antonis Antoniou
- Giorgos Charalampidis
- Tasos Iordanidis
- Fai Kokkinopoulou
- Mina Adamaki
- Krateros Katsoulis
- Yvonni Maltezou
- Natalia Tsaliki
- Alexandros Antonopoulos
- Sofia Filippidou
- Iro Mane
- Christos Nomikos
- Vilma Tsakiri
- Danis Katranidis
- Dafni Labrogianni
- Arietta Moutousi
- Sofia Vossou
- Elisavet Moutafi
- Tania Trypi
- Sperantza Vrana
- Elnta Panopoulou
- Maria Tzompanaki
- Thanos Kalioras
- Giorgos Kapoutzidis
- Loukia Papadaki
- Elisavet Konstantinidou
- Kostas Spyropoulos
- Kostas Evripiotis
- Joyce Eveidi
