= Epta thanasimes petheres =

- Genre: Comedy
- Written by: Katia Kissonergi; Panagiotis Kapodistrias; Vasilis Risvas; Dimitra Sakali; Konstantina Giachali; Argyro Margariti; Thodoris Gkougkleris; Mairi Moygiakakou; Pantelis Kanarakis; Roza Riga; Tzo Fragkou; Nikoletta Marketou; Eleni Letherioti; Konstantinos Katselis; Christos Ntouzas; Katerina Frappa; Maro Mpourdoukou; Konstantinos Rodis; Melina Tsampani; Thomas Tsampanis; Petros Kalkovalis; Zacharias Mavroeidis; Alexandros Rigas; Manos Psistakis; Dimitris Apostolou
- Directed by: Grigoris Petriniotis; Rena Michailidou
- Starring: Viky Stavropoulou
- Theme music composer: Stamatis Kraounakis
- Opening theme: Epta thanasimes petheres by Polina & Stamatis Kraounakis
- Country of origin: Greece
- Original language: Greek
- No. of seasons: 7
- No. of episodes: 173 (+3 making of)

Production
- Production locations: Athens, Greece
- Running time: 110–120 minutes
- Production company: Sonar TV

Original release
- Network: Mega Channel
- Release: January 20, 2004 – June 1, 2010

Epta thanasimes petheres (English: Seven deadly mothers-in-law) is a Greek comedy television series of standalone episodes that aired on Mega Channel during the 2004–2010 seasons.

== Plot ==
Viky Stavropoulou plays a good angel who takes part in the stories of the series in order to help with any problems caused by the mothers-in-law. Until the middle of the sixth season, in 2009, viewers do not know anything about the identity of the narrator. In January 2009, the story of the deadly mother-in-law is broadcast, in which viewers learn the whole story of the narrator. Kalliopi, who when she was alive was tormented by her mother-in-law, and when she died God assigned her the mission of helping the daughters-in-law from dangerous mothers-in-law - and being invisible to ordinary mortals - watches, narrates and intervenes in favor of good.

== Cast ==
1st season

- Eleni Gerasimidou as Maria Kalafaki - The widowed mother-in-law
- Martha Vourtsi as Persa Aivalioti - The unpredictable mother-in-law
- Mirka Papakonstantinou as Kaiti Terzidi - The doctor-stricken mother-in-law
- Chrysoula Diavati as Foteini Lampropoulou - The stingy mother-in-law
- Maria Kavogianni as Nota Ntaton - The logical mother-in-law
- Karmen Rouggeri as - The punishing mother-in-law

2nd season

- Eleni Kastani as Vasiliki Lorandou - The racist mother-in-law
- Ntina Konsta as Kiki Skevaki - The ceremonial mother-in-law
- Despoina Mpempedeli as Marianna Meletopoulou - The good mother-in-law
- Renia Louizidou as Maria Adamopoulou - The modern mother-in-law
- Pinelopi Pitsouli as Tasia Stamatidi - The cunning mother-in-law
- Betty Valasi as Marika Gramenidi - The politician mother-in-law
- Katiana Mpalanika as Smaro Lampropoulou - The pharmacologist mother-in-law
- Anna Panagiotopoulou as Maria Ioannidou - The monkey mother-in-law
- Tzesy Papouptsi as Evdoxia Stathatou - The popular mother-in-law
- Martha Karagianni as Dionysia Mporanta - The nouveau riche mother-in-law

3rd season

- Dimitra Papadopoulou as Aspasia Ioannou - The deaf mother-in-law
- Kaiti Konstantinou & Elisavet Konstantinidou as Antigoni Liakouri & Stasa Tzeveleka - The mothers-in-law
- Eleni Gerasimidou as Melpo Karagianni - The fantasy-stricken mother-in-law
- Yvonni Maltezou as Vasiliki Lampeli - The victim mother-in-law
- Nena Menti as Flora Greka - The scheming mother-in-law
- Natalia Tsaliki as Lia Papadopoulou - The feminist mother-in-law
- Mimi Ntenisi as Theoni Fliarou - The mafia mother-in-law
- Anna Kyriakou as Zoi Mpereta - The evil mother-in-law
- Tasos Chalkias as Thanos Mylonas - The male mother-in-law
- Katerina Gioulaki as Veta Vasiliadou - The mechanic tailoring mother-in-law

4th season

- Eleni Kastani as Rena Fragkiadoulaki - The Cretan mother-in-law
- Nena Menti as Nektaria Koukoula - The Thessaloniki mother-in-law
- Pinelopi Pitsouli as Mpilio Mouzmoula - The shepherdess mother-in-law
- Elisavet Konstantinidou as Erasmia Mpalamouti - The gypsy mother-in-law
- Kaiti Konstantinou as Nitsa Pavlaki - The Smyrna mother-in-law
- Iro Mane as Pota Panoutsopoulou - The Mani mother-in-law
- Maria Kavogianni as Agiolina Gypa - The Corfu mother-in-law
- Natalia Tsaliki as Erietta Dalgirani - The Kalamatian mother-in-law
- Vera Krouska as Veronika Spathopoulou - The Kolonaki mother-in-law
- Joyce Eveidi as Andrianna Asimakopoulou - The Patrinian mother-in-law

5th season

- Mirka Papakonstantinou as Erietta Kapatou - The Kefalonian mother-in-law
- Kaiti Garmpi as Kaiti Marini - The Athenian mother-in-law
- Maria Kavogianni as Stefania Drakou - The Syrian mother-in-law
- Chrysa Ropa as Vasiliki Stergianou - The Thracian mother-in-law
- Nena Menti as Chariklia Tsaganou - The western suburbs mother-in-law
- Eleni Anousaki as Evangelia Terzaki - The Nafplio mother-in-law
- Pinelopi Pitsouli as Kiki Tsatsou - The Spartan mother-in-law
- Elisavet Konstantinidou as Paresa Askeridou - The Pontian mother-in-law
- Iro Mane as Thomesa Gkika - The Arvanitian mother-in-law

6th season

- Chrysoula Diavati as Zampia Ragousi - The Parian Mother-in-Law
- Katia Dandoulaki as Elpida Dandoulaki - The Lerian Mother-in-Law
- Kaiti Konstantinou as Mary Darzenta - The Piraeus Mother-in-Law
- Joyce Eveidi as Gianna Daskalaki - The Mother-in-Law from the Other World
- Betty Livanou as Amalia Mavromichali - The Deadly Mother-in-Law
- Chrysa Ropa as Tzeni Traiforou - A Mother-in-Law in the Junta
- Elisavet Konstantinidou as Magda Kolyva - The New Democracy Mother-in-Law
- Maria Aliferi as Christina Alamanou - The Hippie Mother-in-Law
- Anna Maria Papacharalampous as Kalista Arianidi - The Mother-in-Law from the Future

7th season

- Maria Kavogianni as Agaristi Alkmeonidi - The ancient mother-in-law
- Mirka Papakonstantinou as Marina Delipetrou - The mother-in-law of the economic crisis
- Alexandra Palaiologou as Antigoni Emenoglou - The mother-in-law lifting
- Maria Lekaki as Manto Anagnostara - The mother-in-law of 1821
- Betty Valasi, Maria Kavogianni, Pinelopi Pitsouli, Elisavet Konstantinidou, Kaiti Konstantinou, Yvonni Maltezou & Natalia Tsaliki as Marika Gramenidi, Agiolina Gypa, Tasia Stamatidi, Erasmia Mpalamouti, Mary Darzenta, Vasiliki Lampeli & Lia Papadopoulou - Group Therapy: The politician mother-in-law, The Corfu mother-in-law, The cunning mother-in-law, The Gypsy mother-in-law, The Piraeus Mother-in-Law, The victim mother-in-law & The feminist mother-in-law
