= Latremenoi Mou Geitones =

- Genre: Comedy
- Created by: Manuel Ríos San Martín; Nacho Cabana; César Vidal Gil; Chus Vallejo; Pablo Barrera
- Based on: Mis adorables vecinos
- Written by: Panos Amarantidis; Elena Solomou; Kostas Vazakas; Konstantinos Ganosis
- Directed by: Pierros Andrakakos
- Starring: Kostas Koklas; Ava Galanopoulou; Giorgos Konstantis; Arietta Moutousi; Christos Simardanis; Rania Schiza
- Theme music composer: Dimitris Kontopoulos
- Opening theme: Ela sto rythmo mazi mou by Tamta
- Country of origin: Greece
- Original language: Greek
- No. of seasons: 2
- No. of episodes: 53

Production
- Production locations: Athens, Greece
- Running time: 45-55 minutes
- Production company: Studio ATA

Original release
- Network: Mega Channel
- Release: October 11, 2007 – June 18, 2009

Latremenoi mou geitones (English: My beloved neighbors) is a Greek comedy series written by Panos Amarantidis and Konstantinos Ganosis, directed by Pierros Andrakakos and broadcast on Mega Channel. The series is based on a Spanish production, Mis Adorables Vecinos.

== Plot ==
The series revolves around the lives of two families. The Moustoxides family is from a poor neighborhood and working class, however their young daughter, Betty, wins a reality singing show (much like Pop Idol) and ends up a superstar with the family becoming very rich. They move in next door to the Papapavlos family who are sophisticated Athenians.

== Cast ==
- Kostas Koklas as Mpampis Moustaxidis
- Ava Galanopoulou as Pelagia Moustaxidi
- Giorgos Konstantis as Vyron Papapavlou (season 1)
- Arietta Moutousi as Miranda Papapavlou (season 1)
- Rania Schiza as Olivia Galinou (season 2)
- Christos Simardanis as Ilias Galinos (season 2)
- Alexandta Ousta as Ifigeneia Galinou (season 2)
- Theocharis Ioannidis as Aris Moustaxidis (season 2)
- Sofia Vogiatzaki as Petroula
- Michalis Iatropoulos as Aggelos
- Marita Gagani as Lydia Galinou (season 2)
- Iro Loupi as Froso
- Dimitris Vlachos as Aris Moustaxidis (season 1)
- Smaragda Kalimoukou as Lisa Papapavlou (season 1)
- Nefeli Kanaki as Mpety Moustaxidi
- Dimitris Daoulis as Michalakis Moustaxidis
- Efi Papatheodorou as Zammpeta
- Eleni Tzortzi as Ioulia Gatou
- Anna Dimitrijevic as Milica
- Vasiliki Kara as Nefeli Papapavlou (season 1)
- Kostantinos Lagos as Konstantinos Papapavlou (season 1)

== Focus ==
Although there are occasional glimpses of the underlying tensions involved with class and behaviour, upbringing and status, the series generally focuses on the obvious for its humour, for example the way in which Pelagia dresses and behaves betrays her origins and often the upper-class locals look down on her ways.

== Ratings ==
The first season averaged a 35% rating and the second, with a lot of changes (writer, cast etc.), 22%.
