= List of programs broadcast by ANT1 =

This article lists programs broadcast by ANT1 and on ANT1 Cyprus for international viewers from Greece and Cyprus:

== Scripted programming ==
=== Soap operas ===
Title	Premiere date	Finale	Seasons	Episodes	Notes
Family / Family Casino	January 23, 1990	March 7, 1992	3	124	The title changed on season 3 from Family to Family Casino
In the shadow of money	March 13, 1991	1992	2	85	
The Shine	September 16, 1991	July 29, 2005	14	3,457	The most long-running Greek TV series
The Blue Diamond	September 14, 1992	October 15, 1993	2	350	
The Silent Agreement	September 14, 1992	October 30, 1992	1	26	The series was cancelled suddenly after a month
Goodmorning Life	November 26, 1993	March 31, 2006	13	3,093	The second most long-running Greek TV series
Love	September 18, 2005	May 30, 2008	3	646	
Lola	September 22, 2008	July 7, 2009	1	202	
Karma	October 7, 2009	October 15, 2010	1	151	
There are moments	January 23, 2012	June 1, 2012	1	91	
A waltz with 12 gods	October 8, 2012	July 17, 2014	2	262	
Brousko	September 29, 2013	July 10, 2017	4	772	
The Classmates	October 28, 2014	July 28, 2017	3	433	
Roua Mat	September 15, 2014	December 23, 2015	2	317	
Twin Moons	December 24, 2015	July 7, 2017	2	322	
Without you	September 14, 2015	July 29, 2016	1	137	
The 5 keys	September 12, 2016	June 29, 2017	1	185	
Zoe the Virgin	September 25, 2017	June 29, 2018	1	187	
Unknown Woman	September 17, 2018	July 10, 2020	2	348	
The Way Back	September 17, 2018	June 28, 2019	2	162	
Anger	September 17, 2018	April 18, 2019	1	62	
If I were rich	September 16, 2019	May 29, 2020	1	137	
Wild Bees	September 29, 2019	July 7, 2022	3	421	
The Sun	September 20, 2020	April 19, 2022	2	319	

=== Comedy ===
Title	Premiere date	Finale	Seasons	Episodes	Notes
Stories without tears	January 1, 1990	1991	2	77	
Angel by accident	October 2, 1990	1991	1	46	
The chief advocate	October 3, 1990	1991	1	18	
Policeman Thanasis Papathanasis	October 6, 1990	1992	2	69	
Mama Mia	January 18, 1991	August 2, 1991	1	28	
The bachelors	February 6, 1991	1991	1	26	
The gunner and the diva	March 5, 1991	1991	1	29	
The gossip women	May 8, 1991	August 14, 1991	1	15	
The blue cruise	July 3, 1991	August 16, 1991	1	14	
A Very Merry Widow	September 16, 1991	January 21, 1992	1	15	
Family Mousama	September 17, 1991	1992	1	40	
The male cat game	September 18, 1991	1992	1	21	
Signature Priftis	September 19, 1991	1992	1	42	
The two orphan	September 20, 1991	1992	1	25	
Yes sir!	September 21, 1991	1992	1	26	
The female judge	September 21, 1991	1992	1	26	
Daddy and best friend	December 2, 1991	1992	1	26	
I am the Prime Minister	March 4, 1992	1992	1	20	
We aren't well!	March 10, 1992	1992	1	13	
At the psychiatrist's	September 14, 1992	1993	1	18	
Bil, Jason and Docy	September 15, 1992	1993	1	41	
Les Misérables by female Victor Hugo	September 15, 1992	September 22, 1992	1	2	cancelled suddenly after 2 episodes
Citizen Babis	September 16, 1992	December 9, 1992	1	13	spin-off of Signature Priftis
In the land of crazy people	September 16, 1992	1992	1	13	
The Bakouria	September 17, 1992	January 28, 1993	1	19	
Roommates in madness	September 18, 1992	1993	1	41	
The girlfriends	November 19, 1992	1993	1	30	
You will talk with my lawyer	December 1, 1992	1993	1	31	
Plakas Melathron	December 4, 1992	1993	1	32	
The widower, the widow and the worst	February 4, 1993	1994	2	50	
The Modern-Greeks	April 5, 1993	1993	1	12	
In the constellation of the tie	September 13, 1993	1994	1	23	
Brutalities	September 14, 1993	1994	1	28	
The soldiers of Greece	September 15, 1993	1995	2	54	
Those and the others	September 16, 1993	May 7, 1996	3	110	
The Good Mother-in-Law	September 17, 1993	1995	2	81	
Th wrong way around	November 1, 1993	1994	1	34	
To each his own madness	March 9, 1994	June 8, 1994	1	13	
The rested and light	September 14, 1994	1995	1	18	
The ridiculous of the thing	September 15, 1994	1995	1	23	
Taurus with Sagittarius	September 16, 1994	1995	1	32	
The Holy Quartet	February 1, 1995	1995	1	13	
Our Father	February 3, 1995	1996	1	54	
Shampoo	October 2, 1995	1996	1	14	
Elli and Anna	October 4, 1995	1996	1	33	
Skate life	October 6, 1995	1996	1	28	
Jackpot	October 6, 1995	1996	1	26	
Separated with children	February 2, 1996	1996	1	11	
Happy Untangling	March 4, 1996	1996	1	14	
The Right Sophia	March 19, 1996	1997	2	51	
Goodnight Mum	September 30, 1996	1997	1	35	
A very bad end	October 1, 1996	December 10, 1996	1	11	
Women and I	October 2, 1996	1998	2	58	
Cheek to Cheek	October 18, 1996	1997	1	32	
Carambola	September 29, 1997	1998	1	37	
Next Door	September 30, 1997	1998	1	31	
Borrowed Dad	October 3, 1997	1998	1	30	
And the married have soul	October 7, 1997	June 22, 2000	3	106	
Konstantino's and Eleni's	October 5, 1998	June 29, 2000	2	69	ANT1 never stopped rerunning the show since 1999 in its daytime program
Crimes	October 6, 1998	June 27, 2000	2	66	
Nanny for everything	October 8, 1998	1999	1	34	
Miss Margarita	October 9, 1998	1999	1	32	
Bam, dad and daughter	March 17, 1999	June 23, 1999	1	12	
Sister souls	October 4, 1999	2000	1	34	
Tango for three	1999	June 29, 2000	1	35	
Sex Revolution	October 3, 2000	2000	1	Unknown	The series was cancelled suddenly after a month
Strive for engagement	October 3, 2000	2001	1	26	
Up and Down	October 3, 2000	1	35		
One plus One	October 5, 2000	2001	1	27	
It's never too late	October 5, 2000	2001	1	31	
Not a good secretary	October 6, 2000	2001	1	36	
Lifting	February 1, 2001	February 15, 2002	2	38	
Very family friendly	October 1, 2001	January 27, 2003	2	48	
For a woman and a car	October 3, 2001	June 18, 2002	1	33	
What's up with Charis?	October 3, 2001	2002	1	12	The series was cancelled suddenly
Orange Vodka	October 4, 2001	June 20, 2002	1	33	
The siren and the cop	October 4, 2001	2002	1	21	
Karambelas' Family	2001	2002	1	13	
Educating Babis	September 26, 2002	2003	1	11	
Friends	October 1, 2002	2004	2	63	
My sweetest lie	October 21, 2002	2004	2	57	
The stables of Erieta Zaimi	October 28, 2002	February 17, 2004	2	36	
White House	2003	2003	1	17	
Greece, Your Majesty	September 22, 2003	2005	2	65	
Like the dog and the cat	2003	2004	1	21	
Joy's Café	September 26, 2003	May 6, 2021	5	131	
Solo Career	September 28, 2004	2005	1	21	
The knives	September 30, 2004	2005	1	26	
You should have been careful	2004	2005	1	19	
Que sera sera	September 22, 2005	2006	1	17	
You will find your teacher	September 28, 2005	June 27, 2007	2	80	
A marriage with everything	September 30, 2005	2006	1	17	
I love you forever	2005	2005	1	11	
Show me your friend	2005	2005	1	20	The series was cancelled suddenly and the rest of the episodes were aired in 2012-2013
You never know	2005	2006	1	13	
30 days of agony	January 17, 2006	2006	1	9	
Let's love each other	January 20, 2006	2006	1	18	
Di$ Madiam	October 3, 2006	May 14, 2007	1	24	
How sweet you kill me	October 3, 2006	2007	1	16	
Fortune Mountain	October 4, 2006	2007	1	31	
Take it otherwise	October 4, 2006	2006	1	6	The series was cancelled suddenly
Mirror mirror	October 5, 2006	2007	1	15	
The Barbarians	October 6, 2006	2007	1	12	
Sketches	October 6, 2006	2007	1	30	
Are you kidding me!	March 1, 2007	2007	1	17	
Kiss your frog	October 1, 2007	June 22, 2009	2	58	
Daddy's Girls	October 3, 2007	2008	1	26	
Super Daddy	October 4, 2007	January 29, 2008	1	13	The series was cancelled suddenly
The cicada and the ant	October 5, 2007	2008	1	18	The series was cancelled suddenly
Coupling	November 15, 2007	February 16, 2008	1	10	The series was cancelled suddenly
Paris and Eleni	October 6, 2008	December 22, 2008	1	10	The series was cancelled suddenly
Litsa.com	October 7, 2008	December 23, 2009	2	37	
40 waves	October 8, 2009	June 17, 2009	1	28	
7 Lives	October 9, 2008	2008	1	11	The series was cancelled suddenly
Working Woman	February 5, 2009	March 8, 2010	2	20	
My Family Inside	February 5, 2009	2009	1	13	
Doctor Roulis	October 14, 2009	December 23, 2009	1	9	The series was cancelled suddenly
Mr. and Mrs. Pels	January 6, 2010	April 14, 2010	1	13	
Dream Catcher	January 6, 2010	February 16, 2011	2	34	
Star Wars	February 19, 2010	February 25, 2011	2	20	
Single and handsome	January 13, 2012	May 17, 2012	1	14	
The sin of my mother	March 28, 2012	December 14, 2012	2	13	The series was cancelled suddenly
Good jobs	March 18, 2014	May 20, 2014	1	9	
Tamam	October 13, 2014	May 12, 2017	3	66	
Hair	October 14, 2014	May 5, 2015	1	22	
Daddy Cool	April 7, 2016	July 12, 2017	2	46	
Goodbye my sweet co-mother-in-law	November 21, 2016	March 3, 2017	1	12	
Some divorced lads	October 2, 2017	June 19, 2018	1	80	
4x4	October 4, 2017	March 11, 2018	1	24	
Throw the fryer away	September 24, 2018	June 23, 2020	2	114	
Make parents look good	September 26, 2018	December 18, 2018	1	15	
Don't worry	January 16, 2019	June 27, 2020	2	87	
Present Yourself!	September 28, 2020	June 1, 2021	1	60	
Familia	September 30, 2020	June 3, 2021	1	56	
Out of service	September 19, 2022	November 15, 2023	1	18	The series was cancelled suddenly
Papadopoulos Who?	September 21, 2022	June 12, 2023	1	60	

=== Drama ===
Title	Premiere date	Finale	Seasons	Episodes	Notes
The Yellow File	October 1, 1990	1991	1	39	
The trust	October 4, 1990	1991	1	26	
Fear and Passion	October 5, 1990	1991	1	40	
The File Amazon	September 19, 1991	February 6, 1992	1	20	
The Sacrifice	November 8, 1991	March 13, 1992	1	18	
East wind	February 13, 1992	1992	1	43	
A woman from the past	February 27, 1992	1992	1	16	
Moral Department	September 15, 1992	June 6, 1995	3	112	
Anatomy of a crime	September 17, 1992	February 10, 1995	3	72	
Red-Dyed Hair	September 18, 1992	1993	1	37	
The box number 13	October 19, 1992	1993	1	20	
Love Story	September 13, 1993	1994	1	30	
Stiletto heel	September 17, 1993	1994	1	23	
The Execution	October 18, 1993	1994	1	20	
Silver dinar	March 9, 1994	1994	1	14	
The path of love	March 18, 1994	July 13, 1994	1	18	
Daring Love Stories	September 12, 1994	1995	1	26	
Strass	September 12, 1994	1995	1	18	
The Ignored	September 13, 1994	December 3, 1994	1	12	
Fatal passion	March 10, 1995	1995	1	18	
The third wreath	October 2, 1995	1996	1	16	
One life for Elsa	October 3, 1995	1996	1	20	
The streets of the city	October 5, 1995	1996	1	28	spin-off of Moral Department
Fitting of the wedding dress	October 6, 1995	1	25		
The color of the moon	September 30, 1996	1997	1	30	
Painted Sun	October 2, 1996	1997	1	18	
To Death	January 21, 1997	1997	1	17	
Dilemmas	January 31, 1997	1997	1	18	
One night like this	March 5, 1997	1997	1	13	
Falling Angel	September 29, 1997	March 18, 1998	1	21	
The price of passion	October 3, 1997	1998	1	20	
Infidelities	March 13, 1998	1998	1	18	
A touch of soul	October 5, 1998	June 14, 1999	1	31	
Desires	October 8, 1998	June 15, 2000	2	65	
Storm	October 9, 1998	1999	1	32	
The borders of love	October 4, 1999	June 12, 2000	1	33	
Sweet and sour wine	October 8, 1999	2000	1	16	
Thief Love	October 2, 2000	2001	1	32	
Innocent or guilty	October 3, 2000	2001	1	34	
Trojan Horse	October 5, 2000	2001	1	20	
Dark Ocean	October 6, 2000	March 9, 2001	1	20	
Aliki	2000	2001	1	20	
As long as there is love	October 4, 2001	2002	1	22	
Challenge	October 5, 2001	2002	1	20	
Kiss of Life	October 1, 2002	2004	2	64	
The Countdown	2002	2003	1	20	
Couples	2002	2003	1	30	
Love Came From Afar	October 4, 2002	June 20, 2003	1	30	
The Sorry Game	October 3, 2003	2004	1	31	
Happy Times	September 27, 2004	2005	1	24	
Don't say goodbye	October 1, 2004	June 24, 2005	1	32	
Sweet like a jam	2005	2005	1	17	
Purple-Pink	September 26, 2005	2006	1	20	
Hidden paths	September 30, 2005	2006	1	31	
In the sun of Aegean	2005	2006	1	30	
Love's piercing	January 16, 2006	June 27, 2007	2	62	
Ioanna of heart	October 5, 2006	2007	1	20	
For Anna	October 6, 2006	2007	1	30	
Above the law	March 12, 2007	May 21, 2007	1	9	The series was cancelled suddenly
Deligiannis Girls' School	October 1, 2007	June 6, 2008	1	28	
Stolen Life	October 1, 2007	2008	1	22	
Stories from the opposite bank	October 3, 2007	December 14, 2007	1	10	The series was cancelled suddenly
Lighthouse	October 4, 2007	2008	1	16	The series was cancelled suddenly
Jugerman	October 5, 2007	2008	1	15	The series was cancelled suddenly
The Charmer	2007	2008	1	15	
Medical confidentiality	June 13, 2008	2009	1	20	
The key of heaven	October 8, 2008	June 26, 2009	1	26	
Steps	February 23, 2011	December 24, 2011	1	20	
Without limits	March 4, 2011	May 31, 2011	1	20	
The Excursion	October 15, 2014	March 23, 2015	1	16	
Trapped	September 19, 2022	today	2		
After the fire	October 5, 2023	December 21, 2023	1	24	

=== Scripted reality series ===
Title	Premiere date	Finale	Seasons	Episodes	Notes
On the trail of the killer	1994	1994	1	Unknown	
Mystery Stories	March 12, 2007	June 18, 2007	1	11	
Crime and passion	September 24, 2018	December 14, 2018	1	12	
The clinic	July 11, 2022	December 21, 2022	1	40	

=== Satirical/Comedy shows ===
Title	Premiere date	Finale	Seasons	Episodes	Notes
AMAN the bastards	1997	2007	10	Unknown	
The Seferlee Show	2000	2001	1		
Super Mammy	April 3, 2022	June 25, 2022	1	12	

=== Television movies ===
Title	Premiere date	Notes
The night of the witches	December 24, 1990	Christmas comedy; the only TV movie with Aliki Vougiouklaki
Love without presence	January 27, 1993	Drama written bu Alexandros Kakavas
Passion	February 10, 1993	Thriller
Tattoo	February 24, 1993	Drama directed by Dimitris Arvanitis
Guilty relationships	March 10, 1993	Thriller written by Anna Adrianou
The spot	April 7, 1993	Drama written by Giorgos Stampboulopoulos
Everything in its time	July 1, 1993	Comedy
The girl with the suitcases	March 23, 1994	Comedy with Lakis Lazopoulos
No makeup	May 11, 1994	Drama
Forever Together	December 24, 1999	Christmas comedy written by Haris Romas and Anna Chatzisofia
Heaven for three	2003	Comedy
Forever Together	2005	Drama written by Dimitris Arvanitis
Foreign between us	2005	Drama directed by Manousos Manousakis
I love your mum	May 22, 2007	Comedy written by Haris Romas

Length of new episodes from the earliest to the latest are written in brackets.

- Ciao ANT1 - variety show, first hosted by Roula Koromila, then by Giorgos Marinos
- Giannis o omorfos (John the Pretty Boy) (2007) - sketch comedy
- I Mama Teras (1999–2000) - action
- Me Agapi Anna (1993–1994) - variety show, hosted by Anna Vissi
- No U Yes - Is Over Serie; Christos Manolis, Kostas Kalamaris, Loutanox Lagadopoulos
- O Nanos (2001–2003) - comedy
- Oi 3 Fyles (2004) - sketch comedy; KITRINOS DRAKOS-2005 ANT1
- Prosoxi Markopedio (1999–200) - comedy, hosted by Markos Seferlis
- The Seferlis Show (2000–2001) - comedy, hosted by Markos Seferlis
- Xaibania 3-0 (2000) - sketch comedy; Kitrinos Drakos-2005 ANT1
- Xtypokardia Sto Seferli Hills (Heartbeat at Seferly Hills) (2001–2002) - comedy show, hosted by Markos Seferlis
- Yaina & Drakos - teen comedy in ATTIKI

== Entertainment ==
- Allaxate Geuseis - cooking show with Alexandros Papandreou
- Analyse To - informative program that helps individuals with their personal problems, from phobias, to stress and depression to insecurities; psychologist Sandy Koutsostamati discusses issues that many people in society face and gives practical advice on dealing with these problems
- Αuti Ine I Zoi Sou (This is Your Life) - discussion/biographical program examining the lives of famous people
- Axizi Na To Deis (Worth Watching) (September 2006 - June 2010) - showbiz news and discussions about various issues with guests; hosted by Tatiana Stefanidou
- Big Brother
- Dancing with the Stars (2010–2012,2018-) - Greek version of the American reality show
- Deal (2006–2011) - gameshow, Greek version of international sensation Deal or No Deal, hosted by Christos Ferentinos
- Don't Tell the Bride (2011) - Greek version of the English reality show
- Ehis Gramma - an emotion-filled show where people are brought together for various purposes: to re-unite with loved ones, to thank someone for their help, to apologize to someone for some previous act committed against them and many others; hosted by Alexandra Kapeletsi; airs Tuesdays at 9pm; previously aired on Alpha TV
- Fame Story - reality TV show; hosts have been Natalia Germanou, Andreas Mikroutsikos, Tatiana Stefanidou and Sophia Aliberti
- Game of Chefs (2021) - Greek version of the American reality show
- H Lista - gameshow, hosted by Christos Ferentinos
- Kalomeleta Kai Erhete (2006–2009) - weekend variety show, informative and entertaining; reporters travel all around Greece, meeting the people, learning about the area and its history; hosted by Sofia Aliberti and Mihalis Marinos
- Music Bee (2006) - music show with Stathis Kavoukis and Julia Alexandratou
- Next Top Model (2009–2011) - model show, hosted by Vicky Kagia
- Νyxta Tha Fugoume - satire, a humorous look at the world around us and the issues facing us all
- O diadoxos tou Uri Geller - magic show, hosted by Cristos Feredinos; special guest Uri Geller
- O Kalyteros Kerdizi (1994–95) - gameshow, hosted first by Miltos Makridis, then by Giolanda Diamanti
- O Trohos tis Tyhis - gameshow, Greek version of Wheel of Fortune; first hosted by Terrence Quick, then by Giorgos Polychroniou, then by others
- Oi Spitogati - variety show, with music, talk, games and more; hosted by Niki Kartsona and Makis Pounentis
- Ola 7even - satire, comedy, with Themos Anastasiadis
- Pantevou Sta Fanera - gameshow; contestant select 'their match' by posing various questions and with the help of two friends; the person they select will then accompany them on an unforgettable vacation; similar to The Dating Game
- Pass Pantou - magazine-style show that informs and entertains viewers with news on celebrities, style tips, behind the scenes at the hottest parties, surprises, fascinating travels and much more; hosted by George Satsidis airs Sundays at 5pm
- The Real Housewives of Athens (2011) - Greek version of the American reality show
- Poios thelei na ginei ekatommyriouchos- Greek version of "Who wants to be a millionaire"-hosted by Grigoris Arnaoutoglou-airs daily at 8pm
- Superdeal - gameshow, similar to Deal; aired Sundays at 9pm and prize amounts awarded were greater, up to 500.000 euros; the most expensive gameshow in Greece so far; hosted by Christos Ferentinos
- Top Chef (2010–2011) - Greek version of the American reality show
- The X Factor (2008–2011) - Greek version of the popular UK reality program
- Your Face Sounds Familiar (2013–2014) - Greek version of the reality show
- Πάvω ή κάтω - gameshow, Greek version of Card Sharks, hosted by Alkis Tallow

== Game shows ==
Title	Host(s)	Premiere date	Finale	Seasons	Notes
TV-roulette	Terens Quick	31 December 1989	31 December 1989	1	The very first program ever broadcast by ANT1 on its first day on air
Wheel of Fortune	Giorgos Polychroniou (1990–92), Pavlos Haikalis (1992–94), Danis Katranidis (1994–95)	January 1, 1990	July 28, 1995	6	Greek adaptation of Wheel of Fortune
Up or Down	Alkis Steas	January 2, 1990	1990	1	Greek adaptation of Card Sharks
Stop at spots	Bety Livanou	1990	1990	1	
Chasing the big adventure	Argyris Pavlidis & Hristina Avlianou	1991	1991	1	
The price doesn't have a price	Elias Benetos	1991	1992	1	Greek adaptation of The Price Is Right
Super Bingo	Nico Mastorakis	1991	April 3, 1993	2	
Yes or no	Michalis Tsaousopoulos	1992	1993	1	
Candid Camera	Marina Tsintikidou & Thodoris Koutsogiannopoulos (1992), Thodoris Koutsogiannopoulos & Vicky Koulianou (1992–93)	November 5, 1992	May 12, 1993	1	Greek adaptation of Candid Camera
Hidden Camera	Popi Chatzidimitriou & Thodoris Koutsogiannopoulos	May 19, 1993	July 28, 1993	1	A spin-off of Candid Camera
The Marriage Game	Jovana Fragkouli	1993	1993	1	
Do what I do	Sakis Boulas	1993	1994	1	A new version of the Greek game show Do what I do
Super Market	Makis Pounentis (1993–94), Michalis Tsaousopoulos (1994–95)	1993	1995	2	Greek adaptation of Supermarket Sweep
Well done, you lost!	Polina	1994	1995	1	
The best one wins	Miltos Makridis (1994–96), Yolanda Diamanti (1996–97)	1994	1997	3	
Golden Tripoints	Apostolos Gkletsos	1995	1996	1	
Taxi	Markos Seferlis	1995	1996	1	
Big Fun	Haris Romas	1995	1996	1	
Do it or not	Andreas Mikroutsikos	1996	1998	2	
The buddies	Christos Ferentinos	1997	1998	1	
Ten with a ton	Giorgos Papadakis	1997	1999	2	
Joker	Giorgos Polychroniou & Yolanda Diamanti (1997–98), Yolanda Diamanti (1999)	1997	1999	2	
It's your time now	Andreas Mikroutsikos	1998	1999	1	
The children play	Isavela Vlasiadou	1998	1999	1	
Men Ready for Anything	Andreas Mikroutsikos	1998	2000	2	
With Power	Vlassis Bonatsos & Annita Pania	1999	1999	1	Cancelled after 9 episodes
Bam!	Christos Ferentinos	2000	2002	2	Prank game show
In the dark	Angelos Pyriochos	2001	2002	1	
Thisavrofilakio	Andreas Mikroutsikos	2001	2004	3	Greek adaptation of The Vault
Your luckiest day	Andreas Konstantinou	2002	2003	1	
At the limits	Kostas Apostolidis	2002	2003	1	
Women in action	Chrysa Kakiori, Katerina Kokkineli, Eleni Mangina, Anna Orfanoudaki, Rania Stai	2004	2004	1	
Deal	Christos Ferentinos	February 12, 2005	March 4, 2011	5	Greek adaptation of Deal or No Deal
Not a blind date	Sofia Moutidou	2005	2006	1	A spin-off of The Dating Game
Super Deal	Christos Ferentinos	2006	2008	2	A spin-off of Deal or No Deal
The last passenger	Themis Georgantas	2007	2007	1	
Go straight	Konstantinos Angelidis	2007	2007	1	
Clever	Matthildi Maggira	2007	2008	1	
Are you more clever than a 10-year-old child	Sophia Aliberti	January 20, 2008	2009	2	Greek adaptation of Are You Smarter than a 5th Grader?
Show me the money	Christos Ferentinos	March 13, 2008	2008	1	
The list	Christos Ferentinos	2008	2009	1	
The Moment of Truth	Eugenia Manolidou	2008	2009	1	Greek adaptation of The Moment of Truth
Wipe Out	Eleni Karpontini (2010), Giorgos Lianos (2011-2012), Christoforos Zaralykos & Dimitris Menounos (2010-2013)	February 6, 2010	2013	5	Greek adaptation of Wipeout
Are you kidding me	Savvas Poumbouras & Dimitris Vlachos	March 9, 2011	January 20, 2014	2	Prank game show
Black Out	Nadia Boule	October 31, 2011	May 28, 2012	1	
Hold on tight	Giorgos Lianos	October 21, 2013	January 21, 2014	1	
The Biggest Game Show in the World	Nadia Boule	October 25, 2013	February 20, 2014	1	
Wanted	Giorgos Manikas, Stelios Chantabakis, Kostas Sideratos, Giorgos Vasilopoulos	February 3, 2014	December 30, 2014	1	
My mum cooks better than yours	Grigoris Arnaoutoglou	May 18, 2015	December 21, 2016	3	Greek adaptation of My mum cooks better than yours
Lucky Room	Giorgos Liagkas	November 13, 2016	2017	1	
Still Standing	Maria Mpekatorou	September 18, 2017	June 11, 2021	4	Greek adaptation of La'uf al HaMillion
Celebrity Game Night	Thodoris Atheridis	February 24, 2018	July 27, 2018	1	Greek adaptation of Hollywood Game Night
The mate knows	Tony Sfinos	July 9, 2018	December 9, 2018	1	
The Wall	Grigoris Arnaoutoglou	May 10, 2018	July 29, 2018	1	Greek adaptation of The Wall
Beat Buzzer	Giorgos Mavridis	September 25, 2018	December 30, 2018	1	
Best Friend's Fear	Savvas Poumpouras	January 10, 2020	May 29, 2020	1	
Taxi	Alexandros Tsouvelas	September 19, 2020	June 27, 2021	1	
5X5	Markos Seferlis (2021-2023), Thanos Kiousis (2023-2026)	April 5, 2021	February 20, 2026	6	Greek adaptation of Family Feud
Family Game	Markos Seferlis & Elena Tsavalia	October 22, 2022	April 9, 2023	1	

== News and information ==
- 6 me 10 Mazi - morning show for the weekend; features news, sports, current affairs and more; hosted by George Karameros and Spiros Haritatos
- 2004-4, 2004-3, 2004-2, and 2004-1 - Olympic preview shows
- Apodeixeis (2006-) - current affairs program that discusses issues of importance with the help of invited guests; hosted by Nikos Evangelatos
- Apokalipseis - brings to light the issues of everyday life affecting the public; hosted by Nikos Maneseis
- Ellada - informative show that airs exclusively on Antenna Satellite and Antenna Pacific'; geared towards the Omogenia, Greeks living abroad and features stories of interest to them; airs infrequently
- Ep' Autoforo - current affairs program that discusses issues of importance with the help of invited guests and a panel of experts
- Kalimera Ellada (Good Morning Greece) (since 1992) - morning programming, hosted by Giorgos Papadakis
- Kalimera Me Ton ANT1 - a quick look at all the local, national and international news headlines, weather forecasts and live reports and discussion on all the top stories; hosted by George Karameros
- Kokkino Pani (2001 - 200?) - news program, hosted by Pavlos Tsimas, Tasos Telloglou, Yorgos Kouvaras
- Me Ta Matia Tis Ellis (2004–2006) - current affairs show that featured a panel of guests and dealt with issues affecting people in their everyday life; hosted by Elli Stai
- Proinos Kafes - daytime entertainment show that has been on the air for nearly a decade; originally hosted by Eleni Menegaki until 2005; Eleonora Meleti then took over as host until 2008; then hosted by Nikos Moutsinas and Katerina Zarifi from 2008 to 2009
- Radio Arvyla - talk show with a satirical look on current events, based in Thessaloniki and hosted by Αντώνης Κανάκης, Γιάννης Σερβετάς, Στάθης Παναγιωτόπουλος and Χρήστος Κιούσης
- Studio Me Thea - morning show for the weekend; featured news, sports, current affairs and more; aired for seven seasons and was originally hosted by Nikos Manesis, then Spiros Haritatos and Evi Fragaki
- Ta Nea tou ANT1 (since 1989) - news, reported by Nikos Evagelatos
- Ta Nea tou ANT1 Cyprus - news, shown on ANT1 Cyprus, Satellite, and Pacific
- Ta Nea tou ANT1 Satellite (1994–1999) - news, mainly shown on ANT1 Satellite (English version), reported by Krista Fleischner; total length was about 15 minutes
- Proino ANT1 (ANT1's breakfast) - morning programming, hosted by Yiorgos Papadakis

== Sports ==
- UEFA Euro 2020
- 2022 FIFA World Cup
- Greek Basket League 1996-1998 and 2008-2009
- UEFA Europa League 2009-2015

== Foreign ==
- 24
- Alias
- Ally McBeal
- Bones
- Big Bad Beetleborgs
- Criminal Minds
- Day Break
- Desperate Housewives
- Dharma & Greg
- Dirt
- Greek
- Grey's Anatomy
- Kyle XY
- Las Vegas
- Lost
- Love, Inc.
- Merlin
- Miss Match
- Mighty Morphin Power Rangers
- Prison Break
- Private Practice
- Roswell
- Sailor Moon
- Fat Dog Mendoza
- Wacky World of Tex Avery
- The X-Files
- Anne
- Mia zoi (One Life)
- The Slayers
- VR Troopers
- The Magic School Bus
- Taotao

Other

- Dragon Ball
- Dragon Ball Z - dubbed in Greek; notable for translation mistakes and constant voice changes over characters; aired on Saturday and Sunday early in the morning. Episodes with Greek dub are rare but DeAgostini Hellas has released episodes on DVD called Dragonball Z - H Syllogh (Dragonball Z - The Collection) with Greek dub, and it is now very popular among fans.
- The Simpsons - aired in 2001-02 only; moved to Fox
- The Young and the Restless - aired from 1991 until 1999, and in 2000 moved to ET1
- The Cut
- Pink
- Signs of Life
- Girl Number 9
- Family Dog

== See also ==
- List of Greek films
