= To Proino =

- Also known as: Proino ANT1
- Genre: Talk show
- Directed by: Costas Tripilas
- Presented by: Giorgos Liagkas; Fay Skorda
- Country of origin: Greece
- Original language: Greek
- No. of seasons: 14

Production
- Production locations: Athens, Greece
- Running time: 135-150 minutes

Original release
- Network: ANT1
- Release: 14 October 2013 – present

Related
- Proinos Kafes; Proino ANT1

To Proino (English: The Morning; Greek: Το Πρωϊνό) (or simply Proino) is a Greek syndicated morning talk show hosted by Giorgos Liagkas. Currently in its 14th season, the show has aired on ANT1 as part of the network's daytime programming block since October 14, 2013, is broadcast live every weekday from 09:50 am to 13:00 pm. The programme features a variety of news, as well as news, tabloids, showbiz, lifestyle, home and garden, food, tech, astrology, competitions and live interviews.

The show was originally presented by husband and wife duo Giorgos Liagkas and Fay Skorda for the first three seasons of the show, after other three years of hosting the same type of show named Proino Mou (My Morning) on Mega Channel. In July 2016 Liagkas decided to quit the show, as they decided of breaking up as a couple in real life. From October 3, 2016, Fay Skorda started hosting the sole as a sole hostess. On January 25, 2021, Giorgos Liagkas entered the show again making an ex-husband and wife duo, as they used to do for six years on ANT1 and Mega Channel. On July 8, 2022, Fay Skorda quit the show, after nine years, completing her contract with ANT1.

== History ==
=== 2013-2016 ===
On August 1, 2013 ANT1 television network announced that they signed a big contract with the famous husband and wife hosting duo Giorgos Liagkas and Fay Skorda who since then they were hosting the high rated morning television talk show Proino Mou (My Morning)on Mega Channel for 3 whole years from 2010 to 2013. After the announcement of the contract it announced that they are going to continue in the same format at the same slot on morning entertainment morning television.

The first episode aired on October 14, 2013. On their new team the co-hostess and journalist Sasa Stamati followed them, from the previous, to their new show on ANT1. The three new panelists and co-hosts were the singer Girgos Lianos, the host and radio producer Themis Georgantas and the host and dancer Laura Narjes. The presenting of the cooking culumn was taken over by the Greek chef Argiro Barbarigou, who was the hostess of the cooking column of the morning slot of ANT1 since 2009 to the previous morning shows of the network. The astrology hostess was Litsa Patera, who started presenting the column since January 1, 1990 the first day the television network started working, on all the shows were preceded.

On season 2, 2014–2015, Lianos and Narjes quit the show with the host Mary Synatsaki, the journalist Aris Kavatzikis and the singer Kostas Doxas entering the show as co-hosts of Liagkas and Skorda. On season 3, 2015–2016, the hostess Maria Iliaki replaced Synatsaki after the second took over a show on the afternoon slot of the network.

On June 24, 2016, Giorgos Liagkas appeared on the show for the last time as one of the two hosts. Their break-up in real life with Fay Skorda, who had to be announced in November of the same year, made him to quit the show.

=== 2016-2021 ===
On October 3, 2016, Fay Skorda welcomed the audience on the fourth season of the show as a sole hostess. On the fourth season next to Skorda the co-hostesses were Themis Georgantas and Sasa Stamati, from the previous seasons, with the journalists Stefanos Konstantinidis, Kostas Tsouros, Jenny Melita and the model Mado Gasteratou entering the show. On July 14, 2017, on the last episode of the season, Sasa Stamati and the chef Argiro Barbarigou announced that they quit the show after 4 years.

On season 5, 2017–2018, the chef Vasilis Kallidis took over the cooking column and Kleopatra Patlaki with Aris Kavatzikis entered the show as panelists. This season was the last for the home column with Spyros Soulis after years. On seasons 6 and 7, the panelists next to Skorda were the host Dimitris Ougarezos and the journalists Aris Kavatzikis and Afroditi Grammeli with the cooking column host remaining the same. On season 8, 2020–2021, Skorda continued the show with Ougarezos adding the singer Koni Metaxa and the actor Dimitris Mothonaios and Petros Syrigos became the new cooking host. The start of this season of the show was characterized unsuccessful with really low ratings.

In early 2021 Fay Skorda and ANT1 decided to change the show radically to become again more competitive to the audience.

=== 2021-2022 ===
On January 11, 2021 ANT1 announced that Giorgos Liagkas is going to enter the show again after 4,5 years as the second host. On January 25 Skorda and Liagkas became again a television hosting duo. Their panelist team changed with only Dimitris Ougarezos remaining the show and the journalists Tasos Tergiakis and Nancy Paradeisanou entering the show. On season 9, 2021–2022, Ougarezos and Paradeisanou quit the show and journalist Fotini Petrogianni and the reality personality George Asimakopoulos entered the panel of the show. On July 8, 2022, on the last day of the season, Fay Skorda announced that she leaves the show after 9 years signing for a similar show with the television network Skai TV.

=== 2022-2023 ===
On September 5, 2022, Liagkas welcomed the audience on the tenth season as the host of the show. The model and hostess Doukissa Nomikou took over to be her new main co-hostess of To Proino. After three weeks Nomikou quit the show because of backstage problems with the team. On this season the show focused mainly on social current affairs news, tabloids and scaldals and less on the entertainment news and showbiz. Furthermore, Aria Kalyva enter the panel of the show. Moreover Argiro Barbarigou entered the show again as the cooking hostess after 6 years out of it. In November the actress Maria Korinthiou took over as the main co-hostess of Liagkas, who left the show before the end of the season.

=== 2023-2024 ===
On September 11, 2023, Liagkas welcomed Eleni Voulgaraki to the show's team, while Alexandros Papandreou took over the cooking, after Argiro Barbarigou's departure. The last days of that season, Litsa Patera stopped to appear to the show, while she wasn't at the season finale. This raised questions for what happened. Some days later, was announced that Litsa Patera leaves the show, after 11 years. That meant that she leaves the morning shows of ANT1, after 33 years.

=== 2024-2025 ===
On September 16, 2024, Afroditi Grammeli entered the panel of the show again after 4 years. At the end of the season, Liagkas announced that Afroditi Grammeli, Aria Kalyva, Eleni Voulgaraki and Vaggelis Perris leave the show, each one for different reason.

=== 2025-2026 ===
Before the begging of the season, in the summer, was announced that Sasa Stamati will enter the panel again, after 8 years, but she left 3 days after the announcement of her participation to the show. Finally, she was replaced by Despina Kampouri. From September 15, 2025, the show starts at 09:00 am and ends at 12:30 pm. At the beginning of the season, Liagkas welcomed 4 new members, Giota Kipourou, Panos Katsaridis, Despina Kampouri and Poseidonas Giannopoulos. Moreover, Stavros Mpalaskas participates in the show. Poseidonas Giannopoulos left the show four days after the premiere. At the end of the season, Liagkas announced that Giota Kipourou, Panos Katsaridis and Despina Kampouri leave the show after one season.

=== 2026-2027 ===
From September 21, 2026, the show starts again at 09:50 am and ends at 13:00 pm. At the beginning of the season, Liagkas welcomed 2 new members, Dimitris Ougarezos, who entered the panel again, after 5 years and Nora Kaouri. Giota Kipourou, finally didn't left the show, as had been announced at the end of the previous season.

== Hosts ==
=== Timeline ===
Host	Seasons													
Host	1	2	3	4	5	6	7	8	9	10	11	12	13	14
Fay Skorda														
Giorgos Liagkas														

== Special hosts ==
=== Panelists ===
Name	Duration
Themis Georgantas	2013-2018
Sasa Stamati	2013-2017
Giorgos Lianos	2013-2014
Laura Narjes	2013-2014
Kostas Doxas	2014
Mary Synatsaki	2014-2015
Aris Kavatzikis	2014–2016, 2017-2020
Maria Iliaki	2015-2016
Kostas Tsouros	2016-2018
Stefanos Konstantinidis	2016-2017
Mado Gasteratou	2016-2017
Nikos Partsolis	2016-2022
Kleopatra Partali	2017-2018
Dimitris Ougarezos	2018-2021, 2026–present
Afroditi Grammeli	2018-2020, 2024–2025
Nancy Paradeisanou	2019-2021
Konnie Metaxa	2020-2021
Dimitris Mothonaios	2020-2021
George Asimakopoulos	2021
Tasos Tergiakis	2021–present
Fotini Petrogianni	2021–present
Doukissa Nomikou	2022
Aria Kalyva	2022–2025
Maria Korinthiou	2022–2023
Eleni Voulgaraki	2023–2025
Giota Kipourou	2025–present
Despina Kampouri	2025–2026
Panos Katsaridis	2025–2026
Nora Kaouri	2026–present

=== Astrology ===
Name	Duration
Litsa Patera	2013–2024

=== Cooking ===
Name	Duration
Argyro Barbarigou	2013–2017, 2022–2023
Vasilis Kallidis	2017-2020
Petros Syrigos	2020-2022
Alexandros Papandreou	2023–present

=== Home and Design ===
Name	Duration
Spyros Soulis	2013-2018

== Running slot ==
Time	Duration
10:00 am – 12:50 pm	October 14, 2013 - March 9, 2017
10:00 am – 13:00 pm	March 10, 2017 - 9 July, 2021
09:50 am – 13:00 pm	September 6, 2021 – July 4, 2025
09:00 am – 12:30 pm	September 15, 2025 – July 3, 2026
09:50 am – 13:00 pm	September 21, 2026 – present

== See also ==
- List of programs broadcast by ANT1
