= Sissy Christidou =

Greek television presenter

- Σίσσυ Χρηστίδου
- Born: Theodosia Christidou; September 12, 1980 (age 45); Thessaloniki, Central Macedonia, Greece
- Occupations: TV Hostess; Journalist; Television Personality; YouTuber; Fashion Designer; Actress
- Years active: 2001–present
- Height: 1.75 m (5 ft 9 in)
- Spouse: Thodoris Marantinis (m. 2009; div. 2019)
- Children: 2

Theodosia (Sissy) Christidou (Greek: Σίσσυ Θεοδωσία Χρηστίδου; born September 12, 1980) is a Greek TV presenter, journalist, actress, YouTuber and ex-fashion designer. After she finished studying acting at the G.Theodosiadis Drama School of Athens, she made her television debut as a TV hostess of the TV 100 daytime talk show C Throu in 2001. She has also studied journalism and mass media.

She gained fame as a co-host on different popular Greek morning television shows such as, Beautiful World in the Morning (2005-2008), In a really good mood (2008-2011) and Breakfast ANT1 (2011-2012). In 2013, she entered the fashion industry with her own fashion brand sissychristidou.com. In 2017, she made her own YouTube channel sharing different parts of her life. In 2018, she came back on TV hosting her own weekend morning television talk show, Come one, Smile! with Sissy Christidou. From 2021, she hosts the weekend morning television talk show Smile Again with Sissy Christidou on MEGA.

== Early life ==
Theodosia Christidou was born on 12 September 1980, in Thessaloniki, Thodoris Christidis, a bank employee, and Mina Christidou, a housewife. She has a younger brother, named Giannis.

She graduated from the Music High School of Thessaloniki in 1998. Τhen, she studied acting at the G. Theodosiadis Drama School of Athens, from which she graduated in 2001. She also studied journalism, at the Ergastiri Epagelmatikis Demosiographias, in Athens.

== Career ==
=== Television debut, moving in Athens and new studies in journalism (2001-2005) ===
After she finished her acting studies, she started taking part at different castings as an actress but very soon she decided not to pursue a career in this field. In September 2001, she made her television debut as hostess of TV 100 daytime talk show C Throu next to Christina Kanataki. At the same time, she was hosting a daytime show as a radio producer on ANT1 Radio Thessaloniki. The two shows ran for only one season and stopped in summer of 2002.

In September 2002, she moved to Athens where she started working as a bank employee in ABN AMRO Bank for 9 months while she started studying journalism, at the Ergastiri Epagematikis Demosiographias. Furthermore, she signed with Virgin FM hosting a daytime radio show every evening for two years. She also signed with an actor's agency taking part in different popular television commercials and adverts.

In 2003, she started working on television as a journalist on the late night talk show of ALPHA Ola, with Themos Anastasiadis. After a year on the team of the show, the host Themos Anastasiadis offered the position of co-hostess for the season 2004/05 and she accepted.

=== Morning show, television success and Farmer Wants a Wife (2005-2011) ===
In the summer of 2005, she signed a contract with one of the biggest Greek television networks, MEGA. From September of the same year she was one of the co-hosts of Grigoris Arnaoutoglou on the morning television talk show, Beautiful World in the Morning. In 2005, she also made an appearance as herself on the hugely popular MEGA comedy hit, In the Nick of Time as herself. She continued appearing on the morning show for two more seasons until the summer of 2008. In 2008 she also made her acting debut playing in the comedy of Vasilis Myrianthopoulos, I Just Broke Up portraying Betty.

Right after she signed with ALPHA for the weekend morning talk show, In a really good mood as a co-host of Natalia Germanou. In 2009, she also started hosting the Greek version of the reality show Farmer Wants a Wife, Greece which run for two seasons on the prime-time slot of ALPHA. In the summer of 2011, she concluded her contract with ALPHA and the weekend show after three years. Additionally, she was cast to be the voice of the Greek version of Smurfette on The Smurfs.

=== Contract with ANT1, a pause on tv, fashion industry and YouTube (2011-2018) ===
In August 2011 she signed a contract with ANT1 when the producers decided to launch new shows on their morning slots. From October 17, she started hosting the morning entertainment talk show, Breakfast ANT1 alongside Christos Ferentinos. The show concluded on July 6, 2012, when the ANT1 network decided to stop the entertaining slot 10:00am–13:00pm. Then Christidou decided to pause her television career for six years.

In 2013, she decided to enter the fashion industry, creating and launching her own fashion brand and e-shop sissychristidou.com. The type of it was casual or formal outfits and clothes for woman of every body type. In 2017, she decided to create her own YouTube channel, named Sissy Christidou, posting her first video on September 1. A few months later, the channel gained more than 200,000 subscribers while the content she was usually creating was personal moments, family stories, beauty, nutrition and travelling. On June 3, 2018, she and her -then- husband Thodoris Marantinis launched a second YouTube channel, named Visit My Greece, from which they were presenting videos from their trips as a couple around the country. On June 27, 2018, Christidou and Marantinis performed as a duet on, 2018 - MAD Video Music Awards on a new version of the song Taste the Feeling. In same month, it was announced that she signed with OPEN, a new Greek television network, to return to the TV on the weekend program of the network.

=== Weekend morning television and exit from fashion industry and YouTube (2018-present) ===
On October 27, 2018, she made her television comeback after six years with her new morning entertaining talk show Come on, Smile! with Sissy Christidou on OPEN. The show focused mainly on celebrity news, gossip, Hollywood news and guests. On November 8 she announced the closure of her fashion brand, e-shop and store as a result of lack of time after six years.

In January 2021, the content and the focus of her television show changed presenting more news coverage and issues about social changes, such as the start of the MeToo movement in Greece. Suddenly, the ratings increased making Come on, Smile! with Sissy Christidou one of the most popular Greek tv shows. On July 4, she announced on air that she would stop her show and contract with OPEN after three years. Days after, she signed with MEGA for a spin-off of her show.

On September 11, 2021, she launched her new morning show Smile Again with Sissy Christidou on the weekend program of MEGA. There she presents an infotainment talk show with news and guests that concern the public, throughout the week. Smile Again with Sissy Christidou is now running its fifth season on air. On February 23, 2026, she made a major appearance on the MEGA drama One Night Only, portraying herself on the 43rd episode of season 1, determining the main storyline of the show.

== Filmography ==
=== Film ===
Year	Title	Role	Notes	Ref.
2008	I Just Broke Up	Betty	film debut	
2011	The Smurfs	Smurfette	voice role (in greek)	
2013	The Smurfs 2	Smurfette	voice role (in greek)	

=== Television ===
Year	Title	Role(s)	Notes
2001-2002	C Throu	Herself (host)	Daytime talk show on TV 100
2004-2005	Everything 5 with Themos Anastasiadis	Herself (co-host)	Talk show; season 6
2005	In the Nick of Time	Herself	1 episode
2005-2008	Beautiful World in the Morning	Herself (co-host)	Daytime morning show on MEGA; season 3-5
2008-2011	In a really good mood	Herself (co-host)	Weekend morning talk show on Alpha TV; season 1-3
2009-2011	Farmer Want a Wife Greece	Herself (host)	Reality show; season 1-2
2011-2012	Breakfast ANT1	Herself (host)	Daytime morning talk show on ANT1
2018	2018 - MAD Video Music Awards	Herself (performance)	TV special
2018-2021	Come on, Smile! with Sissy Christidou	Herself (host)	Weekend morning talk show on Open TV; also creator
2021–present	Smile Again with Sissy Christidou	Herself (host)	Weekend morning talk show on MEGA; also creator
2026	One Night Only	Herself	Episode #43

== Radio ==
Year	Title	Notes
2001-2002	ANT1 Radio Thessaloniki with Sissy Christidou	
2002-2004	Virgin FM with Sissy Christidou	

== Personal life ==
In 2005, Christidou began dating the singer of Onirama, Thodoris Marantinis. On August 13, 2008, she gave birth to their first son, Philipos-Rafael and one year later, on August 16, 2009, they got married. On August 29, 2013, she gave birth to their second son, Michael-Aggelos. On April 23, 2019, Christidou and Marantinis announced that they are going to get a divorce.
