= Proinos Kafes =

Proinos Kafes (English: Morning Coffee; Greek: Πρωϊνός Καφές) was a television daytime show aired by ANT1 in Greece during the period 1990–2009. Though it has received low ratings in the past years, it was one of the longest running and well known shows in Greece. The show consisted of different segments which included fashion shows, game and prizes, interviews, and live music from Greek and foreign artists.

'Proinos Kafes previous hosts': 1991-1994: Roula Koromila, 1994-1995: Popi Chatzidimitriou, 1995-2005: Eleni Menegaki, 2005-2008: Eleonora Meleti,2008-2009: Katerina Zarifi and Nikos Moutsinas, 2009: George Lianos and Despoina Kabouri, 2009: Vicky Kaya.

Since the start of the show in 1991, the show has toured different parts of Greece including different areas of Athens, Heraklio on the island of Crete, Patras, Thessaloniki and many other places in Greece.

The theme song of Proinos Kafes, was "Kalimera" - a song originally sung by Alexia Vassiliou, also known as Alexia, from her 1990 album, 'Ela Mia Nyxta'.

== Hosts ==
=== Timeline ===
| Host | Years | Seasons | | | | | | | | | | | | | | | | | | | |
| Host | Years | 1 | 2 | 3 | 4 | 5 | 6 | 7 | 8 | 9 | 10 | 11 | 12 | 13 | 14 | 15 | 16 | 17 | 18 | 19 | 20 |
|---|---|---|---|---|---|---|---|---|---|---|---|---|---|---|---|---|---|---|---|---|---|
| Nana Palaitsaki | 1990 | | | | | | | | | | | | | | | | | | | | |
| Loukia Papadaki | 1990-1991 | | | | | | | | | | | | | | | | | | | | |
| Roula Koromila | 1991-1994 | | | | | | | | | | | | | | | | | | | | |
| Popi Chatzidimitriou | 1994-1995 | | | | | | | | | | | | | | | | | | | | |
| Eleni Menegaki | 1995-2005 | | | | | | | | | | | | | | | | | | | | |
| Andreas Mikroutsikos | 2002 | | | | | | | | | | | | | | | | | | | | |
| Makis Pounentis | 2005 | | | | | | | | | | | | | | | | | | | | |
| Giota Tsibrikidou | 2005 | | | | | | | | | | | | | | | | | | | | |
| Eleonora Meleti | 2005-2008 | | | | | | | | | | | | | | | | | | | | |
| George Satsidis | 2008 | | | | | | | | | | | | | | | | | | | | |
| Nikos Moutsinas | 2008-2009 | | | | | | | | | | | | | | | | | | | | |
| Katerina Zarifi | 2008-2009 | | | | | | | | | | | | | | | | | | | | |
| Giorgos Lianos | 2009 | | | | | | | | | | | | | | | | | | | | |
| Despoina Kampouri | 2009 | | | | | | | | | | | | | | | | | | | | |
| Vicky Kaya | 2009 | | | | | | | | | | | | | | | | | | | | |

== Special hosts ==
=== Panelists ===
| Name | Duration |
|---|---|
| Takis Zaharatos | 1991-1993 |
| Dimos Milonas | 1991-1994 |
| Christos Nezos | 1991-1994 |
| Stefanos Xios | 1991-1995 |
| Vasilis Nomikos | 1992-1997 |
| Markos Seferlis | 1995-1996, 2005-2006 |
| Kostas Evripiotis | 1996-1999 |
| Pantelis Kanarakis | 1997-1999 |
| Dimitris Papanotas | 1998-2002 |
| Aggelos Pyriochos | 2000-2002 |
| Manos Magiatis | 2000-2005 |
| Grigoris Goudaras | 2001-2005 |
| Nasos Goumenidis | 2001-2007 |
| Sofi Zanninou | 2002-2004 |
| Katerina Zarifi | 2002-2005 |
| Vasilis Drymousis | 2002-2005 |
| Elena Polykarpou | 2002-2008 |
| Tenia Makri | 2003-2004 |
| Kalomira | 2005-2006 |
| Evi Droutsa | 2005-2006 |
| Thanasis Viskadourakis | 2005-2006 |
| Mara Meimaridi | 2006-2007 |
| Nana Karagianni | 2006-2008 |
| George Satsidis | 2007-2008 |
| Eleni Karpontini | 2007-2008 |
| Katerina Kainourgiou | 2008-2009 |

=== Astrology ===
| Name | Duration |
|---|---|
| Litsa Patera | 1990-2009 |

=== Cinema ===
| Name | Duration |
|---|---|
| Thodoris Koutsogiannopoulos | 1992-2005 |

=== Cooking ===
| Name | Duration |
|---|---|
| Vefa Alexiadou | 1991-2003 |
| Yannis Geldis | 2003-2006 |
| Alexandros Papandreou | 2006-2007 |
| Dina Nikolaou | 2006-2008 |
| Nikolas Sakellariou | 2007-2008 |

=== Fashion expert ===
| Name | Duration |
|---|---|
| Elina Kefi | 1991-1998 |
| Christina Lekka | 1994-1998 |
| Taria Boura | 1998-2005 |
| Katerina Stikoudi | 2006-2008 |
| Konstantinos Kaspiris | 2008-2009 |

=== Nutrition ===
| Name | Duration |
|---|---|
| Tasos Papalazarou | 1995-1997 |
| Dimitris Grigorakis | 1997-2007 |

=== Gymnastics ===
| Name | Duration |
|---|---|
| Suzan Ashby | 1990-1999 |
| Eleni Petroulaki | 1992-1993 |
| Yanna Darili | 1994-1998 |
| Giorgos Loukanidis | 1993-1998 |
| Sofia Patheka | 1997-1998 |

== See also ==
- List of programs broadcast by ANT1
