= Giannis Kapetanios =

Greek comedian and actor

- Γιάννης Καπετάνιος
- Born: February 11, 1959 (age 67); Chios, Dodecanese, Greece
- Education: Karolos Koun Art Theater Drama School
- Occupation: Comedian actor
- Years active: 1989-present
- Notable work: Tis Ellados ta Paidia; Konstantinou & Elenis

Giannis Kapetanios (born February 11, 1959) is a Greek comedian and actor of theater and television.

== Biography ==
He comes from Kourounia, Chios. His first contact with the public was at the "MERIDA" Festival in Spain, where he participated in the dance with the play "IPPIS" by Aristophanes with the "Karolos Koun" Art Theater of Karolos Koun and immediately afterwards in Epidaurus, as a first-year student of the same Drama School, from which he graduated with honors. He gained exciting experiences during his years at the School, with participation in Festival performances and at the "FRYNICHOU KAROLOS KOUN" Theater during the period 1983–1988.

For 18 years, he worked closely with Markos Seferlis in various theatrical performances and television programs, forming a popular comedy duo. However, in 2024, announced the end of this collaboration, stating that "all circles come to a close at some point" and that he wished to pursue other, more relaxing things after his retirement.
