= ANT1 Cyprus =

Cypriot television network

- Country: Cyprus
- Headquarters: Strovolos, Nicosia, Cyprus

Programming
- Language: Greek
- Picture format: 16:9 (576i, SDTV)

Ownership
- Owner: Antenna Limited
- Sister channels: ANT1; Makedonia TV

History
- Launched: 1993 (television); 1998 (radio)

Links
- Website: ANT1 Cyprus

Availability

Streaming media
- ANT1 Cyprus: ANT1 Live

Antenna, better known as ANT1, is Cyprus's third private television station. It has already demonstrated 30 years of dynamic and credible presence in the market. The station launched in 1993, 4 years after establishing the ANT1 in Greece in 1989. Since its formation, the station has been the leader in ratings in its news bulletins and local series. ANT1 wholly supplies Greek programs in Greece, and foreign entertainment ranges from daily series to shows and blockbuster films.

The company also formed ANT1 Radio 102,7 - 103,7 in 1998, mainly focused on the entertainment aspect, with high-quality entertainment and informative programs that attract tens of thousands of listeners daily, anytime and anywhere. About its online presence, ant1live.com covers breaking news, sports, lifestyle news, and broadcasts. It also includes ANT1 TV and radio streams for free. The online produces both status and ratings and together, which was the company's main focus. The television unit established a firm status of the ANTENNA brand image as the most solid presence in the media world of Cyprus.

New but solidified to this experience is the expertise, implementation, and knowledge in the field of Digital Media. The proliferation of users using Social Media Platforms arouses ANTENNA's desire to disseminate news, videos, events, or everything that has to do with broadcasting and screening, engage with users, and provide a trustworthy source of newscasts through its various Social Media Platforms, like Facebook, YouTube, Instagram, Messenger, Twitter, etc.

== Programming ==
Current shows include:

- Proino ANT1
- Mera Mesimeri
- ANT1 News

=== Realities ===
- Dancing with the Stars – the Greek version of the reality program, third season ongoing. Hosted by Zeta Makripoulia.
- The Biggest Game Show in the World – Reality television show. Hosted by Nantia Mpoule. It will premiere in the fall of 2013.
- Krata Gera – Reality television show. Hosted by Giorgos Lianos. It premiered in the fall of 2013.
- Wipeout – the Greek version of the American reality show which entered its second season in the fall of 2011. Hosted by Giorgos Lianos.
- Plaka Kaneis – Prank reality television show, much like the format used on Candid Camera. Hosted by Savvas Poumpouras and Dimitris Vlachos.
- Dancing on Ice – the Greek version of the English reality show dance competition with one season. Hosted by Jenny Balatsinou.
- FAB 5 – the Greek version of American reality show Queer Eye, one season done.
- Black Out – 2011 game show, one season done. Hosted by Nadia Boule.
- Meet the Parents – the Greek version of the English reality show, one season is done. Hosted by Savvas Poumpouras.
- Fast Money! – the Greek version of Family Feud, hosted by Markos Seferlis.

=== Television series ===
==== Cypriot ====
- H Goiteia Ths Amartias (The allure of sin), drama (2002)
- Deikse mou to filo sou, comedy (2006–2007)
- Tin Patisa, comedy (2007–2008)
- I Zoi Einai Oraia, comedy (2008–2009)
- Gia Thn Agapi Sou, drama,romance (2008–2009)
- Aigia Fouxia, comedy (2008–2010)
- Panselinos (Full Moon), soap opera (2009–2011)
- Eleni I Porni, a drama based on a real story (2010–2011)
- Premier (Premiere), a drama based on a real story (2011–2012)
- Santa Giolanta, comedy (2011–2012)
- O, ti Agapisa, soap opera (2011–2012)
- Like, Like ise edo?, family comedy (2011–2012)
- Noise Me (Feel Me), soap opera (2012–2014)
- Vals Me 12 Theous, based on the homonym book (2012–2014)
- Ekino To Kalokairi (That Summer), a drama based on a real story (2012–2013)

==== Greek ====
- Kales Douleies, family comedy (2014–present)
- Brousko, soap opera (2013–present)
- To Amartima tis Mitros mou, family comedy (2012–2013)
- Eleftheros kai Oraios, comedy (2012)
- Einai Stigmes, soap opera (2012)
- Steps, Teen Drama (2011)

==== English ====
- Game of Thrones (United States)
- Grey's Anatomy (United States)
- House (United States)
- Private Practise (United States)
- Castle (United States)
- Nikita (United States)
- Power Rangers (United States)
- Horseland (United States)
- VR Troopers (United States)
- The Angry Beavers (United States)
- CatDog (United States)

==== Spanish ====
- Amores verdaderos (Mexico)
- La Tempestad (Mexico)
- Eva Luna (United States)
- Triunfo del amor (Mexico)
- Soy tu dueña (Mexico)
- Corazón salvaje (Mexico)
- Sortilegio (Mexico)
- La fea más bella (Mexico)
- Floricienta (Argentina)
- Patito Feo (Argentina)
- Rebelde Way (Argentina)
- Romeo y Julieta (Argentina)

==== Japanese ====
- Sailor Moon (Japan)
- Dragon Ball (Japan)
