= Christidou =

Christidou (Greek: Χρηστίδου) is a surname, the feminine form of Christidis. Notable people with the surname include:

- Rallia Christidou (born 1979), Greek singer
- Sissi Christidou (born 1980), Greek television presenter and YouTuber
