= Panselinos =

- Also known as: Full moon
- Πανσέληνος
- Genre: soap opera, thriller
- Country of origin: Cyprus
- Original language: Greek

Production
- Production locations: Nicosia; Cyprus

Original release
- Network: ANT1
- Release: September 2009 – May 2011

Panselinos is a Cypriot soap opera that was broadcast from 2009 to 2011 by ANT1 Cyprus. The show gained notoriety for the unforgettable role of Nixteridas (Greek: Νυχτερίδας), one of the most iconic villains in Cyprus television.

The primary actors included Memos Mpegnis.
