= Just Broke Up =

I Just Broke Up
- Directed by: Vasilis Myrianthopoulos
- Starring: Zeta Makrypoulia; Yannis Tsimitselis
- Release date: 14 February 2008
- Country: Greece
- Language: Greek

I Just Broke Up (Greek: Μόλις Χώρισα/Molis horisa) is a 2008 Greek comedy film directed by Vassilis Myrianthopoulos, starring Zeta Makripoulia and Giannis Tsimitselis. The film was one of the highest grossing Greek films of 2008.

== Plot ==
The theme of the film is the break-up of a couple, namely Ilektra (Zeta Makripoulia) and Petros (Giannis Tsimitselis) on the former's birthday in modern-day Athens in Greece. The break-up occurs by Petros leaving a message on Ilektra's answering machine asking her to break up with him. The message is overheard by Ilektra's friends who are currently in her apartment preparing a surprise birthday party for her. They decide to hide the truth from her until after the party. What follows is a series of misunderstandings between Ilektra and her friends: Mary, Dimitris (Mary's boyfriend), Lou, Mitsos and her mother. The situation is further perplexed by Vittor, a Spaniard and Lou's chance acquaintance, an uninvited tapperwoman, Titika Karlatira, and a pizza-boy.

== Cast ==
- Zeta Makripoulia
- Giannis Tsimitselis
- Elisavet Konstadinidou
- Maria Lekaki
- Giorgos Karamixos
- Anna Monogiou
- Iosif Poloyidis
- Sissi Christidou
- Maria Bakodimou
- Kimon Fioretos
- Tommy Slavos
