= Ta Nea tou ANT1 =

- Also known as: ANT1 News
- Genre: News
- Presented by: Nikos Hadjinikolaou
- Country of origin: Greece
- Original language: Greek

Production
- Production locations: Athens, Greece

Original release
- Network: ANT1
- Release: 31 December 1989 – present

ΤΑ ΝΕΑ ΤΟΥ ΑΝΤ1 (also branded on air as ANT1 News) is a Greek news television programme. Aired on ANT1 since 1989, it is hosted by Nikos Hadjinikolaou as part of the ANT1 News programme.

== See also ==
- List of programs broadcast by ANT1
