= Eleni Menegaki =

Greek television presenter

- Born: 29 October 1969 (age 56); Athens, Greece
- Occupation: TV Hostess
- Years active: 1991-present
- Spouses: Stavros Garderis (m. 1989; div. 1990) Giannis Latsios (m. 2001; div. 2010) Makis Pantzopoulos (m. 2015)
- Children: Aggelos Latsios; Laura Latsiou; Valeria Latsiou; Marina Pantzopoulou
- Relatives: Zeta Menegaki (mother); Thodoris Misokalos (brother); Grigoris Bithikotsis (great-uncle)

Eleni Menegaki (Greek: Ελένη Μενεγάκη; (born 29 October, 1969), is a Greek TV presenter, model and businesswoman. After she started her modeling career in the mid 80's as a model for different television adverts, magazines and video clips she pursued a career as a co-hostess in different popular tv shows such as Cocktail and Mega Banca.

In 1994 she had the lead role in the ANT1 sitcom Our Father (1994-1996) next to the popular protagonist Kostas Karras. In 1995 she started her successful longtime career on daytime television, hosting popular shows such as Morning Coffee (1995-2005), Coffee with Eleni (2005-2011) and Eleni with Eleni Menegaki (2011-2020; 2021-2024). Also from 1996 to 2005, she was hosting the National Beauty Pageant of Greece, the most successful beauty contest of the country, on ANT1 being the most long-running hostess of the show. In 2010, Forbes ranked Menegaki as the second-most powerful and influential celebrity in Greece and top-ranked female. On July 2024, she announced that she would pause her presence on daytime television after 33 years.

== Career ==
=== Television ===
==== MEGA Channel (1991–1994) ====
Eleni Menegaki, went to a modeling school and started her career as a model in 1986. She starred in photoshoots, t.v adverts and video clips. In 1991 she participated in the MEGA Channel morning show, “Cocktail” (also known as “Morning Cocktail”). A year later, she and Giorgos Polichroniou hosted the highly successful game show "MEGA Banca."

==== ANT1 (1994- 2005) ====
In 1994, she started in the successful ANT1 comedy TV show "Pater Imon" portraying a radio producer. The next year, she began hosting the ANT1 morning show Proinos Kafes . She continued hosting the show for 10 years with great success and soon the media named her "Queen of the morning zone." She also hosted, with great success, the Beauty pageants, “Miss Young” in 1994, “Aphrodite” in 1995 and 1996 and “Star Hellas-Miss Hellas-Miss Young”, from 1996–2005.

==== ALPHA TV (2005–2020) ====
In 2005, she left ANT1 and signed to Alpha TV . She became the hostess of the morning show "Kafes me tin Eleni." Despite low ratings in the first season, it soon became a great success, especially in the commercial target group 15–44 years of age. In its last season (2010-2011), "Kafes me tin Eleni" suffered the lowest ratings ever.

In 2011, Menegaki's show changed its time starting at 13:00 and aired under the new title "Eleni." TV ratings have fluctuated. In May 2020, she announced that this will be her last season doing the show as she decided to take a break.

==== MEGA Channel (2021– 2024) ====
In April 2021, Mega Channel announced that Menegaki would be on their channel presenting a new show on week days at 13:00 which is called “Εleni”. Ιn July 2024 she decided to end her career in daytime television.

=== Advertising - Campaigns - Collaborations ===
She made her first commercial in 1986. In 1988 the musician Manos Hadjidakis chose her to be on the cover of his magazine “To Tetarto” The next one was in 1990, for the coffee company, “Melita”. In the same year, she also played in a commercial for the "Ultrex" shampoo company. In 1991, she was in the T.V advert, “Alsa cream”.In 1992, she starred in two companies commercials, "Risonatto” for the company “Knorr” and "To Lambero" for the promotion of sunflower oil. In 1993, she appeared in an advertisement for the "Famozo" window cleaner. In 1995, she advertised the “Laiko Lahio”.In 1996, she promoted “Paxos” school bags. From 1996-1997, she took part in the “T.V Zapping magazine”, advert. In 1998, she promoted the “Prinou slimming center”. In 2004, she advertised the “Libero” diapers. In the 2010–2011 season ,she was the main person of the skin care company, "Olay" for the promotion of the new face cream. From 2014-2015, she advertised the, “Axel” clothes and accessories line. From 2015 until 2019, she collaborated with the cosmetics company, "L'Oréal Paris Greece" for hair dyes, face cream, serum and lipstick.Also, from 2018 to 2019 she collaborated with the company "Fage", for the yogurt "Ageladitsa". From 2023-2024, she promoted “Lux Shampoo”.

In 2006, she presented the T.V Marathon programme on ALPHA, “Praksi Elpidas”, together with the organization “Elpida”, to fund a new hospital for cancer patients in Athens. In 2007, all the major T.V networks worked together in a T.V Marathon to raise funds, for the people who suffered from the wildfires of that year. Menegaki, represented ALPHA and co-hosted together with another six T.V presenters.From 2014-15 and from 2018-2019, she participated in the campaign to fight women’s breast cancer, for the organization “Alma Zois”. In 2017, together with the reporter Kostas Arvanitedes, she presented the “T.V Marathon of Love for UNICEF 2017”, on ERT2. In December 2020, she helped raise funds with the “Efhostolidia” by OPAP, to fulfill children’s wishes from the organizations, “Hamogelo tou Paidiou”, “Pedika Horia SOS” and ELEPAP.In 2023, she took part in Mega Channel’s campaign about violence against women. In 2024, she advertised the vaccine for the HPV virus.

During her career, Eleni Menegaki received numerous industry awards. Spanning a 33 year television career that lasted from 1991 to 2024, she remained one of the most frequently photographed and widely admired media personalities in Greece.

== Filmography ==
=== Television ===
Year	Title	Role	Notes
1991-1992	Cocktail	Herself (co-host)	Daily talk show (season 3)
1992	Ah Eleni	minister's secretary	1 episode
1992	Ta Bakouria	Kris Catarahias	Episodes: "To proxenio sto klouvi me tis treles" & Diazygio ala Katarahia"
1992-1995	Mega Banca / Mega Banca Show	Herself (co-host)	Daily game show on Mega Channel
1993	Incredible but Greek	gang girl / girl in present	3 episodes
1994	Miss Young Beauty Pageant	Herself (host)	TV special
1994-1996	Our Father	Eleni Alexaki	Lead role; 54 episodes
1995	Aphrodite Beauty Pageant	Herself (co-host)	TV special
1996	Aphrodite Beauty Pageant	Herself (host)	TV special
1995-2005	Morning Coffee	Herself (host)	Morning talk show on ANT1
1996-2005	National Beauty Pageant-Star Hellas	Herself (host)	TV special
2006	T.V Marathon- Praksi Elpidas	Herself (host)	TV special on ALPHA
1997	Crush	Herself	1 episode
1998	Nanny for everything	Herself	1 episode
1999	2000 Wishes	Herself (co-host)	TV special
2000	Pop Corn Music Awards	Herself (host)	TV special
2005-2011	Coffee with Eleni	Herself (host)	Morning talk show on Alpha TV; also executive producer
2006 2007	Television Awards by Ethnos	Herself (host)	TV special
2006	T.V Marathon for Wildfires	Herself	TV special- Alpha, Alter, ANT1, Macedonia T.V, Mega, Skai, STAR
2011-2020	Eleni	Herself (host)	Daytime talk show on Alpha TV; also executive producer
2014	From a different story	Herself	Voice role, 1 episode
2017	T.V Marathon of Love for UNICEF 2017	Herself (co-host)	TV special on ERT2
2017	Don't start moaning	Herself	1 episode
2021-2024	Eleni	Herself (host)	Daytime talk show on Mega Channel; also executive producer

=== Music Videos ===
Year	Title	Artist	Notes
1988	"Don't betray me!	Pascalis	
1990	"You provoke me"	Michalis Rakintzis	
1991	"Unintentionally"	Antypas	
1991	"I don't change you"	Antypas	
1991	"It was my honor"	Antypas	
1991	"Only one sign from you"	Antypas	
1998	"Crying"	Lambis Livieratos	
1999	"Last night in my dream"	Stamatis Gonidis	

=== TV commercials ===
Year	Title	Notes
1990	Melita	
1990	Ultrex	
1992	Risonatto Knorr	
1992	To Labero	
1995	Laiko Lahio	
1996	Paxos	
1996	Famozo	
1996-1997	T.V Zapping	
1998	Prinou Adinatisma	
2003-2004	Lux	
2004	Libero	
2010-2011	Olay	
2015-2024	L'Oreal Paris Greece	
2018-2019	Fage Yogurt	

== Personal life ==
Menegaki has been married three times and has four children from her second and third marriages.

At the age of 20, Menegaki married Greek shop owner Stavros Garderis but they divorced one year later.

In 2001, Menegaki married ANT1's then program manager Giannis Latsios. On November 15, 2002, she gave birth to their first child a son, Aggelos-Ioannis. On February 9, 2005, she gave birth to their second child, a daughter Laura, and three years later, on January 28, 2008, their third child, a second daughter, Valeria was born. In January 2010, Menegaki announced their divorce.

In 2010, Menegaki began dating Greek entrepreneur Makis Pantzopoulos. On March 29, 2015, she gave birth to their daughter, Marina and they were married the same year.

== Public image and impact ==
With the success of her morning show, Menegaki became the most successful celebrity in Greece. She is followed by paparazzi and makes headlines everywhere. Her divorce from Giannis Latsios became a controversial and highly discussed topic.
