= DeAgostini Hellas =

Greek publishing company

De Agostini Hellas commenced its operations in Greece in 1995 and it became within a very short time one of the leading publishing companies. As of 2006, De Agostini is one of the three largest, in revenue, publishing companies in Greece.

De Agostini was the first to introduce the concept of partworks in Greece. Partworks are series in issues with average lifecycle of two years. Their content covers a wide range of interests and ages and has an educational character or an entertaining-collective one. Moreover, the issues are sometimes accompanied by collectible miniatures, relevant to the topic of the collection. Partworks are exclusively sold in kiosks.

De Agostini ceased all commercial operations in Greece in 2016.

== See also ==
- De Agostini
