= Argiro Barbarigou =

Greek chef, cookbook writer and TV presenter

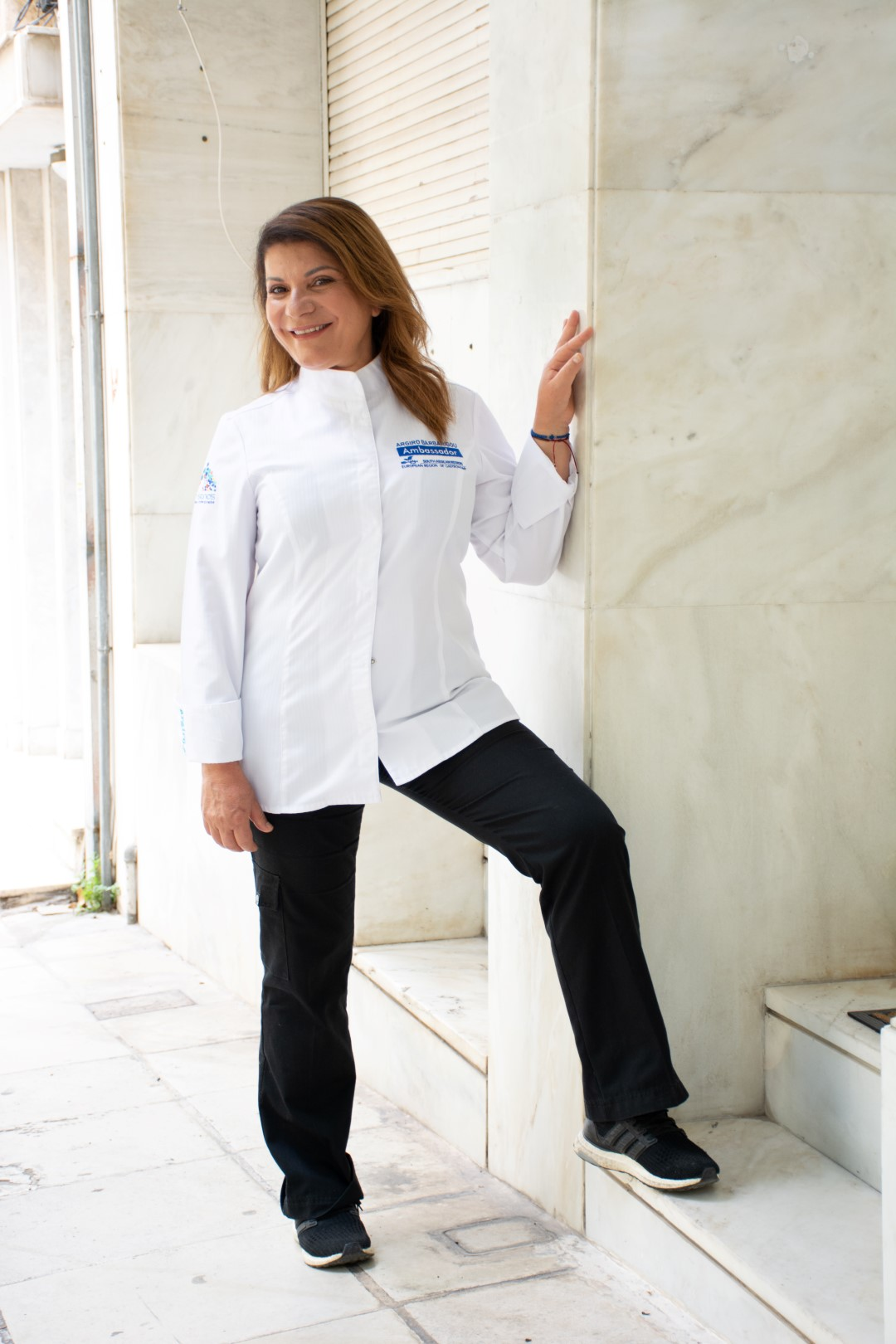
- Barbarigou in 2019
- Born: October 22, 1967 (age 58); Naousa, Paros, Greece
- Education: Ecode Du Grand Chocolat Valhrona; Le Cordon Bleu
- Spouse: Manolis Manolakis
- Children: 1
- Culinary career
- Cooking style: Greek
- Television shows: Alpha TV "Eleni" (2018–present); ANT1 "To Proino" (2011–17); ANT1 "Tis Alpha Ta Zymomata" (2007–present); ANT1 Satellite "I Ellada sto Piato" (2014–2015); ANT1 "Oreo Cookieng" (2012–2013); ANT1 "10 me 1 Mazi" (2009–2011); Alpha TV "Kafes me tin Eleni" (2006–2009); Mega "Omorfos Kosmos to Prwi" (2003–2004); Alpha TV "Kalos Tous" (2002–2003)
- Awards won: Global Ambassador of South Aegean Gastronomy (2019); Woman of the Year – Greek TopWomen Awards(2019); Restaurant 100 Award – Papadakis Restaurant (2018); UNESCO Contribution Award – Papadakis Restaurant (2018); UNESCO award Top Woman, excellence and contributions to Greek Gastronomy(2017); Global Ambassador of Sustainability for the European Commission (2014); Best TV Chef Cookbook – GourmandCookbook Awards (2014); Ambassador of Greek and Parian Cuisine (2013); Global Culinary Ambassador – Chef Club N.Greece – US Congress (2013); Service to the Industry – Epicurian Club Boston (2011); Woman Chef – Gourmand Cookbook Awards (2010); Best Greek Cuisine – Papadakis Restaurant – Toques D'OR (2009); Recognition of Global communication of cuisine – Le Monde (2009); Woman of the Year – Life & Style (2008); Best Greek Cuisine – Papadakis Restaurant – Gourmet Magazine (2006&2007); Best Local Cookbook – GourmandCookbook Awards (2002)
- Website: https://www.argiro.gr/

Argiro Barbarigou (born October 22, 1967) is a Greek celebrity chef, restaurateur and cookbook author. She is also the Ambassador for the North and South Aegean, European Region of Gastronomy, Global Ambassador of Authentic Greek Cuisine. Argiro focuses on Greek cuisine.

== Early life ==
Barbarigou was born and raised on the island of Paros to Kostanza and Ioannis Barbarigou. She has one sister Nikoletta Barbarigou. In the 1970s, Barbarigou's father owned and ran a restaurant in Paros called Papadakis. Growing up she spent most of her free time assisting and helping their family restaurant.

== Education ==
Having already worked in their family restaurant in Paros for over 10 years, she studied as a Chef at the Le Cordon Bleu School of Cooking in London. She studied as a Pastry Chef at the Valhrona Ecole du Grand Chocolat in Paris and at Stelios Parliaro's Pastry Chef School in Greece.

== Restaurateur, chef, entrepreneur ==
Barbarigou revived her father's Papadakis restaurant in March 1996 by re-opening the restaurant's doors in Naoussa, Paros. Papadakis presented an Aegean Cuisine menu with an emphasis on fish, seafood and authentic local products from all over Greece.

In 2005, Barbarigou opened her second Papadakis restaurant set at the foothills of Mt. Lycabettus in Athens. A Paros-inspired eatery the restaurant offers a menu focused on seafood and traditional Greek recipes with a modern presentation.

In 2014, Barbarigou launched Homey, a new restaurant concept in the Northern suburbs.

In 2015, Barbarigou launched a series of new food retail products under her personal brand in all major supermarkets in Greece. The same year, she designed the menu for Alfa Piehouse and launched an exclusive line of cookware in collaboration with the Greek advertising agency, J.W. Spot Thomson and the Greek supermarket chain, Delhaize Group AB.

She is currently working on several projects including the opening of her latest restaurant in the West End district of Washington D.C.

In 2020, her show "Ώρα για Φαγητό με την Αργυρώ – Ora gia Fagito me tin Argiro," aired on SKAI. The show focused on Greek cuisine, and went on for two seasons.

In 2022, Barbarigou launched her redesigned website. The same year, she was named Ambassador of Gastronomy for the North Aegean Region, and she went on to promote the cuisine of the region in London at the National Geographic Traveller Food Festival.

In 2023, Barbarigou co-wrote the book "Από στόμα σε στόμα, Θησαυροί της Ελληνικής Κουζίνας - Apo Stoma se Stoma, Thisauroi tis Ellinikis Kouzinas," with Dietitian - Nutritionist Dr. Anastasios Papalazarou. Later in the year, she joined More Media, a new company by Alter Ego Media S.A. With More Media, she publishes video and print media content, including the magazines 'Πεντανόστιμα - Pentanostima' and 'Ελληνική Κουζίνα - Elliniki Kouzina,' which promote Greek cuisine and local producers from various regions across Greece.

== Culinary ambassador ==
Barbarigou represents Greece and the European Union in events in her titles as Global Ambassador of Greek Cuisine and also as Ambassador of South Aegean Mediterranean Cuisine. She has taken part in a multitude of events that have ranged from cooking for the US Congress, cooking for Congress and President Bill Clinton, Head Chef and planner for Disney's"OPA! A Celebration of Greece", Keynote Speaker at the Worldchefs 37th Annual Congress, digitally in the WOW Greece campaign, representing Greece in the 32nd Annual Chefs Tribute to City Meals on Wheels, cooking for the members of the James Beard Foundation, Judge and President for the ICAAP "European Young Chef Award".

In 2018, she was named Ambassador of Aegean Cuisine by the European Commission which designated Greece's South Aegean a "Region of Gastronomy".

== Humanitarian ==
Argiro takes part in a multitude of notable Greek and foreign causes, including the One Greece campaign, which raised awareness and funds for Greece's economic recovery at The Hellenic Initiative inaugural gala in New York City, where she presided as guest celebrity chef for honorary chair President Bill Clinton and donors. Other contributions include spokesperson for the Global Aids Campaign, motivational speaker for female inmates in Greece's correctional system, the crisis awareness WOW Greece campaign, the Annual Chefs Tribute to City Meals on Wheels and mentoring chef for Greece's orphans and foster children in her role as Ambassador of SOS Children's Villages Greece

== Cookbook author ==
Argiro has received multiple awards, including three from the French Gourmand Awards. Her monthly magazine is the No. 1 selling magazine in Greece in the category of Greek culinary. The magazine features topics of culinary interest for all ages and genders including a Monthly Menu, Unique Greek Ingredients, Cooking with Children, Delicious Sweets, Healthy recipes and Gluten free.

== TV career ==
Argiro's first public TV appearance was on the channel ERT1 for the documentary "ΝΥΝ ΚΑΙ ΑΕΙ", which highlighted Aegean Island life as it was in the 90s. She followed this appearance with more regular appearances on Mega Channel on the show "Καλώς Τους – Kalos Tous". This led to a rise in recognition, which earned her her first daily appearances on the morning show "Ομορφος Κοσμος το Πρωί – Omorfos Kosmos To Proi" on Mega Channel.

=== TV appearances/host ===
- 2025 – 2026 MEGA "Χαμογέλα και Πάλι!"
- 2025 BBC "Master Chef UK"
- 2023 – 2024 MEGA "Ελένη"
- 2022 – 2023 ANT1 "Το Πρωινό"
- 2020 – 2022 SKAI "Ώρα για Φαγητό με την Αργυρώ"
- 2019 COSMOTE HISTORY "Aegean Mamas Know Best"
- 2018 – 2019 ALPHA "Ελένη"
- 2013 – 2017 ΑΝΤ1 "Το Πρωινό"
- 2014 – 2016 ΑΝΤ1 "Της ALFA Τα Ζυμώματα"
- 2014 – 2016 ΑΝΤ1 Satellite "Η ΕΛΛΑΔΑ ΣΤΟ ΠΙΑΤΟ"
- 2012 – 2013 ΑΝΤ1 "Oreo Cookieng"
- 2011 – 2012 ΑΝΤ1 "Το Πρωινό"
- 2009 – 2011 ΑΝΤ1 "10 ΜΕ 1 ΜΑΖΙ"
- 2006 – 2009 ALPHA "Καφές με την Ελένη"
- 2003 – 2004 MEGA "Όμορφος Κόσμος το Πρωί"
- 2002 – 2003 ALPHA "Καλώς τους"
- 2018 – today YouTube "Keep Cooking"

== Educator ==
Argiro teaches Greek cuisine courses and offers seminars as phyllo dough expert at the Greek cooking school, Le Monde.

== Awards and recognitions ==
Argiro has received numerous awards, a list of notable awards:

- 2022: Ambassador of North Aegean Cuisine, Athens, Greece
- 2019: Ambassador of South Aegean Cuisine, Athens, Greece
- 2019: Greek TopWomen Award – Eirinika.gr, Athens, Greece
- 2018: Restaurant 100 Award for Papadakis restaurant, Athens, Greece
- 2018: Honorary Distinction of Social Contribution of Papadakis Restaurant, UNESCO Πειραιώς και Νήσων, Athens, Greece
- 2017: President and chair of the European Young Chef Award, Barcelona, Spain
- 2017: Awarded for her Contribution to Greek Gastronomy as a Woman of the Year, UNESCO Πειραιώς και Νήσων, Athens, Greece
- 2014: Ambassador and public spokesperson of the European Campaign «Αφήνω το γόνο...να γίνει γονιός», European Commission
- 2014: Best TV Chef Cookbook "ΕΛΛΑΔΑ ΜΟΥ» Gourmand Awards, Paris France
- 2013: Ambassador of Greek & Parian Cuisine, Municipality of Paros Greece
- 2013: Global Culinary Ambassador, Chef Club of Northern Greece, United States Congress, Washington D.C, USA
- 2011: Awarded Service to the Industry for promoting Greek Cuisine, Epicurian Chef Club of Boston, MA USA
- 2010: Cookbook Award in the category "Women Chef", Gourmand Awards, Paris France
- 2009: Best Greek Cuisine, Papadakis Restaurant, Toques D'OR, Athens Greece
- 2009: Awarded for promoting Greek Cuisine and Gastronomy Abroad, Le Monde, Athens, Greece
- 2008: Woman of the Year (Category Best Woman Chef), LIFE & STYLE Magazine, Athens, Greece
- 2006–2007: Best Greek Cuisine, Papadakis Restaurant, Gourmet, Athens, Greece
- 2002: Best local Cookbook, "ΣΥΝΤΑΓΕΣ ΤΟΥ ΑΙΓΑΙΟΥ", Gourmand Awards, Paris France
