= Zeta Makripoulia =

Greek model, actress and television presenter

Zeta Makrypoulia
- Ζέτα Μακρυπούλια
- Born: Agoritsa Zoe Makrypoulia; 31 July 1978 (age 48); Athens, Greece
- Occupations: Actress; TV hostess; former model
- Years active: 1991–present
- Partner(s): Antonis Remos (1999–2007); Michalis Hatzigiannis (2010–2021)

Zeta Makrypoulia (Greek: Ζέτα Μακρυπούλια; born 31 July 1978) is a Greek actress, TV hostess and model. She started her career in 1991, at the age of 13, as a model taking part in numerous campaigns, photoshoots and TV spots. Early in her career she also made her television debut as co-hostess in various successful talk shows as ET2 Hours Together with Titika Stasinopoulou (1991–92), Ciao ANT1 with Roula Koromila (1992–94), Magazino (1993–94) and Bravo with Roula Koromila (1994–95).

In 1994 she also made her acting debut in different TV series as The lawyers of Athens (1994), Divorced with children (1996), while in 1996 she decided to follow theatre and acting studies in Vasilis Diamantopoulos' Higher Drama School. After her first leading roles in different television comedies she gained huge fame in 2005 with the role of Amalia Antonopoulou in huge MEGA hit In the Nick of Time (2005–07). In 2008 she made her film debut in Just Broke Up while followed other film successes as S.E.X. – Soula Ela Xana (2009), Wog Boy 2: Kings of Mykonos (2010), Liar Wanted (2010) and Really so sudden (2014). Despite her presence as an a-list actress in television, cinema and theatre she also hosted high-rated TV shows as Baby Dance (2008), Dancing with the Stars (2010–13), Just the 2 of Us (2014) while from 2017 she hosts the ANT1 daytime game show Rouk Zouk.

== Career ==
Makripoulia graduated from Vasilis Diamantopoulos' Drama School in 1994, while she has also attended acting classes at Theatro ton Allagon. Then she started appearing on television and has participated in various shows and commercials for the last years. She also has worked in various television productions. Makripoulia appeared in the hit series Sto Para Pente, with her performance as a naive village girl in the series. Zeta and actor/scriptwriter Giorgos Kapoutzidis were commentators of the 51st Eurovision Song Contest in Athens. Aside from television productions Zeta has also appeared on stage, debuting for the first time in 2005 in the theatrical play "Sesouar gia Dolofonous". For the past years, she has also been working as a radio DJ for well-known radio stations, including Ciao FM and Sfera 102.2'. In 2010 she starred in Wog Boy 2: Kings of Mykonos alongside Nick Giannopoulos and Vince Colosimo as Zoe, the love interest of Giannopoulos' character. From 2010 to 2012 she presented the Greek version of Dancing with the Stars.

== Personal life ==
=== Origin ===
Makripoulia's origin is from village Potamoula, Parakampylia, Aetolia-Acarnania.

=== Family ===
Makripoulia has two brothers Panagiotis and Akis.

=== Relationships ===
From 1994 to 1997, Makripoulia was in a relationship with gymnast Kostas Alibertis.

From March 1999 to September 2007, Makripoulia was in a relationship with Greek singer Antonis Remos.

From June 2010 to February 2021, Makripoulia was in a relationship with Cypriot singer-songwriter Michalis Hatzigiannis. They met at Mad VMA 2010.

== Filmography ==
=== Film ===
Year	Title	Role	Notes	Ref.
2007	Meet the Robinsons	Franny Robinson (voice)	Voice in Greek-language version	
2008	Just Broke Up	Ilektra		
2009	S.E.X. – Soula Ela Xana	Soula Saribougiouki		
2010	Wog Boy 2: Kings of Mykonos	Zoe		
2010	G-Force	Juarez (voice)	Voice in Greek-language version	
2010	Liar Wanted	Jenny Fereki		
2014	Really so sudden	Athena		
2021	A trip to the stars	Kallirroi		
2027	Just Broke Up Again	Ilektra	upcoming film	

=== Television ===
Year	Title	Role(s)	Notes
1991–1992	ET2 Hours Together	Herself (co-host)	Sunday talk show on ET2
1992–1994	Ciao Ant1	Herself (co-host)	Variety talk show on ANT1; season 1–2
1993–1994	Magazino	Herself (host)	Daytime talk show on ET1
1994	The lawyers of Athens	Ismini Drakaki	Episode: "A rape and its idol"
1994–1995	Bravo with Roula Koromila	Herself (co-host)	Saturday variety talk show; season 1
1996	Divorced with children	Aliki Bandi	Main role, 11 episodes
1997–1998	MAD Zone	Herself (host)	Daytime talk show on MAD TV
2000–2001	The Confusion	Annoula	Lead role, 26 episodes
2001–2002	Airy Silences	Vana	Recurring role, 12 episodes
2002	Nirvana		5 episodes
2002–2003	Miss Daisy	Vasia	Lead role, 20 episodes
2004–2005	Solo Career	Fylio	Lead role, 21 episodes
2005	Safe Sex TV Stories	Kler	Episode: "Rain, snow"
2005	2005 Madame Figaro Awards - Women of the Year	Herself (host)	TV special
2005–2007	In the Nick of Time	Amalia Antonopoulou	Main role, 22 episodes
2006	Feel the fun	Herself (host)	Talk show
2006	Seven Deadly Mothers-In-Law	Alexia	Episodes: "The Mother-In-Law from Thessaloniki"
2006	Safe Sex TV Stories	Eleni	Episode: "The cell 33"
2006	Eurovision Song Contest 2006	Herself (commentator)	TV special
2006–2007	Only You	Mandia	Lead role, 20 episodes
2007	MEGA Telethon - Chain of love for the Hope	Herself (host)	TV special
2007	2007 Cyprus Annual Music Awards	Herself (host)	TV special
2007–2008	Yungermann	Dinah Sklavoyanni	Lead role, 6 episodes
2008	Baby Dance	Herself (host)	Talent show; 12 episodes
2008–2009	The key of heaven	Sophia Antonopoulou	Lead role, 26 episodes
2009	2009 Madame Figaro Awards - Women of the Year	Herself (host)	TV special
2009–2010	4	Vicky	7 episodes
2010	Star Wars	Renata Kardakou	Episodes: "A for vendetta"
2010	2010 MAD Video Music Awards	Herself (performance)	TV special
2010–2013	Dancing with the Stars	Herself (host)	Season 1–3
2011	2010 Men Of the Year Cyprus	Herself (host)	TV special
2012	2011 Men Of the Year Cyprus	Herself (host)	TV special
2013	2012 Men Of the Year Cyprus	Herself (host)	TV special
2014	Just the 2 Of Us	Herself (host)	Season 2
2015	2014 Madame Figaro Awards - Women of the Year	Herself (host)	TV special
2016–2017	Farewell my sweet co-mother-in-law	Sophia Giovani	Lead role, 12 episodes
2017	Your Face Sounds Familiar	Herself (guest judge)	Live 4; Season 4
2017-today	Rouk Zouk	Herself (host)	Daytime game show on ANT1; season 5–13
2018	Sunday Live	Herself (host)	Sunday variety show; 4 episodes
2019	2018 Madame Figaro Awards - Women of the Year	Herself (host)	TV special
2019	The Final 4	Herself (host)	Talent show; 10 episodes
2022	Wild Bees: The Last Flutter	Herself (host)	TV special
2025	2025 Madame Figaro Awards - Women of the Year	Herself (host)	TV special
2025	In the Nick of Time - 20 Years Later	Amalia Antonopoulou / Herself	MEGA TV special
2026-present	Moments with Zeta Makrypoulia	Herself (host)	Variety talk show; also creator

=== Theatre ===
- 2004 – 2006: Sesouar Gia Dolofonous
- 2006 – 2007: S' Agapo, Se Latrevo, Horizoume
- 2007: Mideia
- 2007 – 2008: T' Oneiro Tis Diplanis Portas
- 2008 – 2009: Stis kouzines
- 2009 – 2010: Ena Paidi Metraei T' Astra
- 2010 – 2011: Tiflosourtis
- 2012 – 2013: Ta Vaftisia
- 2013 – 2014: Sugar – Merikoi To Protimoun Kauto
- 2015: Irthes Kai Tha Meineis
