= Kalimera Ellada =

- Genre: morning show
- Presented by: Giorgos Papadakis 1992 -2025; Panagiotis Stathis 2025-2026; Anna Livathinou 2025-2026; Stefanos Siscos 2026; Vasilis Chiotis 2026–present Akis Pavlopoulos 2026–present
- Country of origin: Greece
- Original language: Greek
- No. of seasons: 36

Original release
- Network: ANT1
- Release: 28 April 1992; 1 July 2011; 7 September 2015; 4 July 2025; 15 September 2025-

Kalimera Ellada (Greek: Καλημέρα Ελλάδα; English: Good Morning Greece) is a television morning program aired by ANT1 on 28 April 1992 until 1 July 2011 and revived on 7 September 2015 until 4 July 2025 and hosted by Giorgos Papadakis. Contents of the program, which is very famous in its country, includes country and local news, daily presentation of newspaper's frontpages, etc.

== See also ==
- List of programs broadcast by ANT1
