= Antypas =

Greek Laïko singer

- Αντύπας
- Born: Antypas Masloumidis Greek: Αντύπας Μασλουμίδης; 6 March 1954 (age 72); Neapolis, Thessaloniki, Greece
- Occupation: Singer
- Years active: 1981–present
- Spouse: Stella Masloumidi (m. 1983)
- Children: Prodromos, Olga Masloumidi

Antypas (Greek: Αντύπας, pronounced [aˈdipas], real name: Antypas Masloumidis, Greek: Αντύπας Μασλουμίδης; born 6 March 1954) is a Greek laïko singer. He released around 20 full-length albums, mostly on Minos.

A couple of his songs were covered by a Serbian singer Aca Lukas, most notably "Gia ta lefta ta kaneis ola" ("Pesma od bola" in Lukas' version), which became a huge hit.

== Discography ==
- 1982 – Apelpismena S'Agapo
- 1985 – Poleitai Kai To Spiti Mou
- 1986 – Apagoreuetai Na' S'Agapo
- 1986 – Eisai Gynaika Filou
- 1988 – Tha Ntytho Gabros
- 1989 – Eroteuomai
- 1989 – Odigo Kai Se Skeftomai
- 1990 – Oi Megalyteres Epityhies Tou
- 1991 – Kalispera
- 1991 – Timi Mou
- 1992 – Gia Na Min Trelatho
- 1994 – Kala Pou Irthes
- 1995 – Ennoeitai
- 1997 – I Kalyteri Mou Fasi
- 1997 – Kataigida
- 1998 – Oi Nyhtes Tou Trelou
- 1999 – Hazeuo
- 2000 – Kai Pali Kalispera
- 2001 – Antypas 2001
- 2003 – Me Kommeni Tin Anasa
- 2005 – Opala
- 2006 – Ena Klik Ki Ola Allazoun
- 2006 – Tou Horismou I Ora
- 2007 – Doro Tin Kardia Mou

=== Digital single ===
- 2012 – Prepei Na Timorithei
- 2012 – Ores Ores
- 2013 – Ekei Pou Eisai Imoun
- 2013 – To Erotima Einai
- 2013 – Fotia
- 2014 – Trauma Diamberes
- 2014 – Valte Kati Na Pio
- 2014 – Mou Aresei
- 2015 – Den To Kana
- 2016 – Ena Agkathino Stefani
- 2016 – To Methisi
- 2017 – Tha Kaneis Maura Matia
- 2017 – Ellinika Milao
- 2020 – Gia Na Pairneis Tetoia Ora
- 2022 – Min Akous Kanena
