= Giorgos Papadakis =

Greek television presenter (1951–2026)

Giorgos Papadakis (Greek: Γιώργος Παπαδάκης; 4 February 1951 – 4 January 2026) was a Greek journalist and television presenter.

== Life and career ==
Papadakis was born in Chalandri on 4 February 1951. In the 1980s he worked at ERT, initially on the radio of the Second Program, presenting the morning show "Every day everywhere" and then on ERT television the midday show "Three on the air" in the period 1986–1988, as a co-presenter with Semina Digeni, Nasos Athanasiou and Giannis Dimaras. In the period 1988-1989 he presented the show "Together and today" on ET1.

From 1992 to 2025, Papadakis presented the first chronologically and longest-running morning news show on Greek television, "Good Morning Greece". In 2011, the show was renamed "Morning ANT1" until 7 September 2015, when the original title was restored, at his request which was accepted by the channel. He left his presentation on 4 July 2025, in an atmosphere of emotion with all the contributors on the small screen.

Papadakis died from a heart attack on 4 January 2026, at the age of 74.
