= Sto Para Pente =

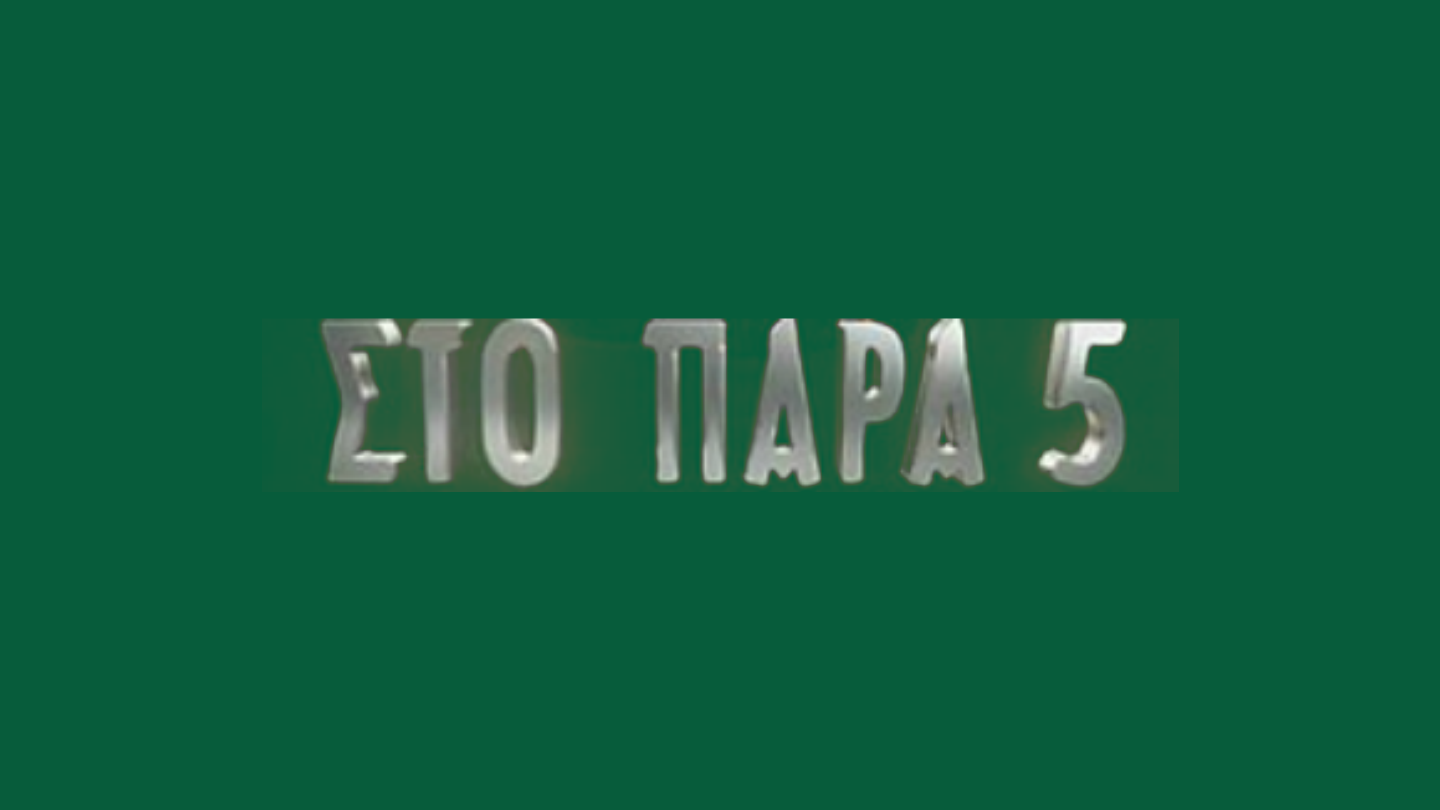
- Promotional photograph
- Also known as: In the Nick of Time
- Στο παρά 5
- Genre: Comedy; Drama; Mystery; Adventure
- Created by: Giorgos Kapoutzidis
- Written by: Giorgos Kapoutzidis
- Directed by: Antonis Aggelopoulos
- Starring: Giorgos Kapoutzidis; Smaragda Karydi; Elissavet Konstantinidou; Argiris Aggelou; Aggeliki Lampri
- Voices of: Zeta Makripoulia
- Opening theme: Imoun Aggelos tou Charlie by Danae Favilli
- Ending theme: multiple songs
- Country of origin: Greece
- Original language: Greek
- No. of seasons: 2
- No. of episodes: 49

Production
- Production locations: Athens, Greece
- Running time: 42-45 minutes

Original release
- Network: Mega Channel
- Release: September 26, 2005 – June 18, 2007

Sto Para Pente (Greek: Στο παρά 5; English: In the Nick of Time) is a popular Greek comedy-drama television series which was broadcast on Mega Channel for two seasons, from September 25, 2005 until June 18, 2007.

The script was written by Giorgos Kapoutzidis, who had also written the successful Greek TV series, Savvatogenimenes, that aired on that same network for the 2003-2004 season. The director was Antonis Aggelopoulos. Being an instant critical and popular success, Sto Para Pente was the biggest television hit of both the 2005-2006 and the 2006-2007 seasons and is regarded as one of the most famed and successful shows in Greek television history. The series was originally supposed to include only one season (26 episodes, each lasting approximately 45 minutes) but its immense popularity resulted to a second season consisting of 23 more episodes. The first episode of Season 2 aired on October 2, 2006. Despite early, widespread calls for the creation of a third season, Kapoutzidis made it clear that the second would be the last season of the show. The highly anticipated series finale attracted an audience of nearly 3 million viewers (a rating of 66.0%), making this 70-minute-long special episode the third most watched episode of any television series ever in Greece since ratings began. "Sto Para Pente" also met great success abroad within Greek diaspora communities.

The plot revolved around five seemingly unrelated people who happened to be present at the death of a former minister in a malfunctioning elevator of a luxurious hotel in central Athens. The dying minister begged them with his final words to find out who did this to him by researching a forgotten crime that took place decades before in Thessaloniki. The five characters soon discovered that the minister was actually poisoned. Without a clue on what course of action to follow, they decide to team up, which leads them to a long series of incredible adventures. What they were unaware of at the beginning, however, was that they were actually dealing with some of the most powerful criminals in Greece. What is more, after an alarming number of coincidences made them realize that nothing had happened as randomly as it seemed to in the beginning.

== Title ==
The title literally translates to "at five [minutes] to", a Greek expression that means "In the nick of time". It serves as a pun, referencing the five protagonists, as well as the fact that they manage to escape from their predicaments at the very last moments.

The number five gains further significance later in the show, as it revealed that the main antagonists are a team of five villains, each positioned within one of the five powers: a politician (legislative power), a senior police officer (executive power), a lawyer whose father is a judge (judicial power), a journalist (Fourth Estate) and an ordinary citizen (the people). In the final episode of the series (season 2, episode 23), it is revealed that the group of five was intentionally put together by their guardian angel Amalia, who was herself part of a group of five friends.

== Season 1 (2005–2006) summary ==
Thirty years before the events of the series take place, a mysterious group (which is later revealed to include five men of whom the four went on to become wealthy and powerful) murdered a young woman after raping her. The murderers managed to get away with it by manipulating events so that a scapegoat was imprisoned instead. They went on to eliminate anyone who tried to uncover the truth. One of these people include former Minister Evaggelos Stavrianidis, who is eventually murdered after attending a reception at a luxurious hotel in central Athens. The goal was to murder Stavrianidis by a slow-acting poison, the effects of which resemble those of a heart attack so that Stavrianidis would die alone in his house. This plan is foiled when Stavrianidis dies inside the broken-down elevator of the hotel, with five unrelated people bearing witness to his final moments, in which he tells them he was murdered and that the police can't be trusted.

The five soon get to know each other and decide to go after the people who murdered Stavrianidis. After rescuing Stavrianidis' secretary from the enemies, they find about a known female fashionist that is in contract with the murderers. After trying to learn more by contracting the woman, they are lured and trapped by the man in black and his henchman, who capture the five and tie them up in a totally abandoned place, setting a time bomb to explode in an hour and to eventually kill them. Although about a quarter before the bomb explodes, they are rescued by Amalia, Theopoula and Sofia (Spyros' grandma), who appear there randomly and unexpectedly. When they are free, they continue their searches to extract justice. What brings them together, is that they have all lost someone very close to them in the past, and believe that bringing justice to this other murder will help avenge their loved ones' deaths. They soon find out that all their loved ones died in the same airplane disaster 14 years ago (December 2, 1991), which makes their connection even stronger.

Later on, the five discover that the late Minister was, in his youth, the prosecutor in the trial of the man falsely accused of the young woman's murder. After the man's conviction, Stavrianidis came to realize the prisoner's innocence and set out to undo his false judgment. Not being able to expose the crime to the authorities (30 years had since passed and thus the statute of limitations had run out), Stavrianidis attempted to capture the real culprits by exposing an economic scandal regarding an off-shore company that the murderers used for money laundering.

The five continue their investigations, which lead them to a man named Konstantinos Kastelis, who tells them that he killed the young woman (in the second season it was revealed that Kastelis, along with other four men, attacked and killed her in 1975). The five realize that the man sent in prison was innocent. The leader of the enemies, realizing that now the five know who killed the young woman, murders Kastelis with a silenced 9mm. He also murders a woman that witnessed the event in Kastelis' house.

The leader of the criminals, who seems to be a powerful and influential figure, finds out about the five. Though he does not know their identities or motives, he feels he is in danger of being exposed. Even more frustrated, however, is the leader's chief henchman, who is determined to eliminate them, and who is simply known as "the bad guy" or "the guy in black" by the five. The five always manage to escape his traps in the nick of time (a reference to the show's title) in ways he never seems able to predict.

The first episode begins with the five tied to the railroad tracks trying to escape just as soon as a train comes hurling down the tracks and towards them. They are saved "at the nick of time" by the mysterious and beautiful Amalia, who has pulled the passengers emergency train brake, thinking that her luggage has just fallen out of the window. Just after the opening credits in this episode, the story begins and viewers are informed that the whole story takes place 12 months before the train scene.

At the end of the first season, the five discover the scapegoat named Gerasimos Venetopoulos, the man that was put in jail for the murder of the young woman. He now is free, and lives in a village near Lamia. They go there to learn more information from him, although the man in black and his assistant follow them in a pearl Ford Mondeo. When the five arrive in the village, Fotis goes inside Venetopoulos' house, but before he learns more, the man in black shoots and kills Venetopoulos in front of the eyes of Fotis. After this, the whole team except Spyros start running to escape. When Spyros arrives, he and the whole team get captured by the enemies, who tie them up to the railroad tracks, and the whole train scene from the first episode is repeated, and finally Amalia rescues them. When they are free, it is revealed that the mysterious leader of the bad guys is revealed to the viewers (but not the characters) to be the leader of a major (fictional) political party that has narrowly won the parliamentary elections, making him the new prime minister of Greece. During the whole season his face was never shown on camera and viewers knew him only by his raspy, menacing voice.

The last episode was shown at June 5, 2006, and was viewed by the 58% of the Greek viewers.

== Season 2 (2006–2007) summary ==
The five move from clue to clue, with the men in black constantly on their heels. A fact-finding trip to Mykonos directs them to a reporter that covered the murder case and had expressed his doubts about the court's ruling. Unfortunately, the men in black have him abducted and an impostor lures the five into a trap. Three of them are captured and while the other two manage to rescue their friends by offering to trade the bad guy's assistant, who they had accidentally captured themselves. The journalist goes into hiding, but not before divulging to them the identity of one of the five murderers: a media mogul in charge of Greece's largest media network, Dimosthenis Politis. More evidence lead to the mastermind behind the entire case: the new prime minister of Greece, Aris Pavrinos. After the five finally confront Politis and more overwhelming evidence comes to light (from Politis' father), Politis dies of a heart attack in Dahlia's hotel suite.

As the five try to find clues that will reveal the identity of the remaining two murderers, they get help from an old familiar face, who tells them that the person they are looking for is one of Athens' most powerful lawyers, Yiannis Delikaris. They get Aggela to pose as a law graduate looking for work experience, in order to get access to Delikaris's office. However, Delikaris, knows their identities and intentions and sets his own trap. Spyros' instinct makes him realize that the five are in danger and convinces the others to confront Delikaris. They follow him from his house, but unfortunately suffer a car accident while on a high speed pursuit of Delikaris, that results in all of them being in a coma. In the meantime, Delikaris with help from Pavrinos, manages to escape to South America. It was never revealed as to where he had escaped to.

The five, while in a coma, have a near-death experience in which they visit a place between Heaven and Earth and see some of their dead loved ones. Zoumboulia's husband, Aggela's father, Fotis' mother and Spyros' parents are there and give them some insight on why they were brought together. Dahlia is the only one not to have a loved one there and to be ignored by the people on the 'other side'.

When the five come out of the coma, they do not remember the near-death experience. Their relatives decide to split them up in order to keep them safe and out of trouble, hoping that after a while the situation will cool off and they will give up on their investigations. Eventually they are allowed to go and see a movie together, but while there they bump into Delikaris's secretary who reveals to them the name of the fifth murderer. He is called Dimitris or Takis for short. She also provides them with another clue: the murdered girl from Thessaloniki had a sister who currently lives in Athens.

The five decide that in order to proceed in their investigations they need to somehow eliminate the man in black and his friend/assistant. They decide to put secret camera's in his house. To manage this, they come up with an ingenious plan devised by Fotis with the help of Sophia and Theopoula. At the same time, secretly from Dahlia, Alexis reveals to Aggela, Zoumboulia, Fotis and Spyros, that Dahlia's late father, Velissarios Hatzialexandrou, was behind the plane crash that killed their loved ones and that he also orchestrated several other similar plane crashes with the view to acquire the airline companies involved at rock bottom prices. Alexis swears Dahlia's friends to secrecy since he believes that this revelation will crush her. Although at first the 4 seem unable to handle such a revelation, awkwardly pushing clueless Dahlia away, in the end they realize that their friendship is the most important thing and that Dahlia's dismissal of the value of money is proof that nothing can come between them. After reuniting, they finally visit the murder victim's sister (Katerina Limnioti) who entrusts them with a copy of her murdered brother's archive, which was the same as Stavrianidis' archive, but she and her husband (Christos Limniotis) seem to ignore the existence of any person called "Dimitris/Takis" who should have known Eleftheria (the murdered girl) and should have been the fifth member of the murderers group. The name "Takis" is a diminutive of either Greek name "Dimitris" or "Christos". The protagonists, helped by the secretary of Yiannis Delikaris, thought that "Takis" was coming from "Dimitris" ignoring the chance of mistake. In the meantime, the "chief" bad guy (who is the country's prime minister) finds out everything about the identities of the members, excluding Dahlia, and uses scare tactics to throw them off the case. While threatening Spyro's family over the phone, Dahlia speaks up, informing the prime minister that she is part of the case, and that she can do more harm to him with her power than he can to her friends. The five decide that Dahlia confront him in person, which is something that will have a detrimental effect on him. Pavrinos commits suicide when at the same time the man in black finds the five and is prepared to kill them, the police arrives and arrests both him and his assistant.

== The finale ==
In the 70 minute series finale, the five, having eliminated their strongest enemy, put together the final missing pieces of the puzzle by discovering the identity of the fifth murderer, who turns out to be the murder victim's brother in-law. Although they are now ready to reveal everything to the public and gain all the fame and recognition entailed, after Dahlia voices refusal to gain fame again, they finally decide that it is their "journey", their experiences and their friendship that counts the most and that anything beyond that is useless. Thus, they leave all the joy of being in the spotlight to Fotis' vain cousin Frida who, after revealing all the information about the murders and the economic scandals, becomes a celebrity overnight, rocketing "teleBOAS" ratings from 0.03% to 96%. The rest of the finale deals with the personal lives of the five heroes, focusing on the "goodbyes" each of them had to say. These scenes were filled with bittersweet and rather sentimental moments which were received with controversial reactions by the viewers, who were used to the light-hearted comedy style of the series (which, however, was not being dramatic and sentimental for the first time, as it had also had other dramatic scenes throughout its previous 48 episodes)

The biggest revelation of the finale was the explanation of the role and history of Amalia's character. Although the viewers had long suspected "what" she was, as it was frequently hinted, especially during the second season, it was only in the finale that a full explanation of her story was given. Being the narrator of the whole series, Amalia (who suspiciously used a funny rural accent when interacting with the heroes of the story, but dropped the accent when narrating) had stated on the very first episode of the series "...As for who I am, let's say it is too soon to find out". After that she kept appearing in the role of the "deus ex machina" whenever the five heroes were in serious trouble. Although her interventions at the most crucial moments and her subsequent disappearance after the end of each adventure were obviously suspicious, the heroes never seemed to wonder why this was happening and who she really was. As the series progressed, it became more and more conspicuous that she was related to something supernatural. This was confirmed in the series finale, when it was revealed that Amalia was actually a stewardess on the same plane as the relatives of the five heroes, and she was now an angel, sent to help the five to restore justice, but also (and maybe most importantly) to form a group of close friends, similar to her own group of friends, whom she had to leave behind when she died.

== Cast and characters ==
- The "Five":
  - Smaragda Karydi as Dahlia Hatzialexandrou: one of the wealthiest people in the world. She lived in seclusion for years and found close friendship with the other four. In the airplane accident, she lost her love interest and chauffeur Mr. Stergiou.
  - Elissavet Konstantinidou as Zoumboulia Abatzidou: A widow who came to live in Athens to care for her infant grandson and to live with her co-mother-in-law Marlene Dorkofiki. In the aeroplane accident, she lost her husband Charalabos Abatzidis.
  - Giorgos Kapoutzidis as Spyros Deloglou: A withdrawn young man, studying accounting during the first season, who lives with his grandmother a boring life albeit for his grandmother and her friend leading a hyperactive life, which he finds exhausting. In the aeroplane accident, he lost his parents Eustratios and Dimitra Deloglou.
  - Argiris Aggelou as Fotis Voulinos: A young boy who often comes at odds with his cousin, who is constantly trying to build a career despite her lacking the talent. They work together on the same TV network owned by Fotis' father. In the aeroplane accident, he lost his mother and two-year-old sister.
  - Aggeliki Labri as Aggela Ioakimidou. There aren't any exact details for Aggela's family except for the fact that at some point in her teens she misbehaved and did something that made her relatives to consider enrolling her in some sort of behaviour-correcting institution. Once she overheard that she left home to live on her own by the time she was 14 years old, constantly changing jobs and locations. Her father was in the plane during the accident.
- Other main characters:
- Zeta Makripoulia as Amalia Antonopoulou (and narrator). The stewardess killed in the plane accident along with the entire crew and passengers including the relatives of Zoumboulia, Spyros, Fotis and Angela and Dahlia's lover. It is implied during the last episode that she also lost some sort of relative since there was a passenger who had the same surname as she had. After that, she became Spyros' (and the rest of the gang) guardian angel and helps them to find the murderers. She appears as the granddaughter of an old woman, the neighbour of Spyros. Before her death, she was a married woman and member of another gang of five. Finally, after the death of Spyros' grandmother Sophia she reveals who she is and leaves them forever.
- Irene Koumarianou as Sophia Baxevani, Spyros' grandmother (deceased). Spyros' grandmother. She brought Spyros up after the death of his parents. Spyros takes to care of her and never leaves her alone. Her best friend is Theopoula and with her she often follows the five without their knowledge, helping them when able. She died after the end of the adventures and like Amalia, she became a guardian angel.
- Efi Papatheodorou as Theopoula Tzini ("genie"), Sophia's neighbour and best friend
- Michalis Marinos as Alexis Stergiou, Dahlia's financial adviser
- Popi Christodoulou as Martha and Ritsa, Dahlia's twin maidservants
- Pavlos Orkopoulos as Thomas Voulinos, Fotis' father and owner of TeleBOAS
- Melina Kyriakopoulou as Frida Papaparaskeva, Fotis' cousin and TeleBOAS news anchor, reporter, singer, dancer, writer, director, producer etc.
- Eleni Krita as Marilena ("Marinella") Dorkofiki, Zoumboulia's co-mother-in-law
- Dimitris Petropoulos as Aris Pavrinos (anonymous "chief bad guy" during the first season, later revealed to be the Prime Minister) (deceased)
- Gerasimos Michelis as Andreas Kalogirou, ("the man in black" an agent that was part of many criminal activities, often used as a hit man/assassin. He undertook the case of finding and silencing anyone who's still searching for the case, hired by Aris Pavrinos.)
- Patrikios Kosti as Nikos Kalathas ("the tall guy" friend (and often partner in the business) of Kalogirou.)
- Secondary characters":
- Katerina Theochari as Garoufalia ("the short one") Tzini, Theopoula's daughter-in-law
- Iosif Iosifidis as Avraam Letzos (1st season)
- Petroula Hristou as Anna Ampatzidou, Zoumboulia's daughter, a physician
- Thanasis Tsekouras as Vasilis Tzinis, Theopoula's son
- Anestis Katountis as police officer Anastasios Tzoumanis
- Guest appearances:
- Alkis Panagiotidis as former minister Evagelos Stavrianidis (episodes 1-2) (deceased)
- Valia Yannarou as Elena (episodes 2-5)
- Thodoris Anthopoulos as Timos (episodes 1, 5-7)
- Isidoros Stamoulis as Lefteris (episodes 6,7)
- Sofia Vogiatzaki as Zanna Ioannou (episodes 8-11)
- Antonis Karustinos as "bad guy #3" (episodes 18-20) (deceased)
- Anastasis Kolovos as Argyris (episodes 18-20) (deceased)
- Marianna Loukaki as Dina (episodes 15-17, 33)
- Antonis Babounis as Konstantinos Kastelis (episodes 21-22) (deceased)
- Vicky Vanita as Fotini Koutsioumari (episodes 21-22) (deceased)
- Giorgos Kimoulis as Gerasimos Venetopoulos (episode 26) (deceased)
- Mimi Denissi as herself (episode 34)
- Nikos Nikolaou as Dimosthenis Politis (episodes 31-35) (deceased)
- Vagelis Ploios as Aristidis Politis (episodes 34-35) (deceased)
- Nikos Arvanitis as Giannis Delikaris (episodes 40-42)
- Lina Eksarxou as Elli (episodes 41-43)
- Stratis Ampanoudis as Isidoros Drougos (episodes 39, 47, 49)
- Niki Hatzidou as Katerina Aslanoglou-Limnioti (episodes 45, 47-49)
- Giorgos Kotanidis as Hristos Limniotis (episodes 48, 49)
- Vaso Goulielmaki as Zoe Papadogianni (episode 49)
- Panos Hatzikoutselis as Ralph "Postlethwaite-or-something" (episode 49)
- Mania Bousboura journalist (various episodes)
- Liana Kaneli as herself (episode 49)

== The "Five" Characters ==
Midway through the first season, it becomes apparent that the five have all lost loved ones on the same fatal plane crash. This brings the revelation that the five may be tied together by a higher force trying to make things right. They were also together in an old newspaper photograph at the airport after the tragedy.

=== Dahlia Hatzialexandrou ===
(Smaragda Karidi): The heiress of an immense fortune, she lost her chauffeur and lover in the plane crash. She is one of the richest women in the world, if not the richest. This resulted in her suffering from depression and she ended up living for many years in her opulent, isolated mansion in Ekali, one of Athens' wealthiest suburbs, watching telenovelas and soap operas all day long. Her long-time isolation has cut her off the outside world and has rendered her totally incapable of comprehending basic aspects of everyday life (such as colloquial expressions, or the mere value of money). Having disappeared for two decades (as she was a young adult at the time of the crash), her face and status remained incognito from the media and the public. She carries huge amounts of large-denomination Euro banknotes in her purse, to which she dismissingly refers as the purple ones (€500), the yellow ones (€200) or, rarely, the green ones (€100), and attempts to use them to buy chewing gum, dog food or cookies, with little success since she is unacquainted with the concept of change. The positive aspect of this is that she thinks of the "five's" mission as a fun game, rather than a very dangerous affair that could cost them their lives. Her lover's son, Alexis, is secretly in love with her. He is her personal financial adviser, and successfully manages the vast inheritance that Dahlia would otherwise be unable to manage herself.

=== Zoumboulia "Zoumbi" Abatzidou ===
(Elissavet Konstantinidou): Coming from a village in Northern Greece, the widow Zoumboulia lost her husband, Charalambos, in the crash. Her physician daughter married the son of a wealthy and snobby Athenian, Marilena Dorkofiki (Zoumboulia cannot pronounce her name correctly; she calls her "Marinella" after the famous Greek singer) and Zoumboulia moved to Athens to take care of her baby grandson, since her daughter and son in-law have temporarily moved to Boston. She often gets into serious confrontations with Marilena, who feels anything but delighted with Zoumboulia's presence. Her weird name is a cause of many misunderstandings and makes other people call her simply "Lia" or "Zoumbie". When in danger, she often resorts to religion and when agitated, she emits a high-pitched "iiiii" sound, slaps her lap and sometimes faints. She tends to drift off in long, nostalgic tales about her life in the village and the rural habits of her many friends there, who always have outlandish, descriptive nicknames (Maria the mad, John the lame, Fotini the shoemaker's daughter, etc.). Like Dahlia's, Zoumboulia's name comes from a flower, zoumbouli being a colloquial name for the hyacinth.

=== Spyros Deloglou ===
(Giorgos Kapoutzidis): A geeky university student with no social life. He lost his parents Eustathios and Dimitra in the plane disaster and lives with his grandmother Sophia. Sophia has become best friends with Theopoula, their wacky and extremely weird neighbor. Theopoula and Sophia share the same passion for adventure and new experiences (including learning to play the drums and wanting to take part in a bungee jumping contest). All this madness drives the already neurotic Spyros almost crazy. Spyros is confirmed to be the first and only canonically asexual character to ever appear in Greek TV.

=== Fotis Voulinos ===
(Argyris Aggelou): An aspiring journalist at TeleBOAS, a two-bit TV station (a parody of real Greek local TV channels) owned by his father, Thomas. He lost his mother Alexandra and baby sister Kyriaki in the plane crash and along with his longtime rival, his conceited cousin Frida, presents pretty much all of the channel's pathetic shows. He styles himself as the MacGyver of the group. He has a distinctive hairstyle similar to that of Tintin and tends to engage in imaginary detective work that usually bears little relationship with reality.

=== Angeliki "Aggela" Ioakeimidou ===
(Aggeliki Labri): A brash tomboy who lost her father Apostolos in the plane crash, Aggela came to Athens in search of a job and an independent life far from her native countryside. She is the boldest of the five and carries a major chip on her shoulder. She has a kind heart, but her attitude and tendency to speak her mind has a side-effect: she can never keep friends or jobs for long and usually her first day on a job is also her last. When not hunting down bad guys (her favorite activity), she brings out her artistic nature by working part-time acting at a downtown theater, with controversial results.

== Other significant characters ==
- Sophia (Irene Koumarianou): Spyros' grandmother, a septuagenarian with a vitality, open-mindedness and intellectual curiosity that belies her age. She has lovingly brought up her grandson after his parents were killed, and now that he is an adult, she is determined to live all the life experiences that were denied to her before. She dies peacefully at the end, and Spyros finds out that she had been suffering from leukemia, but had been hiding it from everyone.
- Theopoula (Efi Papatheodorou): Grandma Sophia's neighbor and closest friend. Apparently suffering from senility due to multiple strokes, she has flashes of astounding insight and lucidity and is willing to follow Sophia in learning French, going to evening school, vacationing in Paris and Mykonos, befriend transvestites and flirt with young, attractive men. She hates her daughter-in-law for being short and dreams of getting rid of her so that her son can finally marry a tall woman.
- Amalia (Zeta Makripoulia): The angelic, seemingly dumb blonde who often knows far too much for her apparent naivety and is capable of superhuman feats that appear to be inexplicable. She sports a heavy provincial accent that contrasts with her beautiful, model-like appearance. The startling truth about her identity is revealed in the series finale.
- Marilena (Eleni Krita): A rich, snobbish woman of aristocratic descent, who had been married eight times previously and spends her days playing cards, meditating, discussing fashion and interior decoration, and gossiping with her equally snobbish friends. When her son and his wife, Zoumboulia's daughter, move to Boston on business for a while, Zoumboulia moves into her house to help take care of their baby grandson. Predictably, Zoumboulia's no-nonsense country manners and speech clash with Marilena's haughty big-city ways. Unwilling to become a full-time grandmother herself, Marilena has to accommodate Zoumboulia for the duration. Over time their mutual antipathy turns to fondness and finally, although their children divorce amicably, they decide that they are best friends and decide to live close by and take part in their grandson's upbringing.
- Andreas Kalogirou: a dangerous man and assassin hired by the main villain of the series to kill several people who stand on his way. He was the one responsible for the poisoning of Stavrianidis which kickstarted the events of the series and he has attempted to murder the five protagonists several times with no success. Little is known about Andreas outside of his association with Pavrinos. The main five mostly refer to him as "the man in black" even after they learn his identity. He is usually followed by his friend and partner in crime Nikos Kalathas. Throughout the series Andreas seems to be afraid of Pavrinos who lashes out at him in anger whenever something doesn't go according to plan or the five heroes uncover any more clues against him. In the finale he is on the phone with Pavrinos when the latter commits suicide and then gets arrested and sent to prison for his multiple crimes.

== Style of the series ==
The series is based on a "punchline quotes" structure. While the main plot is unveiled, the characters tend to say funny and original quotes, each one characterizing their personality. At the beginning, the series was mostly comedic in mood but in the latter episodes it became increasingly dramatic, adventurous and suspenseful. Most episodes ended in dramatic cliffhangers. Some have characterised some of the show's punchlines during dramatic and suspenseful parts as dark comedy.

It was the first Greek series in history to present characteristics of cult television shows: A fanbase of youngsters and adults alike have created fan sites and forums discussing the punchlines, mysteries and plot twists of the show.

== Awards and nominations ==
At the Greek television awards "Prosopa" (Faces) for seasons 2005-2006 and 2006-2007 the show was nominated for 30 categories and received 14 awards (being the highest award-winning series in Greek television ever).

Awards
Favourite Comedy series 2006
Favourite Comedy series (Sotiris Moustakas award) 2007
Best Comedy series 2006
Best Comedy series 2007
Best Direction (Antonis Aggelopoulos) 2007
Best original screenplay for a comedy series (Giorgos Kapoutzidis)2006
Best original screenplay for a comedy series (Giorgos Kapoutzidis) 2007
Best Leading Actress (Smaragda Karidi)2006
Best Leading Actress (Smaragda Karidi)2007
Best Supporting Actress (Efi Papatheodorou)2006
Best Supporting Actress (Efi Papatheodorou) 2007
Favourite Actor (Giorgos Kapoutzidis) 2006
Favourite Actress (Smaragda Karidi) 2006
Favourite Actress (Smaragda Karidi) 2007

Nominations
Best direction (Antonis Aggelopoulos) 2006
Best Leading Actor (Giorgos Kapoutzidis) 2006 and 2007
Best Production (Studio ATA) 2006 and 2007
Best Leading Actress (Elisavet Konstandinidou) 2006 and 2007
Best Supporting Actress (Zeta Makripoulia)2006
Best Supporting Actress (Irini Koumarianou) 2007
Best Supporting Actor (Michalis Marinos) 2007
Favourite Actress (Elisavet Konstandinidou) 2006 and 2007
Favourite Actor (Giorgos Kapoutzidis) 2007
Best Editing (Giorgos Zarras) 2006
Best Costume Design (Maria Tsamoudaki) 2006 and 2007

== Soundtrack ==
The opening credits song "Imoun Aggelos tou Charlie" ("I was one of Charlie's Angels") was originally written in the early 80's by Dimitris Iatropoulos and Renato Favilli, and was performed by Danae Favilli. After the show's success, it became a hit and was re-released as a soundtrack. An English language version of the song ("My Uncle's name was Charlie") played only once in the opening credits of the first episode of season 2.

== Commercials ==
The characters of the show appeared in many commercials, most popular those of TIM and Carrefour. The five appeared in two major TIM commercials. The two grandmothers Theopoula and Sofia appeared in a couple of Carrefour commercials as well as Smaragda Karidi's character Dahlia along with her twin maidservants Martha and Ritsa (whose aprons have their names stamped on, so that Dahlia can tell them apart). Karidi also appeared in a few Hellenic Seaways spots as herself, although there are references to her popular character Dahlia.
