= Eleonora Meleti =

Greek journalist

Eleonora Meleti MEP
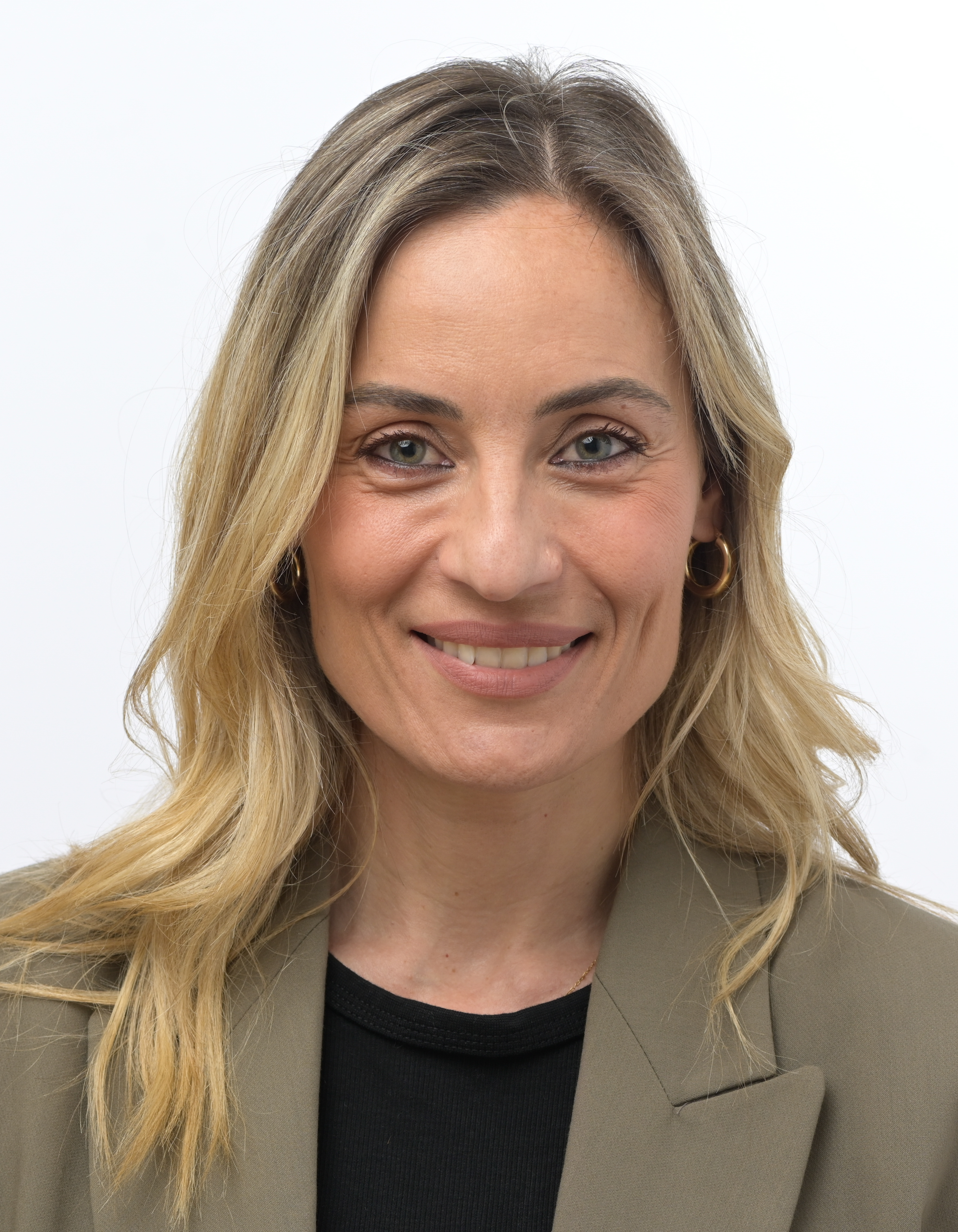

Member of the European Parliament
- Incumbent
- Assumed office 16 July 2024
- Constituency: Greece

Personal details
- Born: 17 September 1978 (age 47) Athens, Greece
- Party: New Democracy
- Spouse: Thodoris Marossoulis (m. 2017)
- Children: 1
- Occupation: Politician

Eleonora Meleti (Greek: Ελεονώρα Μελέτη, born 17 September 1978) is a Greek journalist and politician who has served as a Member of the European Parliament for the New Democracy party since the 2024 European Parliament election.
