= Proino ANT1 =

- Genre: breakfast show
- Presented by: Yiorgos Papadakis
- Country of origin: Greece
- Original language: Greek
- No. of seasons: 4

Production
- Running time: 3 hours

Original release
- Network: ANT1
- Release: 17 October 2011 – July 2015

Related
- Kalimera Ellada

Proino ANT1 (Greek: Πρωινό ΑΝΤ1; English: ANT1 Morning) is a television morning program aired on ANT1 from 17 October 2011 every Monday to Friday from 7am to 10am, It was hosted by Yiorgos Papadakis.

== See also ==
- List of programs broadcast by ANT1
