= Markos Seferlis =

Greek actor and television personality

- Μάρκος Σεφερλής
- Born: September 8, 1968 (age 58); Corinth, Greece
- Education: Mary Vogiatzi-Traga Drama School
- Occupations: Comedian, actor, director, screenwriter and television presenter
- Years active: 1989–present
- Spouse(s): Elsa Michalakopoulou (1996–2003); Elena Tsavalia (2009–present)
- Children: 1
- Parent(s): Sotiris & Charikleia Seferli
- Relatives: Markos & Dimitris &Fotini (siblings)

Markos Seferlis (born September 8, 1968) is a Greek comedian, actor, director, screenwriter and television presenter. He has worked in television, theatre, cinema, but mainly in acting.

== Biography ==
He was born on September 8, 1968, in Corinth, originally from Palaiokastro, Arcadia. His parents are Chariklia and Sotiris Seferlis (?-2004).named after his older brother Markos who was killed in an accident at the age of three. He also has a brother, Dimitris, and a sister, Fotini. After high school, he moved to Athens and studied acting at the Mary Vogiatzi-Traga High School of Dramatic Art, from which he graduated with honors. His first television appearance was in 1988 on ERT2 and he continued with the success of TAXI from 1995 to 1996.

At the same time as television, he also appears in theater. His career in theater began in the winter of 1997–1998, at the Avlea Theater, with the comedy Souita Genethlion and continues to this day with numerous performances, mainly reviews, enjoying a steady and successful career. During his career, he has collaborated with big names such as Thanasis Veggos, Kostas Voutsas, Giorgos Konstantinou, Sotiris Moustakas, Kostas Tsakonas, Stathis Psaltis, etc.

Since 2004, he has been responsible for the entire performance and, in addition to acting, he also takes on the texts, casting, direction and production. In the 2014–2015 season, he presented the morning entertainment show of Mega Channel MEGA Me Mia with his wife Elena Tsavalia. In the winter of 2019, he participated in the troupe of the musical Hairspray at the Acropolis Theater, directed by Themis Marcellou.

From spring 2021 to 2023, he presented the game show 5x5 on the ANT1 television station. He returned to SKAI in 2023, presenting the cooking game show H mama mou mageirevei kalytera apo tin diki sou. In 2025, he said that he had terminated his collaboration with SKAI, and that he was in discussions with another television station.

== Filmography ==
=== Television series ===
- 1989 Stavrosi choris Anastasi
- 1989 To synergeio
- 1990 Aggelos kata lathos
- 1991 Astynomos Thanasis Papathanasis
- 1991 Ta efta kaka tis moiras mou
- 1993 Oi neoellines
- 1995 Sampouan
- 1998 Kata Markon Eva...gelion
- 1999 Prosochi Markopedio
- 2000 The Seferlee show
- 2001 Chtipokardia sto Seferly Hills
- 2002 H salata tou Sef
- 2002 Marko m'ekapses
- 2003 Sovarotis Miden
- 2005 Koritsia o Marcoulis
- 2022 Super Mammy

=== Theater ===
- 1990 Andras, gynaika, diavolos
- 1999 Kai o Simitis thelei ton Germano tou
- 1999 SimiTitanikos
- 1999 Souita Genethlion
- 1999 H Salomi filouse yperocha
- 2000 Mourlenium
- 2000 Yperano pasis apistias
- 2001 Ti vraki tha paradoseis mori?
- 2002 Apata...ton plision sou!!!
- 2002 Kata lathos astynomikos
- 2002 Chapi...end
- 2004 PASOK mou...sorry
- 2004 Ta...lamogia
- 2004 Fame zori
- 2005 Seferlitheite sta gelia
- 2005 Gamos alla...plagia
- 2006 Piretost to savvatovrado
- 2007 299 1/2 "Gelon lave"
- 2008 Mourlen rouge
- 2009 Daddy cool
- 2009 O mpachalogatos
- 2010 O magos tou roz
- 2011 Deipno Hlithion
- 2011 H megali tou geliou scholi
- 2012 Trwei story 30 chronia twra
- 2013 Sti fwlia tou kouklou
- 2013 Souleimark o Megaloprepis
- 2014 Allou Fun Mark
- 2014 Mamma Mia...den yparchei
- 2015 50 Apochroseis to Greece
- 2016 Agapi mono
- 2017 Άλλος για Survivor
- 2017 Black Friday kai 13
- 2018 Greece the Musicult
- 2018 O kalos, o kakos kai o diasimos
- 2019 Ziteitai Sef tis komodias
- 2019 Hairspray
- 2020 Dettolmi kai Goiteia
- 2021 Des ta re ellada ola ayta
- 2022 Praktor 00lefta
- 2023 Me paresyre to revma
- 2023 Akyvernito karavi i patrida mas
- 2024 20 chronia Delfinario
- 2025 Notis i epistrofi
- 2026 Emily in Athens
