= 2 Valid IDs =

2026 political drama film by Ma-an Asuncion-Dagñalan

- Theatrical release poster
- Directed by: Ma-an Asuncion-Dagñalan
- Written by: Abet Pagdagdagan Raz
- Produced by: Ma-an Asuncion-Dagñalan; Geo Lomuntad
- Starring: Marietta Subong; Joey Marquez; Meryll Soriano; Zaijian Jaranilla
- Cinematography: Neil Daza
- Edited by: Vanessa U. De Leon
- Music by: Jazz Nicolas; Mikey Amistoso
- Production companies: Super! Production; Eyepoppers Multimedia Services; Cloudy Duck Pictures; Aliud Entertainment; CMB Film Services; Be True Entertainment
- Distributed by: Cinemalaya
- Release dates: August 7, 2026 (Cinemalaya); October 14, 2026 (Philippines)
- Running time: 93 minutes
- Country: Philippines
- Language: Filipino
- Box office: ₱100 million

2 Valid IDs is a 2026 Philippine political drama film co-produced and directed by Ma-an Asuncion-Dagñalan from a screenplay by Abet Pagdagdagan Raz. The film stars Marietta "Pokwang" Subong as Sylvia, a provincial farmer who must obtain the two valid IDs needed to claim financial assistance for her hospitalized husband's treatment. The supporting cast includes Joey Marquez, Meryll Soriano, and Zaijian Jaranilla.

A co-production of Super! Productions, Eyepoppers Multimedia Services, Cloudy Duck Pictures, Aliud Entertainment, CMB Film Services, and Be True Entertainment, the film premiered on August 7, 2026, as an official entry to the 22nd Cinemalaya Independent Film Festival, and received a nationwide release on October 14.

== Plot ==
Ma. Sylvia Ramos, (Note: The Ma. in this character's name is an abbreviation of Maria, a common practice for Filipino female personal names. When read, the abbreviation is enunciated in its full form, i.e. "Maria Sylvia Ramos". The given name is Ma. Sylvia, while the surname is Ramos.) a poor Ilocana farmer, moves to Metro Manila with her husband Ramon, who is confined in a poorly equipped public hospital due to severe COPD. Sylvia is aided by Denver, a young man caring for his comatose grandfather who is bedridden beside Ramon. Due to the severity of Ramon's condition, he must be transferred to a private hospital where he would have access to better facilities and get surgery in time.

Ramon's aunt Teresa, an OFW working in New Zealand, sends her over ₱127,000 via a remittance center. She goes to claim the money, only to be told that she must first present two valid IDs. However, the only ID Sylvia has is a PhilHealth ID, which the remittance center rejects under its policy. Supported by her niece Mercy who lives in Metro Manila, Sylvia does all she can to obtain IDs, but loses time due to red tape.

Ramon becomes concerned about his wife's ordeal and suggests that they move back to their home province, but Sylvia refuses to quit. Behind Sylvia's back, Ramon asks Denver to pawn the ring Sylvia gave him. Mercy suggests hiring a fixer who can get Sylvia the IDs for a heavy price, but Ramon warns her not to do anything illegal just to obtain the money.

Soon, Ramon's coughing fits and shortness of breath worsen due to hospital-acquired pneumonia, forcing Sylvia to accept the fixer's services. As his condition deteriorates, a depressed Ramon contemplates suicide, prompting Sylvia to break down and finally open up to him about the burdens she has been carrying. After Denver's grandfather dies, Denver secretly returns Ramon's ring to Sylvia, revealing that he had hesitated to pawn it and instead gave a portion of his allowances to Ramon, pretending it was the loaned amount. Ramon spends his birthday in the hospital with Sylvia, Mercy, and her son. Sylvia and Ramon reconcile, and Sylvia promises to Ramon they'll go home the next day after she gets the money.

Now ready with her two new IDs, Sylvia returns to the remittance center. There, she appears to have received a disturbing message on her phone, but the battery dies before she can call back. Desperate, Sylvia asks the teller to let her cut in line on humanitarian grounds and causes a scene when her request is denied. She rushes back to the hospital with the remittance money, only to find that Ramon has died of illness.

Devastated, Sylvia goes to the cashier to pay Ramon's hospital bills, only to encounter another bureaucratic obstacle: the "Maria" in her full given name is abbreviated as "Ma." on her IDs but is spelled out in full in her marriage certificate. An outraged Sylvia grabs her documents from the counter before the film cuts to black.

In a mid-credits scene, hospital staff transfer Ramon's body into a van as Sylvia climbs in. She sits beside her husband's corpse, crying in grief, as the van leaves the hospital.

== Cast ==
=== Main ===
- Marietta "Pokwang" Subong as Sylvia (full name: Ma. Sylvia L. Ramos), a 59-year-old Ilocana farmer struggling to obtain the two valid IDs required to obtain the money sent by a relative for her husband Ramon's medical treatment
- Joey Marquez as Ramon, Sylvia's husband who is suffering from COPD and is confined at a poorly-equipped hospital
- Meryll Soriano as Mercy, Sylvia's niece who lives in Metro Manila
- Zaijian Jaranilla as Denver, a young man whose grandfather is confined at the same hospital as Ramon

=== Supporting ===
- Joem Bascon as Omar, Mercy's husband
- Jun Sabayton as Domeng, the fixer who processed Sylvia's voter's registration for a hefty payment
- Bombi Plata as Nurse Joey
- Nour Hooshmand as a teller at a remittance center
- Maey Bautista as Edna
- Marife Necesito as Norma
- Yian Gabriel as Boyet
- Mike Dagñalan as Gerry
- Chase Salazar as Liza
- Guillermo delos Reyes as Lolo Indo
- Don Melvin Boongaling as Tonyo
- Raphael Balaccua as Nurse Peter
- Angelyn Layno as Dr. Garcia
- Manet Dayrit as a rich woman

== Production ==
=== Development ===
The story originated with screenwriter Abet Pagdagdagan Raz. In an interview with the Philippine Daily Inquirer, Raz revealed he developed the story based on his own experience with excessive bureaucracy when his mother was hospitalized in a private hospital and died of illness, albeit the finished film is set in a government hospital. While processing her death certificate and other papers, he visited the hospital's administrative building, saw how many people were lined up there, and became convinced that many patients are lost less to illness than to the financial strain of their care. Raz also told The Philippine Star that he also drew on what he observed while keeping watch over his mother in the hospital.

Unable to write for a time after his mother's death, Raz joined a workshop at the Movie Workers Welfare Foundation (Mowelfund) to get back to work. He first meant to write about his mother's final days in the hospital, but the premise changed after he came across an online meme joking that one must present two valid IDs in order to get an ID. He asked himself what would happen if the situation were not funny, and the joke were on Filipinos themselves. He completed two scripts at the workshop, one of which was the original script of 2 Valid IDs. However, his application for a Mowelfund grant was unsuccessful.

Raz had worked mostly in television and commercial projects, including romantic comedies, and described 2 Valid IDs as his first overtly political film. Film director Ma-an Asuncion-Dagñalan noted that it was also Raz's first time working in independent cinema. He and Asuncion-Dagñalan met in 2011 while working on the TV5 drama Mga Nagbabagang Bulaklak (2011), and he approached her about directing the project in 2024. Asuncion-Dagñalan, who had won Best Director at the 2022 Cinemalaya festival for Blue Room, said she was drawn to its sociopolitical subject and its female protagonist. After the Mowelfund rejection, the team submitted the project to Cinemalaya, but it did not pass the first round of selection. They pitched it again the following year, and it was chosen for the festival's 22nd edition.

In her director's statement, Asuncion-Dagñalan described the film as more than a story about bureaucracy: a portrait of how poverty, red tape and rigid rules block access to basic needs, and how that pushes people toward fixers, forged identities and moral compromise out of necessity and love rather than selfishness. She told Inquirer that she wanted the film to have a theatrical release and be somewhat more commercial in approach so that it could reach a wider audience, and told The Philippine Star that she hoped it would reach policymakers as well as moviegoers.

=== Casting ===
Marietta "Pokwang" Subong was announced as the lead in July 2026, with the cast including Joey Marquez, Meryll Soriano and Zaijian Jaranilla. The film marked her first Cinemalaya project since Mercury Is Mine (2016). She told Vogue Philippines that she agreed as soon as she learned it was a Cinemalaya film and had read the screenplay.

Subong is known for her performances in comedy, using her screen name "Pokwang." However, for 2 Valid IDs, she is credited under her real name, which she said signals the seriousness of the role. She had previously done the same for Oda sa Wala (2018). She reportedly worked with Asuncion-Dagñalan to change the nuances of her performance so that her comedic persona would not come through.

The principal cast took part in a workshop before filming, which Subong described as emotionally intense. Subong added that she drew on her own experience of lining up for government assistance in the 1990s while her young son was gravely ill.

=== Filming and post-production ===
The cinematographer is Neil Daza, the editor is Vanessa Ubas-De Leon, the production designer is Mao Fadul, and the score is by Mikey Amistoso and Jazz Nicolas. By the first week of July 2026 the film was in color grading at Barebones Inc. in Quezon City. A preview in Inquirer noted that the filmmakers had room to push the material toward satire but chose to keep it serious, and that the film opens with an ambitious long take. The cast has said that some humor remains, intended not as a distraction but as a reflection of how Filipinos use laughter to cope. Subong added that the film does not single out any particular agency and simply reflects everyday experience.

== Release ==
=== Marketing ===
Promotion began in early July 2026, when Cinemalaya published the film's page and Sparkle and GMA News announced Subong's participation. The trailer debuted that month; Vogue Philippines reported that it drew laughter at the Cinemalaya 22 press conference, not because it was comedic but because the situation is familiar. On July 12, Subong thanked viewers after the trailer reportedly passed 10 million views across social media platforms. The cast held a press conference at 901 Studios in Greenhills, San Juan City. Subong and Soriano also discussed the film on GMA's Fast Talk with Boy Abunda, in an episode that aired on July 21.

=== Festival run ===
2 Valid IDs was selected as an official full-length entry to the 22nd Cinemalaya Philippine Independent Film Festival, held August 6–18, 2026. It was released on August 7 at Shangri-La Plaza, the festival's main venue, with additional screenings at Gateway Cineplex 18 and selected Ayala Malls Cinemas. Screenings were reported to have sold out in Metro Manila, in some cases days ahead of the premiere. During the festival's pre-opening press conference, Subong said the film reflects the everyday struggles of many Filipinos, particularly over government processes and securing documents. She also spoke of her own long struggle to obtain a proper identification card.

=== Theatrical release ===
Viewers outside Metro Manila, some as far away as Zamboanga, asked where they could see the film after the festival. By September 24, 2026, a nationwide opening on October 14 had been announced. At a press conference in early October, Subong said the release was due to public demand and that international screenings would follow. The film opened nationwide as scheduled on October 14. The Inquirer later reported that the film was aiming for its international debut at the Hawaii International Film Festival.

== Reception ==
=== Box office ===
The film was one of the three biggest earners at the 2026 Cinemalaya, alongside Status: Rejected and Mag-iina; the festival as a whole recorded a record gross of ₱18 million. In its nationwide run from October 14, unofficial estimates reported by the Inquirer put its earnings at ₱15 million and at the top of the box office, with students and families among the audience.

=== Critical response ===
Reviews were largely positive, with critics most often praising Subong's performance and the film's credible, relatable depiction of bureaucratic frustration. Mel Wang of Rolling Stone Philippines called the film a "bureaucratic nightmare" that viewers will recognize, said Subong brought humanity to what might otherwise have been a tedious ordeal, and credited Marquez's restraint and the supporting characters with grounding the story. Stephanie Mayo of the Daily Tribune gave it four out of five stars, finding it depressing because its reality is so convincing, and said it makes the audience share the protagonist Sylvia's anxious waiting. Merumo Ito of Sinegang.ph gave it five stars, writing that the film locates the horror of inequality in a policy that not everyone can afford in money, time and dignity. Panos Kotzathanasis of Asian Movie Pulse called it "an excellent social drama," praising Subong's gradually fraying composure, Soriano's scene-stealing turn and Daza's unembellished cinematography. Eric Cabahug of The POST compared the film with Last Supper No. 3, the 2009 Cinemalaya Best Film, as another procedural about how the bureaucracy fails the poor; he found 2 Valid IDs the more emotionally powerful of the two, because it shows an upright woman being pushed toward street-level corruption. Rafael Bautista of MEGA wrote that the plot is predictable in its familiarity but still compelling, and praised the opening long take.

Some reviewers had reservations. Mayo thought the hospital's nurses, doctor and patients were too uniformly kind, which slightly undercut the realism, and that the ending might feel like overkill even though it completes the film's argument. Paul Emmanuel Enicola of The Movie Buff wrote that the film works better as an act of recognition than as a fully satisfying drama. He felt Sylvia's ordeal circled rather than progressed and that the closing stretch added one more institutional indignity instead of doing something new with the anger the film had built, though he praised Subong and the supporting cast's performance.

=== Audience response and impact ===
The film won the festival's Audience Choice Award. In a commentary on the festival, the Daily Tribune described the audience reaction as one of recognition, with laughter at Sylvia's predicament turning to indignation because the experience is so familiar. At the gala screening, Subong thanked viewers for the positive reviews and said she hoped the film would help change the system for ordinary people.

The film also drew public discussion before its release. Vogue Philippines reported that it prompted the Philippine Postal Corporation (PHLPost) to clarify that no valid ID is required to apply for a postal ID. Raz said he hoped lawmakers and government officials would watch the film and act on its subject, while Asuncion-Dagñalan said she hoped policymakers would recognize how widely marginalized Filipinos experience these problems, and that information about IDs could be centralized and better communicated to rural communities.

=== Accolades ===
Award-giving organization	Date of ceremony	Category	Recipient(s)	Result	Ref.
22nd Cinemalaya Independent Film Festival	August 17, 2026	Best Actress	Marietta Subong	Won (Note: Tied with Ruby Ruiz.)	
22nd Cinemalaya Independent Film Festival	August 17, 2026	Special Jury Award (Full-length Film Category)	2 Valid IDs by Ma-an Asuncion-Dagñalan and Abet Pagdagdagan Raz	Won	
22nd Cinemalaya Independent Film Festival	August 17, 2026	Audience Choice Award (Full-length Film Category)	2 Valid IDs by Ma-an Asuncion-Dagñalan and Abet Pagdagdagan Raz	Won	
