= 49th Gawad Urian Awards =

Award ceremony for Philippine films of 2024

- Date: October 8, 2026
- Site: Teresa Yuchengco Auditorium at the De La Salle University, Manila, Philippines

Highlights
- Best Picture: Bloom Where You Are Planted
- Most awards: Bloom Where You Are Planted Quezon (4)
- Most nominations: Quezon (10)

The 49th Gawad Urian Awards (Filipino: Ika-49 na Gawad Urian) celebrates the best of Filipino cinema in 2025. Established in 1976, the Gawad Urian Awards highlights the best of Philippine cinema as decided by the Filipino Film Critics. The awards are organized and handled by the Film Development Council of the Philippines (Manunuri ng Pelikulang Pilipino).

On September 1, 2026, the nominations were announced on the organization's official Facebook page. Leading the pack with ten nominations is Jerrold Tarog's biographical film, Quezon, chronicling the political rise of former Philippine President Manuel L. Quezon.

The ceremony is held on October 8, 2026 at the Teresa Yuchengco Auditorium at the De La Salle University in Manila, Philippines. Two films bag four wins apiece, the most for the night: Quezon and the Best Picture winner, Bloom Where You Are Planted. For the first time in Gawad Urian history, both the Best Actor and Best Actress categories end in ties. Furthermore, Jennica Garcia wins Best Supporting Actress, fourteen years after her mother, Jean Garcia, received the same award in 2012 for Ang Sayaw ng Dalawang Kaliwang Paa, marking the first mother-daughter duo to win Urian awards.

== Winners and nominees ==
Winners are listed first and bolded.

Best Picture Pinakamahusay na Pelikula	Best Director Pinakamahusay na Direksyon
**Bloom Where You Are Planted – Alex Poblete, Taripnong Cagayan Valley**; Bar Boys: After School – 901 Studios; Cinemartyrs – Kino Arts; Quezon – TBA Studios; Sunshine – ANIMA, Cloud Duck Pictures, Happy Infinite Productions, Project 8 Projects	**Noni Abao – Bloom Where You Are Planted**; Antoinette Jadaone – Sunshine; Jerrold Tarog – Quezon; Kip Oebanda – Bar Boys: After School; Sari Dalena – Cinemartyrs
Best Actor Pinakamahusay na Pangunahing Aktor	Best Actress Pinakamahusay na Pangunahing Aktres
**Carlo Aquino – Bar Boys: After School (tie)**; **Jericho Rosales – Quezon (tie)**; Earl Jonathan Amaba – ImPerfect; Elijah Canlas – Rumaragasa; Jojit Lorenzo – Habang Nilalamon ng Hydra ang Kasaysayan; Jomari Angeles – Some Nights I Feel Like Walking; Julian Paul Larroder – Tigkiliwi; Miguel Odron – Some Nights I Feel Like Walking	**Maris Racal – Sunshine (tie)**; **Odette Khan – Bar Boys: After School (tie)**; Ann Krystel Go – ImPerfect; EJ Jallorina – Dreamboi; Geraldine Villamil – Republika ng Pipolipinas; Nour Hooshmand – Cinemartyrs; Rissey Reyes-Robinson – Paglilitis; Ruby Ruiz – Tigkiliwi
Best Supporting Actor Pinakamahusay na Pangalawang Aktor	Best Supporting Actress Pinakamahusay na Pangalawang Aktres
**Will Ashley – Bar Boys: After School**; Amado Arjay Babon – Magellan; Enrique Gil – Manila's Finest; Iain Glen – Quezon; Joshua Garcia – Meet, Greet, & Bye; Nanding Josef – Habang Nilalamon ng Hydra ang Kasaysayan; Rico Blanco – Manila's Finest	**Jennica Garcia – Sunshine**; Alessandra de Rossi – Republika ng Pipolipinas; Dolly de Leon – Habang Nilalamon ng Hydra ang Kasaysayan; Elora Españo – Lakambini: Gregoria de Jesus; Eula Valdez – Paglilitis; Gina Pareño – Lakambini: Gregoria de Jesus; Rochelle Pangilinan-Solinap – Child No. 82: Anak ni Boy Kana
Best Screenplay Pinakamahusay na Dulang Pampelikula	Best Cinematography Pinakamahusay na Sinematograpiya
**Republika ng Pipolipinas – Renei Dimla**; Bar Boys: After School – Kip Oebanda, Zig Dulay & Carlo Catu; Cinemartyrs – Sari Dalena & Keith Sicat; Quezon – Jerrold Tarog & Rody Vera; Sunshine – ANIMA, Cloud Duck Pictures, Happy Infinite Productions, Project 8 Projects	**Quezon – Pong Ignacio**; Cinemartyrs – Neil Daza & Kiri Dalena; Magellan – Lav Diaz & Artur Tort; Manila's Finest – Raymond Red; Rumaragasa – Theo Lozada; Salum – TM Malones; Sunshine – Pao Orendain
Best Production Design Pinakamahusay na Disenyong Pamproduksyon	Best Editing Pinakamahusay na Editing
**Quezon – Monica Sebial**; Cinemartyrs – Toym Imao; Magellan – Lav Diaz; Manila's Finest – Digo Ricio; Salum – Kyle Fermindoza	**Bloom Where You Are Planted – Che Tagyamon**; Bar Boys: After School – Chuck Gutierrez; Child No. 82: Anak ni Boy Kana – Vanessa Ubas De Leon; Cinemartyrs – Keith Sicat; Quezon – Jerrold Tarog; Sunshine – Ben Tolentino
Best Music Pinakamahusay na Musika	Best Sound Pinakamahusay na Tunog
**Quezon – Jerrold Tarog**; Bloom Where You Are Planted – Glenn Barit; Habang Nilalamon ng Hydra ang Kasaysayan – Paulo Protacio; Manila's Finest – Emerzon Texon & Fred Sandoval; Song of the Fireflies – Krina Cayabyab	**Cinemartyrs – Emilio Bien Sparks**; Bloom Where You Are Planted – Mikko Quizon & John Michael Perez; Child No. 82: Anak ni Boy Kana – Alex Tomboc; Quezon – Immanuel Verona & Fatima Nerikka Salim; Rumaragasa – Lamberto Casas; Sunshine – Vincent Villa
Best Short Film	Best Documentary
**Cemento – Justine Borlagdan**; Agapito – 901 Studios; City's Laundry and Taxes – Earvic Noay/V Films, Mi Casa Pelikula; Coding si Papa – Miko Biong; Hasang – Skim Guevarra; Muli Ka Na, Merlie – Higante Media, TheIdeaFirst Company, iNDIEGENIUS, RSVP Film Studios, FilmPost Studios; RUNO! – Geo Lomuntad, Carl Joseph Papa, Rebekah Sarabosing; Vox Humana – Hannah Schierbeek, Alemberg Ang; When It Rained Malunggay Leaves – Tarzeer Pictures, Black Cap Pictures, Ten17P; Yelo – Miles Jewel Santos/Bukaka Dekwatro	**Bloom Where You Are Planted – Alex Poblete, Taripnong Cagayan Valley**; Del Mundo – Yellowkite Film Productions, StudioIndio; Food Delivery: Fresh from the West Philippine Sea – Voyage Studios, Narra Studios, CMB Film Services, ang Bagong Siklab Productions; Lakambini: Gregoria de Jesus – Pelikulove, Giya Studios; Romeo and Julie – DAGHILI PICTURES; The Road to Sydney – Wanderlustproject Films, OneUp Film Studios

== Special Award ==
=== Natatanging Gawad Urian ===
- Laurice Guillen

== Multiple nominations and awards ==
Films that received multiple nominations
Nominations	Films
10	Quezon
8	Cinematryrs
8	Sunshine
7	Bar Boys: After School
6	Bloom Where You Are Planted
5	Manila's Finest
4	Habang Nilalamon ng Hydra ang Kasaysayan
3	Child No. 82: Anak ni Boy Kana
3	Lakambini: Gregoria de Jesus
3	Magellan
3	Republika ng Pipolipinas
3	Rumaragasa
2	ImPerfect
2	Paglilitis
2	Salum
2	Some Nights I Feel Like Walking
2	Tigkiliwi

Films that won multiple awards
Awards	Film
4	Bloom Where You Are Planted
4	Quezon
3	Bar Boys: After School
2	Sunshine
