= The Levant (poem) =

1990 epic poem by the Romanian writer Mircea Cărtărescu

- Author: Mircea Cărtărescu
- Original title: Levantul
- Language: Romanian
- Publisher: Cartea Românească
- Publication date: 1990
- Publication place: Romania
- Pages: 223
- ISBN: 973-23-0236-4

The Levant (Romanian: Levantul) is a 1990 epic poem by the Romanian writer Mircea Cărtărescu. Consisting of twelve cantos in verse, the narrative begins in the early 19th century, and follows a band of Wallachian adventurers and pirates, who return to their native land in an attempt to overthrow an oppressor. Cărtărescu uses the poem to highlight oriental influences in Romanian culture.

== See also ==
- 1990 in poetry
- Romanian literature
