= Martin del Rosario =

Filipino actor (born 1992)

- Born: Martin Miguel Mangay del Rosario; November 25, 1992 (age 33); Manila, Philippines
- Education: University of the Philippines Diliman (BA)
- Occupations: Actor; model
- Years active: 2007–present
- Agent(s): ABS-CBN (2007–2013); Star Magic (2007–2013); ALV Talent Circuit (2013–present); GMA Artist Center (2014–present); GMA Network (2014–present); TV5 (2024–present)
- Height: 1.75 m (5 ft 9 in)
- Relatives: Ces Quesada (aunt); Connie Sison (aunt)

Martin Miguel Mangay del Rosario (born November 25, 1992) is a Filipino actor and model who is known for his portrayal of Norberto Matias in the 2011 drama series Minsan Lang Kita Iibigin, as Severino Monzon in the TV adaptation of Pintada in 2012, as Nico in the 2016 film Ang Manananggal sa Unit 23B, and as Prince Zardoz in Voltes V: Legacy.

Del Rosario received his first award as an actor in 2011, for the Breakthrough Performance by An Actor category, by the Entertainment Press Society for his role as Jun in the film Dagim. He was also awarded, the same year, as the New Movie Actor of the Year by the Philippine Movie Press Club. In 2015, he won as Best Supporting Actor at the Gawad Urian Awards for his role as Gab in the 2014 Cinemalaya film, Dagitab.

On September 2, 2014, after six years of being a talent of ABS-CBN under Star Magic, del Rosario signed an exclusive contract with GMA Network. Prior to this, del Rosario was already seen in most of GMA Network shows such as Rhodora X and Magpakailanman.

== Early and personal life ==
Del Rosario was born on November 25, 1992, to Robert del Rosario, a landscape artist who had a small stint in show business in his early years, and Maria Teresa "Tet" Mangay, a company executive and the sister of character actress Ces Quesada. He finished his high school studies as salutatorian in Lourdes School of Quezon City. He took up BA Broadcast Communication at the University of the Philippines Diliman, and was a member of the Upsilon Sigma Phi fraternity.

He is the middle child of three siblings with Kim being the eldest and Denise being the youngest. He is a nephew of broadcast journalist Connie Sison.

== Career ==
=== Early years ===
Del Rosario was in his second year high school when he was spotted by talent scout Jun Reyes, who was in a cab, in front of Lourdes School in 2007. He was on his way La Loma to buy lechon for Gerald Anderson's birthday party when Del Rosario caught his attention. Reyes left him a calling card and asked for his phone number. Del Rosario gave Reyes his mom's phone number. He then went to ABS-CBN for acting workshops.

=== 2007–2013 ===
His first television role was playing Ray Avellino in Star Magic Presents: Abt Ur Luv. He also played the younger brother of Roxanne Guinoo in Sineserye Presents: Natutulog Ba ang Diyos? in the same year.

When Star Magic Presents: Abt Ur Luv Ur Lyf 2 ended in 2008, he appeared in another two seasons of Star Magic Presents namely: Astigs in Haay...skul lyf and Astigs in Luvin' Lyf. He appeared in three episodes of Maalaala Mo Kaya in 2008. He also landed a supporting role in ABS-CBN's prime time drama Iisa Pa Lamang.

In 2009, he played a molested teenager in the "Boarding House" episode of Maalaala Mo Kaya. He was cast as Otap, the main antagonist, of Your Song Presents: Boystown. He then went on to appear in two more episodes of Maalaala Mo Kaya in the same year. He also had a special participation in May Bukas Pa and a supporting role in Katorse.

Del Rosario made his film debut in 2010. He had a supporting role in Star Cinema's Till My Heartaches End and a lead role in the indie film Dagim. According to del Rosario, his first film was Dagim but Till My Heartaches End came out in cinemas earlier. In television, he appeared in the afternoon drama series Magkano ang Iyong Dangal? and Juanita Banana. He also portrayed gay roles in the "Headband" episode of Maalaala Mo Kaya and in the horror-fantasy drama TV series Rosalka.

In 2011, Del Rosario made a cameo appearance in the 2010 remake of Mara Clara and was cast as Norberto Matias in Minsan Lang Kita Iibigin. While filming a fight scene in Minsan Lang Kita Iibigin, Del Rosario accidentally shot Andi Eigenmann with a blank bullet. Eigenmann was rushed to the St. Luke's Medical Center in Quezon City. The actress suffered second degree burns. Del Rosario later apologized for the accident. He received his first acting award in the same year. He won "Breakthrough Performance by an Actor" for the film Dagim in the 8th Golden Screen Awards presented by the Entertainment Press Society, Inc. He also won the "New Movie Actor of the Year" award, for the same film, in the 27th PMPC Star Awards for Movies. He played Ulam the brother of Pura, played by Melai Cantiveros, in the film The Adventures of Pureza, directed by Soxie Topacio.

In 2012, he was the lead actor of Precious Hearts Romances Presents: Pintada, together with Denise Laurel. It was directed by Cathy Garcia Molina.

=== 2014–present ===
Del Rosario was first seen on GMA Network as Martin Aquino in the psychological drama series Rhodora X, this is after he was released by his previous network ABS-CBN. On September 2, 2014, along with Camille Prats and Kiko Estrada, Del Rosario officially inked an exclusive contract with GMA Network. In 2015, Del Rosario appeared in afternoon drama series Buena Familia. He had a guest appearance in the primetime series Pari 'Koy as the gay lover of Sam Evangelista, Jr. played by Hiro Peralta and in Beautiful Strangers as Oliver Lacsamana.

In 2016, del Rosario became part of the cast of Dangwa as Miguel in its last two weeks. The same year, he starred as Caloy Manalastas in the political-drama series Naku, Boss Ko! with Ruru Madrid and Gabbi Garcia.

In 2018, he landed a regular role in the GMA's new hit series Hindi Ko Kayang Iwan Ka alongside Mike Tan, Yasmien Kurdi and Jackie Rice.

In 2025, he is set to play a main role in an upcoming film with PinoyFlix titled Beyond The Call of Duty.

== Filmography ==
=== Film ===
Year	Title	Role	Notes	Ref.
2010	Dagim	Jun		
2010	Till My Heartaches End	Wally		
2011	The Adventures of Pureza: Queen of the Riles	Ulysses "Ulam" Buraot		
2011	Won't Last a Day Without You	Duke		
2012	The Healing	Jed		
2012	Amorosa: The Revenge	Amiel dela Cruz		
2014	Bride for Rent	Mik Antonio		
2014	Marka	Billy Boy Santiago		
2014	Dagitab	Gab		
2014	SAGWAN: Paddle	Emilio	Short film	
2015	Homeless			
2016	Ang Manananggal sa Unit 23B	Nico		
2018	Born Beautiful	Bobby "Barbs" Cordero		
2019	The Panti Sisters	Daniel Panti		
2020	U-Turn	Eric Suarez		
2021	Big Night!	Doctor	Cameo	
2023	Voltes V: Legacy – The Cinematic Experience	Zardoz		
2025	Flower Girl	Robert		
2025	Beyond the Call of Duty	Ricky Mapa		
2025	Haplos sa Hangin	Emman		
2025	KMJS' Gabi ng Lagim: The Movie	Fr. Rex	Segment: "Sanib"	
2026	Tayo Lang Ang Nakakaalam	Neil	22nd Cinemalaya Independent Film Festival entry	
2026	Multwoh †	TBA		
2026	Poon †			

=== Television ===
Year	Title	Role	Notes	Source
2007–2008	Star Magic Presents: Abt Ur Luv: Ur Lyf 2	Ray Avellino		
2008	Sineserye Presents: Natutulog Ba ang Diyos?	Boy Ramirez		
2008	Star Magic Presents: Astigs in Haay...School Lyf	Drex		
2008	Maalaala Mo Kaya	Jay	Episode: "Sanggol"	
2008	Star Magic Presents: Astigs in Luvin' Lyf	Blake		
2008	Maalaala Mo Kaya	Raymond	Episode: "Notebook"	
2008	Iisa Pa Lamang	Eric Suarez	Special participation	
2008	Maalaala Mo Kaya	Dennis	Episode: "Mansyon"	
2009	Maalaala Mo Kaya	Sonny	Episode: "Musiko"	
2009	Your Song Presents: Boystown	Otap		
2009	Maalaala Mo Kaya	Lolong's friend	Episode: "Medal of Valor"	
2009	Maalaala Mo Kaya	Young Richard	Episode: "Boarding House"	
2009	Katorse	Macoy		
2009	May Bukas Pa	Pedring's Apo	Guest appearance	
2010	Maalaala Mo Kaya	Samantha	Episode: "Headband"	
2010	Magkano ang Iyong Dangal?	Biboy		
2010	Rosalka	Young Johnny	Special participation	
2010-2011	Juanita Banana	Chester		
2011	Maalaala Mo Kaya	Jason	Episode: "Bibliya"	
2011	Anino't Panaginip: The Hidden Chapters of Imortal	Superhero	Episode: "Superhero"	
2011	Mara Clara		Cameo, 1 episode	
2011	Minsan Lang Kita Iibigin	Norberto Matias		
2012	Maalaala Mo Kaya	Ben	Episode: "Papag"	
2012	Maalaala Mo Kaya	Jake	Episode: "Baunan"	
2012	E-Boy	Young Gabriel villareal	Special participation	
2012	Wansapanataym	Hele Boy Luzon	Episode: "Maan Antukin"	
2012	Oka2kat	Punong Aba	2 episodes	
2012	Precious Hearts Romances Presents: Pintada	Sev Monzon		
2013	Maalaala Mo Kaya	Kevin Balot	Episode: "Family Picture"	
2013	Juan Dela Cruz	Bagno		
2014	Rhodora X	Martin Aquino	Episode: "Shadow and Enemies"	
2014	Magpakailanman	Lauro Tuaño	Episode: "The Lauro Tuaño Story: Ang Ina na Hindi Malilimutan"	
2014	Wagas	Romano Vasquez	Episode: "The Romano & Alma Love Story: Sumpa Ko"	
2015	Karelasyon	AJ	Episode: "Apartment"	
2015	Wagas	Andy	Episode: "Kulam at Pag-ibig"	
2015	Pari 'Koy	Jeremy		
2015	Wagas	Troy Montez	Episode: "The Mystica & Troy Love Story: Love Knows No Age"	
2015	Magpakailanman	Alex Bernardo	Episode: "The Alex Bernardo Story: Sa Ngalan ng Pagmamahal"	
2015	Karelasyon	Joshua	Episode: "Laro"	
2015	Karelasyon	Ryan	Episode: "My Mother's Lover"	
2015	Buena Familia	Harry Atendido		
2015	Maynila	Marco	Episode: "Sikretong Malupit"	
2015	Magpakailanman	Jesus Parungao	Episode: "The Jesus Boy Parungao Story: Ama Namin"	
2015	Beautiful Strangers	Oliver Lacsamana		
2015	Wagas	Jeland	Episode: "Forget-me-not on Christmas"	
2016	Magpakailanman	Art	Episode: "The Trixie Maristela Story: I'm Dating a Transgender"	
2016	Dangwa	Miguel		
2016	Karelasyon	Miguel	Episode: "Unico Hijo"	
2016	Karelasyon	Ian	Episode: "Rigodon"	
2016	Naku, Boss Ko!	Caloy Manalastas		
2016	Maynila	Dale	Episode: "Liwanag"	
2016	Magpakailanman	Lucky	Episode: "Anak sa Mundo ng Droga"	
2016	Karelasyon	Lester	Episode: "Sapi"	
2017	Pinulot Ka Lang sa Lupa	Kiko		
2017	Karelasyon	Marlon/ Alejandro	Episode: Tukso	
2017	Mulawin vs. Ravena	Aramis		
2017	Stories for the Soul	Alex	Episode: "Sa Ngalan ng Anak"	
2017	Magpakailanman	Noriel	Episode: "Dystonia"	
2018	Hindi Ko Kayang Iwan Ka	Lawrence De Leon		
2018	Daig Kayo ng Lola Ko	Jesus Christ	Episode: May Wish Ang Tatlong Trees	
2019	My Special Tatay	Garry "Gardo" Guzman	Guest	
2019-2020	The Gift	Jared Marcelino		
2019	Imbestigador	Darwin Dormitorio	Episode: Dormitorio	
2020	Magpakailanman	Dexter	Episode: "The Lockdown Wife"	
2021	Imbestigador	Frank Anthony Gregorio	Episode: "Gregorio Double Murder Case"	
2023	Voltes V: Legacy	Prince Zardoz / Manuel Nabuz		
2024	Asawa ng Asawa Ko	Jeffrey "Jeff" Manansala		
2024	Lilet Matias: Attorney-at-Law	Young Ramir Matias		
2024	Magpakailanman	Jimmy Pacheco	Episode: "Hostage in Israel"	
2025	Lolong: Bayani ng Bayan	Ivan Banson	Supporting cast	
2025	Encantadia Chronicles: Sang'gre	Theo	Guest cast	
2026	House of Lies	Edward Torrecampo	Main Cast	

== Accolades ==
Accolades received by Martin del Rosario
Award	Year	Category	Nominated Work	Result	Ref.
Asian Television Awards	2020	Best Leading Male Performance (Digital)	Born Beautiful (The Series)	Won	
Cinemalaya Philippine Independent Film Festival	2026	Best Actor	Tayo Lang Ang Nakakaalam	Won	
Cinemalaya Philippine Independent Film Festival	2026	Best Ensemble Performance	Tayo Lang Ang Nakakaalam	Won (Note: Shared with Miguel Odron, Yayo Aguila, and Jeffrey Quizon.)	
FAMAS Awards	2013	Best Supporting Actor	Amorosa: The Revenge	Nominated	
Gawad Genio Awards	2011	Best Film Debut Performer	Dagim	Won	
Gawad Urian Awards	2015	Best Supporting Actor	Dagitab	Won	
Golden Screen Awards	2011	Breakthrough Performance by An Actor	Dagim	Won	
Pista ng Pelikulang Pilipino	2019	Best Actor	The Panti Sisters	Won	
PMPC Star Awards for Movies	2011	New Movie Actor of the Year	Dagim	Won	
PMPC Star Awards for Television	2010	Best Single Performance by an Actor	Maalaala Mo Kaya: Headband	Nominated	
