= Blinding =

Blinding may refer to:

- Blinding (punishment), a type of physical punishment
- Blinding (cryptography), computing without having input or output
- Blinding (novel), a novel by Mircea Cărtărescu
- The Blinding E.P., by Babyshambles, 2006
- "The Blinding", a song by Jay Electronica from A Written Testimony
- "Blinding", a song by Florence and the Machine from Lungs

== See also ==
- Auto-da-Fé (novel) or Die Blendung, a novel by Elias Canett
- Blind experiment, in which the researcher is not aware of which data points were generated by an intervention
- Blindness
- Flash blindness
