= Mag-iina (The Mothering) =

2026 psychological horror film

- Theatrical release poster
- Directed by: Giancarlo Abrahan
- Written by: Guelan Varela-Luarca
- Based on: Corridors by Guelan Varela-Luarca
- Produced by: Giancarlo Abrahan; Bianx Basilio; Dee Nermal
- Starring: Janine Gutierrez; Lucas Andalio; Cherry Pie Picache; Agot Isidro; Ness Roque; Jackie Lou Blanco
- Cinematography: Joy A. Aquino
- Edited by: Benjamin Tolentino
- Music by: David Yuhico
- Distributed by: Cinemalaya
- Release date: August 2026 (Cinemalaya)
- Running time: 105 minutes
- Country: Philippines
- Language: Filipino

Mag-iina (The Mothering) is a 2026 Philippine psychological horror film.

== Cast ==
- Janine Gutierrez as Angelina "Anj", a woman who was estranged from her own clan, the Abreu family. She lived in New York in the United States for 21 years and returns to her ancestral home in the Philippines after the death of her father. She is a divorcee at 36-years old.
  - Alejandra Cortez as young Anj.
- Lucas Andalio as Yñigo Abreu III, Anj's cousin.
- Cherry Pie Picache as Ysobel, Anj's righteous aunt and mother of Yñigo III.
- Agot Isidro as Mita, Anj's erratic mother.
- Ness Roque as Katte, a stoic but worried maid
- Jackie Lou Blanco as Angela, a 90-year old matriarch. Blanco was 62-years old at the time of premier and wore prosthetics for the role.
- Bart Guingona as Yñigo Abreu, Anj's father.

== Production ==
Mag-iina had Giancarlo Abrahan as its director while Guelan Varela-Luarca did the screenplay. The story for the film was based on a stage play Corridors that has never had a full-stage performance yet.

Corridors which had its story also written by Valera-Luarca had its stage reading in January 2026 by CAST PH. The script for Corridors was made for the partial fulfilment of requirements for Valera-Luarca's fine arts degree in playwright at Hunter College. It is described as "an allegory on Filipino evil".

The duo added scenes not on the original play. The film also had its own ending.

The film revolves around the story of a woman who was estranged from her family returning to her ancestral house on the 40th day after her father's death.

== Awards and recognition ==
Mag-iina garnered various major awards at the 2026 Cinemalaya including Best Film.

| Award-giving organization | Date of ceremony | Category | Recipient(s) | Result | Ref. |
|---|---|---|---|---|---|
| 22nd Cinemalaya Independent Film Festival | August 17, 2026 | Best Film | Mag-iina | Won | |
| 22nd Cinemalaya Independent Film Festival | August 17, 2026 | Best Direction | Giancarlo Abrahan | Won | |
| 22nd Cinemalaya Independent Film Festival | August 17, 2026 | Best Supporting Actor | Lucas Andalio | Won (Note: Tied with KD Omalin of Hand of God.) | |
| 22nd Cinemalaya Independent Film Festival | August 17, 2026 | Best Screenplay | Guelan Varela-Luarca | Won | |
| 22nd Cinemalaya Independent Film Festival | August 17, 2026 | Best Original Music Score | David Yuhico | Won | |
| 22nd Cinemalaya Independent Film Festival | August 17, 2026 | Best Production Design | Katrish Aristoki | Won | |
