= Comedy in the Philippines =

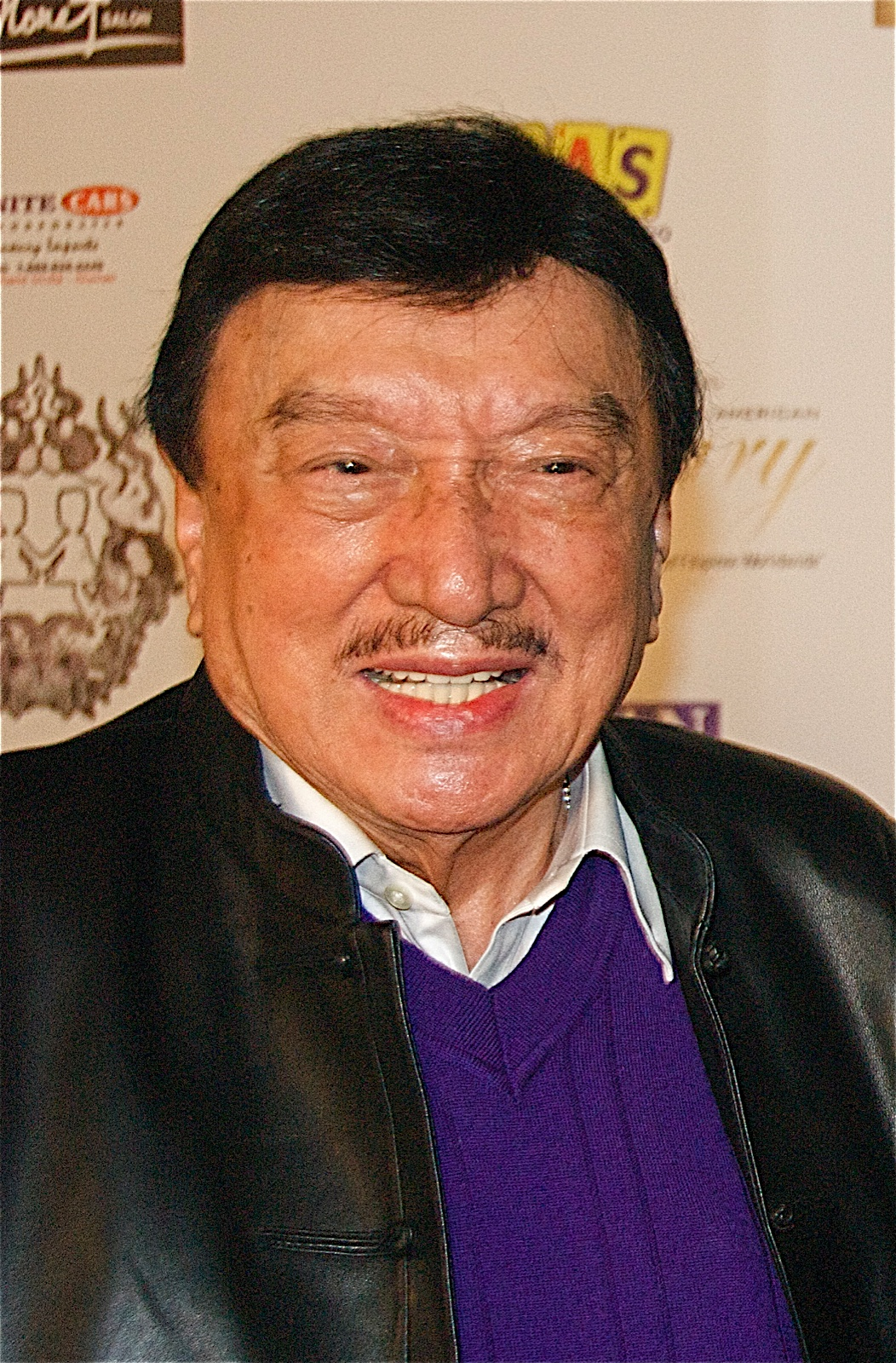
Dolphy, considered by Filipinos as the King of "Pinoy" Comedy

Comedy in the Philippines has had a significant presence in Philippine culture for as long as Filipinos have had mediums of entertainment, and has transformed to reflect changing Filipino life.

Although there are very few contemporaneous descriptions of early Philippine performance arts, the prominent use of humor is evident in documented folkloric forms as the salawikain (proverb), and oral epics such as Biag ni Lam-ang. Oral epics notably contain prominent instances of physical humor, such as the incident of Lam-ang's bath in the Amburayan river.

The colonial era saw the introduction of new forms of entertainment, which included comedic performances in these new formats. The Spanish introduced the comedic anti-Muslim propaganda play called the "Moro-moro" and the tragicomic three-act play known as the Comedia. The American occupation and the industrial age brought new forms such as cinema and the Bodabil show.

Political satire has played an important role in Philippine life, especially during times of repression and censorship, such as the Philippine American War, the Japanese Occupation of the Philippines, and Martial Law under Ferdinand Marcos, when serious dissent was suppressed but comedy was allowed for a greater freedom of expression.

== Early history ==
Japanese merchants travelled to the Philippines to trade and immigrants settled in what is now called the city of Paco, Manila. They entertained Filipinos with a form of comedy, called rakugo, until the Spanish replaced local entertainments with European-style theatres.

When Miguel Lopez de Legazpi and his men colonized the Philippines, a comedy theatre already existed in the form of ethnic rituals of dances and jokes. Local ethnic groups including the Ifugao and Ibaloi created these comedic dances. However, the Spanish outlawed the practices to prevent the rise of anti-Spanish propaganda and revolts. The only record of Filipino ritual comedy is from Legazpi's sailor, "Roque", written in his diary:

Many of the Indians who watch the ritual, laugh so loud that they enjoy and love the ritual so much unlike our European counterpart of ritual. Maybe it's not a ritual, it's a comedy entertainment. Maybe the ancestors of these Indians already know comedy. I ask an Indian but he never understand me, so I went to visit an Indian scholar to know about their language. I study their language for just about ten months. I watch again from the ritual and I was very enjoyed. Their comedy is rare from our style of comedy where jesters went to the stage and make funny jokes about someone who is in the place. And there is strange part in this ritual where an Indian stands himself and tell jokes not about someone like teasing him or her but telling stories. These kind of ritual must be preserved for future generations to come.

— Roque

"Roque" was the first Spaniard to study the Tagalog language but his identity is unclear as records of Legazpi's crew list five sailors named Roque and two with this as their nickname.

Carina Chotirawe traces Pinoy humor to the Filipino peoples' history of colonization, alienation, and tragedy: "Humor and pathos are two sides to the same coin of the human experience, alternating in ways that speak of enduring tragedy and turmoil yet interminable light-heartedness and optimism."

== Comedy during the Spanish colonial era ==
The advent of European colonialism in the Philippines, beginning with the arrival of Ferdinand Magellan in 1521 and the largely successful conquista of Miguel Lopez de Legaspi in 1765 and onwards, brought about the dominance of European modes of entertainment. The most comedic of these forms was the Moro-moro, a form of anti-Muslim propaganda arising from Spain's long history of feud against their Moorish Muslim colonizers in the Iberian peninsula. Another form with significant comedic elements was the tragi-comic Comedia, three-act play combining dramatic and comic elements.

== The advent of "Bodabil" ==
The Spanish–American War and the American colonial period which came about as a result of the 1898 Treaty of Paris brought a new format of comedy to the Philippines as part of variety shows called "Bodabil" – the predecessor of today's Filipino noontime variety shows.

=== "Pistaym" Bodabil ===
American vaudeville acts were originally brought by the Americans to the Philippines to entertain locally stationed American troops. Local performers such as Zarsuelista Atang de la Rama and singer Katy de la Cruz began joining these vaudeville acts in the mid 1910s, and in 1920, a Filipino entertainer named Luis Borromeo (who renamed himself "Borromeo Lou" after a brief stay in North America) organized what became the first Filipino bodabil company. Segments of these variety shows included humorous elements such as the acts of dancer Bayani Casimiro, and the magician and Chaplin imitator Canuplin. Bodabil remained a dominant form of entertainment during the "pistaym" ("Peacetime") years before World War II despite the introduction of cinema.

=== Bodabil during World War II ===
The Japanese invasion of the Philippines in late 1941 led to a halt in film production in the country, at the insistence of the Japanese who were not keen to allow Western influences to persist within the country. Bodabil however was permitted, and it became the predominant form of entertainment in the country. Many film actors whose careers had been stalled became regular performers in bodabil shows.

Among the performers whose careers were jumpstarted during this period were Panchito Alba, Anita Linda, Rosa Mia, the tandem of Pugo and Togo, and Dolphy, who started under the stage name "Golay" as a comic dance partner of Bayani Casimiro.

Many bodabil shows during the war incorporated subtle anti-Japanese and pro-American messages. Pugo and Togo had a popular routine where they portrayed Japanese soldiers wearing multiple wristwatches on both of their arms, and they were soon briefly incarcerated for that spoof. There were comedic and dramatic skits that referred to the impending return of "Mang Arturo", an allusion to General MacArthur's promise, "I shall return." Even guerilla members attended bodabil shows, and when word reached the performers that the Kempetai were due to arrive, they'd break out into a special song that served as code to the guerillas to leave the premises.

== Comedy during the Marcos dictatorship ==
When Ferdinand Marcos announced on September 23, 1972, that he had declared martial law throughout the Philippines, he also ordered the shutdown of media and performance venues. Some radio and television stations were eventually allowed to return to air, but these were mostly stations belonging to cronies of Ferdinand Marcos. Comedic performances soon became one of the few venues through which Ferdinand Marcos, his wife Imelda Marcos, and other key figures could be criticized within the political mainstream. A number of comedians became very popular for this, notably Willie Nepomuceno and Tessie Tomas, who were known for their comedic impersonations of Ferdinand and Imelda Marcos. Nepomuceno would later reveal that he would regularly be approached by generals of the Armed Forces of the Philippines to stop impersonating Marcos "dahil siya ang presidente" (because he's the president) and he is supposed to be treated with respect. Nepumoceno says that he still did the impersonations because he felt that was the only way he was able to serve the country during the dictatorship.

== Comedy in the immediate Post-EDSA era ==
The ouster and eventual exile of Ferdinand Marcos and his family in 1986 led to the reopening of previously-shuttered radio and television stations, allowing comedians to express themselves freely once again. Political satire became a mainstay of Philippine television, with programs such as the Sic O'Clock News taking a satirical look at current events. Satire became a big part of comedy films as well, with films like Juan Tamad at Mister Shooli sa Mongolian Barbecue taking obvious potshots at contemporary issues such as corruption, feudalism, the irrational aspects of Philippines' legislative process, foreign intervention in local politics, and election cheating.

== Contemporary comedy ==
=== Comedy in Philippine New Wave cinema ===
The ready availability of digital cameras in the early 2000s gave birth to a new generation of Philippine movies which have come to be referred to as Philippine New Wave cinema, produced independently from the studios that had dominated the movie industry during much of the 20th century. Comedy was a dominant genre among commercial films of the time, so the early films of the Filipino New Wave tended to be dramas. But as independent producers and directors became more established, Filipino New Wave Comedies began to arise.

Some of the experimental works included metacomedies such as Antoinette Jadaone's Six Degrees of Separation from Lilia Cuntapay and Chris Martinez and Marlon Rivera's Ang Babae Sa Septic Tank, and deadpan mockumentaries such as Mike de Leon's Bayaning Third World. Comedic elements found their way even into documentaries like Ramona S. Diaz' 2003 documentary Imelda, which brought up some of the more absurd character traits of the former First Lady of the Philippines. More successful than these were a new wave of romantic comedies such as J.P. Habac's 2017 film I’m Drunk, I Love You, Dan Villegas' 2014 film English Only, Please and (Antoinette Jadaone's 2014 film That Thing Called Tadhana.

=== Stand-up comedy ===
Stand-up comedy began to grow in the Philippines at the turn of the 21st century.

== Comedy of the Philippine Diaspora ==
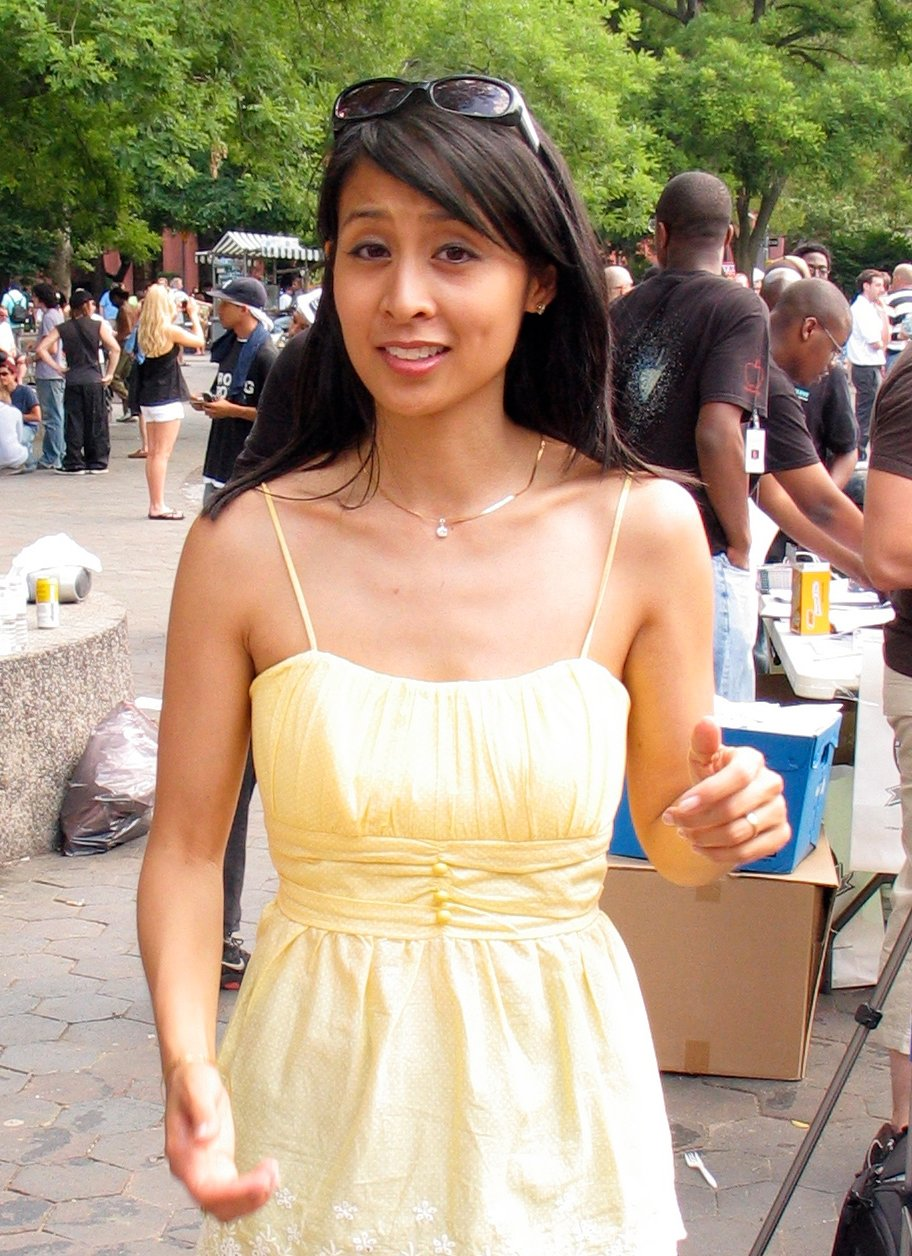
Filipino-American YouTube Comedian Christine "Happy Slip" Gambito at the 777 YouTube gathering in Washington Square Park in Virginia Beach, Virginia.

While emigration from the Philippines started becoming a phenomenon early in the Nation's history, it grew began to grow significantly in light of labor export policies during the Ferdinand Marcos, Corazon Aquino, and Fidel Ramos administrations. As a result, Filipino immigrants have established themselves around the world, with second and even third generations of ethnic Filipinos in many western and middle eastern countries, notably the United States, which has long-held cultural ties with the Philippines. Among these immigrants and their descendants, a new subset of comedians has arisen, reflecting the experiences of the Philippine diaspora.

Among the standup comedians who broke out in the US Comedy scene during the 1990s were stand-up comedians Jo Koy, Rex Navarette and Rob Schneider. The rise of YouTube as an online media platform later saw the rise of YouTube comedians like Mikey Bustos and Christine "Happy Slip" Gambito

Among the most prominent comedy acts of the Philippine diaspora, commonly explored themes include immigrant experiences, especially the humorous interactions of second generation immigrants with their first generation immigrant parents. Another common theme is to poke fun of the racism they observe within Filipino culture, aside from the racism they experience as immigrants.

== Comedic themes ==
The Philippines performing arts have a long history of using comedy to comment on various aspects of Philippine life. Political satire became part of the scene early on, allowing writers to poke fun at Spain and other colonial powers, and later on the Japanese. Poverty has also been a common satirical theme, providing incisive commentary about inequality in Philippine society. Gender and LGBT issues have also been a prominent theme in Philippine comedies, with flamboyant LGBT characters such as Facifica Falayfay becoming a mainstay of commercial Filipino comedies.

Sarcasm and observational comedy is also a recurring theme in Filipino comedy in recent years, with comedians such as Vice Ganda earning a polarizing reputation for their use of mockery and insult comedy directed towards other people.

== Notable Filipino comedians ==
- Ramon Bautista
- Bayani Casimiro
- Ethel Booba
- Lourd de Veyra
- Dolphy
- Eugene Domingo
- Ron Josol
- Christine "Happy Slip" Gambito
- Jo Koy
- Leo Martinez
- Rex Navarette
- Willie Nepomuceno
- Panchito Alba
- Pugo and Togo
- Rene Requiestas
- Tim Tayag
- Tado (comedian)
- Jun Urbano
- Michael V.
- Tito Sotto
- Vic Sotto
- Joey De Leon
- Redford White
- Vice Ganda
- Vhong Navarro
