= Epic poetry =

Lengthy poem dealing with supernatural forces

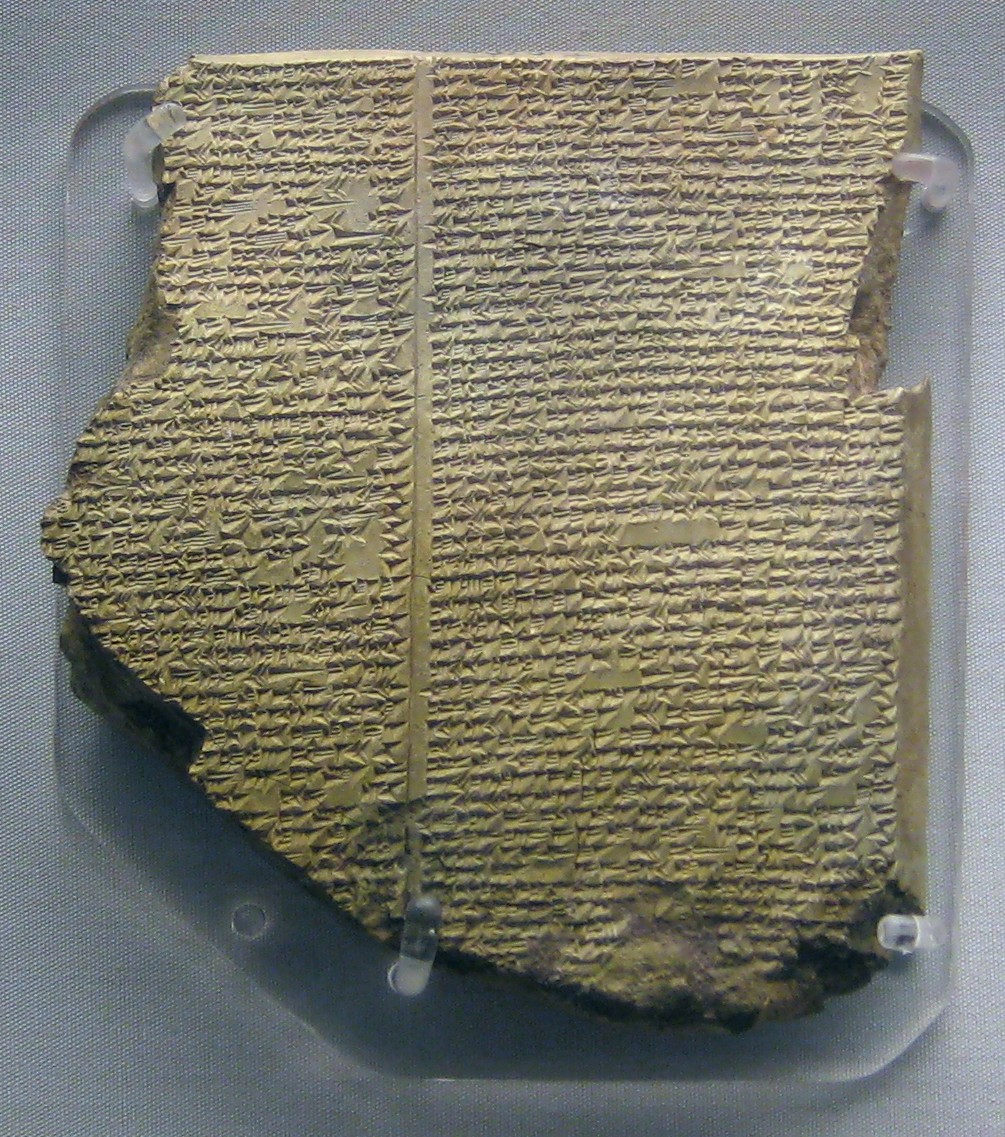
A tablet containing a fragment of the Epic of Gilgamesh

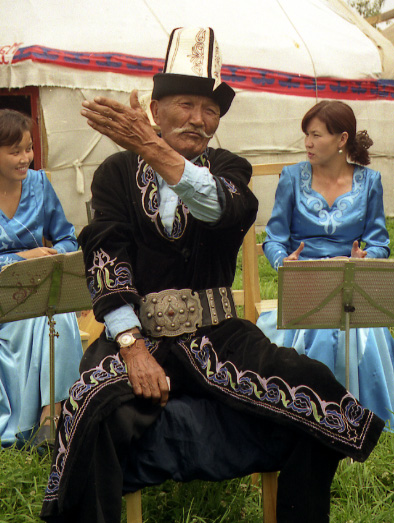
A traditional Kyrgyz manaschi performing part of the epic poem at a yurt camp in Karakol

In poetry, an epic is a lengthy narrative poem typically about the extraordinary deeds of extraordinary characters who, in dealings with gods or other superhuman forces, gave shape to the mortal universe for their descendants. With regard to oral tradition, epic poems consist of formal speech and are usually learnt word for word, contrasted with narratives that consist of everyday speech, categorised into factual or fiction, the former of which is less susceptible to variation.

== Etymology ==
The English word epic comes from Latin epicus, which itself comes from the Ancient Greek adjective epikos (ἐπικός), from epos (ἔπος), 'word, story, poem'.

In Ancient Greek, 'epic' could refer to all poetry in dactylic hexameter (epea), which included not only Homer but also the wisdom poetry of Hesiod, the utterances of the Delphic oracle, and the strange theological verses attributed to Orpheus. Later tradition, however, has restricted the term 'epic' to heroic epic, as described in this article.

== Overview ==
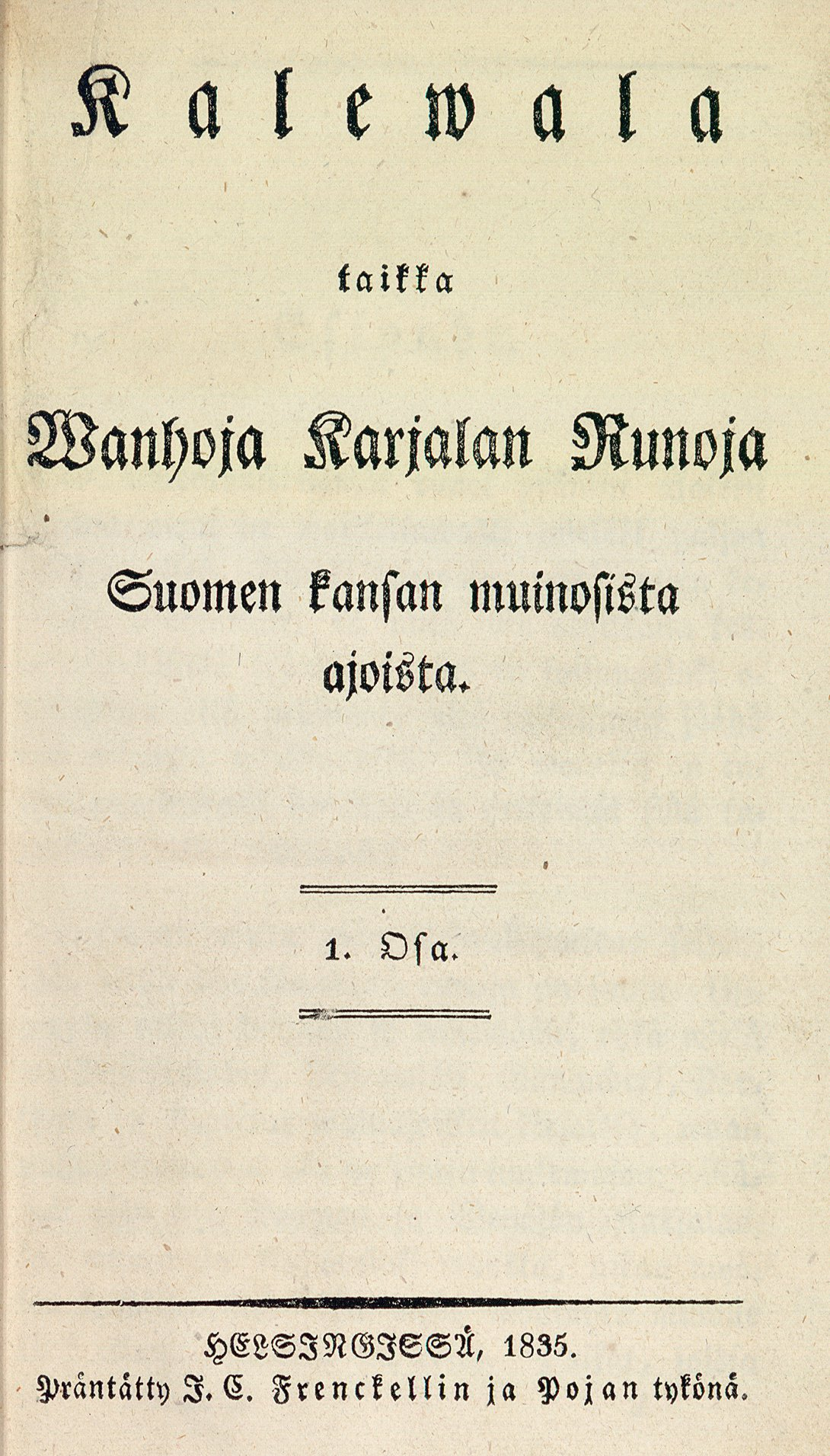
The first edition (1835) of the Finnish national epic poem Kalevala by Elias Lönnrot

Originating before the invention of writing, primary epics, such as those of Homer, were composed by bards who used complex rhetorical and metrical schemes by which they could memorize the epic as received in tradition and add to the epic in their performances. Later writers like Virgil, Apollonius of Rhodes, Dante, Camões, and Milton adopted and adapted Homer's style and subject matter, but used devices available only to those who write.

The oldest epic recognized is the Epic of Gilgamesh (c. 2500–1300 BCE), which was recorded in ancient Sumer during the Neo-Sumerian Empire. The poem details the exploits of Gilgamesh, the king of Uruk. Although recognized as a historical figure, Gilgamesh, as represented in the epic, is a largely legendary or mythical figure.

The longest written epic from antiquity is the ancient Indian Mahabharata (c. 3rd century BC–3rd century AD), which consists of 100,000 ślokas or over 200,000 verse lines (each shloka is a couplet), as well as long prose passages, so that at ~1.8 million words it is roughly twice the length of Shahnameh, four times the length of the Rāmāyaṇa, and roughly ten times the length of the Iliad and the Odyssey combined.

Famous examples of epic poetry include the Sumerian Epic of Gilgamesh, the ancient Indian Mahabharata and Rāmāyaṇa in Sanskrit and Silappatikaram and Manimekalai in Tamil, the Persian Shahnameh, the Ancient Greek Odyssey and Iliad, Virgil's Aeneid, the Old English Beowulf, Dante's Divine Comedy, the Finnish Kalevala, the German Nibelungenlied, the French Song of Roland, the Spanish Cantar de mio Cid, the Portuguese Os Lusíadas, the Armenian Daredevils of Sassoun, the Old East Slavic The Tale of Igor's Campaign, John Milton's Paradise Lost, The Secret History of the Mongols, the Kyrgyz Manas, and the Malian Sundiata. Epic poems of the modern era include Derek Walcott's Omeros, Mircea Cărtărescu's The Levant and Adam Mickiewicz's Pan Tadeusz. Paterson by William Carlos Williams, published in five volumes from 1946 to 1958, was inspired in part by another modern epic, The Cantos by Ezra Pound.

== Oral epics ==
The first epics were products of preliterate societies and oral history poetic traditions. Oral tradition was used alongside written scriptures to communicate and facilitate the spread of culture. In these traditions, poetry is transmitted to the audience and from performer to performer by purely oral means. Early 20th-century study of living oral epic traditions in the Balkans by Milman Parry and Albert Lord demonstrated the paratactic model used for composing these poems. What they demonstrated was that oral epics tend to be constructed in short episodes, each of equal status, interest and importance. This facilitates memorization, as the poet is recalling each episode in turn and using the completed episodes to recreate the entire epic as he performs it. Parry and Lord also contend that the most likely source for written texts of the epics of Homer was dictation from an oral performance.

Milman Parry and Albert Lord have argued that the Homeric epics, the earliest works of Western literature, were fundamentally an oral poetic form. These works form the basis of the epic genre in Western literature. Nearly all of Western epic (including Virgil's Aeneid and Dante's Divine Comedy) self-consciously presents itself as a continuation of the tradition begun by these poems.

== Composition and conventions ==
In his work Poetics, Aristotle defines an epic as one of the forms of poetry, contrasted with lyric poetry and drama (in the form of tragedy and comedy).

Epic poetry agrees with Tragedy in so far as it is an imitation in verse of characters of a higher type. They differ in that Epic poetry admits but one kind of meter and is narrative in form. They differ, again, in their length: for Tragedy endeavors, as far as possible, to confine itself to a single revolution of the sun, or but slightly to exceed this limit, whereas the Epic action has no limits of time. This, then, is a second point of difference; though at first the same freedom was admitted in Tragedy as in Epic poetry.

Of their constituent parts some are common to both, some peculiar to Tragedy: whoever, therefore knows what is good or bad Tragedy, knows also about Epic poetry. All the elements of an Epic poem are found in Tragedy, but the elements of a Tragedy are not all found in the Epic poem.

— Aristotle, Poetics Part V

Harmon & Holman (1999) define an epic:

Epic
A long narrative poem in elevated style presenting characters of high position in adventures forming an organic whole through their relation to a central heroic figure and through their development of episodes important to the history of a nation or race.

— Harmon & Holman (1999)

Harmon and Holman delineate ten main characteristics of an epic:

1. Begins in medias res ("in the thick of things").
2. The setting is vast, covering many nations, the world or the universe.
3. Begins with an invocation to a muse (epic invocation).
4. Begins with a statement of the theme.
5. Includes the use of epithets.
6. Contains long lists, called an epic catalogue.
7. Features long and formal speeches.
8. Shows divine intervention in human affairs.
9. Features heroes that embody the values of the civilization.
10. Often features the tragic hero's descent into the underworld or hell.

The hero generally participates in a cyclical journey or quest, faces adversaries that try to defeat them in their journey, and returns home significantly transformed by their journey. The epic hero illustrates traits, performs deeds, and exemplifies certain morals that are valued by the society the epic originates from. Many epic heroes are recurring characters in the legends of their native cultures.

=== Conventions of the Indian Epic ===
In the Indian mahākāvya epic genre, more emphasis was laid on description than on narration. Indeed, the traditional characteristics of a mahākāvya are listed as: (Note: itihāsa-kath-ôdbhūtam, itarad vā sad-āśrayam, | catur-varga-phal'-āyattaṃ, catur-udātta-nāyakam, nagar'-ârṇava-śaila'-rtu, | udyāna-salila-kṛīḍā-madhu-pāna-rat'-ôtsavaiḥ, vipralambhair vivāhaiś ca, kumār'-ôdaya-varṇanaiḥ, | mantra-dūta-prayāṇ'-āji-nāyak'-âbhyudayair api; alaṃ-kṛtam, a-saṃkṣiptaṃ, rasa-bhāva-nirantaram, | sargair an-ativistīrṇaiḥ, śravya-vṛttaiḥ su-saṃdhibhiḥ, sarvatra bhinna-vṛttāntair upetaṃ, loka-rañjanam | kāvyaṃ kalp'-ântara-sthāyi jāyate sad-alaṃkṛti) (Note: It springs from a historical incident or is otherwise based on some fact; it turns upon the fruition of the fourfold ends and its hero is clever and noble; By descriptions of cities, oceans, mountains, seasons and risings of the moon or the sun; through sportings in garden or water, and festivities of drinking and love; Through sentiments-of-love-in-separation and through marriages, by descriptions of the birth-and-rise of princes, and likewise through state-counsel, embassy, advance, battle, and the hero's triumph; Embellished; not too condensed, and pervaded all through with poetic sentiments and emotions; with cantos none too lengthy and having agreeable metres and well-formed joints, And in each case furnished with an ending in a different metre – such a poem possessing good figures-of-speech wins the people's heart and endures longer than even a kalpa.)

- It must take its subject matter from the epics (Ramayana or Mahabharata), or from history,
- It must help further the four goals of man (purusharthas),
- It must contain descriptions of cities, seas, mountains, moonrise and sunrise, and accounts of merrymaking in gardens, of bathing parties, drinking bouts, and love-making.
- It should tell the sorrow of separated lovers and should describe a wedding and the birth of a son.
- It should describe a king's council, an embassy, the marching forth of an army, a battle, and the victory of a hero.

=== Themes ===
Classical epic poetry recounts a journey, either physical (as typified by Odysseus in the Odyssey) or mental (as typified by Achilles in the Iliad) or both. Epics also tend to highlight cultural norms and to define or call into question cultural values, particularly as they pertain to heroism.

=== Conventions ===
==== Proem ====
In the proem or preface, the poet may begin by invoking a Muse or similar divinity. The poet prays to the Muses to provide them with divine inspiration to tell the story of a great hero.

Example opening lines with invocations:

- Sing goddess the baneful wrath of Achilles son of Peleus
  — Iliad 1.1
- Muse, tell me in verse of the man of many wiles
  — Odyssey 1.1
- From the Heliconian Muses let us begin to sing
  — Hesiod, Theogony 1.1
- Beginning with thee, Oh Phoebus, I will recount the famous deeds of men of old
  — Argonautica 1.1
- Muse, remember to me the causes
  — Aeneid 1.8
- Sing Heav'nly Muse, that on the secret top
  of Oreb, or of Sinai, didst inspire
  — Paradise Lost 1.6–7

An alternative or complementary form of proem, found in Virgil and his imitators, opens with the performative verb "I sing". Examples:

- I sing arms and the man
  — Aeneid 1.1
- I sing pious arms and their captain
  — Gerusalemme liberata 1.1
- I sing ladies, knights, arms, loves, courtesies, audacious deeds
  — Orlando Furioso 1.1–2

This Virgilian epic convention is referenced in Walt Whitman's poem title / opening line "I sing the body electric".

Compare the first six lines of the Kalevala:

Mastered by desire impulsive,
By a mighty inward urging,
I am ready now for singing,
Ready to begin the chanting
Of our nation's ancient folk-song
Handed down from by-gone ages.

These conventions are largely restricted to European classical culture and its imitators. The Epic of Gilgamesh, for example, or the Bhagavata Purana do not contain such elements, nor do early medieval Western epics that are not strongly shaped by the classical traditions, such as the Chanson de Roland or the Poem of the Cid.

==== In medias res ====
Narrative opens "in the middle of things", with the hero at his lowest point. Usually flashbacks show earlier portions of the story. For example, the Iliad does not tell the entire story of the Trojan War, starting with the judgment of Paris, but instead opens abruptly on the rage of Achilles and its immediate causes. So, too, Orlando Furioso is not a complete biography of Roland, but picks up from the plot of Orlando Innamorato, which in turn presupposes a knowledge of the romance and oral traditions.

==== Enumeratio ====
Epic catalogues and genealogies are given, called enumeratio. These long lists of objects, places, and people place the finite action of the epic within a broader, universal context, such as the catalog of ships. Often, the poet is also paying homage to the ancestors of audience members. Examples:

- In The Faerie Queene, the list of trees I.i.8–9. Also the list of personified rivers in IV.xi.20-44 and the list of sea nymphs IV.xi.48-51.
- In Paradise Lost, the list of demons in Book I.
- In the Aeneid, the list of enemies the Trojans find in Etruria (Central Italy) in Book VII. Also, the list of ships in Book X.
- In the Iliad, the Catalogue of Ships, the most famous epic catalogue, and the Trojan Battle Order

==== Stylistic features ====
In the Homeric and post-Homeric tradition, epic style is typically achieved through the use of the following stylistic features:

- Heavy use of repetition or stock phrases: e.g., Homer's "rosy-fingered dawn" and "wine-dark sea".
- Epic similes

=== Form ===
Many verse forms have been used in epic poems through the ages, but each language's literature typically gravitates to one form, or at least to a very limited set.

Ancient Sumerian epic poems did not use any kind of poetic meter and lines did not have consistent lengths; instead, Sumerian poems derived their rhythm solely through constant repetition and parallelism, with subtle variations between lines. Indo-European epic poetry, by contrast, usually places strong emphasis on the importance of line consistency and poetic meter. Ancient Greek epics were composed in dactylic hexameter. Very early Latin epicists, such Livius Andronicus and Gnaeus Naevius, used Saturnian meter. By the time of Ennius, however, Latin poets had adopted dactylic hexameter.

Dactylic hexameter has been adapted by a few anglophone poets such as Longfellow in "Evangeline", whose first line is as follows:

This is the | forest pri | meval. The | murmuring | pines and the | hemlocks

Old English, German and Norse poems were written in alliterative verse, usually without rhyme. The alliterative form can be seen in the Old English "Finnsburg Fragment" (alliterated sounds are in bold):

Ac onwacnigeað nū, wīgend mīne
ealra ǣrest eorðbūendra,

Translation:

But awake now, my warriors,
of all first the men

While the above classical and Germanic forms would be considered stichic, Italian, Spanish and Portuguese long poems favored stanzaic forms, usually written in terza rima or especially ottava rima. Terza rima is a rhyming verse stanza form that consists of an interlocking three-line rhyme scheme. An example is found in the first lines of the Divine Comedy by Dante, who originated the form:

Nel mezzo del cammin di nostra vita (A)
mi ritrovai per una selva oscura (B)
ché la diritta via era smarrita. (A)

Ahi quanto a dir qual era è cosa dura (B)
esta selva selvaggia e aspra e forte (C)
che nel pensier rinnova la paura! (B)

In ottava rima, each stanza consists of three alternate rhymes and one double rhyme, following the ABABABCC rhyme scheme. Example:

Canto l'arme pietose, e 'l Capitano
Che 'l gran sepolcro liberò di Cristo.
Molto egli oprò col senno e con la mano;
Molto soffrì nel glorioso acquisto:
E invan l'Inferno a lui s'oppose; e invano
s'armò d'Asia e di Libia il popol misto:
Chè 'l Ciel gli diè favore, e sotto ai santi
Segni ridusse i suoi compagni erranti.

— Tasso. Gerusalemme Liberata. lines 1–8.
Translation:

The sacred armies, and the godly knight,
That the great sepulchre of Christ did free,
I sing; much wrought his valor and foresight,
And in that glorious war much suffered he;
In vain 'gainst him did Hell oppose her might,
In vain the Turks and Morians armèd be:
His soldiers wild, to brawls and mutines prest,
Reducèd he to peace, so Heaven him blest.

— Translation by Edward Fairfax

From the 14th century English epic poems were written in heroic couplets, and rhyme royal, though in the 16th century the Spenserian stanza and blank verse were also introduced. The French alexandrine is currently the heroic line in French literature, though in earlier literature – such as the chanson de geste – the decasyllable grouped in laisses took precedence. In Polish literature, couplets of Polish alexandrines (syllabic lines of 7+6 syllables) prevail. In Russian, iambic tetrameter verse is the most popular. In Serbian poetry, the decasyllable is the only form employed.

Balto-Finnic (e.g. Estonian, Finnish, Karelian) folk poetry uses a form of trochaic tetrameter that has been called the Kalevala meter. The Finnish and Estonian national epics, Kalevala and Kalevipoeg, are both written in this meter. The meter is thought to have originated during the Proto-Finnic period.

In Indic epics such as the Ramayana and Mahabharata, the shloka form is used.

== Genres and related forms ==
The primary form of epic, especially as discussed in this article, is the heroic epic, including such works as the Iliad and Mahabharata. Ancient sources also recognized didactic epic as a category, represented by such works as Hesiod's Works and Days and Lucretius's De rerum natura.

Influential epics that have shaped Western literature and culture include Homer's Iliad and Odyssey; Virgil's Aeneid; and the anonymous Beowulf. The genre has inspired the adjective epic as well as derivative works in other mediums (such as epic films) that evoke or emulate the characteristics of epics.

A related type of poetry is the epyllion (plural: epyllia), a brief narrative poem with a romantic or mythological theme. The term, which means "little epic", came into use in the nineteenth century. It refers primarily to the erudite, shorter hexameter poems of the Hellenistic period and the similar works composed at Rome from the age of the neoterics; to a lesser degree, the term includes some poems of the English Renaissance, particularly those influenced by Ovid. The most famous example of classical epyllion is perhaps Catullus 64.

Epyllion is to be understood as distinct from mock epic, another light form.

Romantic epic is a term used to designate works such as Morgante, Orlando Innamorato, Orlando Furioso and Gerusalemme Liberata, which freely lift characters, themes, plots and narrative devices from the world of prose chivalric romance.

=== Non-European forms ===
Long poetic narratives that do not fit the traditional European definition of the heroic epic are sometimes known as folk epics. Indian folk epics have been investigated by Lauri Honko (1998), Brenda Beck (1982) and John Smith, amongst others. Folk epics are an important part of community identities.

==== Egypt ====
The folk genre known as al-sira relates the saga of the Hilālī tribe and their migrations across the Middle East and north Africa, see Bridget Connelly (1986).

==== India ====
In India, folk epics reflect the caste system of Indian society and the life of the lower levels of society, such as cobblers and shepherds, see C.N. Ramachandran, "Ambivalence and Angst: A Note on Indian folk epics," in Lauri Honko (2002. p. 295). Some Indian oral epics feature strong women who actively pursue personal freedom in their choice of a romantic partner (Stuart, Claus, Flueckiger and Wadley, eds, 1989, p. 5).

==== Japan ====
Japanese traditional performed narratives were sung by blind singers. One of the most famous, The Tale of the Heike, deals with historical wars and had a ritual function to placate the souls of the dead (Tokita 2015, p. 7).

==== Africa ====
A variety of epic forms are found in Africa. Some have a linear, unified style while others have a more cyclical, episodic style (Barber 2007, p. 50). The best known of African epics is Epic of Sundiata from Mali. Some contemporary scholarship presses against the bifurcation of "epic vs. novel".

There is also the epic of "Kelefaa Saane", "part of the repertoire that maintains the memory of a legendary warrior prince of Kaabu, a kingdom in the Senegambian area of West Africa, in the nineteenth century".

==== China ====
People in the rice cultivation zones of south China sang long narrative songs about the origin of rice growing, rebel heroes, and transgressive love affairs (McLaren 2022). The borderland ethnic populations of China sang heroic epics, such as the Epic of King Gesar of the Mongols, and the creation-myth epics of the Yao people of south China.

== See also ==
- Albanian epic poetry
- Arabic epic literature
- Alpamysh
- Bosniak epic poetry
- Bylina
- Calliope (Greek muse of epic poetry)
- Caribbean epic poetry
- Chanson de geste
- Duma (Ukrainian epic)
- Elegiac
- Epic fiction
  - List of epic poems
  - List of world folk-epics
  - Epic fantasy
  - Epic film
  - Epic theatre
- Hebrew and Jewish epic poetry
- History painting
- Indian epic poetry
- Epic of Manas
- Mock epic
- Monomyth
- Narrative poetry
- National epic
- National poet
- Oral literature
- Rimur
- Serbian epic poetry

== Bibliography ==
- Cavallo, Jo Ann, ed. (27 July 2023). Teaching World Epics. Modern Language Association of America. ISBN 978-1-60329-618-2.
- de Vries, Jan (1978). Heroic Song and Heroic Legend. Arno Press. ISBN 0-405-10566-5.
- Hashmi, Alamgir (2011). "Eponymous écriture and the poetics of reading a transnational epic". Dublin Quarterly. Vol. 15.
- Frye, Northrop (2015) [1957]. Anatomy of Criticism. Princeton, NJ: Princeton University Press. ISBN 978-1-4008-6690-8.
- Heinsdorff, Cornel (2003). Christus, Nikodemus und die Samaritanerin bei Juvencus. Mit einem Anhang zur lateinischen Evangelienvorlage. Untersuchungen zur antiken Literatur und Geschichte. Vol. 67. Berlin, DE / New York, NY. ISBN 3-11-017851-6.
- Jansen, Jan; Henk, J; Maier, M.J., eds. (2004). Epic Adventures: Heroic narrative in the oral performance traditions of four continents. Literatur: Forschung und Wissenschaft (in German). Vol. 3. LIT Verlag.
- Parrander, Patrick (1980). "Science fiction as epic". Science Fiction: Its criticism and teaching. London, UK: Methuen. pp. 88–105. ISBN 978-0-416-71400-5.
- Reichl, Karl. "Oral epics along the Silk Road: the Turkic traditions of Xinjiang." Chinoperl 38, no. 1 (2019): 45-63.
- Reitz, Christiane; Finkmann, Simone, eds. (2019). Structures of Epic Poetry. Berlin, DE / Boston, MA: De Gruyter. ISBN 978-3-11-049200-2.
- Tillyard, E.M.W. (1966) [1954]. The English Epic and Its Background. New York: Oxford UP.
- Wilkie, Brian (1965). Romantic Poets and Epic Tradition. University of Wisconsin Press.
