= Nostalgia (novel) =

Novel by Mircea Cărtărescu

- 1993 Romanian edition
- Author: Mircea Cărtărescu
- Translator: Julian Semilian
- Cover artist: Sylvia Frezzolini Severance
- Language: Romanian
- Genre: Novel
- Publisher: Cartea Românească; Humanitas
- Publication date: 1989; 1993
- Publication place: Romania
- English publication date: 2005
- Media type: Print
- Pages: 317
- ISBN: 973-28-0403-3
- OCLC: 31046780
- Dewey Decimal: 859/.335 22
- LC Class: PC840.13.A86 N6713 2005

Nostalgia is a novel by the Romanian writer Mircea Cărtărescu.

It was first published in Romania under the title Visul ("The Dream") in 1989 with Cartea Românească Publishing House, having been mangled by censors. It appeared in its full form as Nostalgia in 1993 under Humanitas. It was thereafter translated into French, German, Hungarian, Spanish, and other languages, and was nominated for literary prizes across Europe, including the Latin Union Prize. In 2005, the novel was translated to English by Julian Semilian and published by New Directions.

== Plot ==
The first section, which is itself the prologue, describes the world of a pre-war Bucharest, as narrated by an aging, potentially dying, author while focusing on the improbable and explicitly impossible story of a homeless young man who serves as the stubborn center of progressively more absurd games of Russian roulette which become progressively more peopled by the wealthy upper-crust of the capital.

The second section brings alive a universe of children through a magical realist writing style that focuses upon a prepubescent messiah who has begun to lose his magical powers while working wonders for his young followers. This section has a famous scene that makes the reader feel voyeur into the world of Marcel Proust when the main character falls into "unbearable nostalgia" by virtue of a bright pink lighter.

The third section is an exploration of the pinnacle of romantic love between two adolescents, culminating with them swapping souls after their first night together.

The final part of the main portion of this book is centered around Nana, a middle aged woman engaged in an affair with a college student, as well as her memories of being 12 years old, when she was visited by a mother and son pair of gigantic skeletons.

The last portion of this novel focuses on a man who becomes obsessed with his car horn, the repercussions of which spiral far beyond his control.

== Reception ==
In the introduction to the New Directions edition of the English translation, Andrei Codrescu, writer, critic, and National Public Radio host, described the book as an introduction to "a writer who has always had a place reserved for him in a constellation that includes the Brothers Grimm, E. T. A. Hoffmann, Franz Kafka. Jorge Luis Borges, Bruno Schulz, Julio Cortázar, Gabriel García Márquez, Milan Kundera, and Milorad Pavić, to mention just a few."

Laura Savu wrote about Cărtărescu in World Literature Today: "His intellectual fervor, dazzling linguistic play, and visceral prose...often touch a cultural nerve."

== See also ==
- 1993 in literature
- Romanian literature
