= The Encyclopedia of Dragons =

2002 book by Mircea Cărtărescu

- Author: Mircea Cărtărescu
- Original title: Enciclopedia zmeilor
- Illustrator: Tudor Banus
- Language: Romanian
- Publisher: Humanitas
- Publication date: 2002
- Publication place: Romania
- Pages: 163
- ISBN: 9735002906

The Encyclopedia of Dragons (Romanian: Enciclopedia zmeilor) is a 2002 book by the Romanian writer Mircea Cărtărescu, with illustrations by Tudor Banus. It focuses on dragons in Romanian folklore, and includes ten short stories about dragons. Cărtărescu groups it with his books Why We Love Women and Beautiful Strangers as a trilogy of prose with lower literary ambition.

== See also ==
- 2002 in literature
- Romanian literature
