= 2026 Cinemalaya =

Filipino independent film festival

22nd Cinemalaya Independent Film Festival
- Location: Metro Manila, Philippines
- Film titles: 9
- Festival date: August 6–18, 2026
- Website: www.cinemalaya.org

Cinemalaya chronology
- 2027 2025

The 22nd Cinemalaya Independent Film Festival was held from August 6 to 18, 2026, in Metro Manila, Philippines.

The 2026 edition reverted to the traditional August schedule, the 2025 edition having been held in October.

== Entries ==
The official entries were announced on July 8, 2026.

Feature films

Title	Director	Starring	Genre
A.ni.mal	Dustin Celestino	Maxine Ignacio, Frances Makil-Ignacio, Jojit Lorenzo, Bituin Escalante, Reymund Domingo, Anthony Falcon	Black comedy, Social satire
2 Valid IDs	Asuncion Dagnalan	Marietta Subong, Joey Marquez, Zaijian Jaranilla, Meryll Soriano	Social drama
Ganggang	JL Burgos	Raine Dela Cruz, Kenneth "Butchoy" Vincent Mendoza, Don Rishmond Cerbito, Prince España	Coming-of-age drama
Hand of God	Mark Duane Angos	Ruru Madrid, Iza Calzado, Ronnie Lazaro, Sue Ramirez, KD Omalin, Jhong Hilario, Cholo Barretto, Edwin Nombre, Rosh Barman, Tyke Sanchez	Drama
Mag-iina	Giancarlo Abrahan	Janine Gutierrez, Lucas Andalio, Cherry Pie Picache, Agot Isidro, Ness Roque, Jackie Lou Blanco	Horror
Kaka sa Yawan	Alpha Habon	Bryce Nicolo Mercader, Beaver Magtalas, Luis Alandy, Nikki Valdez	Drama
Status: Rejected	Vahn Leinard Pascual	Ruby Ruiz, Alessandra de Rossi, Beverly Salviejo, Yani Villarosa	Family dramedy
Tayo Lang Ang Nakakaalam	David Corpuz	Martin del Rosario, Yayo Aguila, Miguel Odron, Epy Quizon	Queer drama
Tirik	May-I Badilla	Rocco Nacino, Floyd Tena	Thriller

Short films

Title	Director(s)
Elenita Elena Elaine	Gabriela Serrano
Honey, My Love, So Sweet	Jt Trinidad
Hoy, Hoy, Ingat!	Norvin Delos Santos
Kung Paano Kakalas.	Joseph Vitali
Para-paraan	Mae Chan
Li Runo!	Lysa Catolico; Jazmine Pateña
Silkscreen	Rey Anthony Villaverde
Sorbetes	Jennissie Gilbuena
The Keeper	Nolan Rae Fabular And Trnz
The River Flows In Different Places	Lot-lot Hermosura

== Awards ==
2026 Cinemalaya Awards Night
- Date: August 17, 2026
- Site: Shangri-La Plaza, Mandaluyong

The awards ceremony was held on August 17, 2026. The following awards were given:

Feature films

- Best Film – Mag-iina by Giancarlo Abrahan and Guelan Varela-Luarca
  - Special Jury Award – 2 Valid IDs by Ma-an L. Asuncion-Dagñalan and Abet Pagdagdagan Raz
  - Audience Choice Award – 2 Valid IDs by Ma-an L. Asuncion-Dagñalan and Abet Pagdagdagan Raz
- Best Direction – Giancarlo Abrahan for Mag-iina
- Best Actor – Martin del Rosario for Tayo Lang Ang Nakakaalam
- Best Actress – Marietta Subong for 2 Valid IDs and Ruby Ruiz for Status: Rejected (co-winners)
- Best Supporting Actor – Lucas Andalio for Mag-iina and KD Omalin for Hand of God (co-winners)
- Best Supporting Actress – Bituin Escalante for A.ni.mál
- Best Screenplay – Guelan Varela-Luarca for Mag-iina
- Best Cinematography – Adam Dumaguin for Tayo Lang Ang Nakakaalam
- Best Editing – John Rogers for A.ni.mál
- Best Sound – Elian Idioma for Tayo Lang Ang Nakakaalam
- Best Original Music Score – David Yuhico for Mag-iina
- Best Production Design – Katrish Aristoki for Mag-iina

Short films

- Best Film – Silkscreen by Rey Anthony Villaverde
  - Special Jury Award – Para-Paraan by Mae Chan Li
  - Audience Choice Award – Hoy, Hoy, Ingat! by Norvin de los Santos
- Best Screenplay – RUNO! by Lysa Catolico and Jazmine Gin R. Pateña
- Best Direction – Gabriela Serrano for Elenita, Elena, Elaine

Special awards

- NETPAC Full-length Feature Award: Status: Rejected by Vahn Leinard C. Pascual
- NETPAC Short Film Award: The River Flows in Different Places by Lot-Lot Hermosura
