= Miguel Odron =

- Born: Butuan, Philippines
- Origin: Indiana, United States
- Occupations: Singer-songwriter; Actor
- Instruments: Vocals; Guitar
- Years active: 2019–present
- Labels: ABS-CBN Music International, Tarsier Records

Miguel Odron is a Filipino-American actor and singer-songwriter. He rose to prominence as one of the finalists in the first season of Idol Philippines in 2019, where he finished in the Top 5. Known for his soulful vocal style and songwriting ability, Odron later pursued a recording career and released several singles under ABS-CBN Music International and Tarsier Records.

== Early life ==
Odron was born in Butuan, Philippines, and was later raised in Indiana, United States. He eventually returned to the Philippines to pursue a music career.

== Career ==
=== Idol Philippines (2019) ===
Odron auditioned for the first season of Idol Philippines in 2019. His distinct, understated style earned praise from the judges, particularly Regine Velasquez. He advanced to the finals and ultimately finished in fifth place.

=== Post–Idol Philippines ===
In February 2020, Odron released his debut single, "Chevy Cruze", under ABS-CBN Music International.

In 2021, he reinterpreted Air Supply's classic hit "Lost in Love" for a tribute compilation by Tarsier Records, blending neo-soul, chill-hop, and bossa nova elements.

In 2022, Odron released the single "Still", described as a poignant love letter to his first love. The track was slated to be included in his planned album San Rojo.

=== Acting ===
In his acting debut, Odron is the leading cast in the 2024 road drama film titled Some Nights I Feel Like Walking directed by Petersen Vargas. The film premiered in numerous film festival including Tallinn Black Nights Film Festival on November 13, 2024, Golden Horse Film Festival and Awards on November 17, 2024, Singapore International Film Festival on December 2, 2024 and on Jogja-NETPAC Asian Film Festival on December 4, 2024.

It was also premiered at Glasgow Film Festival on February February 28, 2025, BFI Flare: London LGBTIQ+ Film Festival on March 26, 2025, Macao International Queer Film Festival on June 8, 2025, QCinema RainbowQC Pride Film Festival on June 26, 2025, and has limited release in the Philippines on August 27, 2025.

== Personal life ==
On June 30, 2020, Odron publicly came out as gay in a social media post during Pride Month. He stated that during Idol Philippines, he chose not to discuss his sexuality so that the focus would remain on his music. He clarified that ABS-CBN did not pressure him to hide his identity.

== Discography ==
=== Singles ===
Some of the tracks are composed by Miguel Odron.

Title	Release date	Composer(s)	Album	Ref(s)
"Southside"	January 8, 2018	Miguel Odron	Non-album singles	
"Follow"	July 28, 2019	Miguel Odron	Idol Philippines season 1	
"Chevy Cruze"	March 16, 2020	Miguel Odron	Non-album singles	
"Weed"	August 8, 2020	Miguel Odron	Non-album singles	
"Lost In Love"	May 24, 2021	Graham Russell	Non-album singles	
"Pull Down The Stockings"	December 17, 2021	Miguel Odron	Non-album singles	
"Still"	June 17, 2022	Miguel Odron	Non-album singles	
"Drown"	July 15, 2022	Miguel Odron	Non-album singles	
"Ulam"	October 20, 2023	Miguel Odron	Non-album singles	
"Ang Jowa Mong Tigang"	March 12, 2024	Miguel Odron	Non-album singles	

== Filmography ==
=== Film ===
Year	Title	Role	Notes	Ref.
2024	Some Nights I Feel Like Walking	Zion	28th Tallinn Black Nights Film Festival entry	
2026	Tayo Lang Ang Nakakaalam	Bong	22nd Cinemalaya Independent Film Festival entry	

=== Television ===
Year	Title	Role	Ref!
2019	Idol Philippines season 1	Himself / Contestant	

== Awards and nominations ==
Accolades received by Miguel Odron
Award	Year	Category	Nominated Work	Result	Ref.
Cinemalaya Philippine Independent Film Festival	2026	Best Ensemble Performance	Tayo Lang Ang Nakakaalam	Won (Note: Shared with Martin del Rosario, Yayo Aguila, and Jeffrey Quizon.)	
Gawad Urian Award	2026	Best Actor	Some Nights I Feel Like Walking	Nominated	
Myx Music Awards	2021	New Artist of the Year	—N/a	Nominated	
PMPC Star Awards for Movies	2026	New Movie Actor of the Year	Some Nights I Feel Like Walking	Nominated	

== See also ==
- Idol Philippines (season 1)
