= Tayo Lang Ang Nakakaalam =

2026 drama film by David R. Corpuz

- Theatrical release poster
- Directed by: David R. Corpuz
- Written by: Iar Arondaing; David R. Corpuz
- Produced by: Kristine Camille Sulit; Patricia Salic
- Starring: Martin del Rosario; Yayo Aguila; Miguel Odron; Epy Quizon
- Cinematography: Adam Dumaguin
- Edited by: Joris Fernandez
- Music by: Glenn Barit
- Distributed by: Cinemalaya
- Release date: August 7, 2026 (Cinemalaya)
- Running time: 110 minutes
- Country: Philippines
- Language: Filipino

Tayo Lang Ang Nakakaalam (lit. 'Only known to us') is a 2026 Philippine LGBTQ drama film directed by David R. Corpuz and co-written by Iar Arondaing. It stars Martin del Rosario, Yayo Aguila, Miguel Odron, and Epy Quizon.

== Premise ==
Neil and Bong are long-term partners who share a close bond with Bong's parents, particularly his mother, Gloria. Their lives are disrupted when Bong is hospitalized after falling ill. As Neil balances caring for Bong with his work responsibilities, and Bong's estranged father, Benjie, attempts to reconnect with the family, long-held tensions and hidden secrets emerge, testing the relationships among Neil, Bong, and Bong's family.

== Cast ==
- Martin del Rosario as Neil
- Miguel Odron as Bong
- Yayo Aguila as Gloria, Bong's mother
- Epy Quizon as Benjie, Bong's father
- Madeleine Nicolas as Neil's mother

== Production ==
Tayo Lang Ang Nakakaalam was directed by David Corpuz. The script for the film was written back in 2018 by Corpuz and Iar Arondaing and is loosely inspired by Corpuz's Palanca Awards-winning essay Autoetnograpiya ng Luksa.

Corpuz has submitted the script to various film grants and festivals but was never selected prior to its inclusion in the 2026 Cinemalaya. He shelved the script in 2019, after reaching the semifinals with producer Kristine Camille Sulit encouraging Corpuz to enter the film in the 2026 film festival.

The film tackles about the relationship of two closeted gay men, whose identities are only known to their family. Bong deals with the stigma of HIV/AIDS which was concealed as advanced colon cancer.

== Release ==
Tayo Lang Ang Nakakaalam is among the nine official feature film entries at the 2026 Cinemalaya.
