= Beautiful Strangers =

Book by Mircea Cărtărescu

- First edition
- Author: Mircea Cărtărescu
- Original title: Frumoasele străine
- Language: Romanian
- Publisher: Humanitas
- Publication date: 2010
- Publication place: Romania
- Pages: 298
- ISBN: 978-973-50-2692-9

Beautiful Strangers (Romanian: Frumoasele străine) is a 2010 prose collection by the Romanian writer Mircea Cărtărescu. It consists of stories Cărtărescu wrote for the magazine Seven Nights. Cărtărescu groups it with his earlier books The Encyclopedia of Dragons and Why We Love Women as a trilogy of prose with lower literary ambition. Beautiful Strangers was the ninth best-selling book overall in Romania in 2010.

== Writing process ==
The book consists of texts written for the free-of-charge leisure magazine Seven Nights and Cărtărescu has called it "a little book which I could say wrote itself", since the contract with the magazine meant that "even if you've run out of ideas and inspiration, every week you need to have a topic you've got to write about". The topics for the episodes were inspired by current affairs and a trip to Paris. Cărtărescu aimed to stay within the conventions of the magazine, adopting a literary style less ambitious than in his novels, while avoiding being vulgar.

== See also ==
- 2010 in literature
- Romanian literature
