= Status: Rejected =

2026 drama film by Vahn Leinard C. Pascual

- Directed by: Vahn Leinard C. Pascual
- Screenplay by: Vahn Leinard C. Pascual; Jaymar S. Castro; Ivan V. Gentolizo
- Story by: Vahn Leinard C. Pascual
- Produced by: Omar Sortijas; Micah Tadena; Fea Fortuna
- Starring: Ruby Ruiz; Alessandra de Rossi; Beverly Salviejo; Yani Villarosa
- Cinematography: Martika R. Escobar
- Edited by: Che Tagyamon
- Music by: Hans Rivera
- Production companies: Black Cap Pictures; Clever Minds
- Distributed by: Cinemalaya
- Release date: 7 August 2026 (Cinemalaya)
- Running time: 90 minutes
- Country: Philippines
- Language: Filipino

Status: Rejected is a 2026 Philippine family comedy-drama film directed by Vahn Leinard C. Pascual in his feature film directorial debut and co-written by Jaymar S. Castro and Ivan V. Gentolizo. Starring Ruby Ruiz, Alessandra de Rossi, Beverly Salviejo, and Yani Villarosa, the story follows a widow who yearns for love and new beginnings in life and gets drawn into an unforeseen online relationship that tests her self-worth, familial bonds, and the aspirations she is determined to hold onto.

A co-production of Black Cap Pictures and Clever Minds, the film premiered on 7 August 2026 as an official entry in the 22nd Cinemalaya Independent Film Festival and a nationwide release was held on 18 November.

== Cast ==
- Ruby Ruiz as Virginia "Biring" Divinagracia
- Alessandra de Rossi as Anna
- Beverly Salviejo as Tessie
- Yani Villarosa as Sophia

== Production ==
=== Development ===
The premise was based on the experiences of filmmaker Vahn Leinard Pascual's grandmother, which he "loosely described" as a "love scam movie". Pascual, who recently graduated from De La Salle–College of Saint Benilde and directed numerous short films that received acclaim from local and overseas critics, submitted three entries to Cinemalaya, and its selection committee ultimately chose the concept of Status: Rejected, which was then titled Friend Request Sent.

=== Casting ===
Pascual considered casting Vilma Santos and Chanda Romero for the role of Biring before the team decided to cast Ruby Ruiz after film producer Micah Tadena and production companies Clever Minds and Black Cap Pictures joined the project.

== Reception ==
=== Critical response ===
Justin Caunan, writing for Sinegang PH, praised the film for its smooth transition from a satire on colonial history to a poignant examination of family disconnection. He highlighted the outstanding performances of Ruby Ruiz and Beverly Salviejo, noting how the film depicts the emotional complexity of online isolation, family issues, and the relentless pursuit of greater opportunities abroad, ultimately describing it as an impressive debut that showcases the difficult daily realities and fading hopes of modern Filipino existence.

=== Accolades ===
Award-giving organization	Date of ceremony	Category	Recipient(s)	Result	Ref.
22nd Cinemalaya Independent Film Festival	17 August 2026	Best Actress	Ruby Ruiz	Won (Note: Tied with Marietta "Pokwang" Subong.)	
22nd Cinemalaya Independent Film Festival	17 August 2026	NETPAC Full-length Feature Award	Status: Rejected	Won	
