= Mircea Cărtărescu =

Romanian novelist, poet, short-story writer, literary critic and essayist

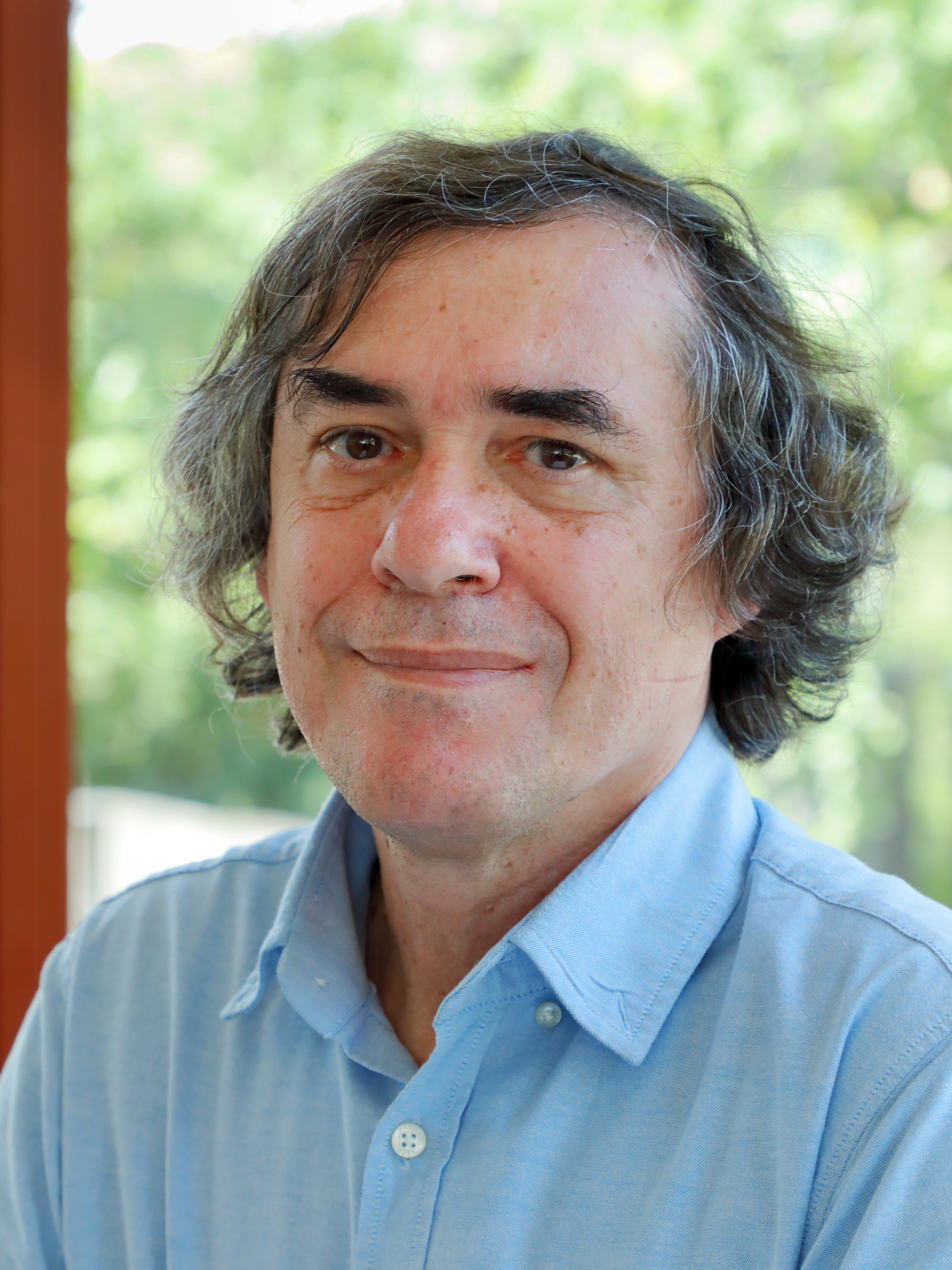
- Mircea Cărtărescu, 2024
- Born: 1 June 1956 (age 70); Bucharest, Romania
- Education: University of Bucharest
- Occupations: Novelist, poet, short-story writer, essayist, journalist, university professor
- Spouse: Ioana Nicolaie
- Writing career
- Years active: 1978–present
- Movements: 80s Generation, Blue Jeans Generation, Postmodernism

Mircea Cărtărescu (Romanian pronunciation: [ˈmirtʃe̯a kərtəˈresku]; born 1 June 1956) is a Romanian novelist, poet, short-story writer, literary critic, and essayist.

== Biography ==
Born in Bucharest in 1956, he attended Cantemir Vodă National College during the early 1970s. During his school years, he was a member of literary groups led by Nicolae Manolescu and Ovid S. Crohmălniceanu. At that time, along with many teenagers of his generation, Cărtărescu was tremendously influenced by the legacy of the 1960s American counterculture, including artists such as Bob Dylan, Jimi Hendrix, and The Doors. He commenced writing poetry in 1978.

Later, he studied at the University of Bucharest's Faculty of Letters, Department of Romanian Language and Literature. He graduated in 1980 with a thesis that later became his book on poetry, more specifically The Chimaeric Dream. That same year, some of his works were published by Cartea Românească.

Between 1980 and 1989, Cărtărescu worked as a Romanian language teacher, then worked at the Writers' Union of Romania and as an editor at Caiete Critice magazine. In 1991, he became a lecturer at the Chair of Romanian Literary History, part of the University of Bucharest's Faculty of Letters. As of 2010, he was an associate professor there, where he still lectures to this date. Between 1994 and 1995, he was a visiting lecturer at the University of Amsterdam and currently holds the same position at the University of Stuttgart. In 2012, he received the International Literature Award for his novel The Body.

Cărtărescu is married to the Romanian poet Ioana Nicolaie, with whom he has a son. He is a full professor at the University of Bucharest within the Department of Literary Studies.

== Work ==
His debut as a writer was in 1978 with poetry published in România Literară magazine. Two years later, he published his first book, Faruri, vitrine, fotografii, which earned him the Romanian Writers' Union award for debut. The post-modern epic poem The Levant appeared in 1990, written at a time of heavy censorship by the communist regime, without much hope of being translated, and published after the fall of communism, it is a parody that encompasses writing styles touching on several other Romanian writers, most notably Mihai Eminescu, from whose poem, "Scrisoarea III", he borrowed the metrical pattern and even some lines.

In 2010, Blinding was voted novel of the decade by Romanian literary critics.

His works have been translated into most European languages (including Spanish, French and English) and published in Europe, Hispanic America, and the United States.

Cărtărescu has been rumoured to have been nominated for the Nobel Prize in Literature multiple times, and has been considered one of the favorites to win the award. (Note: However, it's important to note that the Nobel Prize nomination process is confidential, and the official nominations are not publicly disclosed until 50 years later. Therefore, while Cărtărescu's name might have been mentioned as a potential nominee, the actual nominations and candidates are not confirmed publicly.) In 2023, when Swedish journalist Carsten Palmer Schale had included him on a short list of favourites for the award, Cărtărescu himself said that he is thankful for being included in such a list, and that he doesn't wish for anything more.

=== Poetry ===
- Faruri, vitrine, fotografii..., ("Headlights, shop windows, photographs...") Cartea Românească, 1980 – Writers Union Prize for debut, 1980
- Poeme de amor ("Love Poems"), Cartea Românească, 1982
- Totul ("Everything"), Cartea Românească, 1984
- Levantul (The Levant), Cartea Românească, 1990 – Writers Union Prize, 1990, republished by Humanitas in 1998
- Dragostea ("Love"), Humanitas, 1994
- 50 de sonete de Mircea Cărtărescu cu cincizeci de desene de Tudor Jebeleanu ("50 Sonnets by Mircea Cărtărescu With Fifty Drawings by Tudor Jebeleanu"), Brumar 2003
- Nimic, Poeme (1988–1992) ("Nothing, Poems, 1988-1992"), Humanitas, 2010
- Nu striga niciodată ajutor ("Never Call For Help"), Humanitas, 2020

=== Prose ===
- Desant '83 (Cartea Românească, 1983)
- Visul (Cartea Românească, 1989). The Dream
- Nostalgia (Humanitas, 1993; full edition of Visul). Trans. Julian Semilian (New Directions, 2005; ISBN 0-8112-1588-1), with introduction by Andrei Codrescu
- Travesti (Humanitas, 1994)
- Orbitor, vol. 1, Aripa stângă (Humanitas, 1996). Blinding, Book One: The Left Wing, trans. Sean Cotter (Archipelago Books, 2013)
- Jurnal (Humanitas, 2001). 2nd ed.: Jurnal I, 1990–1996 (Humanitas, 2005, ISBN 973-50-0985-4)
- Orbitor, vol. 2, Corpul (Humanitas, 2002). Blinding, Book Two: The Body
- Enciclopedia zmeilor (Humanitas, 2002). The Encyclopedia of Dragons
- De ce iubim femeile (Humanitas, 2004). Why We Love Women, trans. Alistair Ian Blyth (University of Plymouth Press, 2011; ISBN 1841022063)
- Jurnal II, 1997–2003 (Humanitas, 2005). Diary II, 1997–2003
- Orbitor, vol. 3, Aripa dreaptă (Humanitas, 2007). Blinding, Book Three: The Right Wing
- Frumoasele străine (Humanitas, 2010). Beautiful Strangers
- Zen, Jurnal 2004-2010 (Humanitas, 2011). Zen, Diary 2004-2010
- Solenoid (Humanitas, 2015). Trans. Sean Cotter (Deep Vellum, 2022)
- Un om care scrie, Jurnal 2011-2017 (Humanitas, 2018). A Man Who Writes, Diary 2011-2017
- Melancolia (Humanitas, 2019). Melancholy
- Theodoros (Humanitas, 2022). Theodoros, trans. Sean Cotter (Deep Vellum, 2026)

=== Essays ===
- Visul chimeric (subteranele poeziei eminesciene) ("Chimerical Dream – The Underground of Eminescu's Poetry"), Litera, 1991
- Postmodernismul românesc ("Romanian Postmodernism"), Ph.D. thesis, Humanitas, 1999
- Pururi tânăr, înfășurat în pixeli ("Forever Young, Wrapped in Pixels"), Humanitas, 2003
- Baroane! ("You Baron!"), Humanitas, 2005
- Ochiul căprui al dragostei noastre ("Our Love's Hazel Eye"), Humanitas, 2012
- Peisaj după isterie ("Landscape, After Histrionics"), Humanitas, 2017
- Creionul de tâmplărie ("A Carpenter's Pencil"), Humanitas, 2020
- Texistența (“Text Existence”), Humanitas, 2026

=== Audiobooks ===
- Parfumul aspru al ficțiunii ("The Rough Fragrance of Fiction"), Humanitas, 2003

=== Anthologies ===
- Testament – Anthology of Modern Romanian Verse (1850–2015) second edition – bilingual version English/Romanian. Daniel Ioniță – editor and principal translator, with Eva Foster, Daniel Reynaud and Rochelle Bews. Minerva Publishing House. Bucharest 2015. ISBN 978-973-21-1006-5

== Awards and honours ==
- 1980: Romanian Writers' Union Prize
- 1989: Romanian Academy's Prize, for Visul
- 1990: Romanian Writer's Unions Prize, Flacăra magazine Prize, Ateneu magazine Prize, Tomis magazine Prize, Cuvântul magazine Prize
- 1992: Le Rêve nominee for: Prix Médicis, Prix Union Latine, Le meilleur livre étranger
- 1994: Romanian Writer's Union Prize, ASPRO Prize, Moldavian Writers' Union Prize, for Travesti
- 1996: ASPRO Prize, Flacăra magazine Prize, Ateneu magazine Prize, Tomis magazine Prize, Cuvântul magazine Prize
- 1997: Flacăra magazine Prize, Ateneu magazine Prize, Tomis magazine Prize, Cuvântul magazine Prize
- 1999: Orbitor's French translation nominee for Prix Union Latine
- 2000: Romanian Writers Association Prize
- 2002: ASPRO Prize, AER Prize
- 2006: Grand Officer of the Cultural Merit Order (Ordinul "Meritul cultural" în grad de mare ofițer), awarded by Romanian Presidency
- 2011: Vilenica Prize
- 2012: International literatur prize "Haus der Kulturen der Welt 2012", Berlin
- 2013: Spycher – Literary Prize Leuk, Switzerland
- 2013: Grand Prix of the Novi Sad International Poetry Festival
- 2014: Best Translated Book Award, shortlisted for Blinding, translated from the Romanian into English by Sean Cotter
- 2014: Premio Euskadi de Plata to the Best Book of 2014 for Las Bellas Extranjeras (Frumoasele străine), translated from the Romanian into Spanish by Marian Ochoa de Eribe (Editorial Impedimenta)
- 2015: Leipzig Book Award for European Understanding for Blinding
- 2015: Austrian State Prize for European Literature
- 2016: Premio Gregor von Rezzori for Blinding
- 2018: Thomas Mann Prize
- 2018: Prix Formentor
- 2022: FIL Award
- 2023: Los Angeles Times Book Prize for Solenoid
- 2024: Dublin Literary Award for Solenoid
- 2025: longlisted for the International Booker Prize for Solenoid, translated by Sean Cotter
