= Lucas Andalio =

Filipino child actor (born 2018)

- Born: July 4, 2018 (age 8)
- Occupation: Actor
- Years active: 2024–present
- Agent: Star Magic
- Known for: Goin' Bulilit
- Relatives: Loisa Andalio (aunt) Ronnie Alonte (uncle)
- Awards: Best Child Performer (2025 Metro Manila Film Festival)

Lucas Andalio (born July 4, 2018) is a Filipino child actor. He is known for his role in the 2025 film Call Me Mother, for which he won the Best Child Performer award at the 51st Metro Manila Film Festival. He is also a cast member of the television show Goin' Bulilit.

== Career ==
Andalio began his career as part of the 2024 cast of the children's comedy show Goin' Bulilit. He also appeared in the action-drama series Incognito. In that series, he played Mickey, the son of the character Miguel Tecson, who was portrayed by Baron Geisler.

In December 2025, Andalio starred in the Metro Manila Film Festival (MMFF) entry Call Me Mother. He played the role of Angelo "Angel" Reyes, a ten-year-old child involved in a custody dispute between his biological mother and his guardian. His co-stars in the film included Vice Ganda and Nadine Lustre.

Andalio received the Best Child Performer award during the MMFF Gabi ng Parangal (Awards Night) on December 27, 2025. He won the award over other nominees, including Argus Aspiras and Ellie Cruz.

During the promotion of the film, Andalio appeared on the variety show It's Showtime. On the show, he performed an impromptu crying scene that received positive feedback from the audience.

== Personal life ==
Andalio is the nephew of actress Loisa Andalio. His father is Louis Andalio. He is a student and attends school while working as an actor. His aunt stated that she taught him acting techniques, such as closing his eyes before a cue to maintain focus.

== Filmography ==
Film and television
Year	Title	Role	Notes	Ref.
2024	Goin' Bulilit	Himself / Various	Cast member	
2025	It's Showtime	Himself	Co-host	
2025	Incognito	Mickey	Supporting role	
2025	My Love Will Make You Disappear	Young Jolo	Supporting role	
2025	Call Me Mother	Angelo "Angel" de Jesus	Supporting role, Film; Won Best Child Performer (Metro Manila Film Festival)	
2026	Mag-iina (The Mothering)	Ynigo	Supporting role (22nd Cinemalaya Independent Film Festival) entry	

== Awards and nominations ==
Year	Award	Category	Work	Result	Ref.
2025	Metro Manila Film Festival	Best Child Performer	Call Me Mother	Won	
