= Christine Gambito =

American Internet celebrity (born 1975)

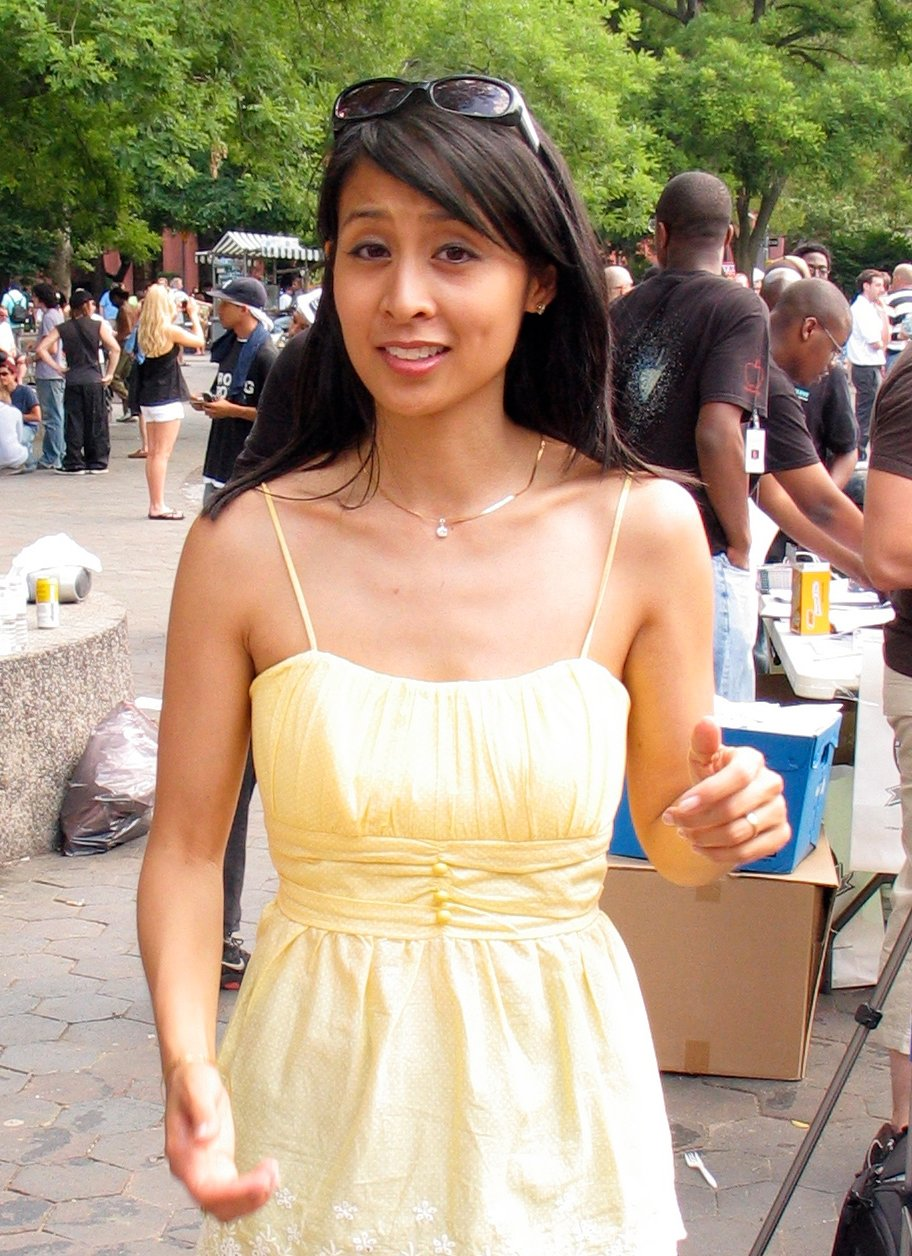
- Gambito at the 777 YouTube gathering in Washington Square Park
- Born: August 16, 1975 (age 50); Virginia Beach, Virginia, U.S
- Occupations: Internet personality; actress; comedian
- Years active: 2006–present
- Known for: Variety

YouTube information
- Channel: HappySlip
- Years active: 2006–present
- Genres: Comedy; vlogging; parody
- Subscribers: 588 thousand
- Views: 79.3 million
- Last updated: June 21, 2026
- Website: www.happyslip.com

Christine Gambito (born August 16, 1975), better known by her screen name HappySlip, is an American Internet personality, actress, and comedian. She maintained one of the most-subscribed-to channels on YouTube, a popular video sharing website. On January 25, 2008, Gambito, who is of Filipino ancestry, was appointed ambassador for Philippine tourism by the Department of Tourism.

In March 2007, Gambito's video Mixed Nuts was nominated for the 2006 YouTube Video Awards for Best Comedy, resulting in second place. In May of the same year, she became one of the first users accepted into YouTube's revenue sharing program.

Gambito's performances typically included comedy sketches in which she impersonates members of her family. She also sings and plays the piano and guitar. As Gambito has stated repeatedly in her videos, she is notably one of the very few top users who are acting, filming, editing and producing her shorts completely on her own.

== Before YouTube ==
Born of Filipino ancestry and raised in the United States, she was involved in cameo appearances and small parts of television commercials, movies, and industrial and training films.

== Origin of "HappySlip" ==
Gambito attributes her nickname "HappySlip" to her Filipino mother's mispronunciation of "half slip":

As a child, my Filipino mom would always remind me to wear a half-slip with skirts. However, the way she would pronounce the phrase was misleading: "Your hap e-slip! Be sure to wear your hap e-slip!" So I naturally went around calling the thing a 'happy slip,' until friends at school corrected me by asking if I had a 'sad slip' as well.

At her personal site, she explains that the phrase is not only a funny phrase from the past, but it also reflects what she would like people to feel when they watch her videos, hoping they will "slip into happiness" while watching.

== Videos ==
Her first sketch, Instant vlogging, was originally broadcast on September 6, 2006 and featured Gambito impersonating four different characters, each representing a different video blogging style. Due to the positive response she received from the YouTube community, two of those characters (the teenager and the girl in the "soap opera" style) were explored further in the following videos, the latter becoming the first episode of a soap opera spoof featuring two twin sisters both interpreted by Gambito. Her second video introduced many of the recurring themes in her following sketches, such as her parents' attitude towards her growing popularity over the Internet and her family's ethnic habits seen through the mind of an American. Other notable sketches include Mixed Nuts — a video depicting what she would call "a typical family discussion" which was later awarded with the second place in the 2006 YouTube Video Awards for Best Comedy — and Mac Beautiful, her first musical video, an ironic cover of the song "You're Beautiful" by James Blunt praising the beauty and efficiency of the Apple MacPro. Gambito later broadcast two videos containing original songs.

Gambito has collaborated with fellow YouTube comedian Kevin Wu (KevJumba) and has made five videos with him.

== Characters ==
Gambito is known for playing many characters within her videos. Her characters are easily recognized in her videos for their hair, attire, and personality. When portraying a character, Gambito uses wigs and notable accessories to differentiate each character when necessary.

=== Major characters ===
The following characters are still portrayed today in Gambito's videos and are all portrayed by her:

- Christine – Known as the main character in Gambito's videos seen to deal with her family's comedic traditions.
- Dad – Christine's father who is commonly seen in Gambito's videos constantly eating pork rinds. "Disaster!" is his commonly known catch phrase. The upper half of his face is not seen in any of Gambito's videos possibly to conceal Gambito's face and/or for easy recognition.
- Mom – Christine's mother known for her traditional antics with her family.
- Auntie Babie Cruz – Christine's aunt known in Gambito's videos for her comedic antics and, at times, snobby remarks.
- Minnie Cruz – Auntie Babie's shy daughter and Christine's cousin who is constantly embarrassed by her mother.
- Lola – Christine's grandmother known for her comedic confusion.
- Teenie – A teenager known for her talkative and self-absorbed attitude. Teenie is a parody of a modern, American teenager.

=== Minor characters ===
The following characters are known for their role in affecting the HappySlip universe:

- Kevin – Minnie's boyfriend whom Minnie met online. Portrayed by Kevin Wu (KevJumba).
- Fred G (not to be confused with the other Fred) – Known for his love interest in Minnie. Also known for being an opponent to Kevin in a dance battle for Minnie's love. Gambito left the judging to viewers by holding a poll on her official website with Fred losing with 12% of votes.
- Christian – Minnie's cousin sent out by Auntie Babie to watch over Minnie as she attends college. Portrayed by ninjadrops.
- Sheila & Sally Smoot – Known for their roles in 'Plop & Shop!' imitating infomercial hosts. Both portrayed by Gambito.
- Claire & Audrey – Twin sisters known for their soap opera acts. The characters became inactive after both allegedly shot each other to death. Both were portrayed by Gambito. After a recent skit they were alive and it has been the most recent of her soap operas.

== Live performances ==
Since 2018, Gambito has been touring independently performing comedy. She toured in 2018–2019, 2022, and 2023–2024 ("Stir Their Emotions" Tour).

== See also ==
- YouTube celebrities
