= PhilPost Postal ID =

Philippine identity document

Postal ID
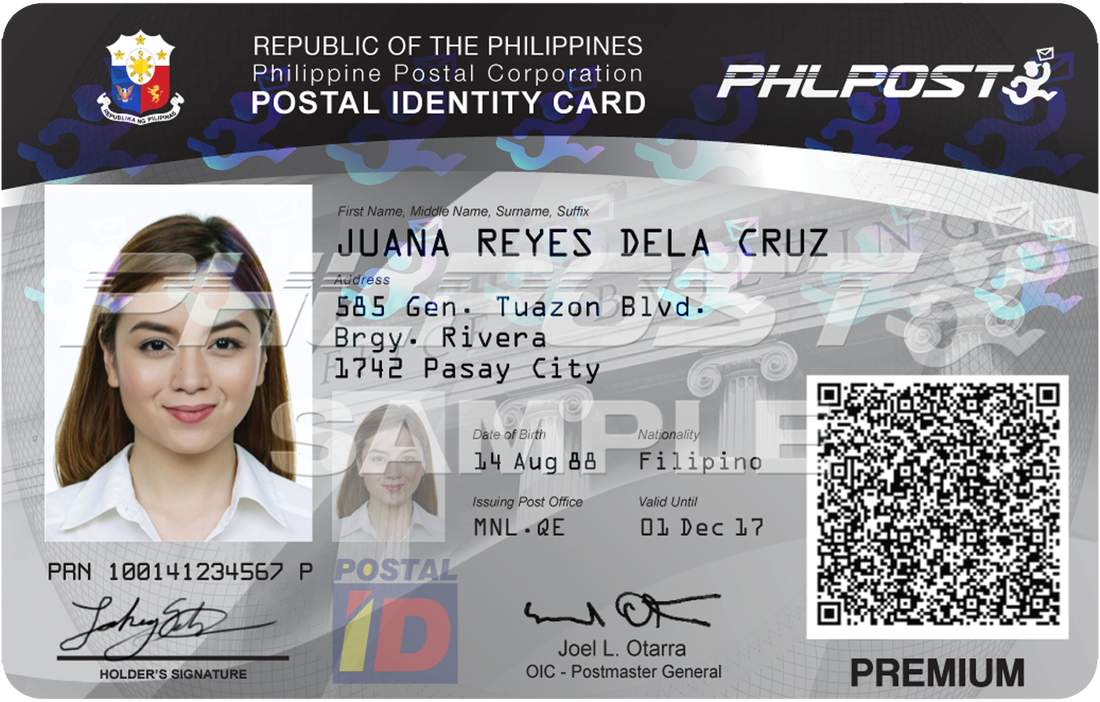
- Sample ID by PHLPost
- Type: Identity document
- Issued by: Philippines
- First issued: 2014 (PVC non-biometric); 2015 (PVC biometric; current edition)
- Purpose: Identification
- Eligibility: Filipino citizenship / at least 6 months residency for foreigners
- Expiration: 3 years (Filipino citizens and foreigners with SSRV); 1 year (foreigners without SSRV)
- Cost: ₱550 for regular processing, ₱650 for rush processing

The Postal ID (PID) is an identity card issued by the state-owned Philippine Postal Corporation. It is a valid identification document for use by Filipino citizens in availing themselves of various government services and transactions as well as in banking and other financial institutions. It was originally used by postal carriers as a means of verifying the identity of a recipient of a mail or parcel.

The current edition of the card, which was introduced in 2015, contains the holder's biometrics data that also serve as a security feature against identity theft.

PHLPost suspended the acceptance of rush and regular postal ID applications on March 10, 2023 due to technical issues. It was resumed more than a year later on October 15, 2024.

The PHLPost's Postal ID was previously made of paper protected only by laminated plastic. PHLPost introduced Postal IDs made of polyvinyl chloride (PVC) plastic in November 2014.

In 2024, PHLPost launched a globally recognized official government-issued functional card ID. Its features include the owner's name, address, birthday, signature, the seven-digit alphanumeric zip code and QR code. It is valid for 3 years with address verification system.

== Physical appearance ==
The identity card bears the following information about the holder:

- Postal Reference Number (PRN)
- Address
- Date of Birth
- Nationality (Citizenship)
- Signature

The card also contains the issuing postal office and the expiration of the validity of the card.

== Requirements ==
First-time applicants must bring the original and photocopy of the following documents:

- Copy of duly-accomplished PID application form
- One primary ID or birth certificate or two secondary IDs as proof of identity
- Marriage certificate if married woman (if documents and IDs submitted do not bear married name)
- One proof of address - Barangay Certificate of Residency, barangay residence ID, barangay clearance, certified true copy of lease, certified true copy of titles, certified true copy of real estate tax receipt, bank statement, credit card statement, school billing statement, or utility bill

For renewal, applicants must bring an original and photocopy of their expired postal ID, any proof of identity, and address.

The regular application fee costs ₱550, and a rush processing option is available for ₱650.
