= Rex Navarrete =

American comedian (born 1969)

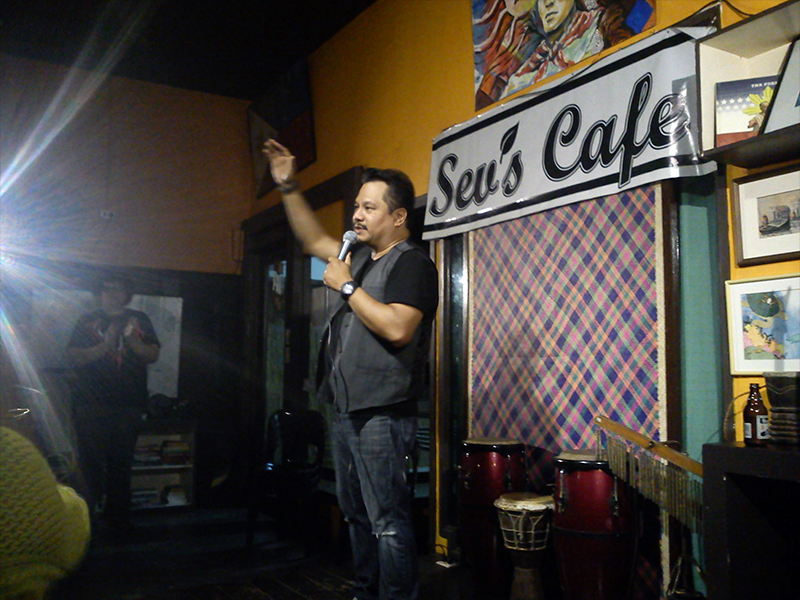
Rex Navarrete at Sev's Cafe in Malate, Manila

Rex Lasat Navarrete (born May 27, 1969, in Manila, Philippines) is a Filipino American comedian whose material is geared toward Filipino audiences.

== Early life ==
Sometime after his birth in 1969, his parents left the Philippines and immigrated to the United States, settling in Chicago. Navarrete, on the other hand, was raised by his grandparents in the provinces of Cavite and Batangas. He later reunited with his parents and his baby sister at the age of three. Eventually, the Navarrete family moved to South San Francisco, California where he spent the rest of his childhood.

== Education ==
Navarrete graduated from San Francisco State University, majoring in film and Asian American studies.

== Career ==
He started his career in 1989 with a performance at University of California Santa Cruz. He has since performed in many colleges and universities all over the world as well as various comedy clubs and festivals, including headlining a sold-out performance at The Warfield in San Francisco as well as the Wiltern LG in Los Angeles. As of December 2006, he has toured extensively throughout North America, Europe, Asia and Australia. These include performances in San Francisco, New York, Montreal, Manila, London, Dubai, Geneva, Hong Kong, Singapore, and Sydney.

In 2003, he released his first DVD entitled Hella Pinoy, in 2005, he released "Badass Madapaka" and in 2010, he released the DVD titled "Komik Organik".

In 2004–2005, he released a 13-episode series on MTV Philippines titled "Rex in the City".

In 2007, an animated series featuring Filipino-American characters known as The Nutshack, Navarrete would be voicing many of the characters.

== Discography ==
- Badly Browned (1998)
- Husky Boy (1999)
- Bastos (2001)

== Filmography ==
- Hella Pinoy (2003)
- Badass Madapaka (2005)
- Komik Organik: The Comedy of Rex Navarrete (2010)

=== Television ===
- Rex in the City on MTV Philippines.
- Rex Files: Pinoy Undercover segment on ABS-CBN's Stateside.
- The Nutshack (Jack Colero, Tito Dick and Cherry Pie)
- Lopez Tonight (2011)

=== Internet ===
- Maritess vs. the Superfriends
- SBC Packers
