= Blinding (novel) =

Novel by Mircea Cărtărescu

- Complete edition (Romanian)
- Author: Mircea Cărtărescu
- Original title: Orbitor
- Language: Romanian
- Publisher: Humanitas
- Publication date: 1996–2007
- Publication place: Romania
- English publication date: 2013
- Media type: Print
- Pages: 1479 pp (total pages)
- ISBN: 9732807237 (Vol. 1); ISBN 9735002507 (Vol. 2); ISBN 9735012057 (Vol. 3)

Blinding (Romanian: Orbitor) is a novel in three volumes by the Romanian writer Mircea Cărtărescu. It consists of the installments Aripa stângă ("The left wing") from 1996, Corpul ("The body") from 2002, and Aripa dreaptă ("The right wing") from 2007. An English translation of the first volume was published in October 2013.

== See also ==
- Romanian literature
