= Some Nights I Feel Like Walking =

2024 Filipino film by Petersen Vargas

- Theatrical release poster
- Directed by: Petersen Vargas
- Written by: Petersen Vargas
- Produced by: Jade Castro; Alemberg Ang
- Starring: Miguel Odron; Jomari Angeles; Argel Saycon; Tommy Alejandrino; Gold Aceron
- Cinematography: Russell Adam Morton
- Edited by: Daniel Hui
- Music by: Alyana Cabral; Moe Cabral
- Production companies: Giraffe Pictures; Momo Film Co; Origin8 Media; Volos Films
- Distributed by: Black Cap Pictures
- Release dates: November 13, 2024 (PÖFF); August 27, 2025 (Philippines)
- Running time: 103 minutes
- Country: Philippines
- Language: Filipino

Some Nights I Feel Like Walking is a 2024 independent road drama film written and directed Petersen Vargas. It stars Miguel Odron, Jomari Angeles, Argel Saycon, Tommy Alejandrino and Gold Aceron. The film portrays the journey of a group of street hustlers in Manila who fulfills a friend's dying wish to be brought to his hometown.

Vargas began writing the film in 2017 as a reflection of his life experiences and violence during the Duterte administration. After principal photography in Manila and Pangasinan, the film had its world premiere on the Tallinn Black Nights Film Festival on November 13, 2024, and its Philippine premiere on the QCinema RainbowQC Pride Film Festival on June 26, 2025. It received a limited theatrical release in the Philippines from August 27 to 31 of the same year. The film generally received positive reception for its cinematography of nighttime Manila.

== Plot ==
Miguelito, Bayani, Rush, and Uno are a group of friends in Manila who work as street hustlers and masseurs to survive. They search for clients and pickpocket to pay rent. Miguelito splits from the group to entertain a client, while the rest enter an erotic cinema.

Uno meets with a client who performs a three-way with a hustler who ran away from home named Zion. After the act, Bayani robs Zion in the bathroom, but Uno intervenes. Uno and Zion go to a mall to get bandages for Zion. While in the mall, Uno receives a distress call from Miguelito, and they rush out to find him. Zion finds him dying in a parking lot, who wishes to be returned to his hometown. Zion and Uno could not bring Miguelito to the hospital as Uno believes that he was drugged by his client.

Alongside Zion, Uno meets up with his friends and informs them of Miguelito's death and his dying wish. They agree to bring him to his hometown, although Bayani aggressively expresses his distrust of Zion. They take a taxicab and stop at a hotel to clean Miguelito's body and store it in a bag. Uno reflects with Zion on what could be his final resting place be, his want to stop sex work, and the fact that he does not own his body as a hustler, and narrates to Zion in the shower room a memory of his first interaction with Bayani.

They board a bus at midnight for a rural town named Painawa. (Note: lit. 'to rest' in the Pangasinan language.) They are stopped for carrying an oversized bag, but they are allowed to get in after Zion mentions that he is the son of a military general. After they arrive at Painawa, Rush, Bay, and Uno leave Zion in the bus for the town plaza. Zion eventually finds Uno in a grass field. Uno admits that he left the group to search for Zion and expresses his love for him, and they make out. They find themselves lost in the field and walk into a drag bar; they are generously provided a ride to the plaza, where a festival is happening.

Uno and Zion meet Rush and Bayani waiting by a town chapel. They find out that the house address they plan to visit is vacant, and the only relative of Miguelito is his brother, who is now a pastor. They find Miguelito's brother and tell him of Miguelito's death, hoping that he will provide Miguelito with a funeral. However, Miguelito's brother forsakes and rejects him as Miguelto left for Manila, him, to live a sinful life. The group becomes infuriated, and Bayani and Zion beat him. They escape and find themselves in the festival venue, where a fireplace is situated for festival offerings. As the group realizes that Miguelito's body has nowhere else to go, they reluctantly bring the bag into the fire.

== Cast ==
- Miguel Odron as Zion
- Jomari Angeles as Uno
- Argel Saycon as Bayani
- Tommy Alejandrino as Rush
- Gold Aceron as Miguelito
- Vic Robinson as Miguelito's brother

== Production ==
Some Nights I Feel Like Walking is based on the director's own youth experience in Manila and his search for identity. In an interview, Vargas describes his "rigid household" that includes military officers as a reference for creating the film. He also wanted to make a film about a queer boy who moved from the provinces to Manila and its influence on his identity. He mentions that the film is included in a line of Philippine queer film culture that includes films by Lino Brocka, Mel Chionglo, and Crisaldo Pablo. He also wrote the film as a reflection of the violence and the Philippine drug war during the Duterte administration.

Vargas began writing the film in 2017. The film, which was planned as a road movie with "youths on the margins of society", was still in pre-production by 2019. At that year, it was selected for Locarno Film Festival's Open Doors Hub, which is a mentoring and distributor networking program, and received a fund of US$150,000 (around ₱768,000 in 2019) from the Southeast Asian Fiction Film Lab Prize. It received support during the 2020 Cannes Cinéfondation Atelier, and was selected along with a film by Adolfo Alix Jr., Zsazsa Zaturnnah, and a documentary by Venice Atienza for the 18th Hong Kong Asia Film Financing Forum. Some Nights I Feel Like Walking also received funding from the Film Development Council of the Philippines and the Singapore Film Commission.

Production began in 2022. The production initially planned to cast street hustlers. However, they shifted to interviewing around 400 young people in Zoom to screen casting due to the pandemic. Composers Alyana and Moe Cabral, who worked on the film's music, incorporated Regine Velasquez's "Dadalhin" in the film. They also decided to include budots "[to cultivate] the feeling of being in Manila" and for the genre's being "local". Shooting began in Manila in the end of April 2023. Filming also occurred in Pangasinan.

== Release ==
The film first premiered at Tallinn Black Nights Film Festival on November 13, 2024, Golden Horse Film Festival and Awards on November 17, Singapore International Film Festival on December 2, and on Jogja-NETPAC Asian Film Festival on December 4, 2024.It was also screened at BFI Flare: London LGBTIQ+ Film Festival on March 26, 2025.

Its Philippine premiere was at the QCinema RainbowQC Pride Film Festival at Gateway Mall 2 on June 26 of the same year. Afterward, it was screened in Isetann Cinerama Recto on August 21. Massage chairs, karaoke machines, free sexual health services, live performances by macho dancers, and ukay-ukay stalls were set up in the screening venue. Grindr profiles of the film's characters were posted to promote the film and the screening. The film had a limited release nationwide from August 27 to 31. The film was also shortlisted by the Film Academy of the Philippines for the country's submission to the Best International Feature Film category at the 98th Academy Awards.

== Reception ==
Some Nights I Feel Like Walking won the Best Score Award in the 2024 Tallinn Black Nights Film Festival. It also won the Best Cnematography award at the 7th ASEAN International Film Festival and Awards. For the 2026 PMPC Star Awards for Movies, Ordon is a nominee for the New Actor of the Year. The three screenings at Gateway Mall for the QCinema RainbowQC Pride Film Festival were sold out on the first day, according to a report from Daily Tribune. A Philippine Daily Inquirer reporter wrote that several screenings at the film festival were also sold out.

Various reviews praised the film's cinematography and the lead cast performances. The film uses "a multi-sensory approach" to deliver its message, Rolling Stone's Don Jaucian argued. They described that its cinematography, such as its 20-minute one-take sequence at the end, "puts the audience in its place". Moreover, the "atmospheric and electronic" music and sound design captures "what it’s like to walk in Manila at night". Other reviewers also complimented the execution of the continuous shot and depiction of Manila's street at night. ABS-CBN News's Fred Hawson wrote that the cinematography and score strengthens Vargas's "bold storytelling", which uses dark humor and metaphors of marginalization experienced by the LGBTQ community. The film's nighttime setting and use of light and shadow reflects the theme of optimism; it is also a nuanced exploration of homosexuality, friendship, and struggles faced by Filipinos through the perspective of "gay 'alter' boys", The Philippine Star's Januar Junior Aguja wrote in a positive review.

Several reviewers criticized the film for its lack of narrative on the characters' backgrounds. Daily Tribune's Stephanie Mayo provided the film a negative review for its thin characterization and lack of impact, which they attributed to its slow-burn approach. They felt that the relationship between Uno and Zion suggests intimacy, but is "drowned in hazy moodiness". However, Aguja felt that the characters are grounded in reality. The Gay & Lesbian Review Worldwide's Jeremy Fox compared Zion and Uno's relationship, which the film explores, with 1991 film My Own Private Idaho. Meanwhile, Hawson opined that the film "felt like two films mashed up together", which depicts the urban decay of Manila and its underground sex trade and eventually becomes a "sentimental test of true friendship". The film's side plots "weighed down the story’s gravity" and seemed to exhibit melodrama for Manila Standard's Chong Ardivilla. Some Nights I Feel Like Walking initially adopts social realism to depict the lives of male sex workers caught between solidarity and violence, and shifts into a road movie, according to a review from Le Monde.
