= Why We Love Women =

Short story anthology by Mircea Cărtărescu

- First edition (Romanian)
- Author: Mircea Cărtărescu
- Original title: De ce iubim femeile
- Cover artist: Christian Schad, Self portrait, 1927
- Language: Romanian
- Publisher: Humanitas
- Publication date: 2004
- Publication place: Romania
- English publication date: 25 November 2011
- Media type: Print
- Pages: 170
- ISBN: 973-50-0869-6

Why We Love Women (Romanian: De ce iubim femeile) is a 2004 short story collection by the Romanian writer Mircea Cărtărescu. The twenty stories all have a female protagonist, and had previously been published in the magazine Elle. The book was published in English in 2011 through University of Plymouth Press.

== See also ==
- 2004 in literature
- Romanian literature
