= Cartea Românească =

Romanian publishing house

Interwar logo of Cartea Românească

Cartea Românească ("The Romanian Book") is a publishing house in Bucharest, Romania, founded in 1919. Disestablished by the communist regime in 1948, it was restored under later communism, in 1970, when it functioned as the official imprint of the Writers' Union of Romania (USR). The USR maintained its control of the business following the Romanian Revolution of 1989 and, from 2005 to 2016, shared the brand with a private company, Polirom. By 2016, this venture was noted for its authors' series, including in particular Gheorghe Crăciun and Octavian Soviany. The protocol with the USR was not renewed that year and, as of 2017, Cartea Românească is a brand shared between the USR and Editura Paralela 45.
