= List of Philippine films of 2026 =

This is an incomplete list of Filipino full-length and short films, both mainstream and independently produced, released in theaters, cinemas, and streaming services in 2026. Some films are in production but do not have definite release dates.

== Box office ==
The highest-grossing Filipino films released in 2026, by domestic box office gross revenue, are as follows:

† Background shading and † indicates films currently playing.
– is an entry film for Metro Manila Film Festival.
– is an entry film for Cinemalaya film festival.

Rank	Title	Distributor	Gross	Ref.
1	The Loved One	Viva Films	₱300 million	
2	Always Yours, Never Mine ^{†}	Star Cinema	₱121 million	
3	Pee Mak ^{†}	Viva Films	₱120 million	
4	Tayo sa Wakas	Star Cinema	₱110 million	
5	2 Valid IDs ^{†}	Cinemalaya	₱100 million	

== January–March ==
Opening		Title	Production company	Cast and crew	Ref.
J A N U A R Y	10	Breast Friends Forever	VMX	Easy Ferrer (director); Janno Gibbs, Astrid Lee, Audrey Avila, Karlo de Leon, Allen Legaspi	
J A N U A R Y	14	A Werewolf Boy	Viva Films	Crisanto B. Aquino (director); Rabin Angeles, Angela Muji	
J A N U A R Y	20	Sulutan	VMX / Potzu Bros Productions	Rodante Pajemna, Jr. (director); Astrid Lee, Karen Lopez, Alison Ross, Mark Dionisio, Mhack Morales	
J A N U A R Y	23	Angkinin Mo Ako	VMX / PCB Film Production	Topel Lee (director); Dara Lima, Cess Garcia, Juan Paolo Calma, Sheena Cole	
J A N U A R Y	30	Sirena	VMX / Infinity Talent Management	Bobby Bonifacio Jr. (director); Micaella Raz, Rica Gonzales, Van Allen Ong, Rash Flores	
F E B R U A R Y	4	Spring in Prague	Borracho Film Production	Lester Dimaranan (director); Paolo Gumabao, Sara Sandeva	
F E B R U A R Y	6	Sagaran	VMX / 3:16 Media Network	Sid Pascua (director); Ashley Lopez, Yda Manzano, Marco Gomez, Kurt Veneracion, Trish Gaden, Mon Mendoza	
F E B R U A R Y	11	The Loved One	Viva Films / Cornerstone Studios	Irene Villamor (director); Anne Curtis, Jericho Rosales	
F E B R U A R Y	13	Pansamantala	VMX / LDG Productions	King Abalos (director); Athena Red, Karen Lopez, Paula Santos, Rhian Rivera, Jhon Mark Marcia	
F E B R U A R Y	17	Tenement	VMX	Philip King (director); Marco Gallo, Arron Villaflor, Franki Russell, Yen Durano, Benz Sangalang	
F E B R U A R Y	18	The Lotto Winner	Mavx Productions, Inc.	RC delos Reyes (director); Albert Martinez, Sienna Stevens, Kylie Padilla	
F E B R U A R Y	18	Batang Paco	MiVida Productions Inc.	Rechie del Carmen (director); Gina Marissa Tagasa (screenplay); Empoy Marquez, Ai-Ai delas Alas	
F E B R U A R Y	20	Sex Trip	VMX	Lawrence Fajardo (director); Angeline Aril, Cheena Dizon, Victor Relosa, Audrey Avila, Van Allen Ong, Neil Tolentino	
F E B R U A R Y	25	Until She Remembers	Solar Pictures / Center Stage Productions	Brillante Mendoza (director/screenplay); Charo Santos-Concio, Barbie Forteza, Boots Anson-Rodrigo	
F E B R U A R Y	27	Warat	VMX / 3:16 Media Network	Christian Paolo Lat (director); Itan Rosales, Margaret Diaz, Marco Gomez, Christy Imperial	
M A R C H	4	Sisa	The IdeaFirst Company / October Train Films / Quantum Films / Cineko Productions / CMB Films / Forever Group	Jun Lana (director); Hilda Koronel, Eugene Domingo	
M A R C H	6	Sundutan	VMX / Potzu Bros Productions	Rodante Pajemna, Jr. (director); Allison Ross, Jade Viray, Zia Zamora, Mark Dionisio, Primo Angeles	
M A R C H	11	A Special Memory	Viva Films	Jerry Lopez-Sineneng (director); Ricky Lee (screenplay); Bella Padilla, Carlo Aquino	
M A R C H	13	Abot Langit	VMX / Infinity Talent Management	Topel Lee (director); Aliya Raymundo, JC Tan, Jio Yoshida, Zel Fernandez	
M A R C H	17	Vigilante	VMX	Christian Paolo Lat (director); Diego Loyzaga, Robb Guinto, Vince Rillon, Archie Adamos, Raffy Tejada	
M A R C H	18	Songs for Selina	Homeworkz Entertainment / Kinetek	Dean Rosen (director/screenplay); Rachel Alejandro, Mica Javier, Rachel Coates, Jay R	
M A R C H	18	Graduation Day	Bentria Production	Dante Balboa (director/screenplay); Elizabeth Oropesa, Jeric Gonzales	
M A R C H	18	Seeds of Peace	Lampyris Films	Rommel Galapia Ruiz (director); Zaijian Jaranilla	
M A R C H	20	Tuklas	VMX / Mizfitz	Dwight Buot (director); Skye Gonzaga, Keesha Falcon, Alexa Armecin, Chino Villaluna, Denzel Cruza	
M A R C H	22	Utoy Story	Camerrol Entertainment Productions	Errol Ropero (director); Drey Lampago, Ramon Christopher, Lotlot de Leon, Emilio Garcia, Liza Lorena, Rob Sy, Lance Raymundo, Gina Pareño, Bugoy Cariño, Buboy Villar, Zaijian Jaranilla, BJ Forbes	
M A R C H	23	Ang Bangkay	Philstagers Films	Vincent Tañada (director); Vince Tañada, Vean Olmedo, Johnrey Rivas, Lili Montelibano, Mercedes Cabral	
M A R C H	23	Pinikas	ØHouse Co. / Sunny Toys Entertainment	Cris Fuego (director); Angela Villarin, Jade Makawili, Kevin Reams	
M A R C H	23	Lanaya	Bipolaroid Film Fund / CMB Film Services	Clyde Capistrano (director); Shaun Salvador, Jun Nayra, Madeleine Nicolas, Rolando Inocencio	
M A R C H	23	Desperada	LDG Productions	Louie Ignacio (director); Robb Guinto, Yasser Marta, Mhack Morales, Sue Prado, Mercedes Cabral	
M A R C H	23	Sweet Escape	RR Entertainment Production	Rommel Ricafort (director); Arci Muñoz, Kang Donggun, William Lorenzo, Matet de Leon, Ayeesha Cervantes	
M A R C H	23	All About Her	3:16 Media Network	Joel Lamangan (director); Tony Labrusca, Yuki Sonoda, Itan Rosales, Marco Gomez, Angelica Cervantes, Kelley Day	
M A R C H	25	Pater Noster	Viva Films / LGK Films	Moutaz Kotrob (director/screenplay); Raymond Diamzon (screenplay); Arron Villaflor, Archi Adamos, Kayley Carrigan	
M A R C H	27	Maid's Obesession	VMX	Ronald Batallones (director); Cheena Dizon, Queenie de Mesa, Ardy Raymundo, Je-Ann Fortich, James Vasquez	
M A R C H	31	Scorpio Nights 4	VMX / Mabolo Drive Pictures	Bobby Bonifacio Jr. (director); Apphle Celso, Sahara Bernales, Albie Casiño, Marco Mora	

Color key

- – a Sinag Maynila entry film

== April–June ==
Opening		Title	Production company	Cast and crew	Ref.
A P R I L	4	I Fell, It's Fine	WIDE International	Sigrid Andrea Bernardo (director); Glaiza De Castro, Rhian Ramos	
A P R I L	4	Wonderful Nightmare	Viva Films	RC delos Reyes (director); Kim Molina, Jerald Napoles	
A P R I L	4	Stepdaddy	VMX / LDG Productions	Christopher Novabos (director); King Abalos (screenplay); Astrid Lee, Christy Imperial, Jamila Obispo, Jhon Mark Marcia	
A P R I L	9	18th Rose	Netflix / Clever Minds Inc.	Dolly Dulu (director/screenplay); John Carlo Pacala (screenplay); Xyriel Manabat, Kyle Echarri	
A P R I L	10	Sawsawan	VMX	Rodante Pajemna, Jr. (director); Amor Lapus, Karen Lopez, Rhian Rivera, Allen Legazpi, Aeron Henry Cruz	
A P R I L	15	Huwag Kang Titingin	GMA Pictures / Mentorque Productions	Frasco Mortiz (director); Sofia Pablo, Allen Ansay, Marco Masa, Charlie Fleming, Michael Sager, Kira Balinger, Josh Ford, Sean Lucas, Anthony Constantino, Shuvee Etrata	
A P R I L	15	Umbag	GBH Studios / MDInternational Multimedia Productions	John Ad Castillo (director); Marie D., LJ Ramos, Miguel Ramirez	
A P R I L	17	Tayuan 2	VMX / PCB Film Production	Topel Lee (director); Ashley Lopez, Marco Mora, Dara Lima	
A P R I L	22	3 Words	Black Cap Pictures	Fifth Solomon (director); Loisa Andalio, Ronnie Alonte, Queenay Mercado, Kych Minemoto, Kate Alejandrino, Renzie Aguilar, Angel Raymundo	
A P R I L	24	Kesong Puti	VMX / Potzu Bros Productions	Rodante Pajemna, Jr. (director); Apphle Celso, Rinoa Halili, Van Allen Ong, Aya Fernandez, Mark Dionisio, Eddison Fernandez	
A P R I L	28	Barurot 2	VMX / Pelikula Indiopendent	Quiel Dela Cruz (director); Margaret Diaz, Dara Lima, Victoria Nash, Shannon Sizon, Aerol Carmelo, JC Tan	
A P R I L	28	Young Blood	iWant / Mavx Productions, Inc.	Rember Gelera (director); Jaime Fabregas, Bodjie Pascua, Freddie Webb, Argel Saycon, Gold Aceron, Aljon Mendoza	
A P R I L	29	She Who Must Not Be Named	Solar Pictures / Solar Studios, Inc / Oh Aye Productions Inc.	Christopher Novabos (director); Lawrence Nicodemus (screenplay); Francine Diaz, Seth Fedelin	
M A Y	1	Check In	VMX / PCB Film Production	Christopher Novabos (director); King Abalos (screenplay); Aliya Raymundo, Anya Austria, Victor Relosa, Chester Grecia	
M A Y	5	Pasakalye	VMX	Roman Perez Jr. (director); Marco Gumabao, Andrew Muhlach, Denise Esteban, Angelica Hart, Jeric Raval	
M A Y	6	Almost Us	Regal Entertainment / Project 8 Projects	Dan Villegas (director); Miguel Sevilla, Juvy Galamiton (screenplays); JM Ibarra, Fyang Smith	
M A Y	8	Scissors	VMX / The Good Bois Film Production	Christopher Novabos (director); Rhian Rivera, Sandra Dela Cruz, Allison Ross, Ghion Espinosa	
M A Y	13	Midnight Girls	Warner Bros. Pictures / TJAV Productions Inc.	Irene Villamor (director); Sanya Lopez, Loisa Andalio, Jane Oineza, Jodi Sta Maria	
M A Y	15	Hayok	VMX / PCB Film Production	Topel Lee (director); Apphle Celso, Nico Locco, Stephanie Raz, Chester Grecia	
M A Y	22	Monay	VMX / The Good Bois Film Production	Christopher Novabos (director); Sahara Bernales, Rash Flores, Kim Yashii, Sahil Khan	
M A Y	27	Tayo sa Wakas	Star Cinema / ABS-CBN Studios	Cathy Garcia-Sampana (director); Vanessa R. Valdez (screenplay); Donny Pangilinan, Belle Mariano	
M A Y	29	Palitan 2	VMX / Real to Reel Studios	Rodante Pajemna, Jr. (director); Margaret Diaz, Angela Morena, Victor Relosa, Juan Paulo Calma	
J U N E	3	Love, Ngo	Viva Films / VinCentiments	Darryl Yap (director/screenplay); Jerald Napoles, Candy Pangilinan, Gina Alajar, Malupiton	
J U N E	5	Scandal Queen	VMX / PCB Film Production	Topel Lee (director); Karen Lopez, Nico Locco, Rhian Rivera, Dimple Rubia	
J U N E	9	Sugar Mommy	VMX / The Good Bois Film Production	Christopher Novabos (director); King Abalos (screenplay); Jamilla Obispo, Ashley Lopez, Aerol Carmelo, Rash Flores	
J U N E	10	Project Baby	Regal Entertainment, Inc.	Eric Quizon (director); Sue Ramirez, Rico Blanco	
J U N E	12	Kikirot Kirot	VMX / Potzu Bros Productions	Rodante Pajemna Jr. (director); Skye Gonzaga, Rinoa Halili, Mark Dionisio, Mark Niño, Margaret Sison	
J U N E	17	Home Along da Riles: Da Reunion	Riles Productions / TJAV Productions Inc.	Boy 2 Quizon (director); Nova Villa, Claudine Barretto, Vandolph, Boy 2 Quizon, Maybelyn dela Cruz, Smokey Manaloto, Pepe Herrera, Cita Astals	
J U N E	19	Latina	VMX / Real to Reel Studios	King Abalos (director); Athena Red, Shalanie de Vera, Chester Grecia, Mhack Morales	
J U N E	24	A Quiet Bloom	Bisayaflix / Version 510 Productions / Wolfpack Productions	Drae Cerna, Yamie Cerna (directors); Victoria Ingram, Leigh Sunga	
J U N E	24	First Light	Clou Media Productions / Majella Productions / Good Thing Productions	James J. Robinson (director/screenplay); Ruby Ruiz, Kare Adea, Maricel Soriano, Emmanuel Santos, Rez Cortez, Soliman Cruz, Kidlat Tahimik	
J U N E	24	Drags to Riches	Cornerstone Studios	Victor Villanueva (director); Christian Bables, Iñigo Pascual, Elijah Canlas	
J U N E	26	The Cheating Wife	VMX / Real to Reel Studios	Mikko Baldoza (director); Allison Ross, Cess Garcia, Vince Rillon	
J U N E	30	Hibla 2	VMX / PCB Film Production	Topel Lee (director); Aliya Raymundo, Margaret Diaz, Albie Casiño, Ghion Espinosa	

== July–September ==
Opening		Title	Production company	Cast and crew	Ref.
J U L Y	3	Helena	VMX / Marvex Studios Inc.	Omar Deroca (director); Jenn Rosa, Lea Bernabe, Van Allen Ong, Aya Fortes, Jhon Mark Marcia, Basti Flores, Jio Yoshida	
J U L Y	10	Siping	VMX / The Good Bois Film Production	Christopher Novabos (director); Shannon Sizon, Cheena Dizon, Juan Paulo Calma, Chad Solano	
J U L Y	17	Lunok	VMX / Five 2 Seven Entertainment Production	Rainerio Yamson II (director); Astrid Lee, Allison Ross, Dimple Rubia, Anthony Davao, Mhack Morales	
J U L Y	24	Booking	VMX / Potzu Bros Productions	Pongs Leonardo (director); Margaret Diaz, Denise Esteban, Nico Locco, Gboy Pablo, John Carl	
J U L Y	31	Creampie	VMX / Potzu Bros Productions	Rodante Pajemna, Jr. (director); Christy Imperial, Angel Castro, Margaret Sison, Mark Dionisio, Vince Rillon	
A U G U S T	5	Rosario	Viva Films / Studio Viva	Roni Benaid (director); Aubrey Caraan, Lance Carr, Jairus Aquino, Meg Imperial, Yumi Garcia	
A U G U S T	6	2 Valid IDs	Cinemalaya Foundation	Ma-an Asuncion-Dagñalan (director); Marietta Subong, Joey Marquez, Zaijian Jaranilla	
A U G U S T	6	A.ni.mal	Cinemalaya Foundation	Dustin Celestino (director); Maxine Ignacio, Frances Makil-Ignacio, Jojit Lorenzo	
A U G U S T	6	Ganggang	Cinemalaya Foundation	JL Burgos (director); Raine dela Cruz, Kenneth Vincent Mendoza, Don Rishmond Cerbito, Prince España	
A U G U S T	6	Hand of God	Cinemalaya Foundation	Mark Duane Angos (director); Ruru Madrid, Iza Calzado, Ronnie Lazaro, Sue Ramirez	
A U G U S T	6	Kaka Sa Yawan	Cinemalaya Foundation	Alpha Habon (director); Bryce Nicolo Mercader, Beaver Magtalas, Luis Alandy, Nikki Valdez	
A U G U S T	6	Mag-iina (The Mothering)	Cinemalaya Foundation	Giancarlo Abrahan (director); Janine Gutierrez, Lucas Andalio, Cherry Pie Picache, Agot Isidro, Ness Roque, Jackie Lou Blanco	
A U G U S T	6	Status: Rejected	Cinemalaya Foundation	Vahn Lenard Pascual (director); Ruby Ruiz, Alessandra de Rossi, Beverly Salviejo, Yani Villarosa	
A U G U S T	6	Tayo Lang Ang Nakakaalam	Cinemalaya Foundation	David Corpuz (director); Martin del Rosario, Yayo Aguila, Miguel Ordon, Epy Quizon	
A U G U S T	6	Tirik (To Set Upright)	Cinemalaya Foundation	May-i Guia-Padilla (director); Rocco Nacino, Floyd Tena	
A U G U S T	7	Ang Modista	VMX / PCB Film Production	Ronald Battalones (director); Micaella Raz, Kim Yashii, Mon Confiado, Pablo Palma	
A U G U S T	13	Ganito, Ganyan, Ganoon	Netflix / Unitel Straight Shooters	Cholo H. Laurel (director/screenplay); Cody Abad, Shania Sumergido (screenplays); Jodi Sta. Maria, Agot Isidro	
A U G U S T	14	Haplos ni Milagros	VMX / LDG Productions	Christopher Novabos (director); Vern Kaye, Jhon Mark Marcia, Anya Austria, Honey Abe	
A U G U S T	19	HB2ME	Mavx Productions	Veronica Velasco (director); John Arcilla, Elijah Canlas	
A U G U S T	19	Senior Moments	A&S Production	Neal Buboy Tan (director); Nova Villa, Noel Trinidad, Tessie Tomas	
A U G U S T	21	Apoy sa Ibabaw, Apoy sa Ilalim	VMX / Marvex Studios Inc.	Omar Deroca (director); Rhian Rivera, Itan Rosales, Julianne Richards, Rash Flores	
A U G U S T	26	Ang Pinakamasarap na Pares sa Balat ng Lupa	Viva Films / Studio Viva	Raynier F. Brizuela (director); Jerald Napoles, Pepe Herrera	
A U G U S T	26	Filipiñana	Film4 / Potocol / Ossian International / Epicmedia / Easy Riders Films / Idle Eye	Rafael Manuel (director/screenplay); Jorrybell Agoto, Carmen Castellanos, Teroy Guzman, Carlos Siguion-Reyna, Isabel Sicat, Nour Hooshmand	
A U G U S T	28	Sex Drive 2	VMX / Styled by Ashley C.	Bobby Bonifacio, Jr. (director); Apphle Celso, Angel Castro, Benz Sanggalang, Juan Paulo Calma	
S E P T E M B E R	2	Saving Cherry	Regal Entertainment	Ivan Andrew Payawal (director); Barbie Forteza, Mika Salamanca, AC Bonifacio, Mikee Quintos, Sassa Gurl	
S E P T E M B E R	2	The Guardian	Viva Films / GV Labs / Will Studios / Parallax Studio / Robosheep Studios / Ovation Productions	Jeong Jang-hwan (director); Nam Woo-hyun, Wilbert Ross, Park Eun-hye, Yassi Pressman, Han Jae-seok, Eric Ejercito, Heart Ryan, Fatima Anonuevo, Ashtine Olviga	
S E P T E M B E R	4	Babae sa Butas	VMX	Rhance Añonuevo-Cariño (director); Vern Kaye, Skye Gonzaga, Arah Alonzo, Karen Lopez, Van Allen Ong	
S E P T E M B E R	9	Life After You	Viva Films / The Reel Station Studios	Marla Ancheta (director); Maricel Soriano, Bela Padilla	
S E P T E M B E R	9	Poon	Banana Entertainment Inc. / C-Frame Production	Adolfo Alix Jr. (director); Ronaldo Valdez, Gina Pareño, Jaclyn Jose, Lotlot de Leon, Ara Mina, Janice de Belen, Allen Dizon, JC de Vera, Will Ashley, Althea Ablan, Kelvin Miranda, Joao Constancia	
S E P T E M B E R	11	Spit or Swallow	VMX / 4Blues Productions / The Big Shot Productions	Sigrid Polon (director); Rinoa Halili, Kim Yashii, Ghion Espinosa	
S E P T E M B E R	16	Edjop	Warner Bros. Pictures / Open Water Productions / The Mad Goats Inc.	Katski Flores (director/screenplay); Jade Castro (screenplay); Elijah Canlas, Jodi Sta. Maria	
S E P T E M B E R	18	Desperada	VMX / LDG Productions	Louie Ignacio (director); Robb Guinto, Yasser Marta, Mhack Morales, Julianne Richards	
S E P T E M B E R	23	Apol of my Ai	Puregold	Toph Nazareno (director); Zanjoe Marudo, Rochelle Pangilinan, Zion Cruz	
S E P T E M B E R	23	Beast	Puregold	Lawrence Fajardo (director); John Arcilla	
S E P T E M B E R	23	Mono No Aware	Puregold	BC Amparado (director); Juan Karlos	
S E P T E M B E R	23	Multwoh: Patay na Patay Sa'yo	Puregold	Rodina Singh (director); Sassa Gurl, Joao Constancia	
S E P T E M B E R	23	Patay Gutom (Dead Hungry)	Puregold	Carl Joseph Papa and Ian Pangilinan (directors); Khalil Ramos	
S E P T E M B E R	23	Stuck on You	Puregold	Mikko Baldoza (director); Xyriel Manabat, River Joseph	
S E P T E M B E R	23	Wantawsan	Puregold	Joseph Abello (director); Joross Gamboa	
S E P T E M B E R	23	Plump Blossom	Kapitana Entertainment Media	Rossana Hwang (director/screenplay); Candice Tan, Don Puno, Gutch Gutierrez, Chad Williams, Thunderson Tan, Yeng Her, Audie Gemora	
S E P T E M B E R	25	Isla	VMX / Potzu Bros Productions	Rodante Pajemna Jr. (director); Margaret Diaz, Shannon Sizon, Mayumi de Vera, Yda Manzano, Mark Anthony Fernandez, Marco Mora, Mark Dionisio	
S E P T E M B E R	30	Always Yours, Never Mine	Star Cinema	Cathy Garcia-Sampana (director); Joshua Garcia, Julia Barretto	

Color key

- – a Cinemalaya Independent Film Festival entry film.
- – a Puregold CinePanalo Film Festival entry film

== October–December ==
Opening		Title	Production company	Cast and crew	Ref.
O C T O B E R	7	Mantsa	Dragons Talent Management and Productions	Louie Ignacio (director); Pilar Pilapil, Gelli de Belen, Khai Flores, Shira Tweg	
O C T O B E R	9	My Hentai Girlfriend	VMX / LDG Productions	Bobby Bonifacio Jr. (director); Ashley Lopez, Gold Aceron, Akira Takamura, Nico Valdez, Roxanne de Vera	
O C T O B E R	14	Pee Mak	Viva Films / Studio Viva	Victor Villanueva (director); Wilbert Ross, Bea Binene	
O C T O B E R	16	Dutdot	VMX / PCB Film Production	Christopher Novabos (director); Aliya Raymundo, Krista Miller, Chester Grecia, Nico Valdez, Sheena Cole, John Carl	
O C T O B E R	21	The Fisher	TEN17P / Black Cap Pictures	Paul Soriano (director); Mon Confiado, Eula Valdez, Heaven Peralejo	
O C T O B E R	23	Sukdulan	VMX / The Big Shot Productions / 4Blues Productions	Lawrence Fajardo (director); Shalanie de Vera, Benz Sangalang, Chad Solano, Sandra Dela Cruz, Ralph Christian Engle	
O C T O B E R	28	He's Dating a Bold Star	NKO Film Productions	Niokz Arcega (director); Malupiton, Analyn Barro	
O C T O B E R	28	Red Crown	GMA Pictures / Chavit Singson Production	Dominic Zapata (director); Shuvee Etrata, Michelle Dee, Faith da Silva, Bianca Manalo, Sanya Lopez	
O C T O B E R	28	VHS (Viva Horror Stories)	Viva Films / VinCentiments	Darryl Yap (director/screenplay); McCoy de Leon, Ella Cruz, Sarah Labhati, Kit Thompson, Sachzna Laparan	
O C T O B E R	30	Threesome	VMX / Potzu Bros Productions	Rodante Pajemna Jr. (director); Angel Castro, Rhian Rivera, Shiena Yu, Vince Rillon	
N O V E M B E R	4	Buddy	Mavx Productions	Lucky Blanco (director); Tin Badillo-Novicio (screenplay); Michael de Mesa, Benjie Paras, Elisse Joson, Empoy Marquez, Elijah Canlas, EA Guzman, Shaira Diaz	
N O V E M B E R	6	MILF	VMX	Rodante Pajemna Jr. (director); Maui Taylor, Katya Santos, Sheree Bautista, Gwen Garci, Ashley Lopez, Itan Rosales, Mauro Salas	
N O V E M B E R	11	Unfiltered	i.Syoot Multimedia Production	Hanz Florentino (director); Jeffrey Ocampo (screenplay); Kai Montinola, JP Cabrera, Dennah Bautista, Venice Bismonte	
N O V E M B E R	11	Remember	Star Cinema / APT Entertainment / AgostoDos Pictures / Regal Entertainment	Mae Cruz-Alviar (director), Dingdong Dantes, Marian Rivera	
N O V E M B E R	13	Labas Pasok	VMX / Infinity Talent Management	Bobby Bonifacio Jr. (director); Jenn Rosa, Lea Bernabe, Mark Dionisio, Ghion Espinosa	
N O V E M B E R	13	Ella Arcangel: Awit ng Pangil at Kuko	GMA Pictures / Twenty Manila / Haliya Publishing / Rocketsheep Studio	Mervin Malonzo (director/screenplay); Julius Villanueva (screenplay); Bianca Umali, Michael V.	
N O V E M B E R	18	Andoy	Wonderlast Films	Mark Putian (director); Cedrick Juan, Jennica Garcia, Albie Casino, Paolo Gumabao, Angelica Lao, Aya Fernandez, Victor Relosa, Harly Daria	
N O V E M B E R	20	Laplap	VMX / Infinity Talent Management	Dado C. Lumibao (director); Apphle Celso, Rinoa Halili, Aerol Carmelo, Marco Mora	
N O V E M B E R	25	Laya	Rein Entertainment / CreatePH Films	Sigrid Andrea Bernardo (director/screenplay), Andrea Brillantes, JC Santos, Anthony Jennings	
N O V E M B E R	27	Gamitan 2	VMX / PCB Film Production	Topel Lee (director); Margaret Diaz, Joy Basa, Dimple Rubia, Victor Relosa, Gold Aceron	
D E C E M B E R	4	Tigang	VMX	Cara Gonzales (director); Aliya Raymundo, Sean de Guzman, Shannon Sizon, Ghion Espinosa	
D E C E M B E R	9	40 Days	LVD Management Corp.	Luisito Lagdameo (director;) Dina Bonnevie, Lotlot de Leon, Elizabeth Oropesa, Perla Bautista, Snooky Serna	
D E C E M B E R	11	Dirty Confexxions	VMX	Roman Perez Jr. (director); Angel Castro, Astrid Lee, Cheena Dizon, Nico Locco	
D E C E M B E R	16	Romano	Redemptio Studios	JL Burgos (director); JC Santos, Albert Martinez, Cris Villanueva	
D E C E M B E R	18	Congrats	Regal Entertainment, Heaven's Best Entertainment	Joey De Guzman (director); Angeli Bayani, Lovi Poe, Yassi Pressman, JM Ibarra	
D E C E M B E R	18	Warak	VMX	King Abalos (director); Shalanie de Vera, Paolo Gumabao, Victor Relosa	
D E C E M B E R	25	2nd Miracle in Cell No. 7	Viva Films	Nuel Naval (director); Aga Muhlach, Xia Vigor, Jodi Sta. Maria	
D E C E M B E R	25	A Perfect Marriage	Quantum Films	Dan Villegas (director); Kim Chiu, Paulo Avelino	
D E C E M B E R	25	Amir	GMA Pictures / GMA Public Affairs / Brightburn Entertainment	Zig Dulay (director); Argus Aspiras, Dennis Trillo, Will Ashley, Glaiza de Castro	
D E C E M B E R	25	Haunted Carnival	Regal Entertainment	Joey de Guzman (director); John Arcilla, James Reid, Julia Barretto, Fyang Smith, Maricel Soriano	
D E C E M B E R	25	Little Hope	Lonewolf Films / Solar Studios	Benedict Mique (director); Yassi Pressman, Pepe Herrera, Cailey Magno	
D E C E M B E R	25	Los Salvajes Bravos	Jesuit Communications Foundation	Paolo Dy (director); Romnick Sarmienta, Ruru Madrid	
D E C E M B E R	25	Seeds of Peace: The Life of Fr. Rhoel D. Gallardo, CMF	Superior of the Filipino Corporation of Claretian Fathers, Inc.	Rommel Ruiz (director); Zaijian Jaranilla	
D E C E M B E R	25	The Greatest Showdown	Star Cinema / The IdeaFirst Company / MZet Productions / APT Entertainment	Jun Lana (director); Vic Sotto, Vice Ganda	

Color key

- – a QCinema International Film Festival entry film
- – a Sine Sindak entry film.
- – a Metro Manila Film Festival entry film
