= Chino Liu =

Filipino influencer (born 1995)

- Born: Seth Simon Liu; November 22, 1995 (age 30)
- Other name: Tita Krissy Achino; Chino Liu; Aling Cely
- Education: Colegio de San Juan de Letran
- Occupations: Content creator; comedian; content creator
- Years active: 2017–present

YouTube information
- Channel: Tita Krissy Achino
- Years active: 2017–2023
- Genres: Comedy; vlog; travel
- Subscribers: 1.3 million
- Views: 46.2 million
- Last updated: January 2026

Seth Simon Liu (born November 22, 1995), also known as Chino Liu or Tita Krissy Achino, is a Filipino influencer, actor and comedian who impersonates former actress Kris Aquino. He is also a content creator who makes various vlogs and is part of the group Team Payaman, led by Cong TV.

== Early life ==
Seth Simon Liu was born on November 22, 1995, in the Philippines. He earned a Bachelor of Arts in Communication from Colegio de San Juan de Letran, graduating in 2017. After completing his studies, he began creating content online, first trying out various formats before eventually concentrating on character-based impersonations.

== Career ==
Liu gained wider public attention in 2017 when a video of him voicing navigation prompts for the app Waze using impressions of various Filipino celebrities circulated online. His impersonation of television host and actress Kris Aquino drew particular notice and later developed into his most recognizable persona known as "Tita Krissy Achino". In interview with the Philippine Daily Inquirer, Liu said he chose to concentrate on the Aquino impression because of their similar speech patterns and natural delivery.

In the same year, Liu started a YouTube channel using the name "Tita Krissy Achino", while still taking part in television programs. His reach expanded following an appearance on the variety show Wowowin, where host Willie Revillame openly praised his impersonation during a phone call segment with Aquino.

Liu became a member of the content creator group Team Payaman, having met its founder Cong TV through a multi-channel network under ABS-CBN. He became part of the group as a host and collaborator, taking part in their events and online projects. His YouTube channel continued to gain followers and reached one million subscribers in 2020.

In 2021, Liu introduced a makeup collaboration with Viy Cortez under ViyLine Cosmetics, featuring a lip and cheek tint associated with his character "Aling Cely". The project marked one of his early business ventures outside content creation.

== Personal life ==
In 2021, he bought his first car a Geely Okavango, calling it a reward for his years of work in content creation. He also mentioned that fellow vloggers Cong TV and Cortez encouraged him to make the purchase.

Liu has spoken openly about incidents affecting his personal safety, including a failed burglary attempt at his residence in Parañaque, as well as being a victim of an accommodation scam during a family trip to Tagaytay.

== Filmography ==
=== Film ===
Year	Title	Role
2018	Fantastica	Kris Aquino Impersonator
2021	Kuta	Krissy Achino
2022	An Inconvenient Love	Ben 1
2024	Some Nights I Feel Like Walking	Pares Eater
2025	Postmortem	Chino

=== Television ===
Year	Title	Role
2019	Pepito Manaloto	Peach Capulong
2019–2021	Daddy's Gurl	Krissy / Kris Capeno
2020	My Day	Tita Krizzy
2022	Magpakailanman	Bambi
2025	Prinsesa ng City Jail	Raider (uncredited)
