= Malupiton =

Filipino entertainer (born 1998)

- Born: Joel Ravanera; May 22, 1998 (age 28); Angono, Rizal, Philippines
- Other names: Cash-G, Bossing
- Education: Paliparan National High School
- Occupations: Vlogger; comedian; actor; rapper
- Years active: 2020–present
- Spouse: Joy Ancheta (m. 2025)
- Children: 1

YouTube information
- Channel: MALUPITON OFFICIAL
- Years active: 2020–present
- Genres: Vlog; Comedy
- Subscribers: 1.02 million
- Views: 207 million
- Last updated: June 1, 2025

Joel Ravanera (born May 22, 1998), known professionally as Malupiton, is a Filipino internet personality, actor and entertainer. Known for his witty and relatable content in social media platforms such as Facebook, TikTok, and YouTube. Ravanera appeared in the films Love, Ngo and He's Dating a Bold Star, both released in 2026.

== Early life ==
Joel Ravanera was born in Angono, Rizal, but moved to Dasmariñas, Cavite, one month after his birth. He graduated from Paliparan National High School. Ravanera initially aspired to become a lawyer, but financial constraints prevented him from pursuing a legal education.

Ravanera took on various jobs, including selling turon, electronics, and passport covers, and working as a waiter, before becoming a content creator. However, a nightclub manager later persuaded him to consider working as a macho dancer, reportedly enticing him by showcasing the cars owned by other employees.

== Career ==
In 2020, during the height of the COVID-19 pandemic, Ravanera began uploading humorous videos under his name "Malupiton" with his group of content creators known as "Kolokoys TV".

In 2022, Ravanera and his fellow content creators from "Kolokoys TV", appeared on the Philippine game show Family Feud.

In one of his livestream episodes on YouTube, Lincoln Velasquez, also known as Cong TV, responded to suggestions from viewers to collaborate with Ravanera with his group, which previously appeared alongside Team Payaman during the Team Payaman Fair held in December 2023. Cong TV admitted that Ravanera is one of the creators he watches, expressing great amusement at his content.

In December 2024, he set to star in his debut film titled He's Dating A Bold Star, with actress Analyn Barro as his leading lady. The film was released on October 28, 2026.

In 2025, he made a cameo appearance in the music video for SB19's single "DUNGKA!". In the same year, Actor Leandro Baldemor expressed admiration for Ravanera after working with him on a film project. Baldemor made a special appearance in a movie starring under his online username Malupiton, which is reportedly set to be released on Netflix. The film also features Filipino actress Aleck Bovick in the cast. In August, Ravanera was tapped to play in a celebrity exhibition game of the Pilipinas United 3x3 League. Together with De La Salle University guard Kean Baclaan and actor David Licauco, Ravanera participated in an exhibition match against vlogger Rendon Labador's team. Ravanera made a special surprise cameo appearance in the hit ABS-CBN crime-thriller teleserye Sins of the Father during its highly anticipated finale week.

== Style ==
Ravanera is known for his "good vibes" humor and comedic skits. He became known in 2024 through videos with the content creator group Kolokoys TV. His skits use common situations. He uses casual language with street slang and repeated phrases, and sometimes uses simple props. Profanity can appear in some videos. Many of his videos show ordinary experiences, such as small jobs, daily struggles, and common frustrations. Signature phrases like "Aray ko!" (transl. That hurts!) and "Bossing! Kamusta ang buhay-buhay?" (transl. Boss! How's life going?), or sometimes shortened to "Boss!" are frequently featured in his videos.

== Controversy ==
During a live interview on the Maharlika Pilipinas Basketball League (MPBL), Ravanera, accidentally used the profanity "Puking-ina n'yo, boy!" (transl. You sons of bitch, boy!) while greeting viewers, which caught the audience by surprise. Following the incident, the league banned him from participating. Ravanera later explained that he did not intend for the incident to happen and believed the interview was only for online content. He said no one told him that the segment was airing live and that they genuinely thought it was just for sports pages or similar platforms. He added that he had no idea the interview was being shown on television and watched by many people. According to him, the words slipped out before he realized the situation, and he apologized, saying he was sorry for what happened.

== Personal life ==
In December 2024, Ravanera announced his engagement to his longtime girlfriend, Joy Ancheta. They were married in 2025.

== Filmography ==
=== Film ===
Year	Title	Role	Ref.
2026	Love, Ngo	Webster	
2026	He's Dating A Bold Star	Jeboy	

=== Television ===
Year	Title	Role	Ref.
2022	Family Feud	Contestant	
2025	Sins of the Father	Cameo	

=== Music videos ===
Year	Title	Artist	Role	Ref.
2025	"DUNGKA!"	SB19	Cameo	
