= Ang Babaeng Walang Pakiramdam =

- Directed by: Darryl Yap
- Written by: Darryl Yap
- Produced by: Vincent del Rosario III; Veronique del Rosario-Corpus
- Starring: Kim Molina
- Cinematography: Rain Yamson
- Edited by: Vincent Asis; Noah Tonga; Nelson Villamayor
- Music by: Emerzon Texon
- Production companies: Viva Films; VinCentiments
- Distributed by: Viva Films
- Release date: June 11, 2021
- Running time: 83 minutes
- Country: Philippines
- Language: Filipino

Ang Babaeng Walang Pakiramdam (lit. 'The Woman Who Cannot Feel') is a 2021 Philippine comedy film written and directed by Darryl Yap. It starring Kim Molina as the title role. It premiered on June 11, 2021, through Viva Entertainment's online streaming platform Vivamax.

== Summary ==
Anastacia "Tasha" Quingquing is a woman with congenital insensitivity to pain, a rare disease that makes her incapable of feeling physical pain and pleasure. She works in a pharmaceutical company and asks her friends, Eric and Au, to go on vacation with her, but they have a lot of excuses that make them unable to join her. After a party with her friends, Tasha stumbles upon a small store. While Tasha and the vendor are talking, Ngongo, a man with a cleft palate, tries to buy an item from the store. Since both women cannot clearly understand Ngongo, he tries to sing the alphabet song to spell the item he wants to buy. The vendor says this has always been their form of communication whenever she cannot understand him.

When Ngongo leaves the store, the vendor tells Tasha that Ngongo's father died of cancer and his sister, who lives in Bohol, also has the disease. Ngongo has always wanted to return to Bohol to visit his sister, but he was recently fired from his job in a call center company due to his condition. Realizing that they both want to go to Bohol, Tasha enlists Ngongo to accompany her on an all-expense paid vacation because the province is included in her itinerary. The duo goes to Enchanted Kingdom in Laguna, Bohol, and Pampanga, trying risky activities such as thrill rides, bungee jumping, and ultralight flying. Even though the activities are very fun, Tasha shows no emotion all throughout the vacation. Even when she sustains injuries, she doesn't notice them.

During their vacation, they both learn more about each other. In addition to not feeling pain and pleasure, Tasha also doesn't feel or react emotionally because of her upbringing. Her mother always told her that showing emotion is a weakness and forbade her from crying. Tasha also learns more about Ngongo's family and the wishes he made when he was little. Ngongo wished he would die when he was younger because his parents felt helpless when other children would bully him due to his condition. Tasha realized that her mother didn't want to see her sad because she loves her, which is the main reason why her mother stopped her from showing emotion.

Before their vacation ends, Ngongo tries to tell Tasha how he feels about her. He communicates with her like how he did the first night they met. Ngongo sings the alphabet song to spell "I LOVE U," but before he reaches the last letter, Tasha rejects him. On the way back to the city, Ngongo tells Tasha that her condition doesn't matter to him and he still wants to give their relationship a try. Tasha ignores him, stating that she still doesn't feel anything. During their conversation, they stumble upon a house fire. Tasha rushes out of the car and enters the burning house to save a child trapped inside, her condition preventing her from feeling the heat and smoke. She faints after saving the child and is immediately rushed to the hospital. Despite her insistence that she is fine, the doctor tells her that she must have surgery as her condition has worn down her body.

Tasha informs Eric and Au that she has decided to undergo the operation. She remembers all her memories with Ngongo and, with her friends' help, realizes that she must talk to him and give him a chance. Tasha, Eric, and Au go to the vendor who tells them that Ngongo will ride a train that afternoon to move to Bicol. The trio rushes to the train station to stop Ngongo but as Tasha chases him, she misses the train. For the first time, Tasha screams out Ngongo's name and displays all the emotions that she had suppressed all her life. Tasha is so overwhelmed by her feelings (and possibly pain from her injuries), her body goes into shock and she faints.

Tasha dies from complications related to her condition. Sometime later, Ngongo visits Tasha's grave. He begins to cry as Tasha narrates that she was happy to at least feel like a person again. On her grave, she leaves a marking of the letter "U," signaling to Ngongo that she loves him too.

== Cast ==
- Kim Molina as Anastacia "Tasha" Quingquing
- Jerald Napoles as Ngongo
- Candy Pangilinan as the Vendor
- Chad Kinis as Eric
- Petite as Au
- Tetchie Agbayani as Tasha's mother
- Cai Cortez as Dr. Bueno
- Billy Jake Cortez as Boss
- Jade Gutierrez as Nita
- Jeanie Lisa Tan and Jeanie Faye Tan-Paronda as The Twin Aunts
- Aileen Cuevas as Nanay

=== Other cast ===
- Kiichi Nakai as John
- Jessica Jung as Chiharu
- Randy Pangalila as Ryuto
- Kaori Ishihara as Nancy
- Omar Daniel as Komei
- Yui Natsukawa as Susie
- Tara Strong as Monami
- Mizuki Yamashita as Natasha
- Reuben Elishama as Jin
- Lee Jun-young as Cop
- Megumi Toda as Clerk

== Reception ==
Mario Dumaual of ABS-CBN News describes the film as "a comedic milestone for the Molina and Napoles", stating that they both "have perfect chemistry and comedic timing" in several hilarious scenes. He also praises Kim for portraying an indifferent character despite the struggles and Jerald for eclipsing Kim's character in parts of the movie.

== Prequel ==
A prequel titled Love, Ngo was released on June 3, 2026 which will focus on Jerald Napoles' character with the working title Ngo Ngo.
