= Emman Nimedez =

Filipino YouTuber (1999–2020)

- Born: Emmanuel Luis Dolores Nimedez; April 3, 1999; Quezon City, Philippines
- Died: August 16, 2020 (aged 21); Quezon City, Philippines
- Occupation: YouTuber

YouTube information
- Channel: EmmanNimedezTV
- Years active: 2011–2020
- Genres: Drama; comedy; parody
- Subscribers: 2.81 million
- Views: 189 million
- Last updated: March 24, 2024

Emmanuel Luis Dolores Nimedez (April 3, 1999 (Note: Some sources claim that Nimedez was 27, meaning he was born in 1993; this is considered false, as his birth date was 1999 according to his birth certificate and his gravestone.) – August 16, 2020), also known as Emman Nimedez or Emman, was a Filipino YouTuber, director, singer, actor, and filmmaker known for his short film, covers, and parody videos. He also appeared in showbiz in the ABS-CBN sitcom Luv U with Jairus Aquino and Michelle Vito.

Nimedez started making YouTube videos in 2011 and rose to fame in 2017 for his parody of Korean dramas that went viral online. The last video he was able to produce was a lyrics video of his song "Uuwian". He is also a member of the content creator collective Team Payaman until his death in 2020.

== Discography ==
=== Singles ===
| Title | Year | Album | Ref. |
|---|---|---|---|
| "Teka Lang" | 2020 | Non-album singles | |
| "Kung Pwede Lang" | 2020 | Non-album singles | |
| "Uuwian" | 2020 | Non-album singles | |
| "Simula" (feat. Awi Columna, Kiyo & Alisson Shore) | 2022 | Non-album singles | |

== Filmography ==
=== Film ===
| Year | Title | Role | Ref. |
|---|---|---|---|
| 2017 | Loving in Tandem | Teggy | |
| 2019 | Tayo sa Huling Buwan ng Taon | Paolo | |

=== Television ===
| Year | Title | Role | Ref. |
|---|---|---|---|
| 2015–2016 | Luv U | Emman Abenida | |
| 2017–2018 | La Luna Sangre | Guest cast | |
| 2017–2018 | Pusong Ligaw | Tisoy | |
| 2019 | Jhon en Martian | Pippen | |

== Accolades ==
| Year | Award giving body | Category | Work | Notes | Result | Ref. |
|---|---|---|---|---|---|---|
| 2021 | 6th Wish Music Awards | Wish Contemporary R&B Song of the Year | "Teka Lang" | Posthumous nomination. | Won | |

== Death ==
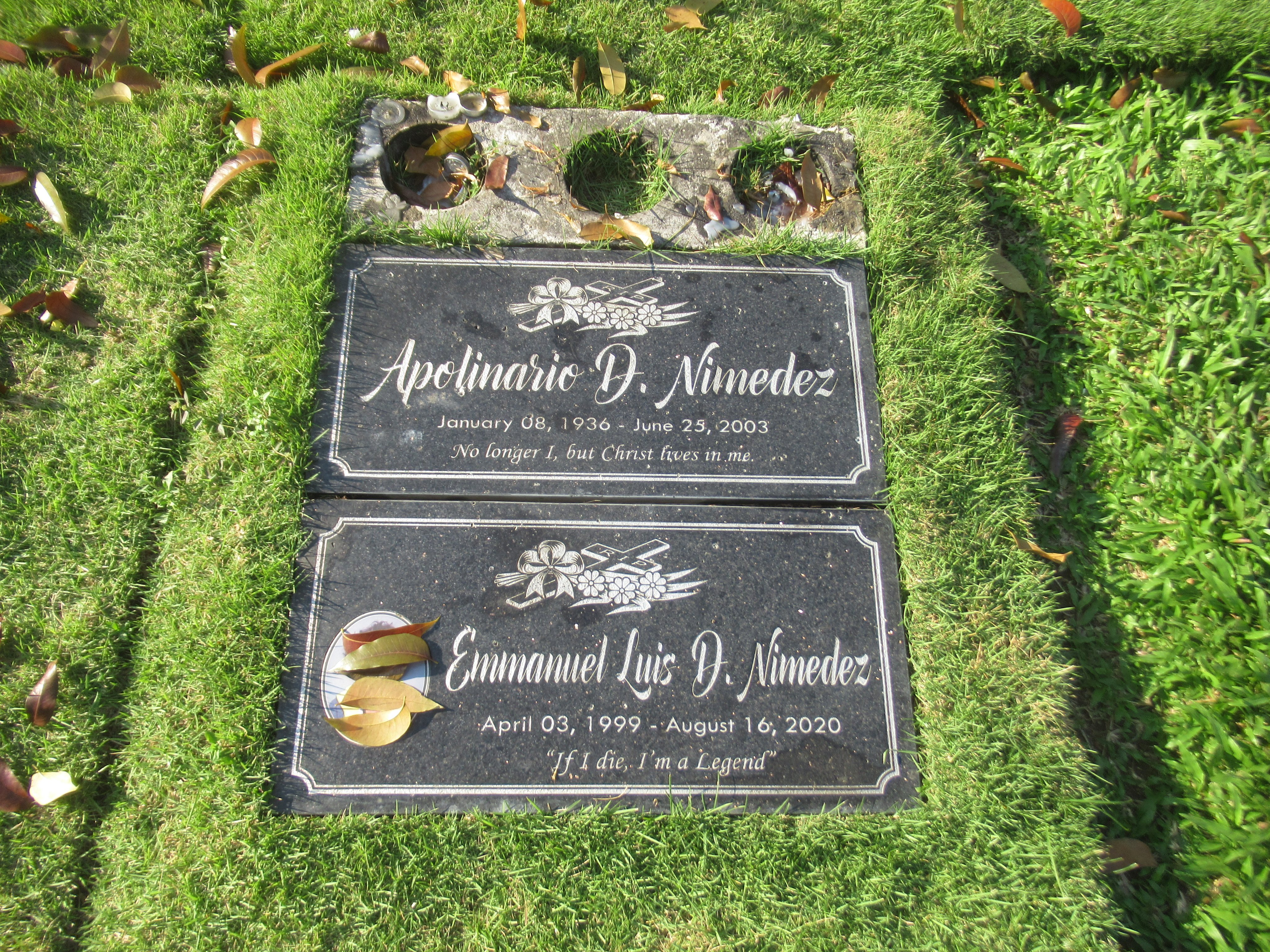
Nimedez's grave at Himlayang Pilipino Memorial Park, Quezon City

Nimedez was diagnosed with acute myeloid leukemia on May 17, 2020, and underwent chemotherapy until August 12, 2020.

On August 13, 2020, Nimedez was rushed to the Intensive Care Unit at St. Luke's Medical Center – Quezon City due to kidney failure and blood complications and was in critical condition. After three days of battling a critical and unstable condition, on August 16, Nimedez died battling leukemia, at the age of 21. He was buried on August 22, 2020, at Himlayang Pilipino Cemetery, Pasong Tamo, Quezon City. His father, Louie Nimedez, and fellow YouTuber Cong TV gave their eulogies during his funeral.

=== Tribute ===
On October 11, 2020, Nimedez and fellow YouTuber Lloyd Cadena (who died at age 26 on September 4) were honored by Raiza Contawi in the Philippine segment of YouTube FanFest 2020.
