= 2026 Metro Manila Film Festival =

52nd edition of annual Philippine film festival

2026 Metro Manila Film Festival 52nd Metro Manila Film Festival
- No. of films: 8
- Festival date: December 25, 2026 to TBA

MMFF chronology
- 53rd ed. 51st ed.

The 2026 Metro Manila Film Festival is the upcoming 52nd edition of the annual Metro Manila Film Festival which starts on December 25, 2026. During the festival, no foreign films are shown in Philippine theaters (excluding IMAX, 4DX, and ScreenX).

== Entries ==
=== Feature films ===
The first four official entries were announced on July 7, 2026. The announcement was made during the kickoff event held at Greenhills Mall in San Juan City.

The first four entries were chosen based on 24 submitted scripts. MMFF Executive Committee member Boots Anson-Roa explained the criteria for the chosen films: 40% technical and creative merit, 40% commercial value, 10% global appeal, 10% for the infusion of Filipino values.

During the presentation, Metropolitan Manila Development Authority chairman Don Artes also announced that the price cap for MMFF 2026 films is set at ₱299. However, the prices may still go lower depending on the decision of movie theaters nationwide. This was deliberated together with Cinema Exhibitors Association of the Philippines due to the raised concerns regarding high ticket prices in previous edition of the film festival.

Title	Starring	Production company	Director	Genre	Ref.
First batch
2nd Miracle in Cell No. 7	Aga Muhlach, Jodi Sta. Maria, and Xia Vigor	Viva Films	Nuel Naval	Drama	
Amir	Argus Aspiras, Dennis Trillo, Will Ashley, and Glaiza de Castro	GMA Pictures, GMA Public Affairs	Zig Dulay	Family drama, Fantasy	
Haunted Carnival	Julia Barretto, Maricel Soriano, James Reid, Fyang Smith, and John Arcilla	Regal Entertainment	Joey de Guzman	Horror	
The Greatest Showdown	Vice Ganda and Vic Sotto	Star Cinema, The IdeaFirst Company, APT Entertainment, and MZet Productions	Jun Robles Lana	Comedy, Drama	
Second batch
A Perfect Marriage	Kim Chiu and Paulo Avelino	Quantum Films	Dan Villegas	Drama	
Little Hope	Yassi Pressman and Pepe Herrera	Lonewolf Films	Benedict Mique	Family drama, Comedy	
Los Salvajes Bravos	Romnick Sarmenta and Ruru Madrid	Jesuit Communications Foundation	Paolo Dy	Historical, Drama	
Seeds of Peace: The Life of Fr. Rhoel D. Gallardo, CMF	Zaijian Jaranilla	Superior of the Filipino Corporation of Claretian Fathers, Inc.	Rommel Galapia Ruiz	Documentary	

== Parade of Stars ==
During the announcement of the first batch of entries, MMDA chairman Romando Artes announce that aside from the annual festival parade in Metro Manila, the parade will also be conducted for the first time in Bacolod on December 11, 2026. San Juan and Mandaluyong will jointly host the parade of stars for Metro Manila on December 18, 2026.

Preceded by 2025 Metro Manila Film Festival	Metro Manila Film Festival; 2026	Succeeded by 2027 Metro Manila Film Festival
