= Ngongo =

Ngongo may mean:

- Love, Ngo, a 2026 Philippine comedy film centering on people with cleft lip with the working title Ngongo
- "Ngongo", nickname of Angolan government official Roberto Leal Monteiro
- Ngongo, a dialect of the Nkutu language of the Democratic Republic of the Congo
- Ngongo, the name of a musical bow of the Kele people (Gabon)
