= Vien Iligan =

Filipino vlogger (born 1997)

- Born: January 20, 1997 (age 29)
- Occupations: Vlogger; entrepreneur
- Years active: 2019–present
- Spouse: Junnie Boy (m. 2022)
- Children: 2

YouTube information
- Channel: @VienIligan
- Years active: 2016–present
- Genre: Everyday life
- Subscribers: 3.38 million
- Views: 263 million
- Last updated: September 6, 2026

Vien Iligan-Velasquez (born January 20, 1997), is a Filipino vlogger and entrepreneur. She is a member of the content creator collective Team Payaman and is married to fellow content creator Junnie Boy.

== Early life ==
Iligan graduated from Lyceum of the Philippines University in General Trias in 2017 with a Bachelor of Science in Tourism.

== Career ==
In 2017, Before Iligan started her career as vlogger, she initiated contact with Marlon Cortez Velasquez Jr., known online as Junnie Boy, through a message on Facebook. She later said that she made the first move in their relationship.

In 2019, Iligan and her husband started vlogging. She credited Cong TV (brother of Junnie Boy) for inspiring them and introducing them to the vlogging. She was also mentioned that they were added to Cong TV's network of content creators.

Iligan declared in January 2025 that she would welcome the chance to do so if it arose. She continued to do online content creation while also focusing on her company investment portfolio in the same year. Iligan launched her Basic Tops collection at the 2024 Team Payaman Fair. She has also spoken out about the difficulties of a content creator, noting that the criticism of certain local content creators has made Team Payaman's members more conscious of their duty as content producers.

== Personal life ==
On March 28, 2022, Iligan and Junnie Boy were married in the Divine Mercy Parish in Silang, Cavite. They has two children.

In 2024, Iligan revealed her appearance after undergoing rhinoplasty and chin augmentation.
