= Lloyd Cadena =

Filipino YouTuber (1993–2020)

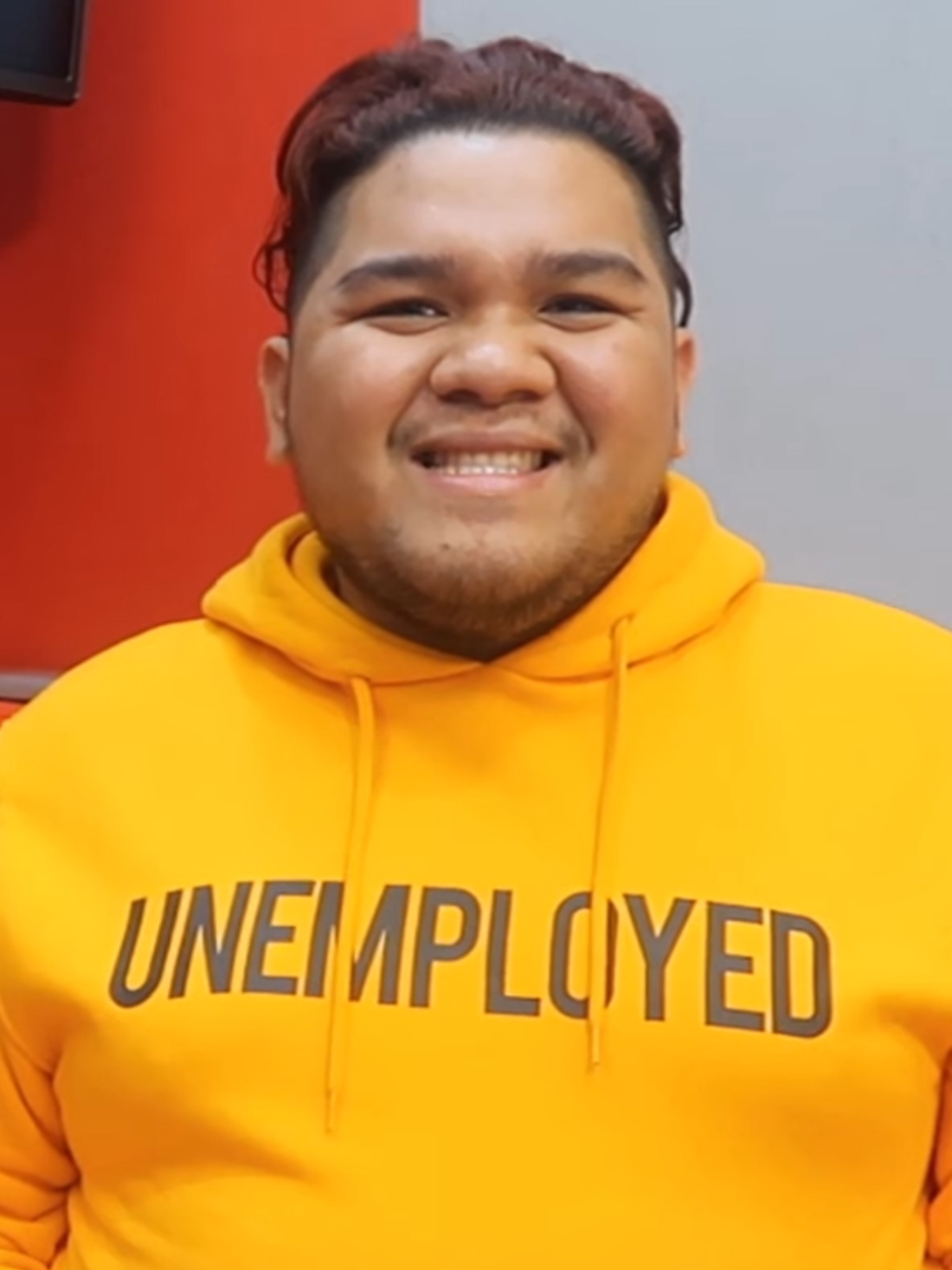
- Cadena in 2017
- Born: Lloyd Cafe Cadena; September 23, 1993; Parañaque, Philippines
- Died: September 4, 2020 (aged 26); Muntinlupa, Philippines
- Other name: Kween LC
- Education: Colegio de San Juan de Letran (BSBA)
- Occupations: YouTuber; vlogger; radio personality; author

YouTube information
- Channel: Lloyd Cafe Cadena
- Years active: 2011–2020
- Subscribers: 5.77 million
- Views: 551 million
- Last updated: March 18, 2026

Lloyd Cafe Cadena (September 23, 1993 – September 4, 2020) was a Filipino vlogger, radio personality, and author. He was one of the most popular YouTubers in his native Philippines, with over 5.86 million subscribers on the platform at the time of his death.

== Biography ==
Lloyd Cafe Cadena was born on September 23, 1993, in Parañaque.

He majored in financial management at the Colegio de San Juan de Letran and formerly studied at Olivarez College. As a student, he worked in Alyansa Letranista and the Letran Student Council alongside fellow YouTube vlogger and social media personality-activist Mark "MacoyDubs" Averilla.

Cadena had two older sisters and one older brother. His parents, Saturnino Cadena and Lorita Cafe are Filipino migrant workers in the United Arab Emirates. Upon Lloyd's newfound fame, he was able to bring his mother home, who in turn has succeeded him in the social media world as "Mother Kween".

== Career ==
=== Vlogging ===
Cadena started his main channel back in 2011 with parodies and started uploading videos for his infamous "LC Learns" series. His first video on his main channel was a parody of Shakira's "Rabiosa", uploaded on June 3, 2011. Before this, Cadena's first video was his parody of Lady Gaga's "Telephone", on his separate channel "Kween LC Updates" in 2010.

Cadena gained recognition on YouTube by documenting his travels, adventures, and 'all the crazy random things he gets into as he curiously explores the world,' as stated in his YouTube bio. His content spans various genres, including cooking, unboxing, challenge videos, pranks, and more. One of his vlogs has garnered over 3 million subscribers, while other videos on his channel have collectively amassed more than 252 million views.

He is considered one of the pioneers of YouTube vlogging in the Philippines. His videos racked up millions of views, including a 'last to leave the pool' challenge posted in June 2020 and various cooking videos.

=== Publishing ===
To further entice the youth to read, Cadena, together with six other authors Bryan Olano, Albert Apolonio, Marco Pile, Mark Anicas, Rhadson Mendoza, Sic Santos, and Angelo Nabor formed a boy band called The Bookmarks in 2013, then managed by PSICOM and Viva. The Bookmarks were more into making book signing events a fun destination for the youth.

He also signed with ABS-CBN Publishing and authored books such as Eng Serep Megwele (2014), Hopia (2015), Mahal Ko Na Siya...Rak Na Itu!!! (2016) and Ex-Rated in 2017.

=== Broadcasting ===
Alongside being a YouTuber, he also worked as a radio DJ on 93.9 iFM hosting a program called Gabi Ng Hanash (lit. 'Night of Hanash') in 2014. Cadena later moved to 90.7 Love Radio in 2017, hosting "KarLloyd" alongside fellow vlogger and DJ Kara Karinyosa.

== Death ==
On September 1, 2020, Cadena was hospitalized due to a high fever and dry cough; he later tested positive for COVID-19. He died three days later, on September 4, after suffering a cardiac arrest. His death occurred 19 days before what would have been his 27th birthday. He was later cremated.

Following the announcement of his death, known close friends, fellow vloggers, and celebrities expressed their condolences to Cadena's family, including American pop singer Mariah Carey, of whom Cadena was a fan. On October 11, 2020, he was posthumously honored alongside fellow YouTuber Emman Nimedez (who died at age 21 on August 16) in the Philippine segment of YouTube FanFest 2020.

== Philanthropy and legacy ==
Cadena was a known philanthropist and used his platform for charitable aid or donations. An August 21, 2020, video on his main channel followed Cadena as he went around his neighborhood in the Philippines and distributed tablets to students from his former school La Huerta Elementary for distance learning. That was not the first time Cadena reached out to La Huerta students – through the years, he had given them food packs, school supplies, and toys, helping pack the goods himself and delivering them personally as shown in his vlogs. Cadena also went out onto the streets of Baguio and gave random strangers cash. Additionally, he encouraged everyone to donate to non-governmental organizations (NGOs) that are working for the relief operations and rehabilitation of areas in Mindanao that were badly hit by an earthquake in 2019. In 2020, during the Taal Volcano eruption, he gave away relief packs to the community amid the lockdown and also extended help to COVID-19 frontliners by donating personal protective equipment to a hospital in Parañaque, Philippines.

== Awards and nominations ==
Year	Award	Category	Notes	Result	Ref.
2013	Globe Tatt Awards	Best Comedy on YouTube		Won	
2016	LIONHEARTV: RAWR Awards 2016	Favorite Influencer of the Year		Won	
2017	Influence Asia Awards	YouTube Personality Award		Won	
2020	CICP Spotlight Awards	Franco Santos Lifetime Achievement Award	Posthumous recognition.	Won	
