= He's Dating a Bold Star =

2026 Filipino romantic comedy film

- Theatrical release poster
- Directed by: Niox Arcega
- Written by: Gela Quevedo
- Produced by: Niox Arcega
- Starring: Malupiton; Analyn Barro
- Production company: NKO Films
- Release date: 28 October 2026 (Philippines)
- Country: Philippines
- Language: Filipino

He's Dating a Bold Star is a 2026 Filipino romantic comedy film directed and produced by Niox Arcega, written by Gela Quevedo. The film stars Malupiton as Jeboy, an ordinary hotel employee and aspiring singer who falls in love with Kit, a bold star portrayed by Analyn Barro. The film was produced by NKO Films and released in Philippine cinemas on 28 October 2026.

== Cast ==
- Malupiton as Jeboy
- Analyn Barro as Kit
- Dominic "Happy Friend" Biong (Note: Member of collective group Kolokoys TV)
- Joshua "Awut" Padigos
- Nelson "Porman" Nielo
- Bonn Earl Aquino
- Mac Temones
- Allen Deniro
- Atha Quevedo
- Aleck Bovick
- Rob Sy
- Leandro Baldemor

== Production ==
The film was first announced in December 2024, when Malupiton revealed during an interview on Toni Gonzaga's Toni Talks that he was working on a film titled He's Dating a Bold Star. He also confirmed that Analyn Barro would play his leading lady and that filming had already started.

Niox Arcega directed and produced the film under NKO Films. It marked Malupiton's first leading role in a film. He previously made his film debut in Love, Ngo (2026). During the film's production, Malupiton said that acting in a scripted film was different from making his usual online videos. He found it challenging to memorise lines and perform emotional scenes. The film's comedy was influenced by Filipino comedians such as Dolphy, Babalu, Redford White and Michael V..

The soundtrack features songs from Filipino bands including Android-18, Silent Sanctuary, Kiko Machine and Doomrockets.

== Release ==
He's Dating a Bold Star was released in Philippine cinemas on 28 October 2026.

== Reception ==
Pauline del Rosario of Inquirer Bandera, described the film as a "light comedy with a love story". She praised the comedic performances of Malupiton and Barro and their pairing in the film.
