= Little Hope (film) =

- Directed by: Benedict Mique
- Starring: Yassi Pressman; Pepe Herrera
- Production company: Lonewolf Films
- Distributed by: Solar Pictures
- Release date: December 25, 2026
- Country: Philippines
- Language: Filipino

Little Hope is an upcoming Philippine comedy drama film directed by Benedict Mique under Lonewolf Films starring Yassi Pressman and Pepe Herrera.

== Cast ==
- Yassi Pressman
- Pepe Herrera
- Cailey Magno

== Production ==
Little Hope was directed by Benedict Mique under Lonewolf Films The film also marks as the first time actress Yassi Pressman served as a film producer. According to Mique, the film is about a girl diagnosed with cancer looking for someone to look over her only parent–her father in anticipation of her death.

The film was initially submitted as a script for the 2026 Metro Manila Film Festival (MMFF) but was not among the first four announced films in July 2026. Principal photography for the film finished by June 2026, and was entirely shot in Camarines Sur. It was again submitted to the MMFF as a finished film and was accepted.

== Release ==
Little Hope will premiere in cinemas in the Philippines on December 25, 2026, as one of the official entries of the 52nd Metro Manila Film Festival.
