= Little Hope =

Little Hope may refer to:

- Little Hope (film), a 2026 Philippine comedy-drama film
- Little Hope, Alabama, an unincorporated community
- Little Hope, Pennsylvania, an unincorporated community
- Little Hope, Texas, an unincorporated community
- Little Hope, Wisconsin, an unincorporated community
- The Dark Pictures Anthology: Little Hope, a 2020 survival horror video game

== See also ==
- Little Hope River, a river in New Zealand
