= Ang Pangarap Kong Holdap =

- Film poster
- Directed by: Marius Talampas
- Written by: Marius Talampas
- Produced by: Erwin Blanco
- Starring: Pepe Herrera; Jerald Napoles; Jelson Bay; Paolo Contis
- Cinematography: Zach Sycip
- Edited by: Vanessa De Leon
- Music by: Francis De Veyra
- Production company: Mavx Productions
- Distributed by: OctoArts Films
- Release date: November 28, 2018
- Country: Philippines
- Language: Filipino

Ang Pangarap Kong Holdap (transl. My Dream Robbery) is a 2018 Philippine comedy heist film directed by Marius Talampas.

A spiritual successor, titled Ang Pangarap Kong Oskars, was released on June 28, 2023, with Contis returning, albeit as a different character.

== Plot ==
The film follows Eman Durucut (Pepe Herrera), a down-on-his-luck robber, who leads a group of fellow robbers consisting of himself, Toto (Jerald Napoles), and Carlo (Jelson Bay), as well as newcomer Nicoy (Paolo Contis), who, unbeknownst to them, is an undercover cop. Eman aspires his group to be the number one gang in Barangay Husay to follow the legacy of his father who is known for being the most notorious in their locale.

== Cast ==
- Pepe Herrera as Eman Durucut
- Jerald Napoles as Toto
- Jelson Bay as Carlo
- Paolo Contis as Nicoy
- Pen Medina as Ka Paeng Durucut

== Release ==
Ang Pangarap Kong Holdap premiered in the Philippines on November 28, 2018. The film had dismal reception during its theatrical release. It was given a R-16 rating by the Movie and Television Review and Classification Board and there was difficulty in securing slots in local cinemas limiting the film's reach. According to Paolo Contis, one of the film's lead actors, cinema owners were hesitant of screening Ang Pangarap Kong Holdap due to a perception that the film title has a "bad connotation". According to director Marius Talampas, the film was only shown on mainstream cinemas for less than a week and was only screened in microcinemas thereafter where the film gradually garnered a cult following.

The film was released in Netflix on July 2, 2020 where it had more success. Ang Pangarap Kong Holdap became the number one most viewed film in the Philippines within 24 hours of its premiere in the digital platform and is still within the top ten most viewed film three days later.
