= Junnie Boy =

Filipino YouTuber

- Born: Marlon Cortez Velasquez Jr. July 5, 1994 (age 32)
- Spouse: Vien Iligan (m. 2022)
- Relatives: Cong TV (brother)

YouTube information
- Years active: 2017–present
- Genre: Comedy
- Subscribers: 4.88 million
- Views: 263 million
- Last updated: March 2026

Marlon Cortez Velasquez Jr. (born July 5, 1994), known online as Junnie Boy, is a Filipino YouTuber. He is known for his humorous vlogs and as a member of the content creators collective Team Payaman. He is the younger brother of Cong TV.

== Life and career ==
Marlon Cortez Velasquez Jr. was born on July 5, 1994, to Marlon Velasquez Sr. and Jovel Cortez Velasquez. He has three siblings: Lincoln and Patricia, who are both internet personalities known as Cong TV and Pat, respectively, as well as Venice.

In 2020, Velasquez became engaged to co-vlogger Vien Iligan. They were married in 2022 and have two children.

=== Career ===
Velasquez had already been appearing in Cong TV's early YouTube vlogs before creating his own channel in 2017. Velasquez began uploading videos consistently a year later and eventually gained a significant number of subscribers. He is one of the core members of the content creators collective Team Payaman, which was formed by Cong TV. The group rose to prominence in 2020 during the COVID-19 pandemic. In 2021, Velasquez and Cong TV appeared in a Mountain Dew commercial with James Reid. As a member of Tier One Entertainment, Velasquez supported Mobile Legends: Bang Bang (MLBB) at the 2021 Southeast Asian Games. Netflix partnered with Velasquez ate a promotional teaser video parodying the live-action "One Piece" series, which premiered on the platform on August 31, 2023.
