= Sins of the Father (TV series) =

Philippine crime drama series

- Title card
- Genre: Crime thriller; Mystery; Action; Drama
- Written by: Cenon Palomares; Dindo Perez; Jann Kayla Mendoza; Jasper Paras
- Directed by: FM Reyes; Bjoy Balagtas; Avel Sunpongco; Gerald Anderson
- Starring: Gerald Anderson; Shaina Magdayao; Jessy Mendiola; JC de Vera; RK Bagatsing; Francine Diaz; Seth Fedelin
- Music by: Francis Concio
- Country of origin: Philippines
- Original language: Filipino
- No. of seasons: 2
- No. of episodes: 110

Production
- Executive producers: Carlo L. Katigbak; Cory V. Vidanes; Laurenti M. Dyogi; Julie Anne R. Benitez
- Producers: Maya Aralar; Marissa Kalaw
- Production location: Metro Manila
- Cinematography: David Diaz Abaia; Mark Joshua Tirona
- Editors: Mark Segubience; Emerson Torres; Kathleen Chavez; Karla Diaz
- Camera setup: Single-camera
- Running time: 19–37 minutes
- Production company: JRB Creative Productions

Original release
- Network: Kapamilya Channel (Note: The series is aired on Kapamilya Channel and other blocktime channels and platforms, with delayed telecast on Jeepney TV. It is also available for streaming on-demand via Kapamilya Online Live, with advanced episodes on iWant and internationally via TFC.)
- Release: June 23 – November 21, 2025

Sins of the Father is a 2025 Philippine television drama crime thriller series broadcast by Kapamilya Channel. It is an original story that tackles the issue of scamming and internet fraud. Directed by FM Reyes, Bjoy Balagtas and Avel Sunpongco, it stars Gerald Anderson, Shaina Magdayao, Jessy Mendiola, JC de Vera, RK Bagatsing, Francine Diaz and Seth Fedelin. It aired on the network's Primetime Bida line up and worldwide on TFC from June 23 to November 21, 2025.

== Premise ==
Samuel Trinidad is a bank manager whose life changes after his father dies. He discovers that his father was involved in a scam and must deal with its consequences, protect his family, and confront the people involved. He faces a decision between following his principles and taking illegal actions to resolve the situation.

== Cast and characters ==
Cast

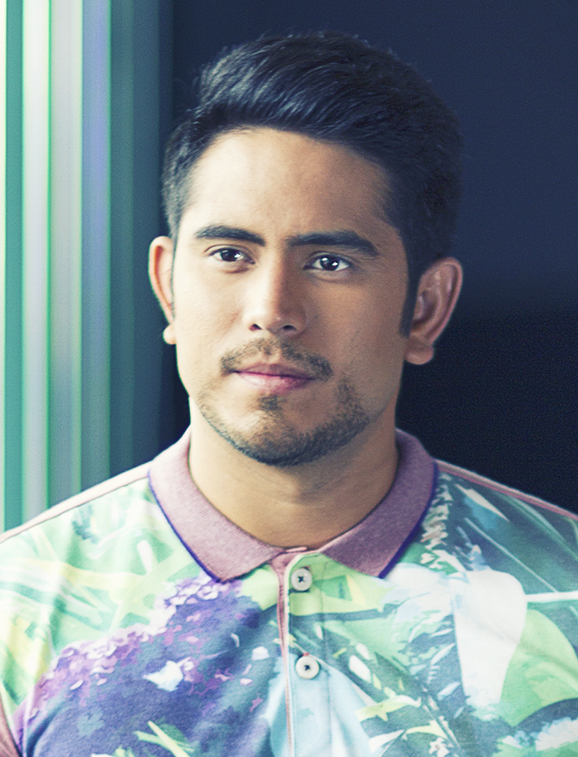
Gerald Anderson

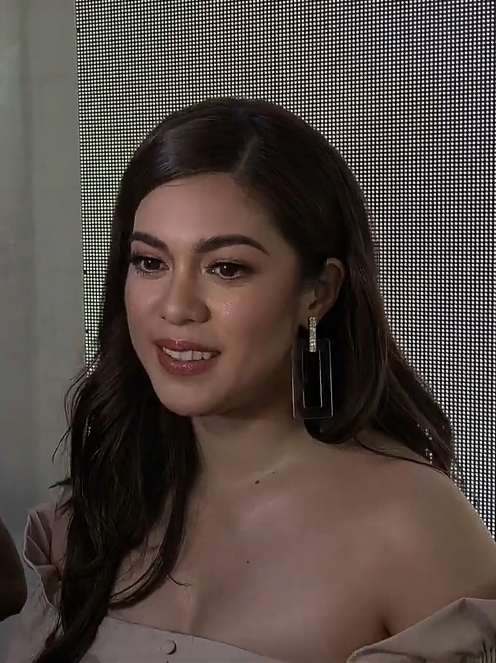
Shaina Magdayao

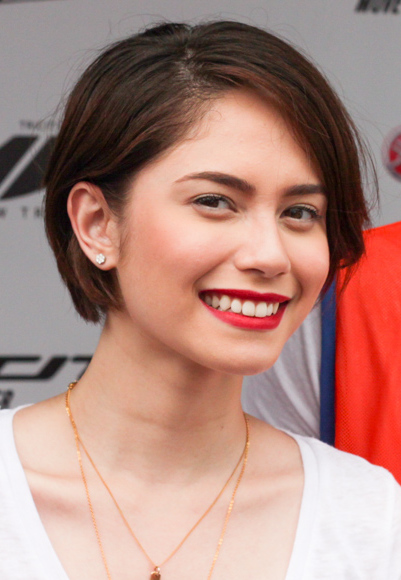
Jessy Mendiola

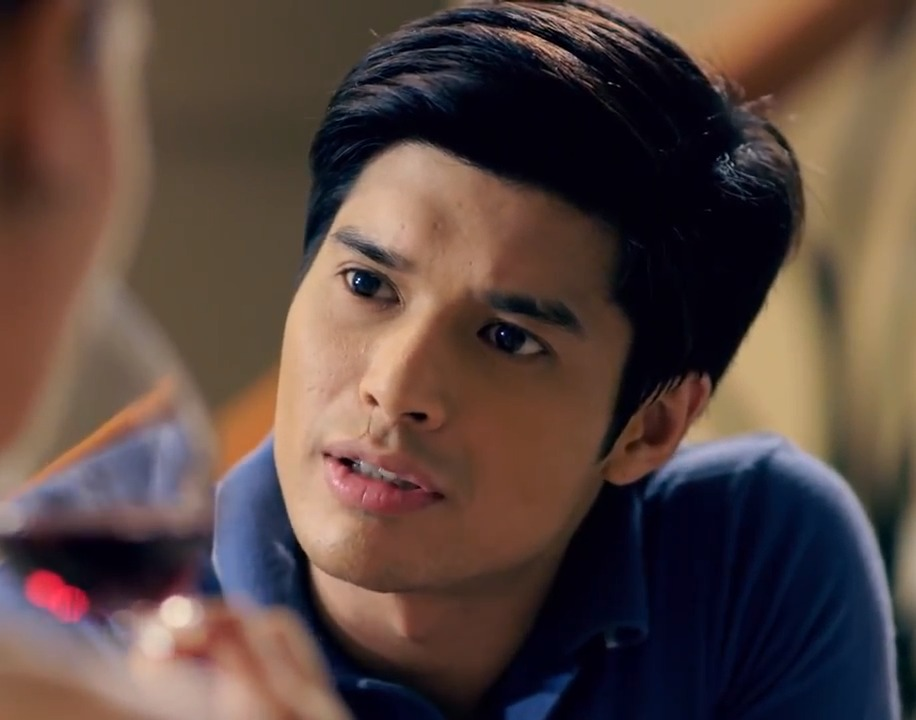
JC de Vera

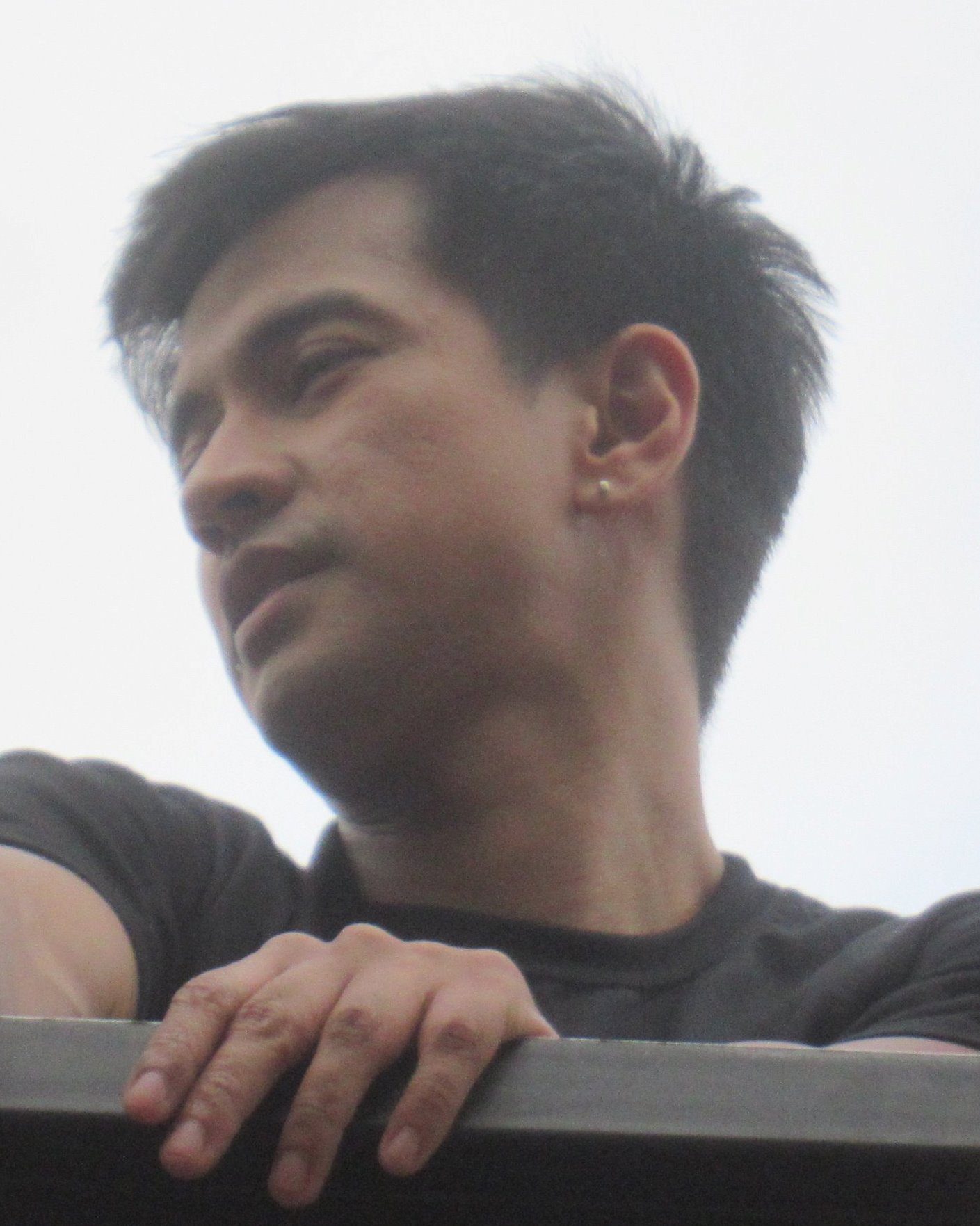
RK Bagatsing

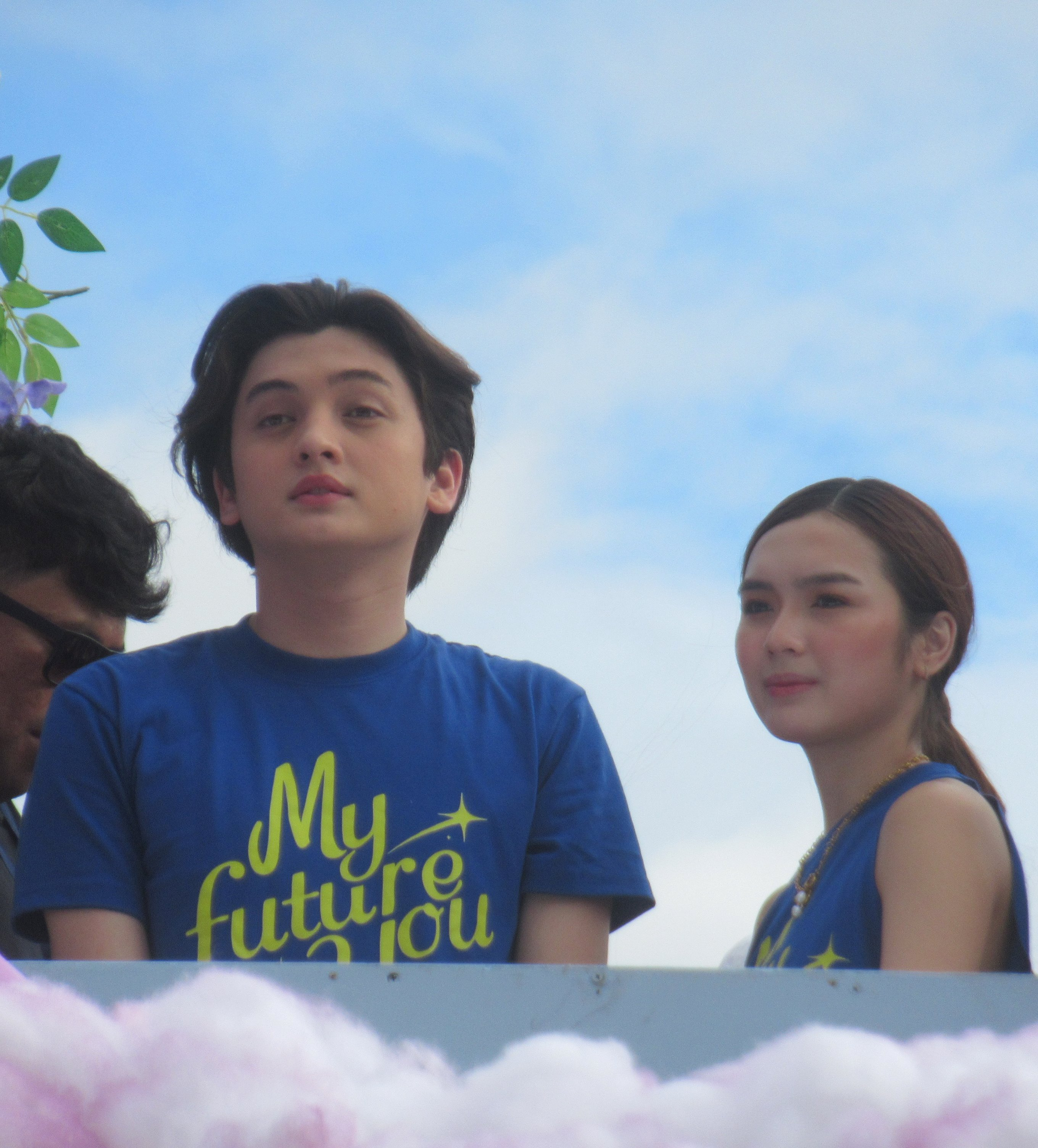
Francine Diaz & Seth Fedelin

=== Main cast ===
- Gerald Anderson as Samuel Trinidad: A bank manager who used to work at Golden Trust Bank but was fired from work because of the Yayaman Tayo scam of his father, Mike. He works at Oriental Ridge to earn money after he was refused by other employers.
  - James King as young Samuel
- Shaina Magdayao as Atty. Leah Ramirez-Rivera: A highly-intelligent attorney who is Jacob's wife and Diego's daughter. As per Enzo's request, she helps the victims of the Yayaman Tayo scam.
- Jessy Mendiola as Agnes Garcia-Policarpio: Johnny's wife who works as an executive assistant at Oriental Ridge and a civilian asset of the police. She always help Samuel when he's in trouble.
- JC de Vera as Jacob Rivera: Atty. Leah's husband, Roldan's younger brother, and Enzo's uncle. He works at Oriental Ridge with his CEO brother, Roldan.
  - Justin Mclaire as teen Jacob
  - Miguel Casimiro as young Jacob
- RK Bagatsing as PO2 Johnny Policarpio (Note: The character's rank is based on R.A. No. 11200, the current law prescribing police ranks in the Philippines): Agnes' husband who works as a police officer and is very eager to punish criminals especially scammers. He admires retired General Diego Ramirez who is a famous scam buster. Also Leah's half older brother.
- Francine Diaz as Arissa Trinidad: Samuel's half-sister from US who was not allowed to leave by immigration because of the Yayaman Tayo scam so she decided to work at a cafe where Enzo also works.
- Seth Fedelin as Lorenzo "Enzo" Rivera: Jacob's nephew and Roldan's only child who is independent and hates scammers. He works as a grab driver and barista at a cafe to sustain his daily needs.
  - Sean Rhys Stevens as young Enzo

=== Recurring cast ===
- Lotlot de Leon as Lolita Trinidad: Samuel's mother who is very protective of her grandson, King. She used to be the ex-wife of Mike who cheated on her with Arissa's mother.
- Joko Diaz as Roldan Rivera: Jacob's older brother, Atty. Leah's brother-in-law, and Enzo's father who is the CEO of Oriental Ridge.
  - Zach Guerrero as teen Roldan
  - Raven Rigor as young adult Roldan
- Soliman Cruz as Pol. Col. Enrico Villanueva : A police colonel behind the investigation of Bakunawa group.
- Tirso Cruz III as Ret. Pol. General Diego Ramirez / Tanda: A retired police general who is Atty. Leah's father and Jacob's father-in-law. He is the head of Bakunawa
  - Dominic Ochoa as young Diego
- Jerald Napoles as Ismael "Mael" Dimagiba: A computer hacker who is a loyal friend of Samuel.
- Malou Crisologo as Rebekkah "Bekkah" Madlangbayan: She is a loyal employee of Roldan who works at Oriental Ridge as an HR officer.
- Nico Antonio as Atty. Rafael "Paeng" Sandoval: An attorney who is friends with Samuel.
- LA Santos as Xenon Agustin: An orphan who is very attached to Jacob.
  - Adrian Vernon Adams as teen Xenon
  - Zion Cruz as young Xenon
- JV Kapunan (Note: Credited as Young JV.) as Rudy "Boying" Ortega: A tricycle driver who is one of the victims of the Yayaman Tayo scam.
- Johannes Risler as Jordan: Roldan's bodyguard who works at Oriental Ridge.
- Jeremiah Lisbo as Luke Delgado: An illegitimate child of a congressman who works as a manager where Arissa and Enzo works. He is also the best friend of Enzo.
- Elyson de Dios as PO3 Noel Alcantara : A police officer who works with Johnny for the investigation of the Yayaman Tayo scam.
- Clave Sun (Note: Credited as Milzen Clave Sun.) as Arthur James "King" Trinidad: Samuel's son, Arissa's nephew, and Lolita's grandchild. He is friends with Chloe.
- Cailey Magno (Note: Credited as Cailey Ayesha L. Magno.) as Chloe Rivera: Jacob and Leah's daughter, who is friends with King. She is also the niece of Roldan and the cousin of Enzo.

=== Guest cast ===
- Ace Carrera as Ralph
- Alex Medina as Norlan Gonzales
- Alireza Libre as Pol. Maj. Gilbert Manahan
- Allan Villafuerte as Emerson Diaz
- Amy Nobleza as Rowena Sison
- Angelica Lao as Delilah
- Apollo Abraham as Pol. Col. Armando Ruiz
- Ashton Salvador as Gavin Evangelista
- Aubrey Miles as Ellen Williams
- Barbie Imperial as Naomi Silvano / Shanaia
- Binsoy Namoca as Josh
- Bodjie Pascua as Fr. Jerry
- Carlo Torrabal as Roldan's henchman
- Christian Esguerra as himself
- David Shouder as David
- Derrick Hubalde as Peklat
- Dwin Araza as Richard Romulo
- Dylan Yturralde as Kenny
- Eric Fructuoso as Matthias Vergara: A programmer known as a "God of Codes" and one of its motives for Bakunawa, who created an scamming app that convinces people to receive money by creating an account, but was awfully scammed.
- Eslove Briones as Revo Diaz
- Guilio de Martile as Tangkad
- Hasna Cabral as Mildred Gonzales
- Janel Estuya as a private investigator
- Jett Pangan as Pol. General Joel Balagtas
- Jhan Arjay Nacor as Diego's bodyguard
- Jimma Nariz as Mira Ortega: Boying's wife
- Joel Molina as Det. Adrian Palomares
- Joel Saracho as Pastor Ferdie Almonte: A rapist and a pastor behind the charity scam for Bakunawa.
- John Arcilla as Miguel "Mike" Trinidad: A banker at the Golden Trust Bank, who was responsible for the Yayaman Tayo scam. He committed suicide leaving its trace of money to Samuel because of suspicious motive of Bakunawa, which he usually works as a manager. He also abandoned Lolita and Samuel because he had affair with his other lover, who gave birth to Arissa.
- Johnny Revilla as Mr. Gomez
- Jonah Mae Daileg as Jonah
- Jun Nayra as Henry
- Junjun Quintana as Alex Tobias
- Justin Hernandez
- Kimmy Obena as Maddie
- Kolette Madelo as Tin
- Larissa Buendia as Suzy
- Lei Ang as Abby del Rosario
- Manuel Chua as Vince
- Malupiton (Note: Credited as Joel "Malupiton" Ravanera) as himself
- Marco Reginio as Marco
- Mark Striegl
- Mel Martinez as Valentino "Love" Narciso: A fashion designer who is responsible for leading the online poker scam for Bakunawa.
- Melissa Mendez as Carina Silvano
- Mickey Ferriols as Amelia Rivera
- Miguel Vergara as Zeke Dionisio
- Moi Santillan as Judith
- Noel Christian Garcia as Benj Ferrer
- Noel Colet as Mr. Sanchez
- Randy dela Cruz as Capt. Brunch
- Raul Montesa as Dr. Alquiroz
- Reign Parani as Diane Mendoza / Larra
- River Joseph as Rainier Cruz
- Rocky Labayen as PO1 Gallago
- Rodex Piala
- Roli Innocencio as Winston
- Ruby Ruiz as Bebina
- Ruffy Ngo as Hon. Fernando P. Santos
- Simon Ibarra as Congressman Abel Monteribano: A congressman who is responsible for leading the charity scam for Bakunawa.
- Sky Quizon as vlogger
- Smokey Manaloto as Anton Dionisio
- Tanjo Villoso
- Tonton Gutierrez as Pol. Col. Joseph Garcia : Agnes's father and then-police colonel who was killed while on duty for investigating its true motives of Bakunawa.
- Viveika Ravanes as Len Mendoza
- VJ Mendoza as vlogger
- William Lorenzo as Paulo Evangelista
- Zabel Lamberth as Celina Ramos / Mandy
- Zeppi Borromeo as Danny

== Episodes ==
Season	Episodes	Originally released	
Season	Episodes	First released	Last released
1	50	June 23, 2025	August 29, 2025
2	60	September 1, 2025	November 21, 2025

=== Season 1 ===
No. overall	No. in season	Title	TV title	Original release date
1	1	"A Father's Debt"	Sins of the Father	June 23, 2025
2	2	"A Son's Loss"	Past of the Father	June 24, 2025
3	3	"Inherited Trouble"	Scam of the Father	June 25, 2025
4	4	"Locked Assets"	Victims of the Father	June 26, 2025
5	5	"Fortune's Burden"	Secrets of the Father	June 27, 2025
6	6	"High Stakes, Hot Pursuit"	Danger of the Father	June 30, 2025
7	7	"Hard Bargain"	Trap of the Father	July 1, 2025
8	8	"Onboarding"	Asset of the Father	July 2, 2025
9	9	"Capital Recall"	Memory of the Father	July 3, 2025
10	10	"Paper Trail"	Twist of the Father	July 4, 2025
11	11	"Insider Risk"	Risk of the Father	July 7, 2025
12	12	"Risk Exposure"	Shadow of the Father	July 8, 2025
13	13	"Hidden Stake"	Stake of the Father	July 9, 2025
14	14	"Margin Call"	Hunt of the Father	July 10, 2025
15	15	"Cost Basis"	Cost of the Father	July 11, 2025
16	16	"Withholding Value"	Fear of the Father	July 14, 2025
17	17	"Running on Empty"	Search of the Father	July 15, 2025
18	18	"Sealed Bonds"	Clue of the Father	July 16, 2025
19	19	"Balance Due"	Chaos of the Father	July 17, 2025
20	20	"The Scripture Code"	Escape of the Father	July 18, 2025
21	21	"The Weight of Legacy"	Loyalty of the Father	July 21, 2025
22	22	"Terms and Conditions"	Legacy of the Father	July 22, 2025
23	23	"The Debt of Guilt"	Debt of the Father	July 23, 2025
24	24	"The Offer"	Pressure of the Father	July 24, 2025
25	25	"Unclaimed Shares"	Ghost of the Father	July 25, 2025
26	26	"Collateral Ties"	Suffering of the Father	July 28, 2025
27	27	"Redacted History"	Questions of the Father	July 29, 2025
28	28	"Conflicted Assets"	Hesitations of the Father	July 30, 2025
29	29	"The Dividend"	Rivalry of the Father	July 31, 2025
30	30	"Trade Secrets"	Empire of the Father	August 1, 2025
31	31	"Monetary Shift"	Plan of the Father	August 4, 2025
32	32	"Counter Offer"	Offer of the Father	August 5, 2025
33	33	"Deal at Risk"	Deal of the Father	August 6, 2025
34	34	"Critical Lead"	Lead of the Father	August 7, 2025
35	35	"Countermove"	Stalker of the Father	August 8, 2025
36	36	"Capital Gains"	Struggle of the Father	August 11, 2025
37	37	"Liquidity Crisis"	Vengeance of the Father	August 12, 2025
38	38	"Convergence Risk"	Threat of the Father	August 13, 2025
39	39	"Credit Exposure"	Exposure of the Father	August 14, 2025
40	40	"Credit Exposure"	Conflict of the Father	August 15, 2025
41	41	"Balancing the Book"	Skills of the Father	August 18, 2025
42	42	"Credit Line"	Encounter of the Father	August 19, 2025
43	43	"Leveraged Entry"	Leverage of the Father	August 20, 2025
44	44	"Protected Equity"	Bargain of the Father	August 21, 2025
45	45	"Deadly Accounts"	Guilt of the Father	August 22, 2025
46	46	"Asset in Play"	Keys of the Father	August 25, 2025
47	47	"Shadow Account"	Doubts of the Father	August 26, 2025
48	48	"Hostile Takeover"	Betrayal of the Father	August 27, 2025
49	49	"Margin of One"	Game of the Father	August 28, 2025
50	50	"The Hundredfold Risk"	Survival of the Father	August 29, 2025

=== Season 2 ===
No. overall	No. in season	Title	TV title	Original release date
51	1	"The Rescue Bid"	Quest of the Father	September 1, 2025
52	2	"Floating Loss"	Wounds of the Father	September 2, 2025
53	3	"Asset Retrieval"	Retrieval of the Father	September 3, 2025
54	4	"Parallel Trades"	Alliance of the Father	September 4, 2025
55	5	"Emotional Dividend"	Scars of the Father	September 5, 2025
56	6	"Diversions and Dedutions"	Modus of the Father	September 8, 2025
57	7	"Chains of Credit"	Disguise of the Father	September 9, 2025
58	8	"Laundering Shadows"	Test of the Father	September 10, 2025
59	9	"Auditing Loyalties"	Tension of the Father	September 11, 2025
60	10	"Training the Capital"	Fraud of the Father	September 12, 2025
61	11	"Unsettled Accounts"	Watch of the Father	September 15, 2025
62	12	"Frozen Assets"	Sabotage of the Father	September 16, 2025
63	13	"Residuals"	Deception of the Father	September 17, 2025
64	14	"False Entries"	Code of the Father	September 18, 2025
65	15	"The Tipping Point"	Plea of the Father	September 19, 2025
66	16	"Locked Accounts"	Issue of the Father	September 22, 2025
67	17	"Cash Flow Crisis"	Crisis of the Father	September 23, 2025
68	18	"Default Penalty"	Penalty of the Father	September 24, 2025
69	19	"Negative Equity"	Equity of the Father	September 25, 2025
70	20	"Bankrupt Trust"	Negligence of the Father	September 26, 2025
71	21	"Risk Premium"	Rivals of the Father	September 29, 2025
72	22	"Trigger Point"	Trigger of the Father	September 30, 2025
73	23	"High-Value Deposit"	Sacrifice of the Father	October 1, 2025
74	24	"Loss of Trust"	Revelations of the Father	October 2, 2025
75	25	"The Withdrawal Rights"	Greed of the Father	October 3, 2025
76	26	"Deferred Investment"	Pain of the Father	October 6, 2025
77	27	"Ponzi Legacy"	Rage of the Father	October 7, 2025
78	28	"Strategic Alliance"	Burden of the Father	October 8, 2025
79	29	"Proxy Investment"	Proxy of the Father	October 9, 2025
80	30	"The Wager"	Duel of the Father	October 10, 2025
81	31	"Asset Mapping"	Strategy of the Father	October 13, 2025
82	32	"Containment Strategy"	Cover Up of the Father	October 14, 2025
83	33	"Chasing Returns"	Intention of the Father	October 15, 2025
84	34	"Hedged Gamble"	Battle of the Father	October 16, 2025
85	35	"Unhedged"	Sabong of the Father	October 17, 2025
86	36	"Corporate Succession"	Dark Side of the Father	October 20, 2025
87	37	"Succession Crisis"	Syndicate of the Father	October 21, 2025
88	38	"Forced Liquidation"	Instinct of the Father	October 22, 2025
89	39	"Contested Stake"	Allies of the Father	October 23, 2025
90	40	"Insider Revolt"	Friction of the Father	October 24, 2025
91	41	"Double Down"	Intuition of the Father	October 27, 2025
92	42	"Profit and Loss"	Breakout of the Father	October 28, 2025
93	43	"Arms and Equity"	Menace of the Father	October 29, 2025
94	44	"Liquidated Bonds"	Imposter of the Father	October 30, 2025
95	45	"Collateral Inquiry"	Lurker of the Father	October 31, 2025
96	46	"Firewall Breach"	Warriors of the Father	November 3, 2025
97	47	"False Accounting"	Hunch of the Father	November 4, 2025
98	48	"The Take Back"	Spy of the Father	November 5, 2025
99	49	"Burn Rate"	Fury of the Father	November 6, 2025
100	50	"Profit and Peril"	Rebellion of the Father	November 7, 2025
101	51	"Asset Under Fire"	Fright of the Father	November 10, 2025
102	52	"Debt Collection"	Captive of the Father	November 11, 2025
103	53	"The Fiscal Conspiracy"	Power of the Father	November 12, 2025
104	54	"Down Turn"	Vow of the Father	November 13, 2025
105	55	"Devalued"	Accusation of the Father	November 14, 2025
106	56	"Collateral Betrayal"	Corruption of the Father	November 17, 2025
107	57	"Power Bonds"	Expose of the Father	November 18, 2025
108	58	"The Buyout"	Rescue of the Father	November 19, 2025
109	59	"The Last Investment"	Salvation of the Father	November 20, 2025
110	60	"Redemption of the Son"	Redemption of the Son	November 21, 2025

== Production ==
The series was originally titled Nobody and was originally set to be an action drama series as announced on August 29, 2024, with Gerald Anderson taking the lead role in after a two-year break. On November 11, 2024, it has been confirmed that Jessy Mendiola has been added to the cast with JC de Vera and will be her acting comeback after 5 years with Benedict Mique and Rae Red originally set to direct. RK Bagatsing, Francine Diaz and Seth Fedelin were also added to the cast in December 2024. On March 25, 2025, a star studded cast were announced with a new title Sins of the Father which will now be expanded into a crime thriller mystery action drama with FM Reyes and Bjoy Balagtas at the helm. On August 13, 2025, Gerald Anderson made his first-ever debut as a director starting in an episode about one man vs 100 enemies.

== Marketing ==
The first trailer was released on June 5, 2025.

== Release ==
Sins of the Father premiered on June 23, 2025, on Kapamilya Channel, A2Z, TV5, and worldwide via The Filipino Channel. It is also available on-demand via iWant.

== Reception ==
Sins of the Father opened with 254,464 concurrent viewers on Kapamilya Online Live.
