= Bantay-Bahay =

2024 horror comedy film by Jose Javier Reyes

- Theatrical release poster
- Directed by: Jose Javier Reyes
- Written by: Jose Javier Reyes
- Screenplay by: Jose Javier Reyes
- Story by: Sketch Sabangan
- Produced by: Lily Y. Monteverde; Roselle Y. Monteverde
- Starring: Pepe Herrera; Karl Gabriel; Melissa Jimenez
- Cinematography: Jeyow Evangelista
- Edited by: Chrisel Galeno-Desuasido; Jayvee Kang Margaja
- Music by: Myka Magsaysay; Paul Sigua
- Production company: Regal Entertainment
- Distributed by: Regal Entertainment
- Release date: May 1, 2024
- Running time: 86 minutes
- Country: Philippines
- Languages: Filipino; English

Bantay-Bahay, also known as The Guardian, is a 2024 Philippine supernatural comedy horror film written and directed by Jose Javier Reyes. Starring Pepe Herrera, the film follows a live streamer who is trapped inside of an engkanto-infested old house.

Produced and distributed by Regal Entertainment, the film was theatrically released on May 1, 2024.

== Plot ==
Caleb, an over-enthusiastic vlogger and podcaster, is on the lookout for unique content to engage his growing online audience. When his girlfriend, Ella, asks him to house-sit her grandmother's ancestral home in a remote provincial area, Caleb sees it as an opportunity to create a compelling vlog series. Unbeknownst to him, the house harbors dark secrets that have been concealed for generations.

Upon arriving at the isolated mansion, Caleb is immediately struck by its eerie atmosphere. The house is filled with antique furniture, faded portraits, and a pervasive sense of melancholy. Despite the unsettling ambiance, Caleb sets up his equipment and begins documenting his stay, aiming to entertain his viewers with tales of the old house.

As days pass, Caleb experiences a series of inexplicable events, doors creak open on their own, whispers echo through empty halls, and shadows dart just beyond his line of sight. Initially attributing these occurrences to his imagination, Caleb's skepticism wanes when he captures a ghostly figure on camera during a live stream. His audience is both terrified and enthralled, urging him to delve deeper into the house's mysteries.

Driven by curiosity and the promise of viral content, Caleb investigates the mansion's history. He discovers that the house was built during the Spanish colonial era and has been the site of numerous tragedies, including unexplained deaths and disappearances. Local legends speak of an engkanto, a supernatural being that guards the house and punishes intruders.

Caleb's continued probing awakens the malevolent spirit residing in the house. He begins to experience vivid nightmares, and the line between reality and hallucination blurs. The engkanto, angered by Caleb's intrusion, traps him within the mansion, cutting off all means of communication with the outside world. As the haunting escalates, Caleb is forced to confront his deepest fears and regrets.

In a desperate bid to escape, Caleb uncovers a hidden chamber beneath the house, revealing the engkanto's origin and the dark rituals that bound it to the mansion. Armed with this knowledge, he performs a counter-ritual to banish the spirit. The process is harrowing, with the engkanto manifesting in terrifying forms to deter him. Ultimately, Caleb succeeds in breaking the curse, and the mansion begins to crumble around him.

Caleb emerges from the ruins, forever changed by his ordeal. He shares his experience with his audience, not as entertainment, but as a cautionary tale about the dangers of seeking fame at the expense of respecting the unknown. The film ends with a lingering shot of the now-destroyed mansion, hinting that some spirits may never truly rest.

== Cast ==
- Pepe Herrera as Lodz/Caleb
- Cassie Banks
- Johannes Rissler as Lucio
- Rolando Innocencio
- Karl Gabriel
- Melissa Jimenez

== Production ==
The production along with Pepe Herrera and the other cast are started filming in July 2021 and wraps up in August 2021. The cast are in a lock-in shooting because they are affected of Typhoon Fabian and COVID-19 pandemic in Sariaya, Quezon.

== Release ==
The film is scheduled to release in the Philippines on May 1, 2024, under Regal Entertainment.

== Reception ==
Goldwin Reviews gave the film a rating of -2 out of 5 rating and wrote: Wala silang naibigay na magandang impormasyon tungkol sa content creation at live streaming. May gusto silang sabihin tungkol sa kasikatan, pero sa sobrang panget ng pagkakagawa, hindi na yun mahalaga. Ito’y naging isang cheap na version ng black mirror. Ang chaka to the max ng pagkakasulat at ng pagkakadirek.

Stephanie Mayo of Daily Tribune also gave the film a negative review and giving it a 0 out of 5 rating, she said: It was literally a bizarre movie experience, as if Bantay-Bahay does not understand the genres of horror or comedy. Or, perhaps, Reyes, or Regal Films, released this just too soon, betting on Pepe Herrera’s stardom despite the movie’s half-baked production.
