= My Sassy Girl (2024 film) =

2024 Philippine film

- Theatrical release poster
- Directed by: Fifth Solomon
- Screenplay by: Toni Gonzaga; Fifth Solomon; Ho-sik Kim; Jae-young Kwak
- Based on: My Sassy Girl by Kwak Jae-yong
- Produced by: Mark Victor; Paul Soriano; Veronique Del Rosario-Corpus; Valerie S. Del Rosario; Vincent Del Rosario III
- Starring: Toni Gonzaga; Pepe Herrera
- Cinematography: Zach Cysip
- Edited by: Noah Tonga
- Music by: Len Calvo
- Production companies: TinCan; Viva Films
- Distributed by: Viva Films
- Release date: January 31, 2024
- Running time: 117 minutes
- Country: Philippines
- Language: Filipino
- Box office: ₱27 million

My Sassy Girl is a 2024 Philippine romantic comedy film loosely based on the 2001 South Korean movie of the same title. It stars Toni Gonzaga and Pepe Herrera. The film was released on January 31, 2024, under Viva Films.

My Sassy Girl was the final movie appearance of Joey Paras, who died on October 29, 2023.

== Premise ==
The movie tells the love story of Sheena and Junjee. Junjee just cannot seem to catch a romantic break. Their personalities stand opposite to the characteristics traditionally associated with masculinity and femininity in Asian societies in general.

== Cast ==
- Toni Gonzaga as Sheena
- Pepe Herrera as Junjee
- Yayo Aguila
- Bodjie Pascua
- Alma Moreno
- Boboy Garrovillo
- Joey Paras
- Benj Manalo
- Mark Christopher Israel

== Production ==
The film was announced in 2021. Filming and production completed in the same year.

== Reception ==
=== Box office ===
The film earned ₱5.2 million on its opening day and ₱27 million on its whole run.

=== Critical response ===
The movie received a score of 70/100 from 9 reviews according to review aggregator website Kritikultura, indicating generally positive reviews.

Goldwin Reviews gave the film 3 out of 5 stars and said, "Kinulang sa kilig ang palabas na’to dahil sa katangian at kilos ng mga karakter. Ngunit dahil sa mga biruan nila, nagkaroon ng saya. Dahil sa pagganap ng mga bida, nagkaroon ito ng puso. My Sassy Girl may not be that romantic and sassy, but it has enough comedy, drama and heart to consider it a decent film."

Fred Hawson of News.ABS-CBN.com, also gave the film a mixed reaction and rated it 6/10, remarking, "On their own, Toni Gonzaga and Pepe Herrera were very capable actors in both their dramatic and comedic scenes. However, there was not much real spark nor romantic thrill between them to excite or delight viewers when they were together. In any case, the way director Fifth Solomon handled the revelations building up to the ending was still able to make us root for the two of them to wind up together despite all the gaslighting and ghosting that went on."
