= Team Payaman =

Filipino content creator collective

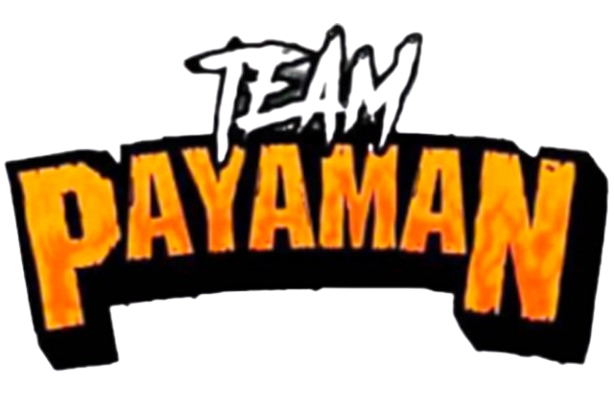
- Occupations: YouTubers; video game livestreaming; videographers; editors; vloggers
- Years active: 2015–present

YouTube information
- Channel: Team Payaman
- Subscribers: 542 thousand
- Views: 744 thousand
- Website: teampayamanfair.com

Team Payaman is a group of Filipino content creators founded and led by YouTuber Lincoln Cortez Velasquez, known by his username Cong TV, in 2015. The group is known for humorous videos covering a wide range of everyday life, with members who are also independent influencers. It has also ventured into esports and gaming events.

== History ==
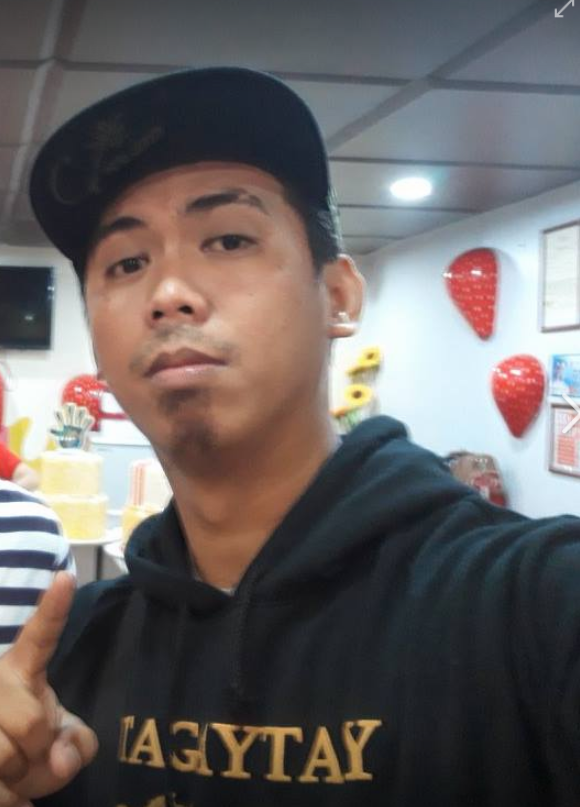
Lincoln Cortez Velasquez, also known as Cong TV, the founder of the group (pictured in 2017)

Team Payaman was formed in 2015 by Lincoln Cortez Velasquez, also known as Cong TV. The group started as a side venture and later grew into a professional content creation collective. Their content features humor based on everyday life and is relatable to many young Filipinos.

The group rose to prominence in 2020 during the COVID-19 pandemic. In November, Team Payaman entered esports by representing Happy Feet Emperors in The Nationals, the country's first franchise-based esports league. They also joined smaller tournaments to gain competitive experience. In 2021, Team Payaman launched a podcast titled Payaman Insider on Spotify, hosted by Junnie Boy, RogerRaker, Peachy Twice, and Boss Tryke. The show features stories from their daily lives, humorous experiences, and insights into being part of the group.

In 2022, several Team Payaman members supported the Philippine Mobile Legends: Bang Bang national team, Sibol, during the Southeast Asian Games in Vietnam, serving as supporters and "buffs". In 2024, several male Team Payaman members participated in the Star Magic All-Star Games at the Smart Araneta Coliseum. Cong TV coached Cong's Anbilibabol Basketball team against the Shooting Stars Blue team led by actors Donny Pangilinan and Ronnie Alonte, with a roster that included Junnie Boy, Boss Keng, Burong, Dudut Lang, Mentos, Bok, and other Team Payaman collaborators.

=== Controversy ===
Zildjian James Parma, nicknamed "Kulob" by Cong TV after the creator saw him holding a sign seeking help to achieve fame, suddenly left Team Payaman despite plans to produce a music video for his viral song "Ligaw Tingin". In a 2023 vlog, Parma addressed questions about his departure, explaining that he was escorted back to Albay and advised to complete his studies before returning. He also mentioned an incident where a Team Payaman member took offense to a joke he made about a social media influencer and admitted feeling jealous of Cong TV's first child with Viy Cortez. Parma discussed the unreleased music video and shared Cong TV's explanation for not releasing it. In the video, he was paired with Viy's younger sister, whom he had admired, though Cong TV was surprised to learn that Parma already had a girlfriend.

== Members ==
Core members

- Aaron "Burong" Macacua
- Anthony "Yow/Yoh" Jay Andrada
- Exekiel Christian "Boss Keng" Gaspar
- Jaime Marino "Dudut Lang" De Guzman
- Lincoln " Cong TV" Velasquez
- Marlon "Junnie Boy" Velasquez
- Marvin "DaTwo" Velasquez II
- Michael "Mentos" Magnata
- Patricia "Neneng Lamig" Velasquez-Gaspar
- Vien Iligan
- Viy Cortez

Other members

- Alvin Francisco
- Awi Columna
- Carlos "Bok" Magnata
- Chino Liu
- JM Macariola
- Josh Drake
- Josh Pint
- Kevin “Bin” Hermosada
- Kuya Inday
- Mervin Chester "Carding" Magsino
- Pau "RogerRaker" Sepagan
- Steve Wijayawickrama

Former member

- Emman Nimedez (died 2020)

== Events ==
=== Emman Nimedez tribute ===
In 2020, Team Payaman and Cong TV created two short films of their late Emman Nimedez to help raise funds for his family. The group split into Team A, which produced "Skyline", and Team B, which produced "Pop Love". Both films were uploaded to Cong TV's YouTube channel on August 31 and featured several Team Payaman members, honoring Nimedez's nickname "Pambansang Oppa" and his viral videos.

In 2022, two years after his death, Team Payaman members reunited to release an unreleased song in his memory. The track was uploaded to Nimedez's YouTube channel and completed with the help of his close friends Awi Columna, Kiyo, and Alisson Shore. The music video, directed by Titus Cee, featured his father, Daddy Louie, driving a jeep alongside several Team Payaman members, including Cong TV, Junnie Boy, Pau Sepagan (RogerRaker), Boss Keng, Yow, and others.

=== Other ventures ===
In 2023, Team Payaman held its first Team Payaman Fair, bringing together fans from various places, including those who traveled to support the group. Social media personalities such as Toni Fowler, Flow G, Angelica Yap, and Rana Harake were also present. The group continued to hold the fair in the following years.

In the same year, Team Payaman members Dudut and Pat Velasquez released a Christmas song titled "Araw-araw Lang Pasko", written and composed by Awi Columna and Cong TV.
