= Haunted Carnival =

- Directed by: Joey de Guzman
- Production company: Regal Entertainment
- Release date: December 25, 2026
- Country: Philippines
- Language: Filipino

Haunted Carnival is an upcoming Philippine horror slasher film directed by Joey de Guzman under Regal Entertainment.

== Premise ==
In 1986, a group of strangers attempts to escape and survive dangers in a perya (carnival) operated by a sorcerer.

== Cast ==
- John Arcilla
- Julia Barretto
- James Reid
- Fyang Smith
- RK Bagatsing
- Ronnie Alonte
- Maricel Soriano

== Production ==
Haunted Carnival is a film directed by Joey de Guzman under Regal Entertainment. It is the third installment of Regal's Haunted franchise following Haunted Mansion (2015) and Haunted Forest (2017). It was announced as the one of the four accepted script-based submissions for the 2026 Metro Manila Film Festival on July 7, 2026.

De Guzman choose the circus as the setting of the film since it is the "unlikeliest" setting for a horror work. He also drew from his own personal childhood fear of clowns. The cast for the film was announced at the latter part of July 2026, the actual perya to be used for the filming was also identified by around this time. By November 2026, principal photography has already started with cast members remarking how "physically and mentally exhausting" the filming process were.

== Release ==
Haunted Carnival will premiere in cinemas in the Philippines on December 25, 2026, as one of the official entries of the 52nd Metro Manila Film Festival.
