= Los Salvajes Bravos =

- Directed by: Paolo Dy
- Written by: Juan Ekis; Paolo Dy
- Produced by: Pauline Mangilog-Saltarin; Ernestine Tamana
- Starring: Romnick Sarmenta; Ruru Madrid
- Cinematography: Lee Briones
- Edited by: Jay Halili; Ernestine Tamana
- Music by: Teresa Barrozo
- Production company: Jesuit Communications
- Distributed by: Solar Pictures
- Release date: December 25, 2026
- Country: Philippines
- Languages: Spanish; Filipino

Los Salvajes Bravos is an upcoming Philippine historical drama film directed by Paolo Dy under Jesuit Communications. The film set in the latter years of the Spanish colonial era in the Philippines, tackles the journey of native Filipinos who became part of a human zoo at the 1887 Philippine Exhibition in Madrid, Spain.

== Premise ==
In 1887, Natives from the Philippine archipelago were recruited by the Spaniards, only for them to find themselves as part of a human zoo at the El Retiro Park.

== Cast ==
- Romnick Sarmenta as Ismael Alzate, an Igorot man who leads a group of indigenous Filipino people seeking opportunities in Spain
- Ruru Madrid as Purganan

== Production ==
Los Salvajes Bravos was produced under Jesuit Communications and was directed by Paolo Dy.

Work on the film began sometime around 2023 or 2024. The production team initially considered covering the human exhibitions at the Saint Louis Exposition in the United States. However the plan was changed to cover the lesser known Philippine Exposition in Madrid, Spain from June 30 to October 30, 1887. The team wanted to provide "Filipino perspective" to indigenous peoples exhibited in Madrid as they found out in their research that documentation available only came from the Spanish organizers.

The cast consist a mix of both Filipino and Spanish actors. Principal photography for Los Salvajes Bravos mostly took place in Spain. Twenty-two days of filming were spent in Madrid. Some scenes were shot in the Philippines. The film mostly uses the Spanish language with 60 percent of the dialogue being in Spanish. Filipino is the other language used in the production.

== Release ==
Los Salvajes Bravos will premiere in cinemas in the Philippines on December 25, 2026, as one of the official entries of the 52nd Metro Manila Film Festival.
