= Viy Cortez =

Filipino YouTuber (born 1996)

- Born: July 23, 1996 (age 30)
- Occupations: YouTuber; entrepreneur
- Spouse: Cong TV (m. 2024)

YouTube information
- Channel: Viy Cortez
- Years active: 2017–present
- Genres: Lifestyle; mukbang; game challenges; pranks; travel
- Subscribers: 7.15 million
- Views: 1.06 billion
- Last updated: March 2026

Viy Cortez-Velasquez (born July 23, 1996) is a Filipino YouTuber and entrepreneur. She is known for her lifestyle vlogs, mukbangs, game challenges, pranks and travel videos on YouTube. Cortez is married to Cong TV and a member of the content creator collective, Team Payaman. She was listed as one of the top YouTube personalities in the Philippines in 2020.

== Career ==
In 2015, Cortez was employed as a car agent when she met her then-boyfriend, Cong TV, who was an emerging content creator at the time. She eventually began appearing in his vlogs, although she initially exhibited shyness on camera. In September 2017, Cortez launched her own YouTube channel, uploading her first video titled 'Spicy Noodles Challenge with Cong & Junnie Boy'. This marked the beginning of her content creation career, which expanded to include game challenges, travel vlogs, pranks, and other lifestyle content. Her career gained significant traction in 2020 with the rise in popularity of Team Payaman, a content creators collective in which she is a core member. In October 2020, she became a brand ambassador for Ever Bilena. Throughout her career, she has pursued multiple business ventures spanning the cosmetics, apparel, and food industries, subsequently founding her own company, ViyLine.

== Personal life ==
Cortez was born on July 23, 1996, in San Pedro, Laguna, and has two sisters.

On December 12, 2020, Cortez learned that she was pregnant; Nevertheless, she began experiencing bleeding on December 18. In her YouTube vlog titled 'Blessing', she disclosed that she had suffered a miscarriage of supposed to be their first child with Cong TV. One year later, in December 2021, she announced through her YouTube vlog that she was expecting a child. In July 2025, she gave birth to her and Cong TV's firstborn.

In June 2024, Cortez and Cong TV got married.

== Filmography ==
=== Music video ===
Year	Title	Artist	Ref.
2021	"Habang Buhay"	Zack Tabudlo	
