= Omar Daniel =

Omar Daniel may refer to:

- Omar Daniel (composer) (born 1960), Canadian composer and pianist
- Omar Daniel (actor) (born 1995), Indonesian actor, presenter, and model
