= Jerald Napoles =

Filipino theater actor and comedian (born 1983)

- Born: Jerald Guillan Napoles; March 2, 1983 (age 43); Tondo, Manila, Philippines
- Education: Pamantasan ng Lungsod ng Maynila
- Occupations: Actor; comedian
- Years active: 1997–present
- Agents: Triple A Management / APT Entertainment (2010–2019); Viva Artists Agency (2019–present)
- Known for: Rak of Aegis
- Spouse: Kim Molina (m. 2026)

Jerald Guillan Napoles (Tagalog: [naˈpolɛs]; born March 2, 1983) is a Filipino actor and comedian. He is known for his role as Tolits in the musical stage play Rak of Aegis. He was previously a talent of Triple A Management and worked for GMA Network; he hosted and starred in the defunct weekly variety show Sunday PinaSaya.

Napoles signed with VIVA Artists Agency in November 2019, joining his longtime partner Kim Molina. He later joined the prime-time series Ang Probinsyano, marking his return on ABS-CBN.

== Personal life ==
Jerald Napoles finished high school at Florentino Torres High School in Gagalangin, Tondo, Manila. He studied chemical engineering at the Pamantasan ng Lungsod ng Maynila, but did not graduate.

In August 2024, Napoles and Kim Molina announced their engagement, 10 years after they first met at the PETA theater. They eventually married on March 1, 2026.

== Career ==
=== Early years: Theater career ===
Napoles who loves dancing fell into acting accidentally when his English teacher in high school, Ethel Rocha, ask him if he wants to join the production of a stage play musical. Jesus Christ Superstar was his first taste of theater when he accepted the offer. With the guidance of theater actor Arnold Reyes, Napoles auditioned for Dulaang UP's musical remake of St. Louis Loves Dem Filipinos and Tanghalang Pilipino's Noli Me Tangere musical. He also did a song from Zsa Zsa Zaturnnah Ze Muzikal. Since then, he had worked with almost all professional theater companies in the Philippines. His most popular role on stage was Tolits, the love interest of lead cast "Aileen" (played by Aicelle Santos and Kim Molina), where he alternated with Kapamilya stars Pepe Herrera and Benj Manalo in the hit Pinoy musical Rak Of Aegis.

=== 2010–present: Television career ===
His role as Jograd in the re-staging of the musical Magsimula Ka gave him the nod into starting his showbiz career in 2010. He became part of Triple A Talent Management when Jojo Oconer, the COO of Triple A, offered him to join their talent pool. He was part of the 2011 reimagining of the classic sitcom Iskul Bukol of TV5 where he played a student-janitor named Itor.

In 2012, following his break in Magsimula Ka, Napoles was cast in the musical Care Divas as Kayla, one of the five transgender Overseas Filipino Workers in Israel — the only straight guy to play one of the transgender divas in the musical's original run. The same year, he was part of the TV5's remake of the epic series Valiente.

Napoles got his big theater break in 2014 when he landed the role of Tolits in the comedy-musical Rak of Aegis where he received rave reviews from critics about his performance. He also played a meatier role on television when he transferred to GMA Network with his first project as Macario Sakay in the historical drama series Katipunan.

The following year, Napoles was included as co-host in the weekly variety show of GMA Network entitled Sunday PinaSaya along with Primetime Queen Marian Rivera, Comedy Queen Ai-Ai delas Alas and the comic duo Jose Manalo and Wally Bayola. He was also in the cast of My Faithful Husband playing the role of Mars, the gay confidante of the lead character, Emman, played by Dennis Trillo.

For a short period of time, Napoles was among the three "celebrity bluffers" in the season finale of the late-night comedy game show Celebrity Bluff. He became part of the romantic-comedy series That's My Amboy as Tope. He left GMA and returned ABS-CBN at the end of 2019; his first stint in ABS-CBN was in FPJ's Ang Probinsyano, where he currently portrays Jimbo Padua, a guest character.

== Filmography ==
=== Theatre ===
Year	Title	Role	Ref.
2000	Jesus Christ Superstar	—N/a	
2005	St. Louis Loves Dem Filipinos	—N/a	
2007	Zsa Zsa Zaturnnah Ze Muzikal	Itay Zombie	
2010	Magsimula Ka	Jograd	
2011	Noli Me Tángere	Elias	
2012, 2017	Care Divas	Kayla	
2014	Rak of Aegis	Tolits	

=== Film ===
Year	Title	Role
2006	Saan Nagtatago ang Happiness?	Tambay
2006	Ang Huling Araw ng Linggo	Lito
2009	Esclaves Des Mers	—N/a
2010	Magkakapatid	—N/a
2010	Dagim	Gorio
2011	Le Marquis	Le Garde du Tarmac
2012	Madaling Araw Mahabang Gabi	—N/a
2012	Melodrama Negra	—N/a
2014	The Janitor	—N/a
2014	In Darkness We Live	—N/a
2014	English Only, Please	Manliligaw
2015	You're My Boss	Bojeck
2015	Baka Siguro Yata	Gio
2015	#WalangForever	Tonypet
2016	Sins of the Wasteland	The Stranger
2016	Camp Sawi	Pilot / Camp Assistant
2017	Foolish Love	Rey Dela Cruz
2017	Northern Lights: A Journey to Love	James
2017	Haunted Forest	Voltron
2018	Jack Em Popoy: The Puliscredibles	Plt. James Reidentor Magpayo
2018	Ang Pangarap Kong Holdap	Toto
2019	#Jowable	
2019	Mina-anud	Carlo
2021	Kaka	Jorge
2021	Ang Babaeng Walang Pakiramdam	Ngongo
2021	Mang Jose	Charlemagne
2021	Sa Haba ng Gabi	Nhoel
2021	Ikaw at Ako at ang Ending	Martin
2022	Livescream	Double Side Coin
2023	Girlfriend Na Pwede Na	Isko
2023	Instant Daddy	Val Roxas
2024	Seoulmeyt	Park Jun-Jun / Juanito Mamaril
2024	Pagpag 24/7	Mitoy
2025	Sampung Utos Kay Josh	Josh
2025	Un-Ex You	Andre "Andy" dela Resma
2026	Wonderful Nightmare	Julian Alcantara
2026	Love, Ngo	Ngongo

=== Television ===
Series
Year	Title	Role	Notes	Ref.
2009	May Bukas Pa	Simon Valencia	Uncredited role / antagonist	
2010	Impostor	Don Manuel's Henchman	Uncredited role / antagonist	
2010	Mara Clara	Bogart		
2011	Iskul Bukol	Itor	Main cast	
2012	Nasaan Ka Elisa?	Cecile's henchman	Uncredited role / antagonist	
2012	Valiente	Domeng	Supporting role	
2013	Katipunan	Macario Sakay	Supporting role	
2015	My Faithful Husband	Mars	Supporting role	
2016	That's My Amboy	Tope	Supporting role	
2017	Impostora	Oliver Del Prado	Special participation	
2017	Super Ma'am	Esteban Golo	Supporting role	
2019	Inagaw na Bituin	Paul Isagan	Supporting role	
2019	Love You Two	Harrison Ford Batungbakal	Supporting role	
2019	FPJ's Ang Probinsyano	Jimbo Padua	Guest role / antagonist	
2022	Mars Ravelo's Darna	Fredo / Strength Man	Guest role / antagonist	
2023	Comedy Island Philippines			
2024	FPJ's Batang Quiapo	Ato		
2025	Incognito	Benjie Alcazar		
2025	Sins of the Father	Ismael Dimagiba		
2026–present	Sigabo	Tolits		

Variety shows
Year	Title	Role	Ref.
2015–2019	Sunday PinaSaya	Mainstay	
2015–2016	Sarap Diva	Co-host	
2016	Celebrity Bluff	Celebrity bluffer	
2016–2017	Superstar Duets	Contestant	
2017	All Star Videoke	All Star Laglager	
2021	It's Showtime	Guest judge	
2023–present	ASAP Natin 'To	Co-host / performer	
2024	It's Showtime	Guest / performer	

Anthologies
Year	Title	Note(s)	Role	Ref.
2014	Magpakailanman	Episode: "The Christopher Villegas Story: Siga Noon, Beki Ngayon"	Geraldine	
2015	Dangwa	Episode: "Friends 2 Forever"	Tonyo	
2015	Wagas	Episode: "Rambo & Mira Love Story"	Rambo	
2015	Wagas	Episode: "Tita Swarding & Betty Love Story"	Tita Swarding	
