= Love, Ngo =

- Theatrical release poster
- Directed by: Darryl Yap
- Written by: Darryl Yap
- Produced by: Vincent Del Rosario III; Veronique Del Rosario-Corpus; Valerie Salvador Del Rosario
- Starring: Jerald Napoles; Candy Pangilinan; Gina Alajar; Malupiton
- Edited by: Vincent Asis
- Music by: Joshua Felinciano
- Production companies: Viva Films; VinCentiments
- Distributed by: Viva Films
- Release date: June 3, 2026
- Running time: 83 minutes
- Country: Philippines
- Language: Filipino

Love, Ngo (sometimes stylized as Love, NGO) is a 2026 Philippine comedy film directed by Darryl Yap under Viva Films. The film centers around Ngongo a man with a cleft palate played by Jerald Napoles.

== Premise ==
Set before the events of Ang Babaeng Walang Pakiramdam, Ngongo is a hardworking man with a cleft palate who helps run his mother's burger stand. Ngo also deals with daily life and society with his friends who shares similar conditions. He volunteers at the Kanguso Foundation, a charity organization for people like himself and meets Scarlet. Ngo and Scarlet falls for each other. However Scarlet's family opposes the relationship due to Ngo's condition and social status.

== Cast ==
- Jerald Napoles as Ngongo, a hardworking man with a cleft palate who helps runs his mother's burger stand. He also works as a volunteer at Kanguso Foundation, which aids people with cleft palate. The character was first introduced in the 2021 film Ang Babaeng Walang Pakiramdam Napoles stated he went all-in with the portrayal for Ngongo, believing being too cautious would result to a half-bake performance.
- Candy Pangilinan as Queen
- Gina Alajar as Ngongo's mother
- Malupiton, a member of Ngo's friend group.
- Tata Daclan, a member of Ngo's friend group. An actor with a cleft palate in real life, this is his debut film.
- Jobelyn Manuel, a member of Ngo's friend group.
- Jack Argota, a member of Ngo's friend group.

== Production ==
Love, Ngo is a prequel of the 2021 film Ang Babaeng Walang Pakiramdam and focuses on Ngongo, a character with a cleft lip. Love, Ngo was directed by Darryl Yap under Viva Films. Yap has already anticipated controversy considering the approach to use comedy to depict a film centering on characters with disabilities. He has made people with actual cleft lips as part of the cast in a bid to ground the film. Subtitles were also included for the film. The production team describes the execution as "verbatim" and deliberately avoided correcting the dialogue of the characters with cleft palate.

== Marketing ==
When the film was still known by the name, Ngongo after the titular character. Promotional materials distributed in late 2025 received concerns and backlash. The National Council on Disability Affairs (NCDA) released a statement calling the film's then title and promotional materials as appearing "to make use of derogatory and discriminatory language" and that maintained a position that disability should not be "exploited for entertainment value or comedic effect".

== Release ==
Love, Ngo premiered in cinemas in the Philippines on June 3, 2026. The film was approved for release a month prior by the Movie and Television Review and Classification Board (MTRCB) after a "meticulous review" which had NCDA officials as part of the process in light of the film's controversy.
