= Pepe Herrera =

Filipino actor, singer, and comedian

- Born: Jose Nicolas Emmanuel Herrera; April 21, 1987 (age 39); Philippines
- Education: University of Santo Tomas Conservatory of Music
- Occupations: Actor; Singer; Comedian
- Years active: 2016–present
- Known for: Ang Probinsyano; Sakaling Hindi Makarating; Ang Pangarap Kong Holdap; Rewind
- Spouse: Sarah Mallari
- Children: 1

Jose Nikolas Emmanuel Pacifico Herrera (born April 21, 1987), known professionally as Pepe Herrera, is a Filipino actor, singer, and comedian. He gained prominence for his role as Benny in the television series FPJ's Ang Probinsyano and is noted for his versatility in both comedic and dramatic roles in film and television.

== Early life and education ==
Herrera was born in the Philippines into a musically inclined family. His mother was a songwriter, and his siblings were also active in the arts. He earned a Bachelor of Music Education, majoring in Voice, at the University of Santo Tomas Conservatory of Music, graduating cum laude. During his time at UST, he was a member of Coro Tomasino, the university's official choir group. Before joining showbiz, Herrera worked on a cruise ship, which inspired him to pursue acting.

== Personal life ==
Herrera is known for his humility and sincerity in acting. He continues to take on diverse roles and is widely respected in the Philippine entertainment industry.

=== Health ===
Herrera has publicly shared his long-term struggles with mental health, including battles with anxiety and depression attacks since he was 13 years old, as well as post-traumatic stress disorder (PTSD) and panic attacks. He shared that anxiety attacks intensified in 2023, severely affecting his sleep. In a 2024 interview with Toni Gonzaga, he revealed that a prior period of burnout led him to temporarily quit showbiz, attributing severe anger issues at the time to what a therapist later identified as a manic disorder. Following a recent mental breakdown, Herrera sought professional therapy for his condition, which he linked to abuses experienced in his early life. He strongly advocates for seeking professional help. As a result, he has stepped away from social media as of November 2025 and withdrew from Your Face Sounds Familiar season 4 after three rounds to focus on his recovery.

== Career ==
=== Environmental advocacy ===
Herrera is a committed environmental advocate. He regularly participates in clean-up drives and uses social media to promote eco-awareness.

=== Theater ===
Herrera began his acting career in theater and gained acclaim for his portrayal of Tolits in the musical Rak of Aegis. His performance caught the attention of ABS-CBN executive Charo Santos-Concio, which led to mainstream television roles.

Title	Role	Ref!
Rak of Aegis	Tolits	

=== Television ===
In 2015, Herrera joined the cast of FPJ's Ang Probinsyano as Benny, the comedic sidekick of Coco Martin’s character, Cardo. His portrayal became popular among viewers and boosted his television career.

He later starred in the sitcom My Papa Pi (2022), alongside Piolo Pascual and Pia Wurtzbach.

Year	Title	Role
2015–2017	Ang Probinsyano	Benny Dimaapi
2019	Jhon en Martian	Jhon
2019	Hinahanap-hanap kita	Homer
2019	Tawag ng Tanghalan: Celebrity Champions	Himself / Contestant
2019–2020	The Killer Bride	Iking
2020	24/7	Mario Estrella
2015–2021	Maalaala Mo Kaya	Danilo Nicola Jr. / Nestor / Aurora's Brother
2022	Dear God	Pastor Matthew
2022	My Papa Pi	Policarpio "Popoy" Papa Jr.
2022	Darna	
2022	One Good Day	Joey Rodrigo
2021–2022	Hoy, Love You!	Tommy
2023	Jack and Jill sa Diamond Hills	
2022–2023	The Iron Heart	Poseidon Abusado
2024	LOL: Last One Laughing Philippines	Himself / Contestant / 3rd place
2024	What's Wrong with Secretary Kim	Phillip Alvarez
2025	It's Showtime	Himself / Guest
2025	Masked Singer Pilipinas season 3	Himself / Foxtastic Samurai / Winner
2025	Eat Bulaga!	Himself / Judge in Eat Bulaga! segment The Clones
2025–2026	Your Face Sounds Familiar season 4	Himself / Contestant (Round 1-3)

=== Film ===
Herrera has appeared in various films showcasing his range as an actor, including:

Year	Title	Role	Ref!
2014	Dagitab	Mountaineer	
2014	Bonifacio: Ang Unang Pangulo	Filipino Worker	
2015	You're My Boss	Tupe	
2015	Heneral Luna	Manuel Luna	
2015	All You Need Is Pag-ibig	Waiter	
2015	WalangForever	Aldus	
2016	Always Be My Maybe	Bernard	
2016	Sakaling Hindi Makarating	Paul	
2016	The Super Parental Guardians	Totoy Buto	
2018	Da One That Ghost Away	Bagang	
2018	The Hopeful Romantic	Jess	
2018	Ang Pangarap Kong Holdap	Emman Durucut	
2019	3pol Trobol: Huli Ka Balbon!	Tolits	
2021	Princess DayaReese	Weda	
2021	Izla	Barber	
2021	Ikaw	Dong	
2021	Sanggano, Sanggago’t Sanggwapo 2: Aussie! Aussie (O Sige)	Gustavo	
2022	Day Zero	Timoy	
2023	Ma'am Chief: Shakedown in Seoul	Abraham Apostol	
2023	Rewind	Mang Jess / Lods	
2023	Family of Two	Paeng	
2024	My Sassy Girl	Junjee	
2024	I Am Not Big Bird	Prajak Tithi	
2024	Bantay-Bahay	Caleb	
2025	Sampung Utos Kay Josh	Satanas / Boss Jesus	
2025	The Last Beergin	Hilario	
2026	Home Along Da Riles Da Reunion	Baby Boy	
2026	Ang pinakamasarap na pares sa balat ng lupa	Don	

== Accolades ==
Accolades received by Pepe Herrera
Award	Date of ceremony	Category	Recipient(s)	Work(s)	Result	Ref.
2015 Metro Manila Film Festival	December 27, 2015	Best Supporting Actor	Pepe Herrera	WalangForever	Nominated	
32nd PMPC Star Awards for Movies	March 6, 2016	New Movie Actor of the Year	Pepe Herrera	WalangForever	Nominated	
CineFilipino Film Festival	May 19, 2016	Best Actor	Pepe Herrera	Sakaling Hindi Makarating	Won	
2023 Metro Manila Film Festival	December 27, 2023	Best Supporting Actor	Pepe Herrera	Rewind	Nominated	
2024 Manila International Film Festival	February 2, 2024	Best Supporting Actor	Pepe Herrera	Rewind	Won	
40th PMPC Star Awards for Movies	July 22, 2024	Movie Supporting Actor of the Year	Pepe Herrera	Rewind	Nominated	
2024 FAMAS Awards	May 26, 2024	Best Supporting Actor	Pepe Herrera	Rewind	Nominated	
Luna Award	2024	Best Supporting Actor	Pepe Herrera	Rewind	Nominated	
