= Cong TV =

Filipino YouTuber and entertainer (born 1991)

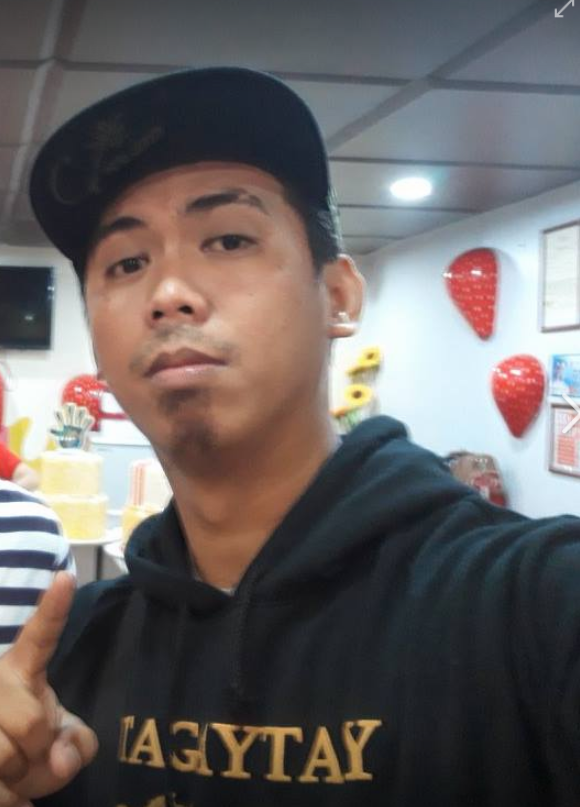
- Velasquez in 2017
- Born: Lincoln Cortez Velasquez; October 27, 1991 (age 35)
- Occupations: YouTuber; video game livestreamer; musician
- Height: 5 ft 10 in (178 cm)
- Spouse: Viy Cortez (m. 2024)
- Children: 2
- Relatives: Junnie Boy (brother)
- Musical career
- Genre: Heavy metal
- Instruments: Vocals; guitar
- Years active: 2018–present
- Member of: Coln

YouTube information
- Channel: Cong TV
- Years active: 2008–present
- Genres: Comedy; vlog; travel; gaming
- Subscribers: 12.6 million
- Views: 2.04 billion
- Last updated: March 2026

Lincoln Cortez Velasquez (born October 27, 1991), better known by his username Cong TV, is a Filipino YouTuber, video game livestreamer, and musician, regarded as one of the leading YouTube personalities in the Philippines. He gained fame for his comedic and relatable content and founded the content creator collective Team Payaman.

== Early life ==
Lincoln Cortez Velasquez was born on October 27, 1991, to Marlon Velasquez Sr. and Jovel Cortez Velasquez.

He grew up in the Philippines alongside his three siblings. During his high school years, he was reportedly teased by classmates because of his physical appearance, earning him the nickname “King Kong.” He later adopted the name “Cong” by removing the “King” and changing the letter “K” to “C”, which eventually became his online identity.

== Career ==
=== YouTube ===
Velasquez began creating and uploading videos in 2008, initially gaining attention through short comedic videos on YouTube and Vine. He later pursued vlogging more seriously and, in 2015, formed Team Payaman with his friends as they began creating content together. What started as a hobby eventually became a source of income and helped expand the careers of Velasquez and his fellow creators. The group later lived and produced content at Payamansion, a shared house where Team Payaman members stayed and created videos. Velasquez also diversified into video game livestreaming, covering titles such as PUBG: Battlegrounds, PUBG Mobile, Call of Duty: Mobile, Mobile Legends: Bang Bang, and Valorant. He has been signed with Tier One Entertainment since 2018.

On May 27, 2022, his YouTube channel reached 10 million subscribers. On September 25, 2024, Velasquez collaborated with American streamer IShowSpeed during his third Philippine stream, part of his Southeast Asia tour.

In July 2026, Velasquez won Best Comedy Show (Long-Form or Short-Form) and received the FAMAS Broadcast Arts Breakthrough Award.

=== Other ventures ===
Velasquez appeared on the 2016 ABS-CBN drama series My Super D and is the vocalist and co-lead guitarist of the metal band Coln, which he founded in September 2018.

== Personal life ==
Velasquez has three siblings: Venice, Marlon Jr. (Junnie Boy), and Patricia. Marlon Jr. and Patricia are YouTubers, each with more than one million subscribers.

In December 2020, Velasquez and his partner, vlogger Viy Cortez, suffered a pregnancy loss. They later announced another pregnancy, and on July 5, 2022, their son Zeus Emmanuel "Kidlat" Velasquez was born. They married on June 17, 2024, at L'Annunziata Parish Church in Muntinlupa, with internet personalities including Alodia Gosiengfiao attending. Their second child, Tokyo Athena, was born a year later.

== Filmography ==
=== Film ===
Year	Title	Role	Ref.
2025	Quezon	Cameo, Uncredited	

=== Television ===
Year	Title	Role	Ref.
2016	My Super D	Moby	

=== Music video ===
Year	Title	Artist	Ref.
2018	"Baliw"	Coln	
2020	"Lakas"	Coln	
2020	"Pake"	Coln	
2021	"Habang Buhay"	Zack Tabudlo	
2024	"Pulso"	Zack Tabudlo	
2026	"Lason"	Coln	
2026	"Wasak"	Coln	
