= List of feature films with transgender characters =

Symbol for transgender

This is a list of films with fictional and factual transgender characters. The films were released theatrically, direct-to-video, or on a streaming platform (OTT network).

This list does not include documentaries, which are included in the categories of LGBTQ-related films by decade, or animated transgender characters, which are noted in List of fictional trans characters. Various live-action films feature either transgender issues as a plot element or have trans men, trans women or non-binary trans characters.

Films are in alphabetical order by year of release. Titles beginning with determiners "A", "An", and "The" are alphabetized by the first significant word.

== 1900–1999 ==
=== 1900–1959 ===
Year	Title	Character(s)	Identity	Actor	Notes	Country	Ref(s)
1953	Glen or Glenda	Glenda	Trans woman	Ed Wood	Filmed when it was illegal for a man to crossdress as a woman in public.	United States	
1953	Glen or Glenda	Anne	Trans woman	Tommy Haynes	Filmed when it was illegal for a man to crossdress as a woman in public.	United States	
1954	Adam est... Ève	Charles Beaumont	Trans woman	Micheline Carvel	Likely the first French trans film, in which a boxer is "knocked out", then wakes up realizing she is a woman.	France	

=== 1960–1969 ===
Year	Title	Character(s)	Identity	Actor	Notes	Country	Ref(s)
1967	Caprice	Dr Stuart Clancy	Transgender	Ray Walston	Clancy is May Fortune's head chemist.	United States	
1969	Funeral Parade of Roses	Eddie	Transgender	Peter	Follows a group of transgender drag queens, Eddie and a few others, in the Japanese underground. The film has been described as "a documentary being made about Tokyo's gay culture". Even though it is a black-and-white drama film, it is said to have influenced the 1971 film A Clockwork Orange.	Japan	

=== 1970–1979 ===
List
Year	Title	Character(s)	Identity	Actor	Notes	Country	Ref(s)
1970	Beyond the Valley of the Dolls	Ronnie "Z-Man" Barzell	Transgender	John LaZar	Barzell is a flamboyant, well-connected rock producer.	United States	
1970	The Christine Jorgensen Story	Christine Jorgensen	Trans woman	John Hansen	A former Army private from the Bronx undergoes surgery and hormone treatments in Denmark in 1952 to transition from male to female. Based on Jorgenson's autobiography. (Jorgensen later unsuccessfully tried to get a restraining order to stop the producer's estate from exploiting the film.)	United States	
1970	Myra Breckinridge	Myra Breckinridge	Trans woman	Raquel Welch	Myra has undergone a sex change operation.	United States	
1972	I Want What I Want	Roy / Wendy	Transgender	Anne Heywood	An unhappy boy who tries to fulfill his "dreams of becoming a beautiful woman."	United Kingdom	
1972	My Dearest Senorita	Adela Castro Molina / Juan	Trans man	José Luis López Vázquez	Adela moves to Madrid and takes on a new masculine identity, "Juan".	Spain	
1972	Pink Flamingos	Trans flasher	Trans woman	Elizabeth Coffey	The nameless character shows up in a pivotal scene and is played by an actual pre-op trans actor.	United States	
1972	A Reflection of Fear	Marguerite	Trans woman	Sondra Locke	Marguerite suffers from what appears to be paranoia.	United States	
1972	The Triple Echo	Barton	Trans woman	Brian Deacon	A British soldier deserts his unit during WWII. At the suggestion of a woman named Alice, he meets while exploring the countryside nearby, he disguises himself as her sister to escape detection. Enjoying the experience a little too much, he agrees to accept the invitation of a soldier to attend a dance at the base, risking exposure.	United States	
1974	Freebie and the Bean	(Unnamed)	Transgender	Christopher Morley	Morley's unnamed character "Tranvestite" is a thief who gets riddled with bullets in the end. Vito Russo noted this film when explaining that while some progress had been made in Hollywood by this point, most lesbian, gay, bisexual, and transgender film characters were portrayed as viciously stereotypical, criminals or murder victims.	United States	
1975	The Day of the Locust	Nightclub Entertainer	Drag Performer	Paul Jabara	Jabara is LGBT in real life.	United States	
1975	Dog Day Afternoon	Leon Shermer	Trans woman	Chris Sarandon	Leon is Sonny's partner. Sonny is a first-time crook who tries rob a bank to pay for Leon's sex reassignment surgery, but his plan goes awry. It is also mentioned that Sonny has children with his estranged wife, Angie (this led critic Tim Robey to call Sonny a "bisexual desperado").	United States	
1975	Inside Out	Pauli	Transgender	Bernard Bauer	Ernst and Sly purchase a camera to photograph Maar with a transsexual named Pauli.	United Kingdom	
1975	The Rocky Horror Picture Show	Dr. Frank N Furter	Transvestite	Tim Curry	Brad cheats on his fiancée, Janet Weiss, with an alien, Dr. Frank N Furter.	United Kingdom	
1975	The Rocky Horror Picture Show	Dr. Frank N Furter	Transvestite	Tim Curry	Brad cheats on his fiancée, Janet Weiss, with an alien, Dr. Frank N Furter.	United States	
1977	Cambio de Sexo (Sex Change)	Maria Jose	Trans woman	Victoria Abril	The main argument of the film is the process of change of gender	Spain	
1977	Desperate Living	Mole McHenry	Trans man	Susan Lowe	A character who gets phalloplasty.	United States	
1977	Fun with Dick and Jane	(Unnamed)	Trans woman	Christian Erickson	Dick Harper is in an unemployment line behind a pre-op character telling the clerk that she needs the money for her "operation". When Harper first speaks to the clerk, he jokes insultingly about the extremely homosexual person in front of him, and gets harshly corrected by the clerk.	United States	
1978	In a Year of 13 Moons	Elvira Weishaupt	Trans woman	Volker Spengler	Weishaupt faces brutal cruelty on an everyday basis.	West Germany	
1979	...And Justice for All	Ralph Agee	Transgender	Robert Christian	Ralph is a young black cross-dresser arrested for a robbery, who is terrified of being sent to prison.	United States	
1979	Alien	Joan Lambert	Trans woman	Veronica Cartwright	In the sequel Aliens (1986) a biography very briefly flashes up on a computer screen in the background. The biography establishes Lambert as having had her gender altered from male to female. On the extras of a DVD presentation, one could see Lambert's full bio, which reads: "Despin Convert at birth (male to female). So far no indication of suppressed traumas related to gender alteration".	United States	
1979	Life of Brian	Loretta	Trans woman	Eric Idle	Loretta tells her comrades Reg, Judith, and Francis that she wants to be a woman, wants to have babies, and that it is "every man's right to have babies if he wants them." Although Reg is skeptical, Judith accedes to Loretta's request that she "can have the right to have babies" which Francis agrees to as symbolic of the struggle against the Romans, while Reg says it is part of Loretta's "struggle against reality".	United Kingdom	

=== 1980–1989 ===
List
Year	Title	Character(s)	Identity	Actor	Notes	Country	Ref(s)
1980	Dressed to Kill	Bobbi	Transgender	Michael Caine	Bobbi is a murderer. During the film's initial release, the activist group Women Against Violence in Pornography and Media distributed a leaflet denouncing the film's misogynistic and transphobic attitudes, arguing that "the distorted image of a psychotic male transvestite [sic] makes all sexual minorities appear sick and dangerous."	United States	
1980	Health	Esther Brill	Trans woman	Lauren Bacall	Brill was afflicted with narcolepsy who calls herself "the first lady of health while Garnell is serious against commercialism and materialism.	United States	
1980	Health	Isabella Garnell	Trans woman	Glenda Jackson	Brill was afflicted with narcolepsy who calls herself "the first lady of health while Garnell is serious against commercialism and materialism.	United States	
1981	Pixote	Lilica	Transgender	Jorge Julião	Lilica is framed for a murder.	Brazil	
1982	Come Back to the Five and Dime, Jimmy Dean, Jimmy Dean	Joanne	Transgender	Karen Black	Joanne is a window shopper.	United States	
1982	Forbidden Zone	René Henderson	Trans woman	Matthew Bright	Henderson is Squeezit's sister.	United States	
1982	The World According to Garp	Roberta Muldoon	Trans woman	John Lithgow	A former player for the Philadelphia Eagles who has gender re-assignment surgery. Roberta becomes the bodyguard of Jenny and one of the best friends of Garp. Based on the book of the same name.	United States	
1983	Sleepaway Camp	Angela	Trans woman	Felissa Rose	Angela is the killer and main character. (Springsteen took over the role in the two sequels that followed.)	United States	
1983	Sleepaway Camp	Angela	Trans woman	Pamela Springsteen	Angela is the killer and main character. (Springsteen took over the role in the two sequels that followed.)	United States	
1984	Fatal Games / The Killing Touch	Diane Paine	Transgender	Sally Kirkland	Diane is a murderer. After gender reassignment surgery Diane was disqualified from the Olympics due to testing positive for a significant amount of male sex hormones and kills other hopeful athletes out of jealousy.	United States	
1985	Kiss of the Spider Woman	Luis Molina	Trans woman	William Hurt	The character in the movie is not referred as a trans woman but a homosexual, still the character wears dresses and make-up.	Brazil / United States	
1986	Vera	Bauer	Trans man	Ana Beatriz Nogueira	Bauer (birth name "Vera") is a transsexual man who lives in a correctional facility for young people. After writing a book of verses about his life as a young troubled youth, he comes into his gender identity and begins to dress as a man, eventually falling in love with a woman and passing as cisgender to her family.	Brazil	
1986	Second Serve	Renée Richards	Trans woman	Vanessa Redgrave	The film is based on her 1983 autobiography Second Serve: The Renée Richards Story that was written with John Ames.	USA	
1987	Law of Desire	Tina Quintero	Transgender	Carmen Maura	Tina is Pablo's sister.	Spain	
1989	Sonny Boy	Pearl	Trans woman	David Carradine	Pearl is the adoptive mother of the main character, Sonny Boy. The other characters don't discuss her gender status.	United States	

=== 1990–1999 ===
List
Year	Title	Character(s)	Identity	Actor	Notes	Country	Ref(s)
1991	Soapdish	Montana Moorehead	Trans woman	Cathy Moriarty	Moorehead is formerly called "Milton Moorehead, of Syosset, Long Island" before transition.	United States	
1992	The Crying Game	Dil	Trans woman	Jaye Davidson	The plot revolves Dil, a girlfriend of one of the protagonists.	Ireland	
1992	The Crying Game	Dil	Trans woman	Jaye Davidson	The plot revolves Dil, a girlfriend of one of the protagonists.	Japan	
1992	The Crying Game	Dil	Trans woman	Jaye Davidson	The plot revolves Dil, a girlfriend of one of the protagonists.	United Kingdom	
1992	Just like a Woman	Gerald Tilson/Geraldine	Transgender	Adrian Pasdar	Tilson finds himself thrown out by his wife when she discovers women's underwear in their flat.	United Kingdom	
1992	Orlando	Orlando	Trans woman	Tilda Swinton	Orlando is a character whose sex changes after two-thirds of the film.	United Kingdom	
1992	Orlando	Orlando	Trans woman	Tilda Swinton	Orlando is a character whose sex changes after two-thirds of the film.	France	
1992	Orlando	Orlando	Trans woman	Tilda Swinton	Orlando is a character whose sex changes after two-thirds of the film.	Italy	
1992	Orlando	Orlando	Trans woman	Tilda Swinton	Orlando is a character whose sex changes after two-thirds of the film.	Netherlands	
1992	Orlando	Orlando	Trans woman	Tilda Swinton	Orlando is a character whose sex changes after two-thirds of the film.	Russia	
1993	The East Is Red	Dongfang Bubai / Invincible Asia	Trans woman	Brigitte Lin	Bubai is the primary antagonist. ("Invincible Asia" is the name given in the subtitles.)	Hong Kong	
1994	Ace Ventura: Pet Detective	Lt. Lois Einhorn / Ray Finkle	Transgender	Sean Young	An antagonist. The film has been heavily criticized for its portrayal of trans women, especially its stereotyping of the trans character as villainous and physically repulsive.	United States	
1994	Naked Gun 33 1/3: The Final Insult	Tanya Peters	Trans woman	Anna Nicole Smith	Peters is Rocco's girlfriend.	United States	
1994	The Adventures of Priscilla, Queen of the Desert	Bernadette Bassenger	Transgender	Terence Stamp	Bernadette performs a lip sync club act with two drag queens. Near the end of this cult film, Bernadette is shocked to learn that Anthony/Mitzi was not only once married to a woman but also has a son.	Australia	
1994	Skulhedface	Flopsy	Trans man	Bob Gorman	Flopsy is the vulva-faced lab assistant of Skulhedface. He is referred to with male pronouns.	United States	
1995	Bugis Street	Lola	Trans woman	Ernest Seah	Lola is one of the prostitutes inhabiting the Sin Sin Hotel on Bugis Street. Meng, the boyfriend of Lola, seduces Lin (a young female chambermaid and desk clerk at the hotel).	British Hong Kong	
1995	Bugis Street	Lola	Trans woman	Ernest Seah	Lola is one of the prostitutes inhabiting the Sin Sin Hotel on Bugis Street. Meng, the boyfriend of Lola, seduces Lin (a young female chambermaid and desk clerk at the hotel).	Singapore	
1995	To Wong Foo, Thanks for Everything! Julie Newmar	Chi-Chi Rodriguez	Trans woman	John Leguizamo	Chi-Chi wants to be seen and accepted as a woman by the local men.	United States	
1996	Close Your Eyes and Hold Me	Hanabusa	Transgender	Kumiko Takeda	Love triangle with a transvestite bar hostess, based on the manga Me wo Tojite Daite by Shungicu Uchida	Japan	
1996	Different for Girls	Kim Foyle	Trans woman	Steven Mackintosh	Two childhood friends who are reunited after one of them, Kim, has undergone sex reassignment surgery	United Kingdom	
1996	Escape from L.A.	Hershe Las Palmas/ Jack “Carjack” Malone	Trans woman	Pam Grier	Palamas is a past criminal associate of Snake's.	United States	
1996	I Shot Andy Warhol	Candy Darling	Trans woman	Stephen Dorff	Darling is best known as a Warhol superstar.	United Kingdom, United States	
1996	Killer Condom	Bob / Babette	Trans woman	Leonard Lansink	Babette is a chanteuse at Hotel Quickie who is a former colleague of detective Luigi Mackeroni.	Germany, Switzerland	
1997	Bent	Greta	Transvestite	Mick Jagger	The movie opens with a gay orgy, hosted by the transvestite Greta.	United Kingdom, Japan	
1997	Black Rose II	Chi-Mo's restaurant boss	Transgender	Kin-Yan Lee	Chi-Mo's boss is transitioning to female.	Hong Kong	
1997	Ma vie en rose	Ludovic "Ludo" Fabre	Trans girl	Georges Du Fresne	Ludo wants to live as a girl.	France	
1997	Ma vie en rose	Ludovic "Ludo" Fabre	Trans girl	Georges Du Fresne	Ludo wants to live as a girl.	Belgium	
1997	Ma vie en rose	Ludovic "Ludo" Fabre	Trans girl	Georges Du Fresne	Ludo wants to live as a girl.	United Kingdom	
1997	Midnight in the Garden of Good and Evil	Chablis Deveau	Trans woman	The Lady Chablis	Lady Chablis became a transgender icon and one of the first transgender performers to be received by a wider audience.	United States	
1998	The Adventures of Sebastian Cole	Henrietta Rossi	Trans woman	Clark Gregg	Henrietta has gender reassignment surgery, which is protested by her stepson, Sebastian.	United States	
1998	The Velocity of Gary	Kid Joey	Transgender	Chad Lindberg	Joey is a young deaf trans person who just arrived in New York.	United States	
1998	Woo	Celestrial	Transgender	Girlina	Celestrial is Woo's psychic friend.	United States	
1999	All About My Mother	Agrado	Trans woman	Antonia San Juan	Agrado is a transgender sex worker and friend of the film's protagonist, Manuela. Lola, the father of Manuela's son Esteban, is also a trans woman.	Spain	
1999	All About My Mother	Lola	Trans woman	Toni Cantó	Agrado is a transgender sex worker and friend of the film's protagonist, Manuela. Lola, the father of Manuela's son Esteban, is also a trans woman.	Spain	
1999	Better Than Chocolate	Judy	Trans woman	Peter Outerbridge	Judy is disinherited because of her gender transition and begins a romantic relationship with Frances, a lesbian separatist who owns a bookstore	Canada	
1999	Boys Don't Cry	Brandon Teena	Trans man	Hilary Swank	Brandon's life is threatened and becomes the victim of a hate crime. The movie received much media attention when its star Hilary Swank, who played Brandon, won the Academy Award for Best Actress.	United States	
1999	Flawless	Rusty Zimmerman	Transgender	Philip Seymour Hoffman	Zimmerman is a drag queen.	United States	
1999	Wild Zero	Tobio	Trans woman	Kwancharu Shitichai	The protagonist, Ace, falls in love with a transgender woman named Tobio he meets at a gas station on his way to a concert. He returns to her in time to rescue her from a horde of zombies and when the main character is conflicted about falling in love with a "woman who is also a man", Guitar Wolf tells him "Love knows no race, nationality or gender!"	Japan	
1999	But I'm a Cheerleader	Jan	Trans man	Katrina Phillips	The character is trans coded but not declared as such in the film.	United States	

== 2000–present ==
=== 2000–2004 ===
List
Year	Title	Character(s)	Identity	Actor	Notes	Country	Ref(s)
2000	Before Night Falls	Bon Bon	Trans woman	Johnny Depp	Bon Bon is a flamboyant trans woman who walks through the Cuban prisons, helping to smuggle a manuscript out of the prison.	United States	
2000	Gouttes d'eau sur pierre brûlante	Vera	Trans woman	Anna Thompson	Friend of the main character, she is introduced by a mention of having had a genital operation.	France	
2000	Woman on Top	Monica Jones	Trans woman	Harold Perrineau Jr.	Jones is Isabella's Afro-Brazilian friend.	United States	
2001	By Hook or by Crook	Shy	Trans man	Silas Howard	A queer buddy film written, directed by, and starring trans men, like Shy.	United States	
2001	Gaudi Afternoon	Frankie Stevens	Transvestite	Marcia Gay Harden	Frankie is actually a man in drag — or a "pre-op transsexual".	United States, Spain	
2001	Hedwig and the Angry Inch	Hedwig Robinson/Hansel	Trans woman	John Cameron Mitchell	A transgender German glam rocker recounting the story of her betrayal by her former boyfriend	United States	
2003	Beautiful Boxer	Nong Toom / Parinya Charoenphol	Trans woman	Asanee Suwan	Toom is a kathoey who becomes a champion kickboxer in order to pay for the sex change surgery and transition as Parinya Charoenphol. Charoenphol makes a cameo appearance as a beauty consultant.	Thailand	
2003	Chouchou	Chouchou	Trans woman	Gad Elmaleh	French comedy film about a maghrebin immigrant who settles in Paris. Chouchou finds a job at a psychiatrist office who allows Chouchou to come dressed in women's clothes. Chouchou also finds friends in a community of transvestites and trans women in Paris. Creator Gad Elmaleh has said his film might not have been received the same nowadays, he wanted to portray a character "who was authentic, with a true heart, for whom it is a tragedy not to be able to live as her/his authentic self. I'm afraid now [I'm not to using the right words]."	France	
2003	A Mighty Wind	Mark Shubb	Trans woman	Harry Shearer	Shubb has transitioned into a woman during the film.	United States	
2003	Normal	Ruth Applewood	Trans woman	Tom Wilkinson	A midwestern factory worker and closeted trans woman, who stuns her wife of 25 years, revealing that she wishes to have sex reassignment surgery, and changing her name to Ruth.	United States	
2003	Party Monster	Christina	Trans woman	Marilyn Manson	The film involves transsexuality in the character Christina.	United States	
2003	Soldier's Girl	Calpernia	Trans woman	Lee Pace	Based on the real-life story of the relationship between Private Barry Winchell and singer Calpernia Addams.	United States	
2004	Agnes and His Brothers	Agnes	Trans woman	Martin Weiß	Martin, who is now Agnes after having a gender-reassignment operation, works as a dancer and is suffering from unrequited love.	Germany	
2004	Bad Education	Zahara	Transgender	Gael García Bernal	Zahara is a drag queen whose birth name is Ignacio.	Spain	
2004	Wild Side	Stéphanie	Trans woman	Stéphanie Michelini	Main trans character played by a trans actress. The film won the Teddy Award in 2004.	France	

=== 2005–2009 ===
List
Year	Title	Character(s)	Identity	Actor	Notes	Country	Ref(s)
2005	20 centímetros	Marieta	Trans woman	Mónica Cervera	A narcoleptic trans woman during her transition from male to female.	Spain	
2005	Breakfast on Pluto	Patrick "Kitten" Braden	Trans woman	Cillian Murphy	Assigned male at birth, young Patrick, living during the Irish Times of Trouble, is later shown donning a dress and lipstick, which angers her foster family.	Ireland	
2005	Breakfast on Pluto	Patrick "Kitten" Braden	Trans woman	Cillian Murphy	Assigned male at birth, young Patrick, living during the Irish Times of Trouble, is later shown donning a dress and lipstick, which angers her foster family.	United Kingdom	
2005	Strange Circus	Yuji	Trans man	Issei Ishida	The novelist's assistant.	Japan	
2005	Tom-Yum-Goong	Madame Rose	Trans woman	Jin Xing	Madame Rose, the main villain, is a transgender woman in the international versions. The actress who plays Rose, Jin Xing, is also transgender herself.	Thailand	
2005	Transamerica	Sabrina "Bree" Osbourne	Trans woman	Felicity Huffman	Bree is a trans woman who goes on a road trip with her long-lost son Toby.	United States	
2005	The World's Fastest Indian	Tina	Trans woman	Chris Williams	Tina is a motel clerk that assist the main character in retrieving his motorcycle from customs and buying a car.	New Zealand	
2006	En Soap	Veronica	Trans woman	David Dencik	A film about the love between a (pre-operative) trans woman, Veronica, and a lesbian.	Denmark	
2006	Grilled	Loridonna	Trans woman	Sofía Vergara	A sultry trans woman who seduces unsuspecting Maurice when he and Dave, two desperate meat salesmen, knock on her door.	United States	
2007	Itty Bitty Titty Committee	Aggie	Trans man	Lauren Mollica	A comedy about young feminists who spread their message through public art and vandalism. Aggie is a trans man and he bonds with the main character, Anna, who recently broke up with her girlfriend and falls in love with Sadie, later developing an apparent crush on her.	United States	
2009	Powder Blue	Lexus	Transgender	Alejandro Romero	Lexus is a pre-op trans woman prostitute who shares an unexpected emotional bond with the priest Charlie.	United States	
2009	Paulista	Suzana	Trans woman	Maria Clara Spinelli	A lawyer who is the roommate of the main character.	Brazil	
2009	Strella	Strella	Trans woman	Mina Orfanou	A young transgender prostitute named Strella meets Yorgos when he is released from prison after 14 years of incarceration for a murder he committed in his small Greek village.	United States	

=== 2010–2014 ===
List
Year	Title	Character(s)	Identity	Actor	Notes	Country	Ref(s)
2010	Ticked-Off Trannies with Knives	Bubbles Cliquot	Trans woman	Krystal Summers	A rape/revenge "transploitation" film about a trio of trans women who avenge themselves on three men who brutally attack them and kill two of their friends. GLAAD stated that the film "misrepresent[s] the lives of transgender women and use[s] grotesque, exploitative depictions of violence against transgender women in ways that make light of the horrific brutality they all too often face", adding that the film conflated transgender identity with drag, which would create the impression in viewers unfamiliar with trans issues that "transgender women are ridiculous caricatures of 'real women'".while lead actress Krystal Summers said that the film "does not promote hate or violence against transgender women...[and is] a work of fiction and a revenge fantasy."	United States	
2011	Albert Nobbs	Albert Nobbs	Trans man	Glenn Close	Although born female, Albert has spent the last 30 years living as a man and meets Hubert, a painter who is also living as a man after escaping an abusive husband. Albert is living in 19th century Dublin and working as a butler.	United Kingdom	
2011	Albert Nobbs	Hubert Page	Trans man	Janet McTeer	Although born female, Albert has spent the last 30 years living as a man and meets Hubert, a painter who is also living as a man after escaping an abusive husband. Albert is living in 19th century Dublin and working as a butler.	Ireland	
2011	Austin Unbound: A Deaf Journey of Transgender Heroism	Austin Richey	Trans man	Austin Richey	The film mainly focuses on Richey’s deafness.	United States	
2011	Elvis & Madonna	Madonna	Trans woman	Igor Cotrim	The movie is about the romance between a trans woman and a cis lesbian	Brazil	
2011	Facing Mirrors	Adineh (Eddie)	Trans man	Shayesteh Irani	Rana and Adineh (Eddie), two people of different backgrounds and social class are brought together to share a cab ride. In the middle of their journey in the cab, Rana realizes that her passenger Adineh is transgender, and is planning on having an operation.	Iran	
2011	Gun Hill Road	Vanessa	Trans woman	Harmony Santana	A film about a recently released ex-convict coping with her estranged wife and daughter, Vanessa, who is going through transition from male to female.	United States	
2011	Romeos	Lukas	Trans man	Rick Okon	A drama and tragicomedy which revolves around the romantic relationship between Lukas, a 20-year-old gay trans man who is transitioning from female to male, and a cisgender gay man named Fabio.	United States	
2011	Tomboy	Mikäel	Trans boy	Zoé Héran	A 10-year-old AFAB child who, after moving with their family to a new neighborhood, introduces themself to their new friends as Mikäel. The film has been described as being about a girl who pretends to be a boy or, alternatively, about a transgender boy.	France	
2012	3, 2, 1... Frankie Go Boom	Phyllis	Trans woman	Ron Perlman	Phyllis is a hacker.	United States	
2012	Laurence Anyways	Laurence Alia	Trans woman	Melvil Poupaud	Alia is an award-winning novelist and literature teacher in Montreal, Quebec.	Canada	
2013	52 Tuesdays	James	Trans man	Del Herbert-Jane	The film centres on a teenage girl dealing with the gender transition of a parent.	Australia	
2013	Adult World	Rubia	Transgender	Armando Riesco	Amy moves in with her coworker Rubia and they become close friends.	United States	
2013	Dallas Buyers Club	Rayon	Trans woman	Jared Leto	Rayon is an HIV-positive drug addict.	United States	
2014	Boy Meets Girl	Ricky	Trans woman	Michelle Hendley	A trans woman from rural Kentucky, awaiting acceptance into a New York fashion design school, learns about acceptance, friendship, sexuality and love.	United States	
2014	Carmín Tropical	Mabel	Trans woman	José Pecina	An indigenous trans woman or muxe investigates the murder of her best friend.	Mexico	
2014	Pierrot Lunaire	Pierrot	Trans man	Susanne Sachsse	An adaptation of Arnold Schoenberg's Pierrot Lunaire that features a trans man in the title role.	Canada	
2014	Pierrot Lunaire	Pierrot	Trans man	Susanne Sachsse	An adaptation of Arnold Schoenberg's Pierrot Lunaire that features a trans man in the title role.	Germany	
2014	Predestination	Jane/John	Transgender	Sarah Snook	John is born female in a Cleveland orphanage.	Australia	

=== 2015–2019 ===
List
Year	Title	Character(s)	Identity	Actor	Notes	Country	Ref(s)
2015	3 Generations	Ray	Trans man	Elle Fanning	Teenager Ray is transitioning from female to male. Ray struggles with his mother and grandmother to get approved for hormone replacement therapy.	United States	
2015	Bill	Gabriel Montoya	Trans woman	Jim Howick	Trans woman who is one of King Philip's minions.	United Kingdom	
2015	The Danish Girl	Lili Elbe	Transgender	Eddie Redmayne	Elbe is one of the first known recipients of sex reassignment surgery.	United Kingdom	
2015	The Danish Girl	Lili Elbe	Transgender	Eddie Redmayne	Elbe is one of the first known recipients of sex reassignment surgery.	United States	
2015	Grandma	Deathy	Transgender	Laverne Cox	Deathy is Elle's tattoo artist friend.	United States	
2015	Tangerine	Alexandra	Trans woman	Mya Taylor	Alexandra and Rella are transgender sex workers	United States	
2015	Tangerine	Sin-Dee Rella	Trans woman	Kitana Kiki Rodriguez	Alexandra and Rella are transgender sex workers	United States	
2015	Two 4 One	Adam	Trans man	Gavin Crawford	Transgender man helps ex-girlfriend with her insemination, inseminates himself in the process	Canada	
2016	Absolutely Fabulous: The Movie	Patsy Stone	Trans woman	Joanna Lumley	Stone is redesigned as a trans woman in the movie.	United Kingdom, United States	
2016	Die Beautiful	Trisha Echeverria	Trans woman	Paolo Ballesteros	Played by a cis actor, Trisha is a trans woman who dies after winning a "gay pageant". She requests to be dressed up as various celebrities in her wake.	Philippines	
2016	Spidarlings	The Diva	Trans woman	Jeff Kristian	The film focuses on a lesbian couple, Eden and Mathilda.	United Kingdom	
2016	Apricot Groves	Aram	Trans man	Narbe Vartan	Aram is an Iranian-Armenian who has lived in America and returns to Armenia to meet his girlfriend’s family and ask permission to marry her, and to receive gender-affirming surgery in Iran.	Armenia	
2016	Tamara	Tamara	Trans woman	Luis Fernández	The film is about a successful lawyer who takes the decision to start a gender transition.	Venezuela	
2017	Close-knit	Rinko	Trans woman	Toma Ikuta	Tomo, 11 year old girl, goes to live with her uncle and his girlfriend, Rinko, who is a trans woman.	Japan	
2017	A Fantastic Woman	Marina Vidal	Trans woman	Daniela Vega	Marina works as a singer and a waitress in Santiago, Chile who is grieving the sudden death of her boyfriend.	Chile	
2017	They	J	Non-binary	Rhys Fehrenbacher	Drama about a teenager from an Iranian family living in the Chicago suburbs, who has to stop puberty blockers and decide whether or not to undergo a hormonal transition.	United States, Qatar	
2018	A Kid Like Jake	Jake Wheeler	Transgender	Leo James Davis	Jake is Alex and Greg's preschool age son.	United States	
2018	Assassination Nation	Bex	Trans woman	Hari Nef	Bex discusses whether or not LGBTQ people should be sympathetic to those "who enact policies to erase them."	United States	
2018	Every Day	Vic	Trans woman	Ian Alexander	Vic is one of the teenagers the spirit "A" experiences in.	United States	
2018	For Nonna Anna	Chris	Trans woman	Maya Henry	A young trans woman taking care of her ailing grandmother.	Canada	
2018	Just Charlie	Charlie	Trans woman	Harry Gilby	A young trans girl who loves to play football	United States	
2018	Girl	Lara Verhaegen	Trans woman	Victor Polster	A trans girl in training to become a ballerina. Over the course of the story she seeks hormone replacement therapy and sex reassignment surgery.	Belgium, Netherlands	
2018	Tracey	"Travis Tung" / "Tracey"	Trans woman	Philip Keung	Story about a married man and father whose craving for feminization increases, leading him to transition from male to female both mentally and physically.	Hong Kong	
2018	Voyez comme on danse	Serena	Trans woman	Sara Martins	Serena is a trans woman who has a relationship with a married man. The romance is secondary.	France	
2019	Adam	Ethan	Trans man	Leo Sheng	The main character is a straight cisgender man who is perceived as a trans man accidentally and who does not dispute that error until some time into the story. He is friends with a trans man, Ethan, played by Leo Sheng.	United States	
2019	Alice Júnior	Alice Júnior	Trans woman	Anna Celestino Mota	A trans girl who moves to the countryside.	Brazil	
2019	Bit	Laurel	Trans woman	Nicole Maines	Laurel moves to Los Angeles after graduating high school, looking to make a fresh start after transitioning.	United States	
2019	La Dea Fortuna	Mina	Trans woman	Cristina Bugatty	A white trans woman who is a friend of the main characters.	Italy	
2019	Lola (Lola vers la mer)	Lola	Trans woman	Mya Bollaers	A white trans woman suffers the loss of her mother and having to deal with her father whom she hasn't seen in a long time and who is not accepting of her trans identity. The actress is a trans woman.	France	
2019	Port Authority	Waye	Trans woman	Leyna Bloom	A black trans woman who participates in New York City's ball culture.	United States	
2019	The True Adventures of Wolfboy	Aristiana	Trans girl	Sophie Giannamore	Giannamore is a "mermaid" girl whom Harker befriends.	United States	

=== 2020–2024 ===
List
Year	Title	Character(s)	Identity	Actor	Notes	Country	Ref(s)
2020	Cowboys	Joe	Trans man	Sasha Knight	Trans boy Joe's troubled but well-intentioned father Troy takes off with him into the Montana wilderness, pursued by police, after his wife Sally, from whom he has recently separated, refuses to let Joe live as his authentic self.	United States	
2020	A Good Man	Benjamin	Trans man	Noémie Merlant	A drama about a French couple's wish to have a child that leads Benjamin, a trans man, to become pregnant because of his partner's inability to conceive.	France	
2020	Miss	Alex	Genderfluid	Alexandre Wetter	Alex has always wanted to be Miss France, they are now trying to accomplish that dream. The character is not presented as a trans woman but they could be described as a genderfluid person. There is a trans woman, Lola, played by a cisgender actor, who is a sex worker. The film has been criticized for its poor portrayal of the transgender experience, for being racist and treating the subject of sex work poorly.	France	
2020	Night Ride	Ariel	Trans woman	Ola Hoemsnes Sandum	Allan flirts with Ariel, but becomes upset upon learning Ariel's gender identity.	Norway	
2020	A Perfectly Normal Family	Agnete	Trans woman	Mikkel Boe Følsgaard	The story follows Emma whose parent is transitioning as a trans woman.	Denmark	
2020	Rūrangi	Caz Davis	Trans man	Elz Carrad	Caz Davis left his home in the small town of Rūrangi, abandoning everyone, and moved to Auckland to start his new life where he transitions. Years later, he returns to the town where he grew up for the first time as an out trans man. Elz Carrad is trans and this is his first role. He had no connexion to the trans community in New Zealand. The project was initially planned to be a five-part web series, but was later edited together into a feature film. They set out to create a film that was 'by us and about us', and that meant making sure the audience got to see trans-positive experiences in the film, and show that they have love for themselves, along with affection from friends, family and the community.	New Zealand	
2020	Valentina	Valentina	Trans woman	Thiessa Woinbackk	The film portrays the challenges of a young trans girl who faces difficulties in ensuring that her identity is respected after moving to a small town.	Brazil	
2021	See You Then	Kris Ahadi	Trans woman	Pooya Mohseni	Kris is a trans-woman from Phoenix, Arizona.	United States	
2021	Space Sweepers	Bubs	Transgender	Kim Hyang Gi	A group of space junk collectors discover a humanoid robot named Bubs. Some called Bubs a "trans allegory" rather than representation.	South Korea	
2021	Space Sweepers	Bubs	Transgender	Yoo Hae-jin	A group of space junk collectors discover a humanoid robot named Bubs. Some called Bubs a "trans allegory" rather than representation.	South Korea	
2021	West Side Story	Anybodys	Trans man	iris menas	Anybodys was originally written as a tomboy in the 1961 movie who yearns to be one of the Jets, and is played by a transmasculine actor in the 2021 movie.	United States	
2022	Anything's Possible	Kelsea	Trans woman	Eva Reign	A young trans woman attending high school.	United States	
2022	Dodo	Eva	Trans woman, non-binary	Tzef Montana	She is a sex worker and the ex of the protagonist.	Greece	
2022	Joyland	Biba	Trans woman	Alina Khan	A Pakistani trans woman who the youngest son of the family depicted in the film falls in love with.	United States	
2022	L'immensità	Adriana / Adri / Andrea	Trans boy	Luana Giuliani	Adriana experiences gender dysphoria and identifies as a male and goes by the name of Andrea (a primarily masculine name in Italian).	Italy, France	
2022	The People's Joker	Joker the Harlequin/Vera	Trans woman	Vera Drew	Unofficial parody of the Batman franchise starring a transgender Joker	United States	
2022	The People's Joker	Mr. J	Trans man	Tommy Haynes	Unofficial parody of the Batman franchise starring a transgender Joker	United States	
2022	The People's Joker	Poison Ivy	Non-binary	Ruin Carroll	Unofficial parody of the Batman franchise starring a transgender Joker	United States	
2022	A Man Called Otto	Malcolm	Trans boy	Mack Bayda	Malcolm is one of Otto's wife's students.	United States	
2022	Monica	Monica	Trans woman	Trace Lysette	Monica is estranged from her family. She returns home to care for her dying mother.	United States, Italy	
2022	Paloma	Paloma	Trans woman	Kika Sena	The film follows the life story of Paloma, a transsexual rural producer who dreams of getting married in church to her boyfriend, Zé, however, the local church does not allow the union to be made official	Brazil	
2022	Something You Said Last Night	Ren	Trans woman	Carmen Madonia	Ren is a trans woman on a vacation with her family. Film has been noted for telling a story that does not focus on trauma or conflict around gender identity, but simply places a transgender character in a drama film about normal family interactions.	Canada, Switzerland	
2022	They/Them	Alexandra	Trans woman	Quei Tann	Alexandra is a transgender female teenager who initially keeps her gender identity a secret in the conversion camp, Whistler Camp. Jordan is openly non binary and unashamed of their gender identity, which leads to them being ostracized by the camp's staff.	United States	
2022	They/Them	Jordan	Non binary	Theo Germaine	Alexandra is a transgender female teenager who initially keeps her gender identity a secret in the conversion camp, Whistler Camp. Jordan is openly non binary and unashamed of their gender identity, which leads to them being ostracized by the camp's staff.	United States	
2022	Women Talking	Melvin	Trans man	August Winter	Melvin has adopted a male identity after a brutal incestuous rape and now rarely speaks except to the colony's children	United States	
2023	20,000 Species of Bees	Lucía	Trans girl	Sofia Otero	Lucía is an 8-year old transgender girl	Spain	
2023	Here Comes the Groom	Wilhelmina	Trans woman	KaladKaren	The film features multiple body swaps including one involving the protagonist Rodrigo Jr. (Enchong Dee) and Wilhelmina.	Philippines	
2023	Manta, Manta: Legacy	Frau Winkler	Trans woman	Philippa Jarke	Winkler works at the driving license office and has recently completed her transition.	Germany	
2023	Marupok AF (Where Is The Lie?)	Janzen Torres	Trans woman	EJ Jallorina	Trans woman who falls victim to an online dating catfishing scheme. The film is based on the online dating experience of a real trans woman.	Philippines	
2023	Mutt	Feña	Trans man	Lío Mehiel	Feña is a Chilea-American trans man who is forced to reunite with three people from his past. His little sister, his father, and his ex-boyfriend.	United States	
2023	My Big Fat Greek Wedding 3	Victory	Non-binary	Melina Kotselou	Victory is the mayor of Vrisi, a village which features as the main setting of the film.	United States	
2023	National Anthem	Sky	Trans Woman	Eve Lindley	A cis man discovers a rural queer community.	United States	
2023	Next Goal Wins	Jaiyah Saelua	Transgender	Kaimana	Saelua is the first openly non-binary and trans woman to compete in a FIFA World Cup qualifier.	United States	
2023	Orlando, My Political Biography	Orlando	Oscar (Rosza) S. Miller	Transgender	The film explores the struggles of trans and non-binary people through Virginia Woolf's novel Orlando: A Biography, some of whom give their first name as Orlando, like those played by Oscar (Rosza) S. Miller and Janis Sahraoui.	France	
2023	Orlando, My Political Biography	Orlando	Janis Sahraoui	Transgender and Non-binary	The film explores the struggles of trans and non-binary people through Virginia Woolf's novel Orlando: A Biography, some of whom give their first name as Orlando, like those played by Oscar (Rosza) S. Miller and Janis Sahraoui.	France	
2023	Orlando, My Political Biography	Orlando	Liz Christin	Transgender and Non-binary	A pink-haired and sweet character who visits Dr. Queen (played by Frédéric Pierrot), a psychiatrist, while other Orlandos sit in the waiting room, trading stories, laughing, and talking about their hormones, where she was sent because her mother didn't like she was dressing in a feminine way, and says when asked if she's a woman, "I wouldn’t exactly say that either,” with the doctor referring to see this character as she is.	France	
2023	Orlando, My Political Biography	Orlando	Elios Levy	Transgender	One of the Orlandos who bonded with the Orlando played by Oscar (Rosza) S. Miller during the film and wears makeup, and an Elizabethean collar.	France	
2023	Orlando, My Political Biography	Orlando	Victor Marzouk	Transgender or Non-binary	One of the Orlandos in the film and part of the main cast.	France	
2023	Orlando, My Political Biography	Orlando	Paul B. Preciado	Trans man	Filmmaker, philosopher, trans man, and director of the film.	France	
2023	Orlando, My Political Biography	Orlando	Kori Ceballos (Note: also named Koriangelis Brawns)	Trans woman	One of the Orlandos in the film who is an activist and has a sign reading "Power to the People."	France	
2023	Orlando, My Political Biography	Orlando	Vanasay Khamphommala	Transgender or Non-binary	One of the Orlandos in the film, who wears feminine clothing.	France	
2023	Orlando, My Political Biography	Orlando	Ruben Rizza	Transgender or Non-binary	In one part of the film, this character meets Sasha in the snow, and wears an Elizabethean collar.	France	
2023	Orlando, My Political Biography	Orlando	Amir Baylly	Trans man	Of French Rwandan descent, he shows off his legs, wears a huge headpiece, and tells his story of how his relatives in Africa accepted his transition.	France	
2023	Orlando, My Political Biography	Orlando	Naëlle Dariya	Transgender or Non-binary	Wears a huge wig which is filled with tiny ships and is the film's costume designer.	France	
2023	Orlando, My Political Biography	Orlando	Jenny Bel’Air	Trans woman	An elderly trans woman in the film, who is denied a hotel room because their passport doesn't conform "with their gender identity." She was, previously, an icon of nightlife culture in the 1980s.	France	
2023	Orlando, My Political Biography	Orlando	Emma Avena	Transgender or Non-binary	An actor who plays Orlando in the film.	France	
2023	Orlando, My Political Biography	Orlando	Julia Postollec	Transgender or Non-binary	An actor who plays Orlando in the film.	France	
2023	Orlando, My Political Biography	Orlando	Arthur	Transgender or Non-binary	An actor who plays Orlando in the film.	France	
2023	Orlando, My Political Biography	Orlando	Lillie	Transgender or Non-binary	An actor who plays Orlando in the film.	France	
2023	Orlando, My Political Biography	Orlando	Eleonore	Transgender or Non-binary	An actor who plays Orlando in the film.	France	
2023	Orlando, My Political Biography	Orlando	La Bourette	Transgender or Non-binary	An actor who plays Orlando in the film.	France	
2023	Orlando, My Political Biography	Orlando	Noam Iroual	Transgender or Non-binary	An actor who plays Orlando in the film.	France	
2023	Orlando, My Political Biography	Orlando	Iris Crosnier	Transgender or Non-binary	An actor who plays Orlando in the film.	France	
2023	Orlando, My Political Biography	Orlando	Clara Deshayes	Transgender or Non-binary	An actor who plays Orlando in the film and is the film's music composer.	France	
2023	Orlando, My Political Biography	Sasha	Castiel Emery	Transgender or Non-binary	A feminine character who has a relationship with the Orlando voiced by Ruben Rizza, and shows top surgery scars at one point in the film.	France	
2023	Orlando, My Political Biography	Goddess of Hormones	Tristana Gray Martyr	Ambiguous	A goddess who has power over hormones and dressed in drag.	France	
2023	Orlando, My Political Biography	Goddess of Gender Fucking	Le Filip	Ambiguous	A goddess who has power over "gender fucking" and dressed in drag.	France	
2023	Orlando, My Political Biography	Goddess of Insurrection	Miss Drinks	Ambiguous	A goddess who has power over "insurrection" and dressed in drag.	France	
2023	Orlando, My Political Biography	Judge	Virginie Despentes	Ambiguous	Former lover of Preciado and confers "planetary, nonbinary citizenship" on the Orlandos at one point in the film.	France	
2023	Summer Solstice	Leo	Trans man	Bobbi Salvör Menuez	The film is about Leo, a trans actor, who reunites with his cisgender friend, Eleanor, who knew him before he started transitioning.	United States	
2023	Till the End of the Night	Leni Malinowski	Trans woman	Thea Ehre	Leni is a drug dealer who assists in a police mission to infiltrate an online drug-trafficking network.	Germany	
2023	Un homme heureux	Edith	Trans man	Catherine Frot	As Eddy, trans man, announces to his husband that he is trans and is going to transition, his husband, mayor of a smalltown, announces he is running again for the position. The film then follows the couple as Jean processes that news while Eddy continues with his transition. The film is a comedy.	France	
2023	Woman Of...	Aniela / Andrzej	Trans woman	Małgorzata Hajewska-Krzysztofik	Aniela is a Polish husband and father who begins experiencing gender dysphoria	Poland	
2023	Woman Of...	Aniela / Andrzej	Trans woman	Mateusz Więcławek	Aniela is a Polish husband and father who begins experiencing gender dysphoria	Poland	
2024	Castration Movie Anthology i. Traps	Various	Transgender	Various	Extensive cast of trans people with various identities	Canada	
2024	Emilia Pérez	Emilia Pérez / Juan "Small Hands" Del Monte	Trans woman	Karla Sofía Gascón	Pérez is an escaped Mexican cartel leader in undergoing sex reassignment surgery to both evade the authorities and affirm her gender.	France	
2024	Monkey Man	Alpha	Trans woman	Vipin Sharma	Alpha is the community leader of Yatana's hijra community, the transgender people who live in communities that follow a kinship system known as guru-chela system in India.	Canada, United States	
2024	Part-Time Killer	Melody Rose	Trans woman	Valeria Turner	Melody is struggling to pay her transition costs, and resorts to using a murder-for-hire app.	United States	
2024	Ponyboi	Charlie	Trans woman	Indya Moore	Charlie is a MC at a local club.	United States	
2024	Soul of the Desert	Georgina Epiayu	Trans woman	Georgina Epiayu	Trans indigenous	Colombia, Brazil	
2024	Stress Positions	Karla	Trans woman	Theda Hammel	Karla is Terry's best friend.	United States	

=== 2025 ===
Year	Title	Character(s)	Identity	Actor	Notes	Country	Ref(s)
2025	Another Day in America	Starling “Star” Smith	Trans woman	Domaine Javier	Star is explicitly introduced as a trans woman in the storyline, and her identity is acknowledged within the office banter, which helps address themes of acceptance, authenticity, and workplace diversity. Javier secured the role through a formal audition process, one of the few cast members not handpicked by the director, bringing a genuine presence and fresh energy to the character and the film.	United States	
2025	Castration Movie Anthology ii: The Best of Both Worlds	Various	Transgender	Various	The film features a trans cult in New York City.	Canada	
2025	Dreamboi	Diwa	Trans woman	EJ Jallorina	The main character, Diwa, is played by a trans actress. Similarly the director Rodina Singh is also a trans woman.	Philippines	
2025	Peter Pan's Neverland Nightmare	Timmy / Tinker Bell	Transgender	Kit Green	This version of Tinker Bell is a human woman kidnapped by Peter Pan years ago.	United Kingdom	
2025	She's the He	Ethan	Trans Woman	Misha Osherovich	This film is about Ethan discovering she really is a trans woman after she and her close friend pose as them to sneak into the girl's locker room. The film also features several other trans, nonbinary, and queer actors.	United States	
2025	Warla	Kitkat	Trans women	Lance Reblando	Featuring an all-transgender main cast, the film is based on the Warla, a group of trans women who allegedly kidnapped foreigners to fund their gender affirming care.	Philippines	
2025	Warla	Joice	Trans women	KaladKaren	Featuring an all-transgender main cast, the film is based on the Warla, a group of trans women who allegedly kidnapped foreigners to fund their gender affirming care.	Philippines	
2025	Warla	Warla member	Trans women	Serena Magiliw	Featuring an all-transgender main cast, the film is based on the Warla, a group of trans women who allegedly kidnapped foreigners to fund their gender affirming care.	Philippines	
2025	Warla	Warla member	Trans women	Valeria Ortega	Featuring an all-transgender main cast, the film is based on the Warla, a group of trans women who allegedly kidnapped foreigners to fund their gender affirming care.	Philippines	

=== 2026 ===
Year	Title	Character(s)	Identity	Actor	Notes	Country	Ref(s)
2026	Iván & Hadoum	Iván	Trans man	Silver Chicón	Iván is a trans man working at a greenhouse where he begins a romantic and sexual relationship with the Spanish-Moroccan woman Hadoum.	Spain	
2026	Dorothy	Subbu	Trans woman	Sananth	The film revolves around a man’s acceptance of his best friend’s transitioning as they travel to Northern India for the latter’s transitioning ceremony. However, the man is tasked by the latter’s patriarchal family to kill him off.	India	

== See also ==
- List of transgender characters in television
- Media portrayals of transgender people
- List of transgender-related topics
