= List of Philippine films of 2025 =

This is an incomplete list of Filipino full-length and short films, both mainstream and independently produced, released in theaters, cinemas, and streaming services in 2025. Some films are in production but do not have definite release dates.

== Box office ==
The highest-grossing Filipino films released in 2025, by domestic box office gross revenue, are as follows:

An entry film for Metro Manila Film Festival

Rank	Title	Distributor	Box office	Ref.
1	Call Me Mother	Star Cinema	₱392 million	
2	Meet, Greet & Bye	Star Cinema	₱305 million	
3	My Love Will Make You Disappear	Star Cinema	₱173 million	
4	Shake, Rattle & Roll Evil Origins	Regal Entertainment	₱140 million	
5	Quezon	TBA Studios	₱100 million	

== January–March ==
Opening		Title	Production company	Cast and crew	Ref.
J A N U A R Y	3	Teacher's Pet	VMX / Diamond Productions	Sigrid Polon (director); Apple Dy, Micaella Raz, Gold Aceron	
J A N U A R Y	10	Las Ilusyunadas	VMX / Pelikula Indiopendent	Roman Perez Jr. (director); Jenn Rosa, Angeline Aril, JD Aguas, JC Tan	
J A N U A R Y	14	Table For 3	VMX / The IdeaFirst Company	Ivan Andrew Payawal (director); Topper Fabregas, Arkin del Rosario, Jesse Guinto	
J A N U A R Y	17	Halimuyak	VMX / White Space Digital Studios	Bobby Bonifacio Jr. (director); Christy Imperial, Skye Gonzaga, Chester Grecia, Carlo Lacana	
J A N U A R Y	24	Hiram Na Sandali	VMX / Five 2 Seven Entertainment Production	GB Sampedro (director); Dyessa Garcia, Denise Esteban, Vince Rillon, Aerol Carmelo	
J A N U A R Y	29	Sampung Utos Kay Josh	Viva Films / Anima	Marius Talampas (director); Jerald Napoles, Pepe Herrera	
J A N U A R Y	31	Sponsor	VMX	Albert Langitan (director); Angela Morena, Micaella Raz	
F E B R U A R Y	7	Belyas	VMX / Five 2 Seven Entertainment Production	GB Sampedro (director); Audrey Avila, Denise Esteban, Dani Yoshida, Matt Francisco	
F E B R U A R Y	11	Bigayan	VMX / The IdeaFirst Company	Ivan Andrew Payawal (director); Mike Liwag, Jesse Guinto	
F E B R U A R Y	12	Paquil	Reality MM Studios / Resiko Entertainment Production	Lemuel Lorca (director); Beauty Gonzalez, JM de Guzman	
F E B R U A R Y	12	Ex Ex Lovers	Warner Bros. / Cornerstone Entertainment / Project 8 Projects	JP Habac (director); Marvin Agustin, Jolina Magdangal	
F E B R U A R Y	14	Online Selling	VMX / 3 Clubs Entertainment	Jaque Carlos (director); Arah Alonzo, Aria Bench, Andrew Gan	
F E B R U A R Y	19	Mananambal	Viva Films / BC Entertainment	Adolfo Alix Jr. (director); Nora Aunor, Bianca Umali, Kelvin Miranda, Edgar Allan Guzman, Martin del Rosario	
F E B R U A R Y	19	Lisik: Origin Point	PinoyFlix / Domniel International Films Production / Dominic Institute of Science and Technology	John Renz Cahilig (director/screenplay); Nika De Guzman, Grace Rosas Tayo, Jeremiah Allera, Rosemarie Smith	
F E B R U A R Y	21	Tokyo Nights	VMX	Joey Cruz Manalang (director); Alessandra Cruz, Benz Sangalang, Mark Niño, Arneth Watanabe	
F E B R U A R Y	26	Everything About My Wife	GMA Pictures / CreaZion Studios	Real Florido (director); Dennis Trillo, Jennylyn Mercado, Sam Milby	
F E B R U A R Y	26	The Caretakers	Regal Entertainment / Rein Entertainment	Shugo Praico (director); Iza Calzado, Dimples Romana	
F E B R U A R Y	27	Sosyal Climbers	Netflix / ABS-CBN Studios	Jason Paul Laxamana (director); Maris Racal, Anthony Jennings	
F E B R U A R Y	28	Walker	VMX	Lawrence Fajardo (director); Rob Guinto, Stephanie Raz, Vince Rillon, Mark Dionisio	
M A R C H	5	In Thy Name	Viva Films / GreatCzar Media Productions	Ceasar Soriano, Rommel Ruiz (directors); McCoy de Leon, JC de Vera, Mon Confiado, Jerome Ponce, Yves Flores, Aya Fernandez	
M A R C H	7	Kolektor	VMX / Alcazar Films / Blackbox Studios / NL Productions	Carlo Alvarez (director); Aiko Garcia, Nico Locco, Salome Salvi, Candy Veloso, Emil Sandoval	
M A R C H	11	Malagkit	VMX / White Space Digital Studios	Bobby Bonifacio Jr. (director); Lea Bernabe, Ashley Lopez, VJ Vera, Ace Toledo	
M A R C H	12	Lilim	Viva Films / Studio Viva / Evolve Studios	Mikhail Red (director); Nikolas Red (screenplay); Heaven Peralejo, Eula Valdez, Ryza Cenon, Mon Confiado	
M A R C H	14	Elevator Lady	VMX / Red Apple Manila	Rodante Pajemna Jr. (director); Aliya Raymundo, Albie Casiño, Vern Kaye, Zsa Zsa Zobel	
M A R C H	15	Co-Love	Puregold	Jill Urdaneta (director); KD Estrada, Alexa Ilacad, Jameson Blake, Kira Balinger	
M A R C H	15	Fleeting	Puregold	Catsi Catalan (director); Janella Salvador, RK Bagatsing	
M A R C H	15	Journeyman	Puregold	Christian Paolo Lat and Dominic Lat (directors); JC Santos, Jasmine Curtis-Smith	
M A R C H	15	Olsen's Day	Puregold	JP Habac (director); Romnick Sarmenta, Khalil Ramos, Xander Nuda	
M A R C H	15	Salum	Puregold	TM Malones (director); Allen Dizon, Christine Mary Demaisip	
M A R C H	15	Sepak Takraw	Puregold	Mes de Guzman (director); Enzo Osorio, Nicollo Castillo	
M A R C H	15	Tigkiliwi	Puregold	Tara Illenberger (director); Ruby Ruiz, Gabby Padilla, Sunshine Teodoro	
M A R C H	19	Postmortem	Square One Studios / WeCamp Entertainment	Tom Nava (director); Jai Asuncion, Agassi Ching, Alex Medina, Sachzna Laparan, Albert Nicolas, Francis Mata, Mike Lloren, Jennica Garcia	
M A R C H	21	Eraserheads: Combo On the Run	Warner Bros. / Dvent Pictures / WEU Event Management Services	Maria Diane Ventura (director); Ely Buendia, Buddy Zabala, Marcus Adoro, Raimund Marasigan	
M A R C H	21	Delusyon	VMX	Carby Salvador (director); Apple Dy, Ardy Raymundo	
M A R C H	26	My Love Will Make You Disappear	Star Cinema	Chad V. Vidanes (director); Patrick Valencia, Isabella Policarpio (screenplay); Kim Chiu, Paulo Avelino	

Color key

- – a Puregold CinePanalo Film Festival entry film

== April–June ==
Opening		Title	Production company	Cast and crew	Ref.
A P R I L	1	Habal	VMX / White Space Digital Studios	Bobby Bonifacio Jr. (director); Athena Red, Karen Lopez, JD Aguas, Jhon Mark Marcia	
A P R I L	2	Sinagtala	Sinagtala Productions	Mike Sandejas (director); Rhian Ramos, Arci Muñoz, Glaiza de Castro, Rayver Cruz, Matt Lozano	
A P R I L	4	Puri For Rent	VMX / LDG Productions	Christopher Novabos (director); Aiko Garcia, Roxanne de Vera, Van Allen Ong, Jhon Mark Marcia	
A P R I L	9	Un-Ex You	Viva Films / Studio Viva	RC delos Reyes (director); Kim Molina, Jerald Napoles	
A P R I L	11	Bangkera	VMX / PCB Film Production	Temi Cruz Abad (director); Micaella Raz, Zsa Zsa Zobel, Marco Mora, Chester Grecia	
A P R I L	15	Violet	VMX / Five 2 Seven Entertainment Production	Rainerio Yamson II (director); Aliya Raymundo, Christy Imperial, Dani Yoshida	
A P R I L	19	Fatherland	Bentria Productions / Heaven's Best Entertainment	Joel Lamangan (director); Roy Iglesias (screenplay); Allen Dizon, Cherry Pie Picache, Angel Aquino, Richard Yap, Max Eigenmann, Mercedes Cabral, Jeric Gonzales, Jim Pebanco, Kazel Kinouchi, Ara Davao, Bo Bautista, Rico Barrera, Abed Green, Iñigo Pascual.	
A P R I L	19	Samahan ng mga Makasalanan	GMA Pictures / Lonewolf Films	Benedict Mique (director); David Licauco, Sanya Lopez, Joel Torre.	
A P R I L	20	Tampipi	VMX / 3 Clubs Entertainment	Bobby Bonifacio Jr. (director); Sahara Bernales, Stephanie Raz, Victor Relosa	
A P R I L	25	Sabik	VMX / Infinity Talent Management	Dado Lumibao (director); Angela Morena, Athena Red, Benz Sangalang	
A P R I L	30	Untold	Regal Entertainment	Derick Cabrido (director); Enrico C. Santos (screenplay); Jodi Sta. Maria	
A P R I L	30	Isolated	Viva Films	Benedict Mique (director/screenplay); Juvy Galamiton, Shania Vonzel Obena (screenplay); Joel Torre, Yassi Pressman	
M A Y	2	Rapsa	VMX / Infinity Talent Management	Topel Lee (director); Micaella Raz, Vern Kaye, Shiena Yu, JD Aguas, Alona Navarro	
M A Y	7	The Last Goodbye	Mavx Productions / Black Cap Pictures	Noah Tonga (director); Daniela Stranner, Matt Lozano	
M A Y	7	In Between	Viva Films	Gino M. Santos (director); Sue Ramirez, Diego Loyzaga	
M A Y	9	Ligaw	VMX / Marvex Studios Inc.	Omar Deroca (director); Robb Guinto, JC Tan, Ali Asistio, Rash Flores	
M A Y	13	The Jowa Collector	VMX / Infinity Talent Management	Dado Lumibao (director); Zsara Laxamana, Anne Marie Gonzales, Itan Rosales	
M A Y	16	Ang Pamumukadkad ni Mirasol	VMX	Ambo Jacinto (director); Queenie de Mesa, Ghion Layug, Ralph Christian Engle	
M A Y	21	ConMom	Mavx Productions	Noah Tonga (director); Paolo Contis, Patrick Garcia, Empoy Marquez, Kaye Abad	
M A Y	23	Maninilip	VMX	Rodante Pajemna Jr. (director); Ashley Lopez, Aerol Carmelo, Chester Grecia, Rinoa Halili	
M A Y	28	Isang Komedya sa Langit	Kapitana Entertainment Media	Roi Paolo Calilong (director); Jaime Fabregas, Edgar Allan Guzman, Gene Padilla	
M A Y	30	Hiram	VMX / 3:16 Media Network / Vipe Studios	RL Peralta (director); Rica Gonzales, Cess Garcia, Itan Rosales	
J U N E	6	Pihit	VMX / Pelikula Indiopendent / JPHlix Films	Sigrid Polon (director); Christy Imperial, Denise Esteban, Angeline Aril, Victor Relosa	
J U N E	11	Only We Know	Star Cinema / Cornerstone Studio / AgostoDos Pictures / 7K Entertainment	Irene Villamor (director); Dingdong Dantes, Charo Santos-Concio	
J U N E	11	Cheat Day	Regal Entertainment	Jose Javier Reyes (director); Derrick Monasterio, Alexa Miro, Casie Banks, JC Galano	
J U N E	13	Kalakal	VMX / Pelikula Indiopendent	Roman Perez Jr. (director); Aliya Raymundo, Gold Aceron, Divine Villareal, Jero Flores	
J U N E	18	Flower Girl	The IdeaFirst Company / OctoberTrain Films / CreaZion Studios	Fatrick Tabada (director); Sue Ramirez, Martin del Rosario, Jameson Blake, Maxie, KaladKaren	
J U N E	20	Sorority	VMX	Sigrid Polon (director); Azi Acosta, Apple Dy, Rinoa Halili, Marco Mora, Julianne Richards	
J U N E	24	Bayo	VMX / Pelikula Indiopendent	Roman Perez Jr. (director); Ashley Lopez, Anne Marie Gonzales, Arnold Reyes, Nathan Cajucom	
J U N E	25	Song of the Fireflies	MQuest Ventures / Culturtain Musicat Productions / CMB Film Services / QC Film Development Commission / Hartman Communications	King Palisoc (director); Morissette Amon, Krystal Brimner, Noel Comia Jr., Rachel Alejandro	
J U N E	25	Unconditional	BR Film Productions	Adolfo Alix Jr. (director); Rhian Ramos, Allen Dizon	
J U N E	27	Sex on Phone	VMX / Infinity Talent Management	Bobby Bonifacio Jr. (director); Angela Morena, Matt Francisco, Zsara Laxamana, Kurt Kendrick, Shiena Yu	

== July–September ==
Opening		Title	Production company	Cast and crew	Ref.
J U L Y	4	Obsesyon	VMX / Great Media Productions	Jeffrey Hidalgo (director); Christy Imperial, Yda Manzano, Itan Rosales, Armani Hector, Jeffrey Hidalgo	
J U L Y	9	I Remember You	BENTE Productions	Boboy Yonzon (director); Valeen Montenegro, JC Santos	
J U L Y	11	Sipsipan	VMX	Rodante Pajemna Jr. (director); Micaella Raz, Lea Bernabe, Astrid Lee, JC Tan, Mark Dionisio	
J U L Y	18	Hipak	VMX	Philip King (director); Sean de Guzman, Athena Red, Anne Marie Gonzales, Stephanie Raz, Ivan Ponce	
J U L Y	22	Kandungan	VMX	Joel Ferrer (director); Rica Gonzales, Arah Alonzo, Nico Locco	
J U L Y	23	Magkapatid, Dreamers in Tandem	JPhlix Films	Jonathan S. Oraño (director); Elia Ilano, Adrian Cabido, Marnie Lapus, Dennah Bautista	
J U L Y	23	Sunshine	Project 8 Projects / Anima / Happy Infinite Productions / Cloudy Duck Pictures	Antoinette Jadone (director/screenplay); Maris Racal	
J U L Y	25	Maalikaya	VMX / Pelikula Indiopendent	Roman Perez Jr. (director); Jenn Rosa, Aliya Raymundo, Karen Lopez, Sheena Cole, Mark Dionisio, Ruby Ruiz	
J U L Y	27	Food Delivery	Voyage Studios	Baby Ruth Villarama (director), Chuck Gutierrez	
J U L Y	29	Tusok Tusok	VMX / Pelikula Indiopendent	Ronald Espinosa Batallones (director); Sahara Bernales, Margaret Sison, Queenie De Mesa, JC Tan, Ralph Christian Engle	
J U L Y	30	How to Get Away from My Toxic Family	OgieD Productions / KreativDen Entertainment	Lawrence Fajardo (director); Zanjoe Marudo, Susan Africa, Richard Quan, Sherry Larra	
J U L Y	30	Lasting Moments	Passion5 Studios	Fifth Solomon (director); Sue Ramirez, JM de Guzman	
J U L Y	30	P77	Warner Bros. / GMA Pictures / GMA Public Affairs / Clever Minds Inc.	Derick Cabrido (director); Barbie Forteza, Euwenn Mikaell, Gina Pareño, Rosanna Roces, JC Alcantara	
J U L Y	31	The Four Bad Boys and Me	ABS-CBN Studios / Lonewolf Films	Benedict Mique (director); Anji Salvacion, Gelo Rivera, Harvey Bautista, Dustine Mayores, River Joseph	
A U G U S T	1	Ligaya	VMX / Five 2 Seven Entertainment Production	GB Sampedro (director); Shiena Yu, Cess Garcia, Julianne Richards, Vince Rillon	
A U G U S T	6	Meg & Ryan	Pocket Media Films	Catherine O. Camarillo (director); Rhian Ramos, JC Santos	
A U G U S T	6	Lola Barang	Total Ace Media Productions / Silverjade Entertainment	Joven Tan (director); Gina Pareño, Ronnie Lazaro, Richard Quan, Alan Paule, Marlo Mortel, Mercedes Cabral, Donna Cariaga, Ronwaldo Martin, Jomari Angeles, Ahwel Paz	
A U G U S T	8	L: Langoy	VMX / Pelipula Productions	Jon Red (director); Rica Gonzales, Chloe Jenna, Victor Relosa	
A U G U S T	12	Trianggulo	VMX	Christopher Novabos (director); Skye Gonzaga, Vern Kaye, Astrid Lee, Marco Mora	
A U G U S T	13	Sa Likod ng Tsapa	Solar Pictures / POP Moviehouse / Newsline Philippines Productions	Editha Caduaya (director); Hansel Marantan, Colonel Stefanio Adrenicus Rabino, Christopher Miguel Saladero	
A U G U S T	13	Wild Boys	Viva Films / Bright Ideas Productions	Carlos Morales (director); Aljur Abrenica, Vin Abrenica, Nico Locco, Arwind Santos, Kristof Garcia, Rash Flores, Jimboy Martin, Billy James	
A U G U S T	15	Victoria's Silver	VMX	Mac Alejandre (director); Christine Bermas, Victor Relosa, Angelica Hart, Gold Aceron	
A U G U S T	19	Kontrabida	iWant / Mavx Productions	JR Reyes (director); Bel Ilag (screenplay); Rez Cortez, Bembol Roco, Dindo Arroyo	
A U G U S T	20	Posthouse	Viva Films / Studio Viva / Evolve Studios	Nikolas Red (director); Bea Binene, Sid Lucero, Rafa Siguion-Reyna, Ryza Cenon, Carlitos Siguion-Reyna	
A U G U S T	20	Mudrasta: Ang Beking Ina!	CreaZion Studios	Julius R. Alfonso (director); Roderick Paulate, Tonton Gutierrez, Carmi Martin, Awra Briguela, Elmo Magalona, Arkin Magalona, Celia Rodriguez	
A U G U S T	21	One Hit Wonder	Netflix	Marla Ancheta (director/screenplay); Sue Ramirez, Khalil Ramos	
A U G U S T	22	69	VMX / LDG Productions	Rodante Pajemna Jr. (director); King Abalos (screenplay); Aliya Raymundo, Quennie De Mesa, Ashley Lopez, Paula Santos, Juan Paulo Calma, Mhack Morales	
A U G U S T	27	Some Nights I Feel Like Walking	Black Cap Pictures / Daluyong Studios / Origin8 Media / Giraffe Pictures / Momo Film Co. / Volos Films / Lunchbox	Petersen Vargas (director); Miguel Odron, Jomari Angeles, Prince Argel Saycon, Tommy Alejandrino, Gold Aceron	
A U G U S T	27	Outside De Familia	Gridline Film Production	Joven Tan (director); Ruby Ruiz, Sheila Francisco, Gelli de Belen, Luis Alandy, Matet de Leon, Rey PJ Abellana, Peewee O'Hara, Dwayne Garcia	
A U G U S T	29	Sa Gabing Mainit	VMX / PCB Film Production	Topel Lee (director); Angeline Aril, Nico Locco, Candy Veloso, Je-Ann Tan Fortich, Ghion Espinosa, Mon Mendoza, Ardy Raymundo	
S E P T E M B E R	2	Bulong ng Laman	VMX / Pelikula Indiopendent	Tootoots Leyesa (director); Aiko Garcia, Marco Mora, Divine Villareal, Liana Rosales	
S E P T E M B E R	3	Beyond the Call of Duty	PinoyFlix Entertainment / LCS Film Production	JR Olinares (director); Eldrin Veloso (screenplay); Martin Escudero, Devon Seron, Maxine Trinidad, Paolo Gumabao, Martin del Rosario, Christian Singson, Jeffrey Santos, Mark Neumann, Alex Medina, Simon Ibarra, Teejay Marquez, Migs Almendras	
S E P T E M B E R	3	Ang Aking Mga Anak	Viva Films / DreamGo Productions	Jun Miguel (director); Hiro Magalona, Natasha Ledesma, Ralph dela Paz, Cecile Bravo, Prince Villanueva, Patani Dano	
S E P T E M B E R	5	L: Lakad	VMX / Pelipula Productions	Mervyn Brondial (director); Gold Aceron, Vern Kaye, Paula Santos	
S E P T E M B E R	10	100 Awit Para Kay Stella	Viva Films / Ninuno Media	Jason Paul Laxamana (director/screenplay); Bela Padilla, JC Santos, Kyle Echarri	
S E P T E M B E R	10	Magellan	TEN17P / Black Cap Pictures / Rosa Filmes / Andergraun Films / Lib Films	Lav Diaz (director/screenplay); Gael García Bernal	
S E P T E M B E R	11	Kontrabida Academy	Netflix / United Straight Shooters Media	Chris Martinez (director/screenplay); Eugene Domingo, Barbie Forteza	
S E P T E M B E R	12	Barurot	VMX / Potzu Bros Productions	Rodante Pajemna Jr. (director); Karen Lopez, Reina Castillo, Izza Watanabe, Paula Santos, Sheena Cole, JC Tan, Mark Dionisio	
S E P T E M B E R	19	Foreign Exchange	VMX / Quicksilver Films	Dominic Q. Cruz (director); Sean de Guzman, Sahara Bernales, Athena Red, Audrey Avila	
S E P T E M B E R	24	Selda Tres	Five 2 Seven Entertainment Production	GB Sampedro (director); Carla Abellana, Cesar Montano, JM De Guzman	
S E P T E M B E R	24	Jeongbu	Gutierez Celebrities & Media Production	Topel Lee (director); Aljur Abrenica, Ritz Azul, Empress Schuck	
S E P T E M B E R	24	Madawag ang Landas Patungong Pag-Asa (The Teacher)	New Sunrise Films	Joel Lamangan (director); Rita Daniela, Jak Roberto, Albie Casiño	
S E P T E M B E R	24	Altar Boy	New Radio Pictures	Serville Poblere (director); Mark Bacolcol, Shai Barcia, Pablo S.J. Quiogue	
S E P T E M B E R	24	Candé	ERK Film Production	Kevin Pison Piamonte (director); JC Santos, Sunshine Teodoro, Gian Pomperada	
S E P T E M B E R	24	The Ride	MQuest Ventures / Spring Films / Cornerstone Studios	Thop Nazareno (director); Piolo Pascual, Kyle Echarri	
S E P T E M B E R	24	Minamahal: 100 Bulaklak Para Kay Luna	Viva Films / Ninuno Media	Jason Paul Laxamana (director/screenplay); Ashtine Olviga, Andres Muhlach	
S E P T E M B E R	26	Mayumi	VMX / The Big Shot Productions	Sigrid Polon (director); Aliya Raymundo, Marco Mora, Salome Salvi, Gboy Pablo	
S E P T E M B E R	30	Kirot	VMX / Infinity Talent Management	Bobby Bonifacio Jr. (director); Jenn Rosa, Ashley Lopez, JC Tan, Rinoa Halili	

Color key

- – a Sinag Maynila entry film

== October–December ==
Opening		Title	Production company	Cast and crew	Ref.
O C T O B E R	1	Isla Babuyan	Solid Gold Entertainment	Jose Abdel Langit (director); Jessie Villabrille (screenplay); Jameson Blake, Paolo Gumabao, Lotlot De Leon, James Blanco, Nathalie Hart, Dave Bornea, Samantha Da Roza, Geraldine Jennings	
O C T O B E R	1	The Last Beergin	Cineko Productions / Obra Cinema	Nuel Naval (director); JC Santos, Pepe Herrerra, Zaijian Jaranilla, Xyriel Manabat, Cherry Pie Picache	
O C T O B E R	2	Out of Order	Viva Films (Note: It will be distributed to Netflix) / Studio Viva / Myriad Entertainment	Richard Faulkerson, Jr. (director); Alden Richards, Heaven Peralejo, Nonie Buencamino	
O C T O B E R	3	Bloom Where You Are Wanted	Cinemalaya Foundation	Nonilon Abao (director);	
O C T O B E R	3	Child No. 82: Anak ni Boy Kana	Cinemalaya Foundation	Tim Rome (director); JM Ibarra, Vhong Navarro, Rochelle Pangilinan	
O C T O B E R	3	Cinemartyrs	Cinemalaya Foundation	Sari Dalena (director); Nour Hooshmand, Cedrick Juan, Raquel Villavicencio, Angel Aquino	
O C T O B E R	3	Habang Nilalamon ng Hydra ang Kasaysayan	Cinemalaya Foundation	Dustin Celestino (director); Dolly de Leon, Jojit Lorenzo, Zanjoe Marudo, Mylene Dizon	
O C T O B E R	3	Open Endings	Cinemalaya Foundation	Nigel Santos, Keavy Vicente (directors); Janella Salvador, Klea Pineda, Jasmine Curtis-Smith	
O C T O B E R	3	Padamlágan (Last Night)	Cinemalaya Foundation	Jenn Romano (director); Ely Buendia, Esteban Mara, Sue Prado	
O C T O B E R	3	Paglilitis	Cinemalaya Foundation	Chezka Marfori, Raymund Barcelon (directors); Rissey Reyes-Robinson, Eula Valdez, Leo Martinez, Jackie Lou Blanco	
O C T O B E R	3	Raging	Cinemalaya Foundation	Ryan Machado (director); Elijah Canlas, Ron Angeles, Reynald Raisel Santos, Glenn Sevilla Mas	
O C T O B E R	3	Republika ng Pipolipinas	Cinemalaya Foundation	Renei Dimla (director); Geraldine Villamil, Alessandra de Rossi, Kakki Teodoro	
O C T O B E R	3	Warla	Cinemalaya Foundation	Kevin Alambra (director); Jervi Wrightson, Lance Reblando, Dimples Romana	
O C T O B E R	3	Basang-Basa	VMX / Center Stage Productions	Freidric Macapagal Cortez (director); Sean de Guzman, Je Ann Fortich, Christy Imperial	
O C T O B E R	10	L: Lipad	VMX / Pelipula Productions	Dennis Empalmado (director); Ashley Lopez, Aerol Carmelo	
O C T O B E R	15	Quezon	TBA Studios	Jerrold Tarog (director); Jericho Rosales, Benjamin Alves, Mon Confiado, Iain Glen	
O C T O B E R	15	The Marianas Web	Crystalsky Entertainment	Marco Calvise (director); Sahara Bernales, Alexa Ocampo, Ruben Maria Soriquez	
O C T O B E R	16	The Time That Remains	Netflix / Black Cap Pictures	Adolfo Alix Jr. (director); Carlo Aquino, Jasmine Curtis-Smith, Bing Pimentel, Beauty Gonzalez, Bembol Roco	
O C T O B E R	17	Romance Reboot	iWant / Mavx Productions	Jules Katanyag (director); Chan Santos (screenplay); Emilio Daez, Kaori Oinuma, Shanaia Gomez	
O C T O B E R	17	Paalam, Salamat	VMX / Infinity Talent Management	Bobby Bonifacio Jr. (director); Rinoa Halili, Ruby Ruiz, Ghion Espinosa, Arnold Reyes, Mark Dionisio, Ralph Christian Engle, VJ Vera, Roxanne de Vera	
O C T O B E R	22	Everyone Knows Every Juan	Viva Films / A World of Our Own	Alessandra De Rossi (director); Edu Manzano, Joel Torre, Gina Alajar, Alessandra De Rossi, JM De Guzman, Ronnie Lazaro, Ruby Ruiz, Angeli Bayani, Kelvin Miranda	
O C T O B E R	22	Walong Libong Piso	BenTria Productions	Dante Balboa (director/screenplay); Paolo Gumabao, Jhon Mark Marcia, Juan Paulo Calma, Drei Arias	
O C T O B E R	22	Ang Lihim ni Maria Makinang	CineSilip Film Festival	Gian Arre (director); Gold Aceron, Aiko Garcia, Mercedes Cabral, Micaella Raz, Christy Imperial, Leandro Baldemor	
O C T O B E R	22	Babae sa Butas	CineSilip Film Festival	Rance Añonuevo-Cariño (director); Van Allen Ong, Vern Kaye, Karen Lopez, Arah Alonzo, Skye Gonzaga	
O C T O B E R	22	Dreamboi	CineSilip Film Festival	Rodina Singh (director); Tony Labrusca, EJ Jallorina, Jenn Rosa. Iyah Mina, Migs Almendras	
O C T O B E R	22	Haplos sa Hangin	CineSilip Film Festival	Mikko Baldoza (director); Martin del Rosario, Denise Esteban, Angelica Cervantes	
O C T O B E R	22	Maria Asama: Da Best P*Rn Star	CineSilip Film Festival	Alan Habon (director); Albie Casiño, Dani Yoshida, Chloe Jenna	
O C T O B E R	22	Pagdaong	CineSilip Film Festival	Pongs Leonardo (director); Angela Morena, Astrid Lee, Ashley Lopez, Chester Grecia	
O C T O B E R	22	Salikmata	CineSilip Film Festival	BC Amparado (director); Aliya Raymundo, Aerol Carmelo, VJ Vera, Jeffrey Hidalgo, Rinoa Halili	
O C T O B E R	23	The Delivery Rider	Netflix (Note: Distributed as exclusive and not a Netflix original.) / Studio Three Sixty	Lester Pimentel Ong (director); Henry King Quitain (screenplay); Baron Geisler, Jake Cuenca, Euwenn Mikaell, Jennica Garcia, JC Alcantara	
O C T O B E R	24	Sem Break	VMX / 3:16 Media Network	Sid Pascua (director); Christine Bermas, Jenn Rosa, Rica Gonzales, Itan Rosales, Mon Mendoza	
O C T O B E R	28	Unli Pop	VMX / Infinity Talent Management	Topel Lee (director); Micaella Raz, Julianne Richards, Marco Gomez, JD Aguas	
O C T O B E R	29	Near Death	Diamond Productions / CMB Film Services / RVS Studios	Richard V. Somes (director); Charlie Dizon, Xyriel Manabat, RK Bagatsing, Soliman Cruz, Joel Torre, Lotlot De Leon	
O C T O B E R	31	Mamasan	VMX / PCB Productions	Topel Lee (director); Aliya Raymundo, Yda Manzano, Van Allen Ong, Jana Cuervo	
N O V E M B E R	5	Lakambini: Gregoria De Jesús	Pelikulove / Giya Studios	Arjanmar H. Rebeta (director); Lovi Poe, Rocco Nacino, Paulo Avelino	
N O V E M B E R	7	Nympho	VMX / Center Stage Productions	Freidric Macapagal Cortez (director); Jenn Rosa, Vince Rillon	
N O V E M B E R	12	Meet, Greet, & Bye	ABS-CBN Studios / Star Cinema	Cathy Garcia-Sampana (director); Maricel Soriano, Piolo Pascual, Joshua Garcia, Belle Mariano, Juan Karlos Labajo	
N O V E M B E R	14	Madulas	VMX / PCB Productions	Rodante Y. Pajemna Jr. (director); Astrid Lee, Cheena Dizon, Liana Rosales, Rhea Montemayor, Marco Mora, Chester Grecia	
N O V E M B E R	19	Finding Santos	SBTown / GV Entertainment Production	Son Hyun-woo (director); Maeg Medina, Jang Theo, Park Sung-in, Hans Galendez	
N O V E M B E R	21	Akin Ang Gabi	VMX / Real to Reel Studios	Joel Ferrer (director); Queenie de Mesa, Victor Relosa, Trish Gaden, Allen Legazpi	
N O V E M B E R	25	Next Room Affair	VMX / LDG Productions	Christopher Novabos (director); King Abalos (screenplay); Karen Lopez, Mhack Morales, Paula Santos, Julianne Richards, Roxanne de Vera, Krista Miller, Joko Rivera, Margaret Sison	
N O V E M B E R	26	KMJS Gabi ng Lagim: The Movie	GMA Pictures / GMA Public Affairs	King Mark Baco, Yam Laranas, Dodo Dayao (director); Jessica Soho, Jillian Ward, Sanya Lopez, Elijah Canlas, Miguel Tanfelix, Ashley Ortega, Martin del Rosario	
N O V E M B E R	26	Salvageland	Viva Films / Studio Viva / Rein Entertainment	Lino Cayetano (director); Richard Gomez, Angela Morena, Mon Confiado, Elijah Canlas, Cindy Miranda, McCoy de Leon	
N O V E M B E R	28	Balahibong Pusa	VMX / Pelikula Indiopendent	Roman Perez Jr. (director); Margaret Diaz, Christine Bermas, Itan Rosales, Mark Anthony Fernandez, Yda Manzano	
D E C E M B E R	3	Jackstone 5	Apex Creative Production	Joel Lamangan (director); Joel Lamangan, Eric Quizon, Gardo Versoza, Arnel Ignacio, Jim Pebanco	
D E C E M B E R	3	Ang Happy Homes ni Diane Hilario	KreativDen Entertainment	Marlon N. Rivera (director); Angeline Quinto, Eugene Domingo, Paolo Contis, Richard Yap, Luis Alandy	
D E C E M B E R	3	Nasaan si Hesus?	Balin Remejus Inc. / Great Media Productions	Dennis Marasigan (director); Janno Gibbs, Rachel Alejandro, Geneva Cruz, Jeffrey Hidalgo, Marissa Sanchez, Salome Salvi, Via Antonio, Chloe Jenna, Cecil Paz, Rachel Gabreza, Giani Sarita, Bembol Roco, Jerald Napoles	
D E C E M B E R	4	Sana Sinabi Mo	Netflix / Project 8 Projects	Shaira Advincula-Antonio (director); Juan Karlos Labajo, JC Santos	
D E C E M B E R	5	Kapag Tumayo Ang Testigo	VMX	JR Reyes (director); Nico Locco, Audrey Avila, Divine Villareal, Mark Dionisio, Rhea Montemayor, Chelsea Ylore, Mitoy Yonting	
D E C E M B E R	7	Opposites (Almost) Attract	Sager Studios	Luis Ruiz (director); Michael Sager, AZ Martinez	
D E C E M B E R	8	The Last Resort	iWant / Mavx Productions	Christian Paolo Lat (director); Karina Bautista, Aljon Mendoza	
D E C E M B E R	10	The Heart of Music	Utmost Creatives Motion Pictures / YourPost Entertainment Production	Paolo Bertola (director); Robert Sena, Gladys Reyes, Isay Alvarez, Angel Guardian, Jon Lucas, Elijah Alejo, Sean Lucas	
D E C E M B E R	17	Mandirigma	Viva Films	Danny Marquez, Jose "Jr" Olinares (directors); Angeli Khang, Sahil Khan	
D E C E M B E R	19	Ekis	VMX	Christian Paolo Lat (director); Aliya Raymundo, Angela Morena, Astrid Lee, Yda Manzano, Arnold Reyes, Ralph Christian Engle, Cheena Dizon	
D E C E M B E R	25	Call Me Mother	Star Cinema / The IdeaFirst Company / Viva Films	Jun Lana (director); Vice Ganda, Nadine Lustre	
D E C E M B E R	25	Rekonek	Reality MM Studios / The Th3rd Floor	Jade Castro (director); Gerald Anderson, Carmina Villarroel, Zoren Legaspi, Gloria Diaz, Alexa Miro	
D E C E M B E R	25	Manila's Finest	MQuest Ventures / Cignal TV / Spring Films	Raymond Red (director); Piolo Pascual, Rica Peralejo, Enrique Gil, Ashtine Olviga	
D E C E M B E R	25	Shake, Rattle & Roll Evil Origins	Regal Entertainment	Shugo Praico, Joey de Guzman, Ian Loreños (directors); Ivana Alawi, Fyang Smith, JM Ibarra, Loisa Andalio, Ashley Ortega, Ysabel Ortega, Carla Abellana, Manilyn Reynes, Janice de Belen, Francine Diaz, Seth Fedelin, Kaila Estrada, Richard Gutierrez, Dustin Yu	
D E C E M B E R	25	Love You So Bad	Star Cinema / GMA Pictures / Regal Entertainment	Mae Cruz-Alviar (director); Will Ashley, Dustin Yu, Bianca de Vera	
D E C E M B E R	25	I'mPerfect	Nathan Studios	Sigrid Andrea Bernardo (director); Krystel Go, Earl Amaba, Joey Marquez, Lorna Tolentino, Tonton Gutierrez, Sylvia Sanchez	
D E C E M B E R	25	Unmarry	Quantum Films / Cineko Productions	Jeffrey Jeturian (director); Angelica Panganiban, Zanjoe Marudo, Eugene Domingo	
D E C E M B E R	25	Bar Boys: After School	901 Studios	Kip Oebanda (director); Rocco Nacino, Carlo Aquino, Enzo Pineda, Kean Cipriano	
D E C E M B E R	25	Dear Santa	Filicoola / Black Cap Pictures / Mavx Productions	RC Delos Reyes (director); Paolo Contis, Sienna Stevens	
D E C E M B E R	26	Aliwan Inn	VMX / Pelikula Indiopendent	Roman Perez Jr. (director); Marco Mora, Margaret Diaz, Rinoa Halili	
D E C E M B E R	28	Baka Doon sa Buwan	iWant / Mavx Productions	Noah Tonga (director/screenplay); John Rogers (screenplay); Aaliyah Marciano, Mimi Felicia, Kate Alejandrino	
D E C E M B E R	30	Happy Ending	VMX / PCB Film Production	Topel Lee (director); Ashley Lopez, Ghion Espinosa, Ada Hermosa, Amor Lapus, Horace Mendoza, Jero Flores	

Color key

- – a Cinemalaya Independent Film Festival entry film.
- – a CineSilip Film Festival entry film.
- – a Sine Sindak entry film.
- – a Metro Manila Film Festival entry film
.
