= Christopher Morley (disambiguation) =

Christopher Morley may refer to:

- Christopher Morley (1890–1957), American writer
- Christopher Morley (actor) (1951–2023), American actor
- Chris Morley (born 1973), Welsh international rugby league footballer
- Christopher Love Morley (fl. 1700), English physician
