= Super Demetrios =

- Theatrical release poster
- Directed by: Georgios Papaioannou
- Story by: Alexandros Stogiannis; Spyros Papanaoum; Mitsos Papavasileiou; Georgios Papaioannou; Argyris Pougouras; Dimitrios Vainas; Charalampos Papapostolou
- Starring: Dimitrios Vainas; Paris Papadopoulos; Olga Sfetsa
- Music by: Mitsos Papavasileiou
- Distributed by: OTiNaNAi Productions
- Release date: November 5, 2011
- Running time: 110 minutes
- Country: Greece
- Language: Greek
- Budget: €2,000

Super Demetrios (Greek: Σούπερ Δημήτριος) is a 2011 Greek guerrilla ultra-low-budget superhero comedy film starring and written by the cinematic comedy group OtiNaNai Productions and directed by Georgios Papaioannou. Upon its release at the 52nd Thessaloniki International Film Festival the film got the highest number of audience votes in the history of the festival and became an instant cult classic, with all screenings being sold out in all venues thereafter.

== Plot ==
In a surreal, parallel universe, Thessaloniki has its very own superhero: Super Demetrios. Posing as Dimitris Christoforidis, journalist for the Golden Jerusalem magazine, he fights for truth, justice and the Greco-Christian ideal. In the dark of the night, the city's worst nightmare returns. Captain F.ROM is back, determined to meet his long-awaited goal: claiming his true name. The two protagonists are drawn into a conflict that toys with the viewer's patience until the very climax of the film, in an archetypal battle between good and evil.

== Cast ==
- Dimitrios Vainas as Super Demetrios
- Paris Papadopoulos as Captain F.ROM
- Olga Sfetsa as Maria Magdalo
- Tasos Masias as Tsoko
- Spyros Papanaoum as Not Tsoko, The Other Guy
- Alexandros Stogiannis as Mayor / Batman / God
- Charalampos Papapostolou as Haris / Babis (delivery boy)
- Argyris Pougouras as Agisilaos Rendas / Chief Thugson / Film Critic
- Anestis Derekas as Petros Malakasis / Penguin
- Dimitris Makris as Bishop Demagogian / Gyroine Addict
- Thanasis Kabouridis as Grandma
- Sergios Kobogiorgas as Papa-Michael
- Georgios Papaioannou as Billy / Panagiotis
- Kostantinos Floros as Little Super Demetrios
- Mitsos Papavasileiou as Guy in W.C. / Little Anne

== Development ==
Super Demetrios was created by a cinematic group called "OtiNaNai Productions" (literally: Whatever Productions). They are a group of friends from various Greek cities that met while in Thessaloniki as university students in the early 2000s. The group was formed initially by Georgios Papaioannou from Kavala and Mitsos Papavasileiou from Livadeia, both students of civil engineering, along with Dimitrios Vainas, Panos Kechagiopoulos, Charalambos Kydonakis, a student of architecture from Crete and Charalampos Papapostolou. They produced various short and feature DIY comedies and parodies in a philosophy similar to Monty Python's.

The idea of Super Demetrios came in 2007 while the team was working on a different script. One of the lesser characters of that script showed a lot of potential so they abandoned that script and started anew the story of Super Demetrios.

In June 2008 they began shooting in Thessaloniki. In December Georgios Papaioannou had to move to Athens for professional reasons while Mitsos Papavasileiou had already had moved to Livadeia so they stopped shooting.

In October 2009 they decided to resume shooting and they started a series of scheduled trips to Thessaloniki, mostly on weekends and holidays. Since all cast and crew collaborated for free and everything was done in a DIY philosophy, the film's budget of €2000 was merely the cost of those trips. The shooting concluded in October 2010, more than two years after it began. After that Georgios Papaioannou began editing it for almost a year.

In Spring 2011, since the word of the first Greek superhero movie had already been spread among fans, the movie was invited to the Den Yparxei Film Festival in Athens. During that time only one full scene was complete with visual effects and compositing (the space shuttle scene) and therefore only that scene could be screened in the festival. Nevertheless, the movie was awarded a special prize for the Best Picture Yet To See.

In November 2011 a rough cut of Super Demetrios was first publicly screened at the 52nd Thessaloniki International Film Festival.

After the festival Georgios Papaioannou resumed editing the movie for a while. They also replaced some of the songs used in the festival copy with original scores so as in the final cut all music was either original or royalty-free.

== Distribution ==
Following the awards the film was distributed by the Thessaloniki International Film Festival to several Greek cities.

After that, OtiNaNai Productions got its own distribution in two cinemas in Athens and Thessaloniki at the same time.

The film was also invited to many film clubs around Greece.

=== License ===
One year after its initial screening the film along with its soundtrack was freely released on the Internet under an Attribution, Non-commercial, No Derivative Works 3.0 Unported Creative Commons license (CC BY-NC-ND 3.0).

== Trivia ==
- The protagonist's title "Super Demetrios" is a direct reference to Thessaloniki's patron saint Saint Demetrius.
- The movie was distributed freely on the Internet on October 26, the name day of Super Demetrios/Dimitris Christophorides, i.e. the feast day of Saint Demetrius.
- The villain's title is "Captain F.ROM" (pronounced "fee-rom") and his constant goal throughout the film is to be recognised by his true name. This is a satire on the Macedonia naming dispute, due to the acronym "FYROM", which was often used to refer to the country.

=== Cinematic references ===
- The movie was inspired mainly by Richard Donner's Superman (1978) with some stylistic elements such as the costumes inspired by the Batman (1960's) TV series with Adam West.
- The protagonist's real name is "Dimitris Christophorides" while his priest step father is called "Papa-Michael" (Father Michael) so his full name would be "Dimitris Papa-Michael Christophorides" (we see that briefly in a close up of an official document) which is a homage to Dimitris Papamichael, one of the most famous Greek actors of the "golden era" of Greek cinema.
- One of the first scenes, that shows a Space Shuttle unfolding itself over the orb of the Earth (resembling a giant frappé coffee hand mixer) while Strauss's Also sprach Zarathustra plays in the background, is a homage to Stanley Kubrick's 2001: A Space Odyssey (1968).
- Tsoko's dying scene is almost an exact copy of Colonel Kurtz's dying scene of Francis Ford Coppola's film Apocalypse Now (1979).
- The long duel scene at the end of the film has the form of a mexican standoff. It takes place in a dusty area, lasts for several minutes, with lots of extreme close ups, and with the film's main theme played in an Ennio Morricone way, with a big crescendo at the end. The whole style of the scene is a homage to Sergio Leone's Spaghetti Westerns, especially The Good, the Bad and the Ugly (1966).
- The breaking the fourth wall scene near the end of the film, where the director and crew give acting directions to the actor portraying Super Demetrios is a homage to the similar ending scene of the film Monty Python and the Holy Grail (1976). The directions given are actually the most basic Stanislavski's system's list of techniques which is another meta-reference self-criticizing the obvious poor acting of the amateur actors of the film, protagonist included.

== Reception ==
Due to the long time taken for development, even before its release, Super Demetrios had already had a strong fan base, mostly among the Thessaloniki campus students.

In mid 2011, a major Athenian newspaper did a two-page tribute to Super Demetrios, the so-called "first Greek superhero film", making it known to the general public of Athens.

Upon its release at the 52nd Thessaloniki International Film Festival all screenings were crowded with a lot of people watching it standing up on the stairs. The film got the highest number of audience votes in the history of the festival. After that it was considered an instant cult classic, compared by many critics to an earlier Greek sci-fi cult film, The Attack of the Giant Moussaka (1999).

=== Critical reception ===
Super Demetrios received broadly positive reviews in the mainstream press.

Giannis Zoumboulakis from To Vima newspaper described it as "the most pleasant Greek production in the last Thessaloniki Film Festival".

Ilias Fragoulis from Free Cinema called it "the most epic sci-fi b-movie of Greek cinema, after The Attack of the Giant Moussaka".

Kostas Tsokos of FilmBoy gave it a 7/10 saying among others that "First of all, everythings shows love and affection for the genre, and for cinema in general" and that "acting is a bit flat and dry but in most cases fits the movie's style. But after all it's a superhero parody and all this makes it more cult and less pretentious."

Georgia Myridaki from Fringe gave it 5/5 writing that "it has tons of caustic humor, mocks and plays very cleverly with stereotypes that are inextricably linked with this city, like nationalism, strong Christian faith, surrealism" while "leaving aside clichés."

Stratos Kersanidis from AlterThess calls it "cult cinema in all its glory" and a "thoroughly poorly done film" that satirizes shamelessly and in a "blasphemous" and funny way the conservatism and other aspects of Thessaloniki.

Giorgos Kalapotharakos of Cine Tweets gave it 2/5. He wrote that directing was good, especially if you consider the budget, but he found acting unacceptable.

=== Accolades ===
Year	Award	Category	Result
2011	Den Yparxei Film Festival	Best Picture Yet To See	Won
2011	Thessaloniki International Film Festival Audience Award	Best Greek Picture	Won
2011	Michael Cacoyannis Award	Best Picture	Won
2012	Athens Science Fiction and Fantasy International Film Festival		Official selection
2012	Los Angeles Greek Film Festival		Official selection
2012	London Greek Film Festival		Official selection

== Legacy ==
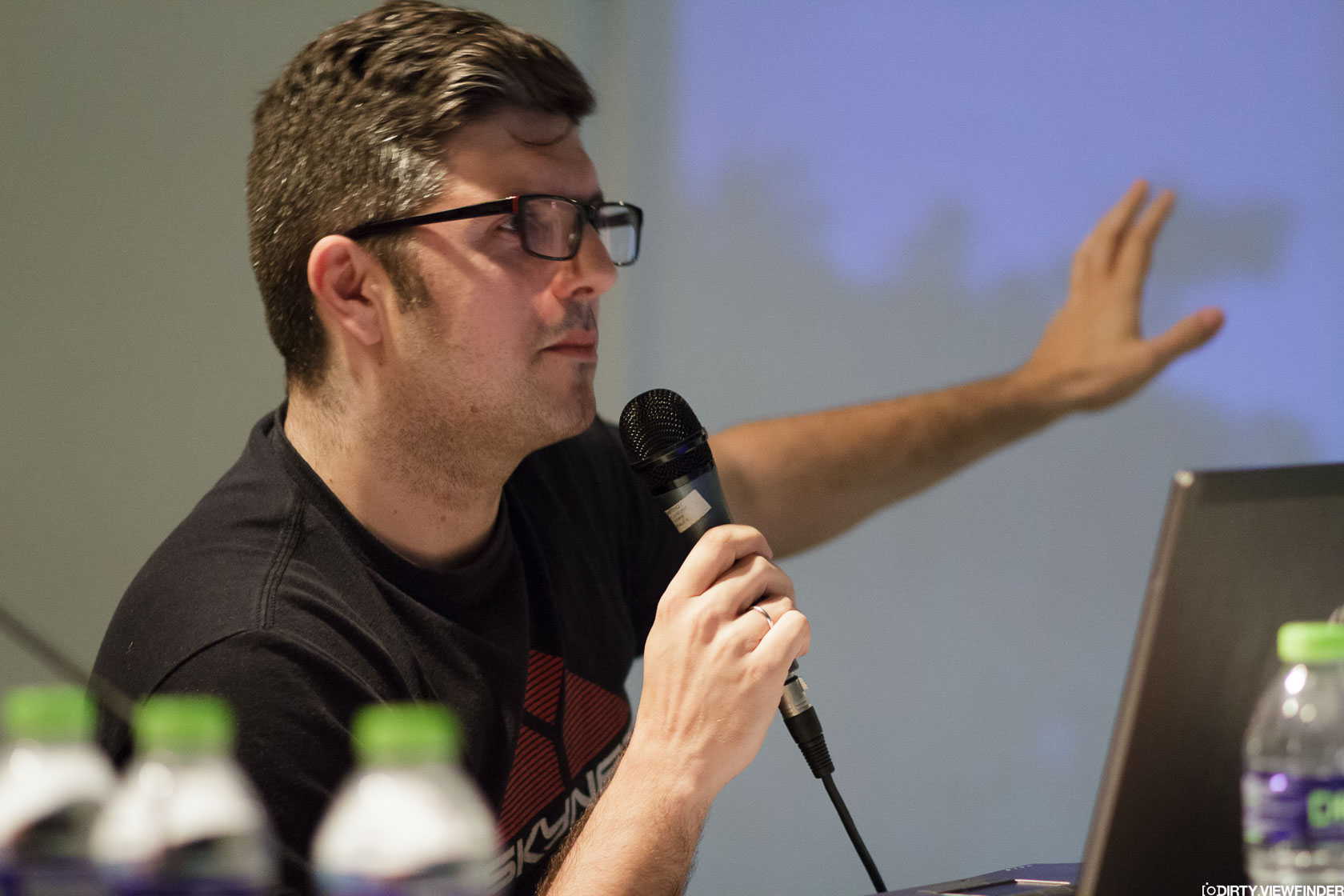
Georgios Papaioannou giving the Super Demetrios master class

As a result of the film's success, Georgios Papaioannou, a successful PhD in civil engineering, decided to pursue a career in visual effects. After his visit to Los Angeles invited by the Los Angeles Greek Film Festival he studied in Gnomon School of Visual Effects in Hollywood, and now he is working as a VFX expert in the industry. His most notable work is for the film The Expendables 3 (2014).

In May 2015, Super Demetrios became an academic subject. Invited by the Public Vocational Institute of Agios Dimitrios, Georgios Papaioannou gave a big master class on the VFX of Super Demetrios to students of 8 departments of computer graphics from several Public Vocational Institutes of Athens.

== See also ==
- The Attack of the Giant Moussaka
