= CineSilip Film Festival =

Philippine film festival

- Location: Philippines
- Founded: 2025; 1 year ago
- Hosted by: Viva Entertainment
- Artistic director: Ronald Arguelles

CineSilip Film Festival is an erotic film festival in the Philippines organized by VMX. The first edition was held in October 2025.

== Background ==
VMX, a platform known for streaming adult-oriented media, launched the CineSilip Film Festival in October 2025 with Ronald Arguelles as its inaugural festival director.

The festival was established to provide a platform for emerging Filipino filmmakers to tell stories beyond mainstream conventions, particularly those tackling adult or controversial subject matter. It also seeks to challenge the stigma surrounding erotic or mature-themed Filipino cinema by providing institutional recognition and a legitimate space for exhibition.

== First edition ==
The inaugural edition was held from October 22 to 28, 2025 with the seven entrant films screened in select Ayala Malls cinemas. The films were selected from 100 film submissions. The awarding ceremony was held on October 28, 2025.

Dreamboi won several major awards, including Best Film, Best Director, and the Audience Choice Award. The film gained attention after initially receiving an “X” rating twice from the Movie and Television Review and Classification Board (MTRCB) before finally being approved for public screening with an R-18 classification.

=== Entries ===
Title	Starring	Production company	Director	Genre	Premiere date	Ref.
Dreamboi	EJ Jallorina, Jenn Rosa, Migs Almendras, Tony Labrusca	Spicy Mama Creative Studios	Rodina Singh	Psychological drama	October 22	
Haplos sa Hangin	Denise Esteban, Martin del Rosario, Angelica Cervantes	Southern Lantern Studios	Mikko Baldoza	Erotic horror	October 22	
Pagdaong	Angela Morena, Astrid Lee, Ashley Lopez	Roughroad Productions	Pangs Leonardo	Girl's love	October 22	
Maria Azama: Best P*rn Star	Albie Casiño, Dani Yoshida	Overstimulated Studios	Alpha Habon	Sexual comedy	October 23	
Salikmata	Aliya Raymundo, Aerol Carmelo, VJ Vera, Rinoa Halili, Jeffrey Hidalgo	Cine Canawili Productions	BC Amparado	Supernatural thriller	October 23	
Babae sa Butas	Van Allen Ong, Vern Kaye, Arah Alonzo, Skye Gonzaga, Karen Lopez	Sixth Sense Entertainment Productions	Rhance Añonuevo-Cariño	Mystery drama	October 24	
Ang Lihim ni Maria Makinang	Aiko Garcia, Gold Aceron, Micaella Raz, Christy Imperial, Mercedes Cabral, Leandro Baldemor	Spikehead Media	Gian Arre	Coming-of-age drama	October 24	
