= Panos H. Koutras =

Greek film director, film producer and screenwriter

- Born: Panagiotis Koutras; Athens, Greece
- Occupations: Film director, producer and screenwriter

Panos H. Koutras (Greek: Πάνος Χ. Κούτρας) is a Greek film director, film producer and screenwriter, who made his debut with the feature film The Attack of the Giant Moussaka (1999), an independent science-fiction parody which gained international recognition in France and Japan and is still considered as a cult classic. He has directed, produced and written three more films: Real Life (2004), a French-Greek co-production, selected at the Toronto International Film Festival (Contemporary World Cinema) Strella (2009), selected at the Panorama at Berlin International Film Festival and Xenia (2014), selected at the Un Certain Regard at Cannes Film Festival. His latest film, Dodo (2022), a Greek-French-Belgian co-production will make its world premiere at the 75th Cannes Film Festival.

== Early life ==
He was born and raised in Athens. He studied filmmaking at the London Film School and at the Sorbonne in Paris. He directed several short films. His short film The Fall and Rise of Lydia Von Burer won the first prize at the Festival du Cinema, Mediterranean in 1991. In 1995, he founded the production company 100% Synthetic Films in Athens, and started working on his first feature film, The Attack of the Giant Moussaka (1999).

== Career ==
His first feature film, The Attack of the Giant Moussaka (1999) was a totally independent production and one of the first films that were shot digitally in Greece. It was completed after five years and two sets of shooting. The film gained recognition in France, where it is still considered as a cult classic. The film was also released in movie theaters in Japan.

His second feature film, Real Life (2004), a Greek - French co-production, became a critics' favorite in Greece, where it won the National Critics Award in 2004, and traveled to the International Toronto Film Festival at the Contemporary World Section.

His third feature film, Strella (2009), premiered at the Panorama Section of Berlin International Film Festival in 2009. Strella (2009), a totally independent production, was filmed over a period of almost ten months with nearly all the roles played by non-professionals. Mina Orfanou, the trans woman actress who played the title role was the first ever trans woman to ever receive the award for Best Female Role at the awards of the Hellenic Film Academy.

Xenia, his fourth feature film, a Greek-French-Belgian co-production had its world premiere at Cannes Film Festival (Un Certain Regard), was the official submission of Greece for the Academy Award for International Film.

He was a member on the jury for the Un Certain Regard section of the 2015 Cannes Film Festival. and on the jury for the Cinéfondation and Short Films section of the 2019 Cannes Film Festival.

Dodo, his fifth feature film, will make its world premiere at the 75th Cannes Film Festival, in the Cannes Premiere section of the official selection.

== Personal life ==
Panos H. Koutras is openly gay, an LGBTQ+ activist, a founding member of Athens Pride and a constant advocate of human rights.

In an interview in the French newspaper Libération he highlighted the racism and hypocrisy prevailing in Greek society.

== Filmography ==
=== Film ===
| Year | Title | Director | Writer | Producer | Production company |
|---|---|---|---|---|---|
| 1999 | The Attack of the Giant Moussaka | Yes | Yes | Yes | 100% Synthetic Films |
| 2004 | Real Life | Yes | Yes | No | Argonauts Productions |
| 2009 | Strella | Yes | Yes | Yes | 100% Synthetic Films |
| 2014 | Xenia | Yes | Yes | Yes | 100% Synthetic Films |
| 2022 | Dodo | Yes | Yes | Yes | 100% Synthetic Films |
