= The Attack of the Giant Moussaka =

- French theatrical release poster
- Directed by: Panos H. Koutras
- Written by: Panos Evagellidis; Yorgos Korontsis
- Produced by: Panos H. Koutras
- Starring: Yannis Aggelakis; Myriam Vourou; Christos Mantakas; Gregory Patrikareas; Eugene Dimitriou; Themis Bazaka; Roubini Vasilakopoulou; Jenny Balatsinou; Dorothea Mercouri
- Cinematography: Zafiris Epaminondas
- Edited by: Elissavet Chronopoulou
- Music by: Konstantinos Vita
- Release date: 24 December 1999
- Running time: 90 minutes
- Country: Greece
- Languages: Greek, English, French, Japanese, Russian.

The Attack of the Giant Moussaka (French: L'Attaque de la moussaka géante; Greek: Η Επίθεση του Γιγαντιαίου Μουσακά; 1999), is a Greek science fiction parody film, produced, written and directed by Panos H. Koutras. It has been released theatrically in France, with French subtitles, and Japan, with Japanese subtitles. It has been screened at several festivals, including specialised LGBT film festivals, and has achieved cult status.

== Premise ==
The city of Athens is at war with a terrifying gigantic moussaka accidentally produced when an ordinary serving is hit by a ray from an alien space ship.

== Cast ==
- Yannis Aggelakis as Tara
- Myriam Vourou as Joy Boudala
- Christos Mantakas as Alexis Alexiou
- Gregory Patrikareas as Antonis Boudalas
- Eugene Dimitriou as Aris Boudalas
- Themis Bazaka as Evi Bay
- Roubini Vasilakopoulou as Aleka Spay
- Jenny Balatsinou as doctor
- Dorothea Mercouri as Gora
- Hilda Iliopoulou as Daizy Karra
- Nikos Saropoulos as Dinos Dinou
- Michalis Pantos as Dimis
- Maria Kavadia as Chanel

Deitra Kanellos as Moussaka

== See also ==
- Super Demetrios
