= Real Life (2004 film) =

- Directed by: Panos H. Koutras
- Written by: Panos Evagellidis, Panos H. Koutras
- Starring: Nikos Kouris; Themis Bazaka; Marina Kalogirou; Anna Mouglalis; Maria Panouria; Odysseas Papaspiliopoulos; Yiannis Diamantis
- Cinematography: Elias Kostandakopoulos
- Music by: Mikael Delta
- Distributed by: Playtime (Greece); Wild Bunch (worldwide)
- Release date: 5 November 2004 (Greece)
- Running time: 111 minutes
- Countries: Greece; France
- Languages: French; Greek

Real Life (Greek: Αληθινή ζωή, Alithini Zoi) is a 2004 Greek drama film written and directed by Panos H. Koutras.

== Plot ==
Aris, 27 years old, returns home after a long absence. His mother, a rich, eccentric and lonely woman lives with her secretary, Sylvia and her loyal gardener Christos, who is mute, in a house famous both for its view on Acropolis and for its swimming pool, supposed to be the deepest in Europe. As Aris falls in love with a poor girl, Alexandra, and confronts his past, a wildfire threatens Athens.

== Cast ==
- Nikos Kouris – Aris
- Themis Bazaka – Kalliga
- Marina Kalogirou – Alexandra
- Maria Panouria – Sylvia
- Anna Mouglalis – Joy
- Yiannis Diamantis – Hristos
