= Mina Orfanou =

Greek actress

- Μίνα Ορφανού
- Born: 3 May 1982 (age 44); Rhodes, Greece
- Occupation: Actress

Mina Orfanou (Greek: Μίνα Ορφανού; born 3 May 1982 in Rhodes) is a Greek actress. She grew up in Kalymnos. She is notable for her lead role in Strella, for which she received the Best Actress award at the 2010 Hellenic Film Academy Awards. She is a transgender woman.
