= Strella =

- Directed by: Panos H. Koutras
- Written by: Panos H. Koutras, Panayiotis Evangelidis
- Produced by: Panos H. Koutras
- Starring: Mina Orfanou; Yiannis Kokiasmenos; Minos Theoharis; Betty Vakalidou; Akis Ioannou
- Cinematography: Olympia Mitilinaiou
- Edited by: Yiannis Chalkiadakis
- Music by: Mikael Delta
- Distributed by: Memento Films
- Release date: 25 November 2009 (France)
- Running time: 113 minutes
- Country: Greece
- Language: Greek

Strella (Greek: Στρέλλα; international title: A Woman's Way) is a 2009 Greek drama film written and directed by Panos H. Koutras. The film centres around the relationship between an ex-convict recently released from jail, and a young transgender sex worker that he meets and forms a romance with.

== Plot ==
After serving fourteen years in prison for murder in his Greek village, Yiorgos Mihalopoulos is released and spends his first night in a cheap Athens hotel, where he meets Strella, a young and beautiful transgender prostitute. While searching for his estranged son Leonidas, he reconnects with her; that night, after whiskey and despite her initial resistance, the two have sex.

Strella lives in her humble apartment and works at a club called The Dolls where she performs in drag. After a failed search for Leonidas, Strella invites Yiorgos to see her perform, and later lets him stay in her place where they have sex again. Yiorgos moves out of the hotel after Strella offers to let him stay temporarily.

Strella visits Mary, her elderly cancer-stricken trans guardian who raised her, bringing morphine patches and fixing her television. She tells Mary about her new lover, but Mary urges Strella to stop her unspecified pursuit. Mary then reminisces about her late lover Anestis and shares her funeral plans.

Yiorgos finds a young man named Leonidas working as a police officer but chooses not to approach him. Satisfied, he settles into a relationship with Strella. Later, he sells his family home in the village to retired cop Kouloukousis, who shares rumors that Leonidas is actually a trans woman working as a prostitute in Athens. Realizing Strella could be his son, Yiorgos quickly leaves.

Yiorgos returns home and confronts Strella about her past. She reveals her story: as a nine-year-old boy, she was coerced into sexual acts by her seventeen-year-old uncle. Her father burst in, killed the uncle, and accidentally injured her. Hospitalized afterward, she was raised by her grandmother and later left the village. Yiorgos leaves without a word.

The next day, Yiorgos returns and reveals he is her father, furious about their incest. While they argue, Strella’s gay friend Alex arrives. Yiorgos notices a familiar bag and realizes Strella had known his identity from the start; she had followed him to the hotel, fallen in love, and chosen to continue the relationship. Though he tries to leave, he stays when she begs him not to abandon her again.

Strella visits the dying Mary, who scolds her for sleeping with her own father. Though Mary confesses her own lover Anestis was her uncle, she warns Strella there is no future in such a relationship. Back home, Yiorgos and Strella argue. When he announces he will sell the family house, Strella hands him the key she had kept. The fight escalates as Yiorgos condemns her sex work and reminds her the uncle was abusing her; Strella insists she liked it. The argument ends with Yiorgos slapping her repeatedly before storming out.

Yiorgos returns to the family home and is flooded with memories of his past life with his wife and Strella after seeing old photos and toys. Meanwhile, Strella finds that Mary has committed suicide by overdosing on morphine packets. As Alex and his baby sister move in with her, Strella notices Yiorgos following her. She later arrives at a luxury hotel for a client, only to discover Yiorgos, who admits he misses her and wants to reconcile. Strella confesses she feels the same but leaves in tears.

On New Year's Eve, Yiorgos has fully reconciled with Strella, and is living again with her, Alex, and Alex's sister. Inviting Yiorgos' old cellmate and his friend, they celebrate the new year together.

== Cast ==
- Mina Orfanou as Strella
- Yiannis Kokiasmenos as Yiorgos Mihalopoulos
- Minos Theoharis as Alex
- Betty Vakalidou as Mary
- Akis Ioannou as Wilma
- Argiris Kavidas as Nikos
- Kostas Siradakis as Antonis
- Yiorgos Mazis as Kolokousis

== Production ==
The film was shot on location in Athens and Peloponnese. The role of Strella was performed by the first-time actress Mina Orfanou, who is a trans woman.

== Awards ==
The film was premiered in the 59th Berlin International Film Festival - Section Panorama - in February 2009 and has participated since in more than 20 international film festivals all over the world. It was one of the 48 films nominated for the European Film Awards in 2009.

Strella won four awards of the eleven it was nominated for, including best actress and art direction, at the first Hellenic Film Academy awards ceremony in 2010.
