= Marupok AF =

Marupok AF (Where Is The Lie?)
- Official release poster
- Directed by: Quark Henares
- Written by: Quark Henares
- Starring: EJ Jallorina; Royce Cabrera; Maris Racal
- Production companies: Anima Studio; First Cut Lab
- Release dates: January 22, 2023 (Slamdance); August 4, 2023 (Cinemalaya); July 10, 2024
- Country: Philippines

Marupok AF (Where Is The Lie?) is a 2023 Philippine comedy-thriller film written and directed by Quark Henares under Anima Studio and First Cut Lab, starring EJ Jallorina, Royce Cabrera, and Maris Racal.

== Premise ==
Marupok AF features Janzen Torres (EJ Jallorina) a transgender woman and hopeless romantic. Determined to find a boyfriend she turns to online dating where she meets Theo Balmaceda (Royce Cabrera). They agree to meet in real life but Torres would get ghosted by her online boyfriend.

== Cast ==
- EJ Jallorina as Janzen Torres, an interior design student and transgender woman
- Royce Cabrera as Theo Balmaceda / Dennis, a young man who Torres meets in a dating app
- Maris Racal as Beanie Landridos, an art director who catfishes LGBT people online

== Production ==
Maruopok AF was produced under Anima Studios under the direction of Quark Henares. It was made with the support of the 2022 Full Circle Lab Philippines Editing Lab of the Film Development Council of the Philippines.

Originally the film was planned to have three separate parts from the point of view (POV) of its three main characters each with a specific tone; Torres story would be a "cheesy" Philippine mainstream romantic-comedy; Balmaceda's is a social realist drama; and Landridos would be like a heist film. The final film featured a linear plot with the characters' POV "interspersed".

=== Theme ===
Marupok AF has transgender issues and catfishing as its central theme. Transphobia was also portrayed in the film; with juxtaposed scenes referencing President Rodrigo Duterte's pardon of American Marine personnel Scott Pemberton who was convicted of killing transgender woman Jennifer Laude and scenes showing Janzen's experience in using the women's restroom present in the film.

The film was based on the real life account of Cebu-based transgender woman Jzan Vern Tero. Tero shared her experienced of being catfished through Twitter by of multimedia artist Sam Morales, who went under the alias Bill Iver Reyes.

== Release ==
Marupok AF (Where Is The Lie?) premiered in the United States at the Slamdance Film Festival as a film under the festival's Breakouts Program on January 22, 2023. It would be also screened in Udine Film Festival in Italy, the Los Angeles Asian Pacific Film Festival, and the New York Film Festival.

It would premiere in the Philippines as part of the 19th Cinemalaya Independent Film Festival. It is the opening film of the film festival which opened on August 4, 2023.
