= Lisik: Origin Point =

2025 horror film by John Renz Cahilig

- Theatrical release poster
- Directed by: John Renz Cahilig
- Screenplay by: John Renz Cahilig; Patrick Garcia
- Story by: Chrisheil Clemente Acal; Dominic Apil Orlajo
- Produced by: Dominic Orjalo
- Starring: Nika De Guzman; Grace Rosas Tayo; Jeremiah Allera; Rosemarie Smith
- Edited by: John Renz Cahilig
- Music by: Patrick Anthony Garcia
- Production companies: Domniel International Films Production; Dominic Institute of Science and Technology
- Distributed by: PinoyFlix
- Release date: February 19, 2025
- Running time: 91 minutes
- Country: Philippines
- Language: Filipino
- Budget: ₱10 million

Lisik: Origin Point is a 2025 Philippine independent apocalyptic horror thriller film directed and screenplay by John Renz Cahilig. It stars Nika De Guzman, Grace Rosas Tayo, Jeremiah Allera, Rosemarie Smith and produced by Dominic Orjalo. The film is about senior high school students who encounter a mysterious infection in their school and it transforms students into flesh-eating monsters.

== Plot ==
In a quiet coastal town in the Philippines, senior high school student Kara (Grace Rosas Tayo) is grappling with the recent suicide of her younger brother, who was relentlessly bullied by classmates. Her best friend, Elisha (Nika De Guzman), is consumed by anger and seeks vengeance against the bullies, led by the arrogant and manipulative Max (Jeremiah Allera).

As the school year progresses, a mysterious infection begins to spread within the school, turning students into flesh-eating monsters known as “Lisik”. The infection seems to amplify the evil within individuals.

The outbreak is traced back to a secret experiment conducted by the school's science teacher, Dr. Espino (Rosemarie Smith), who aimed to enhance human abilities but inadvertently unleashed a deadly virus. As chaos ensues, Elisha uncovers the truth behind the experiments and hunts down the bullies, exacting her revenge in a series of gruesome encounters. However, she too succumbs to the infection, her eyes glowing blue as she transforms into a Lisik.

In a final act of humanity, Elisha urges Kara to escape with crucial documents that could expose the sinister experiments. Kara sacrifices herself to save a young boy, ensuring the evidence reaches the authorities. Elisha, now the last survivor, is found by her policeman brother, her eyes still glowing, hinting at a lingering consciousness despite her transformation.

== Cast ==
- Nika De Guzman as Elisha
- Grace Rosas Tayo as Kara
- Jeremiah Allera as Max
- Rosemarie Smith
- Ramon Christopher
- Revers Quilario
- Joshua Cantuba
- Rain Mirasol
- Jossah Mae Sison
- Rob Sy

== Production ==
On February 7, 2025, director John Renz Cahilig talks about the difference between Lisik: Origin Point and the South Korean series All of Us Are Dead. The director said that his upcoming film take place in a school where the experiment of the professor cause the outbreak in the school. He added that All of Us Are Dead introduced "hambies", half human and half zombie hybrid.

He also added that they are not copycat because the characters in their film are unique he also think that the characters in All of Us Are Dead are very chaotic, they have similar setting but not the same.

== Release ==
The film was theatrically released in the Philippines February 19, 2025, under PinoyFlix banner.
