= Christopher Love Morley =

English physician

- Occupation: Physician

Christopher Love Morley (fl. 1700) was an English physician.

== Biography ==
Morley was born in or about 1646, and from his name may probably have been related to Christopher Love, the presbyterian. He was entered as a medical student at Leyden 18 Feb. 1676 (English Students at Leyden, Index Society, 1883), being then thirty years of age (Munk), and graduated M.D. in 1679. According to a short account of Morley in the preface to his 'Collectanea Chymica,' he had travelled widely, and apparently practised medicine before coming to Holland. At Leyden he attended the medical practice of Schacht and Drelincourt, with the anatomical lectures of the latter, and also studied chemistry with Maëts and others. Morley was accustomed to take copious notes of lectures, cases, &c., which ultimately extended, it is said, to more than forty quarto volumes. Of these a few have survived, and are now in the British Museum (Sloane MSS., Nos. 1259, 1272, 1273, 1289). They are dated 1677 to 1679, and not only show Morley's diligence as a student, but give an interesting picture of the state of medical education in Leyden at the time. On his return to England he published a little volume on an epidemic fever then prevalent in England, Holland, and else where, which he dedicated to the Royal College of Physicians ('De Morbo Epidemico,' 1678–9, &c., London, 1680, 12mo). It contains an account of his personal experience of the disease, and a letter from Professor Schacht of Leyden on the same subject, besides remarks on the state of medical practice in England and Holland. This probably led to his election as an honorary fellow of the College of Physicians 30 Sept. 1680 (since, not being an English graduate, he was not eligible to become an ordinary fellow). He did not immediately settle down, for in 1683 we find him going on a voyage to the Indies, but in 1684 he was practising in London.

In the new charter granted to the college in 1686 by James II Morley was named as an actual fellow, and was admitted in the following year. This fact shows that he was a partisan of James II, and probably a Roman catholic, so that he found a difficulty in taking the oaths required by the government after the revolution, and finally, in 1700, his name was on that ground withdrawn, at his own request, from the college list. His subsequent career cannot be traced.

Morley was evidently a man of remarkably wide knowledge in medicine and other sciences, but he did nothing in later life to justify his early promise. Beside the work mentioned above he published 'Collectanea Chemica Leydensia' (Leyden, 1684, 4to), which is evidently extracted from the notebooks above referred to. It consists of a large number of chemical and pharmaceutical receipts taken from the lectures of three professors of chemistry at Leyden Mae'ts, Marggraff, and Le Mort. It was translated into German (Jena, 1696), and appeared in a second Latin edition (Antwerp, 1702, 12mo).
