= Lina Bradford =

American disc jockey, dancer, and actress

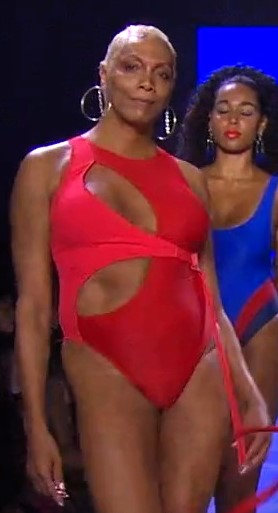
- Bradford models for Chromat in 2019
- Born: Manhattan, New York, U.S.
- Other names: Girlina; DJ Lina
- Occupations: DJ, dancer, actress
- Years active: 1994–present

Lina Bradford, professionally known as DJ Lina (previously known as Girlina), is an American disc jockey, dancer, and actress. Bradford was a member of the 1990s New York Club Kids scene and first performed as a DJ in 1997. She appeared in films, including Wigstock: The Movie and Woo, for which she gained wider prominence. She hosts an interview web series titled In the Dollhouse with Lina.

== Early life ==
Bradford was born and raised in Carnegie Hill, Manhattan of New York City, across the street from Carnegie Hall, where her grandmother performed as an opera singer. She began professional dance lessons at age 11 and performed in several dance companies. Her family was accepting of her trans identity from her youth.

Bradford is referred to as trans, but said in a 2019 interview with Out that she does not use labels. She stated "I only grew up with the labels that were on my back. I don’t ever like to feel limited with somebody slapping a label on me as a person."

== Career ==
=== Underground club kid ===
Bradford was an active member of the gay underground club scene in New York City from the early 1990s (known as a "club kid"), where she was a dancer and performer known as Girlina. She gained wider prominence when she appeared in the film Wigstock in 1994 with Candis Cayne, who she has known since youth.

She first performed as a DJ in April 1997. She was encouraged by DJs TPRO, Frankie Knuckles, Carlos Pertrus, Larry Levan, Junior Vasquez and Steve Travolta to begin DJing, and spun her first set at the now-closed Club Life. Most of her early DJ sessions took place in the East Village of Manhattan.

She also acted in the films Always Something Better and Woo.

=== Later work ===
Bradford began a 10-year residency at Fire Island Pines in 2005, where she spun regular sets for attendees as DJ Lina. She first held the regular session, titled Lina's Lounge, for two years and then hosted a regular set, titled Twirlina, for the succeeding eight years.

Bradford DJs at various clubs in New York and has spun in European locales including Paris, Sardinia, and Saint-Tropez. Of her performance style, she noted that she never chooses a playlist in advance and attempts to both cater to the audience and "take [them] for a ride."

She was the subject of Linish (2019), a short documentary film directed by Manu Rodriguez, which premiered at Phluid Project NYC.

Bradford participates in LGBTQ advocacy work. She is a global ambassador for the Hetrick-Martin Institute, an organization supporting LGBTQ youth.

== Accolades ==
- The Glammys, Lifetime Achievement Award
- 2019 – Logo TV, Logo30
