= Dreamboi =

- Directed by: Rodina Singh
- Written by: Rodina Singh
- Starring: EJ Jallorina; Jenn Rosa; Migs Almendras; Tony Labrusca
- Edited by: Arnex Nicolas
- Music by: Silas
- Release date: October 22, 2025 (Cinesilip)
- Running time: 120 minutes
- Language: Filipino
- Budget: ₱2 million

Dreamboi is a 2025 erotic psychological drama film starring, EJ Jallorina, Jenn Rosa, and Tony Labrusca directed by Rodina Singh.

The film revolves around a trans woman and her obsession with an underground audio porn actor.

It premiered at the CineSilip Film Festival, an event for adult-rated films, which began on October 22, 2025. Still the film received a prior X-rating from the MTRCB, due to concerns over sexual content, before being reevaluated as an R-18 film after two appeals.

== Premise ==
Diwa (EJ Jallorina), a trans woman resorts to audio porn in a bid to feel something again until she develops an obsession after secretly eavesdropping a stranger having sex in a basement toilet. She later learns that the man is her favorite anonymous audio porn actor

== Cast ==
Main cast

- EJ Jallorina as Diwa, a trans woman. Director Singh wrote Dreamboi with Jallorina, her friend, in mind.
- Jenn Rosa as Lilith, a manifestation of Diwa's sexual desires
- Migs Almendras as Maki, Diwa's coworker and a love interest. Almendras describe the character's orientation as very "fluid" and "almost pansexual". Director Singh had Maki's characterization as similar t that of a golden retriever or "charming and loveable"
- Tony Labrusca as Dreamboi, an audio porn actor who is self-assured in being sexy. Labrusca had his hair dyed pink and had his nails painted for the role. This is his first role in an erotic film. Labrusca has expressed having to "literally reveal" himself to portray the titular character is the most challenging part of his role. Singh describes Dreamboi as "personification of desire" and view Labrusca as fit for the role remembering how the actor "captured" her "seven years ago".

Supporting cast

- Iyah Mina as a woman who runs a bar at Barangay Pag-asa
- Meanne Espinosa as Manang Guy
- Tads Obach

Special participation

- Pura Luka Vega
- Inah Evans
- Sophie Prime
- Barbie Q
- Sassa Gurl

== Production ==
Dreamboi was directed by Rodina Singh, who is a trans woman herself. The film was centered around the "undressing" and sexual desires of trans women. While the film included elements of transphobia, Singh was careful to avoid "exploiting trauma" and believed in the principle of being able to make a film that she could watch with cisgender people. The film had a budget of ₱2 million. The film was produced for the queer demographic rather than the cisgender male demographic VMX primarily caters to.

== Release ==
Dreamboi is among the entrant for the inaugural CineSilip Film Festival which was held in select Ayala Malls cinemas from October 22 to 28, 2025. The event is by VMX, a streaming platform known for its erotic films which has featured heterosexual intercourse. It is the first three of seven CineSilip Films which premiered on the first day alongside Haplos sa Hangin and Pagdaong.

=== Film rating ===
Dreamboi was initially rated X by the Movie and Television Review and Classification Board (MTRCB) on October 16 effectively banning it for public exhibition. It failed an appeal in October 20 with the X-rating affirmed by the MTRCB. The MTRCB justified its initial X-rating due to its "prolonged sexually explicit scenes" while acknowledging Dreamboi "offers important representation and commentary". Rodina insist the film is "not pornography" and is an adult film which explores a trans woman's desire.

It was proposed that the film be reshoot with a cisgender male actor in a bid to downgrade the X-rating. UP Cinema condemned MTRCB's rating as censorship and queer erasure. Sassa Gurl says that Dreamboi was being singled out since the CineSilip entries also had sexual themes and says the rating reeks of transphobia.Dreamboi was given a R-18 rating on its third review on October 21.

== Accolades ==
Year	Award-Giving Body	Category	Recipient(s) and nominee(s)	Result	Ref
2025	1st CineSilip Film Festival Awards	Best Film	Dreamboi	Won	
2025	1st CineSilip Film Festival Awards	Best Director	Rondina Singh	Won	
2025	1st CineSilip Film Festival Awards	Best Supporting Actor	Migs Almendras	Won	
2025	1st CineSilip Film Festival Awards	Best Cinematography	Malay Javier	Won	
2025	1st CineSilip Film Festival Awards	Best Editing	Arnex Nicolas	Won	
2025	1st CineSilip Film Festival Awards	Best Production Design	Chippie Day Abando	Won	
2025	1st CineSilip Film Festival Awards	Best Sound	Immanuel Verona and John Buquid	Won	
2025	1st CineSilip Film Festival Awards	Audience Prize Award	Dreamboi	Won	
