= Christopher Morley (actor) =

American actor and female impersonator (1951–2023)

Christopher Jarman Morley (July 22, 1951 – November 2, 2023) was an American actor and female impersonator. He specialized in cross-dressing roles in television and film, most notably in Freebie and the Bean (1974) and General Hospital (1980).

== Early life ==
Morley was born on July 22, 1951, the elder of two sons born to William Jarman Morley II and Audrey Mary Farmer. His paternal family originated in England, but came to America in 1843, settling first in Dillsboro, Indiana and later in Carrollton, Kentucky. His great-grandfather, William Jarman Morley, moved to Austin, Texas in the 1870s and was a co-founder of Morley Brothers Drug Company, with his brother, Stephen Kay Morley, of Morley Brothers Drug Company, which invented and patented many popular old remedies and gradually grew to include locations in several states. Christopher Morley's parents divorced and he and his brother were raised by their mother and allowed little contact with their father, a prominent veterinarian in El Paso, Texas.

== Education ==
Morley was accepted to UCLA in 1969 with a major in mathematics. Once at UCLA, he changed his major to dance and studied ballet with Mia Slavenska. He also studied ballet with Stanley Holden at the Los Angeles Music Center. He performed with the Santa Monica Ballet at the Santa Monica Civic Auditorium in their production of The Nutcracker. Later, he obtained a license in cosmetology and worked in Vidal Sasoon's hair salon in Beverly Hills as well as in Jon Peters' hair salon, on Rodeo Drive.

== Career ==
Morley specialized in cross-dressing roles in the 1970s and 1980s. He played numerous parts in television and movies, most known for his parts in Freebie and the Bean (1974) and General Hospital (1980). In General Hospital, Morley played Sally Armitage, owner of a bar and a friend of Laura. The role was played straight and attracted the flirtatious interest of Luke until Morley's character finally revealed he was a man. Once revealed as a male, Morley's character became part of a plot to hold Luke and Laura's lives as ransom, in exchange for hidden gold. After the gold was found, Morley's character was killed in a gunfight. On an episode of Magnum, P.I., he played David Bannister, a disgraced operative for the British MI6 intelligence service who was dismissed for being openly transvestite. Bannister becomes a deadly efficient ruthless international assassin available to the highest bidder, always operating in female guise. Morley was featured as a female impersonator in a pictorial article in the May 1975 issue of Playboy, photographed by Mario Casilli.

In the 1980s and 1990s Morley was one of the foremost Marilyn Monroe impressionists, starring at the La Cage aux Folles Dinner Theatre in Los Angeles. Later he toured with their various road shows, An Evening At La Cage, playing Las Vegas, Toronto, Taipei, and Helsinki.

== Death ==
Morley died on November 2, 2023, at the age of 72.

== Filmography ==
=== Film ===
- All About Alice (1972) - Alice Barrington
- Freebie and the Bean (1974) - Transvestite
- Hard Knocks (1979) - Mitch
- Love Streams (1984) - Female Impersonator
- Bachelor Party (1984) - She-Tim
- Hollywood Harry (1986) - Claudia
- Howling VI: The Freaks (1991) - Carl/Carlotta
- Don't Tell Mom the Babysitter's Dead (1991)

=== Television ===
- Bronk (1 episode, 1975) - Jackie LaCruce
- Vega$ (1 episode, 1980) - Michelle Pasquale
- General Hospital (Unknown episodes, 1980)
- Magnum, P.I. (1 episode, 1982) - David Bannister
- Too Close for Comfort (1 episode, 1982) - Pat
- Making of a Male Model (1983, TV Movie) - Female Impersonator #2
- T. J. Hooker (1 episode, 1984) - Dwight
- Hunter (1 episode, 1991) - Mr. Stevens
- An Inconvenient Woman (1991) - Marilyn
- Us (1991, TV Movie) - Man / Woman
- Roseanne (1 episode, 1995)
