= EJ Jallorina =

Filipina actress (born 1993)

- Born: January 21, 1993 (age 33)
- Years active: 2000s–present
- Notable work: Goin' Bulilit (2000s); Marupok AF (2023); Dreamboi (2025)

EJ Jallorina (born January 21, 1993) is a Filipino actor.

== Early life and education ==
EJ Jallorina was born on January 21, 1993. He attended Nazarene Catholic School in Quiapo, Manila for his high school studies.

== Career ==
Jallorina had his debut in the entertainment industry in the 2000s as a child actor. He was part of the cast of the ABS-CBN gag show Goin' Bulilit and was known for his role as an impersonator of Boy Abunda for a skit spoofing The Buzz. During his teenage years, Auraeus Solito cast Jallorina for his 2007 film Pisay. Around this time, Jallorina would often be cast in gay (bakla) roles such as in Manay Po 2: Overload where he played as the gay male best friend of Jiro Manio. He was comfortable in accepting such roles despite not identifying as bakla.

Later on, he came out as transgender when playing a young trans woman in the 2018 film Mamu: And A Mother Too. Jallorina later appeared in the 2022 GMA Network drama romance series What We Could Be.

He has appeared in feature films featuring trans women such as Marupok AF and Dreamboi

== Personal life ==
Jallorina identifies as a transgender woman and has been open about this part of her identity since 2018. Jallorina identifies as trans and non-binary but prefers to be referred to in feminine terms.
