= 2025 Cinemalaya =

Filipino independent film festival

21st Cinemalaya Independent Film Festival
- Official festival poster
- Location: Metro Manila, Philippines
- Film titles: 10
- Festival date: October 3–11, 2025
- Language: English, Filipino, Bikol
- Website: www.cinemalaya.org

Cinemalaya chronology
- 2026 2024

The 21st Cinemalaya Independent Film Festival was held from October 3 to 11, 2025 in Metro Manila, Philippines.

The main venue of the film festival is the Shangri-La Plaza in Mandaluyong.

This edition, described as "streamlined", faced reduced funding from the Cultural Center of the Philippines, with events outside the competitions scrapped. The schedule of Cinemalaya was shifted from the customary August to October.

== Entries ==
The winning film is highlighted with boldface and a dagger.

Feature films

| Title | Director | Starring | Genre |
|---|---|---|---|
| **Bloom Where You are Planted** ^{†} | Noni Abao | N/A | Documentary |
| Child No. 82 | Tim Rone Villanueva | JM Ibarra, Rochelle Pangilinan, and Vhong Navarro | Comedy drama, Fantasy |
| Cinemartyrs | Sari Dalena | 27 billed cast members | Drama |
| Habang Nilalamon ng Hydra ang Kasaysayan | Dustin Celestino | Dolly de Leon, Jojit Lorenzo, Zanjoe Marudo, Mylene Dizon | Existential drama |
| Open Endings | Nigel Santos | Janella Salvador, Klea Pineda, Jasmine Curtis-Smith | Romance drama, LGBTQ |
| Padamlágan | Jenn Romano | Ely Buendia, Esteban Mara, Sue Prado, Floyd Tena | Historical drama |
| Paglilitis | Raymund Barcelon; Cheska Marfori | Eula Valdez, Jackie Lou Blanco, Sid Lucero, Leo Martinez | Drama |
| Raging | Ryan Machado | Elijah Canlas, Ron Angeles, Glenn Sevilla Mas, Nathan Sotto | Drama |
| Republika ng Pipolipinas | Renei Dimla | Geraldine Villamil, Alessandra De Rossi, Kakki Teodoro | Mockumentary |
| Warla | Kevin Alambra; Arah Badayos | Lance Reblando, KaladKaren, Serena Magiliw, Valeria Ortega, Jacky Woo, Dimples Romana | Social Drama |

Short films

| Title | Director |
|---|---|
| Ascension from the Office Cubicle | Hannah Silvestre |
| Figat | Handiong Kapuno |
| Hasang | Daniel de la Cruz |
| I'm Best Left Inside My Head | Elian Idioma |
| Kay Basta Angkarabo Yay Bagay Ibat Ha Langit | Marie Estela Paiso |
| Kung Tugnaw ang Kaidalman Sang Lawod | Seth Andrew Blanca |
| Please Keep This Copy | Miguel Lorenzo Peralta |
| Radikals | Arvin Belarmino |
| **The Next 24 Hours** ^{†} | Carl Joseph Papa |
| Water Sports | Whammy Alcazaren |

== Awards ==
2025 Cinemalaya Awards Night
- Date: October 12, 2025
- Site: Shangri-La Plaza, Mandaluyong

Highlights
- Best Picture: Bloom Where You Are Planted
- Best Director: Sari Dalena (Cinemartyrs)
- Best Actor: Jojit Lorenzo (Hydra)
- Best Actress: Mylene Dizon (Hydra)
- Most awards: Cinemartyrs; Child No. 82; Hydra (3 each)

The awards ceremony was held on October 12, 2025, at the Shangri-La Plaza in Mandaluyong.

Feature films

- Best Film – Bloom Where You Are Planted by Noni Abao
  - Special Jury Award – Cinemartyrs by Sari Dalena
  - Audience Choice Award – Child No. 82 by Tim Rone Villanueva
- Best Direction – Sari Dalena for Cinemartyrs
- Best Actor – Jojit Lorenzo for Habang Nilalamon ng Hydra ang Kasaysayan
- Best Actress – Mylene Dizon for Habang Nilalamon ng Hydra ang Kasaysayan
- Best Supporting Actor – Nanding Josef for Habang Nilalamon ng Hydra Ang Kasaysayan
- Best Supporting Actress – Rochelle Pangilinan for Child No. 82
- Best Screenplay – Tim Rone Villanueva and Herlyn Alegre for Child No. 82
- Best Cinematography – Theo Lozada for Raging
- Best Editing – Che Tagyamon for Bloom Where You Are Planted
- Best Sound – Lamberto Casas Jr. for Raging
- Best Original Music Score – Teresa Barrozo for Cinemartyrs
- Best Production Design – Jeric Delos Angeles for Padamlagan

Short films

- Best Film – The Next 24 Hours by Carl Joseph Papa
  - Special Jury Award – Kay Basta Angkarabo Yay Bagay Ibat ha Langit
  - Audience Choice Award – Ascencion for the Office Cubicle by Hannah Silvestre
- Best Screenplay – Figat by Handiong Kapuno
- Best Direction – Elian Idioma for I'm Left Inside My Head

Special awards

- NETPAC Full-length Feature Award: Republika ng Pipolipinas by Renei Dimla
- NETPAC Short Film Award: Hasang by Daniel de la Cruz
