= Kai Montinola =

Filipino actress and singer (born 2006)

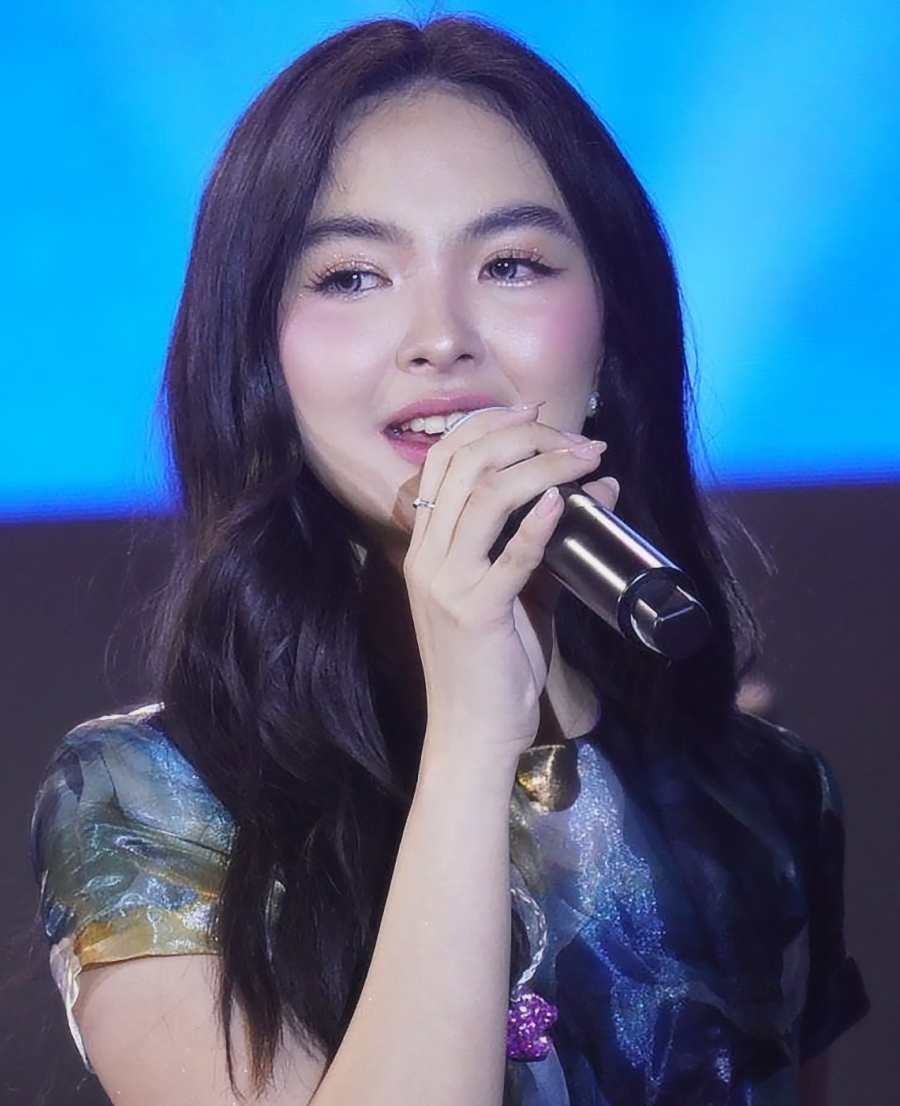
- Montinola in 2026
- Born: Kaisha Denniel Quilario Montinola; December 12, 2006 (age 19); Cebu, Philippines
- Occupations: Actress; singer
- Years active: 2024–present
- Agent: Star Magic (2024–present)
- Known for: Pinoy Big Brother: Gen 11

Kaisha Denniel Quilario Montinola (born December 12, 2006) is a Filipino actress and singer. She rose to prominence in 2024 as a finalist on the reality television series Pinoy Big Brother: Gen 11, where she placed fourth. Following her stint on reality TV, she signed with Star Magic and pursued a career in music and acting, releasing her debut extended play Kaileidoscope in 2025.

== Early life ==
Kaisha Denniel Quilario Montinola was born on December 12, 2006 in Cebu, Philippines. She was dubbed the "Singing Gwapa of Cebu" (Singing Beauty of Cebu) during her introduction on reality television. During her time as a Pinoy Big Brother contestant in 2024, she met her biological mother for the first time.

== Career ==
=== 2024: Pinoy Big Brother ===
In 2024, Montinola became a housemate for Pinoy Big Brother: Gen 11. She reached the finale of the competition, finishing in fourth place. The season was won by Fyang Smith.

=== 2025–present: Acting and music debut ===
Following her exit from Pinoy Big Brother, Montinola signed with the talent management agency Star Magic. Her career is managed by Erik Miras, with Adrianne Concepcion serving as her stylist.

Montinola made her acting debut in January 2025 with a cameo appearance in the drama series Saving Grace, the Philippine adaptation of the Japanese drama Mother. She played the teenage version of the character Grace, portrayed by Zia Grace and Julia Montes. Later that year, she starred in an episode of the drama anthology Maalaala Mo Kaya alongside Kyle Echarri. She played the role of Lenie Aycardo, a makeup content creator.

In June 2025, Montinola launched her music career under the StarPop label. She released her debut extended play titled Kaileidoscope. The EP, produced by Rox Santos, contains seven tracks including "Hay Naku", "Self Love Era", "Overthink", "Kung Pwede", "For You", "No Conversation", and "Shooting Star". Upon release, the album topped the iTunes Philippines albums chart. To support the release, she held a launch concert titled Kai's the Limit at the SM North EDSA Skydome on June 28, 2025. Guests included Echarri and fellow PBB alumnus Jarren Garcia.

In July 2025, Montinola appeared on the variety show It's Showtime as a judge for the segment "Escort Mo, Show Mo", where she performed a duet of "Bakit Ngayon Ka Lang" with Ogie Alcasid.

Her first feature film appearance was in the independent film Child No. 82, an entry to the 2025 Cinemalaya Philippine Independent Film Festival. Directed by Tim Rone Villanueva, the film also starred Vhong Navarro and Rochelle Pangilinan.

In September 2025, she was announced as a cast member for the action-drama series Roja, starring Donny Pangilinan and Kyle Echarri. Montinola portrays a guest at a resort in the series.

== Other activities ==
=== Endorsements ===
In 2025, she became an endorser for the skincare brand HebeSkin. Montinola joins in Sunsilk Shampoo along with Belle Mariano and Ashtine Olviga.

=== Philanthropy ===
Montinola has been involved in charitable activities. Following the 2025 Cebu earthquake, she organized a private donation drive with friends to assist victims in her hometown.

== Public image ==
Montinola was included in Mega's Women to Watch 2025 line-up. Jewil Anne M. Tabiolo of SunStar Cebu identified "sleek, pin-straight hair" and "delicate features" as Montinola's trademarks. She added that Montinola's charm "reach[es] beyond the curated gloss of [a] fashion editorial", praising the actress for her wisdom and intelligence "beyond her years" as well. Likewise, Hannah Mallorca of the Philippine Daily Inquirer described Montinola's features as "doll-like" and commended her "undeniable wit". The newspaper included her in their list of potential breakout stars for 2026.

== Artistry ==
In a Rolling Stone Philippines article published on May 27, 2025, Montinola's then-upcoming solo concert Kai's the Limit was criticized by writer Elijah Pareño. He pointed out that Montinola was still a new artist with no original songs at the time, and deemed her solo show to be a part of a pattern in which concerts become "glorified meet-and-greets", devaluing art. On the other hand, Julienne Loreto of the British music magazine The Line of Best Fit acknowledged that Montinola's career trajectory is fast, but said that she truly deserves the attention. They praised Montinola's "remarkably clear-eyed vision" as a musician and the "refinement and sophistication" of her voice. Loreto favorably compared Montinola's sound to Olivia Dean's and emphasized how her music reflects Gen Z anxieties. Her debut album Kaileidoscope was included in the magazine's year-end Staff Picks listicle.

== Discography ==
=== Extended plays ===
| Title | Album details | Ref. |
|---|---|---|
| Kaileidoscope | Released: June 30, 2025; Label: StarPop; Formats: Digital download, streaming | |

=== Singles ===
| Title | Year | Album | Ref. |
|---|---|---|---|
| "Hay Naku" | 2025 | Kaileidoscope | |
| "Self Love Era" | 2025 | Kaileidoscope | |
| "Overthink" | 2025 | Kaileidoscope | |
| "Shooting Star" (feat. Jarren Garcia) | 2025 | Kaileidoscope | |
| "Thank You for the Love" (with Rain Celmar and Kolette Madelo) | 2025 | Non-album single | |

== Filmography ==
=== Film ===
| Year | Title | Role | Ref. |
|---|---|---|---|
| 2025 | Child No. 82 | Rizza | |
| 2026 | Unfiltered | Hiraya | |

=== Television ===
| Year | Title | Role | Ref. |
|---|---|---|---|
| 2024 | Pinoy Big Brother: Gen 11 | Contestant (Housemate) | |
| 2024 | Kuan on One | Guest | |
| 2025–present | ASAP XP | Performer / Host | |
| 2025 | Saving Grace | Teenage Grace | |
| 2025 | Maalaala Mo Kaya: Make-up | Lenie Aycardo | |
| 2025 | It's Showtime | Guest | |
| 2025 | Rainbow Rumble | Guest (contestant) | |
| 2025 | Roja | Isabella "Ice" Mercado | |
| 2026 | Your Face Sounds Familiar 4 | Round 12 guest performer as Lea Salonga | |

== Awards and nominations ==
| Year | Award giving body | Category | Nominated work | Results | Ref. |
|---|---|---|---|---|---|
| 2025 | Anak TV Seal Awards | Female Net Makabata Star | —N/a | Won | |
| 2026 | Philippine Arts, Film and Television Awards (PAFTA) | Youth Icon Award | —N/a | Won | |

== See also ==
- List of Pinoy Big Brother housemates
