= Child No. 82 =

- Theatrical release poster
- Directed by: Tim Rone Villanueva
- Screenplay by: Tim Rone Villanueva; Herlyn Alegre
- Story by: Arvin Belarmino; Herlyn Alegre
- Produced by: Arvin Belarmino; Johndel Tacata
- Starring: JM Ibarra; Rochelle Pangilinan; Vhong Navarro
- Cinematography: Rap Ramirez
- Edited by: Vanessa Ubas de Leon
- Music by: Pepe Manikan
- Production company: Outplay Media Production
- Release date: October 3, 2025 (Cinemalaya)
- Running time: 110 minutes
- Country: Philippines
- Language: Filipino

Child No. 82: Anak ni Boy Kana is a 2025 Philippine fantasy drama comedy film directed by Tim Rone Villanueva under Outplay Media Production starring JM Ibarra, Rochelle Pangilinan, and Vhong Navarro.

The film revolves around Max, a young father seeking inheritance from Boy Kana, a recently deceased action star who sired more than 80 children by proving to be the actor's 82nd child.

== Plot ==
Max is a livestreamer who is the illegitimate son of Maximo "Boy Kana" Maniego Sr., a popular action star turned politician, and his former film assistant, Ali, who now works as a weaver in Pinili. After Max impregnates his girlfriend Marie May and gets into a fight after he refuses to assume responsibility for the child, Max chastises Ali for concealing him from his father and failing to provide him with a birth certificate. He resolves to go to his residence in Cavite, only to learn in a news bulletin that his father has just died, leaving behind nearly 100 children whom he had issued with a "Boy Kana" card, a proof of parental identity that guarantees its holders financial benefits.

Max arrives to find hordes of mourners at the Maniego residence, along with others claiming to be Boy Kana's children, including Rizza, who is seeking treatment for a rare heart condition that runs in the Maniego family. Max feigns Rizza's symptoms to gain the trust of Mother Betty, the president of a Boy Kana fan club. As Betty sings Boy Kana's praises, Ali arrives and reveals Max is not sick, to Betty’s wrath. Ali takes Max aside and finally explains that Boy Kana reneged on his promise to join her and leave his wife Perla after they had an affair, and that she fled to Pinili after Perla offered to raise Max in exchange for Ali cutting off ties with the Maniegos. Max forgives Ali and resolves to go home. On their way out, Max apologizes to Mother Betty, but the latter realizes the truth of Max's parentage after she remembers that Boy Kana did have an affair with Ali. Mother Betty, frustrated at Perla barring her from seeing Boy Kana one last time, agrees to help Max see his father by helping him break into the Maniego mansion.

Inside, Max is chased by the Maniegos' dog and hides in the women's restroom, where he stumbles upon Boy Kana's only legitimate child, Maximo Jr., who was disowned for coming out as gay and now goes by the name Coca Royales. The two become sympathetic to each other's plight, with Coca helping Max distract the guards on his way to see their late father. Arriving at the viewing hall, Max discovers that his father's corpse is a mannequin as Perla arrives and leads him to an urn containing Boy Kana's ashes. Perla reveals that Boy Kana was an irresponsible father in real life and tasked Perla instead with looking out for his illegitimate children, which include posing as an anonymous customer for Ali's textiles and a pseudonymic fan of Max's livestreams. Perla offers to make Max a famous film star like his father, but Max, disillusioned by Boy Kana's neglect, rejects the offer and leaves with Ali before Perla can present him with his own Boy Kana card.

After returning to Pinili, Ali provides Max with his birth certificate, enabling him to graduate high school. Max, determined to avoid repeating his father's mistakes, reconciles with Marie May and accepts responsibility for their child.

== Cast ==
- JM Ibarra as Maximo "Max" Maniego Jr. , a young father who believes himself to be an illegitimate son of recently deceased Boy Kana, a famed actor who was also his biggest role model. Ibarra described his character as an "unacknowledged nepo baby" This is the first lead role and feature film role for the former Pinoy Big Brother: Gen 11 contestant. Director Villanueva admitted having low expectations for the novice actor but concluded he did not disappoint in portraying Max.

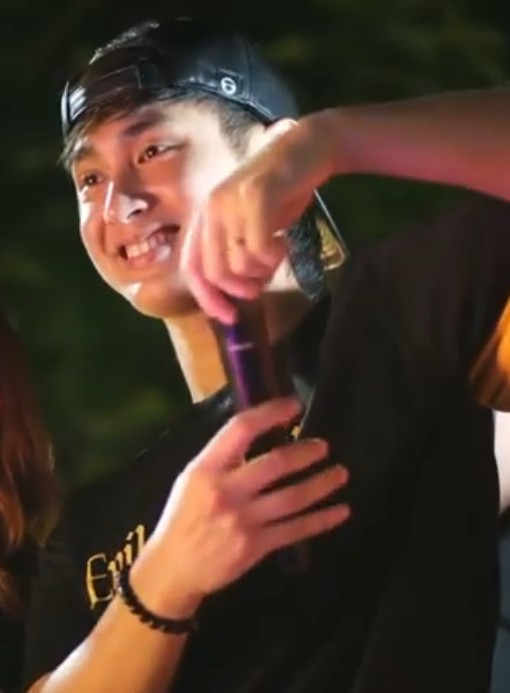
JM Ibarra

Ibarra drew inspiration from his own relationship with his real life father. He describe his character's conflict as having to choose between the promise of luxury of his celebrity father's inheritance or waking up to the truth about the identity of Boy Kana.

- Vhong Navarro as Maximo "Boy Kana" Maniego Sr., a famous action star in Philippine cinema who has recently died and entrusted his estate to his more than 80 children.
- Rochelle Pangilinan as Ali, Max's mother; Ibarra described Pangilinan as having no shortcomings in raising Max as a mother.
- Dexter Doria as Perla, Boy Kana's widow
- Irma Adlawan as Mother Betty, the president of Boy Kana's fan club
- Kai Montinola as Rizza, an illegitimate child of Boy Kana
- Zairene Fernandez as Marie May, Max's girlfriend
- Inah Evans as Maximo Maniego Jr./Coca Royales, Boy Kana's only legitimate child.

== Production ==
Child No. 82 was directed by Tim Rone Villanueva under Outplay Media Production with support from the Cinemalaya Foundation, Film Development Council of the Philippines, Cultural Center of the Philippines, National Commission for Culture and the Arts and the RSVP Film Studios. Principal photography took place in Pinili, Ilocos Norte. The production team wanted to create a film that tackles issues faced by children born out of wedlock who grew up without one parent.

== Release ==
Child No. 82 premiered at the 21st Cinemalaya which started on October 3, 2025.

== Accolades ==
Year	Award	Category	Recipient(s)	Result	Ref.
2025	Cinemalaya	Audience Choice Award	Child No. 82	Won	
2025	Cinemalaya	Best Supporting Actress	Rochelle Pangilinan	Won	
2025	Cinemalaya	Best Screenplay	Tim Rone Villanueva and Herlyn Alegre	Won	
