= Habang Nilalamon ng Hydra ang Kasaysayan =

- Theatrical release poster
- Directed by: Dustin Celestino
- Screenplay by: Dustin Celestino
- Produced by: Janel Gutierrez Celestino
- Starring: Dolly de Leon; Jojit Lorenzo; Zanjoe Marudo; Mylene Dizon
- Cinematography: Kara Moreno
- Edited by: John Rogers
- Music by: Paulo Protacio
- Production company: Cine Mutu
- Release date: October 3, 2025 (Cinemalaya)
- Running time: 120 minutes
- Country: Philippines
- Language: Filipino

Habang Nilalamon ng Hydra ang Kasaysayan or As The Hydra Devours History is a 2025 Philippine film written and directed by Dustin Celestino. Starring Dolly de Leon, Jojit Lorenzo, Zanjoe Marudo, and Mylene Dizon, the film revolves around four people dealing with the aftermath of the loss of presidential candidate Eleanor Robles in the 2022 elections.

Produced by Cine Mutu Productions, in association with Nathan Studios, Narra Post-Production Studios, E&H Productions, and Barebones, and support from Film Development Council of the Philippines, the film was theatrically released on October 3, 2025, as part of Cinemalaya.

== Cast ==
- Dolly de Leon as Bea Consuelo, a woman whose father disappeared during the authoritarian regime of the father of the 2022 election's president-elect
- Jojit Lorenzo as Kiko Consuelo, Robles' campaign manager and the husband of Bea.
- Zanjoe Marudo as David Cruz, a speechwriter for Robles and a Greek mythology professor who resumes writing a book on Philippine politics using the hydra as a metaphor
- Mylene Dizon as Mela, an election lawyer who meets Cruz on a dating app
- Frances Makil-Ignacio as Eleanor Robles, a losing candidate for president of the Philippines in the 2022 elections

== Production ==
Habang Nilalamon ng Hydra ang Kasaysayan was produced under Cine Metu and had Dustin Celestino as its director, who also guided the production of 2023 Cinemalaya Special Jury prize winner Ang Duyan ng Magiting. Nathan Studios also provided funding during the post-production phase. Kara Moreno was the cinematographer; Benjamin Padero and Carlo Tabije were the production designers. Nicole Rosacay did the sound design while Paulo Protacio did the score. John Rogers edited the film.

=== Conceptualization and themes ===
Hydra was inspired from the result of the 2022 Philippine elections. Celestino describes that the film is a "love letter to the Kakampinks" and intends to provide a sense of "hope" to supporters of losing candidate Leni Robredo who ran for president. He wrote the draft for Hydra interviewing people on Robredo's campaign a year after the vote. He also admits the film which heavily makes references to Greek mythology is for a niche market.

Hydra was based on Celestino's own insights following the aftermath of the elections. The film is described as an "existential drama" by the director. In relation to the film's creation, he insists that the hydra is a metaphor for disinformation, corruption, and one's relationship to history.

=== Narrative device ===
Celestino intended an "impressionistic" approach to making Hydra describing the narrative structure as like a "rainbow" where a story covers the perspective of a first character in chapter one and finishes it in chapter eight, a second character starts theirs in chapter two and ends in seven, and so on. He names this device the "Symphonic Arc structure," which he says is similar to the novel Cloud Atlas. Celestino admits that using this approach is an experiment and may not be followed by the audience.

=== Filming ===
The principal photography for Hydra took six days with post-production work done from mid-April until early September 2025.

== Release ==
Hydra premiered at the 21st Cinemalaya which started on October 3, 2025.

== Accolades ==
Hydra garnered three awards at the 2025 Cinemalaya Awards Night; all three being acting accolades.

Year	Award	Category	Recipient(s)	Result	Ref.
2025	Cinemalaya	Best Actor	Jojit Lorenzo	Won	
2025	Cinemalaya	Best Actress	Mylene Dizon	Won	
2025	Cinemalaya	Best Supporting Actor	Nanding Josef	Won	
