= Magkaagaw =

Philippine television drama series

- Title card
- Also known as: Broken Faith
- Genre: Drama
- Created by: Nehemiarey Dallego
- Written by: Richard "Dode" Cruz; Luningning Interino-Ribay; Renato Custodio
- Directed by: Gil Tejada Jr.
- Creative director: Aloy Adlawan
- Starring: Sheryl Cruz; Sunshine Dizon; Klea Pineda; Jeric Gonzales
- Theme music composer: Natasha L. Correos
- Opening theme: "Kahit Ganun Pa Man" by Maricris Garcia
- Country of origin: Philippines
- Original language: Tagalog
- No. of episodes: 160 (list of episodes)

Production
- Executive producers: Darling P. Torres; Joy Lumboy-Pili; Mychal Feraren; Joseph Aleta
- Editors: Maita Dator-Causapin; Lawrence John Villena; Arturo Damaso Jr.; Kent dela Cruz
- Camera setup: Multiple-camera setup
- Running time: 21–36 minutes
- Production company: GMA Entertainment Group

Original release
- Network: GMA Network
- Release: October 21, 2019 – March 31, 2021

Magkaagaw (transl. takers / international title: Broken Faith) is a Philippine television drama series broadcast by GMA Network. Directed by Gil Tejada Jr., it stars Sheryl Cruz, Sunshine Dizon, Klea Pineda and Jeric Gonzales. It premiered on October 21, 2019 on the network's Afternoon Prime and Sabado Star Power sa Hapon line up. The series concluded on March 31, 2021, with a total of 160 episodes.

The series is streaming online on YouTube.

== Premise ==
Veron is left by her husband Mario to be with Laura, which leads to Veron's vengeance that will result in bad circumstances. Decades later, Clarisse, Laura's daughter gets hired to be Veron's assistant. Veron will engage in an affair with Clarisse's husband, Jio once she discovers Clarisse is related to Laura.

== Cast and characters ==
Lead cast

- Sheryl Cruz as Veron Razon
- Sunshine Dizon as Laura Ramirez-Santos
- Klea Pineda as Clarisse Santos-Almonte
- Jeric Gonzales as Jio Almonte

Supporting cast

- Polo Ravales as Oliver de Villa / Aldo
- Dion Ignacio as Zander Rodriguez
- Dennis Padilla as Mark Veloso
- Lovely Abella as Suzanna "Suzi" Gomez
- Isay Alvarez as Felicita "Fely" Ramirez
- Patricia Tumulak as Gilda Razon
- Jhoana Marie Tan as Sheila Herrera

Guest cast

- Alfred Vargas as Mario Santos
- Cassandra Lavarias as Jade S. Almonte
- Fabio Ide as Jose Francisco Pereira
- Joseph Ison as Alfonso
- Tess Bomb as Toyang
- Shermaine Santiago as Ryzza
- Jenny Miller as Nora Tan
- Cai Cortez as Kitchie

== Production ==
Principal photography commenced in September 2019. Filming was halted in March 2020 due to the enhanced community quarantine in Luzon caused by the COVID-19 pandemic. Filming was continued in November 2020. Filming concluded in December 2020. The series resumed its programming on February 15, 2021.

== Ratings ==
According to AGB Nielsen Philippines' Nationwide Urban Television Audience Measurement People in television homes, the pilot episode of Magkaagaw earned a 7% rating.

== Accolades ==
Accolades received by Magkaagaw
Year	Award	Category	Recipient	Result	Ref.
2021	34th PMPC Star Awards for Television	Best Daytime Drama Series	Magkaagaw	Won	
2021	34th PMPC Star Awards for Television	Best Drama Actor	Jeric Gonzales	Nominated	
2021	34th PMPC Star Awards for Television	Best Drama Actress	Sunshine Dizon	Nominated	
