= Warla (film) =

- Theatrical release poster
- Directed by: Kevin Alambra
- Screenplay by: Arah Jell Badayos
- Produced by: Sheron Dayoc
- Starring: Lance Reblado; KaladKaren; Serena Magiliw; Valeria Ortega; Jacky Woo
- Cinematography: Neil Daza
- Edited by: Ilsa Malsi
- Music by: Paulo Almaden
- Production company: Southern Lantern Production
- Release date: October 3, 2025 (Cinemalaya)
- Running time: 90 minutes
- Country: Philippines
- Language: Filipino

Warla is a 2025 Philippine crime drama film directed by Kevin Alambra. It revolves around the Warla, an all-transgender women criminal syndicate who kidnaps foreign men to fund their gender-affirming surgeries.

== Premise ==
Kitkat is a 19-year old trans woman who struggles to get accepted for who she is by her own family. She is taken in by Joice, the leader of Warla, an all-trans women gang who kidnaps foreigners to fund the members' gender-affirming surgeries. She finds home among the group but begins to feel conflicted about the Warla's methods. Kitkat finds no need to medically transition to affirm her womanhood while her peers within the group like Luningning and Barbie Ann suffers from gender dysphoria and is insistent that the surgeries will alleviate their suffering.

== Cast ==
- Lance Reblando as Kitkat; a Star Magic actress, Warla marks as Reblando's first lead role.
- KaladKaren as Joice, the leader of the Warla. KaladKaren had to learn how to drive a van for the role.
- Serena Magiliw
- Valeria Ortega
- Jacky Woo
- Dimples Romana

== Production ==
=== Conceptualization ===
Warla was the directorial debut of Kevin Alambra, head of research for Maalaala Mo Kaya, a drama anthology television series which ended in December 2022.

Alambra became aware of Warla, a group of transgender women. The group had some of its members arrested in an October 2022 incident allegedly for kidnapping foreigners to demand ransom to fund their gender-affirming surgery. The incident reminded Alambra of a "Filipino version" of favorite screenplay Dog Day Afternoon and wondered how these women came to that point.

His trans woman friend and advocate Mela Habijan encouraged Alambra to adopt the Warla group's story as subject of his first Cinemalaya film. Alambra referred to Hil Malatino's book Trans Care served and interviews with trans women in making the film. He conclude that it was worthy to explore the empathy of trans women he interviewed for the Warla.

He worked with screenwriter Arah Jell Badayos for the story. Alambra and Badayos further refined the script through Cinemalaya's film lab in April 2024. They consulted Brenda Alegre, a doctor and one of the earlier members of The Society of Trans Women of the Philippines human rights group for feedback. Alambra also visited a gender clinic in Bangkok learning how its a preferred destination for Filipino trans women for the affordability of gender affirming surgery convincing the director the need to advance trans health care in the Philippines.

The duo also collaborated with the Philippine National Police Criminal Investigation and Detection Group (PNP-CIDG) to help them build the storyline since Warla is based on the group of the same name that got involved in the 2022 criminal incident.

Alambra insists that the film does not glorify the crimes of the Warla group but rather portrays a group of women who turn to crime refusing to become victims. He also meant to put transgender people at the forefront since they are usually relegated as side characters in media if they appear at all.

=== Filming ===
Principal photography for Warla took place in seven days spread across between July to August with an all-transgender main cast. Filming locations included Quiapo in Manila, Marikina, Cavite, and San Mateo, Rizal. Editing was done after and was finished within the month including the creation of an original soundtrack, also titled after the film.

== Release ==
Warla premiered at the 21st Cinemalaya which started on October 3, 2025.

== Reception ==
Dreamboi director and trans woman Rodina Singh admitted she felt uncomfortable watching Warla. She questioned on why dead trans character is shown in a river with neck broken few minutes in the film and remarked how unnecessary it was to be reminded that transgender people faces danger everyday. She underscored why transgender stories are preferred to be told by trans people themselves. She however praised Warla for using a transgender actresses for the main cast.
