= Open Endings =

- Directed by: Nigel Santos
- Screenplay by: Keavy Eunice Vicente
- Produced by: Tin Velasco
- Starring: Janella Salvador; Klea Pineda; Jasmine Curtis-Smith; Leanne Mamonong
- Cinematography: Martika Ramirez Escobar
- Edited by: Maria Estela Paiso
- Distributed by: Cinemalaya; CreaZion Studios
- Release dates: August 2025 (Cinemalaya); June 10, 2026 (Philippines)
- Running time: 110 minutes
- Country: Philippines
- Language: Filipino

Open Endings is a 2025 Philippine LGBTQ drama romance film directed by Nigel Santos, starring Janella Salvador, Klea Pineda, Jasmine Curtis-Smith, and Leanne Mamonong. It revolves around four lesbians who are rebuilding their friendships despite their shared history in romance.

== Cast ==
- Janella Salvador as Charito Lyn "Charlie" de Guzman. Salvador recounts how she enjoyed portraying the "independence and messiness" of Charlie as a character. Keavy Vicente, the writer of the film, had already made Charlie's character based on Salvador's prior roles in Be Careful With My Heart and Oh My G even before Salvador accepted the role.
- Klea Pineda as Marikit "Kit" Pineda. Pineda, the actress, narrates how she and her character are "the same in real life" who values friendship as important. Klea Pineda is openly queer.
- Jasmine Curtis-Smith as Hannah Gabrielle Lopez. Curtis-Smith describes Hannah as the character with the "maternal instincts" among the group and the reason for the quartet to start hanging out again. She wanted to portray Hannah as still "lovable and emotionally balanced" even after the character's breakup.
- Leanne Mamonong as Amihan "Mihan" Villanueva. This is Mamonong's debut in a feature film. Mamonong is a member of the indie pop duo Leanne & Naara. Mamonong like her character is also queer.

The four main characters portrayed by the four actresses are depicted as lesbians who are exes to each other who are rebuilding their friendships.

== Production ==
Open Endings is a film directed by Nigel Santos and its screenplay made by Keavy Eunice Vicente. Santos described the film's characters as being based on a "stage" of the lives of Vicente and herself also citing Mike Nichols' 2004 film Closer as an inspiration. Santos felt a need to create a LGBTQ film which is "light and relatable" with the prevalence of coming-of-age and tragic LGBTQ films. While romantic relationships are part of the film, Santos underscored that she wanted to put focus on queer friendship. Open Endings deals with four women who were formerly a romantic relationship to each other and began hanging out with each other again to rebuild their friendship.

Principal photography finished in May 2025.

== Release ==
Open Endings was an entrant film in the 21st Cinemalaya in October 2025. It was described as the film festival's top box office grossing entry.

It had an internation release as part of the Wicked Queer LGBTQIA+ Film Festival in Boston in the United States in April 2026, and was also featured at the Queer East Festival in London the following month.

The film had a wider commercial theatrical release in cinemas in the Philippines on June 10, 2026.
