= Fyang =

Filipino television and social media personality (born 2006)

Fyang Smith
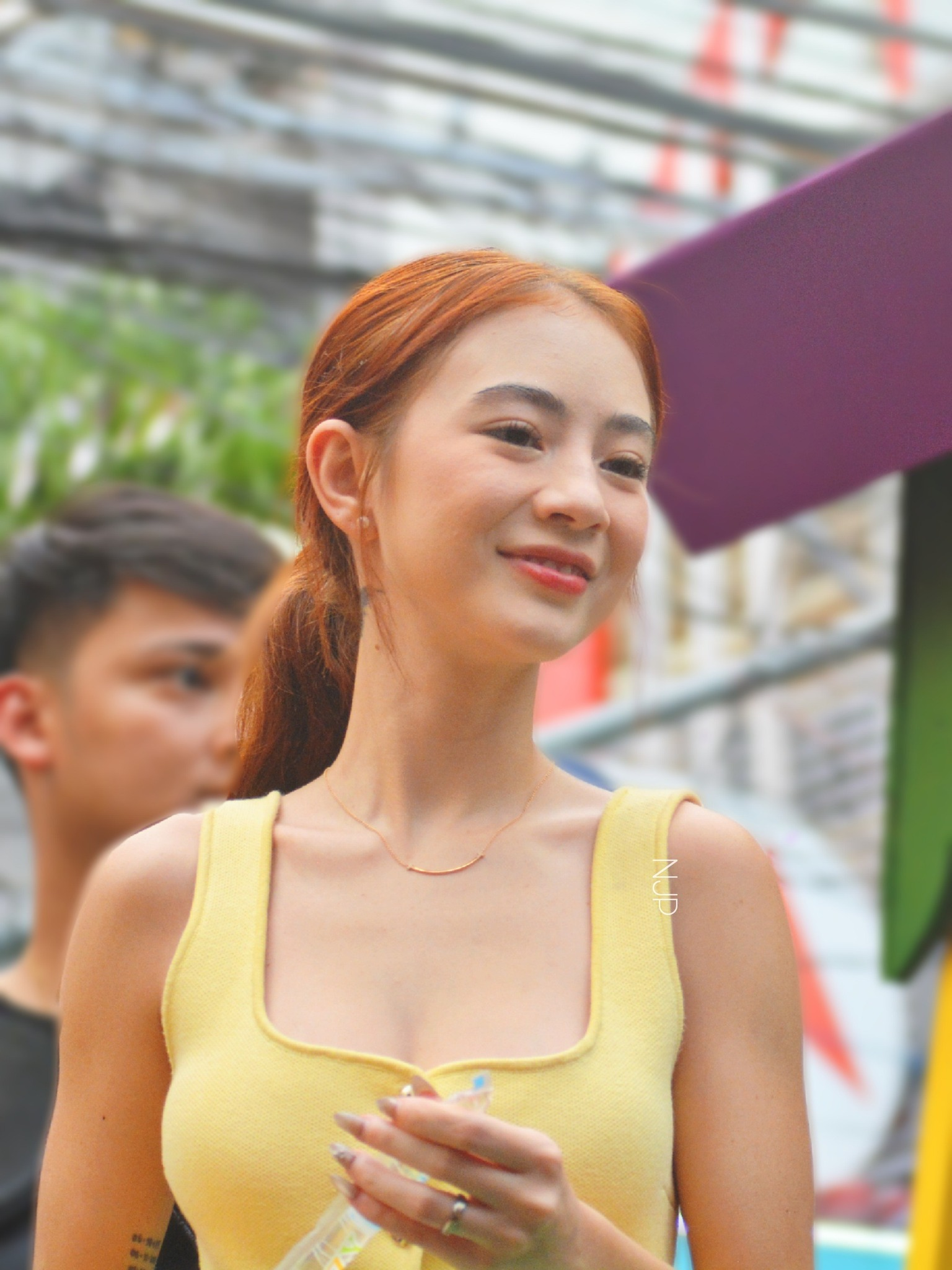
- Fyang in 2025
- Born: Ashley Sofia Dansico Smith; May 13, 2006 (age 20); Mandaluyong, Metro Manila, Philippines
- Citizenship: United States; Philippines
- Occupations: Actress; content creator
- Years active: 2024–present
- Agent: Star Magic (since 2024)
- Title: PBB Gen 11; Big Winner
- Predecessor: (Kumunity Season 10) Anji Salvacion
- Successor: (Collab Edition 1.0) Brent Manalo & Mika Salamanca

Ashley Sofia Dansico Smith (born May 13, 2006), known mononymously as Fyang, is a Filipino actress and content creator. She rose to national prominence winning the reality show Pinoy Big Brother: Gen 11, the Philippine adaptation of the Dutch reality competition series Big Brother, where she was dubbed as "Ang Anakabogerang Influencer ng Mandaluyong".

== Early life and education ==
Fyang was born May 13, 2006, and raised in Mandaluyong, Philippines to a Filipino mother and an American father who is a businessman. She attended José Rizal University and completed her senior high school at Lyceum Alabang in 2025.

== Career ==
At the age of 16, Fyang began creating content and quickly became well-known online for her fashion, lifestyle, and beauty-related posts. She joined Pinoy Big Brother: Gen 11 where she was hailed as the Big Winner on October 26, 2024, garnering a total of 30.66% of the votes.

Before joining PBB, Fyang was already an established social media influencer, with 5.9 million followers on TikTok and 1.5 million on Instagram.

Following her time on Big Brother, Fyang had her first appearance in the entertainment industry as a guest artist presenter on iWant ASAP, where she was featured all through November. On March 1, 2025, Fyang became the newest face of food company Mang Inasal's Extra Creamy Halo-Halo product.

== Controversy ==
In July 2025, Pokwang addressed a viral spliced video clip in which Pinoy Big Brother winner Fyang Smith remarked that her batch "cannot be beaten." In response, Pokwang offered advice via social media, urging Smith to remain humble and noting her own long-standing career in the entertainment industry.

Following her remarks, Pokwang alleged that some of Smith's fans targeted her 7-year-old daughter, Malia, with online harassment, including hurtful and threatening comments. She publicly stated her intention to pursue legal action against individuals involved in the attacks, citing the need to protect her child.

== Filmography ==
Key
| † | Denotes films that have not yet been released |

=== Film ===
| Year | Title | Role | Notes | Ref. |
|---|---|---|---|---|
| 2025 | My Love Will Make You Disappear | Larah | Special participation | |
| 2025 | Picnic | young Go Eun-sim | Filipino dubbed | |
| 2025 | Shake, Rattle & Roll: Evil Origins | DJ Elle | Main Role, MMFF 2025 entry | |
| 2026 | Almost Us | Janine | Lead Role | |
| 2026 | Haunted Carnival | TBA | Main Role, MMFF 2026 entry | |
| 2026 | The Greatest Showdown | TBA | Supporting Role, MMFF 2026 entry | |

=== TV Series ===
| Year | Title | Role | Notes | Ref. |
|---|---|---|---|---|
| 2025 | Ghosting | Jaja | Main Role | |
| 2026 | Love Is Never Gone | Raya Verona | Support Role | |

=== Microdrama ===
| Year | Title | Role | Notes | Ref. |
|---|---|---|---|---|
| 2026 | Will You Fake Marry Me? | June Sampaga | Lead Role | |

=== Variety & Live Shows ===
| Year | Title | Role | Notes | Ref. |
|---|---|---|---|---|
| 2024 | Pinoy Big Brother: Gen 11 | Herself | Housemate | |
| 2024–25 | Rainbow Rumble | Herself | Contestant | |
| 2025 | Pinoy Big Brother: Celebrity Collab Edition | Herself | Performer | |
| 2025 | Girly Pop Diaries | Jaja | | |

== Discography ==
=== Studio album ===
List of albums, with selected details
| Title | Album details |
|---|---|
| Forever Fyang | Released: June 20, 2025; Label: Star Music; Formats: Digital download, streaming |

== Awards and nominations ==
| Award (Note: Awards, festivals, honors and other miscellaneous organizations are listed in alphabetical order.) | Year (Note: Indicates the year of ceremony. Each year is linked to the article about the awards held that year, wherever possible.) | Category | Nominated work | Result | Ref. |
|---|---|---|---|---|---|
| PMPC Star Awards for Television | 2025 | Best New Female TV Personality | Herself | Won | |
| VP Choice Awards | 2025 | Promising Female Star of the Year | Herself | Won | |
| VP Choice Awards | 2025 | Fandom of the Year | Herself (with JM Ibarra) | Won | |
