= Klea Pineda =

Filipina actress and model (born 1999)

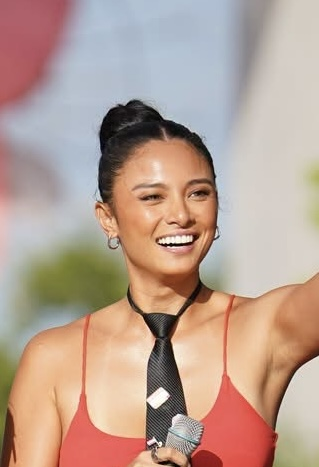
- Pineda in 2026
- Born: Klea Ching Pineda; March 19, 1999 (age 27); Caloocan, Philippines
- Occupations: Actress; model
- Years active: 2015–present
- Agent: Sparkle
- Known for: StarStruck; Ika-5 Utos; Magkaagaw; AraBella; Abot-Kamay na Pangarap; Open Endings

Klea Ching Pineda (born March 19, 1999) is a Filipino actress and model. She was the "Ultimate Female Survivor" (female winner) of the sixth season (2015) of the talent competition show StarStruck with Migo Adecer. Her most popular roles include Candy Buenaventura on Ika-5 Utos (2018–2019), Clarisse Santos-Almonte on Magkaagaw (2019–2021) and Gwen Abad on AraBella (2023).

== Early life and education ==
Klea Ching Pineda was born on March 19, 1999, in Caloocan, the eldest child of Charito (née Ching) and Rino Pineda. She attended junior high school at Sto. Nino de Novaliches School in Quezon City and graduated in 2016. She finished senior high school at Springfield International School in Quezon City. She took a pilot license course at Topflite Academy in Pasay.

== Personal life ==
Pineda previously dated actors Jak Roberto, Jeric Gonzales and Andre Paras.

In March 2023, Pineda came out as a lesbian and revealed her relationship with her girlfriend Katrice Kierulf to the public. On July 18, 2025, it was announced they have broken up.

As of 2026, Pineda is in a romantic relationship with fellow actress Janella Salvador.

Pineda has received lesbophobic remarks since coming out as a homosexual woman.

== Filmography ==
=== Film ===
Year	Title	Role
2019	Man and Wife	Teresa
2025	Open Endings	Kit
TBA	Cocaine Island	Chloe

=== Television ===
Year	Title	Role
2015	StarStruck (season 6)	Ultimate Female Survivor
2016	Maynila: Lovely Revenge	Kristel
2016	Magpakailanman: Zumba Dancing Boy: Balang	Danica "Nica" Domo
2016	Maynila: Back To Basics	Jammy
2016	Magpakailanman: Pikot In Love	Malou
2016	Encantadia	Muyak
2017	Meant to Be	Flo
2018	Wagas: The Lucky Charm: The Ace Capistrano & Jhoana Duran Love Story	Jhoana Duran
2018	The One That Got Away	Julie
2018	Sirkus	Sefira
2018–2019	Ika-5 Utos	Candy Buenaventura
2019–2021	Magkaagaw	Clarisse Santos-Almonte
2021	Stories from the Heart: Never Say Goodbye	Joyce Kintanar
2022	Bolera	Sheena "Golden Eye" Kim
2023	AraBella	Gwendolyn V. Abad
2023–2024	Abot-Kamay na Pangarap	Justine T. Refuerzo
2025	Lolong: Bayani ng Bayan	Malaya "Laya"
2025	It's Showtime	Herself
2025	Binibining Marikit	Atty. Pia Abad
2025	Sanggang-Dikit FR	Mori
2026	Taskforce Firewall	Raven
