= JM Ibarra =

Filipino actor

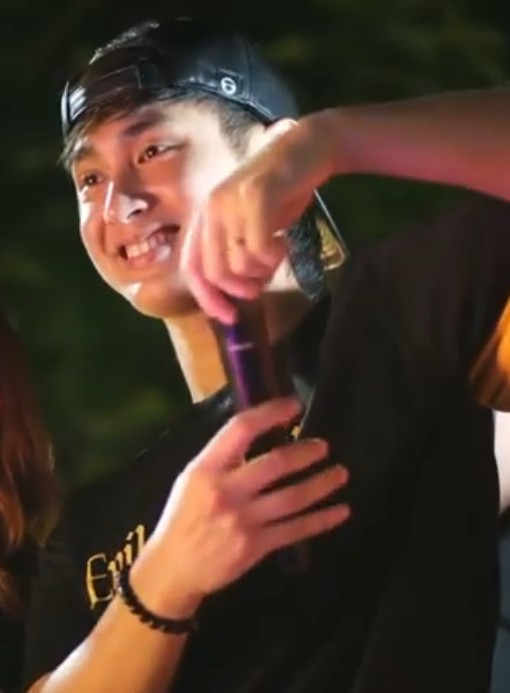
- Ibarra in 2025
- Born: John Mark Daniel Ibarra; August 16, 2000 (age 26); Mauban, Quezon, Philippines
- Occupation: Actor
- Years active: 2024–present
- Agent: Star Magic
- Known for: Pinoy Big Brother: Gen 11; Child No. 82
- Height: 1.73 m (5 ft 8 in)

John Mark "JM" Daniel Ibarra (born August 16, 2000) is a Filipino actor. He gained prominence in 2024 as a housemate on the reality television series Pinoy Big Brother: Gen 11, where he finished as a finalist. Following his exit from the show, he established an on-screen partnership with Fyang Smith, known as "JMFyang".

Ibarra transitioned into professional acting with a lead role in the digital series Ghosting (2025) and the Cinemalaya Philippine Independent Film Festival film Child No. 82 (2025). Critical response to his performance in Child No. 82 was positive, with the Daily Tribune describing it as "commendable". He appeared in the horror anthology Shake, Rattle & Roll Evil Origins and the film Picnic.

== Early life and education ==
John Mark Daniel Ibarra was born and raised in Mauban, Quezon. Before joining the entertainment industry, he was an aviation student with the goal of becoming a pilot. Ibarra has publicly discussed his personal struggles with his father, noting that he channeled these experiences into his performance for the film Child No. 82. He stated that he reconnected with his father following his eviction from the Pinoy Big Brother house.

== Career ==
In 2024, Ibarra competed in Pinoy Big Brother: Gen 11, where he finished in fifth place. During the show, he was introduced as "Ang Poginsyanong Pilo-ToBe ng Quezon". (Note: transl. The Handsome Provincial Pilot-to-be of Quezon) After the competition, he was paired with fellow housemate Fyang Smith in a love team known as "JMFyang".

In January 2025, Ibarra appeared in the music video for Regine Velasquez's song "Wherever You Are". He made a cameo appearance in the film My Love Will Make You Disappear. Later that year, he voiced a character in the Tagalog-dubbed version of the South Korean film Picnic, working alongside Smith, Nova Villa, and Ces Quesada. He also modeled for the clothing brand Bench during Bench Fashion Week Holiday 2025.

In July 2025, Ibarra starred in the digital series Ghosting, produced by IWantTFC. He portrayed Wilberto, a soldier from the 1940s, a role which required him to maintain a "stoic, composed presence". Ibarra stated that maintaining this demeanor was challenging due to the improvisational humor of his co-stars during filming. The series trailer gained over 12 million views.

Ibarra landed his first lead film role in Child No. 82: Anak ni Boy Kana (transl. Child No. 82: Boy Kana's Son), directed by Tim Rone Villanueva. The film was an entry in the 21st Cinemalaya Philippine Independent Film Festival in October 2025. Ibarra played Max, a teenager who claims to be the illegitimate son of a deceased action star, played by Vhong Navarro. Ibarra stated that he used the Meisner technique to prepare for the role. The film tackles social issues such as "nepo babies" and illegitimate children. Stephanie Mayo of the Daily Tribune gave the film 2.5 out of 5 stars, calling it "middling" but describing Ibarra's performance as "commendable".

A sequel to his digital series, titled Ghosting Part 2, was released in November 2025. In the sequel, Ibarra portrayed Macmac, a photographer who resembles his previous character Wilberto. A spin-off series, Girly Pop Diaries, was also released to provide backstory for the characters.

Ibarra was cast in the horror anthology film Shake, Rattle & Roll: Evil Origins, an entry to the 2025 Metro Manila Film Festival. He played the character James, a college student and victim of bullying who enjoys video games. The film was released on December 25, 2025.

When asked about future roles, Ibarra stated he is not comfortable performing in the Boys' Love (BL) genre and expressed a desire to be known as a "serious artist" rather than just a "leading man".

== Personal life ==
In May 2025, Ibarra received death threats on social media from an account associated with the fan of a rival love team, claiming a hitman had been hired to target him. His management agency, Star Magic, condemned the threats and warned of legal action.

== Filmography ==
=== Film ===
Year	Title	Role	Notes	Ref.
2025	My Love Will Make You Disappear	Mico "Tim"	Cameo	
2025	Child No. 82	Max	Lead role; Cinemalaya entry	
2025	Picnic	N/A	Tagalog voice dub	
2025	Shake, Rattle & Roll: Evil Origins	James	2025 Metro Manila Film Festival entry	
2026	Almost Us	RR	Main role	

=== Television and digital ===
Year	Title	Role	Ref.
2024	Pinoy Big Brother: Gen 11	Himself	
2025	Ghosting	Wilberto / Macmac	
2025	Girly Pop Diaries	Treb / MacMac	
2026	Love Is Never Gone	Ronnie Manalang	

=== Microdrama ===
Year	Title	Role	Ref.
2026	Will You Fake Marry Me?	Ping Nabong	

=== Music video appearance ===
Year	Song	Artist	Ref.
2025	"Wherever You Are"	Regine Velasquez	
