= Pinoy Big Brother: Gen 11 =

Philippine television reality show

- Season 11
- Title card
- Hosted by: Bianca Gonzalez; Robi Domingo; Kim Chiu; Melai Cantiveros; Enchong Dee; Alexa Ilacad
- No. of days: 99
- No. of housemates: 18
- Winner: Fyang Smith
- Runner-up: Rain Celmar
- Companion show: PBB Gen11 Up
- No. of episodes: 100

Release
- Original network: Kapamilya Channel (Note: The show also aired on A2Z, Kapamilya Online Live, TV5, and TFC. It was also streamed on-demand via iWantTFC.)
- Original release: July 20 – October 26, 2024

Season chronology
- ← Previous; Kumunity Season 10 Next → Collab 3.0

External videos
- Pinoy Big Brother Gen 11 — Full Episodes
- Pinoy Big Brother Gen 11 Big 4ever — Full Episodes

The eleventh season of the reality show, Pinoy Big Brother, subtitled Gen 11 (short for Generation 11), aired on Kapamilya Channel and A2Z for 99 days from July 20 to October 26, 2024.

This was the seventh consecutive season in which both civilian adults and teenagers participated in a season, using a similar format of both All In and Connect seasons to house them together as a single batch. This is also the first season in the entire series to feature all-female finalists, and the third season to be dominated by teen housemates, following the Lucky 7 and Connect seasons. This season is tied with Connect as the shortest special season produced by the series to date. Following the series’ transfer to TV5 during the final week of Connect, it became the first and, to date, only special season to have been broadcast entirely on the network.

Fyang Smith emerged as the winner of the season against runner-up Rain Celmar, while Kolette Madelo and Kai Montinola finished in third and fourth place, respectively. Smith became the latest late-entrant housemate in a special season to win the season, following Daniel Matsunaga of All In, and Liofer Pinatacan of Connect. She was also the third and latest teen housemate to win in a special season and the seventh teen overall to win in the series, following Maymay Entrata of Lucky 7 and Jimboy Martin of 737.

== Development ==
A new season of Pinoy Big Brother was confirmed on December 13, 2023, during the ABS-CBN Christmas Special that presented the network's program line-up for 2024. The season, the first to air in two years, is subtitled Gen 11, emphasizing the season's focus on housemates from Generation Z. ABS-CBN Television Production Head Unit and Head Director Laurenti Dyogi initially confirmed that the season would premiere in June. However, the season's premiere date moved to July 20.

=== Auditions ===
Cities in the Philippines where the auditions for the eleventh season of Pinoy Big Brother were held.

On April 6, Dyogi announced that Star Hunt will oversee the casting process for the upcoming season along with auditions for Star Magic and aspiring Star Hunt Academy trainees, beginning with on-ground auditions in Metro Manila, and then in Luzon, Visayas, and Mindanao in the following weeks. Auditions were also held abroad ahead of the season's announcement.

Auditions for Gen 11 officially began on April 27 and marked the return of physical auditions after it was halted in response to the COVID-19 pandemic in the Philippines during the past two seasons. Like in previous seasons, the auditions for adult and teen housemates (ages 16–32) were held simultaneously. Online auditions began on May 29, and ended on June 16, 2024. A total of 35,906 auditioned for this season, with 20,157 coming from on-site auditions via Star Hunt and 15,749 coming through online auditions. Among them, 67 were selected for the final casting.

On-ground auditions of Pinoy Big Brother: Gen 11
Date	Location	Venue
September 1, 2023	Sacramento, California, U.S.	Memorial Auditorium
April 27, 2024	Quezon City	Robinsons Novaliches
April 28, 2024	Las Piñas	Robinsons Las Piñas
May 4 and 5, 2024	General Santos	KCC Mall of GenSan
May 11 and 12, 2024	Quezon City	Robinsons Galleria
May 18 and 19, 2024	Naga, Camarines Sur	Robinsons Naga
May 25 and 26, 2024	Mandaue, Cebu	Pacific Mall Mandaue

==== False casting calls ====
In April 2024, netizens reported unauthorized audition calls that falsely claimed to be open casting calls for ABS-CBN shows such as Pinoy Big Brother, FPJ's Batang Quiapo, and Senior High's sequel, High Street, that were widely circulated on social media. In response, ABS-CBN issued an advisory on April 16, 2024, to debunk the misleading casting calls and advise the public to be vigilant against scammers falsely representing themselves as part of the show's production.

=== Timeslot ===
The show airs at 10:15 p.m. (PST) every weeknights after Pamilya Sagrado, 8:30 p.m. (Kapamilya Channel, Kapamilya Online Live, A2Z and TV5) on Saturdays, and at 8:30 p.m. (Kapamilya Channel, Kapamilya Online Live and A2Z) and 9:30 p.m. (TV5) on Sundays after Rainbow Rumble.

This season, a daily 30-minute highlights show aired on Monday through Friday, with a one-hour live eviction show on Saturday and nominations show revealed on Sunday.

== Overview ==
=== Logo ===
The logo for Pinoy Big Brother: Gen 11 features significant changes from the logos used in past seasons. The logo's eye is identical to that used on the tenth season, which features gradients inspired by the colors of the Philippine flag, but slants rightward. The text Pinoy Big Brother also slants rightward and has a gradient spanning shades of blue and red. The season's subtitle Gen 11 is featured below with a white neon color. Below the text is an outline of a house in neon light.

=== House ===
The house's façade was repainted in yellow and blue, and four LED screens were installed on the windows; the other façade (also known as House B in Double Up including the activity area) was demolished in May 2023 due to the expiration of its lease. The interior of the house has been updated, repainted, and furnished with a video-game theme. Mural paintings by Polido Mural Arts adorn the walls. The living area prominently displays a large version of the current graphical eye's logo, along with pixelated art of José Rizal, the GomBurZa, and Melchora Aquino. The translated lyrics of the show's theme song are also displayed in various Filipino languages. In the pool area, a mural featuring the lyric "Oh Shux!" from the 2023 song "Pantropiko" by the P-pop girl group Bini, along with pixelated clouds and trees, adds to the theme. The confession room has been repainted and renovated, now featuring sofa "blocks."

=== Hosts ===
Bianca Gonzalez, Robi Domingo, Kim Chiu, Melai Cantiveros, and Enchong Dee, collectively known as Pamilya ni Kuya (lit. 'Big Brother's family'), reprised their roles as the main hosts of the season. This is the first full season without Toni Gonzaga as the main host since the inception of the Philippine franchise in 2005. On June 20, 2024, former Kumunity 10 celebrity housemate Alexa Ilacad was named one of the presenters for the season and its digital companion shows.

=== Livestream ===
Every day from 8:00 a.m. until 12:00 a.m., viewers can watch the show live on the e-commerce app Lazada through LazLive. There are four distinct live streams available for viewers to choose from: the main stream, which will showcase the entire house, the dining area, the living room, and the pool area.

=== Sponsorships ===
The show has partnered with the following products and services: mobile payment app Maya, which serves as the season's official finance and voting partner; Unilever beauty products Cream Silk and Pond's; soft drink brand Coca-Cola; and e-commerce app Lazada, which serves as the official e-commerce and shopping application and also provides the show's livestream via the Lazada app. All these products have product placements inside the house.

=== Companion shows ===
This season has a digital companion show called PBB Gen 11 Up, hosted by Alexa Ilacad, Enchong Dee, Melai Cantiveros, Kim Chiu and Robi Domingo and airs every Saturday at 8:30 p.m. to 9:30 p.m. and can be viewed on Kapamilya Online Live via Facebook and YouTube.

=== Theme songs ===
This season's theme song is a remix of the original theme song "Pinoy Ako" by the band Orange and Lemons, modified to match the season's theme, reverting back from the newer "Pinoy Tayo" by Rico Blanco used in the previous season. Meanwhile, the eviction theme song is "Huwag Muna Tayong Umuwi" (lit. 'let's not go home yet') by Bini, from their sophomore album Feel Good (2022).

=== Prizes ===
The winner received ₱1,000,000, and a house and lot from Vista Land. Meanwhile, the second, third, and fourth "big placers" received ₱500,000, ₱300,000, and ₱200,000, respectively. All finalists also received an all-expense paid trip to South Korea for two from Mitzy Travel & Tours worth ₱200,000, and a three-month endorsement contract with Lazada as "LazAffiliate Ambassadors" worth ₱400,000.

== Format ==
Every week, each housemate must nominate two other housemates for eviction, with the first receiving two points and the second receiving one. The top three (or more if there is a tie) housemates with the most nomination points will be put forward for public vote. Furthermore, Big Brother has the authority to grant immunity or an automatic nomination to a housemate, primarily due to twists or violations. A nomination round may be paused due to pending tasks, challenges, or twists.

=== Twists ===
- Partnership with Maya: Maya has partnered with Pinoy Big Brother to serve as the season's official finance and voting partner, with the following twists inserted into the season:
  - Save or Spend Weekly Task: In the event that the housemates win their weekly task beginning in Week 2, they will be able to manage their weekly budget, which will be deposited through Maya. If they succeed in their weekly task, they will receive ₱15,000. Housemates have two options: they can spend a portion of their weekly budget for the week or save it and watch it grow with an interest rate of up to 15% (potentially growing to ₱200,000).
  - Vote to Save-Evict: This season, voting will be done entirely through the Maya app, as opposed to the two platforms (Kumu and text voting) that were used in the previous seasons, namely Connect and Kumunity 10. To vote, viewers must first create a Maya account, verify their account, and have enough funds to vote. Viewers can cast 10, 50, or 110 votes (one peso = one vote for 10 and 50 votes, or ₱100 for 110 votes) to save or evict a housemate of their choice from eviction. Viewers have only 15 chances to vote each day, which will be reset at midnight. This method was eventually discontinued after the seventh eviction round due to widespread and violent use of the vote-to-evict against several housemates, and it was replaced solely by the vote-to-save beginning with the eighth nomination round.
  - Unlimited Voting: Carried over from the previous season, unlimited voting was re-introduced as a twist during the open voting held on Day 86 to determine the Big 4 up to the Big Night again to determine the season's winner. Unlike the usual 15-votes-per-user-per-day limit in previous eviction rounds, viewers could now vote as many times as they wished during the open voting period and the finale.
- Two-in-one housemates: This season featured two sets of two-in-one housemates. This is the third season to feature more than one two-in-one housemates compete after the second celebrity season and Double Up.
  - On Day 1, Dingdong Bahan and Patrick Ramirez, who are a couple, were introduced as two-in-one housemates. As part of a challenge, Big Brother only allowed one of them to enter the house on launch night. During their first week together, they were assigned different tasks and told to keep their relationship a secret until later. They accomplished this and were able to keep their status as a two-in-one housemate.
  - On Day 34, Joli Alferez and Gwen Montano, who had previously been considered separate housemates and entered the house on Days 24 and 33, were turned into a two-in-one housemate by Big Brother due to their "situationship" in the outside world. Both completed separate tasks to become official housemates, eventually becoming the next set of two-in-one housemates competing.
- Eleven "official housemate" slots: On Day 1, Big Brother revealed to the housemates that they were only referred to as "houseguests," but in reality, they are all housemates. Big Brother then revealed eleven "official housemate" positions for the "houseguests" to fill throughout the week. Three voting rounds were held to determine the "housemates," and those who were not chosen were at risk of being included on the list of nominees for the first eviction. This challenge put the housemates' integrity with one another, as well as their commitment and willingness to stay in the house, to the test.
- Intruders: More housemates entered the house in the coming weeks, beginning on Day 16.
  - Two In, Two Out: On the second and third evictions, two housemates were evicted at the same time, while two new housemates entered and took their places after the eviction.
- Big Brother's Gameroom and the new eviction process: Instead of the usual announcements in the living area, this season's eviction callout will be a head-to-head, with two nominated housemates entering Big Brother's Gameroom and Bianca announcing the results. In the event that there are even-numbered or more than three nominees, the first safe will be named in the living area before the two nominees are determined, after which they will proceed to the Gameroom, where one will be saved and will return to the house and the other will be evicted. Still, each week, the nominees will be announced in the living area.
- Teens vs. Adults: On Week 8, the teens and adults were divided into separate groups. While the nominees remained undisclosed to the housemates, the public was informed on Day 53, with voting continuing as usual. The housemates received clues in the living area, leading them to a box containing a list of nominees sealed in an envelope. Both groups faced challenges designed to test their camaraderie, and members were not allowed to communicate with one another until further notice.
- LigTask Challenge: Initial nominees compete in a challenge for a chance to save themselves from being up for eviction.
- House Challengers: Evicted housemates returned to the house as "house challengers" to create conflict and chaos, serving as a test for the remaining housemates while also helping the public decide who deserves a spot in the Big Four. The house challengers included Therese Villamor, former two-in-one housemates Dingdong Bahan and Patrick Ramirez, Jas Dudley-Scales, and Jarren Garcia, who was evicted on Day 71 after receiving the fewest public votes during the 9th eviction night. Big Brother then offered Jarren the challenge of becoming a house challenger, which he immediately accepted.
  - House Challenges: The housemates and house challengers faced a series of challenges that may or may not have an impact on who stays and who leaves the house, and those housemates who faced the challenges risked losing their housemate status to them.
- Rank-Based Nominations: In Week 12, the six remaining housemates ranked themselves from the most deserving to the least deserving to be the season's Big Winner, with the most deserving receiving one point and the least deserving receiving six points. This twist was last used in the Connect season.
- The Big Payanig (The Big Shake-up): On Day 78, Big Brother revealed three major twists that will take place inside the house to put the remaining housemates to the test as the finale approaches.
  - The Big Lie: A mental twist which tests the housemates by bridging the lines between reality and deceit, putting their understanding of truth into question.
  - The Big Love: A emotional twist that examines the housemates' feelings and pushes their hearts to their boundaries.
  - The Big Task: The ultimate twist to help viewers select the one who deserves the title of Big Winner.
- Madam, Big Brother's AI Assistant: On Day 94, Big Brother introduced "Madam," an artificial intelligence assistant whose official role was to "assist Big Brother with his daily tasks." However, Madam's true purpose was to sabotage the housemates by revealing their true personalities. This was part of the "Big Task" twist within the broader "Big Payanig" twist.

== Housemates ==
Leading up to the series premiere, five people were introduced daily from July 15 to 19, 2024, on Star Hunt: The Audition Show. Fourteen housemates entered the house on launch night (July 20), including two-in-one housemates Dingdong Bahan and Patrick Ramirez. Five additional housemates moved in over the next few weeks: Jan Silva and Fyang Smith on Day 16 (August 4); Joli Alferez and JP Cabrera on Day 24 (August 12), and Gwen Montano on Day 33 (August 21). Montano and Alferez were later merged as a single housemate on Day 34 (August 22), becoming the next two-in-one housemates after Bahan and Ramirez.

A total of twenty people entered the house, with sixteen competing as individuals and four as pairs, which counted as two two-in-one housemates. This brings the housemate count to eighteen.

List of Pinoy Big Brother: Gen 11 Housemates
Name	Age on Entry	Hometown	Type	Day entered	Day exited	Status	Ref.
Fyang	18	Mandaluyong	Teen	Day 16	Day 99	Winner	
Rain Celmar	17	Cebu	Teen	Day 1	Day 99	Runner-up	
Kolette Madelo	20	General Santos	Adult	Day 1	Day 99	3rd Place	
Kai Montinola	17	Cebu	Teen	Day 1	Day 99	4th Place	
JM Ibarra	23	Quezon	Adult	Day 1	Day 92	Evicted	
JP Cabrera	18	Quezon City	Teen	Day 24	Day 85	Evicted	
Binsoy Namoca	22	South Cotabato	Adult	Day 1	Day 78	Evicted	
Jarren Garcia	17	London, UK	Teen	Day 1	Day 71	Evicted	
Jas Dudley-Scales	24	Negros Oriental	Adult	Day 1	Day 64	Evicted	
Dylan Yturralde	21	Pampanga	Adult	Day 1	Day 57	Evicted	
Gwen Montano & Joli Alferez	24	Cavite (Montano), Camarines Sur (Alferez)	Adult	Day 33; Day 24	Day 50	Evicted	
Jan Silva	18	Cebu	Teen	Day 16	Day 43	Evicted	
Dingdong Bahan & Patrick Ramirez	27 & 26	Taguig (Bahan), Manila (Ramirez)	Adult	Day 1	Day 36	Evicted	
Noimie Steikunas	31	Lithuania	Adult	Day 1	Day 29	Evicted	
Brx Ruiz	32	Bacolod	Adult	Day 1	Day 29	Evicted	
Kanata Tapia	16	Occidental Mindoro	Teen	Day 1	Day 22	Evicted	
Marc Nanninga Jr.	17	Camarines Norte	Teen	Day 1	Day 22	Evicted	
Therese Villamor	17	Camarines Sur	Teen	Day 1	Day 15	Evicted	

== Houseguests ==
Big Brother may invite guests, physically or virtually, to his house for special occasions.

- Day 9: Jocelyn Tampon, Kolette's biological mother, entered the house to see her daughter, who had not seen her since she was four months old.
- Day 34: Flora Mae Montinola, Kai's foster mother, came inside to see her foster child and to allay Kai's longing worries about her biological parents. Kai's foster mother found her "biological parents" in Cebu, and Big Brother consented for them to both take a DNA test to find out.
- Day 36: Alyssa Valdez, former Kumunity 10 celebrity housemate and volleyball player, appeared virtually and left a video message for the housemates to motivate them for their Team to Beat weekly task.
- Days 38–40: Melai Cantiveros, the show's host and former Double Up housemate and winner, entered the house to serve as the casting director for the BisTag ang Pinoy: The Musical weekly task. Melai assigned tasks to the housemates as a warm-up prior to being appointed cast director. Her entry into the house also served as a promotion for her talk show, Kuan on One.
- Day 43: Vimi Rivera and Gela Atayde, dance coaches, entered the house to train the housemates in dance for their BisTag ang Pinoy: The Musical weekly task.
- Days 47–48: Flora Mae Montinola, Kai's foster mother, returned to the house to learn the results of Kai's DNA test that identified her biological parents, which were positive. She later joined Kai's biological mother, Jean, for dinner.
- Day 48: Jean Bas, Kai's biological mother, entered the house to meet her for the first time. She, Flora Mae, and Kai ate dinner in the living area.
- Day 49: Mel Cabrera, JP's mother, appeared virtually to leave a message for JP as a challenge in their Oh Hey! Si Nonchalant weekly task.
- Days 49–50: Jhoann Garcia, Jarren's mother, entered the house to see Jarren as a challenge in their Oh Hey! Si Nonchalant weekly task.
- Day 50: Joshua Garcia, former All In housemate and actor, entered the house to promote his film, Un/Happy for You. Joshua and the housemates took part in some acting challenges based on lines from the film.
- Day 58: Ninth evictee Dylan Yturralde, appeared virtually to deliver a video message to the teen housemates a day after his eviction.
- Day 61: Myrna Smith, Fyang's mother, and Marilyn Dudley-Scales, Jas's mother, entered the house to guide and observe Fyang and Jas as they officially reconciled after their controversial and heated Rap Battle challenge. They also gave letters to both of them and secretly watched their conversation from the task room.
- Day 82: Several houseguests entered the house to visit the remaining housemates and reveal the outcomes of their Big Lie challenges.
  - Mel Cabrera, JP's mother, came to see JP and announce the result of his Big Lie challenge.
  - Raul Celmar, Rain's father, also visited to see Rain and announce the result of her Big Lie challenge.
- Days 86–91: Several houseguests entered the house to visit the remaining housemates and reveal the outcomes of their Big Love challenges: Kennett Montinola (Kai's foster father), Flora Mae Montinola (Kai's foster mother), (Note: Flora did not participate in the Big Love challenge; she merely visited Kai to accompany her and Kennett during Kai's "Big Hour.") Nanette Oca (Kolette's adopted mother), Hayden Smith (Fyang’s brother), Lander Ibarra (JM's brother), Jenn Celmar (Rain's mother), Estrella Ibarra (JM's mother), and Ronald Madelo (Kolette's father).

== Tasks ==
=== Weekly tasks ===
Big Brother will assign weekly tasks to the housemates each week to test their group dynamics, cooperation, and camaraderie. Beginning with the second weekly task, the housemates who successfully finish their weekly task will receive ₱15,000 as their budget through Maya. From there, they can choose to either spend their weekly budget or save it and watch it grow through the Save or Spend Weekly Task twist, which offers an interest rate of up to 15% (growing up to ₱200,000).

Task No.	Date & day assigned	Task description	Result
1	**July 24** (Day 5)	**Pasa-Pasa para sa Labing-Isa (Passing for Eleven)**; The housemates and houseguests must collect water from the pool with eleven objects, moving 11 to 11.99 liters of water in 11 to 11 minutes and 59 seconds into a container. They are strictly required to pass the water with their respective objects while standing on the eleven platforms provided. Big Brother provided five objects: a boot, basin, water gallon, sponge, and a spoon. The housemates and houseguests will decide on the remaining six objects. (Note: The task's success is determined by the ratio of water placed in the container to the time taken. If both the housemates and "houseguests" pass this task, they will not only secure their weekly budget but also all become "official housemates." Otherwise, the remaining four "houseguests" (Brx, Dingdong, Dylan, and Kolette) will be punished.)	Failed (Note: After four trials—three successful and one failed—the fifth trial will be the final judge. In the fifth trial, the ratio was unequal: they distributed 12.39 liters in 10 minutes and 29 seconds, exceeding the maximum limit of 11.99 liters by 0.4 liters. Consequently, the housemates and houseguests failed the task. Despite revealing that the "official housemate" twist was just a test, one of the four "houseguests" will be nominated for the first nomination night.)
2	**July 31** (Day 12)	**Pinoy Big Babies' Requests**; The parents of the Pinoy Big Babies, namely Brx, Binsoy, Jas, and Noimie, must have to guess and do at least 6 out of 11 requests of the eleven babies during the duration of the weekly task. (Note: See the other task named "Pinoy Big Babies - Part 1" (number 5) for the full context of this task. Big Brother would give the parents a time limit to guess what the babies wanted. They were only supposed to complete each request once; if they guess incorrectly, they will not have another opportunity to fulfill the baby's request.) List of the babies' requests: "Baby" housemate / Request / Status; Dylan / Make baby Dylan laugh over a simple joke. / Passed; Jarren / Cook and eat Filipino-style spaghetti. / Passed; JM / Iron a uniform that must be worn by baby JM. / Passed; Kolette / Prepare snacks for "school". / Passed; Marc / Teach baby Marc how to write his name. / Failed; Rain / A hug from her parents, Brx and Noimie. / Passed; Therese / To be kissed by Noimie on both cheeks while she wears a red lipstick. (Note: If Noimie fulfills Baby Therese's request, she will have the opportunity to meet her child via video message.) / Passed; Final score / / 6/11 (Note: The requests of the remaining babies, Kai, Kanata, Patrick, and Rain, were not revealed because the housemates had met their goal of six successful requests following Baby Dylan's requests.)	Passed
3	**August 5** (Day 17)	**Likes, Camera, Upload!** The housemates were assigned the task of creating three videos with a "good vibe" theme to be posted online. They were divided into two groups, with Dingdong and Rain leading each group. The first and second videos, which feature different groups, must be at least three minutes long, while the third video, which features all of the housemates, must be no less than six minutes long. To win, each uploaded video must receive at least 111,111 likes and reactions from the public on the show's official social media pages. (Note: The videos were shared on the show's official Facebook, TikTok, and YouTube pages. Dingdong and Patrick, the two-for-one housemates, were counted separately for this task. Team Rain's video was posted following the August 6 episode, while Team Dingdong's video was posted the next day, August 7. The third video, which included all of the housemates, was released on Thursday, August 8. The deadline for counting likes and reactions was on Friday, August 9, at 7:00 p.m. The weekly task's results were announced on Sunday, August 11.) Groups: Team Dingdong: Dingdong (leader), Brx, Dylan, Jan, Jas, Kolette, Noimie, Patrick; Team Rain: Rain (leader), Binsoy, Fyang, Jarren, JM, Kai, Kanata, Marc; Final result: "Pinoy Big High School Team" Team Dingdong / "C U Happy" Team Rain / "Vibe Day Weekday" All housemates; **106,151** (95.54%) / **189,786** (170.81%) / **96,606** (86.95%)	Failed
4	**August 12** (Day 24)	**Relay ang Ship (Relay the Ship) — Part 1** On Day 24, two new housemates, Joli and JP entered the house and were immediately given a secret task. They were given two "paper ships"; Joli chose one of the two colored papers with the tasks written on it. They must behave in a specific manner based on the information in the paper; they can either act as best friends who stayed together but abruptly separated in the air without explanation, or as identical siblings who appear to be the same but are not. They must ensure that the other housemates are unaware that they are not related and are in fact separate housemates, and they must complete this task successfully to avoid losing half of their weekly budget for the next week.	Failed
4	**August 15** (Day 27) (Note: Brx and Noimie were in the house when the task was performed. The results of this task were aired on August 18 (Day 30), one day after the third eviction night.)	**Relay ang Ship (Relay the Ship) — Part 2** The housemates were tasked to construct a ship using bamboo and additional supplies that Big Brother had provided. The ship can only be built and maintained by a single pair at a time. Each pair has to take the ship from one end of the pool to the other and back in 30 minutes at the end of the week. (Note: See the other task named "Partnerships" (number 9) for the context of this weekly task.)	Passed
5	**August 23** (Day 35) (Note: Dingdong & Patrick were in the house when the task was performed. The result of this task was aired on August 25 (Day 37), one day after the fourth eviction night.)	**Team to Beat**; The housemates were split up into two groups and had to play basketball and volleyball; tryouts were held to decide which housemate would play in which group. For this task, each team has one hour to score as many points as they can. In basketball, each player in that group needs to be able to shoot in succession in accordance with their assigned numbers and spots on the court. To score a point, the shooter needs to successfully hit the ball into the ring. In volleyball, each member of that group must pass or "volley" in accordance with their assigned numbers and spots, and a point is scored when the spiker successfully spikes the ball at the end of the pool. A twist was added: in order to win, each team's members had to switch groups (except for the team leaders) and beat their previous game's point total (19 for volleyball and 20 for basketball). (Note: If a team successfully beats their previous high score, they will receive 50% of the weekly budget.) Team to Beat weekly task scoreboard: / Basketball Team / Volleyball Team / Total score; Scores to beat (pre-swap) / 20 pts. / 19 pts. / **39 pts.**; Final score (post-swap) / 9 pts. / 20 pts. / **29 pts.**; Final result / Failed / Passed / Partial (50% of the weekly budget); Groups (pre-swap): **Team Basketball**: Jan (captain), Binsoy, Gwen, JM, Joli, JP, and Kai; **Team Volleyball**: Dylan (captain), Dingdong, Fyang, Jarren, Jas, Kolette, Patrick, and Rain	Passed
6	**August 26** (Day 38) (Note: Jan was in the house when the task was performed. The musical and the result of this task was aired on September 1 (Day 44), one day after the fifth eviction night.)	**BisTag ang Pinoy: The Musical** (Note: English: BisTag are Filipinos (BisTag is the portmanteau of the Bisaya and Tagalog dialects.)); The housemates were tasked with creating an original Bisaya-Tagalog musical play, as well as performing six songs, including the Bisaya version of "Pinoy Ako," the Bisaya-Tagalog version of their original song "C U Happy," and two original Tagalog and Bisaya songs. They must perform the musical in two acts for fifty online audiences who speak both dialects. The judging criteria are divided into two parts: proper pronunciation of the two dialects and entertainment value. To win the task, they must get at least 80 out of 100 "approvals" from the audience. (Note: The full name of the musical is entitled "Gugmang Hindi Para Sayo" in Bisaya, "Pagmamahal na Hindi Para Sayo" in Tagalog, and "Love That's Not For You" in English. During the musical, Binsoy, Kolette, Jas, Kai, Rain, Jan, and Jarren had to sing and speak Tagalog, whereas Gwen, Joli, Dylan, JM, Fyang, and JP had to sing and speak Bisaya.) BisTag ang Pinoy: The Musical weekly task result: Act I / Act II / Total; 48/50 / 48/50 / **96/100**	Passed
7	**September 2** (Day 45) (Note: Gwen & Joli were in the house when the task was performed. The result of this task was aired on September 8 (Day 51), one day after the sixth eviction night.)	**Oh Hey! Si Nonchalant (Oh Hey! It's Nonchalant)**; The housemates were tasked to remain nonchalant (calm, relaxed, or showing no emotion) for the entire week whenever signaled by Big Brother, including during assigned tasks. To pass, they must not make more than five mistakes throughout the duration of the challenge. (Note: When the housemates hear the cue "Nonchalant On," they must sit in the nonchalant zone and stay there while waiting for or watching whatever Big Brother will give them via ninjas. Their nonchalant behavior will only end when they hear "Nonchalant Off." The housemates are allowed five mistakes, and if they exceed this limit, they will lose the weekly task. The housemates were put through a variety of exercises, including being made to eat "ampalaya," a bitter melon, and resisting the urge to show emotion toward JP and Jarren's parents' respective physical and virtual appearances.)	Failed (Note: The other housemates had already committed four mistakes before JP was assigned his secret task of making them laugh until they cried. However, after JP was successful in making three of them cry, the number of mistakes was reduced to one. The housemates failed the weekly task, though, as they committed four more errors after completing the task.)
8	**September 11** (Day 54) (Note: Dylan was in the house when the task was performed. The result of this task was aired on September 15 (Day 58), one day after the seventh eviction night.)	**Two Towers**; The housemates in each of the two groups must construct a tower out of paper cups without using their arms or hands. Each of the two towers represents half of their weekly budget, and to receive it, each tower must be at least five feet tall. In addition, the group with the highest height after the task will be granted immunity and will be exempt from nominations.	Passed (Note: At the end of the weekly task, the teens successfully attempted to destroy the adults' tower, earning them half of the weekly budget for the following week. See the Group challenges section for more information.)
9	**September 16** (Day 59)	**Tuloy Tulay (Continuous Bridge)**; The housemates in each group will have constructed a portion of a bridge that is compatible and connected for the other housemates to cross by the end of the week. The housemates must ensure that the design, when viewed from above, replicates the shape of the house in addition to durability. To help them with this, they will refer to the pool area's blueprint. They will come together once they complete this weekly task successfully. (Note: The teens and adults take turns crossing one at a time, and everyone must complete the crossing in 11 minutes or less. When someone falls, they must return to the beginning of the bridge and follow the house's blueprint. As an added twist, at the end of the task, members from both groups must cross the bridge together.)	Passed
10	**September 23** (Day 66)	**K.K.K.: Kakampi, Kasama, Kaibigan (Ally, Companion, Friend)**; The housemates, working in pairs, were assigned to execute a trick shot of their choosing. Each pair will have eight hours to complete their shot, and for every successful trick shot, they will receive 25% of the weekly budget. Additionally, each pair will be awarded ₱10,000, which will be given to only one member of the pair. Pairs: Binsoy & Jarren, Kai & Rain, JP & Kolette, and Fyang & JM List of "K.K.K: Kakampi, Kasama, Kaibigan" trick shot challenges: Challenge No. / Date given / Trick shot challenge description / Final amount given / Result; 1 / **September 23** (Day 66) / **Trick Shot Challenge No. 2 — Golf Ping Pong**; Jarren and Binsoy must use a golf club to strike a ping pong ball that must be shot into a cup thrown onto a table by the other. / ₱8,000 (Note: Big Brother offered Jarren and Binsoy to throw the ball by hand for a deduction of ₱2,000. They had accepted this offer.) / Passed; 2 / **September 24** (Day 67) / **Trick Shot Challenge No. 3 — Hook Cup**; Kai and Rain must swing a hanging cup and transfer it into a hook, while the other simultaneously bounces a ping pong ball on two surfaces and aims to shoot it into the cup. / ₱10,000 (Note: Big Brother offered Kai and Rain the opportunity to increase their cup size in exchange for a ₱2,000 deduction, but they declined.) / Passed; 3 / **September 25** (Day 68) / **Trick Shot Challenge No. 1 — Rampa Kotse (Ramp Car)**; JP and Kolette must swing a roped hoop around a tied piece of wood while simultaneously timing the release of a toy race car, which had a hook, down a slide so that it would catch onto the hoop. / ₱10,000 / Passed; 4 / **September 26** (Day 69) / **Trick Shot Challenge No. 4 — Airplane Hanger**; Fyang and JM must swing a roped hoop around a tied piece of wood while simultaneously timing the release of a toy airplane, which had a hook, to throw so that it would catch onto the hoop. / ₱0 (Note: Big Brother offered Fyang and JM the opportunity to increase their hoop size in exchange for a ₱2,000 deduction, They had accepted this offer. Since, they failed the trick shot challenge, they will never received a cash reward.) / Failed; Final score / / / / 3/4	Passed (Note: At the end of the weekly task, the housemates successfully attempted three out of four trick shots, earning them 75% of the weekly budget for the following week. The housemates were agreed to spend ₱30,000 for JM's mother.)
11	**October 12** (Day 85)	**Tumba Table (Tippy Table)**; Carried over from the previous season's celebrity edition weekly task, the housemates were required to place a total of 111 blocks, with each block representing a nomination point received in previous nomination rounds, on an unstable hanging table. If a block fell or tumbled, either on or off the table, they had to restart from the beginning. Only one pair of housemates could place their blocks at a time. All blocks had to be positioned either vertically or horizontally and remain intact for eleven seconds. The task had to be completed within four hours. (Note: JM had to place 15 blocks, Kai had to place 20 blocks, Kolette had to place 26 blocks, JP had to place 7 blocks, Fyang had to place 31 blocks, and Rain had to place 12 blocks, resulting in a total of 111 blocks that all six housemates had to place for this weekly task.)	Failed (Note: The housemates had only lost half of their weekly budget for this task, as they successfully claimed the other half during their Stick-Lipat challenge against the house challengers on Day 78.)

=== Other tasks ===
In addition to the weekly tasks, Big Brother has the authority to assign additional ones. These tasks are divided into four categories: daily, which are regular tasks that housemates can complete and assign to one another; secret, which require a housemate to complete the task in secret without informing the other housemates; reward, which can apply to the three types and must be completed by the assigned housemate(s) in order to receive the reward; and special, which are special tasks imposed by Big Brother or the housemates themselves with Big Brother's approval. Punishment tasks are also listed here for transparency, and they are considered separately from the four types.

Depending on the outcome, some tasks may have the potential to influence the activities inside the House, to much extent the competition between the housemates. In some cases, the show's sponsors may sponsor specific tasks, and the housemates can receive luxury rewards through a luxury competition, task, or challenge.

Task No.	Date & day assigned	Task type	Task description	Participant(s)	Result
1	**July 20** (Day 1)	Special	On launch night, after the housemates noticed eleven platforms in the pool area, Big Brother greeted them and announced that they were not housemates, but rather houseguests. They were assigned a special task to become one of the eleven "official housemates" and entice the other housemates to do the same in a meaningful way. They were given an hour to complete this task. In reality, they were all housemates. This was a test to determine their commitment and willingness to stay inside the house.	All housemates	Passed
2	**July 20** (Day 1)	Secret	On Day 1, Big Brother assigned Dingdong and Patrick a series of secret tasks to keep their relationship hidden until further notice. At the live launch, they were told that only one of them could enter; Patrick chose to enter the house. First, Big Brother gave Patrick the key and a letter to open the pool area. Then, Big Brother tasked Patrick with becoming a "official housemate" on their special task so that his partner Dingdong could enter the house.	Dingdong and Patrick	Passed
3	**July 23** (Day 4)	Secret	On Day 4, Big Brother informed Dingdong that Patrick had successfully completed his secret task of becoming one of the first three "official housemates," so he was allowed to enter the house; however, the two had to keep their relationship hidden from the other housemates. Big Brother then asked Dingdong to enter the house as a "houseguest" and become one of the eleven "official housemates" by wearing a different nameplate to conceal his relationship with Patrick. Dingdong was assigned the name "Denn" for this secret task. (Note: Dingdong did not secure any of the eleven "official housemate" slots because he was unable to stand on the eleven "official housemate" platforms in time, and no housemate had given up their slots for Dingdong to become one. However, he was able to keep his relationship with Patrick hidden until Day 8, when it was time to reveal their true relationship.)	Dingdong	Failed
4	**July 29** (Day 10)	Special; Secret	On Day 10, Kai and Noimie were tasked with creating an adobo for Kolette so that she and her mother, Jocelyn, who had not seen her in years, could see each other for the first time. They were given the assistance of the other housemates except for Kolette, and the two were also tasked with making her sleep while performing the task. They must make sure that Kolette does not see her mother until the adobo is cooked, and that her mother brings the adobo to her.	Kai and Noimie	Passed
5	**July 30** (Day 11)	Daily	**Pinoy Big Babies — Part 1** On Day 11, the housemates were awakened by the sound of a crying baby. They were given the task of becoming "babies"; during the task, they will transform into babies every time they hear a baby cry, and they will only return to their original selves when they hear a baby laugh. They must wear bibs and communicate solely through action and baby words. Ten housemates became "babies," and four housemates were assigned as "parents" to care for them. This task was a reference to the midget skit Pinoy Big Babies created on Double Up. (Note: The "babies" were Dylan, Jarren, JM, Kai, Kanata, Kolette, Marc, Patrick, Rain, and Therese, while the "parents" were Brx, Noimie, Binsoy, and Jas. Binsoy and Jas looked after the "baby boys," while Brx and Noimie looked after the "baby girls." Dingdong has been excluded from participating in this task.)	All housemates except Dingdong	Passed
6	**July 30** (Day 11)	Daily	**Pinoy Big Babies — Part 2: Bet on Your Pinoy Big Baby**; The four parents, namely Binsoy, Brx, Jas, and Noimie were tasked with becoming the parents of ten babies and selecting their "favorite baby" of choice based on their observations. Binsoy and Jas chose Baby Dylan, while Brx and Noimie selected Baby Kanata. Big Brother then challenged the two "babies" to drink milk in the quickest time possible; the first to finish will return to their original selves. (Note: After the task, Baby Kanata was the first to finish her milk, effectively returning the female housemates to their original selves. However, the male housemates returned to their original selves following the task.)	All housemates except Dingdong	Passed
7	**July 31** (Day 12)	Special	On Day 12, Kanata was tasked with sending two messages to his father indicating that she had not been seen. She was tasked with creating a text and video message for his father, which Big Brother would then send.	Kanata	Passed
8	**August 4** (Day 16)	Daily	On Day 16, the two new housemates, Fyang and Jan, entered the house wearing an altered, funny face mask of themselves. They initially entered the house under aliases, Anne and Louie, and were required to speak in an altered voice. To become official housemates and remove the mask to reveal themselves, Fyang, Jan, and the other housemates must dance to a remix of the theme song while making funny faces (as demonstrated by Melai Cantiveros) during the dance.	All housemates	Passed
9	**August 14** (Day 26)	Daily	**Partnerships**; The housemates were divided into pairs, each consisting of a male and a female housemate. Using a colored tie, the boys must choose one girl partner to be with during the task—they are not allowed to be separated, even for tasks or other household chores. (Note: The pairs were Joli and JP, JM and Fyang, Jarren and Kolette, Dylan and Jas, Jan and Rain, Brx and Kai, Binsoy and Noimie, and Dingdong and Patrick. The selection was also based for their Relay ang Ship weekly task. The pairs were subjected to a variety of tasks while being tied together. Tasks include playing "Bring Me" in pairs and doing basic household chores while holding each other's shoulders. During the task, the housemates were given an additional task involving a cake as a luxury reward for Jan's birthday, in which they were required to complete challenges such as placing themselves away from each other and placing their cheeks to each other for an unlimited amount of time until Big Brother's signal.)	All housemates	Passed
10	**August 16** (Day 28)	Reward	**Compatibility Test**; On Day 28, while the housemates were working on their fourth weekly task, JM and Fyang were assigned a task in exchange for additional materials for their ship's construction. They must select three partners who will all be asked the same question; the answers of the chosen pairs must be identical. Those pairs who provide the same and correct answer will receive points, which will be converted into the equivalent of additional materials for their ship. In addition, they were also tasked with selecting a pair to host the game, and the hosts would play alongside the three playing pairs—Joli and JP.	Joli & JP, Dingdong & Patrick, Fyang & JM, Jas & Dylan	Passed
11	**August 17** (Day 29)	Special; Reward	On Day 29, just hours before the housemates performed their fourth weekly task, Fyang asked Big Brother for a birthday celebration for JM, including a simple dinner and a video greeting from his mother, in exchange for the housemates' success on that task.	Fyang and JM	Passed
12	**August 18** (Day 30)	Punishment	**Punishment Task — Part 1** On Day 30, Big Brother punished all of the housemates for constantly breaking the rules throughout their stay. As punishment, they were tasked with lifting the big rulebook until Big Brother's signal. They were not allowed to lower the big rulebook while performing the task.	All housemates	Passed
13	**August 18** (Day 30)	Punishment	**Punishment Task — Part 2** On that same day, Big Brother assigned the housemates a task: to determine which housemate had the "most number of violations," they were to rank themselves as rule breakers on a scale of one to fourteen, where one represented the highest number of violations and fourteen the lowest. Note that the housemates are not aware of each other's actual number of violations, so their ranking is based solely on their own perspectives. To determine the ranking, they were asked to lift and bring the large rulebook while receiving their number pins, which were placed around the pool area. The first seven housemates (ranked first through seventh) were "automatically nominated", while the remaining housemates were deemed safe and excluded from lifting the big rulebook following the announcement. Ranking of violations (both real and fake): Rank / Based on housemates' perspectives & fake list of nominees / Rank / Actual ranking & final list of nominees; 1 / JM / 1 / **Fyang & Rain**; 16 violations each; 2 / Fyang / 2 / **Fyang & Rain**; 16 violations each; 3 / Binsoy / 3 / **Kai & Kolette**; 14 violations each; 4 / Jan / 4 / **Kai & Kolette**; 14 violations each; 5 / Dingdong / 5 / **Dingdong & Patrick**; 13 violations; 6 / Patrick (Note: Patrick had to take the sixth spot automatically since Dingdong and Patrick are two-in-one housemates. This meant that the two-in-one were given an automatic nomination.) / 6 / **Dylan**; 11 violations; 7 / Kolette (Note: The recipient of the seventh position was determined by a house vote, and it was unanimously decided that Kolette should receive the seventh spot and an automatic nomination.) / 7 / **JM**; 10 violations; / / 8 / **Binsoy**; 9 violations; / / 9 / **Jarren**; 6 violations; / / 10 / **Jan**; 5 violations; / / 11 / **Jas**; 4 violations; / / 12 / **Joli**; 2 violations; / / 13 / **JP**; 1 violation	All housemates	Passed
14	**August 19** (Day 31)	Punishment	**Punishment Task — Part 3** The seven "nominated" housemates, Binsoy, Dingdong, Fyang, Jan, JM, Kolette, and Patrick, were tasked with lifting and bringing the big rulebook while walking in the pool area for 11 minutes, after which they would complete the entire punishment task.	Binsoy, Dingdong, Fyang, Jan, JM, Kolette, and Patrick	Passed
15	**August 20** (Day 32)	Secret	**HouseGuess — Part 1** On Day 32, Big Brother informed Binsoy that a new housemate, Gwen, would be entering the house with a "situationship" with another housemate, Joli. Binsoy does not yet know who the new housemate is, and has only been told that their identity is hidden in a box. To open the box containing Gwen's bathrobe, Binsoy must recruit two "allys" and Joli must brush their teeth (including Binsoy). He chose Jarren and JP to be his "allys".	Binsoy, Gwen, Jarren, and JP	Passed
16	**August 20** (Day 32)	Secret	**HouseGuess — Part 2** Binsoy, Jarren, and JP would have to work out with Gwen in a secret task where the three must speak Gwen's three mutual expressions: "boktir" (not true), "masiramon, boy" (delicious), and "ganda mo" (you're beautiful). Gwen can then enter the house, if they successfully complete this task.	Binsoy, Gwen, Jarren, and JP	Passed
17	**August 20** (Day 32)	Secret	**HouseGuess — Part 3** Binsoy, Jarren, and JP must persuade Joli to wear a blindfold and play a game in which she can guess the housemate just by touching it. If she correctly guesses the final housemate, who turns out to be her situationship partner Gwen, the latter will be able to remove his blindfold and become an official housemate, as well as complete the secret task.	Binsoy, Gwen, Jarren, and JP	Passed
18	**August 21** (Day 33)	Daily	On Day 33, after hearing a message notification tone throughout the house, Jarren and Rain were summoned to the confession room to learn more about Kai's longing for her biological parents. Big Brother had forwarded a message from Kai's parents to the two housemates, but it was jumbled. To learn more about Kai's biological parents, they had to rearrange and decipher the message. (Note: The deciphered message was: "Hi, Shing! How are you? Hope everything there is okay. May gusto akong ibalita. I have something to tell you: Anhaon tika diha love mama. (Hi, Shing! How are you? Hope everything there is okay. I want to tell you something. I'll see you there. Love, mom.) Note that "Shing" is Kai's nickname.)	Jarren and Rain	Passed
19	**August 25** (Day 37)	Daily	On Day 37, Binsoy and Kolette were tasked with creating a choreography for Kolette's original song, which Jarren would sing. As an example, they watched the dance of former 737 housemates Zeus Collins and Dawn Chang.	Binsoy and Kolette	Passed
20	**September 1** (Day 44)	Reward	**Spooky Mystery Box**; On Day 44, the housemates were asked to guess what was inside a box, which could contain a fake rat, a fake snake, or moving, living feet. The housemates must correctly guess the object inside to receive a puzzle piece that, when assembled, will contain the letter of their seventh weekly task.	All housemates	Passed
21	**September 4** (Day 47)	Special	On Day 47, as Kai was about to meet her biological mother, Jean, for the first time, Rain was tasked with preparing a special dinner for them both. Big Brother also assigned the "3J" — Jarren, JM, and JP — to serve as waiters for the event. Later, Kai's foster mother, Flora Mae, joined the gathering. Big Brother entrusted this special task to Rain because she was Kai's closest friend inside the house.	Jarren, JM, JP, and Rain	Passed
22	**September 5** (Day 48)	Secret; Reward	On Day 48, Big Brother observed JP's talent for making the housemates laugh and secretly informed him that they had already made four of the five allowable mistakes in their seventh weekly task. JP was given the opportunity to void these mistakes by completing a secret task: he needed to make all the housemates laugh to the point of tears. For each housemate he succeeded in making cry with laughter, one mistake would be voided. He was given four hours to complete this task and was provided with props to assist him.	JP	Passed
23	**September 17** (Day 60)	Daily	**Who Said That? — Part 1** On Day 60, the housemates took part in a game show hosted by Robi called "Who Said That?". In this game, two groups had to guess which member of the opposing group had said a specific line from the Rap Battle, which Big Brother displayed on the TV. After making their guesses, they rated the statement on a scale from one to three, with one being the least offensive and three being the most. Incorrect guesses resulted in a "punishment." The task was designed to teach a lesson about their uncontrolled actions and responses during the Rap Battle task.	All housemates	Passed
24	**September 17** (Day 60)	Punishment	**Who Said That? — Part 2** Later that same day, after the game concluded, Big Brother imposed a punishment on the housemates as a lesson from the Rap Battle task. Each housemate was required to carry sack weights corresponding to the total points they accumulated during the "Who Said That?" game, with each point equal to 2 kilograms. They had to wear the sack weights on their feet while performing their daily tasks until Big Brother gave the signal to stop. Weight table for the punishment task: Housemate / Total points / Equivalent weight; Adults: Jas / 11 pts. / 22 kgs.; Binsoy / 8 pts. / 16 kgs.; JM / 4 pts. / 8 kgs.; Kolette / 9 pts. / 18 kgs.; Teens: Rain / 7 pts. / 14 kgs.; Kai / 2 pts. / 4 kgs.; Fyang / 8 pts. / 16 kgs.; Jarren / 4 pts. / 8 kgs.; JP / 6 pts. / 12 kgs.	All housemates	Passed
25	**September 17** (Day 60)	Daily	**JP's "Dog Show" with Ramcy II**; During the punishment task, JP shared with Big Brother that he had a dog named "Ramcy" who had died. As a lighthearted challenge, Big Brother gave JP a special task: to perform 5 "dog tricks" with "Ramcy II," his new "pet dog" inside the house. However, the twist was that "Ramcy II" was actually the sack weight he had been carrying as part of the punishment task.	JP	Passed
26	**September 18** (Day 61)	Punishment	**Who Said That? — Part 3: Weight is Over**; On Day 62, the housemates were divided and were given an opportunity to reconcile following their Rap Battle task. To remove their weight sacks and officially release them from the punishment task, they were paired according to their previous pairings and asked by Big Brother to share what they admire about their partner, providing reasons for their sentiments.	All housemates	Passed
27	**September 19** (Day 62)	Special; Reward	On Day 62, JM had been waiting for a conversation with Fyang since they were divided into two groups. Big Brother agreed to this decision, but with one condition: JM must dress as a pilot and land a paper plane on the runway in the living room. Every time a paper plane lands on the runway, Big Brother will give JM one minute to speak with Fyang. He was given a full day to complete this task.	JM	Passed
28	**September 23** (Day 66)	Special	**Reverse Charades**; On Day 66, the housemates were introduced to the "K.K.K: Kakampi, Kasama, Kaibigan" weekly task, which began with a game of Reverse Charades. In this version of charades, pairs of housemates take on two roles: the standing player and the sitting player. The standing player must guess what their "BFF" plans to do with the ten thousand pesos given by Big Brother, while the sitting player, who knows the answers, must keep their hands and arms still to avoid providing hints. The standing player will act out their guesses based on the clues given by the sitting player. The housemates have a total of 5 minutes to complete this challenge before moving on to the trick shot task. "Reverse Charades" task results: Round / "BFF" Pair / Intention / Sitting player / Guesser / Result; 1 / Binsoy and Jarren / To buy school supplies / Jarren / Binsoy / Passed; 2 / Binsoy and Jarren / **To give help to Binsoy** / Binsoy / Jarren / Passed; 3 / Kai and Rain / To give assistance to Rain's cousin's damaged motorcycle / Rain / Kai / Passed; 4 / Kai and Rain / **To pay off Mommy Flora Mae's loans** / Kai / Rain / Failed; 5 / JP and Kolette / To give assistance to JP's mother's pares food business / JP / Kolette / Passed (Note: This round of charades will be considered correct because Kolette responded "to assist JP's mother's food business," despite not specifying what type of food business her mother runs.); 6 / JP and Kolette / **To give investment to Kolette's parents** / Kolette / JP / Failed; 7 / Fyang and JM / To give assistance to Fyang's uncle / Fyang / JM / Failed; 8 / Fyang and JM / **To give medicine to JM's mother** / JM / Fyang / Failed; Note: The intentions chosen by each pair are highlighted in **bold**.	Binsoy, Jarren, Kolette, and Kai	Passed
28	**September 23** (Day 66)	Special		Fyang, JM, JP and Rain	Failed
29	**September 25** (Day 68)	Luxury; Reward	On Day 68, Fyang and JM were tasked with cleaning all the dirty plates and dishes found in the garden area to earn the luxury reward of watching a movie in the house's home cinema. This task was sponsored by the dishwashing liquid brand Joy.	Fyang and JM	Passed
30	**September 26** (Day 69)	Special	**Ca-Sino Yun? (Ca-Who's That?)**; On Day 69, the housemates participated in a game called "Ca-Sino Yun," where five housemates took part in each round. Four acted as hiders, posing as mannequins in the living room, while one housemate served as the seeker, tasked with identifying the correct scent of Casino ethyl alcohol. Each hider was assigned a distinct scent, including fish sauce, soy sauce, and vinegar, with one carrying the scent of a Casino ethyl alcohol product: Active, Femme Dual, or Sanitizer variants. The seeker had 11 minutes to find the hider with the alcohol scent and earn a point. Upon completion, they were rewarded by Casino, the sponsor of the task.	All housemates	Passed
31	**October 2** (Day 75)	Special; Reward	**Cream Silk Hair Quiz**; The female housemates were quizzed on the lessons they learned from the Cream Silk hair experts the previous day. To earn a special reward from Cream Silk, the task's sponsor, they must provide eleven correct answers.	Fyang, Kai, Kolette and Rain	Passed
32	**October 9** (Day 82)	Luxury; Reward	The housemates were divided into two groups of three members each and tasked with imitating the hairstyles and makeup provided at each pit stop as quickly as possible. The group that completes the makeover in the fastest time wins and receives an exclusive pampering session sponsored by Cream Silk and Pond's. Groups: **Kai (leader), JM, and Kolette (55 minutes and 04 seconds)**; Fyang (leader), JP, and Rain (1 hour and 19 minutes)	All housemates	Passed
33	**October 10** (Day 83)	Luxury; Reward	**Two-Way Beauty Challenge**; On Day 83, the housemates, divided into the same groups from their first sponsored task, were assigned a "two-way beauty challenge." They had to create two videos: one showcasing a beauty transformation and the other a hair transformation, using Unilever's products, Pond's and Cream Silk, respectively. After submitting the videos to Big Brother, they also posted them on social media, where online netizens judged their entries. The group with the highest points won the opportunity to send a video message to their loved ones outside the house. This task was sponsored by Unilever, featuring Pond's and Cream Silk. Groups: **Team Kai #YasSlayKKJ - 27 points** Team Fyang #OhNaurWayFRJ - 25 points	All housemates	Passed
34	**October 11–12** (Days 84-85)	Special	**The Pond's "QT" Challenge**; On Days 84-85, the female housemates were assigned simple tasks for a chance to have a 100-second date with a male housemate of their choice. During each challenge, the male housemate had to pick either a task or a question from the "Pond's QT" bowl. If a question was chosen, the male housemate would answer it and discuss it with their partner within the 100 seconds. If a task was chosen, they had to complete it within the allotted time. Pond's provided a gift to assist with the task, as the activity was sponsored by Pond's.	All housemates	Passed
35	**October 18** (Day 91)	Luxury; Reward	**Bida sa Spelling (Spelling Hero)**; On Day 91, the final five housemates participated in the "Bida sa Spelling" challenge, sponsored by Bioderm soap. JM served as the host, while Fyang, Kai, Kolette, and Rain competed. In the challenge, the participants had to dig up a specific letter mentioned by JM, which was the first letter of a word they needed to spell. The first housemate to find the correct letter then washed their hands with Bioderm Bloom soap before spelling the word to earn a point. The housemate with the most points won the challenge and was awarded a luxury spa and massage, courtesy of Bioderm. **Winner(s): Fyang and Rain with 2 points each** Losers: Kai and Kolette with 0 points each	All housemates	Passed

=== House Challenger tasks ===
On Day 71, Big Brother introduced the 'House Challenger' twist, where evicted housemates or selected individuals were tasked with creating chaos and testing the authenticity and integrity of the remaining housemates. This twist aimed to help the public determine who should advance to the Big Four. For this season, Big Brother brought back four evicted housemates: Therese Villamor; the two-in-one housemates, Dingdong Bahan and Patrick Ramirez; Jas Dudley-Scales; and Jarren Garcia, who had been evicted earlier that day after receiving the lowest percentage of public votes to save. However, Jarren returned as a house challenger.

The table below outlines the tasks assigned to the five house challengers.

Task No.	Date & day assigned	Task description	Result
1	**September 28** (Day 71)	Critique and judge the strategies and gameplay of the seven remaining housemates.	Passed
2	**September 29** (Day 72)	Pack items for the seven remaining housemates, sufficient for one week. They were given the freedom to choose what to provide for the housemates, who would be living in the garden area for the week. They had 20 minutes to complete this challenge.	Passed
3	**October 1** (Day 74)	**Temptation**; Persuade and tempt the two housemates voted as having made the 'most contribution' in the house, Binsoy and JM, to remain inside and leave the other housemates outside.	Passed

=== The Big Task ===
On Day 94 (October 21), Big Brother officially introduced the "Big Task," the third and final twist in the larger "Big Payanig" twist, which aims to help the public determine the housemate most deserving of the title "Big Winner." For this season, Big Brother employed an artificial intelligence assistant named "Madam," whose role was to "assist Big Brother in his daily tasks." However, Madam's true function was to reveal the remaining housemates' true personalities.

During the "Big 4 Tapatan" (Big 4 Face-Off) held the day before on Day 93 (October 20), host Bianca Gonzalez asked the four finalists to identify the housemate they believed best exemplified a key trait of a Big 4 finalist: Rain was chosen as the "pinaka-matalino" (most intelligent), Kai as "pinaka-madiskarte" (most strategic), Kolette as "pinaka-maalaga" (most caring), and Fyang as "pinaka-maaasahan" (most reliable). Madam would later assign tasks based on these traits, serving as a test of their integrity and character.

Before Madam was introduced to the housemates, Big Brother gave letters to the finalists, informing them that they would be separated until further notice. Rain was assigned to stay in the task room, Kai in the boys' bedroom, Kolette in the living area, and Fyang in the girls' bedroom. During the period when Madam was present in the house, Big Brother was notably absent, as evidenced by the lack of response when the four finalists entered the confession room.

Below are the tasks assigned by "Madam" on behalf of Big Brother.

Task No.	Date & day assigned	Task description	Result
1	**October 20** (Day 93)	On Day 93, Madam assigned the housemates, particularly Rain, the task of solving a math equation that served as a clue for the final task. Rain was given one hour to complete the challenge. If she succeeded, the kamote they had eaten earlier would be replaced with tocino. (Note: The equation given was [(current year * age of youngest housemate) + (age of oldest housemate * number of housemates)] * 50 - (current year / 2) + 349,812. The clues given were: the youngest housemates' age is 16 (Kanata), the oldest housemates' age is 32 (Brx), and the number of housemates is 20 (there are sixteen [16] individual competitors and the two 2-in-1 housemates are counted separately [4]), therefore the correct solution was [(2024 * 16) + (32 * 20)] * 50 - (2024 / 2) + 349,812, and the correct answer was 2,000,000. However, Rain's answer was 1,975,412, which was 24,588 short of the correct value.)	Failed
2	**October 21** (Day 94)	On Day 94, Fyang was assigned the task of getting thirty wooden blocks within one hour in the garden area. During the task, she was not allowed to leave the spot where she was standing. To retrieve the blocks, she had to improvise using the materials provided: a long stick, tape, and a rope. If she successfully completed the task, the kamote they had been eating would be replaced with lechon manok (spit-roasted chicken).	Passed
3	**October 21** (Day 94)	On the same day, Kai was assigned the task of assembling the thirty wooden blocks provided by Fyang, which turned out to be a puzzle. When correctly assembled, the blocks would reveal the words "2 Million." If Kai successfully completed the task, the kamote they had been eating would be replaced with pizza.	Passed
4	**October 22** (Day 95)	Each housemate was tasked to defend the assembled wooden blocks from Madam's minions. If they successfully completed the task, the total cash prize for the Big Night for all four finalists will be ₱2,000,000; otherwise, failing to do so would "reduce" the cash prize to ₱1,000,000.	Failed
5	**October 23** (Day 96)	On Day 96, Madam attempted to sabotage the housemates by spreading misinformation. She falsely informed Kolette that it was her decision alone to steal the one-million-peso prize in exchange for her spot, while, in reality, the other three housemates had "unanimously" agreed to this choice after Madam manipulated the context of her question. First, Madam isolated Kolette in the storage area and then instructed Fyang, Kai, and Rain to throw Kolette's belongings into the swimming pool. However, three housemates refused to carry out this task.	Passed
6	**October 23** (Day 96)	For their final task, all housemates must defend the assembled wooden blocks from Madam's reinforcements.	Passed

== Challenges ==
=== Group challenges ===
As in previous seasons, the housemates were divided into multiple teams to compete for immunity on various occasions.

Challenge No.	Date given	Challenge title and description	Winner	Loser(s)	Ref.
1	September 9 (Day 52)	Teens vs. Adults; On Day 52, the housemates were divided into two groups: the teens and the adults. To fully separate the groups, Jas and Fyang read a task letter instructing the housemates—Jarren, JP, Kolette, and Jas—to move their belongings from the boys' bedroom to the girls' bedroom, and vice versa. They were given three minutes to complete the transfer. Throughout the week, communication between the two groups was strictly prohibited. The housemates in both groups were subjected to tasks and challenges that tested their teamwork, strategy, and camaraderie. Additionally, their eighth weekly task was based on this challenge, with the winning group receiving immunity, while the losing group became vulnerable to eviction. Big Brother continued to keep the housemates apart until further notice on Day 58, when the challenge came to an end. Groups: Teens: Fyang, Jarren, JP, Kai and Rain; Adults: Binsoy, Dylan, Jas, JM, and Kolette; Tasks given: Two Towers: The housemates in both groups were tasked with creating a tower out of paper cups but had to assemble it without using their hands or arms. To secure the entire weekly budget, both towers had to reach a minimum height of five feet. The group with the tallest tower at the end of the challenge would win immunity from the next eviction, while the other group would be vulnerable to eviction. In the final battle, each team will have two hours to assemble their tower in the living area. They will then try to destroy each other's tower by pulling and raising their flags and attempting to do so.; Rap Battle: The housemates in both groups faced a rap battle, with one teen and one adult housemate competing against each other in the living area. The winner of the "Two Towers" weekly task had the privilege of choosing their opponent. The match-ups, broadcast in chronological order on September 14 (Day 57), were: Kolette vs. Rain, Jas vs. Fyang, JM vs. JP, Dylan vs. Kai, and Binsoy vs. Jarren.	Teens Fyang, Jarren, JP, Kai, Rain	Adults Binsoy, Dylan, Jas, JM, Kolette	

=== Ligtask ===
Carried over from the previous season, nominees would face challenges to ensure their safety from the impending eviction.

Challenge No.
Date given
Challenge title and description
Participants
Saved
Ref.
1
September 15
(Day 58)
Binsoy, Jas, JM, and Kolette are required to transfer two balls, one by one, using a pipe from Point A to Point B. If a ball falls, they must return to the starting point. The fastest to complete the task will be saved from nomination.

First LigTask challenge final result
Housemate	Time elapsed
Binsoy	3:18
JM	3:56
Jas	4:33
Kolette	8:14

Binsoy
Jas
JM
Kolette
Binsoy
(3 min, 18 secs.)

2
September 28
(Day 71) (Note: Jarren was in the house when the task was performed. The result of this task was aired on September 29 (Day 72), one day after the ninth eviction night.)
The pair housemates of the "K.K.K.: Kakampi, Kasama, Kaibigan" weekly task must flip a bottle and race to place their checker on the finish line. Each housemate starts at the first line and must cross five lines to reach the "ligtas" (safe) line. For each successful bottle flip, they have two options: advance their checker to the next line or move their opponent's checker back to the previous line. The first housemate to cross the finish line will be saved, while the other will face automatic nomination. (Note: Jarren won his battle with Binsoy, but he was evicted before the tenth nomination night, rendering his immunity void.)

Second LigTask challenge final result
Challenge No.	Pairs	Winner (Saved)	Loser (Nominated)
1	Binsoy & Jarren	~~Jarren~~	Binsoy
2	Kai & Rain	Kai	Rain
3	JP & Kolette	Kolette	JP
4	Fyang & JM	Fyang	JM

Binsoy
Fyang
~~Jarren~~
JM
JP
Kai
Kolette
Rain
Fyang
~~Jarren~~
Kai
Kolette

=== House challenges ===
The housemates and house challengers will compete in a series of team challenges designed by Big Brother to test their camaraderie and teamwork. The outcome of each challenge may significantly influence who remains and who leaves as the final approaches. The battle between housemates and challengers officially began on Day 76 (October 3).

Legend:

- Housemates : Binsoy, Fyang, JM, JP, Kai, Kolette, and Rain
- House Challengers : Dingdong & Patrick, Jas, Jarren, and Therese

Challenge No.	Date given	Challenge title and description	Winner	Loser(s)	Ref.
1	October 3 (Day 76)	One Foot Tug-of-War; A housemate and a house challenger will pull a rope with both hands while standing on one foot inside a designated circle. To win, they must either force their opponent to step out of the circle or cause their other foot to touch the ground. The winner of each match-up earns one minute for their group to complete a tangram puzzle in the second part of the challenge.	House Challengers	Housemates	
1	October 3 (Day 76)	Tangram Puzzle; The housemates and house challengers must each assemble five tangram puzzles using the time they earned during the One Foot Tug-of-War challenge. To win, the group must assemble the words "GEN 11" faster than their opponents.	House Challengers	Housemates	
2	October 5 (Day 78)	Stick-Lipat (Stick-Move); The housemates and house challengers must race to be the first to transfer all of their objects to the opponents' side using a long stick. The first to clear their table and successfully move all objects wins. However, any player who rings their bell is disqualified from participating in the next games. If the housemates win against the house challengers, they will receive half of their weekly budget.	Housemates	House Challengers	

=== The Big Love ===
On Day 87 (October 14), Big Brother invited the loved ones of the remaining five housemates into the house. This twist, called "The Big Love," the second of the three major twists within the larger "Big Payanig" twist, first revealed on Day 78. "The Big Love" seeks to push the housemates' feelings to the limit and put them through even more emotional testing.

For this challenge, each housemate, together with their loved one, will compete in three "Big Love" elimination rounds. The winning pair at the end of the challenges will receive a cash prize of one hundred thousand pesos (₱100,000) that will be deducted from their Maya savings account (which in turn is derived from their Save or Spend Weekly Task twist; see twists), and an all-expense paid trip to Boracay for four courtesy of Mitzy Travel & Tours. At the end of each challenge, each pair will be given 100 seconds to interact and say their goodbyes, and the housemate representative will receive a gift.

The following are the names of the loved ones of the five remaining housemates, arranged in alphabetical order by the housemates' names:

- Hayden Smith, Fyang's brother
- Lander Ibarra, JM's brother
- Estrella Ibarra, JM's mother
- Kennett Montinola, Kai's foster father
- Nanette Oca, Kolette's adopted mother
- Ronald Madelo, Kolette's father
- Jennifer Celmar, Rain's mother

Challenge No.	Date given	Challenge title and description	Advanced	Eliminated	Ref.
1	October 13–14 (Days 86-87)	ILY Challenge — I For the first round, each pair must roll a ping-pong ball along a rope, aiming to land it in one of five glasses, each assigned a specific point value. The nearest glass is worth one point, while the farthest is worth five points, with the difficulty increasing as the hole of the glasses become progressively smaller. To earn points, the ball must successfully land in the corresponding glass. Each pair is given one hour to accumulate as many points as possible. The pair with the lowest score after all have played will be eliminated and will not advance to the next round.	Kai & Kennett; 228 pts. (Note: During the October 14 broadcast, it was reported that Kai and Kennett had accumulated a total of 225 points. However, in the October 15 episode, their total points increased to 228.) Rain & Jennifer; 157 pts. JM & Lander; 108 pts. Kolette & Nanette; 53 pts.	Fyang & Hayden; 20 pts.	
2	October 15 (Day 88)	ILY Challenge — L For the second round, housemates must throw their color-coded sandbags onto an L-shaped platform on the opposite side of the pool. To score, the sandbags must land on the platform. If a housemate's sandbag knocks another housemate's sandbag off the platform, the latter's score will be reduced. They have six hours to accumulate as many points as possible. Later, each loved one assisted by throwing ten sandbags on behalf of their housemate. The pair with the lowest score will be eliminated.	Kai & Kennett; 16 pts. JM & Lander; 15 pts. Kolette & Nanette; 14 pts.	Rain & Jennifer; 9 pts.	
3	October 17–18 (Days 90–91)	ILY Challenge — Y For the third and final round, the three remaining housemates faced an endurance challenge where they had to hold onto a seesaw while defending their respective balloons from popping. At regular intervals, sandbags equal to 5% of their body weight were added. Nails were placed at the bottom of each seesaw, ready to pop the balloon if released. If a housemate's balloon popped, they were eliminated. The last housemate standing would win the challenge and be awarded ₱100,000 and a trip to Boracay for four.	JM	Kolette; 2nd elim. Kai; 1st elim. (Note: Kai fainted during the challenge, which technically resulted in her elimination from the competition.)	

== Nomination history ==
Each nomination table cell indicates two points to the first housemate named and one point to the second housemate named.

Fyang Smith, the winner of this season has the most nomination points by a winner with 56 nomination points, surpassing the record of Anji Salvacion of the previous season with 25 nomination points.

Color key:

Immune or exempt
Saved via veto, challenge, or twist
Automatically nominated
Ineligible to vote

Pinoy Big Brother: Gen 11 nomination history
	#1	#2	#3	Punishment	#5	#6	#7	Teens vs. Adults Ligtask #1	#9	Ligtask #2	Rank Based	The Big Payanig	Big Night	Nominations Received
	#1	#2	#3	#4	#5	#6	#7	#8	#9	#10	#11	#12	Big Night	Nominations Received
Eviction Day and Date	Day 15 Aug 3	Day 22 Aug 10	Day 29 Aug 17	Day 36 Aug 24	Day 43 Aug 31	Day 50 Sept 7	Day 57 Sept 14	Day 64 Sept 21	Day 71 Sept 28	Day 78 Oct 5	Day 85 Oct 12	Day 92 Oct 19	Day 99 Oct 26	Nominations Received
Nomination Day and Date	Day 9 July 28	Day 16; Aug 4	Day 23; Aug 11	Day 32; Aug 20	Day 37; Aug 25	Day 44; Sept 1	Day 53; Sept 10	Day 59; Sept 16	Day 65; Sept 22	Day 72; Sept 29	Day 81; Oct 8	Day 86; Oct 13	Day 92; Oct 19	Nominations Received
Fyang	Not in the House	Exempt	Jas; Kai	No nominations	Jas; Dylan	Gwen & Joli; Kolette	Rain; Jarren	No nominations	Kai; Jarren	No nominations	4th-5th (25 points)	No nominations	Winner	56 (+1)
Rain	Kanata; Therese	Binsoy; Marc	Dylan; Binsoy	No nominations	Kolette; Jan	Fyang; Kolette	Kolette; Dylan	No nominations	Fyang; Jarren	No nominations	6th (27 points)	No nominations	Runner-up	39 (+2)
Kolette	Noimie; Therese	Marc; Dylan	Dong & Pat; Brx	No nominations	Fyang; Binsoy	Fyang; Kai	Dylan; Jarren	No nominations	Fyang; JP	No nominations	3rd (20 points)	No nominations	3rd Place	46 (+2)
Kai	Kanata; Therese	Dylan; Marc	Noimie; JM	No nominations	Jan; Fyang	Fyang; JM	Fyang; JM	No nominations	Jarren; JP	No nominations	2nd (16 points)	No nominations	4th Place	36 (+1)
JM	Therese; Dong & Pat	Dong & Pat; Marc	Dong & Pat; Dylan	No nominations	Dylan; Kai	Gwen & Joli; Dylan	Dylan; Rain	No nominations	Kai; Jarren	No nominations	1st (13 points)	No nominations	Evicted (Day 92)	28 (+2)
JP	Not in the House			Exempt	Jas; Fyang	Binsoy; Kolette	Rain; JM	No nominations	Fyang; Kai	No nominations	4th-5th (25 points)	Evicted (Day 85)		32 (+1)
Binsoy	Therese; Noimie	Kolette; Kanata	Noimie; Dong & Pat	No nominations	Jan; JP	Rain; Kai	JP; Kai	No nominations	Kolette; Kai	No nominations	Evicted (Day 78)			8 (+1)
Jarren	Therese; Kai	Kai; Kanata	Dong & Pat; Brx	No nominations	Jan; Fyang	Fyang; Gwen & Joli	Kai; Kolette	No nominations	Kai; Rain	Evicted (Day 71)				7
Jas	Noimie; Therese	Kanata; Kolette	JM; Kai	No nominations	Fyang; Jan	Fyang; Binsoy	Kolette; Kai	No nominations	Evicted (Day 64)					14 (+1)
Dylan	Noimie; Therese	Marc; Kolette	Kolette; Dong & Pat	No nominations	Jan; Fyang	Kolette; Fyang	Fyang; Rain	Evicted (Day 57)						16 (+2)
Gwen Joli	Not in the House		No 2-in-1 connection (Days 24–33)		JM; Fyang	JM; Fyang	Evicted (Day 50)							5
Jan	Not in the House	Exempt	Dong & Pat; Kolette	No nominations	JP; Kolette	Evicted (Day 43)								10
Dingdong Patrick	JM; Brx	Marc; JM	Brx; Jas	No nominations	Evicted (Day 36)									17 (+1)
Noimie	Jas; Kolette	Brx; Dylan	Jas; Brx	Evicted (Day 29)										17
Brx	Noimie; JM	Rain; Noimie	Dong & Pat; Rain	Evicted (Day 29)										8
Kanata	Therese; Noimie	Kolette; Binsoy	Evicted (Day 22)											8
Marc	Noimie; Jas	Dong & Pat; Kolette	Evicted (Day 22)											9
Therese	Jas; JM	Evicted (Day 15)												13
Notes	^{1}	^{2,} ^{3}	^{2,} ^{4}	^{5,} ^{6,} ^{7}	^{8,} ^{9}	^{None}	^{10}	^{11,} ^{12,} ^{13}	^{None}	^{14}	^{15}	^{16,} ^{17}	^{18}	
Ligtask Winner(s)	None							Binsoy	None	Fyang; ~~Jarren~~; Kai; Kolette	None			
Up for eviction	Dylan; Noimie; Therese	Dong & Pat; Dylan; Kanata; Kolette; Marc	Brx; Dong & Pat; Jas; Noimie	Dong & Pat; Dylan; Fyang; Kai; Kolette; Rain	Fyang; Jan; Jas	Fyang; Gwen & Joli; Kolette	Dylan; Kolette; Rain	Jas; JM; Kolette	Fyang; Jarren; Kai	Binsoy; JM; JP; Rain	Fyang; JP; Rain	Open; Voting		
Saved from eviction	Dylan; 40.06% Noimie; 22.57%	Dong & Pat; 42.14% Kolette; 13.45% Dylan; 13.24%	Dong & Pat; 26.84% Jas; 15.42%	Rain; 18.63% Fyang; 13.91% Kolette; 13.91% Kai; 13.05% Dylan; 11.05%	Fyang; 34.36% Jas; 11.59%	Fyang; 42.32% Kolette; 32.59%	Rain; 39.02% Kolette; 31.94%	Kolette; 40.42% JM; 36.14%	Kai; 43.97% Fyang; 32.97%	Rain; 54.79% JM; 19.14% JP; 13.19%	Fyang; 54.03% Rain; 36.35%	Housemate A 22.54% Housemate B 21.83% Housemate E 20.14% Housemate C 18.17%	Fyang; 30.66%	
Evicted	Therese; 16.22%	Kanata; 11.61% Marc; 5.09%	Noimie; 13.22% Brx; 9.84%	Dong & Pat; 9.66%	Jan; 6.86%	Gwen & Joli; 5.29%	Dylan; 11.05%	Jas; 23.44%	Jarren; 23.06%	Binsoy; 12.88%	JP; 9.61%	JM; 17.32%	Rain; 26.05% Kolette; 25.91% Kai; 17.38%	
References														

Notes

1. When the housemates failed to win their first weekly task, the eleven individuals who were declared as "official housemates" were tasked in selecting who among the four "houseguests" will they automatically nominate for eviction—they chose Dylan.
2. This is a double eviction, as two nominees were evicted.
3. Fyang and Jan were exempt from nominations this week because they were new entrants. Both entered the house on Day 16, which was the date of the second nomination night.
4. Fyang and Jan were still exempt from nominations this week, but they can now nominate.
5. Joli and JP were exempt from nominations this week because they were new entrants. Both entered the house on Day 24, a day after the third nomination night. They were included in the punishment tasks on Day 30, but are ineligible for nomination because they only entered the house six days before.
6. On Day 30, the housemates were punished for consistently breaking the rules during their time inside the house. Violations included not wearing a lapel, whispering, sleeping at random times during the day, swearing, breaking things, using sign language, asking about the outside world, and discussing nominations. As punishment, they were assigned a variety of punishment tasks, with the first seven "rule-breaker" housemates receiving "automatic nominations".
7. On Day 31, the final list of nominees for the week was officially announced based on the number of violations they had committed: Fyang and Rain with 16 each, Kai and Kolette with 14 each, Dingdong and Patrick with 13 violations, and Dylan with 11 violations. The remaining unnominated housemates who were not on the list had fewer than 11 violations: JM had 10, Binsoy had 9, Jarren had 6, Jan had 5, Jas had 4, Joli had 2, and JP had 1. Only one of the six nominees will be evicted at the end of the week.
8. Gwen was exempt from nominations this week because he was a new entrant. He entered the house on Day 33, a day after the fourth nomination night. This was later voided when he was merged with Joli as a two-in-one housemate.
9. On Day 34, Big Brother merged Gwen and Joli into a two-in-one housemate due to their situation in the outside world. If Joli is included in the list of nominees in the fifth nomination round, Gwen will be included as well, despite the fact that they were merged as a two-in-one housemate despite entering the house only four days before the fifth nomination night, and the two entered on separate days.
10. The nominees for the seventh nomination round were kept secret from the housemates but were announced to the viewers on Day 53, with voting proceeding as usual. The housemates were given clues about the nominees through a red box placed in the living area, containing three envelopes with the nominees' information. Only one of the nominees would be evicted on Day 57, the seventh eviction night.
11. Due to the widespread and violent use of the vote-to-evict against several housemates, only the vote-to-save will be used beginning with the eighth nomination round.
12. The "Two Towers" weekly task determined the nominees for the eighth nomination round. The team that assembled the highest stack of paper cups without using their hands or arms received immunity for this round, while the losing team faced eviction.
13. The adult housemates, Binsoy, Jas, JM, and Kolette, faced their first Ligtask challenge, which required them to transfer two balls from Point A to Point B in the quickest time possible using a pipe. Binsoy was announced as the fastest finisher of the challenge, clocking in at 3 minutes and 18 seconds, leaving Jas, JM, and Kolette as nominees for this round, with only one of them being evicted at the end of the week.
14. The pairs from the weekly task "K.K.K: Kakampi, Kasama, Kaibigan" competed in their second Ligtask challenge in which they had to flip a bottle and be the first to cross their checkers on the finish line; the winner was saved from eviction, while the loser was automatically nominated. Fyang, Jarren, Kai, and Kolette were the first to finish the game in their respective rounds, excluding Binsoy, JM, JP, and Rain from eviction, with one of them evicted at the end of the week on Day 78. Jarren was evicted on Day 71, the ninth eviction night. If he had been saved from eviction, his immunity would have taken effect during this nomination round.
15. For the eleventh round of nominations, housemates ranked each other, including themselves, to determine the nominees. The three housemates with the highest points were safe from eviction, while the bottom three were nominated. For the full detail of the result in this nominations, see Rank-based nomination result.
16. For the twelfth and final nomination round, no regular nominations took place. Instead, an open voting process for the Big 4 was conducted, with unlimited voting replacing the previous 15-votes-per-day limit. One of the final five housemates, who received the lowest percentage of votes to become a finalist, was evicted on October 19 (Day 92).
17. Voting was temporarily closed at 9:00 PM on the twelfth eviction night to carry over the votes to the Big Night. This means that the votes accumulated from the start of unlimited voting on October 13 (Day 86) until the re-opening of the voting lines after the twelfth eviction night will be combined as these votes will determine the season's winner.
18. For the final, the public voted for the housemate they wanted to win Pinoy Big Brother: Gen 11. Unlimited voting was still implemented for this round. Since the votes from the open voting on October 13 (Day 86) were included, the percentage tally will reflect the total votes accumulated by both finalists across the two voting periods, unless a separate percentage tally for the second voting round is released.

=== Special nomination processes ===
In certain instances, Big Brother may implement a special nomination process during a nomination round, replacing the usual private nominations in the confession room. Typically, these alternative nomination processes are conducted face-to-face and are seldom private.

==== Contribution nominations ====
On Day 74 (October 1), the seven remaining housemates voted face-to-face for two housemates they believed had made the most significant contributions (ambag) in the house. Each vote counted as one point, as shown in the table below. The top two housemates with the highest votes were deemed safe from the upcoming challenges against the house challengers and would return to the main house. Meanwhile, the five unchosen housemates, who had been staying outside for a week as part of the challenge, had to face two challenges against the house challengers. Those unchosen were at risk of losing their housemate status to the challengers.

At the end of the nomination process, with a vote tally of 7-4-1-1-1-0-0, Binsoy and JM were declared safe from the challenges against the house challengers and were granted re-entry into the house. Meanwhile, Fyang, JP, Kai, Kolette, and Rain were left to face the house challengers, where they had to defend their housemate status.

Housemate	Voted for...	No. of votes received
Binsoy	Binsoy; JM	7
Fyang	Binsoy; Fyang	1
JM	Binsoy; JM	4
JP	Binsoy; JM	0
Kai	Binsoy; Kolette	1
Kolette	Binsoy; JM	1
Rain	Binsoy; Kai	0

==== Rank-based nominations ====
On Day 81 (October 8), the six remaining housemates ranked themselves, including each other, based on who they believed deserved to be the season's Big Winner, with first place being the most deserving and sixth place the least. The total points each housemate received determined the final ranking and the nominees for the week, with the top three housemates with the most points facing eviction. The initial rankings were made in the confession room, and any final adjustments were completed in the garden area if a housemate decided to change their ranking. On Day 82 (October 9), a face-to-face nomination was held where housemates' self-rankings were revealed. However, the results were only made public the previous day, along with the final rankings, after which public voting commenced.

The underlined names below represent the rankings the housemates assigned to themselves.

Housemate	1st	2nd	3rd	4th	5th	6th
Fyang	Fyang	JM	JP	Kolette	Rain	Kai
JM	JM	Kai	Fyang	Kolette	Rain	JP
JP	JP	JM	Kolette	Kai	Rain	Fyang
Kai	Kai	JM	Rain	Kolette	Fyang	JP
Kolette	Kolette	Kai	JP	JM	Fyang	Rain
Rain	Kai	JM	Rain	Kolette	Fyang	JP
Overall Rank	JM; 13 points	Kai; 16 points	Kolette; 20 points	Fyang & JP; 25 points		Rain; 27 points
Reference(s)						

=== S-E voting system results ===
The Save-Evict voting method was discontinued after the seventh eviction round, and only the original vote-to-save method was used beginning with the eighth eviction round.

Eviction No.	Nominee	Votes			Result	Refs.
Eviction No.	Nominee	To-Save	To-Evict	Net Total	Result	Refs.
1	Dylan	43.05%	-2.99%	40.06%	Saved	
1	Noimie	26.89%	-4.32%	22.57%	Saved	
1	Therese	19.49%	-3.27%	16.22%	Evicted	
2	Dong & Pat	43.85%	-1.71%	42.14%	Saved	
2	Dylan	13.86%	-0.62%	13.24%	Saved	
2	Kanata	12.44%	-0.83%	11.61%	Evicted	
2	Kolette	15.67%	-2.22%	13.45%	Saved	
2	Marc	6.94%	-1.85%	5.09%	Evicted	
3	Brx	12.51%	-2.67%	9.84%	Evicted	
3	Dong & Pat	30.89%	-4.05%	26.84%	Saved	
3	Jas	25.23%	-9.81%	15.42%	Saved	
3	Noimie	14.03%	-0.81%	13.22%	Evicted	
4	Dong & Pat	10.17%	-0.51%	9.66%	Evicted	
4	Dylan	11.29%	-0.24%	11.05%	Saved	
4	Fyang	21.08%	-7.17%	13.91%	Saved	
4	Kai	13.66%	-0.61%	13.05%	Saved	
4	Kolette	14.65%	-0.74%	13.91%	Saved	
4	Rain	19.25%	-0.62%	18.63%	Saved	
5	Fyang	40.38%	-6.02%	34.36%	Saved	
5	Jan	8.18%	-1.32%	6.86%	Evicted	
5	Jas	27.85%	-16.26%	11.59%	Saved	
6	Fyang	46.32%	-4.00%	42.32%	Saved	
6	Gwen & Joli	6.40%	-1.11%	5.29%	Evicted	
6	Kolette	37.38%	-4.79%	32.59%	Saved	
7	Dylan	16.43%	-5.38%	11.05%	Evicted	
7	Kolette	34.75%	-2.81%	31.94%	Saved	
7	Rain	39.82%	-0.80%	39.02%	Saved	

== The Final Stage at The Big Night ==
The season finale, dubbed The Final Stage at The Big Night was simultaneously held on October 26, 2024 at ABS-CBN Studio 10 and Dolphy Theatre in Quezon City, and aired on a special timeslot running from 8:30 p.m. to 10:05 p.m..

It included performances from past Big Winners James Reid from Teen Clash 2010, Maymay Entrata from Lucky 7, and Anji Salvacion from Kumunity Season 10, 737 Teen finalist Bailey May, and former housemates Joshua Garcia from All In, Jameson Blake from 737 Adult batch, and Seth Fedelin from Otso Batch 1. During their performance, hosts Melai Cantiveros, Enchong Dee, and Alexa Ilacad joined them, along with the evicted housemates from this season.

At the end of the night, Kai Montinola was declared the fourth Big Placer with 17.38% of the total public vote, followed by Kolette Madelo in third place with 25.91%, and Fyang Smith as the season's winner with 30.66% of the total public vote, ahead of Rain Celmar, who was ranked second with 26.05%.

Day 99: Big Winner Vote
Housemate		Percentage of Votes	Result
B	Rain	26.05%	2nd Big Placer
I	Kai	17.38%	4th Big Placer
G	Fyang	30.66%	Big Winner
4	Kolette	25.91%	3rd Big Placer
Total Votes		100%	—N/a

== Reunion ==
In conclusion to the Big Night, a special episode dubbed Aba, Ayos! Ang Pagtatapos: The Reunion Special (lit. 'Well, Nice! The Ending: The Reunion Special') featured the reunion of the former housemates (with the exception of Noimie, who was abroad at the time of the season's finale) and the finalists on October 27, 2024, the Day 100 of PBB: Gen 11.

This season, the traditional üBER-Acting segment returned, with the hosts re-enacting three of the season's most iconic moments. First, Melai portrayed Brx in the "tocino" incident, while Robi and Enchong took on the roles of two-in-one housemates Dingdong and Patrick. Next, Alexa and Melai re-enacted the intense Rap Battle task between Jas and Fyang, with Robi and Enchong making non-speaking cameos as JM and Dylan. Finally, the face-off between housemates and house challengers was brought to life by Robi as JM, Melai as Therese and Kolette, Alexa as Kai, and Bianca as Fyang.

== Spin-off ==
A spin-off reality series titled Pinoy Big Brother: Gen 11 Big 4 Ever has been commissioned following the immense success of the season. It aired on Kapamilya Channel, Kapamilya Online Live, A2Z, TV5, iWantTFC and TFC from December 9, 2024 to January 24, 2025 at a timeslot of 9:30 p.m. to 10:00 p.m..

It featured the housemates from this season, with a greater focus on the show's finalists. Hosted by Robi Domingo and Bianca Gonzalez, the series delved into discussions with the housemates, showcase their lives after the show, and present never-before-seen footage that was not aired during the season. This marks the second reality spin-off in the franchise since Melason in Love from the Double Up season in 2010. The spin-off ran for 35 episodes, and was replaced by How to Spot a Red Flag in its timeslot.

== Reception ==
Due to the season's high engagement with viewers and fans on various social media platforms, a huge number of violent remarks and bashing towards the housemates concerned the show, prompting the release of an official statement from the management to take legal actions on such matters, as well as the removal of the vote-to-evict system during the seventh eviction round.

The show had also been summoned by the Movie and Television Review and Classification Board or MTRCB to address complaints by the viewers regarding different controversies happened during the season.

On the other hand, this season has also received a lot of positive reception from the viewers, resulting in a lot of concurrent viewers during major episodes, with 2.26 million all-time high peak concurrent viewers during the Big Night, which also received an all-time high TV rating of 10.7% on October 26, 2024, according to the Nielsen NUTAM People Survey.

== Notes ==
Preceded by Kumunity 10	Pinoy Big Brother: Gen 11 (July 20, 2024—October 26, 2024)	Succeeded by Celebrity Collab Edition
