= List of Greek television series =

Television broadcasting in Greece began in 1966. Nevertheless, the first TV series was aired in 1970 and was the series To Spiti me ton Foinika, aired by YENED. The next series was O Kyrios Synigoros in the same year. The first years of television there were only public channels. The first channels were the channel EIR and the TED, the channel of armed forces. A few years later, TED was renamed to YENED and EIR became EIRT. The public channels renamed again after the coming of PASOK in the power and they became ERT1 and ERT2. Famous series of the period of public television are O Agnostos Polemos, I Geitonia Mas, Louna Park, Christ Recrucified, Methoriakos Stathmos, oi Pantheoi. In 1989, Greek television entered in a new period, the period of private television. The first private TV channels started to broadcast in 1989. The period 1995–2009 is the best period of the Greek television and frequently characterized as the golden age of the Greek TV.

== Public television era (1970–1989) ==
=== 1970–1979 ===
Title	Years	Channel	Genre	Notes
To spiti me ton foinika	1970	YENED	Drama	The first Greek television series - 1 season (13 episodes)
O kyrios synigoros	1970–72	YENED	Comedy	3 seasons (256 episodes)
13o anakritiko grafeio	1971	EIRT	Crime fiction	1 season (15 episodes)
Grafeio synoikesion	1971	EIRT	Comedy	1 season (3 episodes)
Doktor Tik	1971	EIRT	Comedy	1 season (71 episodes)
I proti grammi	1971	EIRT	Adventure	1 season (13 episodes)
O spaggoramenos	1971	EIRT	Comedy	1 season (34 episodes)
To periptero	1971	YENED	Drama	1 season (7 episodes)
Paihnidismata	1971–72	YENED	Comedy	1 season (?? episodes)
I kokkoromyali	1971–73	YENED	Comedy	3 seasons (202 episodes)
O kyrios, i kyria kai i mama	1971–73	YENED	Comedy	2 seasons (67 episodes)
Agnostos polemos	1971–74	YENED	Drama, War, Adventure	5 seasons (226 episodes)
Oikogeneia Tamtourla	1972	EIRT	Comedy	1 season (13 episodes)
Pater familias	1972	YENED	Comedy	1 season (37 episodes)
O anthropakos	1972	YENED	Satire	1 season (12 episodes)
O Dinos sti hora ton thavmaton	1972	YENED	Comedy	1 season (10 episodes)
Paraxenos taxidiotis	1972	EIRT	Drama	3 seasons (256 episodes)
Axiomatikos ypiresias	1972–73	EIRT	Comedy	1 season (67 episodes)
I taverna	1972–73	EIRT	Drama	2 seasons (110 episodes)
Kekleismenon ton thyron	1972–73	EIRT	Thriller	2 seasons (98 episodes)
Sta dihtya tis arahnis	1972–73	EIRT	Drama	1 season (36 episodes)
To koritsi tis Kyriakis	1972–73	EIRT	Drama	2 seasons (110 episodes)
Stisihorou '73	1972–74	YENED	Drama	2 seasons (52 episodes)
To eikositetraoro enos paliatzi	1972–74	EIRT	Satire	2 seasons (105 episodes)
Ekeinos ki ekeinos	1972–74	EIRT	Comedy	2 seasons (103 episodes)
I geitonia mas	1972–77	YENED	Comedy	6 seasons (550 episodes)
Enas apithanos detective	1973	YENED	Comedy	1 season (8 episodes)
O mikros iroas	1973	YENED	Adventure	1 season (27 episodes)
O kyrios genikos	1973	YENED	Satire	1 season (13 episodes)
Ena yperoho zevgari	1973	EIRT	Drama	1 season (18 episodes)
O Thomas kai o Hatzithomas	1973	EIRT	Comedy	1 season (25 episodes)
To mavro kleidi	1973	YENED	Thriller	1 season (9 episodes)
Sta dihtya tou tromou	1973	EIRT	Mystery	1 season (25 episodes)
O kosmos kai o Kosmas	1973–74	EIRT	Comedy	1 season (31 episodes)
Apo tin alli ohthi	1973–74	EIRT	Drama	1 season (36 episodes)
Oi emporoi ton ethnon	1973–74	EIRT	History	1 season (52 episodes)
Psilikatzidiko o Kosmos	1973–74	EIRT	Comedy	1 season (26 episodes)
38o astynomiko tmima	1973	YENED	Drama	1 season (13 episodes)
Dromos horis gyrismo	1973–74	YENED	Drama	1 season (167 episodes)
Viva Katerina	1973–75	YENED	Comedy	3 seasons (120 episodes)
Ta paidia tou Zevedaiou	1973–75	EIRT	Drama	2 seasons (67 episodes)
O oneiroparmenos	1973–75	YENED	Comedy	2 seasons (111 episodes)
Anthropines istories	1973–75	YENED	Drama	2 seasons (92 episodes)
To theatro tis Defteras	1973–74, 1976–97	EIRT	Comedy/Drama	22 seasons (500+ episodes)
Apo ton pappou ston eggono	1974	EIRT	Comedy	1 season (?? episodes)
Alithines istories	1974	YENED	Thriller	1 season (?? episodes)
To palio to katostari	1974	YENED	Comedy	1 season (46 episodes)
Mono gia sas	1974	YENED	Comedy	1 season (?? episodes)
O asterismos ton lykon	1974–75	YENED	Drama	1 season (37 episodes)
I gyftopoula	1974–75	YENED	Drama	1 season (48 episodes)
Oi dikaioi	1974–76	YENED	Thriller	2 seasons (125 episodes)
Megalo tileoptiko theama	1974–76	YENED	Comedy/Drama	3 seasons (?? episodes)
To louna park	1974–81	EIRT	Comedy	7 seasons (330 episodes)
Methoriakos stathmos	1974–81	YENED	Drama	7 seasons (349 episodes)
Dyskola hronia	1975	YENED	Drama	1 season (13 episodes)
Menexedenia politeia	1975	EIRT	Drama	1 season (36 episodes)
Enas Pygmalion	1975	YENED	Drama	1 season (15 episodes)
Tereza Varma Dakosta	1975	EIRT	Romantic	1 season (26 episodes)
Christ Recrucified	1975–76	EIRT	Drama	2 seasons (50 episodes)
Vasilissa Amalia	1975–76	EIRT	History	1 season (68 episodes)
I Themis ehei kefia	1975–76	EIRT	Comedy	2 seasons (29 episodes)
O anthropos mas	1975–76	YENED	Drama	1 season (24 episodes)
Ase ton kosmo na gelasei	1975–76	YENED	Satire	1 season (37 episodes)
O vasilias kai to agalma	1975–76	YENED	History	1 season (27 episodes)
Romaios kai Ioulietta	1975–76	YENED	Romantic	1 season (26 episodes)
Foteini Zarkou	1975–76	YENED	History	1 season (30 episodes)
Periplous	1975–78	YENED	History	3 seasons (85 episodes)
Ap' tin komodia sto drama	1975–80	YENED	Comedy/Drama	6 seasons (176 episodes)
Enas ippotis metaxy mas	1976	ERT	Comedy	1 season (13 episodes)
I dikaiosyni milise	1976	ERT	Drama	1 season (?? episodes)
Mikroi iroes	1976	ERT	Drama	1 season (8 episodes)
Skoteines dynameis	1976	ERT	Drama	1 season (36 episodes)
Orkizomai na eipo tin alitheia	1976	ERT	Comedy	1 season (26 episodes)
Oi atsides	1976	YENED	Comedy	1 season (5 episodes)
Mia Athinaia stin Athina	1976	ERT	Comedy	1 season (25 episodes)
I oraia Eleni ton gaidaron	1976	YENED	Satire	1 seasons (22 episodes)
Faros	1976	YENED	Drama	1 season (58 episodes)
Prasina stahya	1976	YENED	Drama	1 season (18 episodes)
Galini	1976–77	ERT	Drama	1 season (29 episodes)
Leshi mystiriou	1976–77	ERT	Mystery	2 seasons (30 episodes)
I megali peripeteia	1976–77	ERT	Drama	2 seasons (26 episodes)
Sta vimata tis elpidas	1976–77	YENED	Drama	1 season (8 episodes)
Athanates istories agapis	1976–77	YENED	Romantic	8 seasons (58 episodes)
Horis fovo kai pathos	1976–77	ERT	Comedy	1 season (52 episodes)
Apo tin kleidarotrypa	1976–77	YENED	Comedy	1 season (26 episodes)
Ekeines ki ego	1976-77	YENED	Comedy	2 seasons (86 episodes)
Ellinika paramythia	1976–77	YENED	Comedy	1 season (?? episodes)
Yungermann	1976–77	YENED	Drama	2 seasons (140 episodes)
En Athinais	1976–77	ERT	Drama	2 seasons (148 episodes)
Enas giatros anamesa mas	1976–81	YENED	Docu-series	5 season (250 episodes)
To taxidi	1976–81	YENED	Adventure	12 seasons (238 episodes)
Oi enohoi	1977	ERT	Thriller	1 season (14 episodes)
Efthymes istories	1977	ERT	Comedy	1 season (19 episodes)
Thomas epi Kolono	1977	ERT	Comedy	1 season (16 episodes)
Hamenos Paradeisos	1977	YENED	Drama	1 season (13 episodes)
O megalos xesikomos	1977	YENED	History	1 season (35 episodes)
O fotografos tou horiou	1977	ERT	Drama	1 season (16 episodes)
I theatrina	1977	ERT	Drama	1 season (33 episodes)
Istories horis dakrya	1977–78	ERT	Comedy	1 season (18 episodes)
Mia yperohi glossou	1977–78	ERT	Satire	1 season (17 episodes)
Porfyra kai aima	1977–78	YENED	History	1 season (54 episodes)
Ypopsies	1977–78	ERT	Drama	2 seasons (45 episodes)
Afroditi	1977–78	YENED	Romantic	1 seasons (28 episodes)
Oi Pantheoi	1977–79	ERT	Drama	2 seasons (100 episodes)
O taxitzis	1977–79	YENED	Drama	1 seasons (70 episodes)
Katadioxi	1977–79	YENED	Drama	2 seasons (45 episodes)
O dromos	1977–80	YENED	Drama	3 seasons (262 episodes)
Treis sto gyro	1978	YENED	Satire	1 season (7 episodes)
I tyhi tis Maroulas	1978	ERT	Comedy	1 season (13 episodes)
Theoi ston Olympo	1978	ERT	Comedy	1 season (7 episodes)
Fakelos 38	1978	ERT	Drama	1 season (12 episodes)
Egnatia odos	1978	YENED	Drama	1 season (9 episodes)
Erotas kai epanastasi	1978–79	ERT	History	1 season (45 episodes)
I leilasia mias zois	1978–79	ERT	Drama	1 season (20 episodes)
To lemonodasos	1978–79	ERT	Romantic	1 season (9 episodes)
I anadyomeni	1978–79	YENED	Romantic	1 seasons (16 episodes)
Naftikes istories	1978–79	YENED	Drama	1 seasons (72 episode)
I etymigoria	1978–80	YENED	Drama	3 seasons (111 episodes)
Syntagmatarhis Liapkin	1979	YENED	Drama	2 seasons (48 episodes)
Ekati	1979	ERT	Drama	1 season (13 episodes)
Tyheroi kai atyhoi	1979	YENED	Romantic	1 seasons (30 episodes)
Eisvoli apo allon planiti	1979	ERT	Science fiction	1 seasons (?? episodes)
Epistrofi stis Mykines	1979	ERT	Drama	1 seasons (6 episodes)
I daskala me ta hrysa matia	1979	ERT	Drama	1 seasons (14 episodes)
To paihnidi	1979	ERT	Drama	1 seasons (22 episodes)
Oi parastratimenoi	1979–80	ERT	Drama	1 season (20 episodes)
O symvolaiografos	1979–80	ERT	Drama	1 season (20 episodes)
Mystikoi arravones	1979–80	YENED	Romantic	1 season (38 episodes)
To imerologio enos thyrorou	1979–81	YENED	Comedy	3 seasons (190 episodes)

=== 1980–1989 ===
Title	Years	Channel	Genre	Notes
Gia tin timi kai to hrima	1980	YENED	Drama	1 season (13 episodes)
To minore tis avgis	1982–84	ERT1	Drama	2 seasons (27 episodes)
Giannis kai Maria	1982–83	ERT	Drama	2 seasons (13 episodes)
Chiliopodarousa	1983–87	ERT	Children	
Sto camping	1989	ET1	Comedy	1 season (13 episodes)
Oli i doxa...Oli i Hari	1989	ET1	Satire	1 season (8 episodes)
Athoos i enohos	1989	ET1	Drama	1 season (7 episodes)
Antiziles	1989	ET2	Drama	1 season (16 episodes)
Bios kai politeia	1989	ET2	Drama	1 season (13 episodes)
I diki tou mesimeriou	1989	ET2	Drama	1 season (5 episodes)
I ekti edoli	1989	ET2	Drama	1 season (13 episodes)
I parelasi	1989	ET1	Drama	1 season (13 episodes)
O Loysias	1989	ET1	Drama	1 season (5 episodes)
Ta kalytera mas Xronia	1989	ET1	Comedy	1 season (13 episodes)
Synomosia	1989	ET2	Drama	1 season (12 episodes)
To kanali twn paranomwn	1989	ET2	Drama	1 season (13 episodes)
Foitites	1989	ET3	Drama	1 season (13 episodes)
To synergeio	1989	ET1	Drama	1 season (13 episodes)
To feggari twn xenitemenwn	1989	ET2	Drama	1 season (6 episodes)
Fani	1989	ET1	Drama	1 season (9 episodes)
To hwrio ekpaidevetai	1989	ET2	Drama	1 season (13 episodes)
Staurosi xwris Anastasi	1989	ET1	Drama	1 season (27 episodes)
Ekeinos ki ekeinos	1989	ET2	Satire	1 season (13 episodes)
Theophilos	1989	ET1	Satire	1 season (4 episodes)
Kommatia kai thripsala	1989	ET2	Satire	1 season (8 episodes)
Mia volta sto feggari	1989	ET2	Satire	1 season (13 episodes)
Istories mystirioy kai fadasias	1989	ET2	Horror	1 season (6 episodes)
Oi Aggeloi kai egw	1989	ET2	Comedy	1 season (9 episodes)
Pagides tou Kalokairiou	1989	ET2	Thriller	1 season (8 episodes)
Poios irthe sto spiti mas apopse	1989	ET2	Thriller	1 season (8 episodes)
O Argonautis	1989	ET1	Comedy	1 season (12 episodes)
I Riki kai i Familia	1989	ET1	Comedy	1 season (10 episodes)

== Private television era (1989–present) ==
=== 1989–1994 ===
Title	Years	Channel	Genre	Notes
Oi Afthairetoi	1989–1990	Mega Channel	Comedy	The first television series of private television 2 seasons (66 episodes)
Mega Gelio	1989–1990	Mega Channel	Satire	1 season (?? episodes)
I Panselinos	1989–1990	ET2	Drama	1 season (16 episodes
Makedonika paramythia	1989–1990	ET3	Fantasy	1 season (13 episodes
Epikindini alitheia	1989–1990	ET2	Drama	1 season (18 episodes
Emmones idees	1989–1990	ET1	Drama	1 season (10 episodes)
VIDEO-grafies	1989–1990	Mega Channel	Satire	1 season (?? episodes)
Epitheorisi, epitheorisi	1989–1990	ET1	Satire	1 season (13 episodes)
Patir, yios kai pnevma	1989–1991	Mega Channel	Comedy	2 seasons (57 episodes)
Oi Treis Harites	1990–1992	Mega Channel	Comedy	
To Retire	1990–1992	Mega Channel	Comedy	
Lampsi	1991–2005	ANT1	Soap opera	
Oi Aparadektoi	1991–1993	Mega Channel	Comedy	
Oi Mikromesaioi	1992–1993	Mega Channel	Comedy	
Oi frouroi tis Achaias	1992–1993	Mega Channel	Drama	
Anastasia	1993–1994	Mega Channel	Drama	
Kalimera Zoi	1993–2006	ANT1	Drama	
Tis Ellados ta Paidia	1993–1995	ANT1	Comedy	
I Men... ke I Den	1993–1996	ANT1	Comedy	

=== 1995–1999 ===
Title	Years	Channel	Genre	Notes
Ntoltse Vita	1995–1997	Mega Channel	Comedy	
Ekeines Kai Ego	1996–1998	ANT1	Comedy	
Athina-Thessaloniki	1997–1998	ERT1	Drama	
I Agapi Argise mia Mera	1997–1998	ERT1	Drama	The most award-winning Greek TV series in Greek television awards (11 awards)
A.M.A.N.	1997–2000	Mega Channel, ANT1	Satire	
Kai oi Pantremenoi Ehoun Psyhi	1997–2000	ANT1	Comedy	
Dyo Xenoi	1997–1999	Mega Channel	Comedy	
I Aithousa tou Thronou	1998–1999	Mega Channel	Drama	
Eglimata	1998–2000	ANT1	Comedy	
Konstantinou kai Elenis	1998–2000	ANT1	Comedy	

=== 2000–2004 ===
Title	Years	Channel	Genre	Notes
Ti Psyhi Tha Paradoseis Mori?	2000	Mega Channel	Comedy	
Eisai to Tairi mou	2001–2002	Mega Channel	Comedy	
To kafe tis Charas	2003–2006	ANT1	Comedy	
Kaneis de leei s' agapo	2004–2005	Mega Channel	Drama comedy	
Savvatogennimenes	2004–2005	Mega Channel	Comedy	One of the best and most popular Greek TV series
S1ngles	2004–2008	Mega Channel	Drama comedy	
Vera sto Dexi	2004–2008	Mega Channel	Soap opera	

=== 2005–2009 ===
Title	Years	Channel	Genre	Notes
Erotas	2005–2008	Mega Channel	Soap opera	
Mov – Roz	2005–2006	ANT1	Drama	
Sto Para Pente	2005–2007	Mega Channel	Comedy; Drama; Mystery	One of the most popular Greek TV series
Peninta Peninta	2005–2007	Mega Channel	Comedy	
Mazi sou	2006–2007	Mega Channel	Drama	
Tis Agapis Maheria	2006–2007	Mega Channel	Drama	
Kodikas Da Mitsi	2006–2007	Alter Channel	Satire	
Coupling	2007–2008	ANT1	Drama comedy	
Eftyhismenoi Mazi	2007–2009	Mega Channel	Comedy	
Latremenoi Mou Geitones	2007–2009	Mega Channel	Comedy	
Maria, i Aschimi	2007–2009	Mega Channel	Soap opera	
The Ten	2007–2008	Alpha TV	Drama	The most award-winning Greek TV series in Greek television awards (11 awards)
Mavra Mesanychta	2008–2009	Mega Channel	Comedy	
I Polykatoikia	2008–2011	Mega Channel	Comedy	
Lola	2008–2009	ANT1	Comedy	
Karyotakis	2009	ERT1	Drama, Biography	

=== 2010–2019 ===
Title	Years	Channel	Genre	Notes
To Nisi	2010–2011	Mega Channel	Drama	The most expensive television series in Greek television.
Oi Vasiliades	2012–2014	Mega Channel	Comedy	
Brousko	2013–2017	ANT1	Soap opera	
The Biggest Game Show in the World (Greek TV series)	2013–2014	ANT1	Game Show	Greek version of the French game show Jeux sans frontières.
Tamam	2014–2017	ANT1	Comedy	Based on the German comedy series Türkisch für Anfänger.
Symmathites	2014–2017	ANT1	Comedy	Based on the Argentine soap opera Graduados.
To Soi Sou	2014–2019	Alpha TV	Comedy	One of the best Greek TV series, according to rating, with 5 seasons.
Min Arhizeis Ti Mourmoura	2013–2024	Alpha TV	Comedy	The longest-running Greek TV series.
Ela Sti Thesi Mou	2014–2021	Alpha TV	Comedy Soap opera	
Kati Chorismena Palikaria	2017–2018	ANT1	Comedy	
Peta Ti Friteza	2018–2020	ANT1	Comedy	
Min Psaronis	2018–2020	ANT1	Comedy	
Gynaika Horis Onoma	2018–2020	ANT1	Drama; Soap Opera	Based on the South Korean TV series Unknown Woman (TV series).
I Epistrofi	2018–2019	ANT1	Drama; Soap opera	
An Imoun Plousios	2019–2020	ANT1	Comedy; Soap opera	
Agries Melisses	2019–2022	ANT1	Drama; Soap opera	
8 lexis	2019–2021	Skai TV	Drama; Mystery; Soap opera	
Erotas Meta	2019–2020	Alpha TV	Drama; Mystery; Thriller; Soap opera	Based on the Argentine telenovela, Amar después de amar.
Tha Ginei Tis Polykatoikias	2019–2020	Skai TV	Comedy	
Logo Timis: 20 Hronia Meta	2019	Skai TV	Soap opera	

=== 2020–present ===
Title	Years	Channel	Genre	Mini Series	Notes
Aggeliki	2020–2021	Alpha TV	Drama; Soap opera	No	1 season, 154 episodes Based on the Chilean telenovela Amanda (Chilean TV series)
Parousiaste	2020–2021	ANT1 TV	Comedy	No	1 season, 60 episodes 27 years after its premiere, the iconic Greek comedy series of the 90's Tis Ellados ta Paidia, has been remade in a modern-day rendition!
I Familia	2020–2021	ANT1 TV	Comedy	No	1 season, 56 episodes
Ilios	2020–2022	ANT1 TV	Drama	No	2 seasons, 319 episodes Based on the French drama series Un si grand soleil.
Haireta mou ton Platano	2020–2023	ERT1	Comedy	No	3 seasons, 510 episodes Based on the Croatian comedy series, Kud puklo da puklo.
Ta Kalytera Mas Hronia	2020–2023	ERT1	Comedy; Drama	No	3 seasons, 170 episodes The story takes place around the Antonopoulos family in 1960s Athens. Angelos, the youngest child, narrates his own memories and significant historical events. From dictatorship to the golden years of PASOK in the 1980s! Based on the Spanish format, Cuéntame cómo pasó.
I Tourta Tis Mamas	2020–2022	ERT1	Comedy	No	2 seasons, 62 episodes
Exapsi	2021	MEGA Channel	Drama; Mystery	No	1 season,72 episodes
Shedon Enilikes	2021	MEGA Channel	Comedy	No	1 season, 12 episodes
Erotas me Diafora	2021–2022	Star Channel	Comedy; Romance	No	2 seasons, 26 episodes Based on the New Zealand romantic comedy series, Step Dave.
Zaketa Na Pareis	2021–2022	ERT1	Comedy	No	2 seasons, 38 episodes
Siopilos Dromos (Silent Road)	2021	MEGA Channel	Drama; Mystery; Thriller	Mini Series	1 season, ?? episodes
I Gi Tis Elias	2021–present	MEGA Channel	Drama; Mystery	No	4 seasons, ??? episodes
Sasmos	2021–present	Alpha TV	Drama	No	3 seasons, 496 episodes Based on Spiros Petroulakis' same titled novel.
Ase Mas Re Mama	2021–2022	Alpha TV	Comedy	No	1 season, 125 episodes
Psemata	2021–2022	Alpha TV	Drama; Crime; Thriller	Mini Series	1 season, 12 episodes
S' agapao men...alla	2021–2022	Open TV	Comedy	No	1 season, 50 episodes
I Teleftea Ora	2021–2022	Open TV	Drama	No	1 season, ?? episodes
To Avrio Mas Anikei	2021	MEGA Channel	Drama; Mystery	No	1 season, 70 episodes Based on the French mystery series Tomorrow Is Ours.
Komanda Kai Drakoi	2021–2022	MEGA Channel	Mystery; Science fiction	Mini Series	1 season, 13 episodes
Se Ksena Heria	2021–2022	ERT1	Comedy; Drama	No	1 season, 157 episodes
Vardianos Sta Sporka	2021	ERT1	Drama	Mini Series	1 season, 4 episodes Based on Alexandros Papadiamantis' same titled novel.
Kart Postal	2021	ERT1	Drama	Mini Series	1 season, 12 episodes A 12-episode mini series, narrating the story of Joseph, a British archaeologist located in Crete. Based on the novels of Victoria Hislop Cartes Postales from Greece and The Last Dance .
Sympetheroi Apo Ta Tirana	2021–2022	MEGA Channel	Comedy	No	1 season, 26 episodes The series is a TV adaptation of the same titled screenplay, written by Michalis Reppas and Thanasis Papathanasiou, who also contributed to the script.
Poios Iton o Foneus tou Adelfou mou	2021	ERT1	Drama	Mini Series	1 season, 4 episodes Based on Georgios Vizyinos' same titled novel.
Krisimes Stigmes	2021	ERT1	Drama	Mini Series	1 season, 4 episodes This four-episode series takes place during 1940's Athens and the Greek-German war. Based on Galateia Kazantzakis' same titled novel.
Agapi Paranomi	2022	ERT1	Drama	Mini Series	1 season, 6 episodes Set in Corfu in 1906, a story of criminal passion is being narrated in an oppressive patriarchal society. Based on the same titled novel by Konstantinos Theotokis.
Skoteini Thalassa	2022	MEGA Channel	Drama; Mystery; Thriller	No	1 season, 30 episodes Based on the Spanish thriller Presunto culpable (TV series).
Orkos	2022	ERT1	Drama; Crime	No	1 season, 36 episodes
Molis Xthes	2021–2022	Skai TV	Drama; Romance	No	1 season, 118 episodes Based on the Portuguese format Paixão (TV series) .
Kane Oti Koimasai (Act like you're asleep)	2022–2024	ERT1	Crime; Thriller	No	2 seasons, 128 episodes Winner of Best TV Series award on the Seoul International Drama Awards 2023.
Ta Noumera	2022–2023	ERT1	Comedy; Musical; Satire	No 1 season, 24 episodes	Singer-songwriter Fivos Delivorias, his attempt to provide a comedy, satire and musical hybrid and revive the legendary "Mandra of Attik", in a modern-day rendition.
Mia Nyhta tou Avgoustou	2022	ERT1	Drama	Mini Series	1 season, 14 episodes The sequel of the 2010 hit series, To Nisi, based on Victoria Hislop's latest book One August Night.
Floga kai Anemos	2022	ERT1	Drama	Mini Series	1 season, 12 episodes The dramatization of the love story between actress Kyveli Andrianou and Georgios Papandreou. Based on the same titled novel by Stefanos Dandolos.
Erotas Fygas	2022–2024	Open TV (September 2022-December 2023) ANT1 TV (January 2024-July 2024)	Drama	No	2 seasons, 290 episodes Based on the Turkish drama series Bir Zamanlar Çukurova (Bitter Lands) On year-end 2023, the series was discontinued by its broadcaster Open TV due to financial problems. In January 2024, it moved to ANT1 TV, providing a solution to the problem.
To Vrahioli tis Fotias	2023	ERT1	Drama; History	Mini Series	1 season, 8 episodes The story of the Cohen family, a Jewish family living in Thessaloniki. Based on the same titled novel by Veatriki Saias-Magrezou.
Storgi	2022–2023	Skai TV	Drama; Psychological; Thriller	No	1 season, 24 episodes Based on the Turkish psychological thriller series Kırmızı Oda.
Agria Gi	2022–2023	Skai TV	Drama; Soap Opera	No	1 season, 116 episodes Based on the Portuguese telenovela Terra Brava .
Glykanisos	2022–2023	Skai TV	Drama	No	1 season, 80 episodes
I Diki Mas Ikogeneia	2022–2023	Open TV	Comedy	No	1 season, ??? episodes Based on the Argentine comedy series Somos familia.
Mary, Mary, Mary	2022–2023	MEGA Channel	Comedy	No	1 season, ?? episodes
Maestro in Blue	2022–2024	MEGA Channel	Drama	No	3 seasons, 19 episodes The first Greek series to be distributed on Netflix .
Mavro Rodo	2022–2023	MEGA Channel	Drama	No	1 season, 140 episodes Based on the same titled novel by Eleni Kaplani.
O Paradeisos ton Kirion	2022–2024	Alpha TV	Drama; Soap opera	No	2 seasons, 325 episodes Based on the successful Italian series Il Paradiso delle Signore.
Afti i Nihta Menei	2022–2023	Alpha TV	Drama; Crime	No	1 season, 110 episodes Based on the same titled novel by Thanos Alexandris.
Pagidevmenoi	2022–2024	ANT1 TV	Drama; Romance	No	2 seasons, 146 episodes Based on the Turkish crime-romance series Yargı
Ektos Ipiresias	2022–2023	ANT1 TV	Comedy	No	1 season, ?? episodes Based on the Croatian comedy format Dar mar.
Poios Papadopoulos?	2022–2023	ANT1 TV	Comedy	No	1 season, 60 episodes Based on the Russian comedy format The Ivanovs vs. The Ivanovs.
Sose Me (Save Me)	2023	ANT1 TV	Drama; Romance	No	1 season, 8 episodes Along with Serres it has been the second Greek series that has been distributed to Netflix .
Serres	2022	ANT1 TV	Comedy	Mini Series	1 season, 10 episodes Along with Sose Me it has been the second Greek series that has been distributed to Netflix .
The Friend	2022	ANT1 TV	Drama; Crime	Mini Series	1 season, 10 episodes
I Gefyra	2023	ANT1 TV	Drama; Crime	Mini Series	1 season, 10 episodes
IQ 160	2023–present	Star Channel	Comedy; Action	No	2 seasons, ?? episodes Based on the French-Belgian action comedy series HPI (TV series).
I Paralia	2023–present	ERT1	Drama; Soap opera	No	2 seasons, ??? episodes Two worlds, a sea in between. Set in 1969, in Matala, Heraklion, Crete, young doctor Hypatia Archontaki, returns from London to announce her engagement with George to her parents. Season 2 takes place in 1975. Based on the novel by Penelope Kourtzi The Girl with the Snail.
Orkos II	2023–2024	ERT1	Drama; Crime	No	3 seasons, 33 episodes Season 1, 10 episodes Season 2, 10 episodes Season 3, 13 episodes Nominated for Best Picture and Best TV Series awards on the Seoul International Drama Awards 2023.
Tritos Orofos (3rd Floor)	2023	ERT1	Comedy; Soap Opera	No	1 season, 60 episodes (episode duration lasts 15 minutes) The story takes place on the third floor of an apartment building, where an elderly couple, John and Yvonne live in. They narrate, vent, complain about their own problems and face hilarious situations.
Sta Syrmata (Wired)	2023–2024	ERT1	Comedy	No	1 season, 25 episodes The story of Spyros Katarachias, who, after an economic scam, is sentenced to five years in prison and finds himself in a correctional facility.
Electra	2023–present	ERT1	Drama; Romance; Soap opera	No	2 seasons, ??? episodes The story of Electra, a woman trapped in the roles others chose for her, is suffocating in a narrow-minded island community. Based on the upcoming, same-titled novel of Eleni Kaplani. (due year-end 2023)
Erimi Hora (The Wilder)	2023–2025	ERT1	Crime; Western; Drama	No	2 seasons, 16 episodes (8 episodes per season) The story of Eva, an 11 year old girl comes to spotlight. Her grandfather, Loukas, chose to live as a hermit after the murder of his wife. Eva's custody is being examined after the loss of her parents on a car crash...
O Giatros	2023–present	Alpha TV	Drama; Thriller	No	2 seasons, 32 episodes The story of Andreas, a renowned doctor and pathologist, comes to life. Based on the successful Italian drama series Doc – Nelle tue mani. Inspired by real life events.
Famagusta	2024	MEGA Channel	Drama; History	No	3 seasons, 24 episodes (8 episodes per season) The story of a young couple, having lost their three-month old baby, forcing them to leave their place comes to life 50 years after the day of the Turkish invasion in Cyprus. Based on real-life events.
To Navagio	2023–2024	MEGA Channel	Drama	No	1 season, 116 episodes Based on Spiros Petroulakis' same titled novel, inspired by real life events.
I Magissa (The Witch)	2023–2024	ANT1 TV	Thriller; Fantasy	No	1 season, 75 episodes
Psyxokores	2023–2024	ANT1 TV	Drama; Social	No	3 seasons, 20 episodes each (all aired within the same year) Based on real-life events and testimonies, Psyxokores narrate the story of the four Polyzou sisters who, some years after the Greek Civil War, are forced by poverty to leave the countryside to go to the capital as "psyxokores" (a short of foster daughters, usual in Greece those days), after giving a promise to their dying mother that they will all stay together. Nevertheless, they are separated upon their arrival. Now, they must reunite, but first, survive. Nominated for Best TV series, Best Director and Best Screenwriter at the Seoul International Drama Awards 2024.
Sta Synora	2023–2024	Star Channel	Comedy	No	1 season, ?? episodes Based on the Croatian comedy series, Na granici (At the border).
17 Klostes	2023–2024	Cosmote TV MEGA Channel	Drama; Biography	Yes	1 season, 6 episodes The story takes place in Kythera, in 1909. On 22nd January 2024, the first episode aired on Cosmote TV. In November of the same year, MEGA Channel secured its television distribution rights, airing all six episodes. Based on the same titled novel by Panos Dimakis.
Grand Hotel	2024–present	ANT1 TV	Drama; Mystery	No	1 season, 160 episodes Based on the Spanish crime mystery series Gran Hotel (TV series)
VIP: Kala Geramata	2024–present	ANT1 TV	Comedy	No	1 season, ??? episodes
I Magissa: Flegomeni Kardia	2024–present	ANT1 TV	Thriller; Fantasy	No	1 season, ?? episodes Prequel to the 2023 Greek fantasy thriller series I Magissa (The Witch), the story takes place in the 18th century.
Diafani Agapi	2024–present	Alpha TV	Thriller; Drama; Crime	No	3 seasons, 32 episodes Season 1, 12 episodes Based on the Italian noir television series La porta rossa.
Agios Erotas	2024–present	Alpha TV	Drama; Romance; Soap opera	No	1 season, ?? episodes Based on the Chilean telenovela Perdona nuestros pecados.
I Katara tis Tzelas Delafragka	2024–present	Alpha TV	Comedy; Musical; Satire	No	1 season, 14 episodes The series is a TV adaptation sequel of the 2001 Greek comedy musical To Klama Vgike ap' ton Paradiso, created by Michalis Reppas and Thanasis Papathanasiou.
Na me les mama	2024–2025	Alpha TV	Crime; Thriller; Psychological	Mini Series	1 season, 8 episodes Based on the South Korean drama, Mother (South Korean TV series).
Porto Leone	2025	Alpha TV	Drama	No	1 season, ??? episodes
Archelaou 5	2024–2025	ERT1	Comedy	No	1 season, 80 episodes
I Maria Pou Egine Kallas	2024	ERT1	Biography; Drama	Mini Series	1 season, 10 episodes
To Dichty	2024–present	ERT1	Action; Crime; Thriller	No	2 seasons, ?? episodes (6 episodes per season) This marks Manousos Manousakis' last directorial effort. Season 2 is to be directed by Grigoris Karantinakis.
To Aparetito Fos	2025	ERT1	Drama; Romance	Mini Series	1 season, 10 episodes Based on the same titled novel by Dorina Papaliou.
Mavroi Pinakes	2024	Star Channel	Crime; Noir; Thriller; Mystery	Mini Series	1 season, 10 episodes The story takes place in Lefkes, a small suburban town. Isabella, the teenage daughter of the town mayor ends up murdered in the deep woods. Its thematology is inspired by the Black Paintings, painted by Spanish painter Francisco Goya during his late years.
