= Prosopa Greek Television Awards =

The "Prosopa" Greek Television Awards were annual awards about the Greek television. They were the only notable awards in the history of Greek television, since they lasted thirteen years, covering the most successful period of the Greek television. They began in 1997, organised by TV Ethnos, a magazine issued by the Greek newspaper Ethnos. The last awards were given in 2009. The next years the awards stopped because the productions of Greek television were limited due to Greek debt crisis. The last years the awards were sponsored by telecommunications company WIND Hellas.

The awards included many categories such as best production, best drama series, best comedy series, best actor, best actress, best screenplay, best director, best journalist, best news reader as well as special awards for people with important presence in Greek arts. Many important personalities from the Greek cinema and television have been honoured such as Thanasis Veggos, Alekos Alexandrakis and others.

== Hosts ==
Season	Host(s)	TV Broadcast
1997		ET1
1998	Roula Koromila	ET1
1999	Roula Koromila	ET1
2000	Terence Quick	ET1
2001		ET1
2002	Rika Vagiani & Popi Tsapanidou	ET1
2003		
2004		
2005	Fotis Sergoulopoulos & Maria Bakodimou	Mega Channel
2006	Eleni Menegaki	Alpha TV
2007	Eleni Menegaki	NET
2008	Christina Lambiri	Star Channel
2009	Christos Ferentinos	ET1
2010	Christos Ferentinos	ET1

== Best TV Series Director ==
Season	Best Director	Sources
1996–97	Nikos Koutelidakis for Prodosia	
1997–98	Kostas Koutsomytis for I Agapi Argise mia Mera	
1998–99	Pigi Dimitrakopoulou for I Aithousa tou Thronou	
1999–00	Giorgos Panousopoulos, Nikos Papathanasiou, Pantelis Voulgaris for Agion Oros-Santorini-Sounion	
2000–01	Reina Eskenazy for Peri Anemon kai Idaton	
2001–02	Yiula Zoiopoulou for Kato ap' tin Akropoli	
2002–03	Panos Kokkinopoulos for Ah kai na Xeres	
2003–04	Giorgos Sougias, Christoforos Papakaliatis for Kleise ta Matia	
2004–05	Kostas Koutsomytis for Ta Paidia tis Niovis	
2005–06	Panos Kokkinopoulos for Dekati Entoli	
2006–07	Antonis Angelopoulos for Sto Para Pente	
2007–08	Pigi Dimitrakopoulou for To Deka	
2008–09	Kostas Koutsomytis for Matomena Homata	

== Best TV Series Screenplay ==
Season	Best Original/Drama Screenplay	Best Comedy Screenplay	Best Adapted Screenplay
1996–97	Mirella Papaeconomou for Logo Timis		
1997–98	Kostas Koutsomitis for I Agapi Argise mia Mera		
1998–99	Mirella Papaeconomou for I Zoi pou Den Ezisa	Kakia Igerinou for Vios Anthospartos	Kakia Igerinou, Panos Kokkinopoulos for Nyhterino Deltio
1999–00	Giannis Tziotis for Vizyinos	Lefteris Kaponis for To Kleidi	Nikos Apeiranthitis for Anishira Psevdi
2000–01	Katerina Marinaki for Taxim	Nikos Mouratidis for Papoudes en Drasei	Dimitra Papadopoulou for S'agapo m'agapas
2001–02	Kakia Igerinou for Peri Anemon kai Ydaton	Lefteris Papapetrou for Eisai to Tairi mou	Kostas Koutsomitis, V. Mavropoulos for Treis Hires
2002–03	Christoforos Papakaliatis for Kleise ta Matia	Apostolis Tsaousoglou for Ah kai na xeres	Giannis Tziotis for Astheneis kai Odoiporoi
2003–04	Elena Akrita, Giorgos Kyritsis for Me Thea sto Pelagos	Giorgos Kapoutzidis for Savvatoggennimenes	Kakia Kissonergi for Epta Thanasimes Petheres
2004–05		Panos Amarantidis for I Ora i Kali	
2005–06		Giorgos Kapoutzidis for Sto Para Pente	
2006–07	Giorgos Feidas for Singles 2	Giorgos Kapoutzidis for Sto Para Pente	Stella Vasilantonaki for Istories toy Astynomou Mpeka
2007–08		Myrto Kontova for Yperoha Plasmata	Stavros Kalafatides, Mary Zafeiropoulou for To Deka
2008–09	Nikos Apeiranthitis for Matomena Homata	Rena Gkika for Eftyhismenoi Mazi	

== Best Series ==
Season	Best Drama Series	Best Comedy Series
1996–97	Logo Timis and Vammenos Ilios	Dolce Vita
1997–98	Psithiroi Kardias	Dyo Xenoi
1998–99	I Aithousa tou Thronou	Kai oi pantremenoi exoun psixi
1999–00	Ystera irthan oi Melisses	Egklimata
2000–01	Na Me Proseheis	Pappoudes En Drasei
2001–02		Eisai to Tairi mou
2002–03	Kleise ta Matia	Akros Oikogeneiakon
2003–04	Leni	Savvatogennimenes
2004–05	Etsi Ksafnika	I ora I Kali
2005–06		Sto Para Pente
2006–07		
2007–08	To Deka	Eftyhismenoi Mazi
2008–09	Karyotakis	Mavra Mesanyhta

== Best TV Series Actor ==
Season	Best Actor
1996–97	Kostas Rigopoulos for O Yios tou Patera
1997–98	Nikos Sergianopoulos for Dyo Xenoi
1998–99	Minas Hatzisavvas for Nyhterino Deltio
1999–00	Antonis Theodorakopoulos for Vizyinos
2000–01	Thanasis Veggos for Peri Anemon kai Idaton
2001–02	Sotiris Moustakas for Ta Haidemena Paidia
2002–03	Giannis Bezos for Akros oikogeneiakon
2003–04	Giorgos Michalakopoulos for Me Thea sto Pelago
2004–05	Konstantinos Markoulakis for Etsi Xafnika
2005–06	Petros Filippidis for 50-50
2006–07	Petros Filippidis for 50-50
2007–08	Dimitris Kataleifos for To Deka
2008–09	Giannis Bezos for Eftyhismenoi Mazi, Dimosthenis Papadopoulos for Karyotakis

== Best TV Series Actress ==
Season	Best Actress
1996–97	Olia Lazaridou for Prodosia
1997–98	Karyofillia Karampeti for I Agapi Argise mia Mera
1998–99	Themis Bazaka for Dyo Adelfes
1999–00	Dimitra hatoupi for Anishira Psevdi
2000–01	Despoina Bebedeli for Peri Anemon kai Idaton
2001–02	Antigoni Valakou for Peri Anemon kai Idaton
2002–03	Smaragda Karydi for Ah kai na Xeres
2003–04	Eleni Rantou for Savvatogennimenes
2004–05	Gogo Brebou for Sto fos tou Feggariou
2005–06	Smaragda Karydi for Sto Para Pente
2006–07	Smaragda Karydi for Sto Para Pente
2007–08	Renni Pitakki for To Deka
2008–09	Panagioti Vlanti for Mavra Mesanyhta, Maria Kavgianni for I Hara Agnoeitai

== Best TV Series Supporting Actor ==
Season	Best Supporting Actor
1996–97	Ilias Logothetis for O Yios tou Patera
1997–98	Giorgos Moshidis for I Agapi Argise mia Mera
1998–99	Giorgos Michalakopoulos for O Megalos Thymos
1999–00	Dimitris Lignadis for O Ioudas Filouse Iperoha
2000–01	Alekos Alexandrakis for Na me Proseheis
2001–02	Aris Servetalis for Eisai to Tairi mou
2002–03	Paschalis Tsarouhas for I Agapi irthe apo makria
2003–04	Thanassis Veggos for Erotas opos Erimos
2004–05	Pavlos Kontogiannidis for Vera sto Dexi
2005–06	Giorgos Moshidis for Sto Para Pente
2006–07	Pygmalion Dadakaridis for 50-50, Antonis Loudaros for Entimotatoi Keratades
2007–08	Vassilis Haralampopoulos for To Deka
2008–09	Gerasimos Skiadaresis for Mavra Mesanyhta

== Best TV Series Supporting Actress ==
Season	Best Supporting Actress
1996–97	Betty Livanou for Vammenos Ilios
1997–98	Afroditi Grigoriadou for I Agapi Argise mia Mera
1998–99	Despoina Bebedeli for Vios Anthospartos
1999–00	Pegky Trikalioti for Vizyinos
2000–01	Ntina Konsta for San Heimoniatiki Liakada
2001–02	Soula Athanasiadou for Votka Portokali
2002–03	Chrysoula Diavati for Oi Stavloi tis Erietas Zaimi
2003–04	Theofania Papathoma for Akrovatontas
2004–05	Erietta Moutoussi for Erastis Dytikon Proastion
2005–06	Efi Papatheodorou for Sto Para Pente
2006–07	Efi Papatheodorou for Sto Para Pente
2007–08	Martha Vourtsi for Enas Minas kai Kati
2008–09	Anna Synodinou for Matomena Homata

== Best TV Series Best Music ==
Season	Best Music
1996–97	Dimitris Papadimitriou for Logo Timis
1997–98	Christos Nikolopoulos for Psythiroi Kardias
1998–99	Marios Tokas for Vios Anthospartos
1999–00	Stamatis Kraounakis for Ystera Irthan oi Melisses
2000–01	Dimitra Galani for Taxim
2001–02	Nikos Antypas for Kato Ap' tin Akropoli
2002–03	Alkistis Protopsalti for Kleise ta matia
2003–04	Stamatis Kraounakis for Epta Thanasimes Peheres
2004–05	Christos Papadopoulos for Archipelagos
2005–06	Michalis Hatzigiannis for Kinoumeni Ammos
2006–07	Stamatis Kraounakis for Maria i Ashimi
2007–08	Eleni Karaindrou for To Deka
2008–09	Michalis Hatzigiannis for Polykatoikia

== Best Children's Show ==
Season	Best Children's Show
1999–00	Phaidon Sofianos for Disney Club
2004–05	Christos Demopoulos for Rainbow
2007–08	Christos Demopoulos for Rainbow

== Best Satirical Show ==
Season	Best Satirical Show
2001–02	Giorgos Mitsikostas for Mitsi-Hosta
2002-03	Giorgos Mitsikostas for Mitsi-Hosta
2004–05	Giorgos Mitsikostas for Mitsi-Hosta
2007–08	Apostolis Mparmpagiannis for Ellinofreneia
