= Kostas Koutsomytis =

Greek film director and screenwriter

- Κώστας Κουτσομύτης
- Born: 20 September 1938; Grevena, Greece
- Died: 10 March 2016 (aged 77); Athens, Greece
- Occupation(s): Film director, screenwriter

Kostas Koutsomytis (Greek: Κώστας Κουτσομύτης, 20 September 1938 – 10 March 2016) was a Greek film director and screenwriter who worked mostly in television.

== Biography ==
Koutsomytis was born in Grevena.

He directed his first movie in 1965, a short film named To Domatio. In television he debuted in 1971, directing the series Agnostos Polemos that was aired in Greek State Television. He directed some of the most successful series in the Greek television such as Vammena Kokkina Mallia, Prova Nyfikou, I Agapi Argise mia Mera etc. He won one cinema award for the film Kloios (best screenplay) and three Greek television awards for the series I Agapi Argise mia Mera, Ta Paidia tis Niovis and Matomena Homata. His series are usually based in the novels of famous Greek writers such as Dido Sotiriou, Lili Zografou, Dora Giannakopoulou, Giannis Xanthoulis and others.

Koutsomytis died on 10 March 2016 in Sismanoglio in Athens.

== Filmography ==
=== Cinema ===
Title	Year
Athina Zafeiropetra	1985
Kloios	1987

=== Television ===
Title	Year	Channel	Notes
O Agnostos Polemos	1971	YENED	
Paraxenos taxidiotis	1972		
Horis Anasa	1973		
Tereza Varma Dakosta	1975		
En Athinais	1976		
Oi Enohoi	1977		
Kontra ston Anemo	1980	ΕΡΤ	
O Katadikos	1983	ΕΡΤ	
Kapnismenos Ouranos	1985	ΕΡΤ	
Enas filisyhos anthropos	1988	ΕΡΤ	
Ekeinos ki ekeinos	1989	ΕΡΤ	
O Kitrinos Fakelos	1991	ANT1	
Vammena Kokkina Mallia	1992	ANT1	
I Ektelesi	1993		
I Prova Nyfikou	1995	ANT1	Writer of adapted screenplay
I Agapi Argise mia Mera	1997	ΕΡΤ	Writer of adapted screenplay
O Megalos Thymos	1998	Mega Channel	
Istera Irthan oi Melisses	2000	ΕΡΤ	Writer of adapted screenplay
Treis Hires	2001		
Ta Paidia tis Niovis	2004	ΕΡΤ	
Oi Μagisses tis Smirnis	2005	Mega Channel	
Tyflomyga	2007	Alpha TV	
Matomena Homata	2009	Alpha TV	
