= Sakalis =

Sakalis is a Greek surname (Σακαλής). Notable people with the surname include:

- Sofia Sakalis, Australian soccer player
- Roni Sakalis, alias of Rony Seikaly, Lebanese-American basketball player, while he was playing in Greece
- Dimitra Sakalis, Greek screenwriter, e.g., of Mavra Mesanychta
- Georgios Sakalis, Minister of State (Greece) in exile (1944)
