= The 10 (TV series) =

Greek TV series

- Genre: Drama
- Written by: M. Karagatsis
- Directed by: Pigi Dimitrakopoulou
- Starring: Dimitris Kataleifos, Maria Zorba, Reni Pittaki, Maria Protopappa, Sotiris Hatzakis, Alexandros Logothetis, Maria Nafpliotou, Vassilis Charalampopoulos, Thaleia Matika, Elisavet Naslidou, Marissa Triandafyllidou, Errikos Litsis, Dimitris Imellos
- Country of origin: Greece
- Original language: Greek
- No. of seasons: 1
- No. of episodes: 18

Production
- Production locations: Athens, Greece
- Running time: 45 min

Original release
- Network: Alpha TV
- Release: 2007 – 2008

The 10 was a Greek TV series that was aired in 2007-08 season by Alpha TV. The screenplay was based in the novel "The 10" written by M. Karagatsis and was directed by Pigi Dimitrakopoulou. The adapted screenplay was written by Stavros Kalafatidis, Mary Zafeiropoulou and Giorgos Kritikos. The series star Dimitris Kataleifos, Maria Zorba, Reni Pittaki, Maria Nafpliotou, Alexandros Logothetis, Thaleia Matika, Vassilis Charalampopoulos and others. The series won 11 television awards in "Prosopa" Greek Television Awards.

== Plot ==
The series follows the novel and presents as main characters the tenants of an old block of flats near Piraeus, during 1950s. The owner of the block is a rich man, named Kalogeras. His nephew is a tenant of the block and he hopes to be his heir. The series also focuses to a lot of other characters from the neighbourhood near the block of flats or other persons related with the main characters.

== Cast ==
- Dimitris Kataleifos
- Maria Zorba
- Reni Pittaki
- Maria Protopappa
- Sotiris Hatzakis
- Alexandros Logothetis
- Maria Nafpliotou
- Vassilis Charalampopoulos
- Thaleia Matika
- Elisavet Naslidou
- Marissa Triandafyllidou
- Errikos Litsis
- Dimitris Imellos

== Awards ==
The series won 11 television awards in "Prosopa" Greek Television Awards:

List of awards and nominations
Award	Category	Recipients and nominees	Result
Prosopa 2008	Best Production		Won
Prosopa 2008	Best Director	Pigi Dimitrakopoulou	Won
Prosopa 2008	Best Drama Series	Pigi Dimitrakopoulou	Won
Prosopa 2008	Best Adapted Screenplay	Stavros Kalafatidis, Mary Zafeiropoulou and Giorgos Kritikos	Won
Prosopa 2008	Best Actor	Dimitris Kataleifos	Won
Prosopa 2008	Best Actress	Reni Pittaki	Won
Prosopa 2008	Best Supporting Actor	Vassilis Charalampopoulos	Won
Prosopa 2008	Best Music	Eleni Karaindrou	Won
Prosopa 2008	Best Costumes Design	Maria Kontodima	Won
Prosopa 2008	Best Production Design	Kostas Pappas	Won
Prosopa 2008	Best Editing	Stella Filippopoulou	Won

== See also ==
- The 10 (novel)
