= Karyotakis (TV series) =

- Directed by: Tassos Psarras
- Starring: Dimosthenis Papadopoulos, Maria Kitsou, Ilias Logothetis, Giorgos Armenis, Dimitris Imellos
- Country of origin: Greece
- Original language: Greek
- No. of seasons: 1

Production
- Running time: 45 minutes

Original release
- Network: ERT1
- Release: January 2009 – June 2009

Karyotakis is a Greek television series that was aired by ET1 in 2009. The series was directed by Tassos Psarras and it stars Demosthenis Papadopoulos and Maria Kitsiou. It is a biographical series about the life of the Greek poet Kostas Karyotakis. It won 4 awards in Greek television awards and it is considered one of the best Greek television productions.

== Plot ==
The series is a biography about the life of the Greek poet Kostas Karyotakis. The series follows his life from his childhood to his death. It focuses in his artistic and political action as well as in his relationship with the poet Maria Polydouri. Through to Karyotakis' life the series presents the turbulent period of the interwar Greek history.

== Cast ==
- Dimosthenis Papadopoulos
- Maria Kitsou
- Ilias Logothetis
- Giorgos Armenis
- Dimitris Imellos
- Manos Vakousis
- Stefania Goulioti
- Kora Karvouni
- Errikos Litsis

== Awards ==
The series won 4 television awards in "Prosopa" Greek Television Awards:

List of awards and nominations
Award	Category	Recipients and nominees	Result
Prosopa 2009	Best Drama Series	Tassos Psarras	Won
Prosopa 2009	Best Male Actor	Demosthenis Papadopoulos	Won
Prosopa 2009	Best Cinematography	Giorgos Argyroiliopoulos	Won
Prosopa 2009	Best Production Design	Voula Zoeopoulou	Won
