= Maria Polydouri =

Greek poet

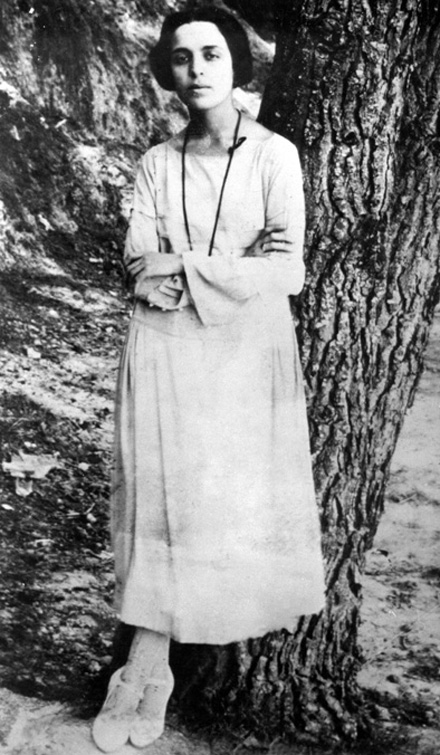
- Polydouri in 1920.
- Native name: Μαρία Πολυδούρη
- Born: 1 April 1902 Kalamata, Kingdom of Greece
- Died: 29 April 1930 (aged 28) Athens, Greece
- Occupation: Poet, theatrical actress, dressmaker
- Language: Greek
- Education: University of Athens (no degree)
- Literary movement: Neo-romanticism

Maria Polydouri (Greek: Μαρία Πολυδούρη [poliˈðuri]; 1 April 1902 – 29 April 1930) was a Greek poet who belonged to the school of Neo-romanticism.

== Life ==
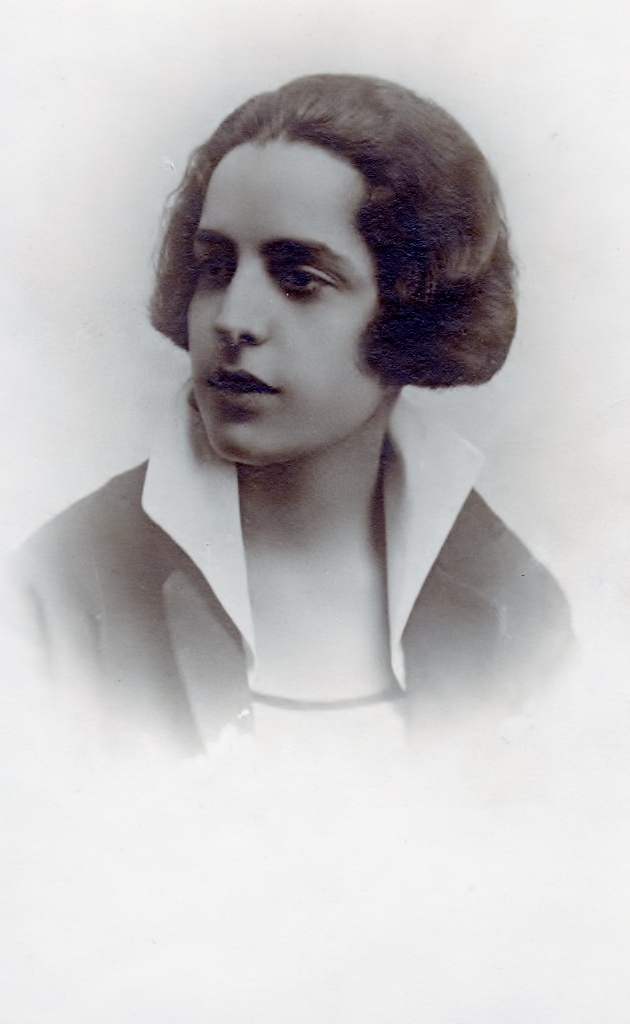
Polydouri in 1918

Polydouri was born in Kalamata. She was the daughter of the philologist Eugene Polydouris and Kyriaki Markatou, a woman with early feminist beliefs. She completed her high school studies in Kalamata, and had also gone to school in Gytheio and Filiatra, as well as in Arsakeio in Athens for two years. She was a contemporary of Kostas Karyotakis, with whom she had a desperate but incomplete love affair. Although she wrote poetry from an early age, her most important poems were written during the last four years of her life, when, suffering from tuberculosis, she was secluded in an Athens Sanatorium, where she died in 1930.

=== Literary debut in her teen years ===
She first appeared in the Literary world at age 14 with the prose poem The Pain of the Mother , which refers to the death of a sailor who was washed up on the shores of Filiatra and is influenced by the lamentations heard in the Mani Peninsula. At sixteen, she was appointed to the Prefecture of Messenia and also expressed keen interest in The woman question. In 1920, during the time period of forty days, both her parents died.

=== Legal studies and romantic relationship with Karyotakis ===
In 1921, she was transferred to the Prefecture of Athens while enrolled at the Law School of the University of Athens. Kostas Karyotakis, a fellow poet of the time, was working at the same service sector. After their encounter, a fierce love developed, which did not last long but decisively influenced her life and work.

They first met in January 1922. Polydouri was then 20 years old, while Karyotakis was 26. She had published some juvenilia poems while he had published two poetry collections – The pain of Men and things (1919) and Nepenthe (1921) – and had already won the respect of some critics and fellow-craftsmen.

In the summer of 1922, Karyotakis discovered that he suffered from syphilis, a disease that was incurable and bore social stigma. He immediately informed Polydouri about this and asked her to end their relationship. She proposed to marry without having children, but he was too proud to accept the sacrifice. Maria doubted his sincerity and felt that his illness was a pretext to leave her.

=== Engagement to Georgiou and work as a theatrical actress ===
In 1924, she met Aristotelis Georgiou, a lawyer who had just returned from Paris. Polydouri got engaged to him in early 1925.

Despite the dedication to her fiancé, Polydouri could not concentrate seriously in any activity. She lost her job in the public sector after repeated absences and dropped out of Law School. She studied at the Kounallaki Drama School and even managed to appear as an actress in a play, "The Little Rag", for which she had the lead role.

=== Dressmaking studies in Paris, tuberculosis, and publishing her works while hospitalized ===
In the summer of 1926, she broke off her engagement and left for Paris. She studied dressmaking but could not work because she contracted tuberculosis. She returned to Athens in 1928 and was hospitalized at Sotiria Hospital, where she learned about the suicide of her former lover, Kostas Karyotakis. In the same year, she released her first poetry collection The Chirps that faint and in 1929 the second, Echo over chaos. Polydouri left two prose works, her diary and an untitled novel in which she attacked the conservatism and hypocrisy of the time. She died of tuberculosis on the morning of 29 April 1930, after a series of morphine injections that were given to her by a friend in Christomanos Clinic.

== Work ==
Maria Polydouri belongs to the generation of 1920, which fostered the feeling of dissatisfaction and decline. Love and death are the two axes around which her poetry revolves. Her poetry is a concise source of lyricism that breaks in deep sorrow and sometimes grief, with obvious influences from the love of her life, Kostas Karyotakis, but also laments from Mani. Polydouri's affective and emotional exacerbations often cover some technical weaknesses and songwriting amenities.

Critic and poet Kostas Stergiopoulos wrote:

"Maria Polydouri used to write her poems as if she was writing her personal diary. The transmutation happened automatically and effortlessly. To Polydouri, expression meant straight transcribing from the events occurring in her emotional world to the poetic language with all the idealizations and exaggerations her romantic nature dictated to her".

The first article about Maria Polydouri based on her archives and diary belongs to Vasiliki Bobou-Stamati and is published in Elliniki Dimiourgia (1954), p. 617-624. The Collected Works of Maria Polydouri released for the first time in the 1960s by Estia Press, curated by Lili Zografou. Since then they have been republished by various publishers. The writer and poet Kostis Gimossoulis has written a fictional biography titled "Raining light". Her poems have been set to music by Greek composers, classical artists and rock – including Menelaos Palladio, Kostis Kritsotakis, Nikos Mamangakis, Yiannis Spanos, Notis Mavroudis, George Arkomanis, Dimitris Papadimitriou, Michalis Koumbios, Stelios Botonakis and band "Plinthetes" and " Iliodromio "and the composer Nikos Fylaktos with voice and piano.

In 2009, she was portrayed by Maria Kitsiou in the Greek TV series Karyotakis, aired by ERT1.

== Works ==
Collections:

- The chirps that faint (1928)
- Echo over chaos (1929)

Her poems (or at least a part of them) have been translated to Bulgarian, Catalan, Dutch, German, French, Italian, Macedonian, Romanian, Spanish and Swedish.
