= I Aithousa tou Thronou =

- Genre: Drama
- Based on: I Aithousa tou Thronou by Tasos Athanasiadis
- Directed by: Pigi Dimitrakopoulou
- Starring: Aris Lempesopoulos, Maria Nafpliotou , Alekos Syssovitis
- Country of origin: Greece
- Original language: Greek
- No. of seasons: 1
- No. of episodes: 26

Production
- Production locations: Athens, Greece
- Running time: 45 min

Original release
- Network: Mega Channel
- Release: 1998 – 1999

I Aithousa tou thronou (the throne room) is a Greek drama TV series, aired in the season 1998-99 by Mega Channel. It is based on the novel of Tasos Athanasiadis and it is directed by Pigi Dimitrakopoulou. The series was one of the most expensive production in the Greek television. It stars Aris Lempesopoulos, Maria Nafpliotou, Myrto Alikaki, Dimitris Lignadis. The series it was the last role of the important Greek actor Nikos Rizos. The scenes of series was shot in Syros and Attica. I Aithousa tou Thronou won the best Drama series award and the best director award, in the Greek television awards for the period 1998-99.

== Plot ==
A son of a powerful family of a Greek island comes back from a monastery and decides to enter politics. On the island he meets the daughter of a Greek resistance fighter who died during the Greek resistance against German and Italian occupation. The two young people get to know each other and gradually fall in love.

== Cast ==
- Aris Lempesopoulos
- Maria Naupliotou
- Alekos Sissovitis
- Myrto Alikaki
- Alekos Sissovitis
- Dimitris Lignadis
- Nikos Rizos
- Alekos Alexandrakis
