= 1968 (film) =

- Directed by: Tassos Boulmetis
- Story by: Tassos Boulmetis
- Produced by: Makis Angelopoulos
- Starring: Ieroklis Michailidis; Antonis Kafetzopoulos; Giorgos Mitsikostas; Stelios Mainas; Manolis Mavromatakis; Vasiliki Troufakou; Giannis Vouros; Christos Dimas; Orfeas Avgoustidis; Themis Panou; Taxiarchis Chanos; Alexandros Zouridakis; Antonis Antoniou; Errikos Litsis; Thodoris Katsafados; Giorgos Souxes; Alexis Agrafiadis; Alexandros Amerikanos; Alexandros Moukanos; Maria Antoulinaki; Dimitris Mavropoulos; Maria Antoulinaki
- Edited by: Lampis Charalambidis
- Music by: Evanthia Repoutsika
- Distributed by: Feelgood Entertainment
- Release date: 25 January 2018 (Athens)
- Running time: 94 minutes
- Country: Greece
- Language: Greek
- Box office: $853,512

1968 is a 2018 historical-sports docudrama film directed by Tassos Boulmetis.

== Plot ==
April 4, 1968. The Panathenaic Stadium (then Olympic Stadium of Athens) is abuzz, with thousands of people gathered and millions listening through their radios. The FIBA European Cup Winners' Cup final between AEK B.C. – Slavia VŠ Praha has just begun and is attended by 80,000 spectators, the Guinness World Record attendance for a basketball event.

A girl in love is dreaming of her wedding day, while the future husband becomes more desperate with every Greek ball going through the hoop. An elderly husband and wife remember the home they left behind. A young communist prisoner cheers from his jail cell and a PROPO betting shop becomes the place where old and new wounds resurface.

Years before this night, three Constantinopolitans seeing Greek refugees from Constantinople arriving in Athens as part of the population exchange between Greece and Turkey following the Greco-Turkish War (1919–1922) decided to create an athletic union, eventually named AEK, that will tell their story. At the end of this night, Greek history will have changed forever.

== Cast ==
- Ieroklis Michailidis as the maestro
- Antonis Kafetzopoulos as a Greek from Constantinople
- Giorgos Mitsikostas as a PROPO betting shop owner
- Stelios Mainas as the passenger
- Manolis Mavromatakis as bus officer
- Vasiliki Troufakou as Varvara
- Giannis Vouros
- Christos Dimas
- Orfeas Avgoustidis as Thanasis
- Themis Panou as the doctor
- Taxiarchis Chanos as a prison guard
- Alexandros Zouridakis as a prison guard
- Antonis Antoniou as the funeral home operator
- Errikos Litsis as the informer
- Thodoris Katsafados as Varvara's father
- Giorgos Souxes as a Greek from Constantinople
- Alexis Agrafiadis as a Greek from Constantinople
- Alexandros Amerikanos as Giorgos Amerikanos: Captain of AEK
- Alexandros Moukanos as the prisoner's father
- Maria Antoulinaki as Varvara's mother
- Antonis Kyriakidis as Lakis Tsavas
- Petra Mavridi as a schoolgirl
- Vasilis Georgiou as himself: Radio broadcaster of the event
- Christos Zoupas as himself: Former AEK player
- Nikos Milas as himself: Former AEK manager
- Lakis Tsavas as himself: Former AEK player
- Nikos Nesiadis as himself: Former AEK player
- Stelios Vasileiadis as himself: Former AEK player
- Eas Larentzakis as himself: Former AEK player
- Georgios Trontzos as himself: Former AEK player
- Petros Petrakis as himself: Former AEK player
- Jiří Zídek Sr. as himself: Former Slavia Praha player
- Jiří Růžička as himself: Former Slavia Praha player
- Bohumil Tomášek as himself: Former Slavia Praha player
- Kyriakos Chinas as himself
- Nikolaos Ouzounoglou as himself
- Ntinos Belalidis as himself: Chairman of Kurtuluş S.K.
- Pepi Amerikanou as herself: Wife of former AEK captain Giorgos Amerikanos
- Gitsa Christea as herself: Wife of former AEK player Antonis Christeas
- Aristidis Kamaras as himself: Event spectator and former Panathinaikos F.C. footballer
- Giannis Ioannidis as himself: Event spectator and former AEK manager
- Theodoros Vamvakousis as himself: Event spectator and former Olympiacos B.C. player
- Ntinos Panagidis as himself: Event spectator
- Michalis Poulantzas as himself: Former AEK player

== Release ==
The film was released in cinemas on January 25, 2018 by Feelgood Entertainment and opened number one at the Greek box office.

The film went to gross $853,512 at the Greek box office, making it the 24th highest grossing 2018 film in Greece.

== Awards ==
Awards and nominations received by The Godfather
Award	Category	Nominee	Result	Ref.
Hellenic Film Academy Awards	Best Sound	Dimitris Athanasopoulos; Christos Goussios; Kostas Varympopiotis	Won	
Hellenic Film Academy Awards	Best Director	Tassos Boulmetis	Nominated	
Hellenic Film Academy Awards	Best Special Effects and Cinematic Innovation	Giannis Georgariou; Alexis Paraschos	Nominated	
Hellenic Film Academy Awards	Best Costume Design	Daphne Koliva; Evelyna Darzenta	Nominated	
Hellenic Film Academy Awards	Best Film	Makis Angelopoulos; Tassos Boulmetis	Nominated	
Los Angeles Greek Film Festival (LAGFF); Orpheus Award	Audience Award	Tassos Boulmetis	Won	
Los Angeles Greek Film Festival (LAGFF); Orpheus Award	Special Jury Award	Tassos Boulmetis	Won	
Los Angeles Greek Film Festival (LAGFF); Orpheus Award	Best Documentary Film	Tassos Boulmetis	Nominated	
