= Maria Nafpliotou =

Greek actress

- Nafpliotou in 2026
- Born: 19 June 1969 (age 57); Athens, Greece
- Occupation: Actress
- Years active: 1994-present

Maria Nafpliotou (born 19 June 1969) is a Greek actress. In addition to lead roles in Greek television and movies, she has delivered many leading roles on the stage, and is also a dancer.

== Biography ==
Nafpliotou was born in Athens and still resides there. She took up dancing while at school, initially with the Rodopi Kouvari Dancing School but continued her studies at the Rallou Manou Professional Dancing School, whence she graduated. After she completed her studies, she started her career as a professional dancer as a member of Rallou Manou's Greek Chorodram (1987-1992) and a member of the modern dancing group Andromeda (1990-1992). From 1992 to 1996 she was the lead dancer for the dance theater group Roes, formed by Sofia Spyratou.

In 1992 she made her first appearance on the big screen in the movie Island. In 1993 she was the leading lady of the short-length film From Now On (Apo do kai pera) by Maria Douza. From 1996 to 1998 she studied drama at the George Kimoulis Modern Theater Of Athens drama school. She had previously had acting lessons at the Giannis Rigas workshop. In 1996 she appeared on television for the first time, taking part in the TV film Niovi Was Dancing Her Life (I Niovi horeve ti zoi tis) by Alexandros Papailiou. However, it was in 1998-1999 that she became widely known, starring in the critically acclaimed Mega Channel television series The Throne Room (I Aithousa tou Thronou) as Glafke, a young woman returning to the Greek islands in the 1960s to find out more about her father, who had been executed as a partisan during World War 2. The series, directed by Pigi Dimitrakopoulou, became internationally famous for its multi-dimensional storyline, lush photography, and insights into generational change during the 1960s. Since then she has starred in a number of TV productions, namely Stand by Me (Meine dipla mou) by Reina Eskenazi and The 10 again by Pigi Dimitrakopoulou. Her movie career includes 3 films: Chariton's Choir, for which she received a Best Actress Award in the 22nd Alexandreia’s Film Festival, Soul Kicking (Best Supporting Actress National Award) and Dying In Athens (Pethainontas stin Athina).

In 1999 she began to make an impact on the stage, appearing first as Catherine Holly in Tennessee Williams' Suddenly, Last Summer at the New Stage of the National Theatre of Greece under the direction of Korais Damatis. In the summer of the same year she took the role of Antigone in Euripides' Foinisses, a production of the National Theatre of Northern Greece in Epidavros, Herodion and other ancient theatres. Since then she has appeared in Shakespeare's Twelfth Night, Love's Labours Lost, King Lear, Dostoevsky's The Idiot, Ibsen’s The Lady From the Sea, Molière's Don Juan, Euripides' Iphigeneia in Tauris and The Trojan Women, and Aeschylus' Oresteia. Much of her work has been as a member of the successful Experimental Theatrical Group of the National Theatre of Greece under the direction of Stathis Livathinos, with whom she continued working in Mikhail Lermontov's Masquerade, in J.M.Synge's Playboy of the Western World and in Carmen, an adaptation of Bizet’s opera and Mérimée’s work. In September 2010 she portrayed Dushanka in Goran Bregovic’s monologue Diaries of a Sad Queen, successfully presented in Herodion.

She has also continued to dance, including in two dance theatre pieces written and directed by Constantinos Rigos.

Playing an ancient Greek high priestess, she lit the Olympic torch for the 2008 Beijing Olympics using the sun's rays, starting the 2008 Summer Olympics torch relay. On October 22, 2009, she repeated the performance, starting the 2010 Winter Olympics torch relay.
