= Yannis Economides =

Cypriot filmmaker

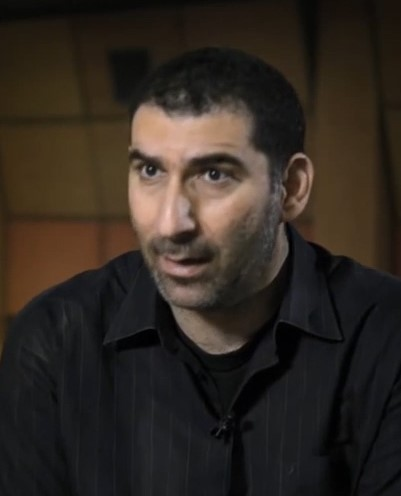
- Economides in 2014
- Born: 1967 (age 58–59); Limassol, Cyprus
- Occupations: Film director; screenwriter
- Years active: 1989–present
- Style: Psychological thriller, psychological drama
- Movement: Greek Weird Wave

Yannis Economides (Greek: Γιάννης Οικονομίδης; born 1967) is a Greek Cypriot screenwriter and filmmaker, who is considered to be one of the leading creators of modern Greek cinema. His films explore themes of emotional and physical violence, alongside the collapse of petty-bourgeois society and the pathologies of today's families. They are characterized by their extreme use of profanity and depiction of graphic violence.

Economides has cited fellow Greek filmmakers like Kostas Manoussakis, Alexis Damianos, Tonia Marketaki among others, as well as directors from the international scene such as the Coen Brothers, Robert Altman, Ken Loach, John Cassavetes, Gaspar Noé, Louis Malle and Richard Brooks as influences on his work.

== Early life ==
Yannis Economides was born in Limassol in 1967, the eldest of three siblings. According to him, even though he was young when the 1974 Cypriot coup d'état took place, this experience has left an impression on him and later influenced his work. After finishing school, he moved to Athens in 1986 and attended courses at the cinema school of Eugenia Hadjikou.

Economides' career began with short films and documentaries. The Gradual Improvement of the Weather and Only Smelling Jasmine were honored, in 1992 and 1994 respectively, at the Drama International Short Film Festival.

== Career ==
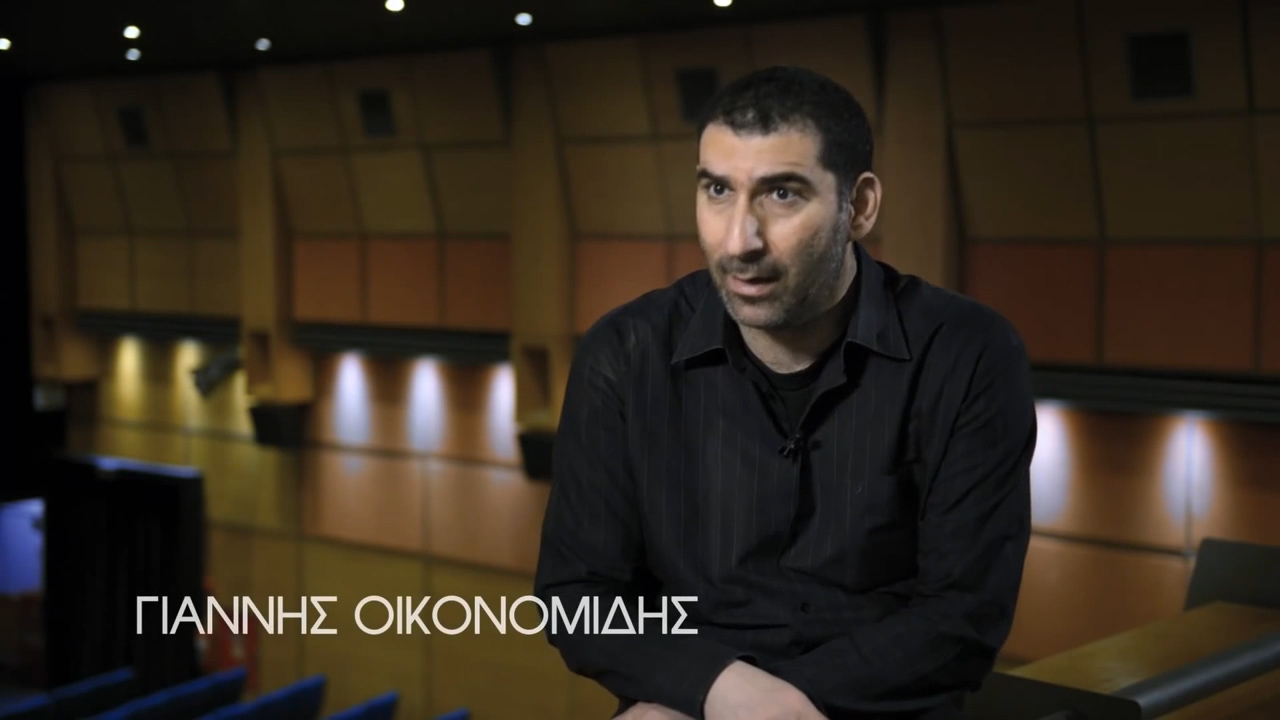

After short films and documentaries, he wrote and directed his first feature film Matchbox in 2002.

His second feature film, Soul Kicking, premiered in the International Critics' Week section at Cannes Film Festival in 2006. His third film Knifer, which released in 2010 has won seven awards from the Hellenic Film Academy, including Best Film, Best Director and Best Screenplay. His fourth feature film, Stratos, premiered in the Competition Programme of the 64th Berlin International Film Festival in 2014.

Each of his four feature films has been honored with the Greek Film Critics Association Award for Best Greek Feature Film.

In October 2016, his first theatrical production premiered at the New Stage of the National Theatre in Athens, with Economides directing his own play Sleep, Stella, Sleep. He performed as a supporting actor in several Greek films. In 2017 he had a part in Fatih Akin’s latest film, In the Fade.

== Filmography ==
- Broken Vein (2025)
- Ballad for a Pierced Heart (2020)
- Stratos (2014), Color, 137’ 64th Berlin International Film Festival 2014 – Competition Programme LAGFF 2015: Best Feature Film Award (Orpheus Award) Cyprus Film Days 2014: Best Feature Film Award Hellenic Film Academy Awards: Best Sound, Best Original Music Score, Best Leading Actor, Best Supporting Actress Greek Association of Film Critics Award: Best Greek Film of the Year 2014 Med Film Fest in Rome 2014: Amore e Psiche (Grand Prize) European Film Awards 2014: Pre-nomination
- Knifer (2010), Black&White, 108’ LAGFF 2011: Best Feature Film Award (Orpheus Award) Cyprus Film Days 2011: Best Feature Film Award Hellenic Film Academy Awards: Best Film, Best Director, Best Screenplay, Best Cinematography, Best Editing, Best Production Design, Best Sound Greek Association of Film Critics Award: Best Greek Film of the Year 2010 PUSAN international Film Festival 2010 11th Kaohsiung Film Festival New York Greek Film Festival 2011 Haifa IFF 2011 Eskisehir IFF 2011 Bildrausch Film Fest Basel 2011 Black Movie Festival 2012
- Soul Kicking (2006), Color, 117’ Official section of the Cannes International Film Festival 2006, “The International Critics’ Week" Chicago International Film Festival 2006, Pusan International Film Festival 2006, Tallinn Black Nights Film Festival 2006, Cyprus Film Days 2007, Festival Del Cinema Europeo 2007 (Lecce-Italy), Eurocine 27 2007 (Madrid)
- Matchbox (2002), Color, 81’ Thessaloniki International Film Festival 2002, Montreal World Film Festival, 2003 Pusan International Film Festival, 2003 International Film Festival of India 2003, New Delhi
- The Life You Hoped For (1995), documentary
- Smelling the Jasmine (1994), documentary
- Gradual Improvement in the Weather (1992), short
- Welcome, Night (1990), documentary
- Episode (1989), short
