= Mirella Papaeconomou =

Greek screenwriter

Mirella Papaeconomou, born in Athens, is a Greek screenwriter for TV series. She has studied English literature and set and costume design in London, as well as set and costume design and advertising in Vacalo Arts and Design College, in Athens. She has worked for the theatre as production designer. Her first screenplay was written in 1984. Since 1984 she has written many screenplays for TV series that have become great hits. She has won two "Prosopa" Greek Television Awards for the series Logo Timis and I Zoi pou Den Ezisa.

== Works ==
Screenplays
Title	Year	Channel	Notes
Gynaikes	1992		
Anastasia	1993	Mega Channel	
Parathyro ston Ilio	1994		
Mi Fovasai tin Fotia	1994		
Apon	1995		
Logo Timis	1996	Mega Channel	
I Zoi pou Den Ezisa	1998	Mega Channel	
Ouden Provlima	2000		
Leni	2003	Mega Channel	
Oneiro Itan	2003		
Etsi Hathika	2004		
Mov – Roz	2005	ANT1	
Ioanna tis Kardias	2006		
To Nisi	2010	Mega Channel	Adapted screenplay
