= Soul Kicking =

- Directed by: Yannis Economides
- Written by: Yannis Economides
- Starring: Errikos Litsis; Vangelis Mourikis; Maria Kehayioglou
- Music by: Akis Kapranos
- Release date: 13 October 2006 (BIFF)
- Running time: 157 minutes
- Country: Greece
- Language: Greek

Soul Kicking (Greek: η ψυχή στο στόμα) is a 2006 Greek drama film directed by Yannis Economides.

== Cast ==
- Errikos Litsis - Takis
- Vangelis Mourikis - Periklis
- Maria Kehayioglou - Eirini
- Giannis Voulgarakis - Giorgos
- Maria Nafpliotou - Popi
- Costas Xikominos - Tzimis
