= The 10 (novel) =

Novel by M. Karagatsis

- Paperback Cover Photo
- Author: M. Karagatsis
- Language: Greek
- Publication date: 1964

The 10 is an unfinished novel written by M. Karagatsis. The novel was written in 1960 and was the last novel of M. Karagatsis. Although it was unfinished, the novel was released in 1964 by Estia Publications, four years after the death of Karagatsis. Since then, the novel has many new publications. The 10 was adapted for TV series by the director Pigi Dimitrakopoulou, in 2007. The adapted screenplay was written by Stavros Kalafatidis, Mary Zafeiropoulou and Giorgos Kritikos.

== Plot ==
The novel presents as main characters the tenants of an old block of flats near Piraeus, during 1950s. The owner of the block is a rich man, named Kalogeras. His nephew is a tenant of the block and he hopes to be his heir. The novel comprises also many other characters from the neighbourhood near the block of flats or other persons related with the main characters.

== See also ==
- The 10 (TV series)
