= I Agapi Argise mia Mera =

- Directed by: Kostas Koutsomytis
- Starring: Kariofyllia Karampeti, Tania Trypi, Peggy Trikalioti, Minas Hatzisavvas, Nicola Farron, Afroditi Grigoriadou, Vassilis Diamantopoulos, Giorgos Moschidis
- Country of origin: Greece
- Original language: Greek
- No. of seasons: 1

Production
- Running time: 45 minutes

Original release
- Network: ERT/ΕΤ1
- Release: 1997 – 1998

I Agapi Argise mia Mera (Greek: Η αγάπη άργησε μια μέρα) is a Greek television series that was aired by ERT/ΕΤ1 in season 1997-98. It was adapted from a novel by Lili Zografou. The series was directed by Kostas Koutsomytis and it starred Kariofyllia Karampeti, Tania Trypi, Minas Hatzisavvas, Giorgos Moschidis, Peggy Trikalioti, Nicola Farron, Afroditi Grigoriadou, Vassilis Diamantopoulos and others. The series won 11 Greek television awards and it is the most award-winning Greek TV series along with The Ten. The soundtrack of the series was written by Vassilis Dimitriou and it became a success.

== Plot ==
A traditional family in Crete during German occupation tries to hide an undesirable pregnancy. In the same time, the father dies from a disease and the oldest daughter takes over the family.

== Cast ==
- Kariofyllia Karampeti
- Tania Trypi
- Minas Hatzisavvas
- Giorgos Moschidis
- Peggy Trikalioti
- Nicola Farron
- Afroditi Grigoriadou
- Vassilis Diamantopoulos
- Marina Psalti
- Maria Kavoukidi

== Awards ==
The series won 11 television awards in "Prosopa" Greek Television Awards:

List of awards and nominations
Award	Category	Recipients and nominees	Result
Prosopa 1998	Best Drama Series	Kostas Koutsomytis	Won
Prosopa 1998	Best Director	Kostas Koutsomytis	Won
Prosopa 1998	Best adapted screenplay	Kostas Koutsomytis, Nikos Apeiranthitis, Marios Pontikas	Won
Prosopa 1998	Best leading actor	Minas Hatzisavvas	Won
Prosopa 1998	Best leading actress	Kariofyllia Karampeti	Won
Prosopa 1998	Best supporting actor	Giorgos Moschidis	Won
Prosopa 1998	Best supporting actress	Afroditi Grigoriadou	Won
Prosopa 1998	Best editing	Panos Papakyriakopoulos	Won
Prosopa 1998	Best Production Design	Rena Georgiadou, Angeliki Samara	Won
Prosopa 1998	Best Costume Design	Rena Georgiadou, Angeliki Samara	Won
Prosopa 1998	Best production	PROFIT, ERT	Won
