= Makis Angelopoulos =

Greek basketball team owner

Μakis Angelopoulos
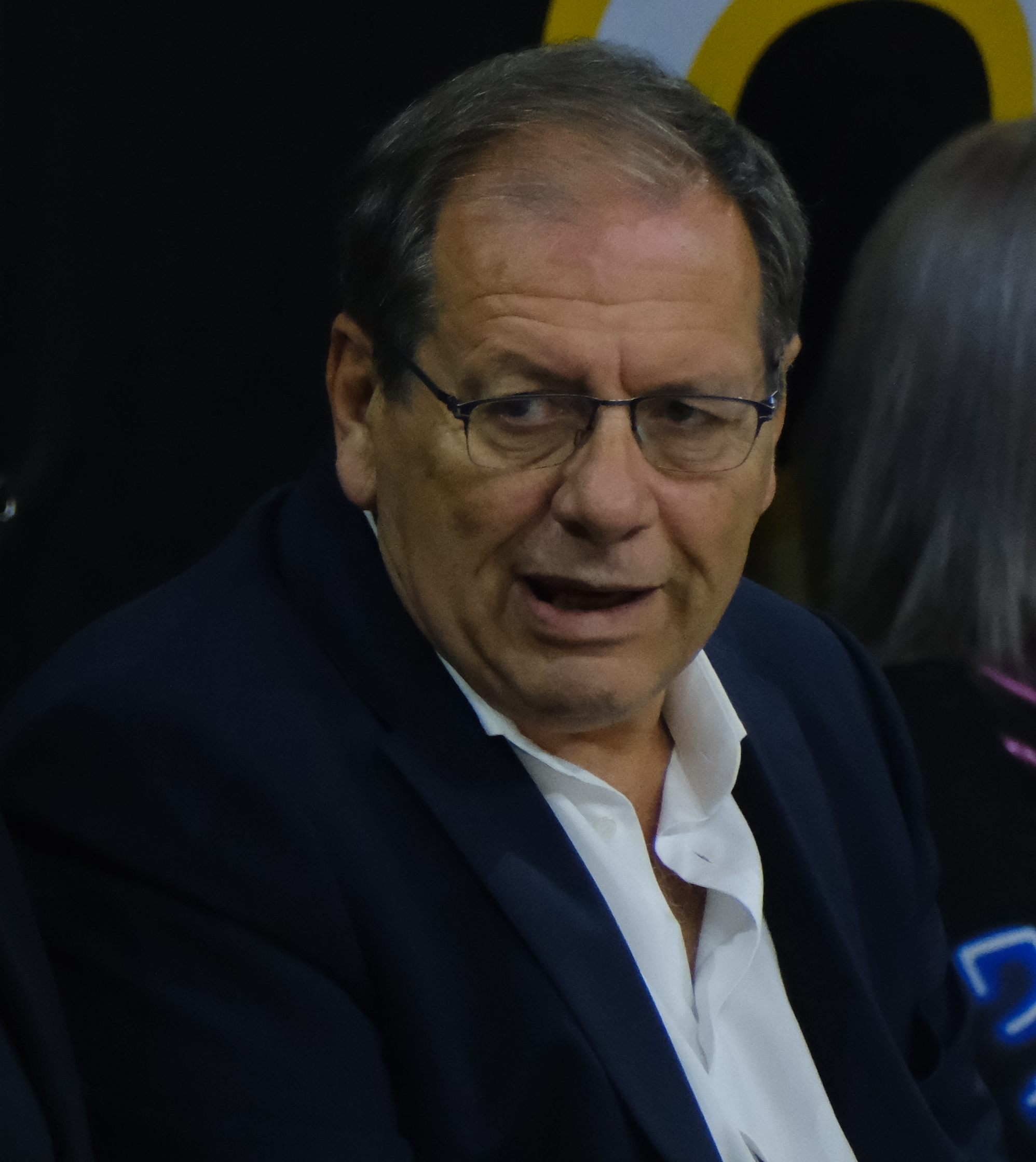
- Born: July 1964; 61 years ago Nea Smyrni, Athens, Greece
- Occupations: Shareholder of Neurosoft; Owner of AEK Athens B.C.
- Children: 3

Mavroeidis "Makis" Angelopoulos (alternate spellings: Mavroidis, Makis, Aggelopoulos) (Greek: Μαυροειδής "Μάκης" Αγγελόπουλος) is the co-owner of the basketball team AEK Athens.

== Early life ==
Angelopoulos was born in Nea Smyrni, south Athens, Greece and was raised in central Athens.

== Business career ==
=== Neurosoft ===
Neurosoft was founded back in 1994. Currently maintains subsidiaries in Cyprus and Romania and presence in Albania, Serbia and Bulgaria. Since 2009 started on the AIM market of the Borsa Italiana, the trading of company's shares. In fact, it was the first IT company entered this market. Also, shareholders in the company are OPAP (with a rate of 30%) and Lottomatica/Gtech (with a rate of 16.6%).

=== AEK Athens B.C. ===
In October, 2014, Angelopoulos became active for Greek basketball team AEK, in order to bring the club back to success.

On November 24, 2014, Angelopoulos became shareholder of AEK after he took the majority stake of the team (with a rate of 76%).

On October 9, 2015, Angelopoulos became chairman of AEK B.C.

He produced the 2018 historical-sports film 1968 which was directed by Tassos Boulmetis.
