= Maria Douza =

Greek film director and screenwriter

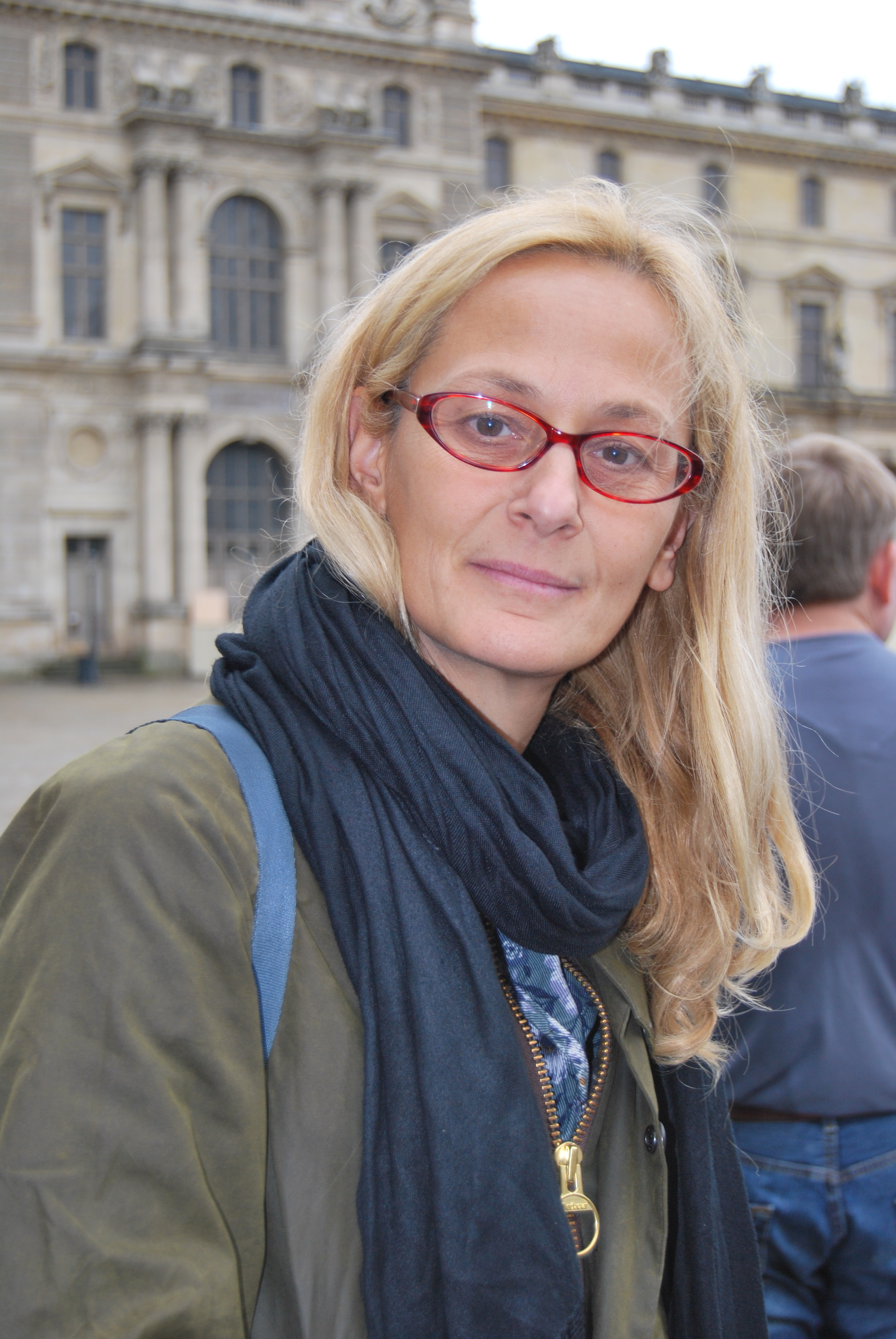

Maria Douza is a Greek film director and screenwriter of feature films, commercials and documentaries. She studied at the National Film & TV School of England. She lives and works in Athens, Greece. Her films are distributed nationally and internationally.

Her first feature film The Tree and the Swing - alternately named A Place Called Home, released in 2013 and was subsequently acquired by Netflix Europe. Her second feature, Listen(2022) originally titled Akouse me, was featured in film festivals all over the world, and streaming rights have been sold to broadcasters in Latin America, Britain and the USA.

Maria Douza's television work includes the History Series Small Lessons for a Big World and Lasting Through Time for the Hellenic Parliament TV Channel.

Douza is married to producer Michael Sarantinos and has two children, Giorgis and Dione.

== Early life and education ==
Maria Douza studied Byzantine Literature at the National and Kapodistrian University of Athens and, subsequently, Film Direction at the National Film & TV School of England, where she wrote and directed her first short films, The Bridge(1990, 30') and The Island(1994, 42'), introducing, in the latter, the now acclaimed actress Maria Nafpliotou. After completing her studies, Maria Douza returned to Greece and immediately started working with production company Stefi directing TV commercials. While working on commercials, she also attended the MFI (Mediterranean Film Institute) Script2Film writing workshops, through which she developed her first screenplays, under the guidance of writing tutors Lewis Cole and Christina Lazarides.

== Career ==
Between 2000 - 2008, Douza continued to direct high-profile TV commercials, including Euro-Elections and National Elections spots, as well as social awareness spots about Streetlight Kids, Domestic Violence and Energy Saving. In 2008, she joined production company Steficon Films as in-house film director making cultural videos, commercials, and documentaries for television and the web.

Between 2008 - 2010, she worked as film consultant on research program ANSWER carried out by a consortium of European universities, companies and research centers, under the auspices of the National Technical University of Athens (NTUA). The aim of the program was to develop a notation system for the production of fictional audiovisual works, called Director Notation.

In 2012, Douza directed her first feature film, written by her (based on an idea by Eleni Atsikbasis), The Tree and the Swing - or - A Place Called Home, featuring Mirjana Karanovic, Myrto Alikaki and Elias Logothetis. The film, a Greek-Serbian co production between Steficon Films and IntermediaNetwork, premiered at the Montreal World Film Festival in 2013, and, subsequently, traveled to international festivals all over the world, winning awards and distinctions. After its theatrical release and broadcast at home in 2014, it went on to represent Greece in the 2014-2015 European Union Film Festivals of India, Canada, China, Hong Kong and the USA. First acquired by EastWest Filmdistribution, rights to the film were purchased by Netflix Europe in 2022.

After that, Douza made a documentary, titled Thission Cinema of Athens (2017, 52'), as part of the French TV Cine+ series Mythical Cinemas. A Greek French co-production between Kolam Productions and Steficon Films, rights to Thission Cinema were sold to numerous broadcasters around the world by Premiere Entertainment. In 2018, she made the documentary, Pantelis Kaliotsoss, In the Writer's Workshop, a film on the ethics of creativity and writing, shown at the Thessaloniki Documentary Festival and acquired by Cosmote TV.

From 2020 to 2023, Douza created (and directed in collaboration with Polish director Oliwia Twardowska) two extremely successful TV history series, for the Hellenic Parliament TV Channel: Small Lessons for a Big World and Lasting Through Time, both based on lectures of professor Maria Efthymiou. Lasting Through Time was broadcast by Hellenic Broadcast Corporation - ERT - in 2025.

In 2022, she made her second feature film, Listen (original title Akouse me), also written by her, a Greek-Bulgarian co production between Steficon Films and Ars Digital. After its premiere at the Thessaloniki International Film Festival, Listen was shown at many festivals around the world, including Tallinn Black Nights, Cairo International, Sofia International, Dhaka International (winning the Women Filmmakers' award), and Galway Film Fleadh. Centering around a deaf adolescent girl, Listen was also widely shown at International Youth Festivals, winning awards in Azerbaijan's Salam International Film Festival and Finland's Oulu Youth Film Festival. Acquired by Screenbound UK, Listen has been broadcast in Latin America, Canada, USA and Britain, and continues to travel, representing Greece in the European Film Festivals of India, Canada, China and the USA.

Maria Douza is currently working on her next feature film, End Point, an anti-war fantasy, pitched in Galway Film Fleadh Marketplace in 2023 and the Thessaloniki International Film Festival Agora in 2024. End Point will be produced as a co production between a consortium of three European companies headed by Steficon Films of Greece and a Canadian partnership between U11 Productions and Equinoxe Films. It will be Maria's first English speaking film.

== Filmography ==
Title		Year	Duration	medium
Listen (Akouse me)	Fiction	2022	108'	DCP
Pantelis Kaliotsos, In The Writer's Workshop	Documentary	2018	63'	DCP
Thission Cinema of Athens	Docu-drama	2017	52'	DCP
The Tree and the Swing (aka A Place Called Home)	Fiction	2013	107'	DCP
The Agas Trial in Chios	Documentary	2008	70'	DV-HD
The Making of "Free Diving"	Documentary	1994	20'	DV-HD
The Island (Από δω και Πέρα)	Fiction	1994	42	16mm
The Bridge	Fiction	1991	30'	16mm
