= Afroditi Grigoriadou =

Greek actress (1931–2020)

- Born: 29 December 1931; Sevastopol, Crimea, Russian SFSR, Soviet Union
- Died: 2 July 2020 (aged 88); Athens, Greece
- Children: Koralia Karanti

Afroditi Grigoriadou (29 December 1931 – 2 July 2020) was a Greek actress of film, theatre and television.

== Personal life ==
She was the mother of actress Koralia Karanti.

== Selected filmography ==
Year	Title	Role	Notes
1962	Electra		
1997	I Agapi Argise mia Mera		

== Awards ==
Awards
Year	Award	Television	Result
1998	Prosopa 1998 for best supporting actress	I Agapi Argise mia Mera	Won
