= Matchbox (2002 film) =

- Directed by: Yannis Economides
- Starring: Errikos Litsis; Eleni Kokkidou
- Release date: 14 November 2003 (TIFF)
- Running time: 80 minutes
- Country: Greece
- Language: Greek

Matchbox (Greek: Σπιρτόκουτο) is a 2002 Greek drama film directed by Yannis Economides.

== Cast ==
- Errikos Litsis - Dimitris
- Eleni Kokkidou - Maria
- Costas Xikominos - Giorgos
- Giannis Voulgarakis - Vangelis
- Ioanna Ivanoudi - Margarita
- Stavros Yagoulis - Loukas
- Angeliki Papoulia - Kiki
