= Tis Agapis Maheria =

- Της Αγάπης Μαχαιριά
- Genre: Drama
- Created by: Ivonne Metaxaki
- Written by: Ivonne Metaxaki
- Directed by: Stratos Markidis
- Starring: Fay Zafeirakou; Kostas Sommer; Giannis Voglis; Spiros Fokas; Melina Boteli; Toni Dimitriou
- Theme music composer: Xristos Papadopoulos
- Opening theme: Eixa kapote mia agapi by Kostas Karafotis
- Ending theme: Eixa kapote mia agapi by Kostas Karafotis; Mahairi Dikopo by Mihalis Tzouganakis
- Country of origin: Greece
- Original language: Greek
- No. of seasons: 2
- No. of episodes: 62

Production
- Executive producer: Stratos Markidis
- Producer: Stratos Markidis
- Production locations: Athens; Crete; Poros
- Cinematography: Vasilis Blatsas
- Running time: 60 minutes

Original release
- Network: ANT1
- Release: January 16, 2006 – June 27, 2007

Tis Agapis Maheria (Love's piercing) (Greek: Της Αγάπης Μαχαιριά) is a dramatic television series by Stratos Markidis and a screenplay Yvonne Metaxaki raised by ANT1. The series takes place in Crete and narrates the vendetta between two families, Stamatakides and Leventogiannides. It first aired on January 16, 2006, the series had two seasons. The first season of 21 episodes and the second season of 42 episodes.

== Plot ==
Two families separated by deep hatred... A feud that rose a century ago. A vendetta that has lasted a century. Now, an unlawful daughter born twenty years ago from a forbidden love, returns in the midst of the incessant quarrel that has spilled much family blood on both sides. The news fall like a bomb in the village.

== Cast ==
Actor	Role
Fay Zafeirakou	Maria Leventogianni
Kostas Sommer	Sifis Stamatakis
Giannis Voglis	Markos Leventogiannis
Spiros Fokas	Antonis Stamatakis †
Melina Mpoteli	Ourania Stamataki
Nikos Verlekis	Lefteris "Drakolefteris" Leventogiannis †
Mpampis Alatzas	Iraklis Stamatakis †
Leonidas Kakouris	Giannis "O Fonias" Leventogiannis †
Toni Dimitriou	Kostantis Leventogiannis †
Iosif Marinakis	Giorgis Stamatakis †
Mariana Polixronidi	Pelagia Leventogianni
Giannis Karatzogiannis	Pater Theoklitos
Nadia Deligianni	Areti Leventogianni
Anthi Andreopoulou	Anthoula Leventogianni
Reggina Pantelidi	Olga Stamataki
Giorgos Voultzatis	Vaggelis †
Konstantinos Famis	Orestis Stamatakis
Teta Savvati	Agapi Stamataki
Xristos Paggalias	Manousos †
Dimitris Gallos	Pavlis Stamatakis †
Dimitra Aggelopoulou	Eugenia
Niki Ioannidou	Dimitra/Eleni Leventogianni (Flashback)
Athina Zotou	Stella
Dimitris Chaikalis	Stavrakis Leventogiannis
Aggelos Theodoropoulos	Stefanis
Nikos Poriotis	Stratis Leventogiannis †
Vaggelis Liodakis	Menelaos

In guest roles

Actor	Rolos
Panos Gogos	Stelianos Leventogiannis †
Fanis Katechos	Argiris Leventogiannis †
Nikos Mpilias	Nikolis Stamatakis
Dimitris Kalantzis	Mixalis Stamatakis †
Dimitris Menounos	Miros †
Eirini Kazakou	Liza
Iro Fragioudaki	Kalio
Thodoros Romanidis	Vasilis
Macarena Benites	Elvira †
Notis Pitsilos	Notis
Τίσα Βασιλάκη	Roza †
Spiros Spantidas	Kiriakos Xidakis
Antonis Rampaounis	Minas

Leventogiannis Family

Actor	Role
Fay Zafeirfakou	Maria Leventogianni
Giannis Voglis	Markos Leventogiannis
Nikos Verlekis	Lefteris "Drakolefteris" Leventogiannis †
Leonidas Kakouris	Giannis "O Fonias" Leventogiannis †
Toni Dimitriou	Kostantis Leventogiannis †
Mariana Polixronidi	Pelagia Leventogianni
Nadia Deligianni	Areti Leventogianni
Anthi Andreopoulou	Anthoula Leventogianni
Xristos Paggalias	Manousos †
Dimitris Chaikalis	Stavrakis Leventogiannis
Nikos Poriotis	Stratis Leventogiannis †
Panos Gogos	Stelianos Leventogiannis †
Fanis Katechos	Argiris Leventogiannis †

Stamatakis Family

Actor	Role
Kostas Sommer	Sifis Stamatakis
Spiros Fokas	Antonis Stamatakis †
Melina Mpoteli	Ourania Stamataki
Mpampis Alatzas	Iraklis Stamatakis †
Iosif Marinakis	Giorgis Stamatakis †
Reggina Pantelidi	Olga Stamataki
Konstantinos Famis	Orestis Stamatakis
Teta Savvati	Agapi Stamataki
Dimitris Gallos	Pavlis Stamatakis †
Nikos Mpilias	Nikolis Stamatakis
Dimitris Kalantzis	Mixalis Stamatakis †
Dimitris Menounos	Miros †

== International release ==
Country	Network(s)	Title	Series premiere	Series finale	Weekly schedule	Timeslot
Greece	ANT1	Της Αγάπης Μαχαιριά	January 16, 2006	June 27, 2007	Monday; Wednesday	22:00
Greece	ANT1	Της Αγάπης Μαχαιριά	2010	2010	Monday-Friday	02:00
Greece	ANT1	Της Αγάπης Μαχαιριά	2012	2012	Monday-Friday	03:00
Greece	ANT1	Της Αγάπης Μαχαιριά	2014		Monday-Friday	01:45 (2 hours)
Cyprus	ANT1 Cyprus	Της Αγάπης Μαχαιριά	2013	2013	-	-
Serbia	Prva	Рањено срце/Ranjeno srce	August 6, 2012	October 30, 2012	-	-
