= Giorgos Mitsikostas =

Greek comedian

- Born: 12 October 1968 (age 57); Athens, Greece
- Education: Athens University of Economics and Business
- Occupations: comedian, impressionist

Giorgos Mitsikostas (Greek: Γιώργος Μητσικώστας) (born 12 October 1968) is a famous Greek comedic impressionist in Greece.

== Biography ==
He started his professional career by impersonating Greek public figures, mainly sports people (e.g. famous sportscaster Giannis Diakogiannis and Filippas Sirigos) and politicians (prime ministers Konstantinos Karamanlis and Andreas Papandreou) on radio satiric shows on FM Radio station "Athens 98.4". The name of his show had the -completely- random title, "The conspirators of the night, in the conspiracy of the patsas" (Greek: Οι συνωμότες της νύχτας, στη συνωμοσία του πατσά), in which his co-presenator was, the later well-known TV presenter, Nikos Evaggelatos.

He was doing amateur radio shows some time before as a university student (in the Buness Management department of AUEB) on college radio. His debut on TV was in 1990. Since then he has been on many Greek channels, and afterwards started to impersonate actors, singers and journalists as well, and changed the form of his shows. All of the titles of his shows are a word play, usually with his name.

== TV shows ==
- Pitsi Pitsi me to Mitsi - Πίτσι Πίτσι με το Μίτσι ('chit-chat with Mitsi') on Mega Channel - 1992
- FTYSTOUS - Φτύστους (both 'spit them' and 'identical' in Greek) on Alpha TV (a Greek version of Spitting Image with puppets) - 1993
- TRELLAS - Τρελλάς (a mixture of 'Hellas' and the Greek word for 'folly' on Alpha TV - 1994
- Tatsi-mitsi-kosta - Τάτσι-Μήτσι-Κώστα on ANT1 - 1996
- MitsiHosta - Μιτσι Χώστα (a wordplay roughly meaning 'Bash them, MitsiKosta') on Alter Channel (2001–2006)
- The Da Mitsi Code - Κώδικας Ντα Μήτσι (2006–2007)
- O Giorgos Sfirikse - Ο Γιώργος Σφύριξε (2008–2009)
- Mhtsi Show on Epsilon TV (2013–2014)
- The Mitsi Show on ERT1 (2018)
- Mitsi Var on Action 24 (2023-2025)

== Filmography ==
Year	Title	Role	Notes
1998	Flubber	Professor Philip Brainard	Voice in Greek dubbing
2018	1968	PROPO betting shop owner	

== Sources and external links ==
- Official site
- Giorgos Mitsikostas at IMDb
- at retrodb.gr
