= Anastasia (TV series) =

- Created by: Mirella Papaeconomou
- Starring: Myrto Alikaki, Alkis Kourkoulos, Minas Hatzisavvas
- Country of origin: Greece
- No. of seasons: 1
- No. of episodes: 18

Production
- Running time: 45

Original release
- Network: Mega Channel
- Release: October 1993 – 1994

Anastasia is a Greek TV series that was aired in season 1993-94 by Mega Channel. The series was one of the most successful series of that period. It is written by Mirella Papaeconomou and it stars Myrto Alikaki, Alkis Kourkoulos and Minas Hatzisavvas. The series was about a love triangle and was considered pretty bold for the Greek society of 1990s. The soundtrack of the series that was composed by Dimitris Papadimitriou and performed by Eleftheria Arvanitaki, became the first platinum certified TV soundtrack in Greece.

== Plot ==
Anastasia is a young woman who works as model and studies acting. The plot is about her parallel relationship with both a young man and his father. This relationship upsets the family relationships between these two men.

== Cast ==
- Myrto Alikaki
- Alkis Kourkoulos
- Minas Hatzisavvas
- Gerasimos Skiadaresis
- Marianna Toumasatou
