= Tamam (TV series) =

Greek television series

- Ταμάμ
- Genre: Comedy
- Created by: Vasilis Risvas; Dimitra Sakali
- Directed by: Pierros Andrakakos
- Starring: Manolis Mavromatakis; Myrto Alikaki (season 3); Maria Lekaki (season 1 & 2); Lila Baklesi; Giannis Chatzigeorgiou; Tzortzina Liosi; Tasos Bokos; Nikos Magdalinos
- Country of origin: Greece
- Original language: Greek
- No. of seasons: 3
- No. of episodes: 66

Production
- Producer: ANTS Hub
- Running time: 45 minutes/episode

Original release
- Network: ANT1
- Release: 13 October 2014 – 12 May 2017

Ταμάμ (lit. "Okay") is a Greek television comedy-drama series. It premiered in October 2014 on ANT1. The series is based on the German TV series Türkisch für Anfänger.

The show focuses on the Greek-Turkish family Christidou-Öztürk, their everyday lives, and particularly on the eldest daughter Elli, who narrates the show. Show topics included typical problems of teenagers and cross-cultural experiences among the Greek and Turkish people. Viewers watch Cem and Elli's rocky relationship turning into a love story. Tamam was said to be the most popular TV series of ANT1 when its third season aired in October 2016.

== Series οverview ==
| Season | Episodes | Timeslot (EET) | Year | Air dates | | Premiere ratings | | |
| Season | Episodes | Timeslot (EET) | Year | Season premiere | Season finale | Rating share (adults 15–44) | Rating share (household) | Viewers (in millions) |
|---|---|---|---|---|---|---|---|---|
| 1 | 23 | Monday 22:15 (episodes 1–9); Friday 22:15 (episodes 10–23) | 2014-2015 | 13 October 2014 | 29 May 2015 | 22% | 22, 3% | 1.048 |
| 2 | 23 | Tuesday 22:15 (episodes 1–8); Friday 22:15 (episodes 9–23) | 2015-2016 | 22 October 2015 | 13 May 2016 | 22, 8% | 20,4% | 0.95 |
| 3 | 20 | Friday 23:00 | 2016-2017 | 25 November 2016 | 12 May 2017 | 19, 3% | 15% | 0.54 |

== Plot ==
=== Season 1 ===
The new "family" has to get used to each other: Elli and Dilek have to share a room, complicating their sisterhood, as does the fact that Elli is an atheist and Dilek a pious Muslim girl wearing a hijab. Myrto, who is very free-spirited, has to get used to her new role as a mother of four instead of two. Her stepchildren include stepson Cem, a bit of "macho", and her stepdaughter, who is critical of her rudimentary kitchen skills. Meanwhile, Elli and Niko have to try to fit in at their new school, which is different from their old school. In the meantime, their relationship with their stepbrothers gets worse and worse. Elli and Cem won't stop fighting and both Dilek and Elli don't like each other. Elli's best friend Katerina is away at Dubai and Elli communicates with her via videos. Strangely enough, Dilek and Niko develop a good and loving relationship, which is unlike what is happening between Elli and Cem. Things get even worse when Alexis meets Elli at school, becoming friends with her, and Cem has to deal with the fact that he is jealous of their relationship. Later, Alexis and Elli fall in love, and Cem tries to find effective ways to take Elli away from him. Myrto and Metin both face problems but get over them quickly because of their love for each other. At the end of the season, Elli falls in love with Cem and the family is ready to go under challenges and strange situations.

== Cast ==
=== Main cast ===
| Actor/Actress | Role |
|---|---|
| Manolis Mavromatakis | Metin Ozturk |
| Maria Lekaki (season 1 & 2), Myrto Alikaki (season 3) | Myrto Christidou |
| Lila Baklesi | Ellie Christidou |
| Giannis Chatzigeorgiou | Tzem Ozturk |
| Tzortzina Liosi | Dilek Ozturk |
| Alexandros Caradimas | Nikos Christidis |
| Nikos Magdalinos | Ali |

=== Guest stars ===
==== Season 1 ====
| Actor/Actress | Role | Information about the role | Episodes |
|---|---|---|---|
| Paris Skartsolias | Teo Theodorou | Cem's best friend | 17 episodes |
| Denis Makris | Alexis | Ellie's boyfriend and classmate | 15 episodes |
| Lilian Archonti | Bahar Sismanoglu | Ali's girlfriend | 10 episodes |
| Maria Diakopanagiotou | Dina Tourkochoriti | Myrto's sister | 10 episodes |
| Babis Giotopoulos | Ermis Tourkochoritis | Myrto's father | 9 episodes |
| Giolanta Kalogeropoulou | Daphnie | Cem's girlfriend and classmate | 7 episodes |
| Giovanna Makka | Suna | Dilek's best friend | 5 episodes |
| Thodoris Frantzeskos | Miltos | Ellie's, Cem's, and Teo's classmate | 1 episode |

==== Season 2 ====
| Actor/Actress | Role | Information about the role |
|---|---|---|
| Kostas Spyropoulos | Markos Christidis | Ellie's and Niko's father |
| Paris Skartsolias | Teo Theodorou | Cem's best friend |
| Maria Diakopanagiotou | Dina Tourkochoriti | Myrto's sister |
| Babis Giotopoulos | Ermis Tourkochoritis | Myrto's father |
| Nefeli Kouri | Olga | Ellie's friend |
| Lilian Archonti | Bahar Sismanoglu | Ali's wife |
| Aliki Alxandraki | Yildiz Ozturk | Metin's Mother |
| Natassa Exindaveloni | Katerina | Ellie's best friend |
| Kalliopi Chaska | Maria h Kalogria | Ellie's friend |

== Production ==
Initially, the show was partially filmed at a neoclassical apartment in Kypseli, Athens.

== International broadcasts ==
- Greece - ANT1
- United States - ANT1 SATELLITE
- Canada - ANT1 SATELLITE
