= Oi Mikromesaioi =

Oi Mikromesaioi (Greek: Οι Μικρομεσαίοι) is a Greek comedy series. It was aired by Mega Channel during the 1992-1993 television season.
