= Lili Zografou =

- Λιλή Ζωγράφου
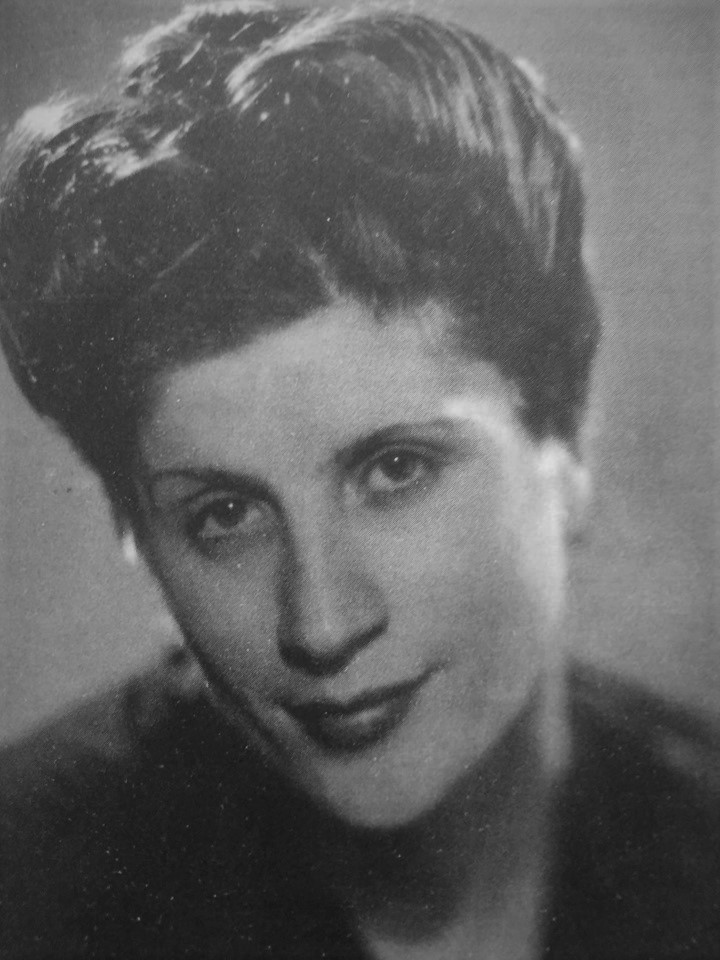
- Lili Zografou
- Born: Eleni Zografou; 17 June 1922; Heraklion, Crete, Greece
- Died: 2 October 1998 (aged 76); Heraklion, Crete, Greece
- Occupations: Journalist, novelist, dramatist, essayist and political activist
- Children: 1

Lili Zografou (/zɒɡˈrɑːfuː/; Greek: Λιλή Ζωγράφου [zoˈɣrafu]; June 17, 1922 – October 2, 1998) was a Greek journalist, novelist, dramatist, essayist, and political activist, best known for Nikos Kazantzakis: enas tragikos, her "destructive critique" of the work of Nikos Kazantzakis, published in 1959, three years after his death.

Zografou was an ardent supporter of women's rights; in her books, she particularly examined the status of women in Greek society of the second half of the 20th century. Her work's main themes include personal freedom, freedom of speech, sexual violence and sexual liberation.

During Greece's Axis occupation, Zografou joined the Greek Resistance against the Nazis; she was imprisoned while pregnant and gave birth inside the jail. Zografou openly criticised the Greek military junta of 1967-1973; her book Epangelma: Porni (Occupation: Whore) was a scathing testimony exposing the oppressiveness of the Colonels' Regime.

Commenting on her literary autobiography I Syvaritissa (The Sybarite), Demosthenis Kourtovik, a Greek literary critic and writer, characterised Zografou as "the gloomy Goddess Hecate of Greek literature".

== Biography ==
A biography of Lili Zografou could be written using solely texts from her books; most of her work is autobiographical.

=== Early life and education ===
Lili Zografou was born in Heraklion, Crete in 1922, the daughter of Andreas Zografos, the publisher of the daily newspaper Anorthosis (Recovery); her passion for journalism and writing was ignited by her father's own love for this job.

Zografou spent her childhood in Heraklion. She went to the Korais Lyceum and the Catholic Gymnasium of the Ursulines in Naxos. Subsequently, Zografou studied philology in Greece and abroad.

=== 1940s and 1950s ===
During Greece's Axis occupation, Zografou —aged 21 and pregnant— was imprisoned for participation in the Greek Resistance movement; her only child, poet Rena Hadjidakis, was born at that time.

After the liberation of Greece in 1944, Zografou worked as a journalist in renowned newspapers and journals. She also travelled in Europe and visited many countries of the Eastern Bloc. During the 1953-1954 biennium, Zografou lived in Paris.

Following her 1949 literary debut with the collection of novellas Agapi (Love), Zografou's treatise Nikos Kazantzakis: enas tragikos was published in 1959; Zografou examined Kazantzakis from a fresh viewpoint, focusing on his constant effort to become a superhuman and his problematic love life. Kazantzakis was generally revered as a luminary up until then, and Zografou's essay altered the way many people in Greece —especially youngsters— viewed his work.

Upon meeting with Zografou's father in Crete, politician Georgios Papandreou congratulated Andreas Zografos for his daughter's accurate description of Kazantzakis, whom he knew personally.

=== The Colonels' Regime ===
Lili Zografou was working as a civil employee at the Ministry of Defence when the Greek military junta of 1967 was established. At the same time, she editorialised for the magazine Gynaika (Woman) promoting progressive ideas and women's rights, often openly criticising the Colonels' Regime. Around 1970, she bought a house in Milatos Lasithiou and used the village as a model setting for many of her stories, especially for those set in rural areas of Greece.

In 1971, Zografou published her work O Iliopotis Elytis (Elytis the sun-drinker), a study on the poetry of Odyseas Elytis, who was later on awarded the Nobel Prize in Literature. Zografou contacted the eminent poet before publishing her essay, but, after reading the manuscript, Elytis made it clear that he did not approve of it and, in a way, forbade her to publish it. She eventually published her book, saddened but not deterred by Elytis' stance.

In 1974, she published 17 Noemvri 1973 – I nichta tis megalis sfagis, a chronicle of the 1973 Athens Polytechnic uprising, which she had witnessed. Zografou completed this book by hiding every finished page of the manuscript inside of an encyclopedia; she lived next to the Greek Military Police headquarters at that time and the police's house-to-house enquiries were quite often.

It took Lili Zografou five years to complete her book Epangelma: porni (Occupation: Whore) (1978). In this collection of shocking autobiographical stories, Zografou describes harsh personal experiences she had during the 7 year junta —mugging, suicide attempt and rape—, aiming to expose the patriarchal abusiveness of her time, as well as the Regime's oppressiveness.

=== 1980s and 1990s ===
After the fall of the junta in 1974, Zografou returned to journalism writing articles for Eleftherotypia and other newspapers and magazines.

During that time, she also published many commercially successful books; Mou servirete ena vasilopoulo parakalo (May I have a Crown Prince, please?), Nichtose agapi mou ine chtes (The night has come my love, it's yesterday), I agapi argise mia mera (Love arrived a day late) and the literary autobiography I Syvaritissa (The Sybarite), were some of them.

I agapi argise mia mera was adapted for a Hellenic Broadcasting Corporation series, starring Tania Tripi and Kariofilia Karampeti.

In 1998, Zografou published her last work, Apo ti Mideia sti Stachtopouta, i istoria tou fallou (From Medea to Cinderella; the story of the phallus), a large scale essay on the origins of patriarchy in Greek society, examining the Hellenic World from prehistoric times to the Great Tragedians.

=== Death ===
While on vacation in Heraklion in 1998, Zografou suffered a stroke; she died a few days later at Venizeleio General Hospital.

Her funeral was held at Saint Titus Church, Heraklion; many political figures and artists sent their condolences to her family.

Her will stipulated that the copyright for her books was to be given to both her publisher and the SOS Children's Villages of Greece.

== Personal beliefs ==
Interview of Lili Zografou on public television
- https://www.ert.gr/arxeio-afierwmata/lili-zografoy-2-oktovrioy-1998/

=== Religion ===
Zografou was an irreligious person. She viewed religion as a social structure and wrote many books partly or wholly devoted to the political aspects of Christianity; her book Antignosi, ta dekanikia tou kapitalismou (Anti-knowledge; capitalism's crutches), a historic essay on the origins of Christianity and its political function, became very popular and turned many clerics of the Church of Greece against her. In an interview she had on a private television channel, she characterised this essay as a "life work".

Zografou was an Epicurean, often discussing matters of death —even her own— and hedonism.

Interview of Lili Zografou on public television
- https://www.youtube.com/watch?v=dPmtDsQMi7Y

=== Politics ===
In her own words, Zografou "wasn't a communist", i.e. she didn't want to be a member of a certain party and have to follow an ideological doctrine. Due to her being uncommitted, and since her work revolves around revolution, many were those who characterised it as anarchic. It is certain that her political thought was progressive and largely related to the Left.

=== Feminism and sexuality ===
Zografou once stated: "I'm a keen anti-feminist for the simple reason that I am happy to be born a woman; what would become of me, where would I find all these plenty pleasures, if it wasn't for men?" (in Greek: “Είμαι παθιασμένη αντιφεμινίστρια για τον απλό λόγο ότι είμαι ευτυχής που γεννήθηκα γυναίκα. Και τι θα γινόμουν, πώς θα ‘παιρνα τόσες και τέτοιες ηδονές αν δεν υπήρχαν οι άντρες»).

Her literary work is mainly focused on women's struggle for self-determination, freedom and independence, and yet Zografou refrains from adopting a feminist point of view; she addresses women not as a liberator, but rather as a fellow woman who wishes them to claim their own personal freedom, a freedom pre-existing in them.

== Publications ==
- Agapi (Love), a collection of novellas (1949)
- Nikos Kazantzakis: enas tragikos (Nikos Kazantzakis: a tragic figure) (1959)
- Biographia-Apanta M. Polydouri (Biography-Oeuvre of Maria Polydouri) (1961)
- Kai to chrysafi ton kormion tous (And the gold of their bodies) (1961)
- Oi kataramenes (The cursed women) (1962)
- Oi Evraioi kapote (Mikael) [The Jews some time ago (Mikael)] (1966)
- O iliopotis Elytis (Elytis the sun-drinker) (1971)
- Paideia ora miden i tis ekmidenisis (Education's zero hour or For the nullification) (1972)
- Ti apogine ekeinos pou irthe na valei fotia (What became of the man who came to light a fire) (1972)
- Antignosi, ta dekanikia tou kapitalismou (Anti-knowledge; capitalism's crutches) (1974)
- 17 Noemvri 1973 – I nichta tis megalis sfagis (17 November 1973; the night of the great slaughter) (1974)
- K. Karyotakis-M. Polydouri, i arhi tis amfisvitisis (K. Karyotakis-M. Polydouri, the beginning of doubt) (1977)
- Epangelma: porni (Occupation: Whore) (1978)
- I gynaika pou hathike kavala sto alogo (The woman that vanished riding a horse) (1981)
- Mou servirete ena vasilopoulo parakalo (May I have a Crown Prince, please?) (1983)
- I gynaika sou i alitissa (Your rogue wife) (1984)
- I Syvaritissa (The Sybarite) (1987)
- Nichtose agapi mou ine chtes (The night has come my love, it's yesterday) (1990)
- Palaiopolis anamniseon (The antique-seller of memories) (1991)
- Pou edy mou to kallos (That my beauty withered) (1992)
- Paralirima se nto meizona (Delirium in C Major) (1992)
- Synchronos mas o Kafka (Kafka the modern one) (1993)
- I agapi argise mia mera (Love arrived a day late) (1994)
- Apo ti Mideia sti Stachtopouta, i istoria tou fallou (From Medea to Cinderella; the story of the phallus) (1998)
