= Erastis Dytikon Proastion =

- Genre: Comedy; Romance
- Written by: Lefteris Kaponis
- Directed by: Dimitris Arvanitis
- Starring: Alexis Georgoulis; Marilita Lampropoulou; Christos Nomikos; Arietta Moutousi; Magda Tsaggani; Charis Emmanouil
- Theme music composer: Nikos Terzis
- Country of origin: Greece
- Original language: Greek
- No. of seasons: 1
- No. of episodes: 33

Production
- Producers: Giannis Karagiannis; Faidra Manousakidou
- Production locations: Athens, Greece
- Running time: 35-40 minutes
- Production company: J.K. Productions

Original release
- Network: Mega Channel
- Release: September 27, 2004 – June 20, 2005

Erastis Dytikon Proastion (English: Lover of Western Suburbs) is a Greek romantic comedy series that aired on Mega Channel during the 2004-2005 season.

== Plot ==
The handsome and popular Spyros, born and raised in western Attica, meets and falls in love with the spoiled and very wealthy Liza, who is used to always getting what she wants. When the two young people manage to come together and admit the intense feelings that bind them, they will find themselves faced with two entire worlds. And that is where their love is tested and proves that its power, when it is true, stands above prejudices and stereotypes.

== Cast ==
- Alexis Georgoulis as Spyros
- Marilita Lampropoulou as Liza
- Christos Nomikos as Miltos
- Arietta Moutousi as Aspasia
- Magda Tsaggani as Maria
- Charis Emmanouil as Michalis
- Stefanos Kosmidis as Kostas
- Christina Kouloumpi as Lena
- Vasilis Palaiologos as Manos
- Alexandros Kompogiorgas as Nikos
- Anta Livitsanou as Gogo
