= M. Karagatsis =

Pen name of Dimitris Rodopoulos, a Greek writer (1908–1960)

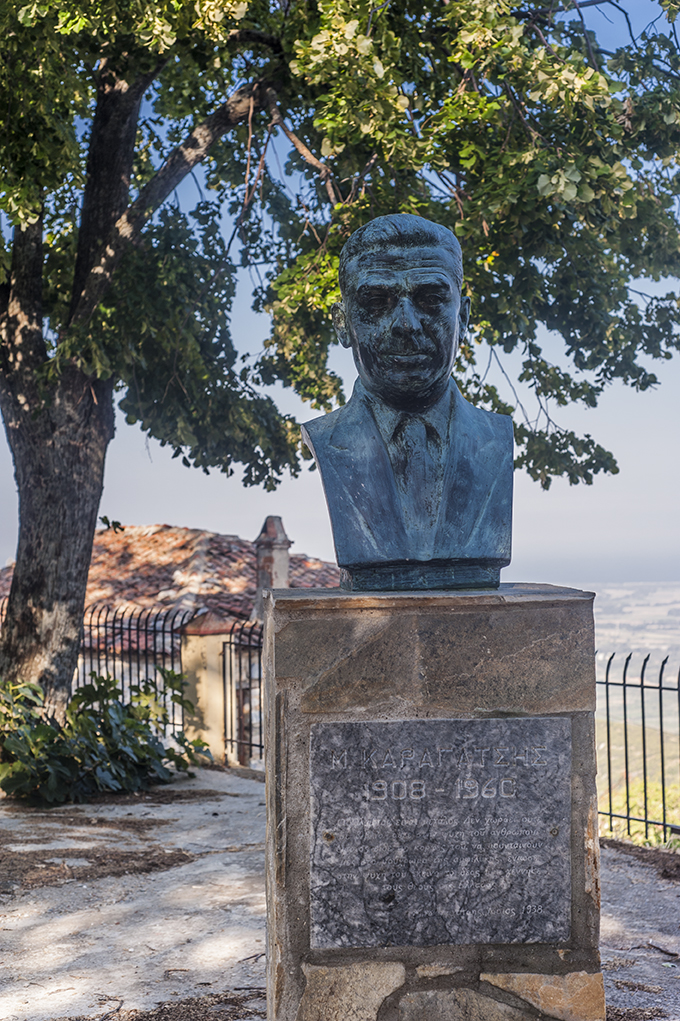
Bust of M. Karagatsis in Rapsani

M. Karagatsis (Greek: Μ. Καραγάτσης; 23 June 1908 – 14 September 1960) was the pen name of the important modern Greek novelist, journalist, critic and playwright Dimitrios Rodopoulos (Δημήτριος Ροδόπουλος). The pen name M. Karagatsis is the name the novelist is known with. The letter "M." comes from Mitya, which is the Russian diminutive of Dimitris (his real name). The word "Karagatsis" comes from the tree karagatsi under the shadow of which he used to write as a young writer.

Karagatsis was born in Athens, grew up in Larissa and Thessaloniki, and studied law in France. He died in Athens.

He is associated with the "Generation of the '30s".

== Evaluation ==
Karagatsis has been characterized as primarily a prose writer of the illusory reality of persons and situations. His writing is bold, sensual, with great imagination and a unique narrative style, and is often studied by Greek students. His first three novels (Colonel Liapkin, Chimaera and Junkermann) compose a trilogy named Acclimazation under Apollo, about foreigners who live and work in Greece. Karagatsis sets these books in modern, cosmopolitan Greece, in contrast with the stereotype that Greek life is conservative and countrified.

== Books ==
Karagatsis is one of the few modern Greek writers to be translated (mainly to German but also English, Italian, French) and his most important works are:

- "Miss Nitsa" (1927) (Η κυρία Νίτσα)
- Colonel Liapkin (1933) (Ο Συνταγματάρχης Λιάπκιν)
- Junkermann (1939) (Γιούγκερμαν)
- The last days of Junkermann (1940) (Τα στερνά του Γιούγκερμαν)
- Lost island (1941) (Χαμένο Νησί)
- The ruler of Kastropyrgos (1944) (Ο Κοτζάμπασης του Καστρόπυργου)
- Great Sleep (1946) (Ο Μεγάλος Ύπνος)
- Bar Eldorado (Stage play, 1946)
- Blood lost and gained (1947) (Αίμα χαμένο και κερδισμένο)
- Carmen (Stage play, 1948)
- History of Greeks (nonfiction, 1952) (Η ιστορία των Ελλήνων)
- The Great Chimera (1953) (Η Μεγάλη Χίμαιρα) (first serialized in a magazine in 1936)
- At God's Hands (1954)
- Death and Thodoros (1956) (Ο Θάνατος κι ο Θόδωρος)
- The Yellow Dossier (1957) (Ο Κίτρινος Φάκελος)
- Sergius and Bacchus (historical fiction, 1959) (Σέργιος και Βάκχος)
- The 10 (1960) (unfinished)

== Media ==
In early 2026, a television adaptation of The Great Chimera (1936) premiered on Greek public broadcaster ERT’s streaming service ERTFLIX and quickly broke viewing records in Greece, reaching over one million views within its first week. The six-part period drama, with an adapted screenplay by Panagiotis Iosifelis, was co-produced with Italian and German partners and directed by Vardis Marinakis.
