= Savvatogennimenes =

- Genre: Comedy
- Written by: Giorgos Kapoutzidis
- Directed by: Pinelopi Krontiropoulou (episode 1-6); Antonis Aggelopoulos (episode 7-33)
- Starring: Eleni Rantou; Katiana Balanika; Rania Schiza; Sakis Boulas
- Theme music composer: Stamatis Giatrakos
- Country of origin: Greece
- Original language: Greek
- No. of seasons: 1
- No. of episodes: 33

Production
- Executive producer: Studio ATA
- Production locations: Athens, Greece
- Camera setup: Multi-camera
- Running time: 37-45 minutes

Original release
- Network: Mega Channel
- Release: September 22, 2003 – July 2, 2004

Savvatogennimenes (English: Saturday-born) is a Greek comedy television series that aired on Mega Channel during the 2003–2004 season. The series was a great success and its popularity grew rapidly over time, resulting in it being rerun systematically by the station after its completion.

Starred by Katiana Balanika, Eleni Rantou, Rania Schiza and Sakis Boulas.

== Plot ==
Savvas Katsikis is a wealthy man who has relationships with women mainly for fun – since he does not like commitments. Despite this, he has been married three times, but has not been faithful to any of his three wives. His first marriage was to a philologist, Kaiti Tonga, his second to actress Bia Bekou, who stars in the soap opera Pyrkagia, and his third to Soula Karagiannidou, a businesswoman who runs a tourist goods store for the Athens 2004 Olympic Games.

During the period when his third divorce is being issued, Savvas, while driving, hears the Joker's lucky numbers on the radio and realizes that he has won 7.5 million euros. From the shock and surprise, he loses control of the car and crashes. He is taken to the hospital, where he is diagnosed with amnesia. The doctors who are taking care of him decide to pick up his cell phone and inform anyone who calls about his condition. His three ex-wives learn the news and arrive at the hospital with difficulty. Unable to help the situation, they decide not to take care of him, due to his bad past. That same night, however, hearing the Joker's lucky numbers on television combined with some scattered words that Savvas said just before he fell unconscious ("It's 19!") and the fact that the winner has not yet shown up to collect the amount, they realize that Savvas is the Joker's big lucky one.

Although the three of them are not on good terms at all, they all move into his house to try to help him remember where the Joker's ticket is, since they were unable to find it, in order to take the money for themselves. While they live together, Savvas becomes a completely different person from the man they knew, slowly making them change their attitude towards him, but also eventually becoming very good friends.

Six months later, and while everyone's lives have completely changed, Savvas still cannot remember anything about the ticket. When everyone takes the first step to move on with their lives by leaving the lost ticket behind, on the last day of the right to cash in the amount, a memory ends the day episodic for everyone.

== Cast ==
- Eleni Rantou as Bia Bekou, actress - former wife of Savvas
- Katiana Balanika as Kaiti Togka, professor - former wife of Savvas
- Rania Schiza as Soula Karagiannidou, merchant - former wife of Savvas
- Sakis Boulas as Savvas Katsikis, rentier
- Vasiliki Andritsou as Sissy, makeup artist in the Fire series
- Antonis Karystinos as Giorgos Petrou, director in the Fire series
- Maria Androutsou as Tamy Tsanaka, actor and member of parliament
- Giorgos Kapoutzidis as José Antonio Marcelino Gutiérrez de Rincon, foreigner - employee of Soula
- Argyris Aggelou as Asimakis Lazarou, student - in love with Kaiti
