= Errikos Litsis =

Greek actor

Errikos Litsis (Greek: Ερρίκος Λίτσης; born 1955 in Athens) is a Greek actor. Errikos is best known for his performance as Dimitris in the 2002 cult movie Matchbox and as Takis in the 2005 film Soul Kicking.

== Selected filmography ==
- Matchbox (2002)
- Tsiou (2005)
- Soul Kicking (2006)
- Ores koinis isyhias (2006)
- Parees (2007)
- Small Crime (2008)
- Kantina (2009)
- Paradise (2011)
- Amerika Square (2016)
- 1968 (2018)
