= Dimitris Lignadis =

Greek actor and director (born 1964)

- Δημήτρης Λιγνάδης
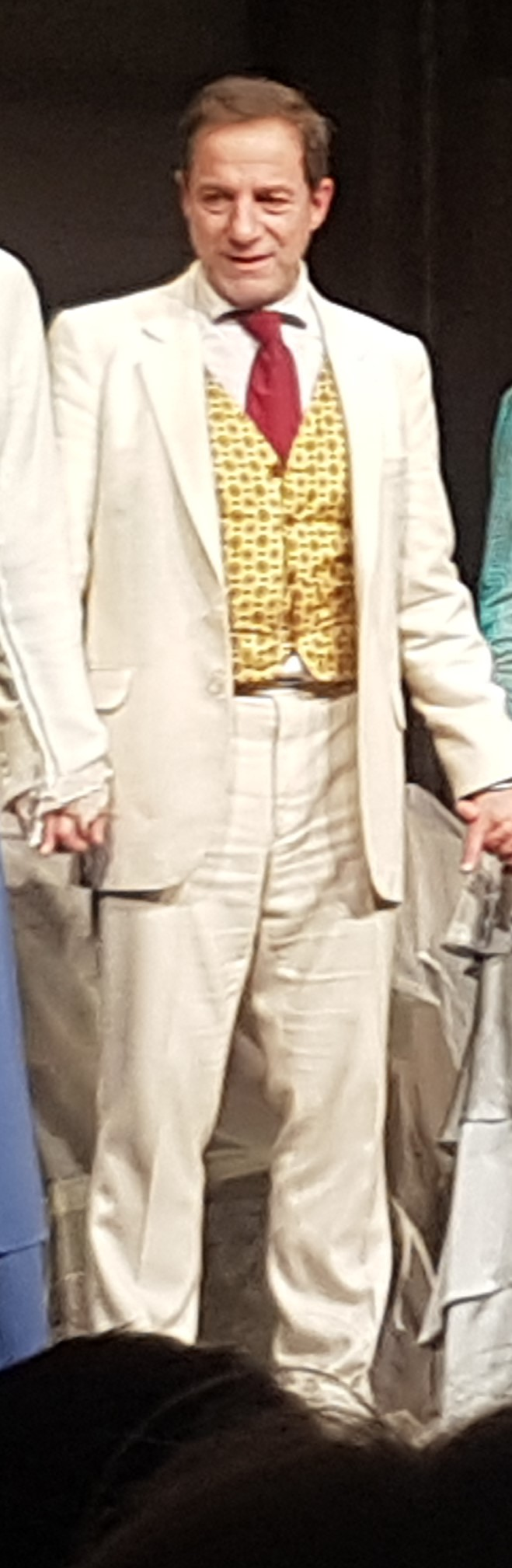
- Born: Δημήτριος Λιγνάδης; September 25, 1964 (age 62); Athens, Greece
- Education: University of Athens; National Theatre of Greece Drama School
- Occupations: Actor stage director
- Criminal charges: Serial rape

Dimitris Lignadis (Greek: Δημήτρης Λιγνάδης; born September 25, 1964) is a Greek actor and stage director, who served as the artistic director of the National Theater of Greece from August 2019 until he resigned on February 6, 2021. Lignadis resigned from his position after sexual abuse statements by minors against him became public. Shortly after, he was arrested, charged and convicted with serial rape of minors but let free due to alleged high connections with government officials.

== Early life and education ==
Dimitris Lignadis was born on 1964 in Athens, Greece to theater critic and author Tasos Lignadis. The young Lignadis studied at the University of Athens and at the National Theatre of Greece Drama School.

== Career ==
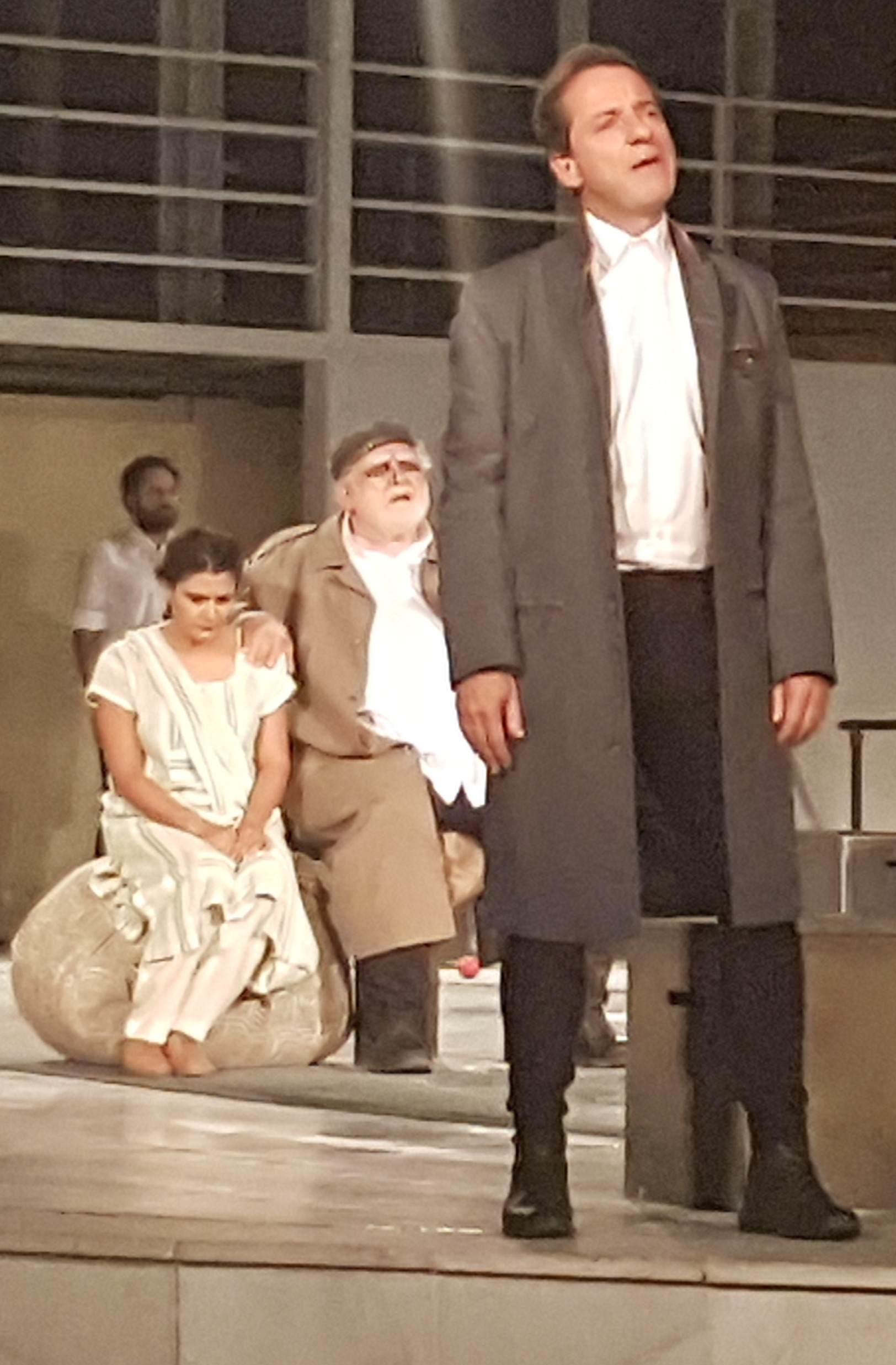
Lignadis on 2017

He has acted in and directed many plays. He served as the artistic director of the National Theater of Greece from August 2019 until he resigned on February 6, 2021.

== Sexual abuse allegations and arrest ==
In February 2021, various sexual abuse allegations against Lignadis became public; some of them by minors. Lignadis resigned from his position on February 6, 2021.

Minister of Culture and Sports Lina Mendoni called Lignadis a "dangerous person" and that "he deceived the Ministry", a statement met with serious backlash from many artists and the Hellenic Actors Union.

Lignadis was eventually arrested and charged with four counts of rape and was placed in pre-trial detention. In July 2022 he was found guilty for two rapes of two -then- minors and was sentenced to serve 12 years in jail. The Court also decided to release him from jail on parole until his appeal hearing takes place. The decision of setting free was taken by a 4–3 majority.
