= Mavra Mesanychta =

- Genre: Black comedy
- Written by: Vasilis Risvas; Dimitra Sakalis
- Directed by: Panos Kokkinopoulos
- Starring: Stelios Mainas; Panagiota Vlanti; Bessy Malfa; Gerasimos Skiadaresis
- Theme music composer: Kyriakos L. Papadopoulos
- Opening theme: "Mavra Mesanychta" (sung by Maria Iakovou feat. Thirio)
- Ending theme: "Mavra Mesanychta"
- Country of origin: Greece
- Original language: Greek
- No. of seasons: 2
- No. of episodes: 48

Production
- Executive producer: Frenzy Films
- Producers: Bessie Voudouris (music) Marios Strofalis
- Cinematography: Kostas Palmas
- Running time: 43-45 minutes

Original release
- Network: Mega Channel
- Release: 7 January 2008 – 2009

Mavra Mesanychta (Greek: Μαύρα Μεσάνυχτα; "Black Midnight") is a Greek black comedy series, originally broadcast on Mega Channel under the executive production of Frenzy Films. It was written by actor and writer Vasilis Risvas (Βασίλης Ρίσβας), who also had one of main roles in the comedy, and writer Dimitra Sakalis (Δήμητρα Σακαλή).

The director of the series was Panos Kokkinopoulos (Πάνος Κοκκινόπουλος), the music producer was Marios Strofalis (Μάριος Στρόφαλης) and the producer Bessie Voudouris (Μπέσυ Βουδούρη). Kokkinopoulos, after several years of cooperation with Alpha TV, chose to include in the series actors who had worked with him in the past, like Stelios Mainas (Στέλιος Μάινας), Panagiota Vlanti (Παναγιώτα Βλαντή), Bessy Malfa (Μπέσυ Μάλφα), Gerasimos Skiadaresis (Γεράσιμος Σκιαδαρέσης).

The theme music was composed by Kyriakos Papadopoulos (Κυριάκος Παπαδόπουλος), with lyrics by pop star Thirio (Θηρίο), who also performs the song alongside singer Maria Iakovou (Μαρία Ιακώβου), having a small part in the series. The theme song became a big success in Greece, one of the reasons for the series having a high number of viewers.

The production manager was Dimitrios Katsaros (Δημήτρης Κατσαρός), the head of stage design Giannis Doumas (Γιάννης Δούμας), the head of costume design Iliostalachti Vavouli (Ηλιοστάλαχτη Βαβούλη), the director of photography Kostas Palmas (Κώστας Πάλμας), the montage responsible Giannis Maris (Γιάννης Μαρής).

== Themes ==
The series shows how a man can turn "from a sheep into a wolf", how money and power can change people or make them change if they do not have any other choice, and how far people are able to go and what they are willing to do and to lose in order to achieve what they want, no matter the cost they have to pay. It shows the reality of the underworld, what really happens backstage and what most people do not know (or do not want to know) about.

== Plot ==
The story is about mafia and family, kitsch and glamour.

Everything starts when Thrasos, a peaceable breadwinner, inherits the fortune of his brother a man of night and owner of a nightclub that was killed by a bomb in his car. Thrasos suddenly from a law abiding citizen becomes the owner of the 95% of a big nightclub and one of the main heads of the underworld against his will.

Thrasos does not want to take his brothers fortune because of the fear that he might end up just like his brother, but his wife Lena, thirsty for money and luxuries, has other plans and forces him to accept the fortune. However, the ambitious Silvy, the lover of Thrasos' brother for many years, received only 5% of the nightclub, which she is not satisfied with, growing willing to do whatever she can to take the power on her own hands. In all that Thrasos will have to deal with the circumstances, and he will start having problems at work, buying off corrupt police officers to take decisions he does not want to, losing his family with the decisions he has made.

== Cast ==
Actor	Role
Stelios Mainas	Thrasos Koutroubas
Panagiota Vlanti	Silvy Bouzani
Bessy Malfa	Lena Koutrouba
Gerasimos Skiadaresis	Apostolis Koutroubas
Ersi Malikenzou	Angela Tsoukatou
Yioulika Skafida	Penny Koutrouba
Vasilis Risvas	Lazaros Ampatzis
Makis Papadimitriou	Jean-Claude / Yiannis Klontakis
Rania Papadakou	Tzia Alevizou
Panagiotis Karmatis	Vasilis Koutroubas
Nikos Nikas	Erikos Gikas
Dimitris Marizas	Nikolas Klontakis
