= List of programs broadcast by the Hellenic Broadcasting Corporation =

The following is a list of programs broadcast by ERT (Ellinikí Radiofonía Tileórasi) television stations. ERT was the Greek television network before the launch of ANT1 and Mega Channel in 1989 as well as ERT2.

== Children's ==
- 1,000 hromata tou Hristou (1,000 χρώματα του Χρήστου) (2019–2022) ERT2
- The Adventures of Tintin (dubbed in Greek) (1991-1993) (broadcast in 2004 and 2018) - ERT2, ERT1
- Alvin and the Chipmunks (dubbed in Greek) (1993) ERT2
- Andy Pandy (2002) (dubbed in Greek) (broadcast in 2003) ERT1
- Animals Antics – [ET-1]
- Barbapapa (1974–1977) (dubbed in Greek) (broadcast in 1981) - ERT1
- Big World for Little People – educational program for children that deals with human interaction, natural science and mathematics; [ET-3]
- Captain Abercromby (2002-2003) (dubbed in Greek) (broadcast in 2002) - ERT1
- Cartoons (dubbed in Greek) (1991–1993) – [ET-1]
- Carussel (dubbed in Greek) – Mexico (1993–1998) [ET-2] [ET-1]
- CatDog (dubbed in Greek) (broadcast in 2001) [ET-1]
- Catweazle (1970-1971) (dubbed in Greek) (broadcast in 1986) - ERT2
- Cebollitas (dubbed in Greek) – Argentina (2000–2006) [ET-1]
- Chiquititas (dubbed in Greek) – Argentina (2002–2004) [ET-1]
- Digby Dragon (2016-2019) (dubbed in Greek) (broadcast in 2021) - ERT2
- FloopaLoo, Where Are You? (2011-2014) (dubbed in Greek) (broadcast in 2020) - ERT2
- Fox and Hare (2018) (dubbed in Greek) (broadcast in 2021) - ERT2
- Franny's Feet (2004) (dubbed in Greek) – Canadian/American animated cartoon series for children; [ET-1]
- Hallo Spencer (1979) (dubbed in Greek with German subtitles, 1997) - ERT1, ERT2
- Heidi (2015-2016) (dubbed in Greek) (broadcast in 2016) - ERT2
- Heidi, Girl of the Alps (1974) (dubbed in Greek) (broadcast in 1981) - ERT1
- Hey Duggee (2014-2023) (dubbed in Greek) (broadcast in 2022) ERT2
- The Intrepids – ERT2
- JoJo & Gran Gran (2020-2022) (dubbed in Greek) (broadcast in 2022) -ERT2
- Kaput & Zösky – ERT1
- Kikirikou – children's TV show; hosted by Sofianos family (1997–1998); [ET-1]
- Kouklomegaloi kai Polysporia/FraPaidia me MarmEllada – children's TV show; hosted by Sofianos family (2002–2005); ERT1
- Le Petit Nicolas (dubbed in Greek) – French/Indian animated cartoon series for children; (2012–2013) [ET-1]
- Lucky Luke (dubbed in Greek) – (1995–2002) ERT1
- Μathimatika Αsteria – children's program designed to teach mathematics in a fun way; ERT3
- Mimi and Mr. Bobo (1999) (dubbed in Greek) (broadcast in 2000) - ERT1, ERT2
- The New Adventures of Lucky Luke (2001-2003) (dubbed in Greek and subtitled version, 2017) ERT2
- The Number Crew – educational program designed to help teach kids aged 5–7 math; ERT3
- The Noddy Shop (dubbed in Greek) – (1999-2001) ERT1
- Ntrin Stop – children's game show; hosted by Fotis Petridis and Olga Michalopoulou (1999–2003); [ET-1]
- Ouranio Toxo – program aimed at pre-schoolers aged 4–6, to prepare them for school; teaches them about the alphabet, numbers, drawing, colours, weather and much more. Hosted by Christos Demopoulos, airs Monday – Friday at 9am; (1986–2013) [ET-1]
- Orzowei (1977) (dubbed in Greek) (broadcast in 1982) - ERT1
- Pablo the Little Red Fox – [ET-1]
- Paidi TV – children's TV show; hosted by Giota Militsi (2002–2003); [ET-1]
- Pop kai pame/Takat tak – children's game shows; hosted by Adam Arnold (2001–2005) [ET-1]
- Puffin Rock (2015-2016) (dubbed in Greek) (broadcast in 2019) - ERT2
- Punky Brewster (1994) [ET-1]
- The Raccoons (1980-1991) (Greek dubbed version, 1992–1994; subtitled version, 1997) [ET-2]
- The Smurfs (1981-1989) (dubbed in Greek) (1984-1999) [ET-1]
- Sesame Street (dubbed in Greek) (1985–2000) ET-1
- Spartakus and the Sun Beneath the Sea (1985-1987) (dubbed in Greek) (broadcast in 1987) - ERT1
- Story of the Alps: My Annette – (dubbed in Greek) (1995-1997) ERT1
- Superhero Kindergarten (2021) (dubbed in Greek) (broadcast in 2023) ERT2
- Teletubbies (2003) – ERT1
- Tilekpedaifsi (2020) ERT2
- Tom and Jerry (1978) – ERT1
- Tweenies – ERT1
- Under the Umbrella Tree (dubbed in Greek) (1990) [ET-2]
- Unser Charly (dubbed in Greek) (2000-2001) [ET-1]
- Yoho Ahoy (2000-2001) (dubbed in Greek) – (2002-2003) ERT1
- The Zig and Zag Show (dubbed in Greek) (broadcast in 2003) [NET]

=== Disney Zone – Disney Channel hours ===
- 101 Dalmatians – [NET]
- Aladdin – [ET-1]-[NET]
- American Dragon – [NET]
- Brandy & Mr. Whiskers – [NET] ET-1
- Chip 'n Dale: Rescue Rangers(subtitled version) [ET-1]-[NET]
- Classic Cartoons – [ET-1]
- Darkwing Duck – [ET-1]
- Disney Channel Original Movies films – [ET-1]-[NET]
- Disney's Adventures of the Gummi Bears – [ET-1]
- Donald Duck Presents – [ET-1]-[NET]
- Doug – [ET-1]
- The Emperor's New School – [ET-1]-[NET]
- Fillmore! – [ET-1]
- Good Luck Charlie – [ET-1]
- Good Morning, Mickey! – [ET-1]-[NET]
- Goof Troop – [ET-1]-[NET]
- Hannah Montana – [ET-1]-[NET]
- Hercules – [ET-1]-[NET]
- Higglytown Heroes – [ET-1]
- House of Mouse – [ET-1]-[NET]
- Jojo's Circus – [ET-1]
- JONAS – [ET-1]-[NET]
- Kim Possible – [NET]
- Lilo & Stitch: The Series – [ET-1]
- The Little Mermaid – [ET-1]
- PB&J Otter – [ET-1]
- Pepper Ann – [ET-1]-[NET]
- Phineas and Ferb – [ET-1]-[NET]
- The Proud Family – [ET-1]-[NET]
- Quack Pack – [NET]
- Recess – [ET-1]-[NET]
- The Replacements – [ET-1]-[NET]
- Shake It Up – [ET1]
- Sonny with a Chance – [ET-1]-[NET]
- The Suite Life of Zack & Cody – [ET-1]
- The Suite Life on Deck – [ET-1]
- TaleSpin – [ET-1]-[NET]
- Tarzan – [NET]
- Teamo Supremo – [ET1]
- Timon & Pumbaa – [NET]
- Walt Disney Pictures films – [NET]
- Weekenders – [ET-1]
- Wizards of Waverly Place – [ET-1]

== Culture ==
- Αlithina Senaria – informative series that takes the viewer around the world to meet people who excel in their respective jobs. From a businessman on Wall Street to a shepherd in Pindos, from an acclaimed journalist to a hermit in Pilios, the show features fascinating people with a story to tell. This program is now in its 5th year and has been the most watched show on ET-3 since its inception. Hosted by Nikos Aslanidis, airs Thursdays at 10pm. [ET-3]
- Apopse Me Ton Terrence Quick – intimate discussion with individuals from various facets of society including the arts, educators, politicians, economists and athletes. They discuss various topics, not related to their profession, such as current events. Hosted by Terrence Quick. [ET-3]
- Axion Esti – a staple on Greek television for 12 years, this program focuses on writers and their works. The new season also includes visits to small towns in the country where host Vasilis Vasilikos meets up with local writers and talks with them about their works and their lives. In addition to writers, guests include painters, sculptors and editors. Airs Mondays at 9:30pm. [ET-3]
- Biblia Sto Kouti – a program about books, whose aim is to guide the viewer by exploring and evaluating authors and their works through a neutral viewpoint; [ET-1]
- Εkti Aisthsi – informative program that focuses on those with disabilities and their way of life. Host Giorgos Beliris, who himself has a disability (deafness), attempts to give the viewer a glimpse into the life of someone with a disability. He informs viewers about the problems that those with disabilities face, their concerns and ambitions to lead a normal life. The show also provides information about legislation, accessibility of public buildings and other issues of interest to those with a disability. [ET-3]
- Ellinika Monoprakta – theatre performances produced for broadcast on television, featuring the works of some of the most well-known and important Greek writers. Shows feature performances by veteran and new stage actors.
- Fotosfaira – documentary series that gives the viewer a look at rural life in Greece. The series focuses on the people, the geography and cultural of the towns and villages in Greece. [ET-1]
- Glossa Mou Dinoun Elliniki – documentary series from the EU program Equal Dream, that is designed to help stop racism and xenophobia. This program takes a look at four children who come from mixed backgrounds (one parent is Greek, the other is not) and how they are dealing with this, growing up in Greece, how they get along with other children, etc. [ET-3]
- Η Εpoxi Ton Eikonon – program dedicated to discussion and analysis of the fine arts; now in its 6th year; hosted by Katerina Zaxaropoulou; [ET-1]
- Η Gynaika Stin Perifereia – a new eight-part series that looks at the lives of women of various ages and professions who live in the country, outside of big cities. It examines their place in society on a personal, social and professional level, the problems they face and how that relates to their surroundings in a rural setting. [ET-3]
- Hotel Triton – classic arts showcase (music, theatre) airs weekly on Fridays; [ET-1]
- The Joy of Painting – American documentary series about art and painting; [ET-3]
- Κyriaki Sto Horio – a journey to different towns and villages across the country, giving viewers a glimpse at life in rural Greece, the traditions, music, culture, history and problems that the residents face. An informative and entertaining program that looks at how those outside the city live. Hosted by Μάρνη Χατζηεμμανουήλ. [ET-3]
- Μegales Parastaseis – arts program, dedicated to showcasing some of the best composers and choreographers who have left their mark in the field where they served; hosted by Alexis Kostalas; [ET-1]
- Μia Poli Ena Vlema – a look at life outside of the big cities, in the towns and villages, the people who live their and the problems they face; [ET-3]
- Μitropoli Tou Kosmou – an examination of different cultures as told through various people from around the world who have chosen Greece as their home. The program examines conditions of life in a metropolitan city like Thessaloniki and culture mecca like Greece. Hosted by Theodora Augeri and Vasilis Kexagias; [ET-3]
- Nistiko Arkoudi – cooking show where the host is not a chef and knows little about cooking (or at least that is what he wants people to believe). Includes visits to various restaurants in Northern Greece where viewers see various dishes prepared and the host attempting to learn how to make them and also sample some food. When a dish is prepared, an explanation of the history of the dish is given as well as dietary information about it. Emphasis is on simple dishes that are healthy and easy to prepare so that people watching can learn how to make them. A guest is featured in each show, who accompanies the host and helps out with the cooking if they know how. Originally hosted by Stathis Pangiotopoulos and Dimitri Starovas, then later by Dimitris Starovas and Maria Arabazti. [ET-3], [NET]
- Οi Μousikoi Tou Kosmou – documentary-style program that travels the globe and provides a look into the happenings from the world of music; [NET]
- On the Loose – nature series filmed in the jungles of Namibia, Kenya and Zimbabwe; [ET-3]
- Οudeis Anamartitos – talk show with an emphasis on culture and the lives of the people from it. In depth interviews with unique and well known individuals from the arts, theatre, music, film, politics and science. Now in its third year, hosted by Anna Panagiotarea. [ET-1]
- Paraskinio – series that focuses on culture and social reflection. A look at various people, their work and their lives and their impact on society. Paraskinio has been a staple on Greece's public broadcaster for 32 years. [ET-1]
- Peri Gis O Logos – a travel program from the Ministry of Agriculture, where host Panagiotis Mauridis takes viewers on scenic trips to the Greek countryside; [ET-3]
- Peristrefomenoi Dervisdes – live theatre performances; [ET-3]
- Rimeik – historical series that looks back on how life in contemporary Greece has changed over the past 30 years. [ET-1]
- Synanthseis – popular journalist, lyricist and writer Leuteris Papadopoulos entertains various guests including singers, writers and composers who have made an impact in the world of music; [ET-1]
- To Syban Pou Agapisa – series that examines life in our fast changing world, specifically the dramatic changes in our social structures as well as the link between the nature and our environment; [ET-3]
- Zoom Sta Prosopa Kai Ta Gegonota – informative discussion that focuses on the people and events that caught our attention in the week past; [NET]

== Documentaries ==
- Al Filo De Lo Impossible – Spanish documentary series that takes viewers on a trip around the world through a look at various non-mainstream sports that focus on team spirit and adventure; an alternative look at the world around us through climbing, flying, explorations and expeditions; [ET-1]
- Animals of South Africa – 13-part documentary series on the wildlife found in Africa; [ET-3]
- The Argonaut – documentary series that journeys to far off lands and takes viewers back in time; [ET-3]
- Αsiatiki Fantasia – documentary about Asian culture as told through visits to various festivals; [ET-3]
- CEO Eexchange – American documentary series, a behind-the-scenes look at the life of a CEO of a major corporation; [ET-3]
- Destinations – documentary-style travel series that explores cities and countries around the world; [ET-3]
- Devil’s Island – the secret worlds of French Guiana; a French documentary series; [ET-3]
- Εxantas – documentary series that looks at issues of interest to open-minded and skeptical citizens from this modern 'globalized' world. Now in its 6th year on NET. Features topics such as the war in Iraq, Beslan school shootings, Chechnya, Paris riots and more. [NET]
- Extraordinary Trains – French documentary series about the world of trains, the passengers, the panoramic views, and the unique cultures of the lands visited; [ET-3]
- Famous Composers – documentary series that looks at the lives of classic composers; [ET-3]
- Filakes Tou Dasous (Keepers of the Forest) – an Italian/French co-production, a documentary about nature; [ET-1]
- Geo geo – Italian documentary series about nature and various spots around the globe; [ET-3]
- Indian Days – Journey To the Blackfoot Tribe – French documentary series about the Blackfoot Indians; [ET-3]
- Journey to the sacred places – Italian documentary series that examines various spots around the world focusing not only on religious aspects but also on culture, tourism and economic characteristics of each place; [ET-3]
- Off the beaten track – French documentary series that visits various places where harsh climates exist, and looks at the residents who live there; [ET-3]
- Oi Ellines Tou Kosmou – a documentary series that focuses on the life of Greeks living abroad. It looks at the history of Greek immigration to other countries and is based on the testimonies of political and economic refugees. Directed by Panos Panagos.
- Oikologia Kai Diatrofi – documentary series about the environment and nutrition, informing viewers about ecological matters such as climate change, energy and alternative tourism. It gives viewers information and tips on leading a better life and preserving the planet for future generations. Hosted by Anastasia Kokkali.
- Rehearsal of the Apocalypse – Russian documentary on the nuclear disaster that occurred on a Soviet military base in 1954; [ET-3]
- Roumania Kai Italia Ton Geuseon – documentary from ERT 3 that looks at racism and xenophobia in the mass media through the eyes of a Romanian woman and an Italian man who live in Greece. The two tell of their struggles and experiences living in a foreign land. [ET-3]
- The Secrets of Winemaking – French documentary series about winemaking; [ET-3]
- Simon Schama's Power of Art – English documentary series, presenting eight famous artists; [ET-1]
- Τa Μarmara Pou Miloun – French documentary series that focuses on archaeology; [ET-3]
- Τa Μystika Ton Vounon – documentary about the secrets of nature and the environment in Italy; [ET-3]
- Thalassa, O Υdatinos Kosmos – documentary series about oceans; [ET-3]
- Thessalonikis Egkomion – 13-part series that looks at the cultural capital of Greece – Thessaloniki; the people, the history, music and theatre as well as the many neighbourhoods; [ET-3]
- To Κathimerino Mas Psomi – 13-part documentary-style series about a household staple – bread. A look at how it is made and its many uses. [ET-3]
- Treasures of the Sacred Art - Tuscan Journeys – documentary series that focuses on Tuscany and its beautiful architecture, museums, churches and wonderful paintings and sculptures; [ET-3]

== Entertainment ==
- Design – lifestyle program that is now in its 13th year on ET-3; describes various topics of interest in the modern world such as architecture, design, the arts and general lifestyle news. Hosted by Aggeliki Triaridou. [ET-3]
- Diaspora – a series that focuses on bridging the gap between Greeks living abroad and Greece. It gives a voice to the omogenia, to tell about their way of life, the problems they face, stories about their experiences and more. A show that will inform and entertain viewers the world around, hosted by Xrisa Samou; airs Saturdays at 3:30pm; [ET-3]
- Dolce Vita – [ET-1]
- Dromoi – biographical series, looking at the lives of famous individuals; [ET-1]
- Εpi Troxon – series that focuses on the latest information about cars and motorcycles, including test drives and reviews of various models for those looking to purchase a new automobile. Also includes news on various motorsports such as Formula 1, Rally World Series, Moto GP and dragster races. Now in its 6th year on ET-3, hosted by Xaris Theofrastou. [ET-3]
- Essis ti lete (1987-1988) - game show based on the American version of Break the Bank. Hosted by Kostas Rigopoulous. [ET-1]
- Imerologia – informational program that features discussions with well-known stars from the world of film, theatre and music about their lives, careers and whatever else comes up. It takes place around Athens in various locals such as restaurants, marketplace and in neighbourhoods. [ET-1]
- Jammin' On (1996–1999) – [ET3]
- Κathe Topos Kai Tragoudi – informative program that presents informative and unknown aspects of traditional Greek song and dance. The show travels all around Greece from small villages to larger towns and cities, examining the musical history of each area. Each area has distinct musical traditions and its ties to the cultural of each area are also documented. Hosted by Giorogs Melikis; [ET-3]
- Koita Ti Ekanes
- Κyriakatiko Trapezi – variety show that features a series of guests together at a table sharing a meal, discussing various issues and enjoying live music with the ten-member in-studio band; now in its 2nd year on NET; hosted by Sotiris Triantafilopoulos
- Logomaxies – game show that features two teams pitted against each other engaging in a lively debate on various interesting and topical issues; [ET-1]
- Longitude – British import series that follows the lives of two men who lived in different times but shared the common goal of realizing their dreams; [ET-1]
- Mediterraneo – travel program that focuses on the Mediterranean region, examining the culture, history and the land of this vast and dynamic area; [ET-1]
- Mousiki Paradosi – music program that showcases traditional song and dance from all the regions in Greece; hosted by Panagiotis Milonas; [ET-1]
- Pame Kala – informative and entertaining lifestyle show that airs weekday afternoons. The program deals with and focuses on the topics of travel, theatre, shopping, books, dance, fashion, sport, Internet, technology, cars and design. Hosted by Zoi Krovaki.
- Plus and Minus (Syn kai Plyn) – [NET]
- Pos Ton Len' To Potamo – game show; features two teams of three players answering knowledge-testing questions and engaging in charades. Winning team receives monetary prize but the focus is on having a good time. Hosted by Dimitra Papadopoulou and Christoforos Zaralikos. [NET]
- Rythmoi kad Dromoi (Rhythm and Roads)
- Se Χrono ΤV – informative show that looks at the history of Greek television and mixes the old with the new. It takes viewers back in time to revisit countless great moments in TV history and blends that with clips from entertainers of today. [ET-1]
- Sinemania – series that focuses on the world of cinema and attempts to distinguish between reality and fiction (like in the movies) through a series of skits. Now in its 8th year, hosted by Nikos Goulias. [ET-3]
- Sta Akra – one-on-one discussions with various well-known people from various walks of life; hosted by Biki Flessa; [NET]
- Stin Ygeia Mas (since 2005) – first broadcast in late 2005
- Taxidevontas me tin Magia Tsokli – travel program that aired for ten successful seasons on NET. Magia Tsokli travels the world giving viewers a look at fascinating people and places. [NET]
- Tois Μetritois – game show; features two teams of three players who answer a series of questions and compete for a prize of 3000 Euro in cash. At the beginning of the show, the members of each team compete as one, helping each other with the questions. But as the game progresses they then compete for themselves and try and win the money. Also, in a first for Greek television, viewers watching at home, have the chance to win a cash prize as well. Hosted by Spiros Papadopoulos. (2004–2007) [NET]
- Who Wants to be a Millionaire? (Greek version), originally aired on Mega, then moved to ERT. Hosted by Spiros Papadopoulos. (2002–2004); [NET, ET-1]
- Ωraioi Ωs Εllines – biographical series that takes a look at the lives of famous and talented individuals from various walks of life including academics, the arts, politics, music and sport. Profiles include Greeks as well as those from other countries around the world. Hosted by Sofia Tsiligianni. [ET-3]
- flERT - gossip, hosted by Nantia Kontogiorgi (ERT-1)
- Des kai vres - game show, hosted by Nickos Kouris

=== Serials ===
- Αpostolos Kai Monos – drama starring Giorgos Michalakopoulos, Giorgos Moschidis; [NET]
- Η Κatallili Stigmi – romantic comedy starring Kleon Grigoriadis, Eleni Kastani, Kostas Triantafyllopoulos, Angeliki Dimitrakopoulou; [NET]
- Karmelita – drama; [ET-3]
- Μoni Ex Ameleias – drama; [NET]
- Ο Thisauvros Tis Aggelinas – drama starring Ntina Konsta, Sofoklis Peppas, Ilias Logothetis; [NET]
- Οikogenia Zarnti
- Τa Paidia Tis Niovis – drama starring Gregoris Valtinos, Angela Gerekou, Angelos Antonopoulos; [NET]
- Amyna Zonis – detective fiction starring Minas Hatzisavvas, Sofia Seirli, Kostas Triantafyllopoulos, Antonis Kafetzopoulos; [ET1]
- To Synergeio (The Garage)
- I zoi en tafo - drama (ERT-1)
- I tourta tis mamas (Mum's cake)- comedy with Kaiti Konstantinou, Kostas Koklas, Lydia Fotopoulou, Ioanna Pilichou, Thanos Lekkas, Paris Thomopoulos, Michalis Papadimitriou, Thanasis Mavrogiannis, Chrysa Ropa and Alexandros Rigas (ERT1)
- Ta kalitera mas hronia (Our better years) - comedy with Meletis Ilias, Katerina Papoutsaki, Yvonni Maltezou, Jenny Theona, Manolis Gkinis, Americo Mellis, Ektoras Fertis, Errikos Litsis, Renos Charalampidis, Michalis Ikonomou and Vasilis Charalampopoulos (ERT1)
- Haireta mou ton Platano (Say hello to Platanos) - comedy with Petros Filippidis (Until episode 87), Tasos Chalkias (Since episode 89), Tasos Kostis and Alexandros Mpourdoumis (ERT1)
- Zaketa na pareis (Get a jacket) - comedy with Eleni Rantou, Dafni Lamprogianni and Foteini Mpaxevani (ERT1)

== Foreign ==
- Biography – content from The Biography Channel (airs Monday – Friday); [ET-1]
- The Blue Bicycle – drama based on the best-selling novel; [ET-3]
- The Bold and the Beautiful – American soap opera (airs Monday-Friday); [ET-3]
- CSI: NY – [NET]
- Desperate Housewives – [NET]
- Discovery Psychology – 26-part series that gives a general view of historical and modern theories surrounding human behaviour; [ET-3]
- Downton Abbey (2012–2013) [NET]
- Dying To Kill: Female Suicide Bombers (documentary) [ET-1]
- Eurovision Song Contest (aired every May) [ERT1]
- Extreme Force (ΠΕΡΑ ΑΠΟ ΤΑ ΟΡΙΑ) [ET-1]
- Floricienta – Argentinian telenovela (airs Wednesday); [ET-1]
- The History Channel – content from the History Channel (airs Monday – Friday); [ET-1]
- The Lone Ranger (1967) [ET-1]
- Lonely Planet – documentary, partly dubbed in Greek for the narrator (2001); [NET]
- Lucifer – Police procedural comedy drama [ERT1]
- MacGyver (1992)
- Magnum, P.I.
- Miami Vice
- Murdoch Mysteries ERT2
- The New Addams Family – [NET]
- Peyton Place – [NET]
- Queen of Swords – [NET]
- Rebelde Way – Argentinian telenovela (airs Wednesday); [ET-1]
- Ultimate Journeys (ΑΠΙΘΑΝΟΙ ΠΡΟΟΡΙΣΜΟΙ) (airs Monday, Wednesday and Thursday); [ET-1]
- The Young and the Restless – American soap opera (airs Monday-Friday); [ET-1]
- Zorro – [ET-3]

== News and information ==
- 9 Η Ωra... Μesimeriase! – informative program that uses wit and humor to discuss various social and cultural issues. The show is divided into various segments devoted to specific topics:

«Ο κύριος αρμόδιος» – a look at issues of everyday life, with live reports on location as well as in studio
«Το πρώτο θέμα» – a look at regional issues with an emphasis on Northern Greece
«Σε άλλη διάσταση» – a look at social issue but from a different perspective
«Τι μας είπαν...» (χθες) – reports from national politics as well as the local scene
«χARTης» των ημερών – airs Monday to Friday at 9am. A look at cultural events from another viewpoint. Hosted by Μελίνα Καραπαναγιωτίδου-Γιάννης Κυφωνίδης. [ET-3]

- Αnixneuseis – current affairs program that examines geopolitical developments from around the world. Technology and major discoveries surrounding the issues form part of the discussion. Host Pantelis Sabbidis and his panel of guests attempt to highlight and answer any questions viewers may have regarding the topics of discussion. Anixneuseis is now in its 11th season on [ET-3].
- Apo ton Freud sto Diadiktyo – a weekly retrospective look back at the big moments of the previous century, taken from the program As Today in the 20th Century; [ET-1]
- Bouli Ton Ellinon – coverage of parliamentary sessions; [ET-1]
- E-Life – program that deals with technology and seek to inform the viewer about all the latest happenings and gadgets that can make their lives easier. The show focuses mainly on those areas that deal with communication and information such as the Internet, cell phones, and video games. There is a companion website for the show where viewers can find information about everything reported on the program and they have the ability to express their views, give comments about the show and more. Hosted by Sakis Koutsouridis. [ET-3]
- Ehoume Kai Leme – daily talk show presented by one woman who discuss various issues from a female perspective. Topics range from serious social issues to more light-hearted fare such as popular culture and gossip. Hosted by Rika Vagianni. [ET-1]
- Εkpaideutiki Thleorasi – educational programs including music, culture and history; [ET-1]
- Ellada Dynami Anthropias – a look at the humanitarian and developmental action of Greece in various third-world countries; [ET-1]
- Εpistimi Κai Σymptoseis (Serendipity) – series that explores scientific progress and its revolutionary effect on the world of medicine; [ET-3]
- ΕΡΤ Ειδήσεις (ERT News) – Daily newscast, with national and international news. Airs at 6:00, 12:00, 15:00, 18:00, 21:00 (main newscast) and 0:00 midnight.
- Exandas Documentary Series – multi-awarded documentary program directed by Yorgos Avgeropoulos (2004–); NET
- Εxistorein & Istorein – political programme that features one-on-one interviews with current and former politicians as well as journalists who concentrate on political matters. Invited guests discuss political matters and their experiences in political office. Also, a look at events shaping modern history. Hosted by Giannis Tzanetakkos.
- EURODOC - ΕΥΡΩΠΗ 2013 – new programme focusing on the European Union and Greece's role in it. The first part of the show features a documentary on life in the EU with a focus on issues such as the environment, health and society. The second part of the show involves a discussion with various guests regarding Greece's role in the 'new' Europe. Hosted by Giorgos Kouvaras and Periklis Vasilopoulos.
- Focus – informative documentary series that airs weekly on NET. National and international issues are examined and investigated by a team of reporters who seek to uncover aspects that were previously unknown. Focus is governed by and the validity of the program is based on the answering of the five basic journalistic questions – who, what, when, where and why. [NET]
- Gaia Elliniki – news and information about the agriculture industry in Greece; [ET-1]
- Η Αlli Opsi – informative show that examines the world of politics and public life from a different perspective. It features discussions with politicians and others in the public eye, a look at their lives, stories from the past and journeys into places and events. [NET]
- H Zoi Einai Paixnidi – talk show that informs and entertains viewers at the same time. Topics of discussion vary from social issues to health to economic matters to the arts and more. The main focus of the show is on real-life stories involving everyday people. The program will take viewers on an emotional roller coaster; they will be informed, educated, and challenged to think; they will laugh, cry and be inspired by what they see and hear. Hosted by Anna Drouza. [NET]
- Ideas – a new program featuring discussions about the art of leadership, the forms it manifests itself in and innovations that it brings about. Hosted by Professors Antonis Makrydimitris and Dimitris Dimitrakos. [ET-1]
- Κoinovoulio Aixmis – show about Greek parliament, where questions are posed to various political figures; [ET-1]
- Lavyrinthos (Labyrinth) – weekly program that deals with politics and features a discussion on issues of importance that are making headlines. Economic and policy debates as some of the topics discussed, with live reports and a focus on regional issue affecting Thessaloniki and all of Northern Greece. Hosted by Alexandros Triantafillidis; airs Thursdays at 11pm; [ET-3]
- Logo Timis – financial news and information for consumers; deals with issues affecting individuals and families such as lifestyle, technology and gadgets, government spending and more; [ET-1]
- Μe Αreti Κai Tolmi – series about the military, in association with the Ministry of Defence; [ET-1]
- Μe Μia Τriti Μatia – current affairs program with an emphasis on politics; attempts to discuss the issues with a valid and unbiased view. It features analysis, in depth discussions and reports on the political and economic issues that are making headlines. Now in its 11-year. Hosted by Kostas Bliatkas. [ET-3]
- Μin Patate To Prasino – informative program with focus on the environment; includes tours of nurseries, botanical gardens, parks and other various green spaces in Greece. Hosted by Giannis Kalamitsis. [ET-1]
- Μonogramma – one of the longest running series on Greek television; has been on the air for over 25 years; a biographical series that looks back on the lives of some of the best-known figures of our times. The series profiles individuals from the world of politics, the arts, religion and society in general. [ET-1]
- Ο Horos Ton Apandesion – intimate one-on-one discussion with various personalities from the arts, politics, higher education, sports and more. Hosted by Thanasis Lalas. [ET-1]
- Paraskeuvi Kai 12 – entertaining and informative late night talk show. Features discussions with people who have something fascinating to relate, whether it be about their lives, their work or their experiences. Guests include athletes, singers, actors, academics, journalists and others with interesting stories to tell. Hosted by Rika Bagianni; airs Fridays at midnight; [NET]
- Press – current affairs program that features discussion on various issues and the headlines of the day. Each week a panel of guests focuses on one specific issue and provides an analysis of this topic. Hosted by Konstantino Zoula. [NET]
- Psifiaki Ellada – new program about technology and the Internet. Its aim is to familiarize people with new technologies that are part of everyday life. Hosted by Nikos Vasilakos. [ET-1]
- Rantevou Stis 8 – morning show which informed viewers about all the relevant issues affecting their lives, from political and social matters to cultural issues and sports headlines. Also included a look at regional issues with an emphasis on Northern Greece. The program focused on Thessaloniki, where it was broadcast from. Hosted by Μελίνα Καραπαναγιωτίδου-Γιάννης Κυφωνίδης. [ET-3]'
- Reportaz Horis Synora – current affairs program that broadcast feature documentaries on various international and domestic issues. The series focused on historical as well as current social and political events, told through the experiences of key players as well as everyday people. It was an award-winning program that was on the air for 13 years. Hosted by Stelios Kouloglou. (1996–2008) [ET-1]
- Ston Kosmo Tis Oikonomias – informative program about the economy and other financial matters, presented in partnership with the Washington Times; [ET-1]
- Τa Εn Dimo Εn Οiko... – informative program that deals with issues from a local perspective, concerns and problems people face in their day-to-day lives. Also a look at the initiatives of regional governments and issues facing municipalities, towns and villages and even neighbourhoods. Hosted by Synthia Sapika; airs Sundays at 2:30pm; [ET-3]
- Τaxideuontas Me To Ayrio – a series that looks at the latest developments from the fields of science and technology; [NET]
- Thematiki Bradia – a series that focuses on a different topic of interest each week, entertaining and informing audiences. Topics of discussion vary from current events as well as social issues, history, health and biographies of well-known personalities. Topics are presented through documentaries, interviews and testimonials and the use of cinematic films.
- Υgeia Gia Olous – informative program that deals with health issues. Host Μihalis Κefalogiannis along with expert guests discuss various topics surrounding one's health and attempt to give practical suggestions and solutions on how to deal with certain problems and on prevention. [NET]
- Yparxei... Eidisi – daily current affairs program that focuses on issues surrounding politics, the economy and cultural matters. The program includes a discussion about a key political issue with invited guests, examination of financial matters in terms everyone can understand, a look at cultural issues and issues of interest to youth. Hosted by Christo Gianouli and Christina Kalimeri. [ET-3]
- Zitima Ygeias – program dealing with health-related matters; [ET-3]

== Religion ==
- Αrontariki – discussion about social issues with Metropolitan Dimitriados Ignatios and guests; [ET-1]
- Theia Leitourgia – coverage of Sunday Mass, airs on [ET-1] and [ET-3]

== Sports ==
=== Programs ===
- Athlitiki Kyriaki (Sports Sunday) – sports highlight show, that features a wrap up of the weekend's games from soccer, basketball and other sports from Greece and abroad. Hosted by Vasilis Mpakopoulos; airs Sundays at 11pm; [ERT1]. When there is a matchday of Super League Greece in midweek, the show airs every Wednesday at 10pm known as Athlitiki Tetarti (Sports Wednesday).
- O Kosmos ton Spor (The World of Sports) daily sports show, airs every afternoon [ERT3]

=== Rights ===
==== Current ====
===== Greece =====
Sports	Competition/Tournament	Summary
Association football
Association football	Greek Cup	Final Only in delay broadcast
Basketball	Greek Basket League	
Basketball	Greek Basketball Cup	
Basketball	Greek Basketball Super Cup	
Volleyball	Greek Volley League	

===== International =====
Sports	Country/Region	Competition/Tournament	Summary
Association football	Worldwide	FIFA World Cup (except 2022)	All 104 matches live
Association football	Worldwide	2022 FIFA U-20 Women's World Cup	Semi-Finals, 3rd Place match and Final only live on ERT Sports HD on ERTFLIX platform
Association football	Worldwide	UEFA Women's Euro 2022	Final only live on ERT Sports HD on ERTFLIX platform
Association football	Europe	UEFA European Championship (except 2020)	All 52 matches live
Association football	Europe	UEFA Europa League	Final only live on ERT1
Association football	Europe	UEFA Europa Conference League	Final only live on ERT1
Athletics	Worldwide	World Athletics Championships	
Athletics	Worldwide	World Athletics U20 Championships	
Athletics	Worldwide	Wanda Diamond League	
Athletics	Worldwide	World Athletics Indoor Championships	
Athletics	Europe	European Athletics Championships	
Athletics	Europe	European Athletics Indoor Championships	
Aquatics	Worldwide	FINA World Championships	
Aquatics	Europe	LEN European Aquatics Championships	
Aquatics	Europe	European Water Polo Championship	
Basketball	Europe	EuroBasket 2022	
Volleyball	Europe	CEV Men's EuroVolley	Greece's matches on qualifiers live
Volleyball	Europe	CEV Women's EuroVolley	Greece's matches on qualifiers live

==== Multi-Sport Events ====
Country/Region	Event	Summary
Worldwide	Olympic Games	Both Summer and Winter. All sports live
Europe	European Championships	All sports live
Europe	European Games	All sports live
