= Bank Bang =

- Directed by: Argyris Papadimitropoulos
- Starring: Vassilis Charalambopoulos; Marissa Triandafyllidou; Dimitris Imelos; Kostas Voutsas
- Release date: 18 December 2008
- Running time: 97 minutes
- Country: Greece
- Language: Greek

Bank Bang is a 2008 Greek comedy film directed by Argyris Papadimitropoulos.

== Plot ==
The story of the film revolves around two brothers Mixalis and Nodas who run a funeral office constantly making plans about how to make a lot of money. However, Nodas is in trouble with the Greek mafia and owes them a large sum of money. He suggests to Mixalis to start robbing banks in order to pay off his debt. Things start getting complicated when the chief of police, in order to deal with the rising number of bank robberies, places undercover police officers in every bank in the country. The situation goes out of control when Mixalis falls in love with a bank employee who has a rather graphical family life.

== Casting ==
- Kostas Voutsas as Ermolaos
- Vassilis Charalambopoulos as Mixalis
- Dimitris Imelos as Nodas
- Marisa Triantafilidou as Lena
- Katerina Mavrogeorgi as Mina
- Mixalis Iatropoulos as Makis
- Gerasimos Skiadaresis as Kostas
- Dimitris Mavropoulos as Bazoukas
- Tzeni Botsi as Katia
- Thanos Samaras as Doukas
- Skotis Drosos as Sam
- Ieronimos Kaletsanos
- Giannis Tsimitselis
- Fanis Mouratidis
- Orfeas Avgoustidis

== Awards ==
List of awards and nominations
Award	Category	Recipients and nominees	Result
2010 Hellenic Film Academy Awards	Best First Film Director	Argyris Papadimitropoulos	Won
