= Vassilis Charalampopoulos =

Vassilis Charalampopoulos may refer to:

- Vassilis Charalampopoulos (actor), Greek actor
- Vassilis Charalampopoulos (basketball), Greek basketball player
