= Vasilis Charalampopoulos =

The name Vasilis Charalampopoulos may refer to:

- Vassilis Charalampopoulos (basketball), Greek basketball player
- Vassilis Charalampopoulos (actor), Greek actor
