= Taxidevontas stin Ellada =

- Genre: Documentary
- Written by: Magia Tsokli
- Directed by: Hronis Pehlivanidis
- Starring: Magia Tsokli
- Country of origin: Greece
- Original language: Greek
- No. of seasons: 5

Production
- Production location: Greece
- Cinematography: Hronis Pehlivanidis
- Production company: Onos Productions

Original release
- Network: ERT

Taxidevontas stin Ellada (Greek: Ταξιδεύοντας στην Ελλάδα; English: Travelling in Greece) is a Greek television travelling documentary series airing on ERT. Magia Tsokli's journeys were initially concentrated on Greece, but they later included places linked with Greek history and culture, outside of the Greek borders, such as Alexandria, Imvros and Cappadocia. The series premiered in the season 1999–2000 and continued for 5 consecutive seasons until 2003–04. From 2004 the series continued with the title Travelling with Magia Tsokli to destinations all around the globe.

== Episodes ==
   Mainland Greece

- Acheloos I
- Acheloos II
- Evrytania
- From Serres to lake Kerkini
- 15th of August in Pindos, Metsovo
- Kavala
- Kastoria
- Mount Grammos
- Mastorochoria
- Ioannina
- Zagori
- Vikos
- Drama
- Xanthi
- Evros river:
  From Alexandroupoli to Adrianoupoli
- Chalkidiki
- Valia Kalda
- Grevena
- Florina
- Nymfaio
- Mount Olympus
- Nafpaktos
- Aigialeia
- Messinian Mani
- Mount Taygetus

   Greek islands

- Corfu (city)
- Corfu, Diapontia Islands
- Santorini I
- Santorini II
- Rhodes & Symi
- Tinos
- Nisyros
- Chios - Oinousses
- Mytilene (city)
- Lesvos I
- Northern Lesvos
- Lemnos
- Patmos
- Amorgos
- Anafi
- Sikinos
- Folegandros
- Kastelorizo
- Thasos & Pangaio
- Crete I
- Crete II
- Ydra
- Kymi
- Paxi & Tzoumerka
- Samos

  Abroad

- Constantinople
- Mount Sinai
- Alexandria
- Cairo
- Imvros
- Cappadocia
- Mikra Asia Ι: Troy, Tenedos & Ayvalık
- Mikra Asia II: Smyrna
- Mikra Asia ΙII: Ephesus, Bodrum
- Albania: Vouliarati (Bularat), Argyrokastro (Gjirokastër),
  Antigonia, Vanista (Vanistër), Dervitsani (Derviçan)
- Monastiri (Bitola)
- From Xanthi to the Pomakochoria of Bulgaria
- Baltic Sea: Gdańsk, Kaliningrad,
  Stockholm, Helsinki, Tallinn
