= Dead Europe (novel) =

2005 novel by Christos Tsiolkas

- First Edition Cover
- Author: Christos Tsiolkas
- Language: English
- Genre: Novel
- Publisher: Vintage (first ed.), Penguin Random House
- Publication date: 18 June 2005
- Publication place: Australia
- Media type: print
- Pages: 411
- ISBN: 978-0-14379-096-9
- Dewey Decimal: A823.91

Dead Europe is a 2005 magical realist, Gothic novel written by Australian author Christos Tsiolkas. It is his third novel and was published by Vintage Random House.

The novel primarily follows its protagonist Isaac Raftis' experiences as he travels across Europe in the early 2000s. It also chronicles the story of his grandfather Michaelis and grandmother Lucia's lives in their rural Greek village in the years surrounding World War II.

At the time of release the novel was met with significant controversy regarding its depiction of historical and contemporary anti-Semitism, with some critics arguing that the text itself represented an example of anti-Semitism. It has also received various literary accolades including Book of the Year from The Age.

== Plot summary ==
The novel is structured in chapters alternately focusing on a realist depiction of Isaac's travels in contemporary Europe and a fantastical representation of his grandparents' lives in their rural World War II era village in Greece.

Dead Europe opens with a flashback of protagonist Isaac Raftis' childhood, when his mother first told him about "the Jews" and how every year, at Christmas they "drank the blood of the sacrificed child."

The novel then transitions to an account of Isaac's grandmother Lucia's childhood, and her abuse at the hands of her father before she is given to Isaac's grandfather Michaelis as a bride. The chapter ends with Michaelis agreeing to shelter Elia, the son of a Jewish acquaintance, from the Nazis in return for a box of jewellery.

Isaac is staying in Athens, where he is holding a mostly unsuccessful and frustrating exhibition of his photographic work. While in Athens he assists a young immigrant boy who has been bashed and meets his family who live in squalor in the ghettos of the city.

In WW2 era rural Greece, Lucia is distraught at her inability to bear a child for Michaelis and has become bitter towards her family and community. She visits Elia, who is hiding in a basement under an abandoned church, to bring him food and they have sex.

Next, Isaac meets up with his cousin Giulia and her boyfriend Andreas. Together they make the journey to visit his grandparents' village. There he takes photographs of the deteriorating village and eventually discovers from a local that his "mother's family is cursed."

Michaelis is convinced by Lucia that, due to the village's wartime famine, they can no longer look after Elia and instead must "murder that fiend we have been protecting." Michaelis complies with Lucia's wishes and stabs Elia to death in the mountains.

Issac's travels have taken him to Venice, where he develops the photos he took of his grandparents' village. To his surprise, in the background of each photo is a "haggard and lean" young man who had not been there when the photos were taken. Later, he meets a mute Jewish man who takes him on a tour through the ghettos of Venice, and urges him to document the antisemitic graffiti they find there.

Back in the Greek village, Lucia and Michaelis now have two children, a son Christaki and a daughter Reveka. Since the birth of their son, no other boy born in the village has reached the age of four. Maritha, Michaelis' mother, knows this is due to a demon feeding on the other children in the village. In an attempt to lift the curse, she smothers Christaki before dying herself.

Next Isaac visits Prague where he reconnects with old friend Sal Mineo, who has abandoned his photographic art to become a pornographer working for Syd "the King Kike of Prague", a pimp and a pedophile. He meets Syd, visits a porn shoot and watches a depraved performance at a sex club. He begins to suffer from a strange sickness, an inability to eat and a craving for blood that he associates with the presence of the phantom child from his photographs.

Lucia, driven mad by her son's death at the hands of her mother-in-law, informs on rebel activity in the village to the local Colonel of the Greek Army. At the end of the chapter, she is murdered by rebels for her betrayal.

In Paris, Isaac meets with Gerry, an old friend of his father's who has become a people smuggler. He tries to convince Isaac to help him smuggle a young immigrant woman, Sula, into Australia, but Isaac refuses. Isaac has a tense dinner with Gerry and his wife Anika, which ends with Gerry brutally attacking his wife. For a reason unbeknownst to him, Isaac feels compelled to drink Anika's blood, and when he does he feels his sickness dissipate.

Following Lucia's murder, Michaelis moves to Australia with his daughter Reveka. At school Reveka is severely bullied for being a "dirty wog" but is protected by her imaginary friend Angelo. After a particularly brutal incident, Reveka wishes that "they were all dead" and the bullies begin to die one by one, much like the children in the village. Following this Michaelis takes her to Dora, a local mystic, who performs an exorcism on her and reveals Angelo to be the cursed spirit of Elia.

In London Isaac reconnects with Sam, an old teacher of his, and stays at his home. The curse is starting to overpower him, and he feels a constant sickness that can only be allayed by drinking blood. He prowls through the streets of London searching for victims, eventually murdering and feeding on an American tourist, before being joined by the spectral boy who lays alongside him.

In the novel's final chapter, Isaac's mother Reveka and boyfriend Colin are informed that Isaac is deathly sick in a London hospital. Together they fly to England to join him. Reveka recognises that her son's affliction is caused by the curse, and feeds him her blood to sustain him, then takes him home to Melbourne. Back home, Reveka prays to God, promising that if her son is saved, "the Devil can take [her] soul." Isaac recovers from his sickness, but in return the curse is passed back to Reveka, who now understands that she will be haunted by the spectre "for all of time, for all of eternity."

== Characters ==
=== Major characters ===
- Isaac Raftis: A second generation Greek-Australian who embarks on a trip through to Europe to present his photographic work, reconnect with old friends and discover more about his heritage. During his travels he becomes afflicted with a strange sickness and is preyed upon by a malevolent spirit.
- Michaelis Panagis: Isaac's grandfather, born into poverty he travels to America to make his fortune before returning to marry Lucia. He shelters a young Jewish boy named Elia, at the request of the boy's father before eventually murdering him at Lucia's urging, unleashing a multi-generational curse upon his family.
- Lucia Panagis: Isaac's grandmother, "the most beautiful woman in Europe" who begins an illicit relationship with Elia, before urging Michaelis to murder him to hide her shame.
- Elia: The young Jewish boy sheltered and ultimately murdered by Michaelis. He returns as a vengeful, vampiric spectre to haunt and prey upon their family, latching on to Isaac during his travels.
- Reveka Raftis: Isaac's mother, who was similarly afflicted by the curse during her childhood.
- Colin: Isaac's boyfriend who he has left behind in Australia while he travels across Europe.

=== Recurring Characters ===
- Vassili Raftis: Isaac's deceased father, an ardent communist and heroin addict. He is referred to only in flashbacks.
- Sophie Raftis: Isaac's younger sister in Australia.
- Giulia: Isaac's cousin living in Greece.
- Andreas Kalifakis: Giulia's boyfriend who represents Isaac's first encounter with contemporary European antisemitism.
- Signor Bruno: Isaac's first male lover who he met at thirteen, an effeminate and much older gay man who teaches him about his sexuality.
- Paul Ricco: The first man Isaac fell in love with, a forty-one-year-old father of three who was friends with Isaac's father Vassili.
- Maritha Panagis: Michaelis' mother, a mistrusted member of the village who can "see the spirit world."
- Sal Mineo: A close friend from Isaac's university days who has made a career shooting pornography in Prague.
- Syd: the "King Kike of Prague", Sal Mineo's employer and the owner of a pornography empire in Eastern Europe.
- Gerry: A Jewish people smuggler living in Paris and old friend of Vassili's. He requests that Isaac assist him in smuggling a young illegal immigrant woman to Australia.
- Sam: A former teacher of Isaac's now living in London who identifies Isaac's deteriorating state and contacts his family.

== Themes ==
=== Anti-Semitism ===
One of the major themes that Dead Europe explores is the nature of anti-Semitism in Europe, in both historic and contemporary contexts. This is foregrounded Tsiolkas's interview with Catherine Padmore when he describes his desire to write a book that "explores anti-Semitism in my world and the complexity of how we deal with it and what it means for our sense of self." The novel attempts to confront anti-Semitism's social and structural components by forcing the reader to re-examine their own attitudes towards Jewish people. Early in his journey, Tsiolkas's point of view character Isaac is disgusted by the anti-Semitism displayed by other non-Jewish characters, but as the novel progresses his "reactions to these pronouncements weaken", and by the end the reader is "trapped in the persona of an apparently well-meaning man who has gradually transformed into a genocidal anti-Semite." Padmore argues that this focused point of view denies the reader the ability to look away, making them identify with and become complicit in Isaac's actions and thoughts, therefore preventing them the reflex of "saying the racist is the other." Tsiolkas himself has condemned the "level of dishonesty" in European culture regarding the anti-Semite who "seemed to always be the other... never who we are" and sought to correct this representation in his own work.

=== Post-Communist Capitalism in Europe ===
Another significant theme explored in the novel is how the spread of global capitalism (particularly to former USSR controlled nations) affected the cultures and economies of various European nations. Of particular concern to Tsiolkas is how capitalism and neoliberalism have facilitated the exploitation of vulnerable groups; such as illegal migrant workers, refugees and sex workers. The novel critiques the apparent lack of action being taken to rectify the social and economic inequalities faced by these exploited groups, and in doing so posits that this underclass may actually be necessary to the functioning of global capitalism. Tsiolkas also uses Isaac's interactions with the pornography industry in Prague to highlight "the contradictions at the heart of the liberal capitalist order." Isaac's time in Prague highlights "post-communist Europe's fall into the market" and reveals how "the idealism of high culture, which he had once associated with the city (Prague), has succumbed to the world of American fast food, urban alienation, prostitution and pornography." Tsiolkas also suggests that in addition to exploiting the vulnerable, global capitalism has also helped to create an egocentric, antisocial and possibly even predatory form of consumerism that "sees other people as objects, resources or props in the life of the libidinal individual."

== Background ==
The novel was originally conceived a non-fiction project exploring the consequences of global capitalism in post-communist Europe from an Australian traveller's perspective. During his time researching this project, Tsiolkas was surprised at the anti-Semitism he encountered, something he thought had "died in history" and was drawn to examining this phenomenon in his project. Tsiolkas also felt a strong interest in and connection to anti-Semitism due to it being, "the first racism I ever learnt... part of my heritage, the dark side of my own character" which compelled him to explore it in his own writing. Tsiolkas was interested in writing about the relationship between these phenomena but upon realising the level of scholarship, research and academic rigour this would require, he instead moved towards fiction as a means of disseminating and exploring these ideas, and thus the novel Dead Europe was conceived.

== Controversy ==
=== Allegations of Anti-Semitism ===
Dead Europe has been accused of itself representing an example of anti-Semitism by a number of notable critics. They have drawn attention to its problematic depictions of "repellent" Jewish characters who seemed to accord with anti-Semitic stereotypes and tropes. As evidence these critics have highlighted characters such as Syd the pornographer, who "embodies the worst stereotypes about Jewish culture and its relationship with mercantilism", and Gerry the people smuggler, who callously exploits migrant workers in his warehouse to for his own personal gain, as examples rather than interrogations, of anti-Semitism. Additionally, the anti-Semitic opinions espoused by protagonist Isaac have been criticised as being seemingly representative of Tsiolkas's own beliefs, as Robert Manne described it, "are we to assume there is a complete disjunction in character and sensibility between the thirty-something gay Greek-Australian photographer, the novel's narrator Isaac... and the thirty-something gay Greek-Australian novelist, Christos Tsiolkas, who is the author of Dead Europe?"

== Reception ==
Although Dead Europe received a number of literary awards and nominations, the critical response it received was divided. Some, such as Ian Syson of The Age and Michael Williams of the Australian Book Review, praised Tsiolkas' investigation of controversial themes and his literary style, with Syson going so far as to say that the book is "not just good, breathtakingly good". Others, such as Robert Manne and Les Rosenblatt criticised the novel for its violence, gore and problematic depictions of anti-Semitism, deriding Tsiolkas's attempts to "excite himself and his jaded audience by playing, to my mind purposelessly, with the fire of a magical, pre-modern anti-Semitism".

== Awards and Accolades ==
- 2006 winner: The Age Book of the Year Award – Fiction Prize
- 2006 shortlisted: ASAL Awards – ALS Gold Medal
- 2006 shortlisted: New South Wales Premier's Literary Awards – Christina Stead Prize for Fiction
- 2006 inaugural winner: Melbourne Prize – Best Writing Award
- 2005 shortlisted: Queensland Premier's Literary Awards – Best Fiction Book

== Adaptation ==
A film adaptation of the novel, directed by Tony Krawitz and starring Ewen Leslie as Isaac, was released in 2012. It received mixed to positive reviews, with a 60% rating on Rotten Tomatoes.

== Works cited ==
- Tsiolkas, Christos (2005). Dead Europe. Melbourne, Vic.: Vintage. ISBN 978-0-14379-096-9.
- Brooks, Jessica (2015). "Subaltern Cosmopolitanism: The Question of Hospitality in Christos Tsiolkas' Dead Europe". Journal of the Association for the Study of Australian Literature JASAL. 15 (3).
- Manne, Robert (June 2005). "Dead disturbing. A bloodthirsty tale that plays with the fire of anti-semitism". The Monthly.
- McCann, Andrew (1 May 2010). "Christos Tsiolkas and the Pornographic Logic of Commodity Capitalism". Australian Literary Studies. 25 (1): 32.
- Ng, Lynda (2013). "Dead Europe and The Coming of Age in Australian Literature: Globalisation, Cosmopolitanism and Perversity" (PDF). Australian Humanities Review. 54: 120–135.
- Padmore, Catherine (1 October 2008). "Future tense: Dead Europe and viral anti-Semitism". Australian Literary Studies. 23 (4): 434–445.
- Padmore, Catherine & Tsiolkas, Christos (1 October 2008). "Interview with Christos Tsiolkas: 'What Does Fiction Do?': On Dead Europe: Ethics and Aesthetics". Australian Literary Studies. 23 (4): 446–462.
- Rosenblatt, Les (October–November 2005). "A Place Where Wolves Fuck". Arena. No. 79. pp. 46–48.
- Schoettle, Jane (2012). "Dead Europe". TIFF. Toronto International Film Festival. Archived from the original on 5 October 2012.
- Steger, Jason (26 August 2006). "Poet of the political takes Age Book of the Year prize". The Age. Melbourne, Vic.
- Syson, Ian (28 May 2005). "Review: Dead Europe". The Age. Melbourne, Vic.
- Williams, Michael (June–July 2005). "Review: Dead Europe by Christos Tsiolkas". Australian Book Review. No. 272.
