= My Life in Ruins =

2009 film by Donald Petrie

- Theatrical release poster
- Directed by: Donald Petrie
- Written by: Mike Reiss
- Produced by: Michelle Chydzik Sowa; Nathalie Marciano
- Starring: Nia Vardalos; Richard Dreyfuss; María Adánez; Sheila Bernette; María Botto; Rachel Dratch; Alexis Georgoulis; Ralph Nossek; Bernice Stegers; Harland Williams
- Cinematography: José Luis Alcaine
- Edited by: Patrick J. Don Vito
- Music by: David Newman
- Production companies: 26 Films; Kanzaman Productions
- Distributed by: Fox Searchlight Pictures (United States, Canada, France, Australia and New Zealand); Hollywood Entertainment (Greece); Vértice Cine (Spain)
- Release dates: May 3, 2009 (Tribeca); May 7, 2009 (Greece); June 5, 2009 (United States); August 7, 2009 (Spain)
- Running time: 95 minutes
- Countries: United States; Greece; Spain
- Languages: English; Greek
- Budget: $17 million
- Box office: $20.5 million

My Life in Ruins (released as Driving Aphrodite in the United Kingdom) is a 2009 romantic-comedy film directed by Donald Petrie and starring Nia Vardalos, Richard Dreyfuss, Alexis Georgoulis, Rachel Dratch, Harland Williams and Alistair McGowan. Set among the ruins of ancient Greece, the film follows a tour guide whose life takes a personal detour, while her group gets entangled in comic situations among the ruins, with a series of unexpected stops along the way. The film was released on May 7, 2009, in Greece and on June 5, 2009, in the United States.

== Plot ==
Georgia is a Greek-American teacher who has traveled to Greece to teach the Classics at a local college. Laid off due to budget cuts, she is forced to obtain a job as a tour guide. She feels she has hit rock bottom, losing her passion in everything, and is told by her boss, Maria, that she has received negative feedback from the tourists who say she is boring. Georgia finds herself leading a tour of misfits around Greece, believing she is a failure as they seem to care more about souvenirs than learning about history and culture. She envies her co-worker's group of Canadians, who seem to be more interested in history and culture than wanting to go shopping and hang out at the beach. Maria disagrees with Georgia, saying they are more intrigued by Nico, as he is more engaging. Georgia's driver is replaced at the last minute by driver Poupi.

Everything seems to go wrong, and is made worse when she complains to Maria for favoring Nico over her, letting his group have better conditions than hers. After feeling ignored again, Georgia sends her a letter saying she is quitting at the end of her tour. The next day, an elderly seasoned traveler, Irv Gideon, helps Georgia see why she is not connecting with the group: she finds them annoying, is sick of her current job and is miserable in her life. He shows her how to have fun, be more engaging to the group and let go of her problems. Georgia learns more about them, and opens her eyes to the different places where they are from. In doing so, she also teaches them the origins of the Olympic Games, in a way that makes them genuinely interested. Georgia takes them to one of the ruins where Irv acts as an Oracle to help others with various problems.

While they become more immersed in Greek culture, Poupi shows more interest in Georgia. However, her antics distract him while driving, and he narrowly avoids a major accident on the road. That night, Georgia and her group are given better accommodations in a better hotel by Maria. Unfortunately, this is a place Nico and his group are staying at. Attractive female members from Georgia's group distract a hurt Nico as Georgia, Irv and Poupi secretly sabotage his tour bus, stealing the air conditioning and installing it in theirs. The next day, as they enjoy the day at the beach, Irv becomes sick and they take him to the hospital. Georgia is unsure if she should continue, concerned for Irv's health, until Poupi encourages her to do so.

During a tour of the Parthenon, Georgia shows them why she loves coming here: at the right time, you can feel the wind from the ruins. Many hear the wind and are impressed by its peace. One of the group members named Gator asks Georgia if they can visit the hospital to see Irv. The group thinks it's a great idea and she agrees. While his group looks around, the annoyed Nico confronts Georgia. She realizes she had the better group and that he never got to know his own group. Nico reveals that without air conditioning on his tour bus, he got a serious headache from the constant complaints his group was making and wanted a beach day. When he openly insults his group by calling them Americans, the Canadians are offended and start beating him up. Georgia's group visits the hospital, where Irv is recovering well.

At the farewell party, Maria confronts Georgia about the letter and convinces her to stay, with a promise of a raise after reading the great reviews from her group. She even admits that she is glad Nico quit as she never liked him and only tolerated him because she knew his parents well. Georgia ends up with Poupi, who gets promoted to full-time.

== Cast ==
- Nia Vardalos as Georgia Ianakopolis
- Richard Dreyfuss as Irv Gideon
- Alexis Georgoulis as Poupi Kakas
- Alistair McGowan as Nico
- Harland Williams as Big Al Sawchuck
- Rachel Dratch as Kim Sawchuck
- Caroline Goodall as Dr. Elizabeth Tullen
- Ian Ogilvy as Mr. Stewart Tullen
- Sophie Stuckey as Caitlin Tullen
- María Botto as Lala
- María Adánez as Lena
- Brian Palermo as Marc Mallard
- Jareb Dauplaise as Gator
- Simon Gleeson as Ken
- Natalie O'Donnell as Sue
- Sheila Bernette as Dorcas
- Ralph Nossek as Barnaby
- Bernice Stegers as Maria
- Rita Wilson as Elinor
- Ian Gomez as hotel clerk

== Production ==
=== Development ===
The script is originally by Mike Reiss, based on his travel experiences, but it was later re-written by Vardalos (My Big Fat Greek Wedding) after she became involved. The film was co-produced by Gary Goetzman and Tom Hanks, and is directed by Donald Petrie. Vardalos has stated that the film was a lifelong dream of hers for she had always wanted to do a film in her family's ancestral homeland.

=== Filming ===
The film is set on location in Greece and Alicante, Spain, including Guadalest and Javea. This was the first time that an American film studio was allowed to film on location at the Acropolis; the Greek government gave the studio its approval after Vardalos sought permission to film several scenes there. Other Greek filming locations include Olympia, Delphi, and Epidaurus.

== Release ==
The official US trailer by Fox Searchlight Pictures was released on January 7, 2009. The film premiered on June 5, 2009, and took in $3.2 million, placing it ninth of ten for American box office income in its three-day opening weekend. After 17 days of its release, My Life In Ruins took in gross sales of $8,500,270 in the United States. In Greece, the film grossed $1,549,303 1st in its three-day opening weekend, placing it first in sales for the weekend. After a month, sales stood at $1,871,896 placing it 8th in the yearly Greek box office. Canadian ticket sales for My Life In Ruins came in at $777,290.

The film was released simultaneously on DVD and Blu-ray on October 6, 2009, in the United States. As of April 12, 2010 the domestic DVD sales for My Life In Ruins are $5,718,459.

=== Distribution ===
The film is distributed by Fox Searchlight Pictures in the United States, Australia, and New Zealand, and it is distributed in all other locations by Echo Bridge Entertainment.

== Reception ==
According to Fox Searchlight Pictures' President Peter Rice in the company's press release for signing a distribution deal for the film, the film gained positive feedback in early screenings:

"Given the wildly enthusiastic audience response, we are thrilled to be distributing the film. Nia's enormous box office appeal[s] along with her gift of perfect comedic timing make for a winning combination. Producers Michelle Chydzik Sowa, Nathalie Marciano, Gary Goetzman, Tom Hanks, Rita Wilson and Peter Safran have proven that films with broad audience appeal can still be made independently."

Critics reacted more negatively. On Rotten Tomatoes, the film holds an approval rating of 10% based on 126 reviews, and an average rating of 3.7/10. The website's critical consensus reads, "With stereotypical characters and a shopworn plot, My Life in Ruins is a charmless romantic comedy." On Metacritic, the film has a weighted average score of 34 out of 100, based on 25 critics, indicating "generally unfavorable reviews".

Roger Ebert was unequivocal in his review of June 3, 2009 :

Rarely has a film centered on a character so superficial and unconvincing, [and] played with such unrelenting sameness. I didn't hate it so much as feel sorry for it...The central question posed by "My Life in Ruins" is, what happened to the Nia Vardalos who wrote and starred in My Big Fat Greek Wedding? She was lovable, earthy, sassy, plumper, more of a mess, and the movie grossed more than $300 million. Here she's thinner, blonder, better dressed, looks younger and knows it. She's like the winner of a beauty makeover at a Hollywood studio. She has that don't touch my makeup! look...Now she is rich, famous and perhaps taking herself seriously after being worked over for one too many magazine covers...There is, in short, nothing I liked about "My Life in Ruins," except some of the ruins.

Scott Foundas, writing in The Village Voice (June 2, 2009), agreed:

My Life in Ruins Is Nia Vardalos' Strangely Self-Loathing Anti-Comeback: Substitute "career" for "life" in the title of this stillborn travelogue comedy, and you'll have a succinct verdict on My Big Fat Greek Wedding writer/star Nia Vardalos, whose efforts to prove herself more than a one-megahit wonder have been greeted by audiences with an apathy previously reserved for the post–Crocodile Dundee oeuvre of Paul Hogan...the result, written by The Simpsons alum Mike Reiss and directed (in a manner of speaking) by Grumpy Old Men's Donald Petrie, is a strangely self-loathing affair that paints Vardalos's tour group as a uniformly ill-mannered, culturally illiterate bunch, while rendering Greece itself as a badly plumbed third-world hellhole run by lazy, Zorba-dancing louts.

David Stratton of At the Movies, gave the film 1 out of 5 stars and said:

... maybe they [the Greek Government] read the script and they thought, 'This is a shocker'. And it is so bad, this film ... the Australian characters are unbelievable throwbacks to another era ... everybody is awful. And, unfortunately, she's [Vardalos] disconcertingly like Sarah Palin, and this really threw me during the film. But it's just such a crass [film] - and all these jokes about Poupi's name. That's supposed to be funny.

=== Accolades ===
The film was nominated for Choice Summer Movie: Romance at the 2009 Teen Choice Awards.
