= Eisai to Tairi mou =

- Genre: Comedy; Romance
- Created by: Lefteris Papapetrou
- Written by: Lefteris Papapetrou
- Directed by: Antonis Aggelopoulos
- Starring: Alekos Sissovitis; Katerina Lehou; Vasilis Charalabopoulos; Vicky Stavropoulou; Alexis Georgoulis; Ivoni Maltezou; Dimitris Kaberidis; Gerasimos Gennatas; Aris Servetalis; Daphnie Labrogianni
- Theme music composer: Stefanos Korkolis
- Opening theme: "Eisai To Tairi Mou" (instrumental)
- Country of origin: Greece
- Original language: Greek
- No. of seasons: 1
- No. of episodes: 30

Production
- Executive producer: Tasos Papandreou
- Producer: Andreas Tsakonas
- Production locations: Athens; Melbourne
- Camera setup: Multi-camera
- Running time: 45 minutes / episode
- Production company: Studio ATA

Original release
- Network: Mega Channel
- Release: October 1, 2001 – June 25, 2002

Eisai To Tairi Mou (Greek: Είσαι Το Ταίρι Μου; English: You're My Mate) is a Greek romance comedy television series aired in the 2001–2002 season by Mega Channel. It was written by Lefteris Papapetrou and directed by Antonis Aggelopoulos. The title song of the series was composed by Stefanos Korkolis, while Paschalis wrote the lyrics and performed it. The series was scheduled to be completed in 25 episodes, but the high viewing figures increased its duration.

The series won three awards in "Prosopa" Awards, in categories "Best Comedy Series", "Best Comedy Screenplay" for Lefteris Papapetrou and "Best Supporting Actor" for Aris Servetalis. It also won the audience award for "Best Comedy Series".

== Series overview ==
Season	Episodes	Original air date		Viewership (average)
Season	Episodes	Premiere	Finale	Viewership (average)
1	30	1 October 2001	25 June 2002	41.2%

== Plot ==
Stella and Vicky are two women of Greek diaspora who meet in Melbourne. Stella is a short and overweight woman to whom men do not pay attention, while Vicky is tall, thin and beautiful, attracting men. Stella was born and raised in Melbourne with her friend, Toula, who have an atelier. Vicky was born in Greece and came to Australia for business. They both fall in love with Nikos, a scion of a wealthy Greek family of businessmen, who works in Australia. Stella watches him from afar, never having spoken to him, while Vicky meets him in a bar and they become a couple. At the same time, Stella flirts online with Grigoris (Gregory), a young man from Athens.

Nikos and Vicky get engaged. The two women travel to Greece together: Stella on vacation and Vicky to meet Nikos's family; the latter has the idea of the two changing identities. As such, Stella should be presented to Nikos's family as "Vicky" and their future bride and Vicky should be presented as "Stella" to Gregory. Stella does not accept, but Vicky finds a way to do so by changing the labels on the suitcases and leaving her alone at the airport. Leaving the arrivals, he meets Nikos's family who are waiting for Vicky and, not knowing what to do, tells them that it is her.

Stella stays with Vicky's in-laws who host her in their villa. Although, they are surprised that Nikos has found a woman so different from the ones he usually finds, Stella wins the hearts of everyone except Aneta, while she falls in love with Sotiris, Nikos's little brother. While Stella lives as Vicky with Nikos's family, Vicky meets Gregory as Stella, whom he falls in love with. But things get even more complicated when Nikos returns from Australia...

== Cast ==
=== Main ===
- Alekos Sissovitis as Nikos (Nick) Bezentakos
- Katerina Lehou as Vicky Seitanidi
- Vasilis Charalabopoulos as Grigoris (Gregory) Kapernaros
- Vicky Stavropoulou as Stella Papalimneou
- Alexis Georgoulis as Sotiris Bezentakos
- Ivoni Maltezou as Vera Bezentakou-Ipsilanti
- Dimitris Kaberidis as Likourgos Bezentakos
- Gerasimos Gennatas as Panagiotis Zigouras
- Aris Servetalis as Lazaros (Lazarus) Karageorgopoulos
- Daphnie Labrogianni as Anneta Bezentakou

=== Recurring ===
- Vasilis Andreopoulos as Nikos (Nick) Ipsilantis
- Vicky Vanita as Emilia (Emily) Ipsilanti
- Sofia Vogiatzaki as Toula
- Theodora Voutsa as Chrisoula
- Panagiotis Filippeos as Miltiades Zigouras

== Episodes ==
- The series aired every Monday, except the last episode which aired Tuesday.

No. of episode	Original air date	Viewership (average)	Rating
1	1 October 2001 (9:40 pm)	24.5%	9.6
Stella arrives in Greece from Australia and Nikos's family is waiting for her at the airport. The family looks happy, unlike Stella who looks terrified. Telling the camera that "she's innocent" and that "it all started in Australia," time goes back some months and the story begins. She has an atelier in Australia, where she works with her friend, Toula. Every day, they wait to see Nikos arrive at the gym across the street from the atelier. The two of them are short and overweight, unlike Vicky who is tall and thin and comes to the atelier to have her clothes sewn. Meanwhile, Stella talks online with Grigoris, a Greek who works at Goody's and cohabits with a friend of his, Lazaros. The two of them want to meet and talk in person when Stella goes to Greece for a vacation. In Greece, Anneta, Nikos's sister, tries to run the family's dairy factory. She has taken on her shoulders the whole burden of the business since Nikos is in Australia and Sotiris, the little brother, is not interested and prefers to work as a factory worker rather than as a boss. Back in Australia, Nikos goes to the expat dance, where Stella, Toula and Vicky are also found. Stella and Toula see him, while Vicky does not, unlike Nikos who sees her and falls in love with her at first sight.
2	8 October 2001 (9:40 pm)	N/A	
Stella begins a diet and with the help of Toula tries not to succumb, but in vain. Nikos is looking to find Vicky and frequents the bar every night that he learned she frequents until he succeeds in finding her. Meanwhile, Vicky begins to have insecurities about her body and that she will not always be thin, while she also wants to become a mother because she is getting older. Finally, she goes to the bar, and Nikos does not miss the opportunity to approach her. Despite the difficult start, the two start dating, without Vicky knowing that Nikos is the man Stella is watching from afar. In Greece, Grigoris is waiting to receive a new message from Stella, but nothing, while Lazaros and his best friends hang out at home and do not miss the opportunity to scare a researcher who came to the house for an investigation. Likourgos wants Nikos to return from Australia to work in the factory and settle down, but he is just enjoying his single life in Melbourne.
3	15 October 2001 (9:40 pm)	22.8%	8.9
Vicky and Nikos are now a couple and Vicky runs and tells Stella everything. At first she listens to her excited, until the moment she understands which Nikos she is talking to her about. Toula reassures her that this relationship will not last because Nikos is a womanizer. Meanwhile, Stella sends a message to Grigoris that she will arrive in Greece in ten days and he gets nervous because he doesn't know what she looks like and if she will like it when she sees him. He asks Lazaros for help, but he can't offer much. He goes to a gym to lose as many extra pounds as he can before her arrival. Back in Australia, Nikos proposes to Vicky, which she accepts. He announces this to his family and everyone is happy, except Anneta, who is suspicious of the purposes of her future bride and sure that she does not love Nikos but is marrying him for his money. Nikos wants Vicky to go to Greece earlier than him to meet his family, while when Vicky announces to Stella that she is getting married, she is shocked.
4	22 October 2001 (9:40 pm)	26.7%	10.6
Vicky has doubts about whether Nikos meant the marriage proposal he made to her or whether he simply did it because of the circumstances of which they found themselves. She thinks about telling him that she regretted it, but changes her mind seeing his behavior. They hold an engagement reception for friends and acquaintances in Australia, where Stella and Toula also attend. Stella wants to make a scene but Toula restrains her so they won't be humiliated. Vicky does not want to go sooner than Nikos to Greece and stay with his family, but he insists. Vicky travels to Greece with Stella and during the trip, Vicky does not let Stella eat anything and in general her whole behavior makes Stella beg that they arrive as quickly as possible to their destination, to be quiet. Also, while traveling, Vicky comes up with a plan: to swap places with Stella and introduce her as Vicky to Nikos's family, while she will introduce herself as Stella to Grigoris. Stella finds her plan stupid and refuses to do it. But when they arrive in Greece, Vicky changes the names on the suitcases at a time when Stella is not there and leaves, leaving her alone. Stella realizes what happened and tries to escape, but she does not succeed and presents herself as Vicky to Nikos's family.
5	29 October 2001 (9:50 pm)	28.7%	11.6
Stella arrives at Nikos's house from the airport and meets the other family members. Anneta loses it when she sees her, unable to believe that her brother would ever be engaged to someone like her. Nikos's parents treat her very kindly, while in front of the others she pretends to talk to Nikos on the phone and that she is in love. In reality she is panicked and tries to find a way to leave the house, knowing that it will be revealed at some point that she is not the real Vicky. Meanwhile, Vicky calls Grigoris as Stella and asks him to be found. When he arrives at his house and opens the door to her, he loses sight of her. At some point when he is missing from the living room, Lazaros walks out of the room and hits on Vicky. Because of this, Vicky asks Grigoris to go somewhere outside. They go for skewers and on the way back, Grigoris isn't sure if he should go up to the hotel room. He eventually decides to do so but when he asks about Stella's room at the reception, he is told that no Stella is staying there. He insists and eventually runs away when the employee calls hotel security.
6	5 November 2001 (9:50 pm)	N/A	
Grigoris, although he ran away from Vicky's hotel, tries to sneak into it to find her. He goes from door to door but does not succeed, as security discovers him and he returns home disappointed. Stella, when everyone in the house goes to bed, packs her bags to run away. In the garden, however, she falls on Sotiris who stops her and takes her for a ride on the motorbike to see Athens. Returning home, Stella confides to Toula over the phone that she has probably fallen in love with Sotiris. Meanwhile, Anneta and Sotiris still cannot believe that Nikos loves such a woman, while the family does everything they can to make Vicky comfortable: including eating salads and foods based on what Nikos described to them, so as not to tempt her. Stella, in order to stop her hunger, secretly eats at night what she finds in the refrigerator, which is noticed by Sotiris. Vera, believing that Vicky is bored during the summer in Athens, decides that it would be good to go on a weekend to their cottage in Andros accompanied by Sotiris. Although furious when he hears this, Vera eventually convinces him to accompany her. Vicky learns about the trip and asks Grigoris to go to Andros as well.
7	12 November 2001 (9:50 pm)	29.4%	12.6
Stella and Sotiris arrive in Andros, as does Vicky with Grigoris. While Sotiris and Stella are on the beach, Sotiris goes to get ice cream and accidentally crashes into Vicky, soiling her. Even though he apologizes, Vicky keeps yelling and swearing at him. Sotiris recognizes her since she came to his home looking for Stella, but says nothing. Later in the evening, the four meet at a club where Vicky introduces Grigoris to Stella. Vicky and Grigoris leave and Sotiris and Stella are left alone at the club. She wants to dance and when she does, some men make fun of her. Sotiris, in his attempt to defend her, fights with them and they are thrown out of the shop. The next day they leave for Athens. Grigoris and Vicky visit the art museum containing Toulouse Lautrec and later go for a swim. There, Grigoris defends Vicky, when two male strangers harass her. Despite eating wood, Vicky, wanting to thank him for his intentions, kisses him. Meanwhile, back in Athens, Anneta searches Stella's things in the hope of finding something.
8	19 November 2001 (9:50 pm)	29.5%	12.6
Vera asks Stella if they have decided with Nikos about the wedding date so that they can get everything ready on time. Stella says no and tries to change the conversation. Vicky is at Grigoris and Lazaros's House discussing Australia. She also meets Mitsos, Lazaros's inguana, for the first time. With the conversation, the time passes and Grigoris tells her to stay there for the night, giving her his room. Meanwhile, Stella continues to find roses in her room and believes that Sotiris leaves them for her. Nikos calls Sotiris asking him to bring a horse for Vicky, since she loves riding, as a surprise. Stella, as soon as she sees the horse, tries to find excuses not to ride, but in vain. Anneta, wanting to know information about Vicky, searches the phonebook for everyone who has the same surname as her. When she finds someone who knows her, she sends Sotiris to learn information. Sotiris meets a car mechanic and from what he says, Sotiris believes he is talking about another Vicky, while Anneta calls an emergency family council. Vicky and Grigoris go to a venue where a jazz band is playing, and he tells her for the first time that he loves her.
9	26 November 2001 (9:50 pm)	31.5%	12.5
Stella tries to approach Sotiris and visits him in his little house, catching him in conversation with a woman. Meanwhile, Vicky and Grigoris return home after jazz night and consummate their relationship. Back at the Bezentakou's home, Anneta has called a family council to clarify what is happening to "Vicky", since the woman described by Nikos has nothing to do with the one in their house – neither by external appearance, nor by habits. So, with the support of Sotiris, he interrogates her to prove that she does not know Nikos. Eventually though, Stella manages to "pass the test" and later Sotiris visits her in her room to apologize to her for hassling her. The next day, Stella prepares a picnic basket with breakfast and goes towards Sotiris's house. But Sotiris has spent the night with Katerina, who is still there, and so Stella's plans are broken.
10	3 December 2001 (9:50 pm)	29.8%	12.6
Stella finds a way to get rid of Katerina so that she has a free field for Sotiris. Anneta and Sotiris go to a detective agency to find out what "Vicky" is hiding. The detective finds clues about her life, but what she tells them does not match the image of Vicky they have at home. So the detective moves on to the next step, that of surprise. He goes to visit Vicky as someone well known from Australia. Although at first Stella panics, when they meet she understands that something is wrong, since it is obvious that "Kiriakos" has never been to Australia and certainly does not know her. Not her, nor Nikos. Later when he watches her, she notices him and the two make a deal so that he does not betray her. Meanwhile, Grigoris and Vicky go bowling, where another man constantly sticks to Stella and Grigoris gets irritated. Returning home they quarrel, but make up quickly. At some point when Lazaros is home alone, he searches Vicky's things and discovers that her name is not Stella, as she had introduced herself to them. Back at Bezentakou's house, Stella has a conversation with Panagiotis, which is misunderstood by both sides. Concluding the conversation, Stella believes that Sotiris shares her feelings, while Panagiotis believes that Stella shares his. Nikos cannot contact Vicky for a long time and because he is worried, he books a ticket to return to Greece.
11	10 December 2001 (9:50 pm)	30.4%	13.4
Nikos eventually cancels the ticket to Greece when Vicky contacts him. Lazaros, having discovered that the woman they have in their house is not Stella but Vicky, takes advantage of it to show off to his friends. Vicky agrees to do whatever he asks of her as it is the only way to get her passport back. She then breaks up with Grigoris because, as she tells him, she has left open "accounts" back in Australia and will have to close them before they continue. Meanwhile, Miltiades has found the intercom his parents used when he was an infant and decides to listen in on Stella. Listening to a hypothetical conversation Stella is having with Toula on the phone, Miltiades understands that Stella is pregnant and announces it to everyone. In front of her they say nothing and when Stella goes for a drive, Vera sends Sotiris to follow her and watch over her. Sotiris finds her at the bar and tries in a polite way to get her to stop smoking and drinking, bringing Stella to her limits. Reaching his limits, he reveals to her that he knows she is pregnant.
12	17 December 2001 (9:50 pm)	32.4%	15.1
On a walk with Nikos's grandpa on the beach, he tells Stella that he knows everything but forces her to promise him that he won't say anything because the family has adored her, and she has brought joy back into their home. Stella finds a key in Nikos's room and realizes that it is for Sotiris's house. Taking advantage of the absence of Sotiris, she goes inside and searches for his things. She finds some manuscripts and spends the whole evening reading them. Sotiris returns in the morning and finds her there, which he does not like at all, especially when he realizes that she has found his manuscripts. Vicky flies to Australia to surprise Nikos. When Stella learns of this, she realizes that she must disappear from the house. Although she panics at first, she eventually books a hotel room and waits for Vicky to return to Greece. Grigoris, after parting with Vicky, falls into depression. Lazaros trying to help him, searches and finds Stella's phone number in Australia. Grigoris excited, calls and talks with Toula, while Lazaros finds out that Stella does indeed exist. Vicky arrives at Nikos's apartment, but is surprised when Nikos returns with another woman.
13	21 January 2002 (9:50 pm)	44.5%	18.8
Vicky beats up Nikos's mistress, breaks everything in the house, and leaves. Nikos does not know where she has gone and asks Sotiris to call her since he believes that she has left for Greece again. Vicky returns to Greece, while Stella calls home and talks to Sotiris. The two meet and Stella learns what happened to Vicky and Nikos in Australia. As soon as Vicky returns to the hotel, Stella goes to her room and tells her that they must go tell the truth to Nikos's family. Anneta also arrives at the hotel to talk to Vicky and when she goes to the room, the real Vicky hides in the bathroom and pretends to be a cleaning lady, leaving Stella alone with Anneta. Vicky then returns to Grigoris telling him all about what has happened and asks if she can stay there for a while. Stella returns to Nikos's house where they welcome her with joy and try to convince her to forgive Nikos -all except of Anneta- while Sotiris does not appear, indifferent.
14	28 January 2002 (9:50 pm)	42.5%	18.6
Grigoris, after Vicky's return, is happy again, while Lazaros feels neglected. He tries to get the attention of the two but in vain and when Grigoris asks him what he is doing, he pretends to be hurt and makes a jealous scene. Nikos calls Vicky to see what she is doing, but Lazaros answers her phone. Not knowing what is happening, Nikos calls the villa and Chrisoula tells him that the whole family went to bouzoukia. Combining the facts, Nikos deduces that Vicky is in bouzouki with her lover and the whole family. Meanwhile, while they are having fun, Stella goes out on the dance floor to sing a song courting Sotiris, something Vera realizes. Stella advises Miltiadis what to do when he is bullied again at school. When Anneta is informed that her son has insulted and beaten the other children, she becomes furious. Still trying to understand what kind of person this Vicky is, Anneta visits Tsirigoulis, a folk singer who had a bond with the real Vicky. Stella, Vera and Anneta go for a wedding dress, while Nikos flies to Greece.
15	4 February 2002 (9:50 pm)	43.8%	19.3
In the Bezentakou's house, preparations for the wedding continue. Likourgos quarrels with Sotiris because he is indifferent and does not help at all, as a result of which Likourgos begins to have medical troubles with his heart. Stella continues her efforts to get closer to Sotiris. Meanwhile, Anneta begins to have nightmares that "Vicky" has cooked and eaten Nikos, and when she can't reach him by phone, she begins to see it as a bad sign. No one in the family knows that Nikos is flying to Greece so his cell phone is off. Grigoris, Vicky and Lazaros go to Grigoris's village for the weekend and Vicky meets his parents. Everything goes fine until the morning they wake up, he realizes that Vicky left in the night without saying anything.
16	18 February 2002 (9:50 pm)	47.4%	21.2
Stella wakes up and finds everyone in the house upset. When she asks what is going on, they inform her that Nikos has arrived and she is shocked. When he comes back, she looks for a way to leave desperately, but does not succeed. As soon as she sees him, she attempts to talk to him to explain, but he grabs her and kisses her, causing Stella to faint. Grigoris can't understand why Vicky left so suddenly. Lazaros remembers that the night she left, Vicky received a phone call from someone "Alexis", which upset her greatly. Back at the Bezentakou's house, Stella recovers and Nikos continues to treat her well in front of the others. But when the two of them are alone, he tells her that he knows everything because Vicky told him as soon as he arrived in Greece. But she did not tell him that the idea was hers, but that Stella had deceived her, too. In front of the family they continue to behave as if in love, until they arrange it for Stella to leave the house. Lazaros goes and finds Vicky at the hotel and they talk and when he returns home, he tells Grigoris that he has learned that Vicky has left for Australia.
17	25 February 2002 (9:50 pm)	49.0%	21.0
Nikos and Stella continue to pretend to be a couple, but when grandpa doesn't feel well and Vera goes to their room to wake them up, she finds them sleeping apart. The fact is passed on by word of mouth and everyone learns of it. Anneta is glad that something is wrong and tells Sotiris, while they are in the grandfather's room. Grandpa hears it although he is supposed to be asleep. When they leave the room, grandpa gets up and says that "they got wind of them" revealing that he is only pretending to be sick so that Nikos and Stella do not leave for on a supposed vacation. In the evening, Nikos meets Vicky secretly in the garden and Stella, looking to find where Nikos went in the night, sees them. To stop them, she secretly turns on the garden sprinklers and they both become soaked. Lazaros tries to tell Grigoris the truth that Vicky is getting married, but he does not understand and is determined to go to Australia to find her.
18	11 March 2002 (9:00 pm)	45.8%	20.9
Nikos and Stella set up a fight in the night so that they can announce that they are separating. When they make the announcement the next day, his parents try to convince them not to make hasty decisions, but they are told that the decision is final. Anneta is happy with the news of the separation and makes fun of it by swearing at Stella, which annoys Sotiris. Meanwhile Grigoris arrives in Australia and searches for Vicky. He finds Stella's aunts' house but when he goes there, he thinks he made a mistake since the niece that she has a photo of is not the "Stella" that he is looking for. He finds the atelier and meets with Toula, who informs him that Stella is in Greece. Back in Greece, Vicky goes to find Grigoris to tell him the whole truth, but Lazaros tells her that he is in Australia. Later, Vicky tells everything to Nikos, who becomes furious when he learns that Vicky has cheated on him. Stella also goes to meet Grigoris for the first time, but does not find him since he is missing abroad.
19	18 March 2002 (9:00 pm)	N/A	
Stella finds another rose with a note with a place and time for meeting. Believing that it is from Sotiris, she goes to the suggested location but sees Panagiotis from afar. Thinking he is there coincidentally, she leaves before he sees her. Nikos goes to find Grigoris but instead, he meets Lazaros thinking that he is Grigoris. Furious, he threatens Lazaros to "cut out". Meanwhile, Grigoris, upon learning that Stella is in Greece, returns back home disappointed. As soon as he arrives, the real Stella is waiting for him outside his house and tells him that she is Stella and he faints. The next day, Vicky goes and tells him the whole truth and leaves. Back at home, Nikos asks Stella to give him back Vicky's wedding ring, but she can't take it off. Sotiris tries to help her, but in vain and when the two go to come close, Emilia cuts them off. Since she is blind they pretend that he is Nikos. They believe that they succeed, but in reality Emilia is not fooled. Stella is ready to leave but before she does, she catches Panagiotis in the act as he is about to leave her a rose.
20	1 April 2002 (9:00 pm)	46.3%	19.0
Stella realizes that Panagiotis was the one who had been leaving her the roses for so long. The two of them have one last talk before he leaves and because of this, Panagiotis decides to make a big change in his life. She also has one last talk with Emilia, who tells her that she should tell Sotiris how she feels. Stella says goodbye to the whole family and leaves. At the last moment, she returns to tell Sotiris that she is in love with him. He wants to tell her something and implores her to wait, but Stella won't stop to listen. Meanwhile, Nikos bugs Lazaros's room, still believing that he is Grigoris. Vicky arrives to ask how Grigoris is and when they go to Lazaros's room to see Mitsos the lizard, Nikos overhears a conversation which he misunderstands as a sexual encounter. Later, he returns to beat up Lazaros and kidnap Mitsos. Stella plans to go back to Australia but before she does, she wants to tell the truth to Nikos's family. She goes and finds Vicky with the intention of forcing her to go with her to the Bezentakou family home.
21	15 April 2002 (9:00 pm)	50.9%	20.7
Lazaros is looking everywhere for Mitsos and has fallen into depression. Not knowing what to do to help him, Grigoris, Mimis and Fanis bring another iguana and present it to him as Mitsos. Stella forces Vicky to go with her to Nikos's house, so that they can tell the truth. When they get there, however, he learns that Likourgos is not well and so they say nothing. She greets them all, while Likourgos is very glad to see her. Before they leave, Nikos wants to talk to Vicky and so Stella finds the opportunity to go to look for Sotiris. But he sees that Katerina is at his house, she leaves. Grigoris is still trying to get over his breakup with Vicky and what she told him, while Stella follows him to a bar. The two of them drink together and have a conversation for the first time in person. Nikos, after learning that Vicky has broken up with Grigoris, returns Mitsos, leaving him outside Grigoris's door.
22	22 April 2002 (9:00 pm)	52.4%	20.4
It has been two months since Stella returned to Australia and she remembers the moments from Greece with nostalgia. Wanting to communicate with Nikos's family, she decides to write a letter to Sotiris. The night he reads it, Sotiris has a nightmare that he is married to Stella and says her name in his sleep. Katerina hears him and leaves upset the next morning. Likourgos is not well and after they return from the hospital, he asks Nikos for a favor: for "Vicky" to come and see him and to try to mend their relationship. Panagiotis decides to divorce Anneta and collects his things. In the living room, he meets Nikos who tells him that Likourgos is not well and it is not time for partings. So, Panagiotis returns to his room but Anneta does not accept him back, and also fires him from his job in the family business. Grigoris tries to find a new girlfriend but struggles with trust issues. Vicky stays at the hotel and tells the receptionist about her life and looks for a job. Nikos arrives in Australia and tells Stella what his father asked of him.
23	29 April 2002 (9:00 pm)	44.6%	16.6
Stella accepts Nikos's proposal to go back to Greece with him for his father's sake. Vicky tries to contact Nikos and learns that he has gone to Australia to see Stella. Wanting to break out, she goes shopping where she meets Lazaros and mentions to him that she found work as a nude painting model. Lazaros, not wanting to miss the opportunity, goes with Mimis and Fanis as new students to the studio where Vicky works in order to stalk her. Anneta, despite Vera's exhortations to accept Panagiotis back, remains adamant with the result that Sotiris hosts him in his little house. Meanwhile, Anneta meets with Vlasis, who has a dairy factory, about a possible collaboration. The two go out for business dinners and Vlasis flirts with her, and she responds. Vicky stops her car just beyond Nikos's House and purposefully breaks it down. When Sotiris passes by, he offers to take her home to wash and use the phone.
24	13 May 2002 (9:00 pm)	49.7%	18.4
Nikos and Stella return to Athens together, making the family very happy, especially Likourgos. Vicky, trying to find out the details of what Nikos is doing with Stella, approaches Sotiris pretending that her car broke down. The two of them go out together and when they go for a walk to Monastiraki, they meet Grigoris. Panayiotis continues to stay with Sotiris. When Katerina comes to check on Sotiris because of his strange behavior and because she believes that he is cheating on her, she sees them from the window sleeping in the same bed and misunderstands the situation. Leaving, she falls on Stella as she is heading to Sotiris's house. Meanwhile, Anneta continues to date Vlasis on the occasion of the possible merger of their factories, but they end up in the office where they sleep together. Grigoris continues to try to find a girlfriend and goes on a date. Before leaving the house, Lazaros advises him by giving him successful lines -according to him- will help Grigoris manage to charm the girl. When Grigoris tries the lines, the girl runs away.
25	20 May 2002 (9:00 pm)	52.6%	18.2
Anneta, after the evening she spent with Vlasis, returns home at dawn where she meets Nikos and Stella in the kitchen. She lies that she was working late and goes to the room where grandpa is waiting for her, who has figured out what she is doing and tells her to clean up. Due to the situation, she lets Panagiotis return to the room and later tries to tell Vlasis to stop pursuing her, but in vain. Stella goes and finds Sotiris and asks him what he wanted to say to her the day he was leaving. With her behavior she manages to piss him off but they end up kissing. At home, Vera tries to find her, suspecting that something is wrong, and her grandfather says that she is "at the little one's". Stella spends the night with Sotiris and the morning she returns home, Chrisoula covers for her by saying that she slept in her bedroom. Grigoris is furious with Lazaros and the advice he gave him about his last date. He informs him that in the evening he will come home with a new girl and makes it clear that does not want Lazaros at home.
26	27 May 2002 (9:00 pm)	52.0%	18.7
Vicky meets Sotiris at the bar and tries to fish for information about Stella and Nikos. When she learns which restaurant they are in, she goes there and sits at the table of a stranger, Takis, but close-by to Stella and Nikos' table. She makes sure that they are aware of her presence there and behaves as if she is a couple with Takis, which irritates Nikos. Grigoris has spent a beautiful evening with Aphrodite, but in the morning it is spoiled by Mitsos. As a result, Grigoris becomes furious with Lazaros and drives him out of the house. Having nowhere to go, Lazaros goes and finds Vicky at the hotel and stays with her. Nikos constantly leaves messages for Vicky but she does not communicate with him. Meanwhile, Likourgos is convinced that Nikos and "Vicky" have made up and is happy. Anneta continues to be with Vlasis, while he goes outside the house and meets Panagiotis. Sotiris acts casually towards Stella, as if nothing has happened between them, making Stella want to return to Australia.
27	3 June 2002 (9:00 pm)	48.7%	16.4
Grigoris was left alone and nostalgic for the moments he spent with Lazaros, while remembering how they met. Meanwhile, Lazaros has returned and is hiding in the closet with Mitsos. Anneta decides and tells Vlasis that they need to separate. At the Bezentakou's house, the doctor performs the last tests on Likourgos, telling him that he is very well. Likourgos, however, tells the doctor to lie so that he can lead Nikos and "Vicky" to the church. Nikos, after the doctor tells him that his father is not well, asks Stella to get married for his father's sake. Stella goes to find Sotiris to have a conversation with him. When she sees that Sotiris continues to behave indifferently, she goes to Nikos and accepts his proposal. The two announce this to the family, making Likourgos happy. Vicky learns of the marriage and is shocked. Not knowing how things got there, she tells Lazaros that she will not let this marriage take place. When he hears this, he goes and finds Stella and carries the message to her.
28	17 June 2002 (9:00 pm)	51.3%	13.2
Toula arrives from Australia for the wedding and meets the whole family, except for Sotiris, who does not come home to welcome her. Stella tells her that she and Sotiris have slept together and Toula is shocked. She later meets him in the kitchen, while she also visits him in his little house, catching him mid-conversation. While preparations for the wedding are progressing, Nikos meets with Vicky and explains to her why the wedding is taking place. Looking back, they end up fighting and confessing that when they were together, neither of them was truly themselves. Anneta, although she has called things off with Vlasis, is anxiously waiting for his call, while along with the grandfather, Stella has also realized that she is seeing someone. Grigoris discovers that Lazaros is again staying at home hidden in the closet and the two reconcile. Meanwhile, he begins to see and hear Vicky at home, without her being there.
29	24 June 2002 (9:00 pm)	50.7%	12.1
Grigoris keeps seeing Vicky in front of him without her being there until one day at work he freaks out about the whole situation and quits dramatically. Anneta's cell phone rings and Panagiotis sees that it is from an unknown number outside Athens. When Anneta lies to him that it was Nikos, he begins to suspect that something is wrong. The next day, he hides and overhears her talking on the phone and realizes that she is cheating on him. Stella goes to explain to Sotiris why he is having this wedding, but is surprised when he announces that he will not be attending the wedding since he will be on an excursion with his friends. They will go down to Vouraikos with their motorbikes. Vera finds it normal when they tell her, as well as when Nikos asks them later that no one attend the wedding but him, Stella and the maid of Honor. Sotiris starts travelling with Fotis on the motorbikes, but at the turn leaving the house Toula is waiting for him, and tells him that they need to talk.
30	25 June 2002 (9:00 pm)	56.5%	16.3
Grigoris has decided to make a fresh start and packs his things to leave the House. Lazaros takes it to heart and the two of them, until he leaves, do not speak. But when it's time to leave, he gives him a gift and the two say goodbye. Stella and Toula go to Sotiris's house looking for his manuscripts, but he can't find them anywhere. The wedding party arrives and the doctor tells Likourgos that he doesn't feel well about lying. He decides to talk to Stella secretly. He finds her in her room and tells her the truth. Before going downstairs, Stella visits Emilia. They talk about Sotiris and Emilia tells her that Sotiris entrusted his manuscripts to her. She reveals where she hid them and, pretending to listen to music, waits for Stella to pick them up and leave the room. Stella goes into her room and reads them, while Nikos comes and tells her that they must come downstairs. Vicky arrives at the party, but as soon as Nikos and Stella appear, she leaves. Stella sees her and catches up with her in the yard. The two of them talk, and although Stella tells her that the wedding is for Nikos's father, Vicky tells her that she does not know what to believe and whether this was her motive all along: to marry Nikos. Vlasis also comes to the party, and asks Anneta to leave with him. Meanwhile, Panagiotis finds a gun and wants to put an end to his own life. Instead, he hides in the room, and when Vlasis and Anneta come, he threatens them. Vlasis is terrified and runs away, while Panagiotis makes it clear to Anneta that from now on he will have the upper hand in their marriage. The feast ends and everyone falls asleep, while Stella leaves a letter for Toula and leaves. Along the way, she says goodbye to Chrisoula, telling her that her real name is Stella, and while leaving she sees grandpa and Vera looking at her. The narrative skips forward to five months after the previous events: Grigoris has opened a canteen and sells sandwiches. Nikos happens to be passing by and the two of them meet for the first time. They talk about "the woman of their life" who they lost to a "Nikos" and a "Grigoris" respectively, without knowing that their stories are intertwined. Vicky works at the Equestrian Club where a changed Lazaros comes and finds her in a carriage. He asks her to leave together and, though hesitant at first, she climbs into the carriage. Back at Grigoris's canteen, Toula arrives with Mimis, who she met at the wedding party and they have since become a couple. He asks how the married life is going for Stella and Toula reveals to him that the marriage never took place. Back at the night of the party, Stella finds a letter from Sotiris in his manuscripts, telling her to meet him outside the house. The two of them meet and he asks her to leave with him. Before they do, Stella tries to tell him the truth and Sotiris interrupts her by telling her that he knows everything. Riding the motorbike, they leave and in the process fight since Stella wants him to tell her that he loves her, but he refuses to do so. Instead, he has it written on an electronic street sign, which Stella sees and smiles at...

== Soundtrack ==
The music of the titles was composed by Stefanos Korkolis. From the seventeenth episode onwards, in the end titles, the musical composition was enriched with lyrics, which Paschalis wrote and performed. In March 2002, the soundtrack of the series along with the song "Soul Of My Heart" and other variations of it, was released on single. His music and lyrics belong again to Korkolis, while the interpretation was done again by Paschalis.

No.	Title	Performer	Length
1	"You're My Mate"	Paschalis	2:10
2	"Soul Of My Heart"	Paschalis	4:12
3	"You're My Mate" (instrumental)		2:10
4	"Soul Of My Heart" (version teatrale)	Katerina Lehou & Vasilis Charalabopoulos	5:10
5	"Soul Of My Heart" (instrumental)		4:12
