= Dead Europe =

2012 film

- Film poster
- Directed by: Tony Krawitz
- Screenplay by: Louise Fox
- Based on: Novel: Christos Tsiolkas
- Produced by: Lilette Botasi
- Starring: Ewen Leslie; Kodi Smit-McPhee; Igal Naor
- Cinematography: Germain McMicking
- Edited by: Alexandre de Franceschi; Scott Gray
- Music by: Jed Kurzel
- Production company: See-Saw Films
- Distributed by: Transmission Films
- Release date: 14 June 2012 (Sydney)
- Running time: 84 minutes
- Country: Australia
- Languages: English; Greek

Dead Europe is a 2012 Australian drama film directed by Tony Krawitz. It is an adaptation of the 2005 novel by Christos Tsiolkas of the same name. The film has received mixed to positive reviews.

== Cast ==
- Ewen Leslie as Isaac
- Marton Csokas as Nico
- Kodi Smit-McPhee as Josef
- Jean-François Balmer as Gerry
- Yigal Naor as Syd
- William Zappa as Vassily
- Françoise Lebrun as Leah
- Thanos Samaras as Andreas
- Danae Skiadi as Giulia
- Coral Amiga as Yvette
- Ania Bukstein as Amina
- Giannis Antetokounmpo as Neighbour's Son
- Christian Manon as Voice

== Reception ==
Dead Europe received mixed to positive reviews, earning a 63% approval rating on Rotten Tomatoes.

Julie Rigg of ABC Online gave a positive review and called it "one of the most disturbing, and intelligent, Australian films for a long time." Tim Robey of The Daily Telegraph also gave a positive review, calling the movie a "promising drama of alienation that slides into portentousness."

Joel Walsh of Little White Lies however gave a negative review, calling it "macabre, spiteful and all too bleak in its juxtaposition of generations and their transference of guilt."

Peter Galvin from SBS gave the film three stars out of five, noting that the film is "dark, and emotionally claustrophobic" and is "tough to sit through". He also observed that Dead Europe "is a puzzle film, a movie where one is asked to work hard at deciphering its strangeness."
