= Eglimata =

- Εγκλήματα
- Created by: Lefteris Papapetrou
- Directed by: Antonis Tebos; Antonis Aggelopoulos
- Starring: Maria Kavogianni; Kostas Koklas; Kaiti Konstantinou; Christos Chatzipanagiotis; Iro Mane; Stavros Nikolaidis; Soula Athanasiadou; Athinodoros Prousalis; Vasilis Charalabopoulos
- Opening theme: "Little Child" – The Beatles
- Country of origin: Greece
- Original language: Greek
- No. of seasons: 2
- No. of episodes: 66

Production
- Executive producers: Nikos Vergetis; Aglaia Latsiou
- Camera setup: Multi-camera
- Running time: 35–45 minutes / episode
- Production company: ENA Productions

Original release
- Network: ANT1
- Release: October 6, 1998 – June 27, 2000

Eglimata (Greek: Εγκλήματα; English: Crimes) is the title of a Greek black comedy television series aired in the 1998–2000 seasons by ANT1. It was created by Lefteris Papapetrou and directed by Antonis Tebos -at first- and Antonis Aggelopoulos. The producer of the series was initially Nikos Vergetis, who left in the first half of the season (13th episode) and then ENA Productions -a subsidiary of the station- took over the production. The series was based on a lot of funny characters which surrounded a couple with an extramarital relationship. Eglimata became very successful due to its avant garde and achieved high viewing.

== Series overview ==
Season	Episodes	Original air date		Viewership (average)
Season	Episodes	Premiere	Finale	Viewership (average)
1	32	October 6, 1998	June 22, 1999	36.8%
2	34	October 5, 1999	June 27, 2000	32.0%

== Plot ==
The series deals mainly with two married couples. Flora is a woman around 35, married to Achilleas who can not have children, and live with his "prostrate" father and Mrs Machi who takes care of him. Trapped in her miserable life, she decides to live the great love again when she communicates with Alekos who was her childhood love since her teenage years, and they begin to meet secretly.

Alekos is married to Soso who upon learning of his extramarital affair, decides to take revenge on him. The secret meetings of the illegal couple are also known by Michalakis, the bisexual assistant of Alekos in the butcher, to whom he hides. But as Soso sees his bond with Flora seducing him, she begins to plan -many times unsuccessfully- his murder. At the same time, Achilleas finds his lost sister, Corina, a prostitute with a big career and a heart of gold who goes through a lot to be accepted by her relatives.

When Michalakis finds the opportunity to show his love to Soso, she turns him to her side, using him in the plans she is preparing with Pepi, her neighbor and friend. Gradually, everyone becomes aware of the illicit relationship between Alekos and Flora, except -seemingly- from Achilleas. After unexpected deaths, evil plans, and the relationships of all of them having been thwarted, Soso achieves what she desires...

== Development ==
The idea for the series came from Kavogianni, Koklas, Konstantinou, Chatzipanagiotis and Mane who in the 1997–1998 season participated in the theatrical performance "Wait In Your Ear". They approached Lefteris Papapetrou and asked him to create a series for television that would include them all.

Indeed, Papapetrou prepared a relevant script for a series and the first producer of the series Nikos Vergetis immediately believed in this idea, filming its first episodes, without even having reached an agreement for its screening with a television channel. And while the first scripts were ready, filming began in the spring of 1998 preparing the pilot of the series (the first 4 episodes). For weeks, the leaders of the channels -mainly Mega and ANT1- categorically rejected the series because they considered it too advanced for Greek morals and Greek society could not embrace what the series would promote and would reject them. The actors went through forty waves until he finally joined the program of ANT1 with the support of the then program directors of the station, Alkistis Maragkoudaki and Giannis Latsios. And while filming began again in the fall of 1998, with obvious changes in the sets, the "low flights" of the first episodes in the season's television audience ratings brought the second shooting interruption in mid-October, with the series staying afloat after it was ready to be permanently cut. And while in the first month the episodes hovered around 5–15%, they suddenly shot up to almost 30 to 40%, winning a place in the top TV programs every week until its completion.

In the middle of the first cycle, the director, Antonis Tebos left who was simultaneously filming two more daily series of Mega and the Kai Oi Pantremenoi Ehoun Psihi of ANT1, leaving Kostas Kimoulis and Marina Leontari at the helm for 3–4 episodes. From the 17th episode until the end, the director was Antonis Angelopoulos, who had just left the teleconference of the Dio Xenoi, making Egklimata his first directorial work.

== Cast ==
=== Main ===
- Maria Kavogianni as Korina Mitropoulou
- Kostas Koklas as Alekos Papadimas
- Kaiti Konstantinou as Soso Papadima
- Christos Chatzipanagiotis as Achilleas Mitropoulos
- Iro Mane as Flora Mousoutsani-Mitropoulou
- Stavros Nikolaidis as Michalakis Roupakas
- Soula Athanasiadou as Machi Karathanou
- Athinodoros Prousalis as Aristidis Mitropoulos
- Vasilis Charalabopoulos as Johny

=== Recurring ===
- Fotini Baxevani as Pepi
- Vasilis Eftaxopoulos as Pavlos Logaras
- Kostas Baras as Valantis
- Stavros Mavridis as Fotis Koutsoubas
- Nelli Gkini as Revecca
- Elpida Pramas as Joanne
- Nikos Poursanidis as Telis Papadimas
- Socrates Patsikas as Dakis (Aristidis jr.) Mitropoulos

== Episodes ==
=== Season 1 (1998–1999) ===
No. overall	No. in season	Title	Directed by	Written by	Original release date	Viewership	Rating
1	1	TBA	Unknown	Unknown	October 6, 1998	N/A	TBA
2	2	TBA	Unknown	Unknown	October 13, 1998	N/A	TBA
3	3	TBA	Unknown	Unknown	October 20, 1998	N/A	TBA
4	4	TBA	Unknown	Unknown	October 27, 1998	N/A	TBA
5	5	TBA	Unknown	Unknown	November 3, 1998	N/A	TBA
6	6	TBA	Unknown	Unknown	November 10, 1998	33.2%	11.7
7	7	TBA	Unknown	Unknown	November 17, 1998	N/A	TBA
8	8	TBA	Unknown	Unknown	November 24, 1998	35.1%	13.2
9	9	TBA	Unknown	Unknown	December 1, 1998	36.1%	15.0
10	10	TBA	Unknown	Unknown	December 8, 1998	38.0%	16.0
11	11	TBA	Unknown	Unknown	December 15, 1998	37.9%	15.1
12	12	TBA	Unknown	Unknown	December 22, 1998	35.1%	13.0
13	13	TBA	Unknown	Unknown	January 26, 1999	39.3%	16.3
14	14	TBA	Unknown	Unknown	February 2, 1999	39.8%	17.2
15	15	TBA	Unknown	Unknown	February 9, 1999	39.2%	15.7
16	16	TBA	Unknown	Unknown	February 16, 1999	34.4%	15.6
17	17	TBA	Unknown	Unknown	February 23, 1999	36.3%	15.9
18	18	TBA	Unknown	Unknown	March 2, 1999	31.9%	13.8
19	19	TBA	Unknown	Unknown	March 9, 1999	34.9%	13.9
20	20	TBA	Unknown	Unknown	March 16, 1999	40.4%	16.3
21	21	TBA	Unknown	Unknown	March 23, 1999	31.9%	13.3
22	22	TBA	Unknown	Unknown	March 30, 1999	35.3%	13.7
23	23	TBA	Unknown	Unknown	April 6, 1999	31.1%	10.5
24	24	TBA	Unknown	Unknown	April 20, 1999	36.8%	15.2
25	25	TBA	Unknown	Unknown	April 27, 1999	40.2%	14.0
26	26	TBA	Unknown	Unknown	May 4, 1999	39.2%	13.6
27	27	TBA	Unknown	Unknown	May 11, 1999	39.7%	13.1
28	28	TBA	Unknown	Unknown	May 18, 1999	40.7%	13.8
29	29	TBA	Unknown	Unknown	May 25, 1999	39.1%	13.3
30	30	TBA	Unknown	Unknown	June 1, 1999	36.3%	10.9
31	31	TBA	Unknown	Unknown	June 8, 1999	38.5%	11.3
32	32	TBA	Unknown	Unknown	June 22, 1999	34.5%	10.5

=== Season 2 (1999–2000) ===
No. overall	No. in season	Title	Directed by	Written by	Original release date	Viewership	Rating
33	1	TBA	Unknown	Unknown	October 5, 1999	36.0%	12.4
34	2	TBA	Unknown	Unknown	October 12, 1999	35.8%	13.4
35	3	TBA	Unknown	Unknown	October 19, 1999	33.4%	12.5
36	4	TBA	Unknown	Unknown	October 26, 1999	N/A	TBA
37	5	TBA	Unknown	Unknown	November 2, 1999	35.8%	13.9
38	6	TBA	Unknown	Unknown	November 9, 1999	29.5%	11.3
39	7	TBA	Unknown	Unknown	November 16, 1999	32.4%	11.8
40	8	TBA	Unknown	Unknown	November 23, 1999	31.7%	12.8
41	9	TBA	Unknown	Unknown	November 30, 1999	33.5%	12.2
42	10	TBA	Unknown	Unknown	December 7, 1999	31.7%	12.3
43	11	TBA	Unknown	Unknown	December 14, 1999	N/A	TBA
44	12	TBA	Unknown	Unknown	December 21, 1999	34.5%	13.5
45	13	TBA	Unknown	Unknown	January 18, 2000	34.5%	13.2
46	14	TBA	Unknown	Unknown	January 25, 2000	36.4%	14.8
47	15	TBA	Unknown	Unknown	February 1, 2000	40.8%	15.0
48	16	TBA	Unknown	Unknown	February 8, 2000	36.4%	13.5
49	17	TBA	Unknown	Unknown	February 15, 2000	36.2%	15.1
50	18	TBA	Unknown	Unknown	February 22, 2000	33.2%	13.3
51	19	TBA	Unknown	Unknown	February 29, 2000	38.4%	15.9
52	20	TBA	Unknown	Unknown	March 14, 2000	34.2%	14.1
53	21	TBA	Unknown	Unknown	March 21, 2000	N/A	TBA
54	22	TBA	Unknown	Unknown	March 28, 2000	32.2%	11.7
55	23	TBA	Unknown	Unknown	April 4, 2000	33.5%	13.1
56	24	TBA	Unknown	Unknown	April 11, 2000	28.5%	11.5
57	25	TBA	Unknown	Unknown	April 18, 2000	28.2%	11.2
58	26	TBA	Unknown	Unknown	May 2, 2000	39.5%	13.0
59	27	TBA	Unknown	Unknown	May 9, 2000	30.8%	9.9
60	28	TBA	Unknown	Unknown	May 16, 2000	32.9%	10.1
61	29	TBA	Unknown	Unknown	May 23, 2000	34.0%	10.9
62	30	TBA	Unknown	Unknown	May 30, 2000	35.6%	9.4
63	31	TBA	Unknown	Unknown	June 6, 2000	32.3%	8.0
64	32	TBA	Unknown	Unknown	June 13, 2000	34.8%	8.3
65	33	TBA	Unknown	Unknown	June 20, 2000	30.9%	8.1
66	34	TBA	Unknown	Unknown	June 27, 2000	38.0%	8.5

== Trivia ==
- Maria Kavogianni said that during external filming for the first episodes of the series, many drivers thought she was a real prostitute. One of the difficult filming of the series was the last scene in the finale of the first season where the protagonists drown off the coast of Syros, a scene that made it very difficult for Kavogianni since she could not sink, with the result that the divers pushed her down with weights.
- Fotini Baxevani initially did not want to participate in a television series because the actors of the theater of that time "snubbed" television. After pressure from her friend and collaborator, Chatzipanagiotis, she was convinced and after filming her first scene she accepted to continue to participate with the role of Pepi.
- Vasilis Charalabopoulos, before participating in the series, watched it fanatically with his family and had expressed his coveted desire to participate in it. He was originally planned to make an extraordinary appearance in the last 4 episodes of the first season, however he became a key cast member from the second season.
- In the twelfth (Christmas) episode of the second season, Konstantinou was going to wear a real snake around her neck. But her co-star in this scene, Baxevani, was scared and eventually the real one was replaced by a snake tattoo on her neck, as revealed by the costume designer of the series.
- At the last shoot no one could hold back his tears. The shooting of the last scene with Socrates Patsikas, found the actor looking for someone to prepare him as everyone was together and crying.
- In the second half of the second season of the series, it is rumored that Chatzipanagiotis and Mane had bad relations due to an intense quarrel that arose in the first year of the theatrical show "Hair Dryer For Murderers" where they also starred there together. However, Chatzipanagiotis in a recent interview on an ERT broadcast stated that this event happened in November 2000 after the completion of the series, where the relations of the actors were completely cooled.
