= Alexis Georgoulis =

Greek actor and politician

- Αλέξης Γεωργούλης
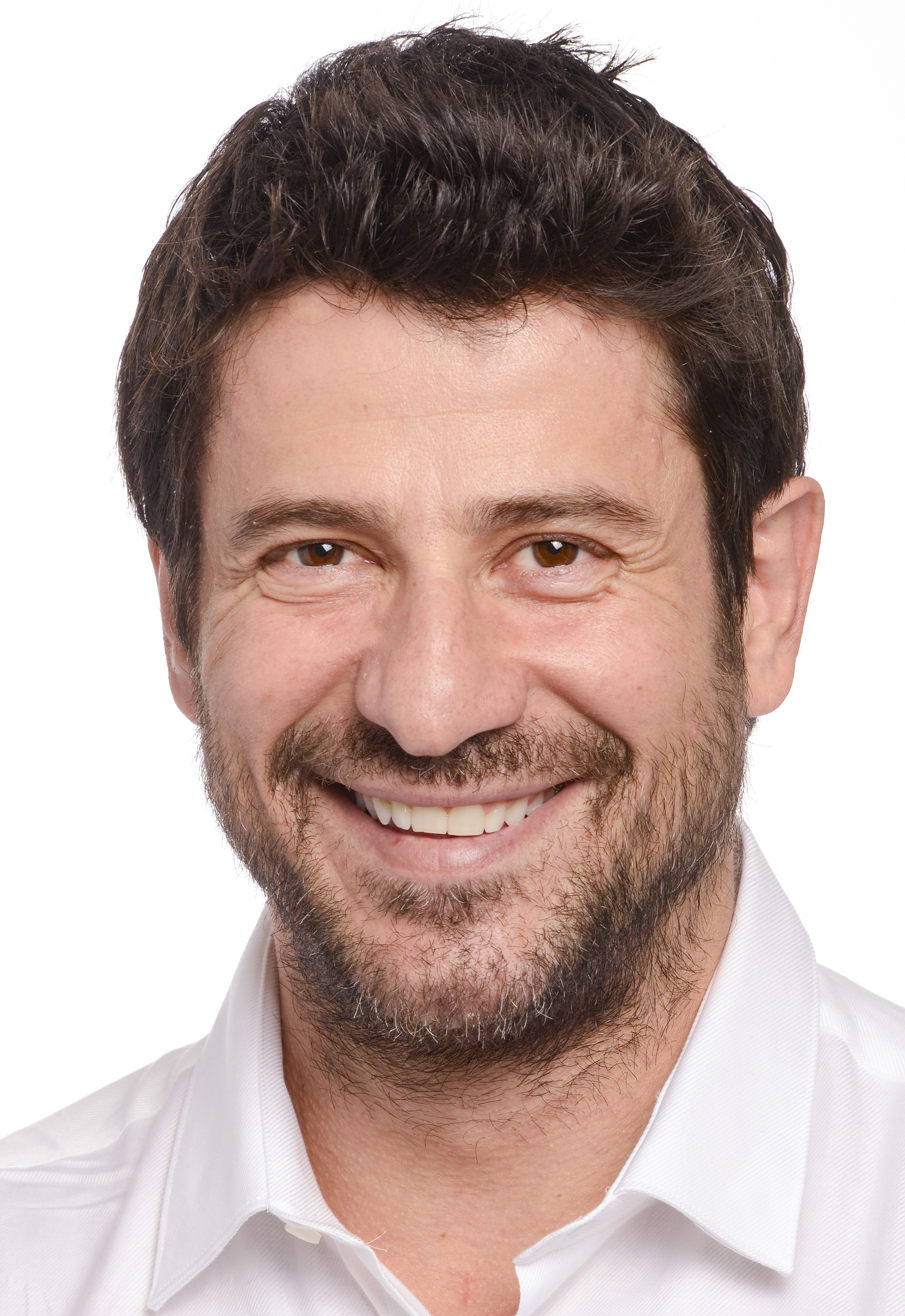
- Born: 6 October 1974 (age 51); Larissa, Greece
- Occupations: Actor; politician
- Political party: Syriza (2019-2023)

Member of the European Parliament for Greece
- In office 2 July 2019 – 16 July 2024

Alexis Georgoulis (Greek: Αλέξης Γεωργούλης; born 1974) is a Greek actor and politician.

== Early life ==
Georgoulis was born on 6 October 1974 in Larissa, Greece. His father worked for OPAP and his mother taught kindergarten. Georgoulis served his mandatory military service in the Hellenic Army, and began studying civil engineering at the National Technical University of Athens in 1993. In 1996, he began acting with local drama schools, and in 1997, he was accepted to the Vasilis Diamantopoulos' Jasmine drama school.

== Acting ==
After performing with the dance troupe Heresis in their renditions of Carmen 33 and The Return, Georgoulis began working in television. He first took smaller roles in Alice in Wonderland and Death Agony, but it was his co-starring role in 2001's Eisai to Tairi mou that elevated the Greek actor to stardom. According to the WGBH Educational Foundation, in recognition of his fame, Georgoulis is called the "George Clooney of Greece" therein.

== Performance credits ==
=== Dance ===
Year	Title	Citation(s)
1997	Carmen 33	
1998	The Return	

== Filmography ==
=== Film ===
Year	Title	Role	Notes	Ref.
1999	Original Sin	Eleni's boyfriend	Film debut	
1999	No one's rose		Short movie	
2002	The Bubble	Makis Mparlavatzas		
2002	Tomorrow will be late	Antonis Mainas		
2002	I'm tired of killing my lovers	Vasilis Iordanidis		
2003	Oxygen: Blackmail boy	Stelios Nousias		
2005	Lioumbi	Dimitris Georgiou		
2009	My Life in Ruins	Poupi Kakas		
2012	A Green Story	George		
2015	One summer in Greece	Yannis Papadopoulos		
2015	Puppets	Phillipos Koraes		
2016	The Durrells	Spiros Chalkiopoulos		
2017	Everything is wonderful	Maria's lover		
2023	My Big Fat Greek Wedding 3	Peter Portokalos		

=== Television ===
Year	Title	Role(s)	Notes
1997	Goodmorning Life	Panos Drakoulas	3 episodes
1997	The good guys are back		Episode: "Alice in Wonderland"
1997-1998	We are on air	Michalis Karaiskakis	20 episodes
1998	Angel in love: Death Agony		TV mini series
2001-2002	You're my Soulmate	Sotiris Bezentakos	Lead role / 30 episodes
2003-2004	It was a dream	Michalis Koroneos	Lead role / 20 episodes
2004-2005	Lover of Western Suburbs	Spyros Fountas	Lead role / 33 episodes
2005-2006	Quicksand	George / Himself	Lead role / 24 episodes; also writer
2006	The stories of policeman Beccas	Dimitris Papazoglou	Episode: "Strictly Personal"
2006	Honorable Cuckolds	Thanasis	Episode: "The Crook Cuckold"
2007	The stories of policeman Beccas	Gerasimos Petridis	Episode: "The Angel"
2007	If you love me	doctor	5 episodes
2007-2008	One month or something	Andreas Maragkos	Lead role / 25 episodes
2011	No if you receive more than the one who doesn't have	Georgios Karaiskakis / Kolochalikis (voice roles)	2 episodes
2014	Happiness 22: The Mini Market	Charis	Lead role / 8 episodes
2015-2016	Barman	Himself (host)	Late night talk show on Alpha TV
2016-2019	The Durrells	Spiros Halikiopoulos	Lead role / 26 episodes
2019-2020	Your Face Sounds Familiar	Himself (judge)	Season 5-6
2020	Joker	Himself (host)	Daytime game show on OPEN

== Politics ==
As a member of Syriza, he was elected to the European Parliament on 26 May 2019 for a four-year term. His platform included the promotion of the cinema of Greece. When his involvement in an alleged case of sexual harassment went public in 2023, he was expelled from both Syriza and The Left in the European Parliament – GUE/NGL.
