= I tourta tis mamas =

- Genre: Comedy
- Created by: Alexandros Rigas; Dimitris Apostolou
- Directed by: Alexandros Rigas
- Starring: Kostas Koklas; Kaiti Konstantinou; Paris Thomopoulos; Thanos Lekkas; Michalis Papadimitriou; Lydia Fotopoulou; Ioanna Pylichou; Alexandros Rigas
- Theme music composer: Giannis Patrikareas
- Country of origin: Greece
- Original language: Greek
- No. of seasons: 2
- No. of episodes: 62

Production
- Executive producer: Stelios Aggelopoulos MI.KE.
- Producer: Evaggelos Maurogiannis
- Production locations: Ekali, Attica, Greece
- Camera setup: Multi-camera
- Running time: 55-65 minutes

Original release
- Network: ERT1 and ERT World
- Release: October 15, 2020 – June 23, 2022

I tourta tis mamas (English: Mοm's Cake) is the title of a Greek comedy television series that aired on ERT1 during the 2020-2022 season. Although viewers, as well as the series' cast, expressed their desire for it to continue for a third season, the station decided to end it in the summer of 2022.

== Plot ==
The series presents the life of a Greek family living under the same roof, and at whose table various guests pass by, each with their own story. The protagonists and hosts are the couple Vasilenas, Evanthia and Tasos, who live with their three children, Kyriakos with his wife Veta, and their sons Marios, Paris and Thomas, and Evanthia's mother, Marilou, who surround them.

== Cast ==
- Kostas Koklas as Tasos Vasilenas
- Kaiti Konstantinou as Evanthia Sekeri Vasilena
- Paris Thomopoulos as Paris Vasilenas
- Thanos Lekkas as Kyriakos Vasilenas
- Michalis Papadimitriou as Thomas Vasilenas
- Lydia Fotopoulou as Marilou Sekeri
- Ioanna Pylichou as Veta Kalatzi
- Alexandros Rigas as Akylas Sekeris
- Thanasis Maurogiannis as Marios Vasilenas (child)
- Chrysa Ropa as Alexandra Palaiologou Sekeri, mother of Tasos
- Yakinthi Papadopoulou as Myrto, family's neighbor
- Giorgos Tsiantoulas as Panagiotis Fratzilas, Paris partner
- Charis Chiotis as Zois, assistant of Tasos
- Dimitris Tsiokos as Giagos, grocery store manager
- Traintaphyllos Delis as Ntemi, family's Albanian neighbor
- Eirini Aggelopoulou as Tzeni, Thomas partner
- Efi Papatheodorou as Aunt Taso
- Zogia Sevastianou as Aggeliki, former secretary Minas Sekeris
