= Taxidevontas me tin Magia Tsokli =

- Genre: Documentary
- Written by: Magia Tsoklis
- Directed by: Chronis Pechlivanidis
- Country of origin: Greece
- Original language: Greek
- No. of seasons: 8

Production
- Production location: Greece
- Cinematography: Chronis Pechlivanidis
- Production company: Onos Productions www.onos.tv

Original release
- Network: ERT

Taxidevontas me tin Magia Tsokli (Greek: Ταξιδεύοντας με την Μάγια Τσόκλη; English: Travelling with Magia Tsokli) is a Greek television travelling documentary series airing on ERT. The series premiered on 2004 and continued for 8 seasons until 2013. In this series - the follow-up to Taxidevontas stin Ellada - Magia Tsokli expands her travels worldwide, from North America and the Caribbean to Asia and Africa.

== Seasons & episodes ==
Season 1 (2004-2005)

- Mali I
- Mali II, Festival in the Desert
- Jordan, Petra
- Syria I, Aleppo, Homs
- Syria II, Palmyra & Damascus
- Tajikistan
- Afghanistan
- Joshi, The festival of the Kalash
- South Africa

Season 2 (2005-2006)

- Sudan I, From Khartoum to Meroë
- Sudan II, North Sudan - Nubia
- Cuba I
- Cuba II
- Japan, Nagoya & Kyoto
- Rwanda & Zambia
  (Médecins du Monde)
- Pontus I, Trabzon
- Pontus II, Amasya
- Tuscany

Season 3 (2006-2007)

- Ethiopia I
- Ethiopia II, Adis Abeba
- Eritrea
- India, Varanasi
- Oasis of the Western Desert
  (East Sahara, Egypt)
- Guatemala I
- Guatemala II
- Zambia & Botswana

Season 4 (2007-2008)

- Greenland
- Morocco
- Kenya
- Uzbekistan I
- Uzbekistan II
- Yemen I
- Yemen II
- The Greeks of Africa: South Africa,
  Zambia, Kenya, Sudan & Morocco

Season 5 (2008-2009)

- Angola
- Nepal Ι
- Nepal ΙΙ
- Bhutan
- Mexico I, Mexico City
- Mexico II, Tijuana & Chihuahua
- Mexico ΙΙΙ, Day of the Dead
- Cape Verde

Season 6 (2009-2010)

- Zanzibar I, Stone Town
- Zanzibar II, From Zanzibar to Pemba
- Botswana, Okavango Delta
- Santiago de Compostela I
- Santiago de Compostela II
- New Orleans I, Mississippi
- New Orleans II

Season 7 (2010-2012)

- Benin
- Istanbul I
- Istanbul II
- Istanbul III
- Pakistan, Floods 2010
- India, Rajasthan & Mumbai
- Ethiopia, Tigray
- Uganda
- Evros river, The other side

Season 8 (2013)

- Madagascar I, Following the RN7
- Madagascar II
- South Cina I, Guangzhou
- South Cina II, Shenzhen
- New Orleans, Singing the Lord's word
- Corfu, with The Smile of the Child
- China, the One Child big experiment
