= Thanos Samaras =

Greek actor

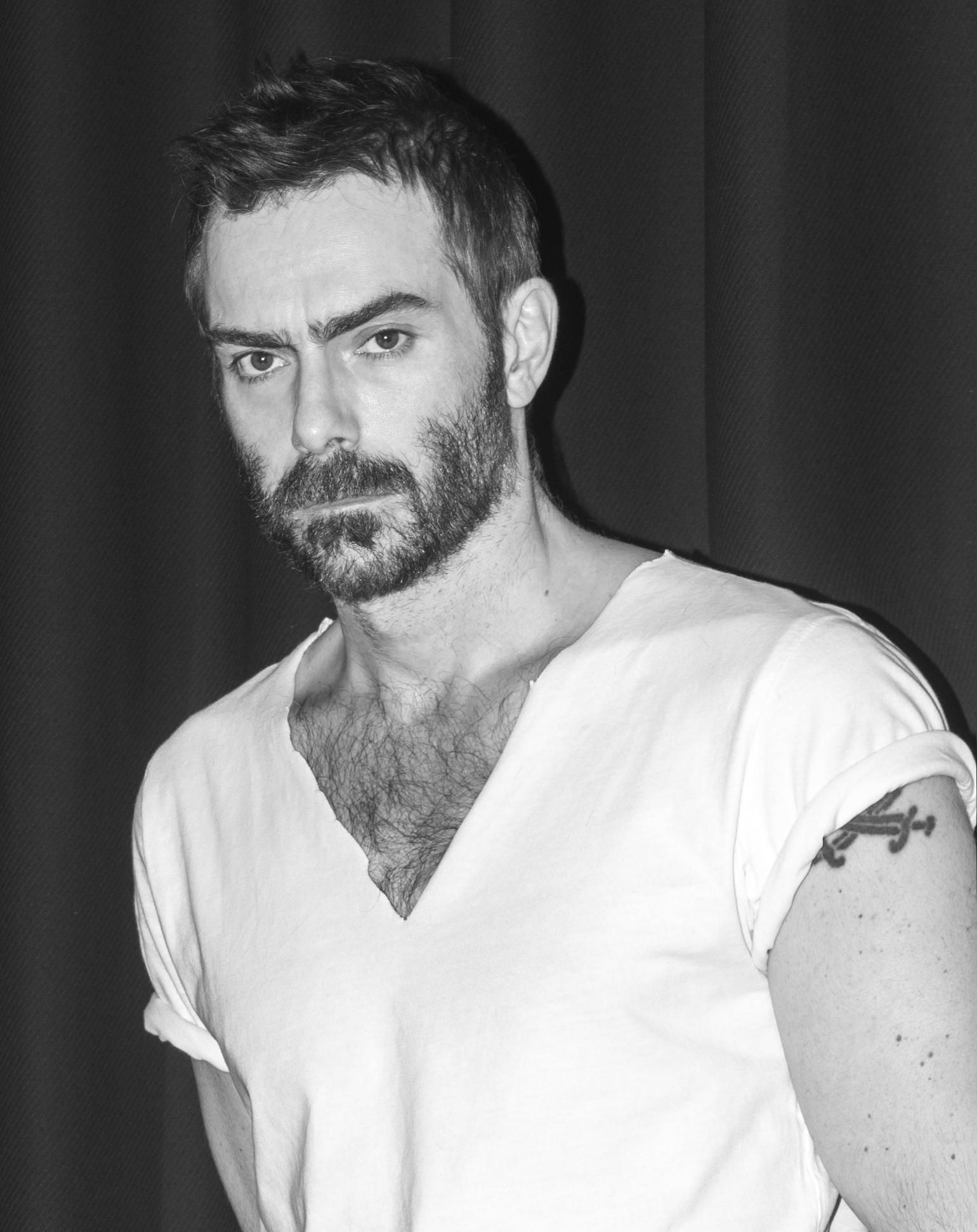
- Thanos Samaras
- Born: 6 August 1973 (age 53); Thessaloniki, Greece
- Education: Royal Academy of Dramatic Art
- Occupations: Actor; director
- Years active: 1999–present

Thanos Samaras (Greek: Θάνος Σαμαράς, born 6 August 1973) is a Greek-born film and theater actor and director based in New York City.

== Biography ==
Samaras trained at the Royal Academy of Dramatic Art (RADA) in London. Before attending drama school, he studied Art & Design at London Guildhall University, and was working towards a bachelor's degree in Architecture, only to drop out upon getting accepted at RADA. Following that, he took an internship at Richard Foreman's famed avant-garde Ontological Theater, in Saint Mark's Square in New York.

Samaras has starred in numerous Greek films, including Atlas (2004), Delivery (2004, Official Selection 61st Venice Film Festival), Valse Sentimentale (2007, Greek State Film Awards nomination Best Actor), Homeland (2010, Hellenic Film Academy Awards nomination Best Actor), Tied Red Thread (2011) as well as in the Australian film Dead Europe (2012).

Some of his stage work includes Anton in Marius von Mayenburg's Eldorado, Treplyov in Chekhov's The Seagull, Carl in Sarah Kane's Cleansed (Horn award nomination for Best New Actor), Oswald in Ibsen's Ghosts, Darren in Gary Owen's The Drowned World a.o.

Under the alias "Yatabazah" he designs and photographs toys. His work has been featured in Japanese and American magazines and books. In 2008, he had his first exhibition of doll photographs in Tokyo.

In May 2018, he directed the play "The Annunciation of Cassandra", by Dimitris Dimitriadis.

In June 2019, he directed the play "Chrysippus", by Dimitris Dimitriadis, at Athens - Epidaurus Festival.
