= I zoi en tafo =

- Genre: Drama; Anti-war
- Based on: I zoi en tafo by Stratis Myrivilis
- Written by: Tasos Psarras
- Directed by: Tasos Psarras
- Starring: Dimitris Mothonaios; Giannis Mpezos; Christina Cheila-Fameli; Karyofyllia Karampeti; Nikos Poursanidis
- Theme music composer: Neoklis Neofytidis
- Country of origin: Greece
- Original language: Greek
- No. of seasons: 1
- No. of episodes: 16

Production
- Executive producer: Viewmaster Films
- Producer: Giorgos Kyriakos
- Production locations: Mytilene; Macedonia; Lavrio; Ilion
- Running time: 45-48 minutes

Original release
- Network: ERT1, ERT2
- Release: January 31 – June 12, 2019

I zoi en tafo (English: Life in the tomb) is a Greek drama series, which was broadcast by ERT in 2019 and is based on the novel of the same name by Stratis Myrivilis. The first episode was broadcast on January 31, 2019 and the last on June 12, 2019.

It is the first Greek television series to be broadcast by ERT, ten years after the series Karyotakis.

== Plot ==
Following the love letters of Antonis Kostoulas, a volunteer soldier in the Archipelago Division, with the tender Myrsini, a teacher at the Girls' School of Mytilene, we follow the steps of the political developments that lead us to World War I, but more generally we sail through a timeless look at the inhumane conditions and the destructive futility of every war. A wonderfully sensitive love story that grows like "a poppy" in the gloomy trenches.

== Cast ==
- Dimitris Mothonaios as Antonis Kostoulas
- Giannis Mpezos as General Ioannou-Mpalafaras
- Christina Cheila-Fameli as Myrsini
- Karyofyllia Karampeti as Antzo
- Nikos Poursanidis as Stratis Myrivilis
- Giorgos Armenis as Thymios Kostoulas
- Dimitris Imellos as Fanariotis
- Errikos Litsis as Cashier
- Iliana Mavromati as Stylianoula
- Vaggelis Stratigakos as Leonidas
