= Kaiti Konstantinou =

- Καίτη Κωνσταντίνου
- Born: Aikaterini Konstantinou; December 18, 1962; Rododafni, Achaea, Greece
- Died: March 10, 2025 (aged 62); Athens, Attica, Greece
- Burial place: Rododafni, Achaea, Greece
- Education: Higher Drama School of Theatre Arts "Karolos Koun"; School of Philosophy of the National and Kapodistrian University of Athens
- Occupation: Actress
- Years active: 1989-2024

Kaiti Konstantinou (December 18, 1962 – March 10, 2025) was a Greek comedic actress of theatre, film and television.

She became particularly known for her role as Soso Papadima in the comedy series Eglimata (1998-2000). She participated in many television series, theatre plays and films.

== Biography ==
She was born in Rododafni, Achaea. She simultaneously completed the Philosophy and Drama School of the Art Theatre, from which she graduated in 1986, together with her friends, Maria Kavogianni and Iro Mane. She had also worked as a philologist.

Her first role was in the play "Inner Voices" at the Art Theater. She became widely known for her performance as Soso Papadima in the series Eglimata. She had participated in many plays, as well as films and television series.

For the last two years of her life, she battled an aggressive form of cancer. She died of it in a private hospital in Athens after a short hospitalization, on 10 March 2025, at the age of 62. She was buried in her hometown of Rododafni, Achaea, two days later.
