= Maya Tsoclis =

Greek journalist (born 1963)

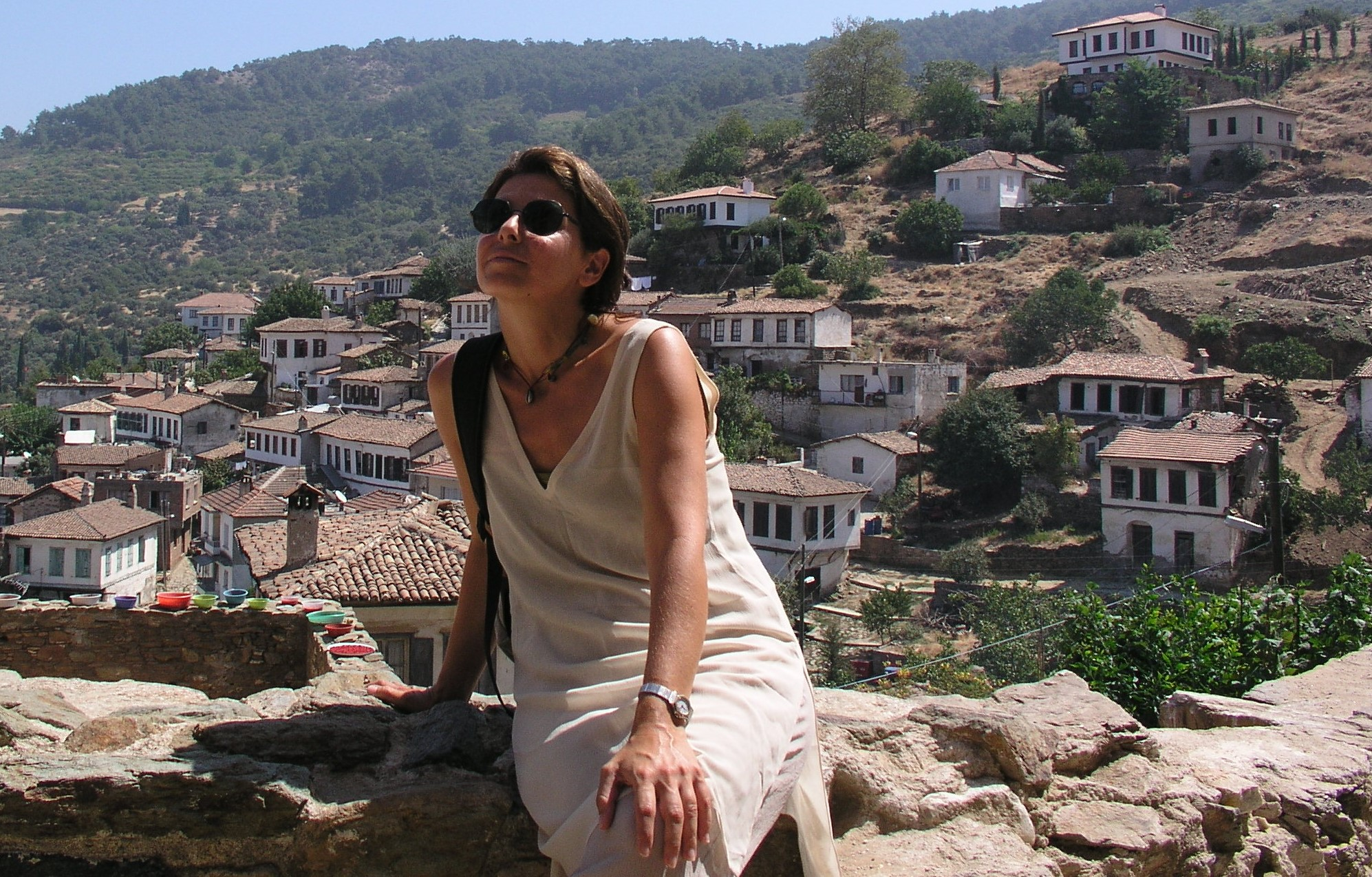
Maya while filming in Sirince, Turkey

Maya Tsoclis, born on 5 August 1963 in Paris, is an acclaimed Greek travel journalist and former Member of Parliament. Maya Tsoclis studied sociology in France and worked in the fashion business as a designer for a decade before getting interested in travel journalism and documentaries. The documentary series Taxidevontas stin Ellada (Travelling in Greece, 1999-2003) and its sequel Taxidevontas me tin Magia Tsokli (Travelling with Maya Tsoclis, 2004-2013) with more than 180 hours of programming on public television made her a household name in Greece. Her shows, filmed in more than 70 countries, received multiple awards.

From 2005 to 2010, Maya was the editor-in-chief of Passport magazine, a monthly travel magazine published by Kathimerini publications.

She was elected member of parliament in the election of 2009 as a candidate with PASOK. She resigned in 2012, after voting the sixth austerity package.

In 2016, Maya created the documentary series “A Day (in the life of)”, a human-centered format built around in-depth interviews with influential personalities from across Greece. Through personal stories, life choices, and professional journeys, the series offered an intimate portrait of contemporary Greek society, placing the individual—rather than the public role—at the heart of the narrative.

In 2023, she presented “Routes of the Greek Diaspora” for ERT, a 10 episode documentary journey across the United States. Through encounters with dynamic and often lesser-known members of the Greek diaspora, the series unfolded the broader history of Greek migration and settlement in America. Personal testimonies, collective memory, and questions of identity intertwined, shedding light on the enduring ties between Greece and its diaspora.

Maya is also the creator of various travel magazines and websites, runs Koumaros Theatre, an open air theater and is the co-founder of NISSOS Beer, an internationally awarded craft beer made in the island of Tinos.

Maya is the daughter of Greek artist Costas Tsoclis.

== Television series ==
- 2023 Series Routes of the Greek Diaspora
- Mia Mera (2014)
- Taxidevontas me tin Magia Tsokli (2004–2013)
- Taxidevontas stin Ellada (1999–2004)
