= Vassilis Charalampopoulos (actor) =

Greek actor

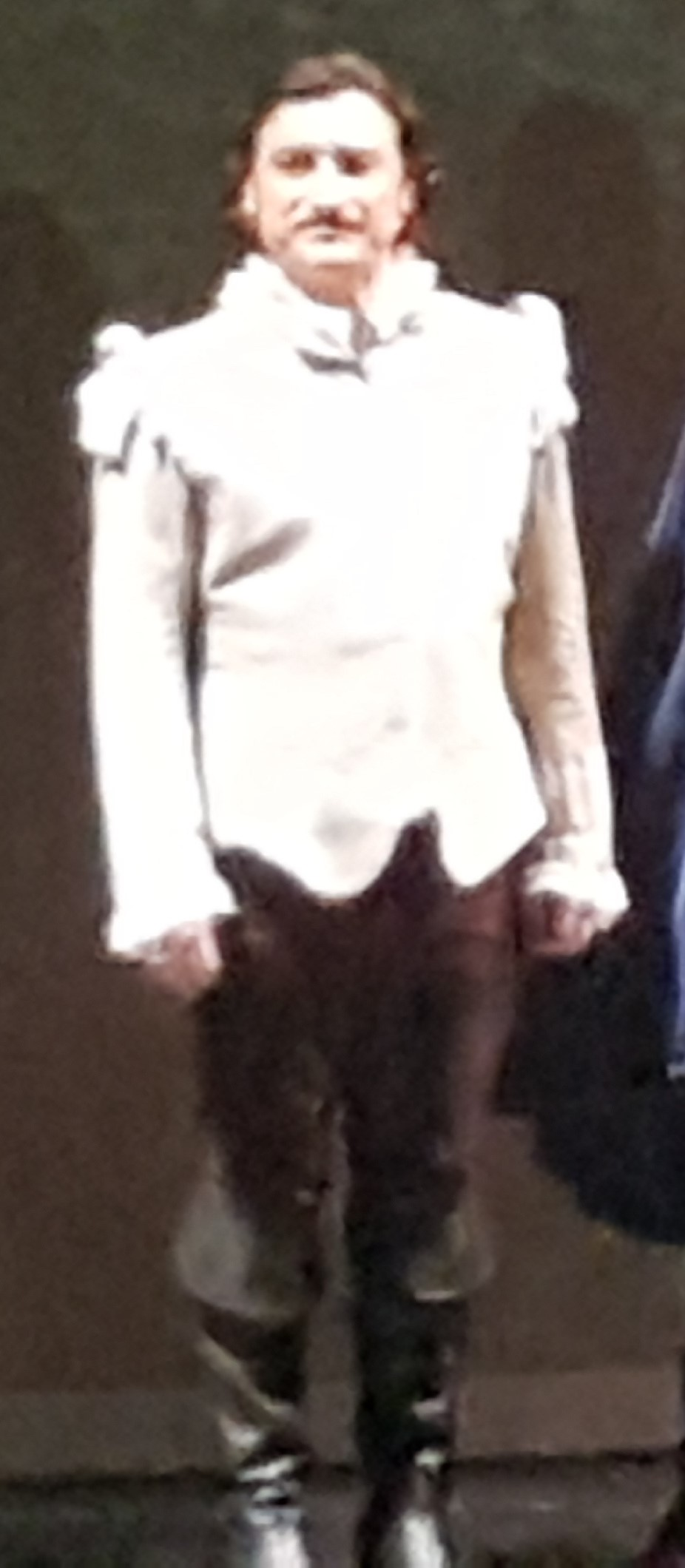
- Vassilis Charalampopoulos, greek actor, as Shakespeare in "Shakespeare in love" performance in Ellinikos Kosmos Theatre, Dec. 2018
- Born: September 28 1970 (age 55); Athens, Greece
- Occupation: Actor

Vassilis Charalampopoulos (born 28 September 1970) is a Greek actor. He has played in numerous successful films, such as the film Bank Bang or the TV series Eisai to Tairi mou, Englimata and To Deka. He has won a Greek State Film Award for the film Pente Lepta Akoma and one television award for the TV Series To Deka. He has also won one theatrical award for the play The Frogs of Aristophanes that was presented in 2003.

== Biography ==
Vassilis Charalampopoulos was born on 28 September 1970, in Athens. He graduated from the Dramatic School of Athens Odeon in 1992. He appeared in his first TV series in 1992. His first great success was his role in the comedy Englimata and subsequently the comedy Eisai to Tairi mou. Later he had leading parts in comedy films such as Bank Bang and Pente Lepta Akoma. He has won one cinema award for the film Pente Lepta Akoma. Also has won one television award for his role in the TV Series To Deka and one Theatre award.

== Selected filmography ==
=== Movies ===
- Email (2000)
- R20 (2004)
- Loafing and Camouflage: Sirens in the Aegean (2005)
- Pente Lepta Akoma (2006)
- Bank Bang (2008)
- Pethaino Gia Sena (2009)

=== TV series ===
- Eglimata (1998–1999)
- Eisai to Tairi mou (2000–2001)
- The 10 (2007–2008)
- Me lene Vangeli (2011)

== Cinema awards ==
Awards
| Year | Award | Category | Film | Result |
|---|---|---|---|---|
| 2006 | Greek State Film Awards | Best actor | Pente Lepta Akoma | Won |

== Filmography ==
=== Television ===
| Year | Title | Role(s) | Notes |
|---|---|---|---|
| 1991 | The yellow envelope | waiter | 1 episode |
| 1992 | Folder Amazon | | 2 episodes |
| 1992–1993 | Dyed Red Hair | Janes | 5 episodes |
| 1992–1994 | The Widower and the Worst | Vasilakis | Series regular / 50 episodes |
| 1993–1994 | The execution | | 2 episodes |
| 1994 | The Ridiculousness of It | Philip's son | Episode: "Sometimes it's good to have poetry in your life" |
| 1994–1995 | Bears & Lights | Bug | Lead role / 18 episodes |
| 1995–2003 | 10 Mikroi Mitsoi | gay hairdresser | Lead role / 13 episodes |
| 1997 | In Thanaton | son | 3 episodes |
| 1997–1998 | Love was a Day Late | | 5 episodes |
| 1999–2000 | Crimes | Johnny Karathanos | Lead role / 39 episodes |
| 2000–2001 | Dog Life | Sotiris Sotiriou | Lead role / 21 episodes |
| 2001–2002 | You're My Mate | Grigoris Kapernaros | Lead role / 30 episodes |
| 2002 | Red Cycle | Christos / doctor's son | Episodes: "The Scissors" / "Trojan War" |
| 2002 | If only you knew | driver teacher | 1 episode |
| 2004 | Seven deadly mothers-in-law | Christos Terzidis | Episode: "The Doctorfriendly Mother-in-Law" |
| 2004 | 10th mandate | Manos | Episode: "The blood pact" |
| 2004–2005 | Babalou | Stathis Kaloudas | Lead role / 16 episodes |
| 10th mandate | Simos / Christopher | Episodes: "...in vain" / "Intoxication" | |
| 2006 | Honorable Cuckolds | Yannakis | Episode: "The Baby Cuckold" |
| 2007 | Safe Sex TV Stories | Vasilis | Episode: "Adonis Agency" |
| 2007 | 10th mandate | Himself | Episode: "The end" |
| 2007–2008 | The Ten | Michalis Fountoukos | Lead role / 18 episodes |
| 2009 | Working woman | Mitsos | Episode: "Popi's Pie" |
| 2011–2012 | My name is Vangelis | Vangelis Fameligkos | Lead role / 18 episodes |
| 2014 | Through This | Mikes | Episode: "Babis" |
| 2018 | 10 Mikroi Mitsoi | gay hairdresser | 2 episodes |
| 2020–2023 | Ta Kalytera mas Chronia | Angelos Antonopoulos (narrator) | Lead role |
| 2021 | Carte Postale | Akis | Episode: "The boy in the silver suit" |
