= List of programs broadcast by Mega Channel =

This article lists programs broadcast by Mega Channel and on Mega Cosmos for international viewers from Greece:

== Series ==
=== Action/mystery ===
- Skorpios (Scorpio) 1994-1995 - starring and directed by Antonis Kafetzopoulos
- Peirasmos (Temptation) 1995-1996 - starring Stavros Zalmas
- Epifaneia (Surface) 2001-2002 - starring Pemu Zouni
- Me Thea to Pelago (With View to the Sea) 2003-2004 - written by Elena Akrita and Giorgos Kyritsis
- Ihni (Traces) 2007-2008 - starring Giannis Zouganelis
- Eglimata mistiriou (2020-2021)

=== Drama ===
- H Dipsa (Thirst) 1989-1991 - starring Giannis Voglis
- Spiti gia Pente (A House for Five) 1991-1992 - starring Karmem Rouggeri
- Gynaikes (Women) 1992-1993 - written by Mirella Papaoikonomou
- Africa 1992-1993 - starring Nikos Sergianopoulos and Stavros Zalmas
- Oi Frouroi tis Achaeas (Achaea's Guards) 1992-1993 - starring Mimi Ntenisi and Stratos Tzortzoglou
- Anastasia 1993-1994 - written by Mirella Papaoikonomou
- Esu Apofasizeis (It's Your Decision) 1993-1996 - starring Giannis Vouros
- Mi Fovasai ti Fotia (Don't Be Afraid of the Fire) 1994-1995 - written by Mirella Papaoikonomou
- To Teleutaio Antio (The Last Goodbye) 1994-1995 - starring Giorgos Kimoulis and Kariofyllia Karampeti
- Apon (Absent) 1995-1996 - written by Mirella Papaoikonomou, starring Yannis Bezos
- Palirria (Tide) 1996-1997 - starring Nikos Sergianopoulos and Stratos Tzortzoglou
- Logo Timis (Due to my Honour) - written by Mirella Papaoikonomou
- Tzivaeri 1997-1998 - starring Vana Mparmpa
- Psithuroi Kardias (Whispers of the Hearts) 1997-1998 - Directed by Manousos Manousakis
- I Zoi Pou Den Ezisa (The Life I Didn't Lived) 1998-1999 - written by Mirella Papaoikonomou
- To Simadi tou Erota (Love's Sign) 1998-1999 - starring Vana Mparmpa and Stratos Tzortzoglou
- I Aithousa tou Thronou (Throne's Chamber) 1998-1999 - starring Alekos Alexandrakis
- Thumata Eirinis (Victims of Peace) 1998-1999 - starring Anna-Maria Papaharalambous
- O Megalos Thumos (The Big Anger) 1998-1999 - starring Gregoris Valtinos and Kariofyllia Karampeti
- Vendetta 1999-2000 - starring Giannis Fertis and Koralia Karanti
- Sti Skia tou Polemou (In War's Shadow) 1999-2000 - starring Mimi Ntenisi and Stratos Tzortzoglou
- H Zoi mas Mia Volta (Our Life is a Walk) 1999-2000 - starring Christoforos Papakaliatis and Fylareti Komninou
- Fugame (Let's Go) 1999-2000 - Directed by Nikos Koutelidakis
- Aerines Siopes (Silence in the Air) 2000-2003 - starring Marios Athanasiou, Katerina Papoutsaki and Panagiota Vlanti
- Na Me Proseheis (Take Care of Me) 2000-2001 - starring Konstantinos Markoulakis and Christoforos Papakaliatis
- Alma Libre (Free Soul) 2001-2002 - starring Nikos Sergianopoulos
- Fevga (Leave) 2002-2003 - starring Themis Mpazaka
- Kleise ta Matia (Close your Eyes) 2002-2004 - starring Pemu Zouni and Christoforos Papakaliatis
- Leni 2003-2004 - written by Mirella Papaoikonomou, starring Katia Dandoulaki
- Se Apostasi Anapnois (Too Close) 2003-2004 - starring Kostas Sommer and Maria Solomou
- Etsi Ksafnika (Suddenly) 2004-2005 - written by Mirella Papaoikonomou, starring Konstantinos Markoulakis
- Sto Fos tou Feggariou (Under the Moonlight) 2004-2005 - starring Lina Sakka
- Epafi (Contact) 2004-2005 - starring Nikos Sergianopoulos
- Metrao Stigmes (Counting Moments) 2004-2005 - starring Stavros Zalmas
- Gi kai Ouranos (Earth and Sky) 2005-2006 - starring Konstantinos Markoulakis
- Duo Meres Mono (Only Two Days) 2005-2007 - starring Christoforos Papakaliatis
- Oi Magisses tis Smyrnis (The Witches of Smyrna) 2005-2006 - starring Maria Kavogianni
- Mazi Sou (With You) 2006-2007 - starring Apostolos Totsikas
- Stous 31 Dromous (In the 31 Streets) 2007-2008 - starring Sofia Karvela
- Agria Paidia (Wild Kids) 2008-2009 - starring Antinoos Almpanis
- Xara Agnoeitai (Chara is Missing) 2008-2009 - starring Maria Kavogianni
- Koukles (Dolls) 2010-2011 - starring Lina Sakka and Dimitra Matsouka
- To Nisi (The Island) 2010-2011 - starring Katerina Lehou and Stelios Mainas
- Silent Road (Σιωπηλός δρόμος) 2021 – starring Penelope Tsilika and Dimitris Lalos

=== Soap operas ===
- Apagorevmeni Agapi (Forbidden Love) 1998-2006 - starring Marios Athanasiou
- Gia Mia Thesi ston Hlio (For a Place in the Sun) 1999-2002 - starring Petros Fyssoun
- Filodoksies (Ambitions) 2002-2006 - starring Giannis Vouros
- Vera Sto Dexi 2004-2007 - written by Elena Akrita and Giorgos Kyritsis, starring Katia Dandoulaki and Kostas Kazakos
- Maria, i Aschimi (Ugly Maria) 2006-2008 - Greek version of the Colombian TV series Yo soy Betty, la fea starring Aggeliki Daliani
- Komplicoj al la rekupero (Accomplices to the Rescue) 2007 - Greek version of the Mexican telenovela Cómplices Al Rescate
- Mia Stigmi, Duo Zoes (One Moment, Two Lives) 2007-2009 - starring Giannis Papazisis
- Amoj plumbo (Amores Lead) 2008 - Greek version of the Mexican telenovela Amores, querer con alevosia
- Ta Mustika tis Edem (Eden's Secrets) 2008-2011 - written by Elena Akrita and Giorgos Kyritsis, starring Danis Katranidis
- H Zoi tis Allis (The Other Woman's Life) 2009-2012 - starring Katia Dandoulaki; Greek version of the Mexican telenovela Querida Enemiga
- Klemmena Oneira (Stolen Dreams) 2011–2015 - starring Alexandros Stavrou

=== Romantic comedies ===
- Ax Elen (Oh, Helen) 1992-1993 - starring Eleni Radou
- Love Sorry (1994-1995) - starring Tasos Chalkias
- Ntoltse Vita (Sweet Life) 1995-1996 - starring Anna Panayiotopoulou, Katiana Balanika and Maria Foka
- Dyo Ksenoi (Two Strangers) 1997-1999 - starring Nikos Sergianopoulos and Evelina Papoulia
- Eimaste ston Aera (We Are On Air) 1997-1999 - starring Thodoris Atheridis
- Kati Trexei Me Tous Dipla (There's Something Wrong with the Neighbors) 1999-2000 - starring Dimitra Matsouka
- Esu Ftais (It's Your Fault) 1999-2000 - starring Renia Louizidou
- Peri Anemon kai Ydaton (About Everything) 2000-2003 - starring Spyros Papadopoulos and Thanasis Veggos
- Eisai to Tairi mou (You Are My Love Mate) 2001-2002 - starring Vicky Stavropoulou and Alexis Georgoulis
- Fae ti Sokolata Sou (Eat Your Chocolate) 2003-2004 - starring Anna Panayiotopoulou and Nikos Sergianopoulos
- S1ngles 2004-2008 - starring Maria Solomou
- Kaneis de leei s' agapo (No One Says I Love You) 2004-2005 - starring Anna-Maria Papaharalambous, Giorgos Karamihos and Kostas Triantafyllopoulos
- Lakis o Glykoulis (The Adorable Lakis) 2008-2009 - starring Petros Filipidis

=== Comedies ===
- Oi Treis Harites (The Three Graces) 1990-1993 - starring Anna Panayiotopoulou, Nena Menti and Mina Adamaki
- Oi Aftheretoi 1990-1991 - starring Vasia Trifili
- Oi Aparadektoi (The Unacceptables) 1991-1993 - starring Spyros Papadopoulos, Dimitra Papadopoulou, Yannis Bezos and Vlassis Bonatsos
- Ekmek Pagoto (Ekmek Ice cream) 1991-1992 - starring Spyros Papadopoulos and Chrisoula Diavati
- H Eliza kai oi Alloi (Eliza and the Others) 1992-1993 - starring Mirka Papakonstantinou
- Kai oi Tesseris Itan Yperoxes (The Four Were Great) 1992-1995 - starring Maria Foka
- To Dis Eksamartin 1993-1996 - starring Nena Menti
- Rozalia 1993-1994 - starring Anna Panayiotopoulou
- O Ios tou Patera (The Father's Son) 1996-1998 - starring Tasos Chalkias
- O Kakos Vezuris 1997-1998 - starring Haris Romas
- Oi Andres Den Yparxoun Pia (Men Don't Exist Anymore) 1998-2000 - starring Katerina Lexou
- S'Agapo M'Agapas (I Love You, You Love Me) 2000-2002 - starring Dimitra Papadopoulou and Thodoris Atheridis
- Ti Psyhi Tha Paradoseis Mori? (What Soul Are You Going To Give To God, You Fool Woman) 2000-2001 - starring Eleni Radou
- Kapou Se Ksero (I Know You From Somewhere) 2001-2002 - starring Maria Kavogianni and Kaiti Konstantinou
- Savvatogennimenes (Born on Saturday) 2003-2004 - starring Eleni Radou
- Safe Sex: The TV Series 2005-2008 - a series based on the box office hit movie Safe Sex
- 50-50 (Fifty-Fifty) 2005-2007 - starring Petros Filipidis, Pavlos Haikalis and Sakis Mpoulas
- Sto Para Pente (In the Nick of Time) 2005-2007 - starring Giorgos Kapoutzidis, Smaragda Karydi
- To Kokkino Domatio (The Red Room) 2005-2008 - written by Alexandros Rigas and Dimitris Apostolou
- Pali Apo Tin Arhi (Again From the Beginning) 2006-2007 - starring Memos Begnis and Anta Livitsanou
- Mavra Mesanyxta (Black Midnight) 2007-2009 - starring Stelios Mainas
- L.A.P.D. 2008-2010 - starring Ieroklis Mihailidis
- Ola ston Aera (Everything on Air) 2008-2009 - starring Maria Lekaki and Katiana Balanika
- H Genia Ton 592 Euro (The Generation of 592 Euro) 2010-2011 - starring Spyros Papadopoulos
- Me lene Vaggeli (Me lene Vaggeli) 2011-2012 - starring Vasilis Haralampopoulos
- Kliniki Periptwsi 2011-2012 - starring Yannis Bezos
- Me Ta Pantelonia Kato 2013-2014 - starring Ieroklis Mihailidis
- Kato Partali 2014–2015 - starring Giannis Tsimitselis
- Mia mera pano sti Gi (2020-2021)

=== Family comedies ===
- Patir, Ios kai Agio Pnevma (Father, Son and Holy Ghost) 1989-1990 - starring Spyros Papadopoulos
- To Retire 1990-1992 - starring Katerina Gioulaki
- Ta Epta Kaka tis Moiras Mou (The Seven Wrongs of My Fate) 1991-1994 - starring Giorgos Konstantinou
- Mana Einai Mono Mia (Mother is Only One) 1992-1994 - starring Mary Chronopoulou
- Oi Mikromessaioi (The Middle-class People) 1992-1993 - starring Martha Karagianni
- To Soi Mas (Our Family) 1992-1994 - starring Ntina Konsta
- Hi Rock 1992-1994 - starring Petros Filipidis and Tasos Chalkias
- Emeis ki Emeis (Just Us) 1994-1998 - starring Eleni Gerasimidou
- O Petros kai ta Koritsia tou (Peter and his Girls) 1994-1996 - starring Petros Filipidis
- Kare tis Ntamas 1997-1999 - starring Joyce Evidi
- Me Dyo Mamades (With Two Mothers) 1998-1999 - starring Nena Menti and Chrysa Ropa
- Deka Lepta Kirigma (Ten Minutes Preaching) 2000-2004 - starring Dimitris Kouroumpalis
- Epta Thanasimes Petheres (Seven Deadly Mothers-in-Law) 2003-2010 - starring Vicky Stavropoulou
- I Ntanta (The Nanny) 2003-2005 - Greek version of the American sitcom The Nanny, starring Maria Lekaki
- I Ora I Kali (2004-2007) - starring Panos Mixalopoulos
- Eftyhismenoi Mazi (Happy Together) 2007-2009 - starring Yannis Bezos
- Latremenoi mou Geitones (My Lovely Neighbors) 2007-2009 - starring Kostas Koklas
- I Polykatoikia (The Block of Flats) 2008-2011 - starring Pavlos Haikalis
- Paidiki Hara (Playground) 2009-2010 - Kostas Koklas, Renia Louizidou, Giorgos Alevizakis, Giannis Kyrikos and Vasilis Galaios.
- Piso sto spiti 2011-2013 - starring Maria Kavogianni
- To Spiti tis Emmas 2013-2014- starring Yannis Bezos-Katia Dandoulaki
- Monterna Oikogeneia 2014–present - starring Antonis Kafetzopoulos
- Mana X Ouranou 2014–present - starring Maria Solomou

== Shows ==
=== Various shows ===
- Mega Star 1989-2010 and 2020-2021- a music show presenting the most popular songs in Greece
  - 1989-1990 hosted by Arianna Dimitropoulou
  - 1990-1991 hosted by Rika Vagiani and Nikos Diamantaropoulos
  - 1992-2004 hosted by Natalia Germanou
  - 2004-2005 hosted by Betty Maggira
  - 2005-2007 hosted by Evi Adam
  - 2007-2008 hosted by Ioanna Kanellopoulou
  - 2008-2010 hosted by Katerina Stikoudi
  - 2020-2021 hosted by Mando Gasteratou and DJ Antonis Dimitriades
- Disney Club 1993-2002 - Greek version of the popular children's show
- Traction 1998–2011 - a show about cars and motorcycles hosted by Kostas Stefanis
- Stin Kouzina Olotaxws 2000-2004 - a show about cooking hosted by Ilias Mamalakis
- Rantevou gia Cinema 2000-2009 - a show about cinema presenting the new releases in a weekly basis hosted by Orestis Andreadakis
- Ta Mustika tis Vefas 2003-2004 - a cooking show hosted by Vefa Alexiadou
- Mpoukia kai Sugxwrio 2003-2008 - a cooking show hosted by Ilias Mamalakis traveling around Greece, finding traditional recipes
- Megalicious Chart Live 2005-2006 - countdown of top music charts and live performances of Greek stars hosted by Themis Georgantas
- Extreme Makeover 2008-2009 - the Greek version of the American show, hosted by Zeta Douka
- Glykies Alximies 2008-2010 - a cooking show hosted by Stelios Parliaros focusing on pastry
- Food and the City 2010-2011 - a cooking show hosted by Vasilis Kallidis

=== Morning shows ===
- Xamogelate Einai Metadotiko 1993-1995 hosted by Andreas Mikroutsikos
- Metaxi Mas 1995-1998 hosted by Sofia Vossou and Elda Panopoulou
- San Sto Spiti Sas 1999-2003 hosted by Fotis Sergoulopoulos and Maria Mpakodimou
- Omorfos Kosmos To Prwi 2003-2010
  - 2003-2009 hosted by Grigoris Arnaoutoglou
  - 2009-2010 hosted by Nikos Papadakis
- Proino Mou 2010–2014
  - 2010–2013 hosted by Giorgos Liagkas and Fei Skorda
  - 2013–2014 hosted by Petros Kostopoulos and Jenny Balatsinou

== Game shows ==
- Tilemplofes 1989 (Revival of the Greek version of Break the Bank) hosted by Vasilis Tsivilikas
- Kontres 1991-1995 (original Greek version of Family Feud) hosted by Vlassis Bonatsos
- Rantevou sta Tyfla 1991-1998
  - 1991-1996 hosted by Vasia Trifili
  - 1996-1998 hosted by Isavella Vlasiadou
- Mega Banca Show 1992-1995 (Greek version of Bob's Full House / Trump Card) hosted by Giorgos Polychroniou
- To Megalo Pazari 1992-1995 (Greek version of Let's Make a Deal) hosted by Andreas Mikroutsikos
- Rouk Zouk 1994-1997 (Greek version of Bruce Forsyth's Hot Streak / Ruck Zuck) hosted by Mary Miliaresi
- Risko 1995-1997 (Greek version of Wipeout) hosted by Giorgos Polichroniou
- H Agora tou Aiona 1997 (Greek revival of Sale of the Century) hosted by Mary Miliaresi
- Kontra Plake 1995-1999 (revived/remade Greek version of Family Feud) hosted by Spyros Papadopoulos
- Vres ti Frasi 1998-2001 (Greek version of Catch Phrase)
  - 1998-2000 hosted by Miltos Makridis
  - 2000-2001 hosted by Joyce Evidi
- Poios Thelei Na Ginei Ekatommyriouxos 1999-2002 (Greek version of Who Wants To Be A Millionaire) hosted by Spyros Papadopoulos
- O Pio Adunamos Krikos 1999-2002 (Greek version of The Weakest Link) hosted by Elena Akrita
- Taxi Girl 2006-2010 (Greek Version of Cash Cab) hosted by Vicky Stavropoulou
- Eisodimatias 2007-2009 hosted by Grigoris Arnaoutoglou
- Power of 10 2008-2009 (Greek version of the American game show of the same name) hosted by Konstantinos Markoulakis
- H Ekdikisi tis Ksanthias 2008-2009 hosted by Giorgos Liagas
- Fifty Fifty 2010-2011 hosted by Giorgos Liagas
- Money Drop 2010-2011 (Greek version of the British game show The Million Pound Drop) hosted by Grigoris Arnaoutoglou
- 1,000,000 yien 2020-2021 (Gameshow, hosted by Smaragda Karidi)

== Entertainment ==
- Akouna Matata 1998-1999 hosted by Christos Ferentinos, who travels around Greece talking to the local people
- Omorfos Kosmos 2002-2003 hosted by Grigoris Arnaoutoglou; the show has the same concept as Ferentinos' show Akouna Matata
- Backstage 2003-2006 - news and information about the world of show biz. Features the latest from TV, movies, music, fashion, nightlife and more hosted by Giorgos Satsidis
- I Love TV 2004-2006 - a variety show with guests from all avenues of entertainment, from singers to dancers to athletes to actors, hosted by Fotis Sergoulopoulos and Maria Mpakodimou
- Prive 2004-2006 - a talk show featuring interviews with famous stars hosted by Elena Katritsi
- Oi Kipouroi tou Mega 2010-2011 - a show hosted by Makis Tsokas, Giannis Panayiotopoulos and Sotiris Vrettos about gardening

== Reality/talent shows ==
- Na I Eukairia 1989-2003 - talent show
  - 1989-1990 hosted by Sofia Aliberti
  - 2001-2002 hosted by Eva Kotanidi
  - 2002-2003 hosted by Aleka Kamila
- Bar 2001-2002 - reality show hosted by Miltos Makridis
- Popstars 2002-2003 - Greek version of the talent show
- H Farma 2002-2004 - reality show
  - 2002-2003 hosted by Grigoris Arnaoutoglou
  - 2003-2004 hosted by Hlias Valasis
- Party 2003-2004 - reality show hosted by Katerina Laspa
- Super Idol 2003-2004 - Greek version of the talent show Pop Idol, hosted by Themis Georgantas
- Survivor 2002-2007 - Greek version of the famous reality show
  - 2002-2004 hosted by Grigoris Arnaoutoglou
  - 2006-2007 hosted by Konstantinos Markoulakis
- So You Think You Can Dance 2006-2008 - Greek version of the talent show hosted by Vicky Kaya
- MasterChef Greece 2010-2012 - Greek version of the cooking show
  - 2010-2011 hosted by Eugenia Manolidou
  - 2011-2012 hosted by Mary Sinatsaki
- Just the Two of Us 2010-2011 and 2013-2014 - Greek version of the reality singing contest hosted by Giorgos Kapoutzidis
- Junior MasterChef Greece 2011-2012 - Greek version of the cooking show hosted by Maria Bekatorou

== Night shows ==
- Alla Kolpa 1994-1996 hosted by Vlassis Bonatsos
- Bravo 1994-2000 hosted by Roula Koromila
- Oti Kalutero 1998-2000 hosted by Anna Drouza
- Apo Stoma Se Stoma 2003-2004 hosted by Fotis Sergoulopoulos and Maria Mpakodimou
- Zo Ena Drama 2004-2005 hosted by Takis Zaharatos
- Poly tin Kyriaki 2005-2007 hosted by Grigoris Arnaouroglou
  - 2005-2006 co-hosted by Marietta Chrousala
  - 2006-2007 co-hosted by Kalomoira
- Sto spiti me to Mega (We stay at home) (March 2020-today)

== Sports ==
- Coppa Italia (final only in 2019–20)
- FA Cup (from quarter finals in 2019–20)
- Taça de Portugal (final only in 2019–20)
- UEFA Champions League (2021-2024)
- UEFA Super Cup (2021-2024)

== See also ==
- Mega Channel
