= Anna Kyriakou =

Greek actress (1929–2025)

- Άννα Κυριακού
- Born: 17 January 1929; Athens, Greece
- Died: 13 October 2025 (aged 96); Athens, Greece
- Citizenship: Greece
- Education: National Theatre of Greece Drama School
- Occupations: Actress; writer
- Years active: 1945–2007
- Employer: Finos Film
- Spouse: Margaritis Apostolidis (died 2005)
- Children: 1

Anna Kyriakou (Greek: Άννα Κυριακού; 17 January 1929 – 13 October 2025) was a Greek actress, known for playing the role of Psyche in 1964 film Zorba the Greek.

== Early life and career ==
Kyriakou was born in Athens on 17 January 1929. She studied at the Drama School of the National Theatre, as well as at the Charles Dullin School in Paris, with Jean Vilar as her teacher. She made her first theatrical appearance as a teenager at the REX Theatre with the Marika Kotopouli company in the play Carmen and collaborated with Manolidou-Pappa, Vassilis Logothetidis, Katerina, Manos Katrakis etc.

In 1953, she collaborated with Dimitris Myrat's company. Returning from Paris, she collaborated in leading roles with the companies of Iliopoulos, Fotopoulos and Alexandrakis. In 1959 she starred in the Piraeus Theatre of Dimitris Rodiris in the plays The Mistress of the Inn, The Marriage of Figaro, and Electra to follow a period of more than 20 years of collaboration with the National Theatre, starting with a great success as Calliope in Temptation by Gregorios Xenopoulos. Her appearance in the cinema was also notable: The Drunkard (1950), Liar Wanted (1961), Bridegroom Urgently Wanted (1971), Safe Sex (1999), Crying... Silicon Tears (2001), Blackmail Boy (2003) etc.

She took part in many TV series, from Him and Him, Our Neighbor and the 1970s Jugerman, to The Three Graces in which she played the legendary Aunt Bebeka. She appeared in a guest role in Constantine’s and Helens, playing the role of Aunt Maro, as well as in Seven Deadly Mothers-in-Law, where she played the evil mother-in-law. Her theatrical repertoire on the radio is particularly rich, in the well-known shows The Theater on the Radio.

== Personal life and death ==
Kyriakou married the architect Margaritis Apostolidis (1921–2005). They had a son, Christos (b. 1955).

Kyriakou died on 13 October 2025, at age 96. Her body was cremated on 15 October 2025.

== Filmography ==
Films with Kyriakou include:

- Do You Love Me? (2006)
- Epta thanasimes petheres (2006)
- Silence (2004)
- Blackmail Boy (2003)
- Crying... Silicon Tears (2001)
- Athens Blues (2001)
- Sti skia tou polemou (1999)
- Safe Sex (1999)
- Konstantinou kai Elenis (1998)
- O Ious Tou Patera (1996)
- Oi treis Harites (1990)
- Zorba the Greek (1964)
- Liar Wanted (1962)
