= Kliniki Periptosi =

- Genre: Comedy
- Created by: Dominic Minghella
- Written by: Christina Kotzampasi
- Directed by: Andreas Morfonios
- Starring: Giannis Mpezos; Anna Maria Papacharalampous; Tasos Nousias; Evaggelia Moumouri
- Opening theme: We Are Music One Day
- Country of origin: Greece
- Original language: Greek
- No. of seasons: 1
- No. of episodes: 18

Production
- Production locations: Kardamyli, Messenia, Greece
- Camera setup: Multi-camera
- Running time: 42-45 minutes
- Production company: J.K. KARAGIANNIS PRODUCTIONS

Original release
- Network: Mega Channel
- Release: November 18, 2011 – May 25, 2012

Kliniki Periptosi (English: Clinical Case) is a Greek comedy television series that aired in the 2011–2012 season on Mega Channel. The script is based on the British series "Doc Martin" that has been aired since 2004 on ITV.

The script was adapted into Greek by Christina Kotzampasi, while Andreas Morfonios directed it.

The series featured several exterior shots, most of which took place in Kardamyli. The series was among the top 10 highest-rated programs of 2012.

The first episode of the series aired on November 18, 2011, and the last on May 25, 2012. Although the series was renewed for a second season in the spring of 2012, filming and production never began due to financial problems.

== Plot ==
A peculiar great surgeon who a strange game of life brought him from the best clinic in the world to the rural clinic of the picturesque Greek countryside. But what happens when this great doctor is afraid of blood, when this eccentric, almost antisocial, maniac with class doctor decides to settle in a small village? How do the kind-hearted, simple-minded and often naive residents see the famous great doctor?

Markos Staikos experiences small stories of everyday madness in his new life. With love lurking, his fellow villagers often bring him to his limits. At the same time, however, these kind-hearted people also show him another, more relaxed and joyful side of life.

== Cast ==
- Giannis Mpezos as Markos Staikos
- Anna Maria Papacharalampous as Andrianna Bassi
- Tasos Nousias as Panos
- Evaggelia Moumouri as Flora Kouri
- Zoi Rigopoulou as Aristea Staikou
- Giannis Kapetanios as Lampros Fakes
- Eleni Kousta as Mika
- Giorgos Dampassis as Zafeiris
- Markos Lezes as Prodromos Mpourmpesis
- Gianna Papageorgiou as Margarita
- Panagiotis Katsolis as Miltos Fakes
- Evgenia Panagopoulou as Anna
- Kostas Loukas as Tzimis
- Tzeni Stavropoulou as Fani
