= Dolce Vita (1995 TV series) =

Greek television series

- Title screenshot
- Also known as: Ntoltse Vita
- Genre: Comedy
- Created by: Alexandros Rigas; Lefteris Papapetrou
- Written by: Alexandros Rigas; Lefteris Papapetrou
- Directed by: Alexandros Rigas
- Starring: Anna Panayiotopoulou; Thanasis Euthimiadis (Thanasis Efthimiadis); Katiana Balanika; Maria Kavogianni (Maria Kavoyianni); Maria Foka; Pavlos Orkopoulos; Katerina Ziogou
- Theme music composer: Vicente Paiva
- Opening theme: "Mamá, Yo Quiero" by Dámaso Pérez Prado
- Country of origin: Greece
- Original language: Greek
- No. of seasons: 2
- No. of episodes: 70

Production
- Producer: Liana Patera
- Production locations: Athens, Greece
- Running time: 30 min

Original release
- Network: Mega Channel
- Release: October 5, 1995

Ntoltse Vita (Greek: Ντόλτσε Βίτα, Italian: Dolce Vita, English: Sweet Life) is a Greek comedy directed by Alexandros Rigas and co-written with Lefteris Papapetrou, which aired on Mega Channel from 1995-97.

The series focused on the affair between Christina Markatou and her daughter's Boyfriend. The entire structure of the show was based on the way the relationship would remain secret from the family members, the working and social entourage through hilarious situations.

Ntoltse Vita drew high ratings and is one of the most successful series in Greek television history. Reruns of the show are still airing to this day.

== Seasons ==
=== Season 1 ===
Season 1 begins with Christina visiting her daughter, Dorita, in Italy where she studies. On the way home, the bus she is traveling on, stops in a motel near Perugia due to a blizzard. There, Christina meets a young Greek man and they spend the night together without introducing themselves to each other. When Dorita returns to Greece, she announces at the family that she brought her new boyfriend with her. Christina soon realizes that Dorita's boyfriend is the unknown man she met in Perugia, whose name is Antonis. Initially, Christina is against the thought of having an affair with Antonis, but after a while the two of them become lovers, trying desperately to keep it a secret. The only persons who know about the affair are Sasa, Christina's childhood friend, and Manolis, Antonis' best friend. Sasa and Manolis occasionally help the couple from being revealed. At the end of the season Antonis is called to serve his military duty.

=== Season 2 ===
Season 2 continues with the secret relationship between Christina and Antonis, even though Antonis joined the army. Later in the season everyone finds out about the affair except Dorita. Olga, Christina's mother-in-law, in order to keep it still secret from Dorita and wash away the shame Christina brought to the family, tries to persuade her to marry Dorita's godfather. The story continues with Christina leaving the groom at the altar and going away with Antonis. The series ends with the couple separating.

== Cast and characters ==
=== Main characters ===
- Anna Panagiotopoulou as Christina Markatou
- Thanasis Efthimiadis as Antonis Kaloudis, Dorita's boyfriend
- Maria Foka as Olga Markatou, Christina's mother-in-law
- Katiana Balanika as Sasa Papadima, Christina's best friend
- Maria Kavogianni as Aspasia Vardatsikou, the maid
- Katerina Ziogou as Dorita, Christina's daughter
- Pavlos Orkopoulos as Loukas, Christina's work partner
- Galini Tseva as Sofi, Christina's secretary
- Isidoros Stamoulis as Manolis, Antonis' best friend who works in Christina's factory.

=== Secondary Characters ===
Christoforos Papakaliatis as Charis, Dorita's husband.
Keti Konstantinou as Chrisoula Striftompola, Antonis's neighbor

=== Guest stars ===
Eleni Gerasimidou as Fotini Kaloudi, Antonis' mother
Sofia Filippidou as Amalia Pispiriggou, Antonis' captain
Athinodoros Prousalis as Periklis Markatos, Christina's deceased husband
Eleni Kastani as Eleni Yioulbasi
Dimitris Kallivokas as Koulis Delivorias
Stelios Mainas as Pantelis
Iro Mane as Voula

== Christina's Birthday ==
Christina's birthday is a significant day because it was the day her secret affair with Antonis was exposed. Coming to the end of the series, her family and friends decide to make a surprise party for Christina. Thus, they announce to Christina that they are going on a trip. Initially, Christina is sad because no one remembered her birthday, but after a while comes to her mind that she can spend her special day with Antonis. The "gang" is gathered in Sasa's apartment. As the night continues, they decide to go to Christina's house to start the preparations for the party. When they hear sounds coming from upstairs, they start hiding and Dorita remembers at the last moment that she forgot the camera in the car and she goes to get it.

At the same time Antonis is coming down the stairs with Christina in his arms. Then everybody sneak out surprising them, but the real surprise was for them to see Christina and Antonis together. Dorita didn't find out that day, since everyone kept it a secret. The night went on with Sofi and Olga passing out, along with Christina.

== Reception ==
During seasons 1995-96 and 1996–97, Ntoltse Vita was the most popular series in Mega Channel and today is considered to be a classic TV series (or Megalicious Classic) by Mega Channel.

== Reruns ==
Ntoltse Vita ended its run in 1997. The TV station continued airing the series from 1998 until 2001, in 2004, in 2006, in 2008, in 2010, in 2011 and again in 2016 achieving high ratings each time.

== See also ==
- List of programs broadcast by Mega Channel

Media offices
Preceded by Oi Treis Harites	Series starring Anna Panayiotopoulou	Next: Safe Sex
