= Dimitra Papadopoulou =

Cypriot actress, writer and director

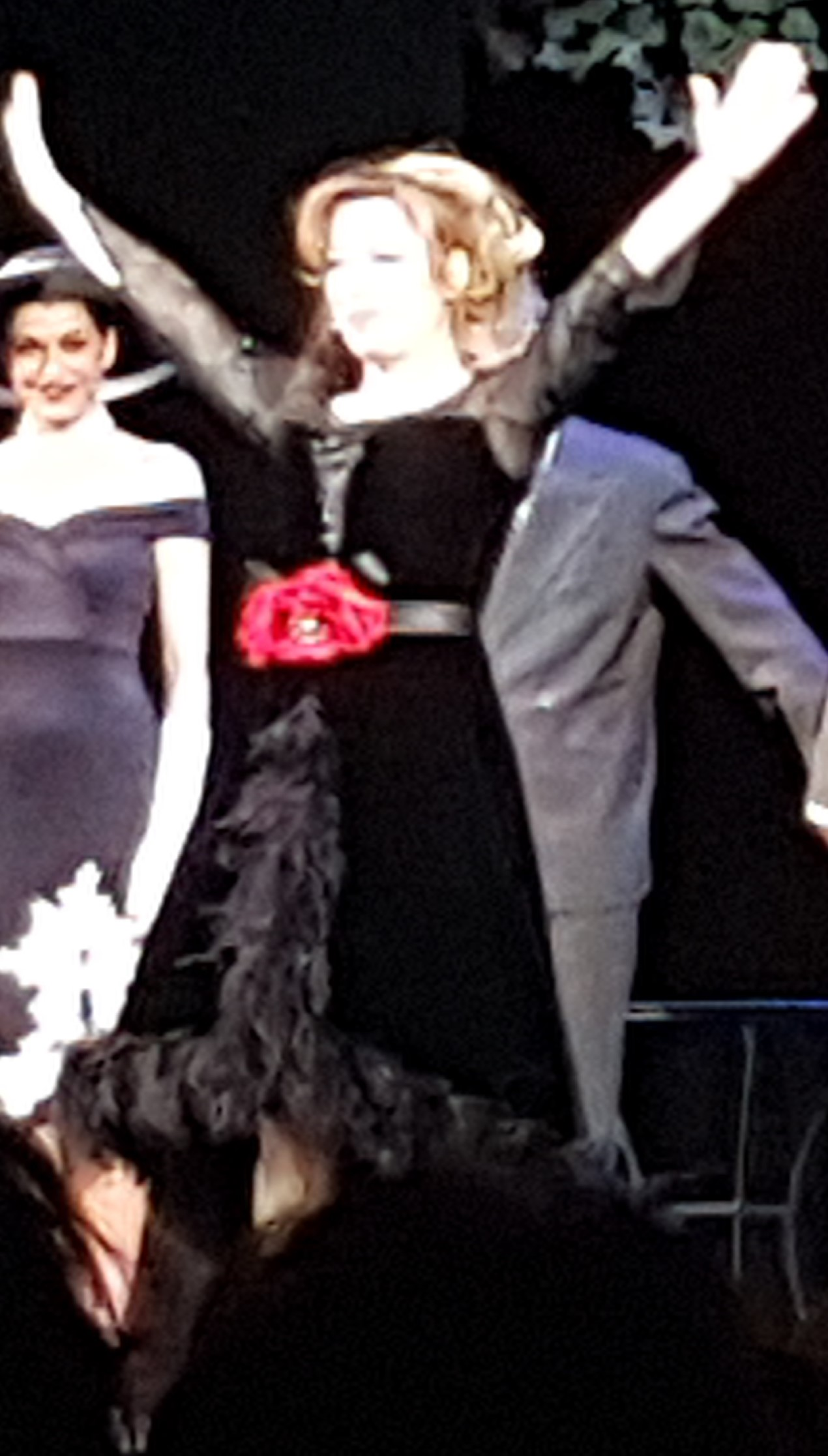
- Dimitra Papadopoulou
- Born: 19 July 1962; Alexandria
- Citizenship: Egypt
- Occupation(s): Actress, writer and director

Dimitra Papadopoulou (Greek: Δήμητρα Παπαδοπούλου; born 19 July 1962) is a Cypriot actress, writer and director.

Papadopoulou gained national recognition for portraying Dimitra on the popular television sitcom Oi Aparadektoi (1991–1993) which she also wrote. She has written many theatrical plays such as O papous exei piesi (Greek: Ο παππους εχει πιεση, English: The grandfather has high blood pressure) and Mana tha pao sto Hollywood (Greek: Μανα θα παω στο Χολυγουντ, English: Mom I'm going to Hollywood). In recent years she has made few appearances on TV as she has focused mostly on theatre.

== Early life ==
Dimitra was born in Alexandria, Egypt, on 19 July 1962. Both of her parents are of Cypriot descent. She lived in Alexandria till the age of seven and later she moved with her parents to Cyprus and then to Greece, first to Thessaloniki and then to Athens.

== Filmography ==
=== Film ===
Title	Year	Role	Notes
Finding Nemo	2003	Dory (voice)	Greek dubbing
Finding Dory	2016	Dory (voice)	Greek dubbing

=== Television ===
Title	Year	Role	Notes
Pinanteous	1987		
Allos Havai allos plironi	1987		
I alepou kai o mpoufos	1987		
To kanali tis Vaggelitsas	1987-1988		
Oi Treis Harites	1991	Lili Gatzola	
Oi Aparadektoi	1991	Dimitra	Also the writer
Tis Ellados ta Paidia	1993	Katerina	episode 3
To geloion tou pragmatos	1994		
Kala ksemperdemata	1996	Roula	Also the writer
Eglimata	1998	Athena	
S'agapo M'agapas	2000-2002	Dimitra	Also the writer
Epta thanasimes petheres	2004	Aspasia	
Ouk an laveis para tou mi ehontos	2010	Pythia (Pythoness)	voice
