= Valavanidis =

Valavanidis (Greek: Βαλαβανίδης) is a Greek surname. Notable people with the surname include:

- Christos Valavanidis (1944–2026), Greek actor
- Giorgos Valavanidis (1974–2024), Greek basketball player
