= Akros oikogeneiakon =

- Genre: Family Comedy
- Written by: Rena Rigga; Panos Amarantidis
- Directed by: Andreas Morfonios
- Starring: Giannis Mpezos; Natalia Tsaliki; Antigoni Glykofridi; Sofia Olympiou; Memos Mpegnis; Christos Spanos; Marousa Stroggioglou
- Opening theme: L.O.V.E. by Nat King Cole
- Country of origin: Greece
- Original language: Greek
- No. of seasons: 2
- No. of episodes: 48

Production
- Executive producer: Giannis Stantzopoulos
- Producer: EPSILON A.E
- Production locations: Ekali, Greece
- Running time: 42-45 minutes

Original release
- Network: ANT1
- Release: October 1, 2001 – January 27, 2003

Akros oikogeneiakon (English: Extremely family) is a family comedy television series that aired on ANT1 during the 2001-2003 seasons. The script was written by Panos Amarantidis and Rena Rigga, while the series was directed by Andreas Morfonios.

Alexandros and Margarita live a quiet family life with their four children, Aris, Εrmis, Αfroditi and little Lila, somewhere in the northern suburbs of Athens. However, Margarita's decision to continue her studies in Law will disrupt the family balance and cause the most unlikely situations.

== Cast ==
- Giannis Mpezos as Alexandros Theotakatos
- Natalia Tsaliki as Margarita Petridou-Theotakatou
- Antigoni Glykofridi as Mpempa Chourmouziadou-Theotakatos
- Sofia Olympiou as Tzoulia Chourmouziadou
- Memos Mpegnis as Aris Theotakatos
- Christos Spanos as Ermis Theotakatos
- Marousa Stroggioglou as Afroditi Theotakatou
- Ilias Zervos as Ilias Chatzidimitrakopoulos
- Faidra Drouka as Chara Petridou
- Athanasia Gkana as Eleftheria
- Thomais Androutsou as Loukia
- Ifigeneia Kaloutsa as Lila Theotakatou (season 1)
- Maria Galeta as Lila Theotakatou (season 1)
