= Worlds Apart (2015 film) =

- Official Poster of the film.
- Directed by: Christoforos Papakaliatis
- Starring: J. K. Simmons; Christoforos Papakaliatis; Andrea Osvárt; Maria Kavoyianni; Minas Hatzisavvas; Tawfeek Barhom; Niki Vakali
- Release date: 17 December 2015
- Running time: 113 minutes
- Country: Greece
- Languages: Greek; English
- Box office: $5.1 million

Worlds Apart is a 2015 Greek drama film directed by Christoforos Papakaliatis. It consists of three separate narratives, each following a love story between a foreigner and a Greek. Each story represents a different generation falling in love during a time of socioeconomic turmoil that dominates Southern Europe as a whole, only to connect as a single story in the end.

== Cast ==
- J. K. Simmons as Sebastian
- Christoforos Papakaliatis as Giorgos
- Andrea Osvárt as Elise
- Maria Kavoyianni as Maria
- Minas Hatzisavvas as Antonis
- Tawfeek Barhom as Farris
- Niki Vakali as Daphne
- Odysseas Papaspiliopoulos as Odysseas
- Nikos Chatzopoulos as Ilias
- Matthaios Korovesis as Anthony, Giorgos' son

== Reception ==
Worlds Apart grossed $4.8 million at the Greek box office, making it the highest grossing 2015 film in Greece.

On Rotten Tomatoes the film has an approval rating of 67% based on 9 reviews. On Metacritic, it has a score of 61 based on 5 critics, indicating "generally favourable reviews".

Frank Scheck of The Hollywood Reporter wrote: "Worlds Apart doesn’t manage to transcend the forced and familiar-feeling aspects of its multipart narrative, but it does offer an evocative portrait of its troubled milieu, and one of its segments, at least, has genuine emotional resonance." Owen Gleiberman of Variety wrote: "It isn't bad, but it’s kind of a trifle. Though it treats its themes with reasonable honesty, it can't help but come off as a bit diagrammed."
