= Christoforos Papakaliatis =

Greek actor, film director and screenwriter

- Born: 23 December 1975 (age 50); Heraklion, Greece
- Occupations: Actor, director, screenwriter
- Years active: 1993–present

Christoforos Papakaliatis (Note: Greek: Χριστόφορος Παπακαλιάτης, Greek pronunciation: [xriˈstoforos papakaˈʎatis]) (born 23 December 1975) is a Greek actor, director and screenwriter.

== Early life ==
Christoforos Papakaliatis was born in Heraklion on 23 December 1975, the son of Villy Malamis and Emmanuel Papakaliatis. His father is Cretan Greek and his mother is Greek from South Africa.

== Career ==
=== Television ===
Papakaliatis began his career at the age of 16, playing numerous roles on successful TV shows broadcast on Mega, Greece's largest TV network at that time. At the age of 23, he began writing his own TV scripts. His first script Our Life Is a Path (Greek: Η ζωή μας μια βόλτα) aired on Mega and was well-received by critics and the public. The following year, he wrote and starred in the TV series Take Care of Me (Greek: Να με προσεχείς) and then wrote and starred in the TV movie Three Wishes.

Papakaliatis' TV drama Close Your Eyes (Κλείσε τα μάτια) was one of the highest rated TV series in Greece. He wrote and starred in the series, and also directed most of the second and third season episodes. The series featured a kiss between two men, which sparked a debate in Greece as it was the first time two male characters had kissed on television. Papakaliatis received a fine by the Greek National Council for Radio and Television, but this was later withdrawn by the Greek Council of State.

Maestro, a series written by and starring Papakaliatis, was broadcast on Mega in 2022. Later that year, Netflix bought the rights to stream the series worldwide, making it the first Greek series to be picked up by Netflix.

=== Film ===
In 2006 Papakaliatis wrote, directed, and starred in the drama-thriller series Two Days Only (Δυο μέρες μόνο) and in 2009 he wrote, directed and starred in the TV series 4 (Τέσσερις). It was the same year that he got accepted as a member of the International Academy of Television Arts and Sciences (EMMY International). In 2012, he starred next to Catherine Deneuve and Sebastian Koch in the feature film God Loves Caviar directed by Iannis Smaragdis. What If... (Greek: Αν) (2012) was his first feature film. He wrote and directed the film, and played the leading role of Demetris. The movie was a box office success in Greece for the 2012-2013 season, remaining in theaters for more than 4 months and making a $4.5M box office. What If was screened at numerous film festivals around the world, but never got international distribution. In 2013, it was qualified to run for a Golden Globe nomination as a foreign movie but never made it to the finals. In 2017, its script was sold in Turkey and a Turkish adaptation will be soon shot in Istanbul.

In 2015, his second feature film Worlds Apart starring Academy Award winner J.K. Simmons had its official theatrical release in Greece. This love story was set in Athens between foreigners and Greeks and was played out against the tense backdrop of the combined incoming immigration wave and devastating economic crisis that Europe and especially Greece were then facing. The movie made a $5M box-office and was the second highest grossing film in the 2010s in Greece, notably surpassing the performance of blockbusters like Star Wars: The Force Awakens and James Bond film Skyfall.

Worlds Apart had international distribution and was released in 25 countries. In January 2017, the movie was released theatrically in the US by Cinema Libre Studio, receiving positive reviews from the LA Times and various other publications. In 2017 the movie was also released theatrically in Switzerland and Austria by Trigon Films.

=== Theatre ===
- In 1996-1998 he played his first leading role in Les Parents Terribles written by Jean Cocteau.
- In 1999-2000 he played the leading role in The Thief written by Marie Pacome.
- In 2001 he played in the theatrical adaptation of the film Shallow Grave by John Golf.
- In 2007 he played "Human Voices" a puzzle of monologues written by Jean Cocteau.
- In 2011-2012 he played Wolfgang Amadeus Mozart in the well-known theatrical play Amadeus by Peter Shaffer. Due to its box office success, the play had a second theatrical season.

== Filmography ==
=== Television ===
Year	Title	Role(s)	Notes	Ref.
1992	The Unacceptables	videoclub employee	Episode: "Sex, porn and videomovies"	
1992-1993	The Guardians of Achaea	Veniamin	Main role (34 episodes)	
1992-1993	Women		10 episodes	
1992-1993	Kostis Palamas	Christakis Palamas	6 episodes	
1992-2001	Ten Little Mitsoi	Christopher	Main role (32 episodes)	
1993-1994	Anastasia	Spyros	13 episodes	
1994	Anatomy of a crime	Alkis	Episode: "Closed circuit"	
1994	Anatomy of a crime		Episode: "Poveri fiori"	
1994	Decide!		Episode: "I'm your mirror"	
1996-1997	Dolce Vita	Charis	12 episodes	
1996-1997	Colored Sun	Alexandros	Main role (18 episodes)	
1998-1999	A Touch of soul	Rigas	Main role (30 episodes)	
1999-2000	All our life was a walk	Michalis Ploumis	Lead role (24 episodes); also writer	
2000-2001	Take care of me	Alexandros	Lead role (24 episodes); also writer	
2003-2004	Close your eyes	Philippos Rallis	Lead role (31 episodes); also writer and director	
2005-2006	Two days left	Aris Vrettos	Lead role (18 episodes); also writer and director	
2009-2010	4	Petros Xenopoulos	Lead role (26 episodes); also writer and director	
2019	One World	Himself (host)	Documentary; also writer and director	
2022-2024	Maestro in Blue	Orestis Emmanouel	Lead role (19 episodes); also writer and director	

=== Film ===
Year	Title	Role	Notes	Ref.
1997	Hercules (1997 film)	Hercules	voice role in greek	
2002	Three Wishes	Lefteris	TV movie; also writer	
2012	God Loves Caviar	Grigori Potemkin		
2012	What If...	Dimitris	also writer and director	
2015	Worlds Apart	Giorgos	also writer, director and producer	
2017	The Lego Batman Movie	Batman	voice role	

== Personal life ==
Papakaliatis currently resides between Los Angeles and Greece.
