= Melpo Kosti =

Greek actress

Melpo Kosti (Greek: Μέλπω Κωστή; Athens, 26 November 1964) is a Greek television and soap opera actress, currently appearing on Erotas. She is best known for her roles in such TV series as Synora Agapis and Pathos.

== Selected filmography ==
- Erotas (2005) TV Series .... Elena Hatzigianni (2007–present)
- Mi mou les adio (2004) TV Series .... Filippos' mother (2004–2006)
- Kaneis de leei s' agapo (2004) TV Series .... Katerina
- Epta thanasimes petheres (TV series) (1 episode)
- Mistika kai lathi (2003) TV Series
- Peri anemon kai ydaton (2000) TV Series .... Mairi
- Synora agapis (1999) TV Series
- Pathos (1993) TV Series .... Eva
- Tis Ellados ta paidia (1993) TV Series (unknown episodes)
