= Antinoos Albanis =

Greek actor

Antinoos Albanis (born 22 May 1983) is a Greek actor.

== Biography ==
Born on 22 May 1983 in Athens and raised in Chalkida, he is a graduate of the drama school Karolos Koun (2001–04). He achieved his television debut as an actor on Alpha TV.

His voice was featured in many ads on TV and in many compilations in cinema. More recently he was cast in the film Christmas Tango, an adaptation of a book by Yannis Drakoularakos, in which he plays a gay soldier and dance instructor named Lazarou.

== Filmography ==
=== Film ===
Year	Title	Role	Notes
2009	The Island	Stratos	Film debut
2009	Attempt		short film
2010	45m²	Haris	
2010	Nobody	Goran	
2010	genius	Hull / Tahiti	greek voice role
2010	How to Train Your Dragon	Myxarchos	greek voice role
2011	Christmas Tango	Lazaros Lazarou	
2011	Rio 1		greek voice role
2011	The Smurfs	Stumble	greek voice role
2012	The five legends	Ice Jack	greek voice role
2013	The Smurfs 2	Stumble	greek voice role
2013	Turbo		greek voice role
2013	Vigilantes	brother #2	
2019	Immagination	Fotini's lawyer	
2024	I've something to tell you	Stavros Tzitzas	

=== Television ===
Year	Title	Role	Notes
2005-2006	I missed you	Stefanos Efthimiou	Main role, 20 episodes
2006	Quicksand	Dimitris	6 episodes
2006	Two Days Only	Antinoos	8 episodes
2007-2008	Loafing and Camouflage: Th Series	Agis Dousis Evgenikos	Main role, 15 episodes
2008	True Loves	Kostas	Episode: "The train"
2008-2009	Bad Guys	Spike	Lead role, 20 episodes
2009	Litsa.com	Alexis	Lead role, 9 episodes
2010	The third law	rapist	Episode: "The cage"
2010	The third law	Miltos	Episode: "Hidden"
2011	The Island	Nektarios Paterakis	1 episode
2015	10th command	Nikos	Episode: "Anger"
2015	10th command	Prodromos Gunpowder	Episode: "Gunpowder"
2018	Don't kill	doctor	Episode: "Shadows"
2018	Don't kill	Thanos	Episode: "Lucky"
2018-2019	The Prince of Fire	Miltos Komninos	Lead role, 90 episodes
2020-2021	The Sun	Philippos Venekidis	Lead role, 179 episodes
2022	30's Generation	Giorgos Sarantaris	Episode: "Giorgos Sarantaris"
2022-2023	The Other Me: Nemesis	Kostas Platsis	8 episodes
2022-2024	Maestro in Blue	Michalis	Main role, 18 episodes
2024	Blackboards	Aris Pavlidis	Lead role, 10 episodes
2025	Mother Undercover	Panos Stefanidis	Lead role, 30 episodes
