= Iliopoulos =

Iliopoulos (Greek: Ηλιόπουλος) is a Greek surname. Notable people with the surname include:

- Dinos Iliopoulos (1915–2001), actor and film director
- Giannis Iliopoulos (born 1979), basketball player
- John Iliopoulos (born 1940), theoretical physicist
- Marios Iliopoulos (born 1969), heavy metal guitarist
- Vasileios Iliopoulos (born 1988), Greek tennis player
