= Maestro in Blue =

Greek drama television series

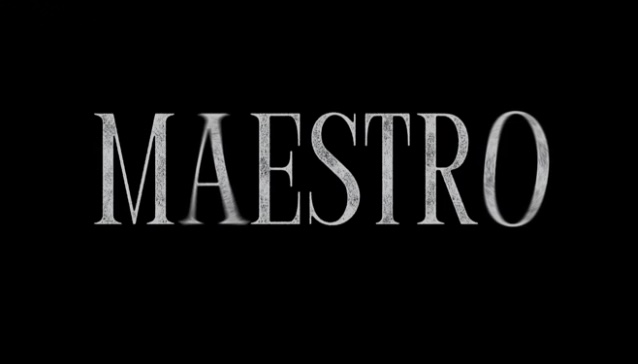
- Genre: Drama; Crime
- Created by: Christoforos Papakaliatis
- Written by: Christopher Papakaliatis
- Directed by: Christopher Papakaliatis Akis Polizos
- Starring: Christopher Papakaliatis; Klelia Andriolatou
- Country of origin: Greece
- Original language: Greek
- No. of seasons: 3
- No. of episodes: 19

Production
- Executive producer: Stelios Cotionis
- Producer: Giorgos Moshovitis
- Camera setup: Single-camera
- Production company: Foss Productions

Original release
- Network: Mega Channel
- Release: 13 October 2022

Maestro in Blue (also known as Maestro in Greece) is a Greek drama television series airing on Mega Channel in Greece and through Netflix worldwide. The series consists of three seasons with a total of 19 episodes.

== Plot ==
Orestis, a troubled musician, travels to the Greek island of Paxos to direct a revival of the local music festival. There he meets Klelia, an ambitious 19-year-old woman who wants to study music in Athens. A murder takes place which will change the plans.

== Cast ==
=== Main characters ===
- Christoforos Papakaliatis (Orestis): A musician who accepts the invitation to organize a music festival on the small Ionian island and moves there immediately after the lockdown period.
- Klelia Andriolatou (Klelia): Klelia is 19 years old and is preparing to take exams at the Music School. She grew up in Paxos and has a passion for piano and music. She is quite different from other children her age, as she does not want to lose her romance. Her acquaintance with Orestis awakens her first true love.
- Orestis Chalkias (Antonis): Klelia's younger brother. Antonis, like his sister, is different from their peers and is at odds with his parents. For him the festival and the arrival of Orestis is an escape from his problems.
- Marisha Triantafyllidou (Sophia): The mother of Klelia and Antonis and the wife of Fanis.
- Fanis Mouratidis (Fanis): Husband of Sophia and father of Klelia and Antonis. He is a candidate for mayor and is the one who brought Orestis to the island. Fanis hides secrets that no one knows, except for Sofia.
- Haris Alexiou (Haris): Sophia's mother. She is the calm power of the house and the one who knows everything about the whole family. She is at odds with her daughter, Sophia, and has a weakness for her grandchildren. Haris had a talent for singing, but she never got to sing. She stayed on the island leaving her dreams behind and wants Klelia not to make the same mistake.
- Yannis Tsortekis (Charalampos): Husband of Maria and father of Spyros. When he drinks he becomes violent and abusive towards his wife and son. He doesn't like music and doesn't want his son and his wife to have anything to do with the festival or Orestis.
- Maria Kavoyianni (Maria): She runs a tavern on the island and is the wife of Charalampos and mother of Spyros. She is a woman who is afraid to tell society how much she is suffering, as she cannot escape from her abusive husband. The arrival of Orestis and her involvement in the festival will give her strength and another perspective on things.
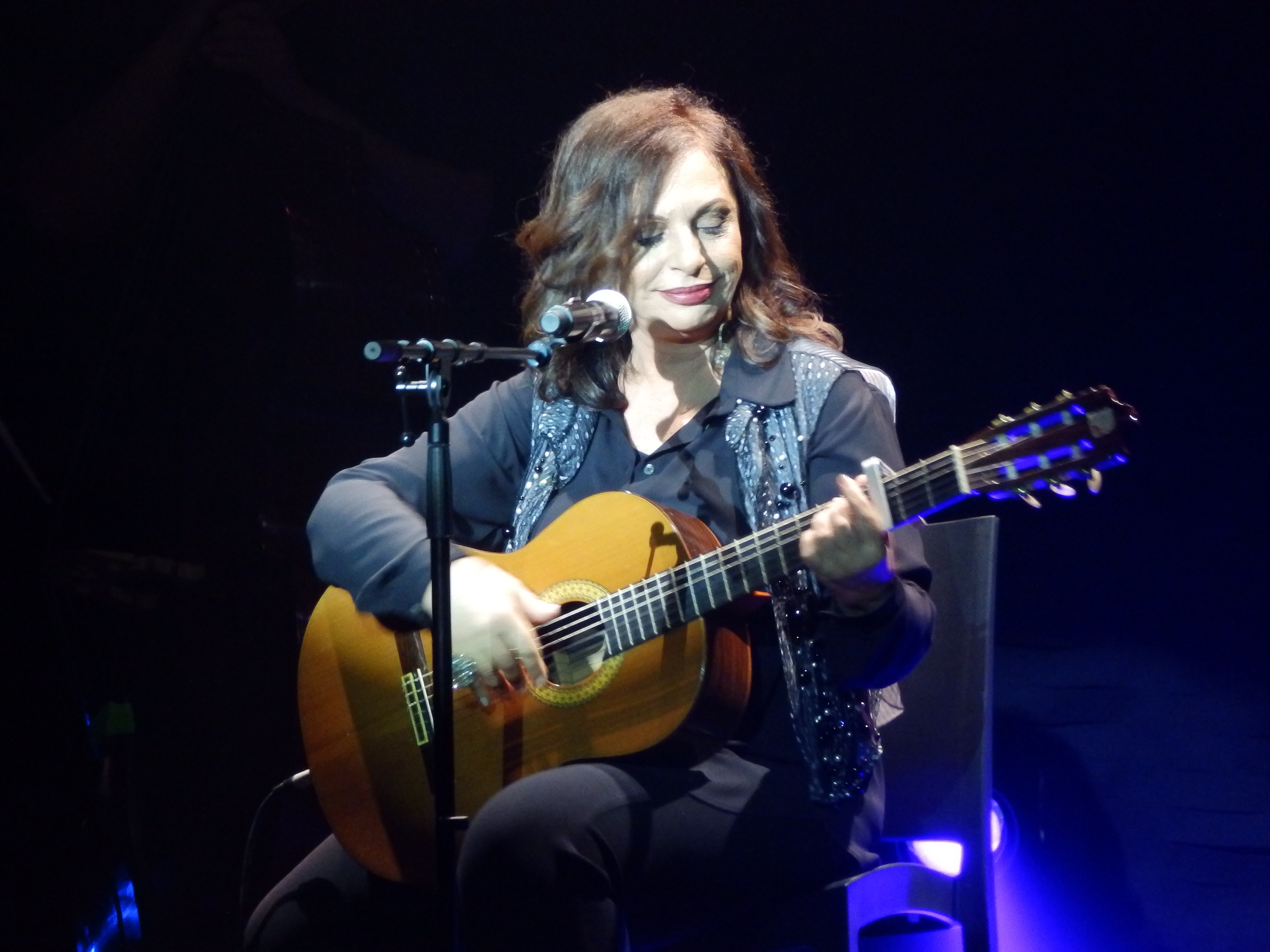
  Greek singer and actress Haris Alexiou, who portrayed Sophia's mother in the series
- Yiorgos Benos (Spyros): Son of Maria and Charalambos. He is oppressed and trapped in the model of the "tough" young man in the small society of the island.
- Antinoos Albanis (Michalis): The island doctor. The reason he never left the island was his love for Sophia. But their relationship ended ingloriously, because of her marriage, and now they try to be friends.
- Dimitris Kitsos (Thanos): A medical student. Seemingly he is a good boy and Fanis considers him an ideal partner for his daughter. He is in love with Klelia, but is unaware that she is not in love with him.
- Stefania Goulioti (Alexandra): Orestis' wife.
- Manfredi Saavedra plays Giovanni, the Italian mafia boss whose family has a drug trafficking and other businesses with Albanians using Paxos as crossroads of drugs en route between Italy and Albania.

== Episodes ==
Season	Episodes	Originally released	
Season	Episodes	Season premiere	Season finale
1	9	13 October 2022	15 December 2022
2	6	16 May 2024	20 June 2024
3	4	2 December 2024	5 December 2024
4	6	18 December 2026	23 December 2026

=== Season 1 ===
Episode	Title	Description	Duration	Original release date
1	"Clair De Lune"	Orestis is a musician and arrives at Paxos to organize the island's music festival. There he will meet the whole small society. His meeting with young Klelia will be the occasion, to find himself involved in extreme situations.	51m	13 October 2022
2	"Denial" (Άρνηση)	Orestis discovers that the life of the island's inhabitants is not what it seems. He develops a personal relationship with them and discovers dark secrets about each one. He takes a stand against the violence that Maria and Spyros receive.	51m	20 October 2022
3	"Prayer" (Προσευχή)	Preparations for the music festival are progressing. The illegal activities of Fanis and Charalambos are revealed to their children and conflict is inevitable. Haris parallels the love of Klelia and Orestis with her own lost love.	59m	3 November 2022
4	"The Great Chimera" (Μεγάλη Χίμαιρα)	The domestic violence from Charalambos to Maria will trigger new developments on the island. Orestis and Klelia find themselves in Corfu for a while, and there they get even closer. Orestis doesn't know how to manage his love for her.	55m	10 November 2022
5	"The Family" (La famiglia)	Fanis prepares for his election campaign, continues the illegal activities with Charalambos and tries to keep his family together. He learns about Orestis's relationship with Klelia and invites him to the house in order to discover the truth.	54m	17 November 2022
6	"Musical Chairs" (Μουσικές καρέκλες)	Alexandra arrives in the small island, and her relationship with Orestis is divulged. Orestis feels uncomfortable and Klelia is broken by Alexandra's appearance. However, things are different and Orestis's past is revealed.	60m	24 November 2022
7	"An Uninstructed Sinks" (Ένας απαίδευτος… βουλιάζει)	Spyros and Antonis visit Athens secretly. Orestis cannot express his feelings to Klelia while Alexandra makes things worse.	55m	1 December 2022
8	"Autoimmune" (Αυτοάνοσα)	Alexandra's pregnancy leads to an impasse for Orestis who has now accepted his love for Klelia. Charalambos removes Maria and Spyros from the festival. Maria discovers something about her husband that pushes her to her limits.	55m	8 December 2022
9	"Love Me Do" (Να μ’αγαπάς)	The music festival begins. The whole island is flooded with music. At the same time, the developments in the lives of the heroes are rapid and the murder of Charalambos is decisive.	73m	15 December 2022

=== Season 2 ===
Episode	Title	Description	Duration	Original release date
1	"Mother" (Μητέρα)		1h 12m	16 May 2024
2	"Jungle" (Ζούγκλα)		1h 6m	23 May 2024
3	"Post-trauma" (Metatravma)		1h 10m	30 May 2024
4	"Toxic"		58m	6 June 2024
5	"Therapy" (Therapia)		1h 6m	13 June 2024
6	"Legacy Contact" (Επαφή κληρονομιάς)		1h 5m	20 June 2024

=== Season 3 ===
Episode	Title	Description	Duration	Original release date
1	"Preludes" (Άπιστος)		1h 6m	2 December 2024
2	"Social"		1h 2m	3 December 2024
3	"Second Chance" (Δεύτερη ευκαιρία)		1h 6m	4 December 2024
4	"A Fine Line" (Μια λεπτή γραμμή)		1h 19m	5 December 2024

== Production ==
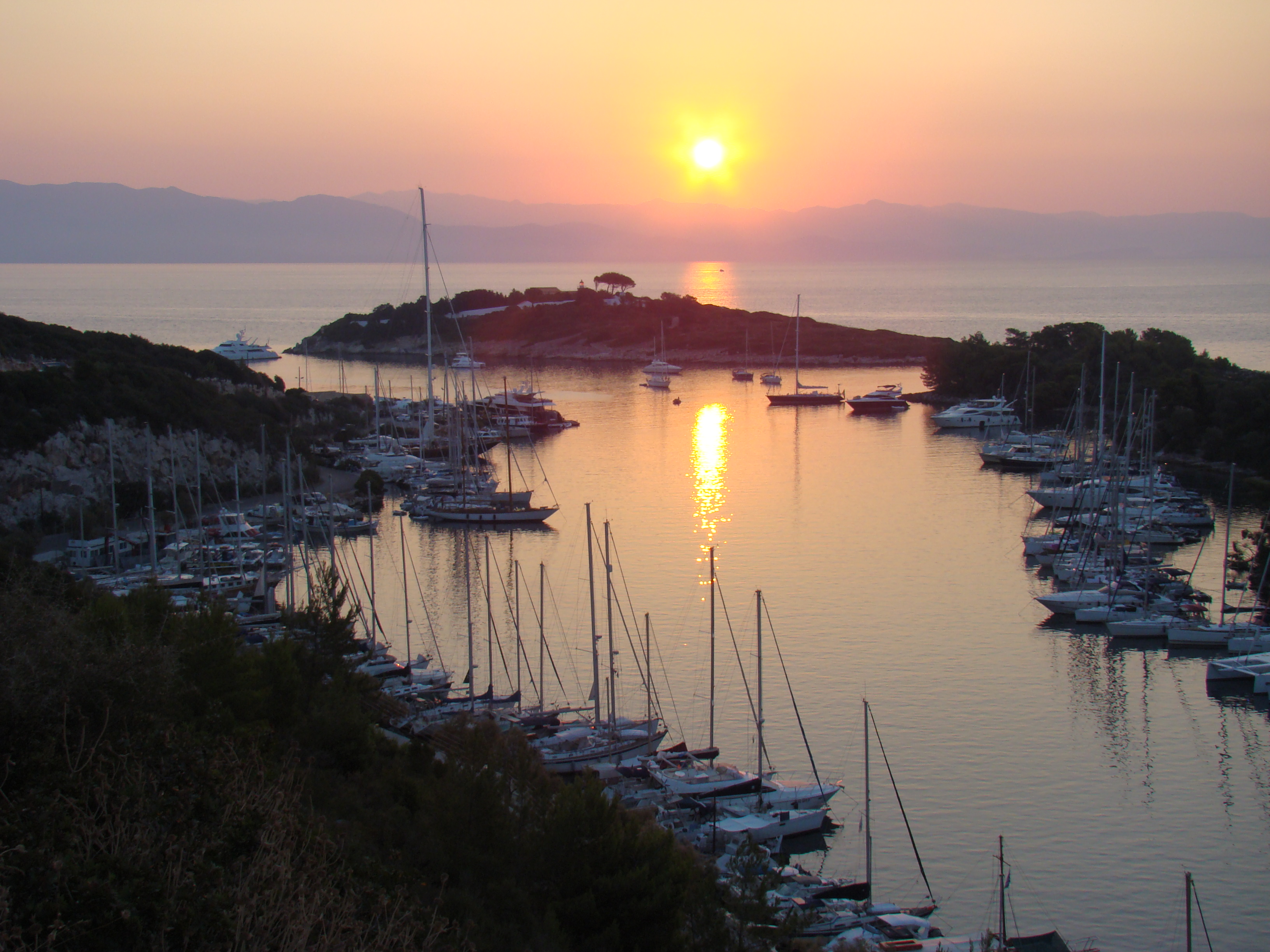
The island of Paxos where most of the filming took place.

The series was written by Christoforos Papakaliatis and directed by him together with Akis Polizos. Casting for the series began in 2020 in Athens, while the overall production of the series lasted two years. Filming began in July 2021 and ended in February 2022, taking place in Paxos, Corfu and Athens. The filming of the second season began in the spring of 2023.

The series was the second most expensive series per episode on the Mega Channel, with a budget of eligible expenses of €2,318,570, while each episode of the series cost €257,618. A few days before the official premiere of the series, a special screening of the first episode was organized for actors, contributors and journalists at the Benaki Museum.

== Release ==
The series premiered on Greek television from Mega Channel under the title Maestro on 13 October 2022, and the first season ended on 15 December with nine episodes. In November, Papakaliatis announced that the series had been renewed for a second season.

On 11 November 2022, the global subscription platform Netflix acquired the rights to the series. It then became available on the platform on 17 March 2023 under the title Maestro in Blue, making it the first Greek television series to screen on the platform.

== Reception ==
Reviewing the series for the Greek audience Lifo's Alexandros Diakosavvas wrote "Maestro achieves, already from its first 45 minutes, the sense of discomfort of the closed place, of the small Greek society, the impossibility of escape that foreshadows a violent outbreak." Vasiliki Geronikou of Athinorama mentions that "the script simultaneously approaches many difficult themes (love with a large age difference, homophobia, domestic violence, etc.), risking not finding the space they need to develop equally properly and in depth." Klelia Fatourou reviewing for Jenny.gr praised the aesthetics, the photography and the direction but called the series outdated, criticizing the age gap between the leads and the «pick me» mentality of the leading female character.

Following its release to Netflix on 17 March 2023, the show entered the global top 10 most-watched shows list.
