= Crying... Silicon Tears =

2001 film by Michalis Reppas

Crying Silicon Tears
- Directed by: Thanasis Papathanasiou; Michalis Reppas
- Written by: Thanasis Papathanasiou; Michalis Reppas
- Produced by: Helena Hatzialexandrou
- Cinematography: Kostas Gkikas
- Edited by: Ioanna Speliopoulos
- Music by: Afrodite Manou
- Distributed by: Warner Roadshow Distributrors
- Release date: 26 October 2001 (Greece)
- Running time: 101 minutes
- Country: Greece
- Language: Greek
- Budget: €1,32 million

Crying Silicon Tears (Orig. Το κλάμα βγήκε απ' τον παράδεισο / To kláma vgíke ap' ton parádiso) is a 2001 Greek language film directed by Thanasis Papathanasiou and Michalis Reppas.

== Plot ==
The movie is divided into three timelines, the 1960s, the World War II period, and the bucolic period (in order from newest to oldest). In the 1960s, the rich Della Franca family start a fight with the poor Bisbikis family over a man who romances women from both families. The Della Francas manage to put the Bisbikis's mother, Lavrentia, out of business, which triggers the World War II flashback, in which Lavrentia worked with the Greek Resistance. In that period, another event triggers the bucolic period in the form of Lavrentia talking about her ancestors, a man and a woman who lived in a small village in the countryside. No clear main plot exists in any period, as the film mainly revolves around Lavrentia's history and the tragic events that stained her life. At the end of the film, the Bisbikises are revealed to be blood-related to the Della Francas, and they all live happily ever after.

Although the film features mostly tragic events, they are presented in a way that pays tribute to but also satirizes old Greek dramas, war movies, and bucolic-style films.

== Cast ==
- Anna Panayiotopoulou as Lavrentia Bisbiki
- Mirka Papakonstantinou as Tzella Della Franca
- Mina Adamaki as Billio
- Mimis Chrisomalis as Parnassos
- Joys Evidi as Jenny Della Franca
- Sofia Filippidou as Sirmo
- Tasos Halkias as Mr. Baras
- Antonis Kafetzopoulos as contact
- Trifon Karatzas as Mr. Della Franca
- Krateros Katsoulis as doctor
- Maria Kavoyianni as Martha
- Vladimiros Kiriakidis as German soldier 1
- Kostas Koklas as German soldier 2
- Ketty Konstadinou as Jenny's friend
- Anna Kyriakou as Mrs. Baras
- Renia Louizidou as party guest 1
- Nena Menti as party guest 2
- Yorgos Partsalakis as general of the Greek army
- Michalis Reppas as Yiakoumis
- Hristos Simardanis as Denis
- Thodoros Siriotis as judge
- Mary Stavrakeli as Zabeta
- Christos Valavanidis as Heinrich Von Snitchell
- Yannis Zouganelis as Kavouras
