= Oi Aparadektoi =

- title screenshot
- Οι Απαράδεκτοι
- Genre: Comedy
- Written by: Dimitra Papadopoulou
- Directed by: Dimitris Papakonstantis
- Starring: Dimitra Papadopoulou; Spyros Papadopoulos; Yannis Bezos; Vlassis Bonatsos
- Theme music composer: Nikko Patrelakis
- Country of origin: Greece
- Original language: Greek
- No. of seasons: 2
- No. of episodes: 48

Production
- Producer: Froso Ralli
- Production locations: Athens, Greece
- Running time: 25 min
- Production company: Studio ATA

Original release
- Network: Mega Channel

Oi Aparadektoi (Greek: Οι Απαράδεκτοι, English: The Unacceptables) is a comedy television series broadcast by Mega Channel from September 1991 to January 1993. The series is considered one of the most successful on Greek television, representative of the daily life of the Athenians in the early 1990s.

== Premise ==
The show is about the lives of four friends, the eponymous "Aparadektoi": Spyros (Spyros Papadopoulos), Dimitra (Dimitra Papadopoulou, who is also the script writer), Yannis (Yannis Bezos) and Vlassis (Vlassis Bonatsos). Spyros and Dimitra have been married for five years, while Yannis and Vlassis are roommates and best friends, despite the fact that the former is a homosexual and the latter a shameless womanizer. All four live on the same floor of an apartment building in Lycabettus, Athens, Greece, in two apartments that share the same terrace. The cast is rounded out by Renia (Renia Louizidou), Vlassis' girlfriend, and Mr. Vassilis (Vassilis Halakatevakis), the landlord.

The show's episodes are self-contained - even if hell may have broken loose by the end of an episode (e.g. Dimitra declaring that she will divorce Spyros), the next episode will find everything back to normal. The show is also notable for the unconventional friendship between the characters; even though they describe themselves as friends, the four frequently quarrel, casually badmouth and plot against each other; Spyros and Vlassis often plan to cheat on Dimitra and Renia and vice versa; and so on.

Spyros Papadopoulos and Yannis Bezos are widely considered to be among the finest Greek actors of their generation, Dimitra Papadopoulou is one of the most successful female comedians and script writers, and the intro theme was composed/sampled by renowned electronica musician Nikko Patrelakis. Also, Vlassis Bonatsos was a highly successful comedian, singer and TV personality, who died a few years after the show, in 2004.

In 2009, MEGA Channel asked Dimitra Papadopoulou to write the script for a new season of episodes, however she rejected the proposal due to the death of the fourth actor (Vlassis). As she explained later, she was shattered by the death of Vlassis Bonatsos, and being loyal to her friend's memory she would never replace his role with another actor.

== Characters ==
=== Spyros ===
Spyros is an advertising producer. Despite a glorious - according to him - past in the Communist Party of Greece and his participation in the Athens Polytechnic uprising against the Greek military junta of 1967-1974 from November 14 to November 17, 1973, Spyros today is no better than the capitalists he views with disdain. He is obsessed with making and saving money and thus absorbed in his work, while maintaining the theoretical views of a communist. He is short tempered and supposedly the most level headed of the quartet, which makes him often exclaim his catchphrase "Ti egine re paidia?" (approx. "What on earth happened, you guys?") while looking at the camera in perplexed demeanour when crazy situations arise.

=== Dimitra ===
Dimitra is Spyros' disgruntled wife. Spyros' devotion to his job leave her feeling neglected, leading her in numerous fruitless attempts to arouse her husband's interest in her. She is not as refined as Spyros thinks himself to be, which is often a cause of friction between them. She is insanely jealous of Spyros, often with good reason and she has threatened to divorce him many times during the show's run.

=== Yannis ===
Yannis is a fashion designer. He is also a homosexual, a fact that all his friends know and accept. He has a neurotic personality and elitist attitude. This is because he knows he is often the shrewdest one in the gang, but also because being a homosexual in the early 1990s Greece made forming and having an according relationship tricky, a source of much stress for Yannis. His only surviving family, his Aunt Virginia, is in the dark about her nephew's sexuality.

=== Vlassis ===
Vlassis works as the main actor in Spyros' commercials. He is also Yannis' best friend and roommate ever since one of his girlfriends broke up with him. Vlassis is laid back and easy going - he enjoys the earthly pleasures of life, like food, drink and especially women.

=== Renia ===
Renia works as an advertising model and secretary in Spyros' firm. She is also Vlassis' girlfriend, a pretty shaky term considering Vlassis' flirtatious nature. Renia is young and modern and often introduces new notions for the others to try. Yannis views Renia with disdain, nicknaming her To astropeleki ("The thunderbolt") due to her unpredictably energetic attitude and inane comments.

=== Mr. Vassilis ===
Mr. Vassilis is the landlord of the apartments Spyros, Dimitra, Yannis and Vlassis live in. He tries to have friendly relationships with his tenants but something always puts a crimp in these attempts, such as him demanding overdue rent or being decidedly uncool. He is often the harbinger of bad news to the rest of the gang.

== Reruns ==
After the show ended its run in January 1993, Mega Channel reran it a multitude of times over the next few years, together with other much-loved series, like Oi Treis Harites. The show ended up being reran in the 1990s more times than any other on Greek television (more than 12 reruns within 5 years). Eventually, a tired television audience and sarcastic TV magazine reviews forced the show off the air after the summer of 1997.

In 2004, Mega Channel reran a small number of episodes as part of its 15-year anniversary. After 7 years of absence, this revisit was welcomed by the public. Mega Channel then started rerunning Oi Aparadektoi again on a weekly basis in a prime time slot (Friday 21:00) for a few months.
