= Famagusta (TV series) =

2024 Greek TV series

- Genre: Drama; Social
- Created by: Vana Dimitriou; Andreas Georgiou
- Written by: Vana Dimitriou
- Directed by: Andreas Georgiou
- Starring: Giannis Mpezos; Koralia Karanti; Christos Loulis; Andreas Georgiou; Aimilia Ypsilanti
- Theme music composer: Christos Stylianou
- Opening theme: Den Ksechno by Maria Farantouri
- Countries of origin: Greece; Cyprus
- Original language: Greek
- No. of seasons: 3
- No. of episodes: 24

Production
- Executive producer: Koulis Nikolaou
- Producers: G&N MAKE IT PRODUCTIONS LTD
- Production locations: Greece; Cyprus; United Kingdom
- Running time: 70-80 minutes
- Production companies: ALTER EGO; MASS MEDIA S.A; MEGA

Original release
- Network: Mega Channel
- Release: January 21 – December 22, 2024

Famagusta is a Greek weekly drama television series, produced in 2023–2024, created by Antreas Georgiou and Vana Dimitriou. "Famagusta" is the Frankish name for Ammochostos, the capital of the homonymous province of Cyprus, meaning "buried in the sand" and occurring since the 4th century AD.

The series presents the Greek Cypriot Sekeris family, living in free Cyprus, originally from the walled city of Famagusta. The family lives with the weight of the loss of their firstborn son when, in August 1974, during the second phase of the Turkish invasion of the island ("Attila 2"), the infant was snatched from his mother's arms and since then his fate has been unknown, as have 1,508 other Missing Persons, Greek Cypriots and Greeks.

The series' creators, on the occasion of the 50th anniversary of the Turkish invasion and occupation of Cyprus, brought to the small screen interpretations of the living narratives of survivors, with the aim of preserving the memory and the struggle for the fate of the Missing Persons. The series caused reactions on the Turkish and Turkish Cypriot sides for the decision of the global subscription platform Netflix to screen it from September 20, 2024, in Greece and throughout Cyprus.

== Plot ==
A young couple (she is 17 and he is 19) lose their three-month-old baby on the day of the invasion. They are forced to abandon their home, Famagusta, losing all hope of finding their baby. An infant managed to survive in the nightmarish setting of the war and today he is a fifty-year-old man who we watch live his own life in London, alongside that of his family, in Cyprus, who are unaware of his fate. The return of the missing son to his homeland, on the occasion of a documentary for an international platform, is expected to prove fatal for both his life and the lives of all the heroes of the series.

== Cast ==
- Giannis Mpezos as Andreas Sekeris
- Andreas Chrysanthou as Andreas Sekeris (younger)
- Koralia Karanti as Christina Sekeri
- Georgia Kouvaraki as Christina Sekeri (younger)
- Christos Loulis as Michael Kourtis
- Andreas Georgiou as Pavlos Sekeris
- Aimilia Ypsilanti as Sofia Kourti
- Marylia Giallouridou as Sofia Kourti (younger)
- Giorgos Zenios as Pavlos Athanasiou (grandfather)
- Andreas Tselepos as Pavlos Athanasiou (younger)
- Vasiliki Troufakou as Ifigeneia Charalampous
- Neoklis Neokleous as Dimitris Neokleous
- Sofia Kalli as Mairi Eleftheriadi
- Martha Konstantinou – Mairi Eleftheriadi (younger)
- Stefanos Michail as Thodoris Panagou
- Sofia Pavlidou as Katerina Sefertzi
- Astero Kyprianou as Nantia Olympiou
- Dafni Kiourktsoglou as Marianna Sekeri
- Marianna Santi as Simoni Artemiou
- Vaggelis Kakouriotis as Tefkros Konstantinou
- Christina Papadopoulou as Dafni Sekeri
- Dimitris Antoniou as Nikitas Artemiou
- Grigoris Georgiou as Kleanthis Hatzis
- Loukia Mousoulioti as Tasoula Kyriakou
- Athos Antoniou as Giorgos Zisimatos
- Angelos Georgiou as young Andrikos Sekeri
- Andreas Christodoulou as young Marios Constantinou
- Grigoris Valtinos as Archbishop of Cyprus Makarios III
- Despoina Mpempedeli as Charita Mantoles
