= Fanis Mouratidis =

Greek actor

- Born: September 13, 1970 (age 56); Thessaloniki, Greece
- Occupation: Actor

Fanis Mouratidis is a Greek actor.

== Biography ==
Fanis Mouratidis was born in Thessaloniki, Greece. Even though he was accepted in several Greek university schools, he chose to study acting and finally graduated from the drama school of National Theatre of Northern Greece (NTNG).

He moved to Athens after being encouraged to do so by theatre director Kostas Tsianos. He first appeared on stage in 1992 in Fioro tou Levante which was staged by NTNG and directed by Vaggelis Theodoropoulos. His first cinema appearance was in Gamilia Narki directed by Dimitris Indores. He first appeared on TV in Etsi Ksafnika, a series written by Mirella Papaoikonomou in 2004. He has appeared in multiple successful TV series, films and theatre plays. He plays in Maestro, a Greek TV series written and directed by Christophoros Papakaliatis - Maestro is the first series written and played in greek language that Netflix bought.

He loves to travel. He is married to Greek actress, Anna - Maria Papaharalampous since 2008 and they have two sons.

== Filmography ==
=== Film ===
| Year | Title | Role | Notes | Ref. |
|---|---|---|---|---|
| 2003 | Weeding Mine | Thomas Petropoulos | film debut | |
| 2006 | .the girl | man | short film | |
| 2006 | 5 Minutes More | Konstantinos | | |
| 2008 | Bank Bang | passenger in Crane | | |
| 2009 | Die for you | Lukas | | |
| 2012 | What If... | Giorgos | | |
| 2015 | Amore Mio | Panos | | |
| 2017 | Jamaica | Timos | | |
| 2018 | The taste of love | Aris | television film | |

=== Television ===
| Year | Title | Role(s) | Notes |
|---|---|---|---|
| 2000 | Georgios Vizyinos: The silence of the angels | | 1 episode |
| 2004-2005 | Suddenly | Marinos | Lead role, 20 episodes |
| 2005 | Safe Sex TV Stories | Kimonas | Episode: "Barbarella is dead" |
| 2005 | The Red Suite | Stratos | Episode: "One night in Athens" |
| 2005-2006 | The contact | Alexis | Lead role, 28 episodes |
| 2006 | You go, you come | Giorgos | Lead role, 11 episodes |
| 2006-2007 | Elli Lambeti: The last play | Kostas Karras | 4 episodes |
| 2007 | Ioanna from the heart | | 1 episode |
| 2007-2008 | Dad don't drive fast! | Vasilis | Lead role, 28 episodes |
| 2008 | Who's catching us! | Panagiotis Loris | 4 episodes |
| 2009 | Seven Deadly Mothers-In-Law | Iakovos Mavromichalis | Episode: "The Deadly Mother-in-Law" |
| 2009 | Working Woman | Makis | Episode: "Popi Pie" |
| 2009 | Working Woman | Petros Papaioannou | Episode: "Multinational executive" |
| 2009-2010 | M+M: Michalis + Margarita | Michalis Typaldos | Lead role, 27 episodes |
| 2011-2012 | Clinical Case | Baltas | 2 episodes |
| 2014-2015 | Modern Family | Migel Dalmas | 2 episodes |
| 2018-2020 | Throw the fryer away | Kimon Orlov | Lead role, 114 episodes |
| 2021 | Love with an age distance | Stelios | 7 episodes |
| 2022-2026 | Maestro in Blue | Fanis Mylonas | Lead role, 20 episodes |
| 2023 | Mary Mary Mary | Konstantinos | 1 episode |
| 2024 | The net | Alekos Bardis | Episode: "Hidden in the dark" |
| 2024-2026 | Money Drop | Himself (host) | Season 4-5 |
| 2026-present | Nterti | Paschalis Michos | Lead role |
