= Opa! =

- Directed by: Udayan Prasad
- Screenplay by: Christina Concetta; Raman Singh
- Produced by: Jeffrey Bloom; Thierry Cagianut; Elliott Kastner; George Pappas; Nikos Sekeris; Alexis Varouxakis
- Starring: Matthew Modine
- Cinematography: Haris Zambarloukos
- Edited by: Barrie Vince
- Music by: Stephen Warbeck
- Release date: 2005
- Running time: 97 minutes
- Language: English

Opa! is a 2005 film directed by Udayan Prasad and starring Matthew Modine.

It was shot in Greece.

== Plot ==
Eric travels from Chicago aiming to continue his late father's quest for St. John the Evangelist's mythical cup. The only hindrance is that it is located under a profitable tavern of Katarina- who wins his heart.

== Cast ==
- Matthew Modine as Eric
- Richard Griffiths as Tierney
- Alki David as Spyros Kakogiannis
- Agni Scott as Katerina
- Panayota Aravantzi as Agapoula
- Eirini Koumarianou as Yaya Adriana
- Christos Valavanidis as Mayor
- Shuler Hensley as Big Mac McLaren

== Reception ==
On review aggregator website Rotten Tomatoes, the film holds an approval rating of 9% based on reviews from 11 critics, with an average rating of 4.3/10.
