= Vlassis Bonatsos =

Greek entertainer and singer

- Born: 30 November 1949; Xylokastro, Greece
- Died: 14 October 2004 (aged 54); Athens, Greece
- Occupation(s): Actor, TV-presenter, singer
- Spouse: Martha Koutoumanou (1996–2004)

Vlassis Bonatsos (Greek: Βλάσσης Μπονάτσος) (30 November 1949 – 14 October 2004) was a popular Greek entertainer and singer.

== Biography ==
His father was a judicial officer and his mother was a piano teacher. Vlassis started his music career by creating a group named "PELOMA BOKIOU" ("ΠΕΛΟΜΑ ΜΠΟΚΙΟΥ") in the early 1970s. The band members came up with the name after combining syllables of their last names: DaPEris, LOgothetis, MArinakis, BOnatsos and KIOUrktsoglou. In the early 1980s he costarred in the legendary theatrical play "Evita" starring Aliki Vougiouklaki (Αλίκη Βουγιουκλάκη) and him as Che. He maintained a relationship with Vougiouklaki for several years. Then he took up acting and starred in Greek movies, but his fame reached its peak in the 1990s when he started participating in popular TV series such as "Aparadektoi" (1991). He is also remembered as a presenter of iconic TV shows and gameshows on Greek TV including the Greek version of Family Feud (named in Greek: Kontres). In Kontres his memorable catchphrase was "Tora!!!!!" (Now!!!) with a characteristic sudden raise in his voice (almost yelling). On the morning of Thursday, October 14, 2004, Vlassis, while making chamomile for himself and his wife, felt something in his throat. He told his wife to look into his mouth with a flashlight, and she told him to go to hospital. He suddenly became unable to breathe and eventually fainted. They called an ambulance which arrived after half an hour, but it was too late for Vlassis. He arrived at hospital dead. According to the press the cause of death was asphyxiation, due to obstructive laryngitis.

== Music ==
- Epikindini isoropia (1976)
- Genika (1981)
- Auta ta vradia (1983), LP
- Paralirima (1991)
- Xairete (1996)

== Television ==
- Me to kleidi sto heri (TV game)
- Oi Aparadektoi - as Vlassis
- Ekeines Kai Ego - guest star
- Family Feud, the Greek version with the same board but with similar colors, theme song, Greek title and several characteristics but the same attitude as Family Feud, it was known as Kontres or Kondres in Greek and was broadcast at 6:30 EET (5:30 CET) on Mega Channel in the mid-1990s and on Mega Cosmos in the early-2000s in the afternoons.

== Selected filmography ==
- I arhontissa kai o alitis (1968)
- O Drakos, to prosopo tis imeras (1983)
- Ela tora... pou leipei o andras mou (1986)
- Tile-kannivaloi (1987)
- Patris, listeia, oikogeneia (1987)
- O Agapitikos tis... Dimitroulas (1989)
- O Diavolos kai to kerato tou (1989)
- O Drapetis (1991)
- Gynaikes dilitirio (1993)
- Vitsia gynaikon (2000)
