= Eftyhismenoi Mazi =

- Eftyhismenoi Mazi title card
- Genre: Comedy
- Created by: Daniel Écija; Álex Pina
- Based on: Los Serrano
- Screenplay by: Rena Rigga; Konstantinos Ganosis
- Directed by: Andreas Morfonios
- Starring: Giannis Mpezos; Katerina Lechou; Dimitris Mavropoulos; Ioanna Pilichou; Petros Bousoulopoulos
- Theme music composer: Jeronimo Yanka
- Country of origin: Greece
- Original language: Greek
- No. of seasons: 2
- No. of episodes: 60 +1 TV film

Production
- Executive producer: Kiki Grigoriou
- Production locations: Athens, Greece
- Running time: 42-45 minutes
- Production company: Studio ATA

Original release
- Network: Mega Channel
- Release: 5 October 2007 – 7 October 2009

Eftyhismenoi mazi or Eutichismenoi Mazi (English: Happy Together) is a Greek comedy TV series that was aired in Mega Channel during the seasons 2007–08 and 2008–09. The screenplay was adapted by the Spanish series Los Serrano.

Starred by Giannis Bezos, Katerina Lehou, Dimitris Mavropoulos, Ioanna Pilichou and Petros Bousoulopoulos.

It was awarded as the best comedy series in "Prosopa" Greek Television Awards for the season 2008–09. It was one of the most successful series and according to television ratings, it was being watched by over 2.000.000 spectators every week.

== Plot ==
Dionisis, a widower, and Eleni, a divorcée, get married, the former with three sons and the latter with two daughters from their previous marriages. The cohabitation starts to become difficult because the teenage children fell in love with each other. But, the love between them is impossible because they are formally relatives, a fact which creates hectic situations in the family. Among the main roles are also the Kotsabasis family, the friends of Dionisis and Eleni, Spyros, Dionisis' brother, Ifigeneia, Eleni's mother and Dionisis' mother-in-law, Fotis, the waiter at Dionisis' and Spyros' beer house, and the children's schoolmates.

== Cast ==
Character	Portrayed by	Seasons		
Character	Portrayed by	1	2	Film
Dionisis Mavrotsoukalos	Giannis Bezos	Main	Main	Main
Eleni Palaiologou-Mavrotsoukalou	Katerina Lehou	Main	Main	Main
Spyros Mavrotsoukalos	Dimitris Mavropoulos	Main	Main	Main
Ifigeneia Saslidou	Alexandra Pantelaki	Main	Main	Main
Vicky Georgiou	Vivi Koka	Main	Main	Main
Makis Kotsampasis	Tasos Giannopoulos	Main	Main	Main
Markos Mavrotsoukalos	Petros Bousoulopoulos	Main	Main	Main
Eva Palaiologou	Ioanna Pilichou	Main	Main	Main
Fotis Mastrapas-Tsigdemoglou	Thanasis Tsaltabasis	Main	Main	Main
Alexis Georgiou	Giorgos Dambasis	Main	Guest	
Ifigeneia "Fifi" Palaiologou	Evi Daelli	Main	Main	Main
Thanasis Mavrotsoukalos	Aris Tsapis	Main	Main	Main
Giannakis Mavrotsoukalos	Savvas Salipas	Main	Main	Main
Mitsos Kotsampasis	Kostas Intzegian	Recurring	Main	Main
Aglaia Pagona	Evaggelia Moumouri		Guest	Guest
Afroula	Evi Sarmi	Recurring		
Afroula	Niki Anastasiou		Recurring	Recurring

== Episodes ==
Season	Episodes	Originally released		Average viewership (%)
Season	Episodes	First released	Last released	Average viewership (%)
1	30	October 5, 2007	June 13, 2008	35.03%
2	30	October 10, 2008	June 21, 2009	39.76%
Film	1	October 7, 2009		43.90%

== Awards ==
The series received the below awards in "Prosopa" Greek Television Awards:

- Best Comedy TV Series
- Best actor (Giannis Bezos)
- Best comedy screenplay (Rena Rigga)
