= Fotopoulos =

Fotopoulos (Greek: Φωτόπουλος) or Photopoulos (sometimes for female persons it becomes: Fotopoulou or Photopoulou) is a Greek surname. Notable people with the surname include:

- Danielle Fotopoulos (born 1976), soccer player, US women's national soccer team
- George Fotopoulos, former head coach of the LSU women's soccer team
- Helen Fotopulos, Montreal city councillor
- James Fotopoulos (born 1976), American independent filmmaker
- Konstantinos Fotopoulos (born 1959), Greek convicted murderer on death row in Florida
- Mimis Fotopoulos (1913–1986), Greek actor
- Takis Fotopoulos (born 1940), Greek political writer and editor
- Vassilis Photopoulos (1934–2007), Greek painter and film director
