= Nikko Patrelakis =

Nikos "Nikko" Patrelakis (Greek: Νίκος Πατρελάκης) is a Greek musician.

As a DJ he has contributed to the evolution of the Greek club scene, participating in the initiation of clubs like X-club, Factory, +Soda in Athens and Cavo Paradiso Club Mykonos in Mykonos as a resident DJ.

== Biography ==
He was born in Athens, Greece. He studied music at the National Conservatoire and mathematics at the University of Athens.

In 1999 he co-wrote "Voice" with Paul McCartney which was presented by Heather Mills for the support of people with kinetic disabilities. That year he released 'Habitat' his first solo album, introducing his unique sound, followed up two years later by "Elements", a continuous play release in the form of a soundtrack, with guests like famous Greek journalist Malvina Karali narrating, and Stamatis Kraounakis, one of the most important Greek contemporary songwriters, improvising on a piano. In 2003 he released the album TIME, which stayed for 9 weeks in the official IFPI national top 50. He also composed and produced three themes for the opening and closing ceremonies of the Olympic Games in Athens 2004, performed by him and London Philharmonic Orchestra, for the parade of the Greek flag and the Greek team, in the opening ceremonies, and for the entrance of the athletes of the world in the Olympic Stadium, for the closing ceremonies.

That year he also composed and produced the soundtrack of “Hostage”, directed by Constantine Giannaris, which was the official Greek participation in the Panorama of the Berlinale 2005. The film won the prize for the best direction in the Thessaloniki Film Festival 2005 and was nominated for the Helix Award of the European Film Academy. His last album Echo was released worldwide in 2007 and gathered excellent reviews from the press. It included a variety of sounds, from 'Magnet', a fully arranged piece performed by him and the Symphonic Orchestra of the Greek National Television, to "Shortcut", a collaboration with K.Bhta, to "Voyage" including the narration of French radio producer Louis Bozon. Cinematic ambiances, orchestral elements, deep rhythms and dreamy electric guitars produce a nu-jazz aroma with an electronic accent, that is the characteristic sound of Nikko Patrelakis.

He has participated in several exhibitions as a visual artist and in 2008 he made his first personal photography exhibition in Athens under the title "Ec(h)o".
