= Anna-Maria Papaharalambous =

Greek actress

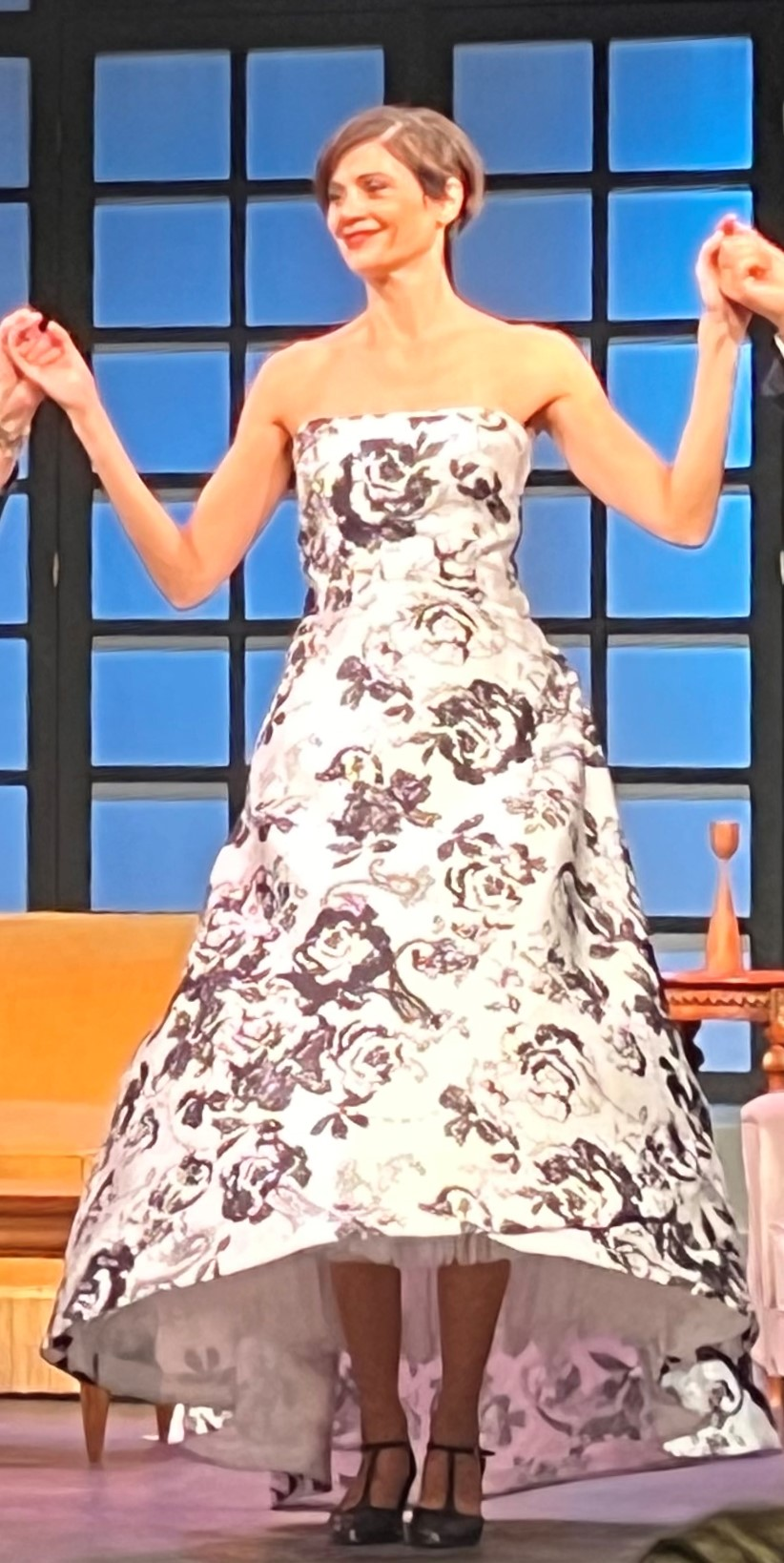
Anna Maria Papacharalampous, 2023

Anna-Maria Papaharalambous (Άννα-Μαρία Παπαχαραλάμπους, born 1974) is a Greek stage, television, and film actress. She came into prominence by starring in the dramatic series by Manousos Manousakis Psithiroi Kardias. She is married to actor Fanis Mouratidis and they have two children.

== Stage Credits ==
- Οι Ηλίθιοι
  - Phonetic: I Ilithioi
  - Translation: The Idiots

== Television Credits ==
- Ψίθυροι Καρδιάς
  - Phonetic: Psithiroi Kardias
  - Translation: Whispers of the Heart
  - Released: 1997
  - Character: Ερατώ (Erato)
- Οι Τρεις Χήρες
  - Phonetic: Oi Treis Chires
  - Translation: The Three Widows
  - Released: 2000
  - Character: Ανθούλα (Anthoula)
- Άρωμα Γύναικας
  - Phonetic: Aroma Gynaikas
  - Translation: Scent of a Woman
  - Released: 2000
  - Character: Έλενα (Elena)
- Σχεδόν Ποτε
  - Phonetic: Shedon Pote
  - Translation: Almost Never
  - Released: 2003
  - Character: Κάλια (Kalia)
- Κανείς Δε Λέει Σ'αγαπώ
  - Phonetic: Kaneis The Leei S'agapo
  - Translation: No One Says "I Love You"
  - Released: 2004
  - Character: Κορίνα (Corina)
- Μαργαρίτα
  - Phonetic: Margarita
  - Translation: Margarita
  - Released: 2007
  - Character: Μαργαρίτα (Margarita)
- Μπαμπά Μην Τρέχεις
  - Phonetic: Baba Min Treheis
  - Translation: Daddy don't speed
  - Released: 2007
  - Character: Μόνα (Mona)
- Κλινική Περίπτωση
  - Phonetic: Kliniki Periptosi
  - Translation: Clinical Case
  - Released: 2011
  - Character: Ανδριάννα (Andrianna)

== Film Credits ==
- Τα Ρόδινα Ακρογιάλια
  - Phonetic: Ta Rodina Akroyialia
  - Translation: The Rose Shores
  - Released: 1998
  - Character: Περμαχούλα (Permachoula)
- Η Αγάπη Είναι Ελέφαντας
  - Phonetic: I Agapi Einai Elefantas
  - Translation: Love is an Elephant
  - Released: 2000
  - Character: Χριστίνα (Christina)
- Φτηνά Τσιγάρα
  - Phonetic: Ftina Tsigara
  - Translation: Cheap Cigarettes
  - Released: 2000
  - Character: Σοφία (Sophia)

== Filmography ==
=== Television ===
Year	Title	Role(s)	Notes
1996	The Father's Son	Anna-Maria	1 episode
1997-1998	Whispers of a Soul	Erato	Lead role, 34 episodes
1999	Victims of Peace	Maria Nomikou	Lead role, 15 episodes
1999	Friends Again	Niki	2 episodes
2000-2001	Scent of a Woman	Elena Komninou	Lead role, 27 episodes
2001-2002	The Three Widows	Anthoula	Lead role, 22 episodes
2003-2004	Almost Never	Maria	Lead role, 20 episodes
2004-2005	Nobody says I Love You	Korina	Lead role, 32 episodes
2005	10th command	Loukia	Episode: "In vain"
2006	10th command	Sevi	Episode: "XXSmall"
2006	10th command	Dora	Episode: "For money"
2006	The stories of detective Beka	Maria Modesadou	Episode: "Doubts"
2006-2007	Margarita	Margarita Hrysospathi	Lead role, 20 episodes
2007	10th command	Voula	Episode: "Let Voula see!"
2007	10th command	Herself	Episode: "The end"
2007-2008	Dad don't rush!	Mona	Lead role, 28 episodes
2009	Seven Deadly Mothers-In-Law	Kallista Arianidi	Episode: "The Mother-In-Law from the Future"
2011-2012	Clinical Case	Andrianna Mpasi	Lead role, 18 episodes
2014	The Home of Emma	Athanasia	1 episode
2016-2017	Like a Family	Niki	Lead role, 84 episodes
2018-2019	The Return	Elena Deli	Lead role, 162 episodes
2022	Oath	Iro Anagnostopoulou	Lead role, 36 episodes
2022	The Numbers	Erato	Episode: "Smoke-Smoke"
2024-2025	The net	Antigone Makri	Lead role, 12 episodes
2025-2026	The child	Vana	Lead role, 150 episodes

=== Film ===
Year	Title	Role	Notes	Ref.
1998	The Rose Shores	Permachoula	Film debut	
1998	Quest for Camelot	Kayley	Greek voice role	
2000	Love is an elephant	Christina		
2000	Cheap Cigarettes	Sophia		
2003	Destroy all brains!		short movie	
2005	The easy Liah	Liah		
2014	Very Sudden	Eva		
2017	Jamaica	Nina		
2021	A trip on stars	Stella		
2024	I've something to tell you	Herself	Cameo	
