= Anna Panagiotopoulou =

Greek actress and screenwriter (1945–2024)

- Άννα Παναγιωτοπούλου
- Born: 30 July 1945; Kypseli, Athens, Greece
- Died: 4 May 2024 (aged 78); Likavittos, Athens, Greece
- Resting place: Zografos Cemetery
- Citizenship: Greece
- Education: National Theatre of Greece Drama School
- Occupations: Actress; screenwriter; playwright; comedian; singer
- Years active: 1968–2017
- Spouse: Panagiotis Damoulakis (m. 1972; died 2014)
- Partner: Alexis Kallitsis
- Children: 1

Anna Panagiotopoulou (Greek: Άννα Παναγιωτοπούλου; 30 July 1945 – 4 May 2024) was a Greek actress, screenwriter, and playwright. She starred in many TV shows, films, and theatrical plays.

== Life and career ==
Panagiotopoulou was born on 30 July 1945 in the Kypseli neighbourhood of Athens. She became famous after starring in the Greek series Madam Sousou in 1986.

A major hit of her career was starring as one of the three Haritou sisters, Olga, in the Greek hit series Oi Treis Harites during 1990-92. In 1993 she wrote and starred in the series Rosalia (with Eleni Gerasimidou). The series lasted only 1 season due to low ratings. In 1995, she starred in another successful series Ντόλτσε Βίτα as Christina Markatou. The series drew high ratings and lasted 2 seasons.

Panagiotopoulou also enjoyed a successful film career, having appeared in several commercially and critically successful films such as Safe Sex (1999) and To Klama Vgike Apo ton Paradiso (Crying... Silicon Tears) (2001).

Panagiotopoulou died from complications of Alzheimer's disease at her home in the Likavittos neighbourhood of Athens, on 4 May 2024, at age 78. She was buried at Zografou Cemetery, on the outskirts of Athens on May 9.
