= Kaneis de leei s' agapo =

- Genre: Comedy drama
- Written by: Markella Grigoriou, Antigoni Pappa
- Starring: Anna-Maria Papaharalambous; Giorgos Karamihos; Kleon Grigoriadis; Konstadia Hristoforidou; Kostas Triantafyllopoulos; Melpo Kosti; Thanasis Kourlabas; Mary Halkia
- Country of origin: Greece
- Original language: Greek
- No. of seasons: 1
- No. of episodes: 32

Production
- Running time: 45 min

Original release
- Network: Mega Channel
- Release: 30 September 2004

Kaneis de leei s' agapo (Greek: Κανείς δε λέει σ' αγαπώ) is a Greek popular television series written by Markella Grigoriou and Antigoni Pappa and directed by Stefanos Kontomaris, which aired on Mega Channel in 2004 and ran for 32 episodes.

The series focused on the love story between Korina and Haris, two entirely different people who are in denial of their sentiments but after getting through various emotional situations, they eventually prove that opposites attract.

== Cast and characters ==
=== Main characters ===
Actor	Character
Anna-Maria Papaharalambous	Korina
Giorgos Karamihos	Haris
Kleon Grigoriadis	Anastasis
Konstadia Hristoforidou	Vera
Kostas Triantafyllopoulos	Stefanos
Melpo Kosti	Katerina
Mairi Halkia	Hariklia
Thomas Paliouras	Spiros
Thanasis Kourlabas	Miltos
Pantelis Kanarakis	Apo
Peni Stathaki	Lilly
Jenny Diagoupi	Haroula

=== Guest stars ===
Actor	Character
Antigoni Drakoulaki	Rita
Gina Alimonou	Dimitra
