= Oi Treis Harites =

Greek comedy TV series (1990–1992)

- The three stars of the series. From left to right: Mina Adamaki (Eirini); Anna Panayiotopoulou (Olga); Nena Menti (Maria)
- Genre: Comedy
- Created by: Michalis Reppas; Thanasis Papathanasiou
- Written by: Michalis Reppas; Thanasis Papathanasiou
- Directed by: Theodoros Polychroniadis
- Starring: Anna Panayiotopoulou; Nena Menti; Mina Adamaki
- Theme music composer: Antonis Plessas
- Composer: Antonis Plessas
- Country of origin: Greece
- Original language: Greek
- No. of seasons: 3
- No. of episodes: 90

Production
- Executive producer: Efi Anastasiou
- Producer: Elvira Ralli
- Production locations: Athens, Greece
- Running time: 30 min
- Production company: Studio ATA

Original release
- Network: Mega Channel
- Release: February 8, 1990 – April 20, 1992

Oi Treis Harites (Greek: Οι Τρεις Χάριτες, The Three Harites) is a Greek comedy series created by Michalis Reppas and Thanasis Papathanasiou which aired on Mega Channel from February 8, 1990 to April 20, 1992. The name "Harites" was taken partly from ancient Greek mythology (The Three Graces) and partly from their surname, which was "Haritou".

The series describes the daily life of three single sisters in their middle forties who live in the same house.

Oi Treis Harites received positive reviews, becoming one of the most popular and successful programs ever shown on Greek television, achieving high ratings throughout its run. During the season 1989-1990 and 1991-1992 Oi Treis Harites was the most popular series in Greek television, making history reaching 65% according to AGB Nielsen Media Research on February 3, 1992. According to Mega Channel, the initial title of the series was "Anna and her Sisters".

The series was released in DVD from the magazine Tilerama in April 2010.

== Series overview ==
The series revolves around the three sisters Olga, Maria and Eirini which are in their mid forties. They are daughters of a judge and grew up in a two-store house that now belongs to the youngest sister, Eirini. When Olga gets married and Maria does the same, they grow apart for about 20 years, until Olga gets widowed and Maria leaves her husband after his adultery. The sisters then, return to their family residence.

== The Three Sisters ==
- Anna Panayiotopoulou portrays Olga, the eldest sister. Olga is a widow who wants to control her daughter's life, who studies in London. She has an antique shop in Athens. She gets sarcastic in tricky situations and is proud of her blue eyes.
- Nena Menti portrays Maria, the middle sister. Maria is an advertiser with a high sense of humour. She gets a divorce from her husband in the first episode of the series. She is the most logical of the three.
- Mina Adamaki portrays Eirini, the youngest sister. Eirini is a bit of a hysterical woman, with bad luck in her love life since she is not married yet. She is obsessed with keeping the house clean and that's a reason she often quarrels with her sisters. She was the initial resident of the house, which she inherited from her parents.
- Anna Kyriakou portrays Bebeka, the beloved aunt of the three sisters. Aunt Bebeka is a daily visitor. Classy, with finesse, clever but at the same time gullible. She often surprises her nieces with her progressive opinions and her restless youth.

== Seasons ==
=== Season 1 ===
Season 1 consists of 22 episodes and begins with Maria trying to persuade Eirini to accept their other sister, Olga, at the house because Olga has to wait for her house to be built. Eirini unwillingly accepts, but in the middle of the first episode Maria announces that she is getting divorced from her husband and she is going to stay with her sisters. The whole season shows their life, the difficulties they face living all together again under the same roof, their constant problems with men and many other hilarious adventures. In the last episode of the first season, the three sisters are making plans for their vacations.

=== Season 2 ===
Season 2 consists of 40 episodes and is the largest season. It begins with the three sisters having returned from their vacations and trying to attract a charming man living next door to them. The season continues with the sisters handling hilarious situations in each episode. In the 7th episode of the season, a big change happens. Olga's daughter, Teti, abandons her studies in London and comes to Athens. Initially, Olga, disagrees with her decision and tries to persuade her to return to London, but soon she realises it is better to have Teti under the same roof. But there is one problem. Teti wants to have her own apartment, and then the conspiracies begin. The season ends with Olga and Maria leaving the house since Eirini is now in a serious relationship.

=== Season 3 ===
Season 3 consists of 28 episodes. The third and final season begins with the sisters living in their own apartments. But due to some difficulties they face, both Olga and Maria return home. The series ends with their younger brother, Andreas, getting married and having a daughter with Olga's assistant in the antique shop. The three sisters are now in serious relationships and in the final scene they reminisce on the three years they were together, saying that life goes on.

== Cast and characters ==
=== Main characters ===
- Anna Panayiotopoulou as Olga Haritou
- Nena Menti as Maria Haritou
- Mina Adamaki as Eirini Haritou
- Anna Kyriakou as Aunt Bebeka
- Michalis Reppas as Andreas Haritos

Nena Menti was the last actress cast. The creators initially wanted Mirka Papakonstantinou to portray Maria, but for unknown reasons she refused. However, Papakonstantinou appeared in the series, guest starring in one episode in season 2.

=== Recurring Characters ===
- Anna Kouri as Teti, Olga's daughter
- Eleni Kastani as Ntina, Olga's assistant

=== Notable Guest Stars ===
In the series many well-known actors made guest appearances during its three seasons. Some of those were long-established stars of film, stage and television, others would find considerable fame and recognition after appearing in the show. Notable appearances of celebrities (whether famous then or later) include those of:

- Maria Foka
- Dina Konsta
- Mirka Papakonstantinou
- Dimitra Papadopoulou
- Jessie Papoutsi
- Joyce Evidi
- Renia Louizidou
- Zozo Sapountzaki
- Alexandros Antonopoulos
- Tasos Chalkias
- Eleni Gerasimidou
- Christos Valavanidis
- Vladimiros Kuriakidis
- Ivoni Maltezou
- Apostolos Gletsos
- Petros Filipidis
- Tryfon Karatzas
- Christos Simardanis
- Ismini Kalesi
- Gregoris Valtinos
- Maria Kanellopoulou
- Labis Livieratos
- Pavlos Kontogiannidis
- Yannis Bezos
- Alkistis Protopsalti
- Kostas Makedonas
- Stamatis Kraounakis

== Crossovers ==
Anna Panayiotopoulou, Nena Menti and Mina Adamaki guest starred in one episode as the Haritou Sisters in another comedy series that broadcast by Mega Channel, I Eliza kai Oi Alloi in 1992 written by Alexandros Rigas who in 1995 would work with Anna Panayiotopoulou in another hit series Ntoltse Vita again on Mega Channel.

== Reruns ==
The series ended its run in 1992. Mega Channel rerun the show multiple times. From 1992 to 1997, in 2004, in 2009 and in 2010.

== Reunion ==
To honour the twenty years of operation of Mega Channel, a small number of new episodes of the series were to be shown in 2009-2010. Michalis Reppas along with Thanasis Papathanasiou wrote the script. All the cast members agreed to reprise their roles. The story of the four episodes would find Maria and Eirini living in the same block of flats but in different apartments and Olga in Tinos. The three sisters would reunite after Bebeka's prompt to find their nanny. As always, they would make a mess, approaching the wrong woman as their nanny, who is mixed up in an incredible story of a lost treasure and they would find themselves being stalked by two gangs of criminals that want to get rid of them. However the promising and highly anticipated reunion of the series, 18 years later, was cancelled due to financial reasons.

== See also ==
- List of programs broadcast by Mega Channel

Media offices
Preceded by Madame Sousou	Series starring Anna Panayiotopoulou; 1990-1992	Next: Ntoltse Vita
