= Tis Ellados ta Paidia =

Greek comedy television series

- Genre: Comedy
- Created by: Dimitris Venizelos
- Written by: Dimitris Venizelos; Dimitris Fragioglou
- Directed by: Giannis Bezos; Dimitris Venizelos
- Starring: Giannis Bezos; Chrysoula Diavati; Nikos Alexiou; Kostas Evripiotis; Giannis Savvidakis; Dimitris Fragioglou; Giannis Kapetanios
- Country of origin: Greece
- Original language: Greek
- No. of seasons: 2
- No. of episodes: 54

Production
- Executive producer: Kappa Studios
- Production locations: Studio Alfa, Athens, Greece
- Running time: 22-25 minutes

Original release
- Network: ANT1
- Release: September 1993 – 1995

Tis Ellados ta Paidia (English: The Children of Greece) is a Greek comedy television series that was aired for two seasons (1993–1994 and 1994–1995) by ANT1 TV. The series was created by Dimitris Venizelos and it stars Giannis Bezos, Chrysoula Diavati, Nikos Alexiou, Kostas Evripiotis, Giannis Savvidakis, Dimitris Fragioglou, Giannis Kapetanios and others.

The series became great success and it is often selected by the audience as one of the best Greek TV-series of all times. It is maybe the first Greek surrealist comedy. The series included nice dialogues with clever cues.

== Plot ==
Three aircraftmen have their military service in an aviation office camp, commanded by Group Captain Epaminondas Kakalos. Kakalos is a strict commander, but he is also ambitious, flirtatious and sometimes blunderer. Other basic members of the cast are Hlapatsas, a nark aircraftman, Karavaneas, a naive sergeant and Boubou, the commander's secretary. The series is based on the funny situations between the staff of this aviation camp.

== Cast ==
- Giannis Bezos as Group Captain Epaminondas Kakalos
- Nikos Alexiou as Aircraftman Dimosthenis Plapoutas
- Kostas Evripiotis as Aircraftman Georgios Vlachos
- Giannis Savvidakis as Aircraftman Giovanni Dallas
- Chrysoula Diavati as Elisavet Kerantari Maurodiovounioti "Boubou"
- Dimitris Fragioglou as Aircraftman Trifon Spiouneas aka Hlapatsas
- Giannis Kapetanios as Sergeant major Charalampos Karavaneas
- Aggelos Georgiadis as Air chief marshal
- Melpo Kosti as Chief master sergeant Ntina (1st season)
- Margarita Varlamou as Voula, Kakalos' fiancé (1st season)
- Elpida Ninou as Tzela, responsible for the KPSM (1st season)
- Froso Lytra as Natasa, secretary (1st season)
- Renia Louizidou as Litsa, Kakalos' flirting (2nd season)
- Tasos Kostis as Brigadier general Tzazleas (2nd season)
