= Giannis Iliopoulos =

Greek basketball player

Giannis Iliopoulos (Greek: Γιάννης Ηλιόπουλος; born 1979) is a Greek basketball player who played for AEK B.C.
