= Katerina Lehou =

Greek actress

Katerina Lechou
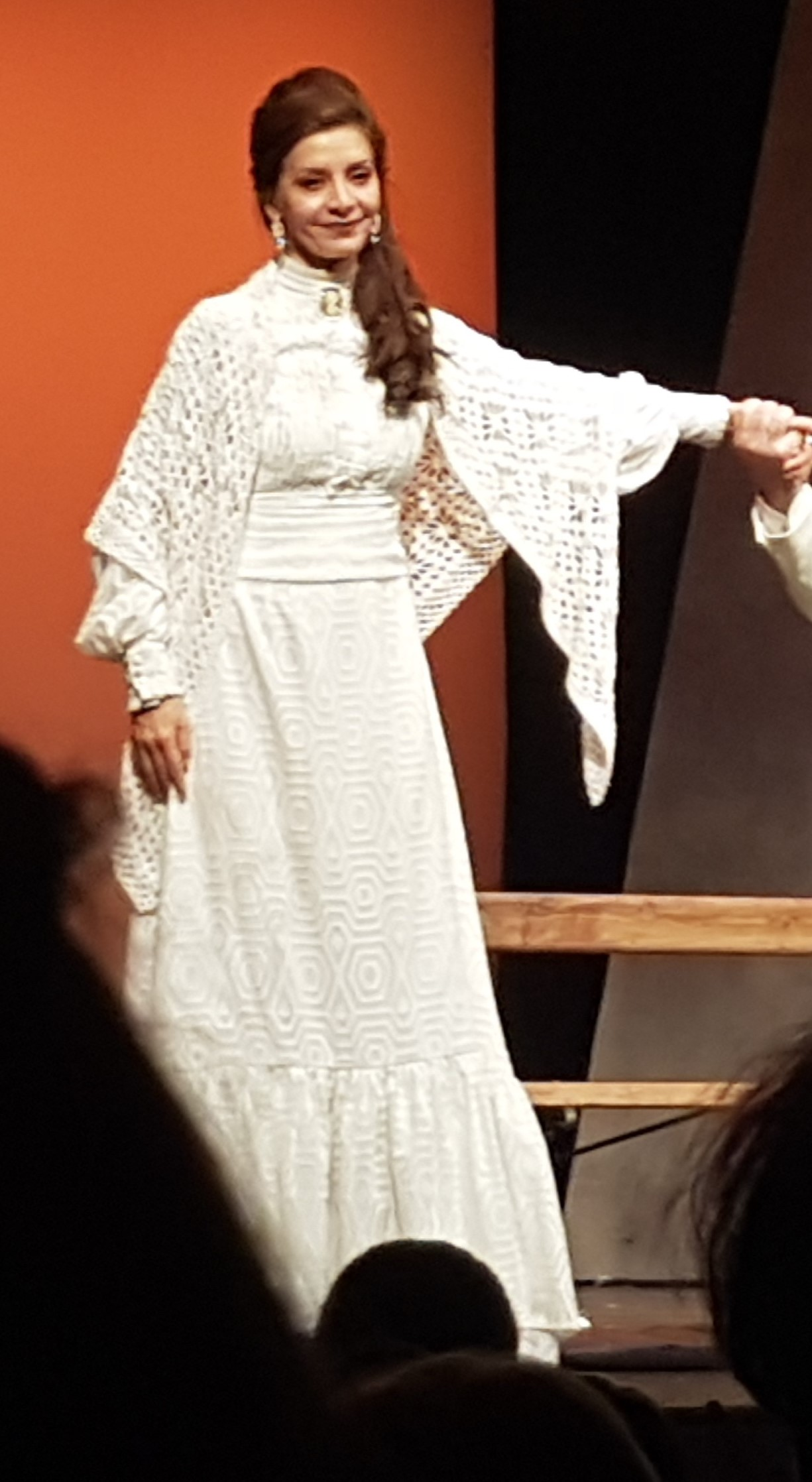
- Born: September 5, 1967 (age 59); Athens, Greece
- Occupation: Actress

Katerina Lehou (Greek: Κατερίνα Λέχου) is a Greek actress, who has been in many theatrical plays, films, and Greek television series.

== Biography ==
Lehou was born on September 5, 1967, in Athens, Greece. During her childhood, she participated in the arts, like playing the piano and reading literature. She studied and graduated from the Theater of Arts Karolos Koun.

In 1990, Lehou started acting professionally in a film named The scars of the night (Τα σημάδια της νύχτας). In 2010, she began starring on a television series called The island, based on the novel by Victoria Hislop. Viewers were really surprised by Lehou's dramatic performance, since they were used to her starring in comedy serials that she had previously been in.

Lehou participated in the Olympic torch lighting ceremony in Greece for the 2018 Winter Olympics.

== Filmography ==
=== Film ===
- Ta Simadia tis Nyhtas (1990)
- Oxygene (2003)
- Aystiros Katallilo (2008)
- Akalyptos (2013)

=== Television ===
- Oi filenades (1993)
- Parathuro ston ilio (1994)
- Ekeines kai ego (1996)
- Tzivaeri (1997)
- Oi andres den yparxoun pia (1998)
- Gamos me ta ola tou (2001)
- Eisai to Tairi mou (2001)
- San glyko tou koutaliou (2005)
- Entimotatoi keratades (2006)
- To kokkino dwmatio (2006)
- Safe Sex (2007)
- Eftyhismenoi Mazi (2007)
- To Nisi (2010)

== Theatre ==
- Το τέλος μιας σχέσης (To telos mias sxesis) (2003)
- Ο θάνατος και η κόρη (O Thanatos kai i kori) (2010)
