= Christos Valavanidis =

Greek actor (1944–2026)

- Χρήστος Βαλαβανίδης
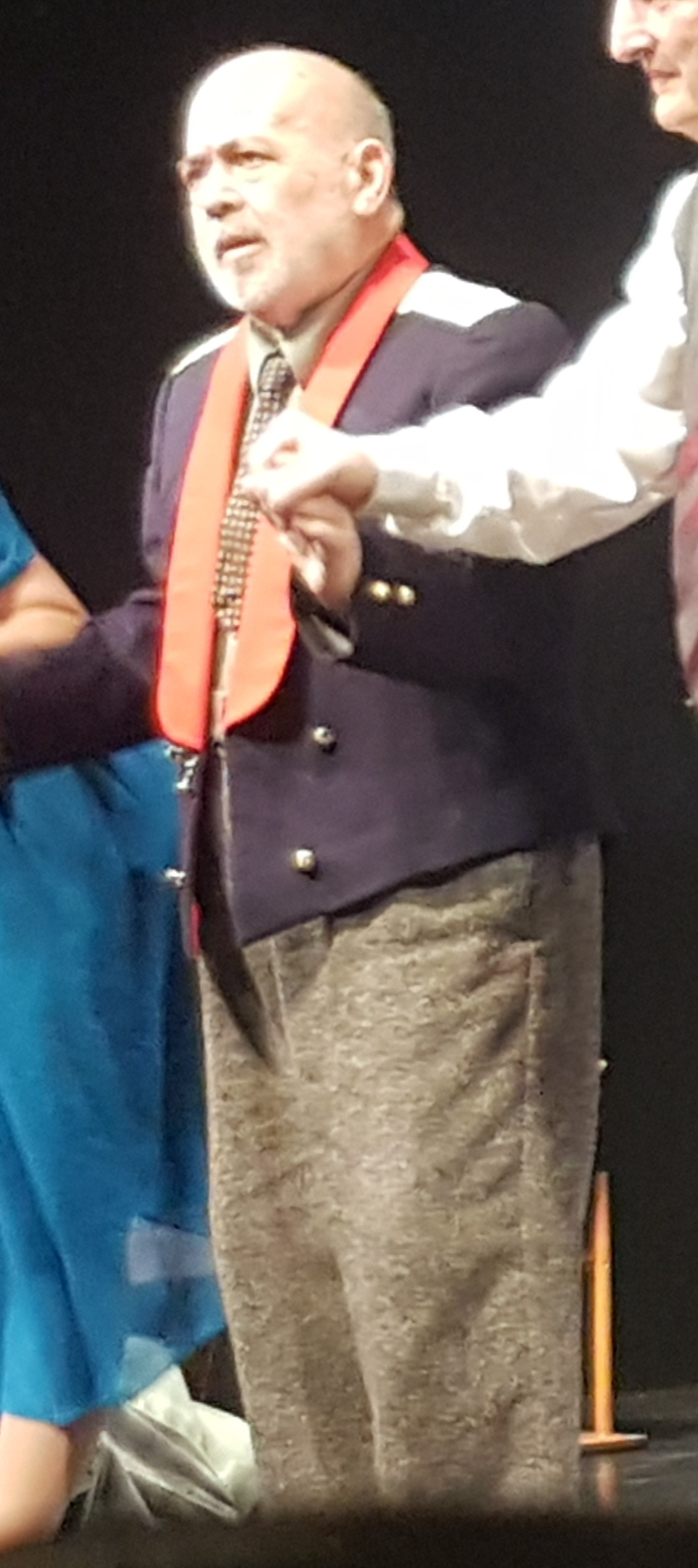
- Valavanidis in 2019
- Born: 21 May 1944; Athens, German-occupied Greece
- Died: 6 March 2026 (aged 81); Athens, Greece
- Occupations: Actor, poet
- Years active: 1979–2005
- Spouse: Aspasia Kralli
- Children: 1

Christos Valavanidis (Greek: Χρήστος Βαλαβανίδης; 21 May 1944 – 6 March 2026) was a Greek actor and poet. He graduated from the National Theatre Drama School, in 1973. He appeared in the theatre, in various television series, in theatre for television and more than sixty films from 1979 to 2026. Valavanidis also published three poetic collections.

He was married to the actress Aspasia Kralli and had one daughter, Katerina. With his wife, he created the “Apo Mihanis Theatre”.

Valavanidis died on 6 March 2026, at the age of 81.

== Selected filmography ==
Year	Title	Role	Notes
1979	The Wretches Are Still Singing		
1984	Loafing and Camouflage		
2001	Crying... Silicon Tears		
2005	Opa!		
