= What If... (2012 film) =

- Directed by: Christoforos Papakaliatis
- Starring: Christoforos Papakaliatis; Marina Kalogirou; Maro Kontou
- Release date: 29 November 2012
- Running time: 111 minutes
- Country: Greece
- Language: Greek

What If... (Greek: Αν...) is a 2012 Greek drama film directed by Christoforos Papakaliatis. The film won the Best Sound award in Hellenic Film Academy Awards.

== Cast ==
- Christoforos Papakaliatis as Dimitris
- Marina Kalogirou as Christina
- Maro Kontou as Elenitsa Kokovikou
- Giorgos Konstadinou as Antonakis Kokovikos

== Awards ==
List of awards and nominations
| Award | Category | Recipients and nominees | Result |
|---|---|---|---|
| 2013 Hellenic Film Academy Awards | Best Sound | Marinos Athanassopoulos, Aris Louziotis, Alexandros Sidiropoulos, Costas Varybopiotis | Won |
