= Maria Foka =

Greek actress

Maria Foka Μαρία Φωκά
- Born: 1 October 1916; Argostoli, Greece
- Died: 15 June 2001 (aged 84); London, England, UK
- Occupation: actress

Maria Foka (Greek: Μαρία Φωκά, 1 October 1916 – 15 June 2001) was a Greek actress and participated in character roles.

She was married to Lykourgos Kallergis. Her final role was Olga in the Mega Channel series Dolce Vita. She died in London in 2001, after years of heart problems and is buried in Bournemouth.

== Selected filmography ==
Year	Film title (English translation)	Original title and transliteration	Role
1949	Kokkinos vrachos	Κόκκινος βράχος Red Rock	Ms. Flogatorou
1960	Ikoyenia Papadopoulou	Οικογένεια Παπαδόπουλου; The Papadopoulos Family	Loukia
1964	201 Canaries	Τα 201 καναρίνια Ta 201 kanarinia	Victoria
1966	Ta adelfia	T'αδέλφια; My Children	Stelios's mother
1968	Thyella sto spiti ton anemon	Θύελλα στο σπίτι των ανέμων	–
1968	O Mikes pandrevete	Ο Μικές παντρεύεται	Loukia Pardaloglou
1968	Gymnoi sto dromo	Γυμνοί στο δρόμο	–
1968	Gorgones ke Manges	Γοργόνες και μάγκες Mermaids and Gentlemen	arhontissa
1968	A Knight for Vasoula	Ένας ιππότης για τη Βασούλα; Enas ippotis gia ti Vassoula	Kleio
1968	As me krinoun oi gynaikes	Ας με κρίνουν οι γυναίκες	–
1969	O mikros drapetis	Ο μικρός δραπέτης	–
1969	The Countess of a Factory	Η κόμισσα της φάμπρικας I komisa tis fabrikas	Ourania
1971	O aittitos	Ο αήττητος	Georgia
1972	Agapissa mia polythrona	Αγάπησα μια πολυθρόνα	Vangelitsa
1972	Agapi mou paliogria	Aγάπη μου παλιόγρια	Aristea
1972	I Aliki tis sygchronis genias	Η Αλίκη της σύγχρονης γενιάς	–

=== Television ===
Year	Film title (English translation)	Original title and transliteration	Role	Broadcaster
1991–92	Ekmek pagoto	Εκμέκ παγωτό Ekmek pagoto	–	Mega
1992–93	Kai oi tesseris itan yperoches	Και οι τέσσερις ήταν υπέροχες	–	Mega
1994–95	Enas axiolatrevtos belas	Ένας αξιολάτρευτος μπελάς	–	Mega
1995–97	Dolce Vita	Ντόλτσε Βίτα	Olga Markatou	Mega
