= Giannis Bezos =

Greek actor and director (born 1956)

- Γιάννης Μπέζος
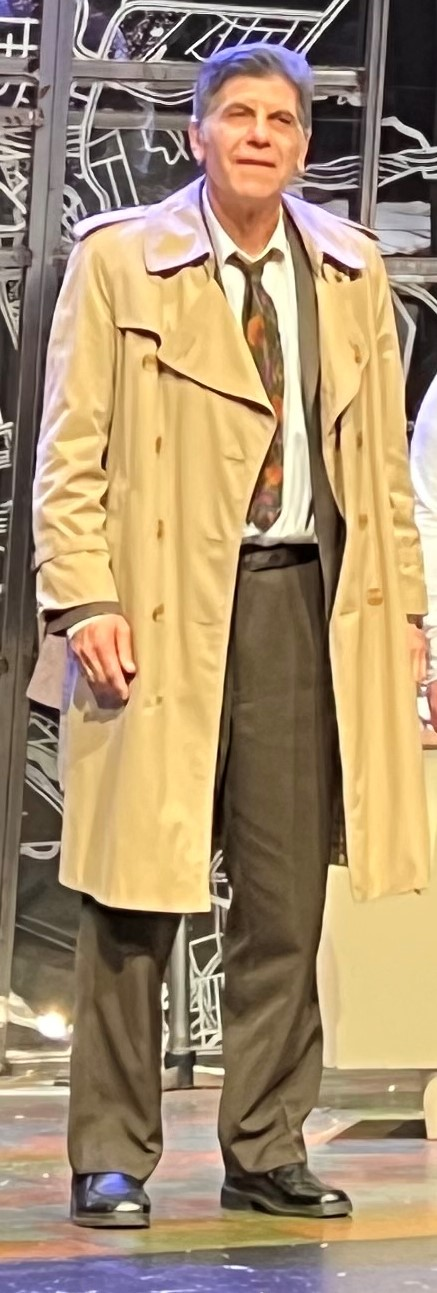
- Born: Ioannis Bezos; 10 September 1956 (age 70); Athens, Greece
- Citizenship: Greece
- Occupations: Actor; director; singer
- Years active: 1980–present
- Spouse: Natalia Tsaliki (m. 1987)
- Children: Iro Bezou
- Relatives: Tasos Kostis (cousin); Valeria Kouroupi (niece)

Ioannis Bezos (Greek: Ιωάννης Μπέζος; born 10 September 1956) is a Greek actor, director, and singer. He is considered one of the best Greek actors of his generation, performing on television, theatre and in cinema.

== Biography ==
Bezos was discovered by director and actor Thymios Karakatsanis during a performance at the Smaroula Theatre. Early in his stage career, he collaborated with Aliki Vougiouklaki. He later starred in several successful Greek television series, including Oi Aparadektoi (1991–1993), Tis Ellados ta Paidia (1993–1995), Ekeines Kai Ego (1996–1998), Flower-spread Life (1998–1999), Akros oikogeneiakon (2001–2003), Eftyhismenoi Mazi (2007–2010), My Daughter's Marriage (2010), and Clinical Case (2011). In many of these productions, Bezos worked with director Andreas Morfonios, or directed episodes himself.

During the 1980s, Bezos appeared in classical stage productions, including Aristophanes' Frogs and Lysistrata. In March 2009, he starred in a Greek production of the musical La Cage aux Folles, based on the play by Jean Poiret, which premiered at the Pallas Theatre under the direction of Stamatis Fasoulis.

In addition to acting, Bezos has performed as a vocalist in musical theatre and has recorded vocals for albums by composers Giorgos Hatzinasios, Notis Mavroudis, and Thanos Mikroutsikos. In 1987, he married actress Natalia Tsaliki, with whom he has frequently appeared on television and stage; they have a daughter, actress Iro Bezou (born 1988).

In April 2016, the Hellenic Broadcasting Corporation announced that Bezos would host the arts documentary series Milontas gia theatro (Μιλώντας για θέατρο; "Speaking of Theatre") on ERT2. He has also appeared in five feature films.

== Filmography ==
Year	Title	Role	Notes	Ref.
1983	Hooligans: Hands off the youth!	Haris	Film debut	
1987	The Woman Who Saw Dreams	Achilleas		
1987	Cover Woman	Preacher	direct-to-video	
1989	Innocent or guilty	interrogator		
1991	Imagine if it rained		short film	
1992	Up, down and sideways	waiter		
2000	Poor S.A.	Odysseas		
2001	One-time payment	Giannis		
2006	Illustration	Giorgos		
2010	From the one to the other		short film	
2010	Mikis Theodorakis	Mikis Theodorakis		
2011	Christmas Tango	Col. Manolis Loggos		
2015	Rembrandt's daughter	Malaparte		
2018	Magic skin			
2025	Christmas carols	Sofianos Karamanos		

=== Television ===
Year	Title	Role(s)	Notes
1984	Parking Space		Television debut
1986	The dilemma	Loukelis	Main role, 16 episodes
1986-1987	Vendetta	Miltos Petridis	Main role, 13 episodes
1988-1989	Who killed Avel?	Stavros Papastavrou	Main role, 13 episodes
1989	Innocent or guilty	interrogator	Main role, 7 episodes
1990	The Three Harites	seller	Episode: "The Unknown Man"
1991	Dear gentlemen		1 episode
1991-1993	The Unacceptables	Giannis Bezos	Lead role, 49 episodes
1992	Narrow hole wall contacts	Hatzipapas	1 episode
1992	Eliza and the others	Mickie	Episode: "Beautiful, young and unlucky"
1992	Anatomia enos egklimatos	Petros	Episode: "Paihnidia thanatou"
1992-1993	Tha miliseis me to dikigoro mou	Antonis Nikolopoulos	Lead role, 31 episodes
1993	Anatomia enos egklimatos		Episodes: "Timoria" / "Foul tis damas"
1993-1995	Tis Ellados ta Paidia	Epaminondas Kakalos	Lead role, 54 episodes; also directror
1994	The Good Mother-in-Law	Epaminontas Kakalos	Episode: "You can put a flag, you can!"
1995	The ridiculousness of it	Stathis	Episode: "It is your fault"
1995	Just a Greek coffee		1 episode
1995-1996	Absent	Stathis	Lead role / 20 episodes
1996-1998	They and I	Zahos Doganos	Lead role, 58 episodes; also director
1998	Night Report	dentist	2 episodes
1998-1999	Live long and prosper	Nikolas Deligiannis	Lead role, 32 episodes
1999-2000	Aristotelis the Great	Aristotelis Aristotelous	Lead role, 32 episodes; also director
2001	Red Cycle	Mihalis Hatzis	Episode: "Crown Letters"
2001-2002	The pampered children	Kimon Apostolidis	Lead role, 18 episodes
2001-2002	The three widows		Lead role, 22 episodes
2001-2003	Very Family Friendly	Alexandros Theotokatos	Lead role, 48 episodes
2002	My sweetest lie	Aristeidis Mamaloukos	1 episode
2003-2004	Wedding List	Giannis Dimitropoulos	Lead role, 20 episodes
2004-2005	The Knives	Themistoklis Makris	Lead role, 26 episodes
2005	A wedding with everything	Ilias	Episodes: "Nothing upright"
2006	Seven deadly mothers-in-law	Makis Beretas	Episodes: "The Spoiled Mother-in-law"
2006-2007	He came and tied	Giorgos Leventis	Lead role, 28 episodes
2007	With you		1 episode
2007	Honorable Cuckolds	Alkis	Episode: "The hypochondrium cuckold"
2007-2009	Happy Together	Dionysis Mavrotsoukalos	Lead role, 60 episodes
2008	Black Midnight	Aristotelis Tsaparas	1 episode
2009	Happy Together - The Movie	Dionysis Mavrotsoukalos	TV movie
2010	The marriage of my daughter	Giannis Lazos	TV movie
2010-2011	No if you receive more than the one who doesn't have	Saint Petros (voice)	3 episodes
2011-2012	Clinical Case	Markos Staikos	Lead role, 18 episodes
2013-2014	Emma's Home	Arhontis Paxinos	Lead role, 21 episodes
2014	Through This	Kostas	Episode: "The widow and her tail"
2015	Justification	Tilemahos Triantafyllou	10 episodes
2015	Don't drive me crazy	Sokrates	TV-mini series
2016	Your Family	Polyvios Delakourtis	Episode: "Hangover"
2016-2017	Talking about theatre	Himself (host)	Talk show; also director
2018-2020	Throw the fryer away	Andreas Baskias	Lead role, 114 episodes
2019	Life in the grave	general Balafaras	Lead role, 13 episodes
2020-2021	Present	Eleftherios Goulas	Lead role, 60 episodes; also director
2021-2022	In foreign hands	Haralabos Fegoudis	Lead role, 157 episodes
2022	The Numbers	Ntinos Sakkaris	Episode: "The Numbers"
2022-2023	Everything I Love with Giannis Bezos	Himself (host)	Music talk show on OPEN
2022-2023	The Other Me: Nemesis	Dorotheos Komninos	8 episodes
2024	Famagusta	Andreas Sekeris	Lead role, 24 episodes
2024-2026	VIP: Good Old Days	Giannis Leroutsos	4 episodes
2026	Super Heroes	Vasilis Metaxas	Lead role, 60 episodes
