= Safe Sex (film) =

- Directed by: Thanasis Papathanasiou; Michalis Reppas
- Written by: Thanasis Papathanasiou; Michalis Reppas
- Starring: Anna Panayiotopoulou; Mina Adamaki; Alexandros Antonopoulos; Mimis Chrisomalis; Christos Efthimiou; Helene Gerasimidou; Vaso Goulielmaki; Haris Gregoropoulos; Kostas Grekas; Pavlos Haikalis; Tasos Halkias; Eleni Kastani; Dimitri Katalifos; Krateros Katsoulis
- Release date: 22 October 1999
- Running time: 100 minutes
- Country: Greece
- Language: Greek

Safe Sex is a 1999 Greek comedy film written and directed by Michalis Reppas and Thanasis Papathanasiou. When the film was released in Greece, it was considered a blockbuster.

== Plot ==
The film features an ensemble cast of Greek actors portraying various characters, each living his own story in modern Greece. Almost every one of the protagonists is interrelated, and all live their own parallel stories which often converge at several points. Several professional actors appear briefly or in non-speaking cameo roles.

As a result, there is no central plot or prominent protagonist who may be singled out. The major theme of the movie is sex and each character's approach to it, portrayed in a comedic way.

== Cast ==
- Anna Panayiotopoulou as Rena Drouga
- Mina Adamaki as Chloe
- Alexandros Antonopoulos as Apostolos Drougas
- Vaso Goulielmaki as Vivy
- Haris Grigoropoulos as Anestis
- Renia Louizidou as Anna
- Spyros Papadopoulos as Fedon
- Evelina Papoulia as Mary
- Tasos Halkias as Antonis
- Viki Koulianou as Veronica
- Arietta Moutousi as Kaiti
- Pavlos Haikalis as Kostas
- Ieroklis Michailidis as Vardousis
- Sperantza Vrana as Roberta
- Andreas Voutsinas as Audition Director
- Tzimis Panousis as Priest
- Mary Stavrakelli as Vera
- Andreas Evaggelatos
- Sofia Kapsabeli
- Lili Tegou
- Zoe Katsatou
