= Mina Adamaki =

Greek actress (1944–2022)

- Μίνα Αδαμάκη
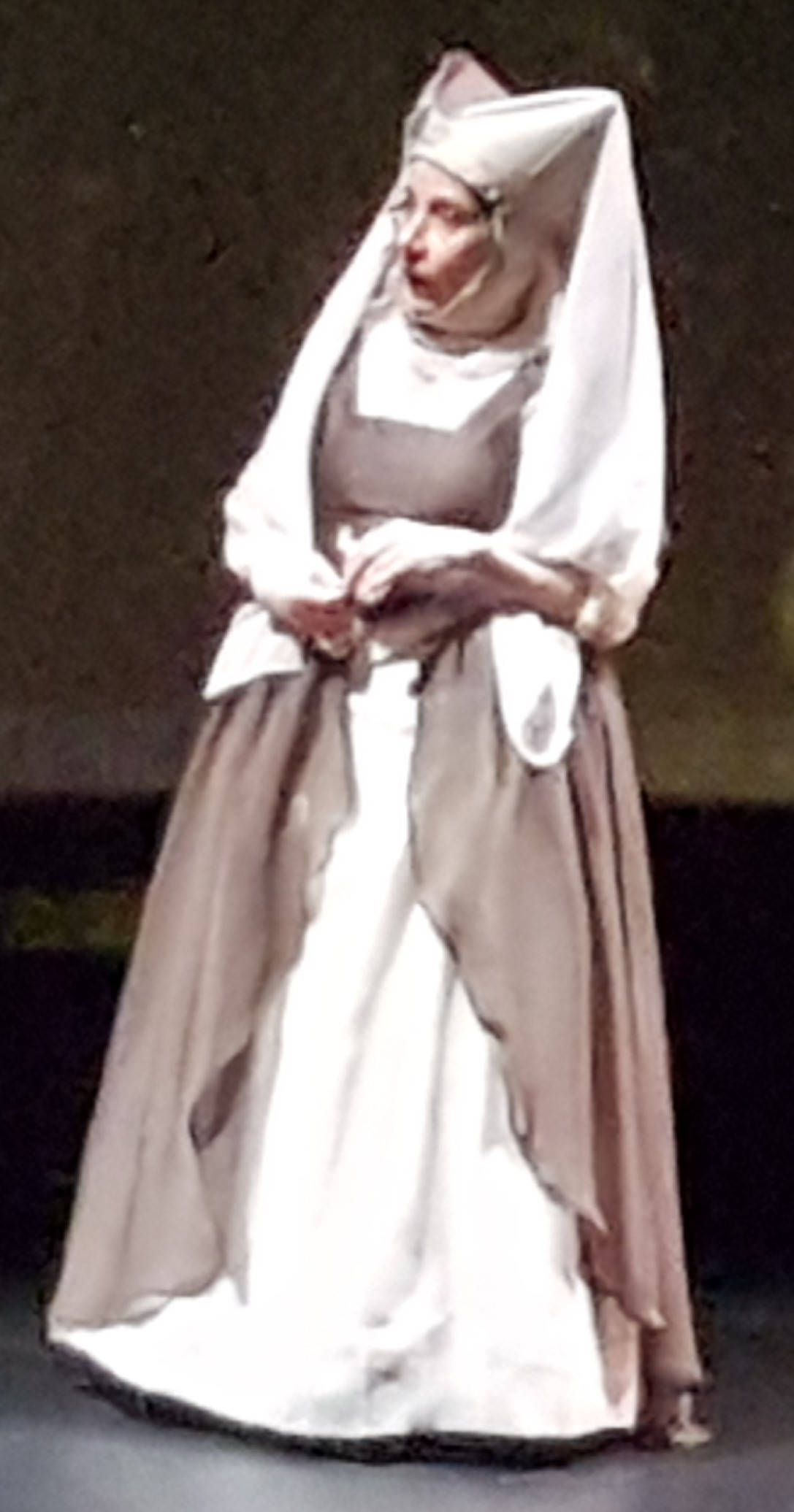
- Adamaki on stage, playing the nanny in Shakespeare in Love (2018)
- Born: 17 July 1944; Volos, Greece
- Died: 11 November 2022 (aged 78); Athens, Greece
- Occupation: Actress

Mina Adamaki (Greek: Μίνα Αδαμάκη; 17 July 1944 – 11 November 2022) was a Greek actress.

== Life and career ==
Born in Volos, Adamaki graduated in law at the University of Athens and then studied acting at the TDrama School of the Karolos Koun Art Theatre. She also followed courses in puppetry and pantomime in London.

After her stage debut at the Art Theatre in Athens, Adamaki worked intensively on television, cinema and theatre. She is best known for her role in the Mega Channel TV-series Oi Treis Harites.

Adamaki died after a long battle with cancer on 11 November 2022, at the age of 78.
