= Ergazomeni gynaika =

- Genre: Comedy
- Created by: Sara Ganoti; Nikos Stavrakoudis; Katerina Filiotou
- Written by: Nikos Stavrakoudis
- Directed by: Katerina Filiotou; Nikos Kritikos
- Starring: Eleni Rantou
- Theme music composer: Vasilis Papakonstantinou
- Country of origin: Greece
- Original language: Greek
- No. of seasons: 2
- No. of episodes: 20

Production
- Producer: Charis Padouvas
- Production locations: Athens, Greece
- Camera setup: Multi-camera
- Running time: 32-38 minutes

Original release
- Network: ANT1
- Release: February 5, 2009 – March 8, 2010

Ergazomeni gynaika (English: The Working Woman) is a comedy television series of standalone episodes that aired on ANT1 from February 5, 2009 to March 8, 2010. Two seasons were aired, with the first consisting of 13 episodes and the second of 7.

== Plot ==
In each standalone episode, Rantou plays a different woman who practices a different profession, and the episode focuses on that and her personal life.

== The professions ==
1st season

- Fast Food
- The Kiosk
- Pita Popi: Part A & B
- The Philologist: Part A & B
- The Editor-in-Chief
- Multinational Executive: Part A & B
- The Insurance Agent
- The Household Assistant
- The Accountant
- The Flight Attendant

2nd season

- The Physiotherapist
- The Funeral Office
- The Realtor
- The Traffic policeman
- The Lawyer
- The Soprano
- The Nurse

== Cast ==
Various Greek actors made appearances in episodes of the series co-starring with Eleni Randou. Some of them are quite recognizable to the general public, while there were also actors who made their first appearance in the series.

- Kostas Apostolidis
- Petros Lagoutis
- Kostas Evripiotis
- Giannis Zouganelis
- Vasilis Charalampopoulos
- Fanis Mouratidis
- Thirio
- Lefteris Eleftheriou
- Vladimiros Kyriakidis
- Gerasimos Gennatas
- Nikos Stagopoulos
- Alexandros Parisis
- Michalis Iatropoulos
- Parthena Chorozidou
- Melpo Kosti
- Irini Koumarianou
- Ntina Michailidou
- Thomais Androutsou
- Vasiliki Troufakou
- Magda Tsangani
- Sofia Panagou
- Ioanna Triantafyllidou
- Sara Ganoti
- Ifigenia Staikou
- Sofi Zanninou
- Katerina Theochari
- Chrysa Ropa
- Kallirroi Myriagkou
- Vicky Protogeraki
- Despina Moirou
- Meni Konstantinidou
- Katiana Balanika
- Tzeni Mpotsi
- Yvonni Maltezou
- Odysseas Papaspiliopoulos
- Sakis Mpoulas
- Takis Spyridakis
- Dimitris Starovas
- Alexandros Antonopoulos
- Kostas Voutsas
- Gerasimos Skiadaresis
- Akis Sakellariou
- Hlias Zervos
- Maximos Moumouris
- Charis Grigoropoulos
- Giannis Tsimitselis
- Antonis Karystinos
- Kostas Kappas
- Orfeas Avgoustidis
- Nikos Orfanos
- Thanasis Efthymiadis
- Spyros Spantidas
- Giorgos Chraniotis
- Christos Mantakas
- Pantelis Kanarakis
- Martha Karagianni
- Anatoli Athanasiadou
- Matina Nikolaou
- Maria Filippou
- Christina Pomoni
- Vivi Kokka
- Galini Tseva
- Georgia Tsagkaraki
- Kaiti Konstantinou
- Menia Anagnostopoulou
- Vivian Kontomari
- Elisavet Konstantinidou
- Konstantia Christoforidou
- Popi Christodoulou
- Alexandra Pantelaki
