= Pavlos Haikalis =

Greek actor and politician

Under Secretary of for Labour and Social Solidarity (Greece)
- In office 18 July 2015 – 27 August 2015
- Preceded by: Dimitris Stratoulis
- Succeeded by: Anastasios Petropoulos

Member of the Hellenic Parliament
- In office 6 May 2012 – 28 August 2015

Personal details
- Born: Pavlos Haikalis; 30 October 1959 (age 66) Katakolo, Elis, Kingdom of Greece
- Party: Independent Greeks
- Spouse: Evdokia Pentzaki (divorced) Margarita Soldatou (divorced) Maria Lykou (divorced)
- Children: Giorgios Haikalis
- Relatives: Thanasis Haikalis (brother)
- Education: Drama School Giorgos Theodosiadis
- Occupation: Actor; voice actor; politician

Military service
- Allegiance: Greece
- Branch/service: Hellenic Army

Pavlos Haikalis (also Chaikalis; Greek: Παύλος Χαϊκάλης; born 30 October 1959) is a Greek actor and politician.

== Biography ==
Pavlos Haikalis was born in Katakolo, Elis, on 30 October 1959. He and his older brother Thanasis Haikalis (1948–2022) were raised by his mother Nikoleta because by the time Pavlos Haikalis was 10 yeard old his father Giorgos Haikalis, who was a travel agent, died. After two years they started the health problems of his mother, he and his brother began working at variety of odd jobs for livelihood. He worked as waiter, labourer and warehouseman at a factory, newsstand kioskman, detective and others.

Thanasis Haikalis was a clerk at the Sivitanidios Public School of Trades and Vocations in Kallithea, Attica, after his retirement was relocated to his origin town of Katakolo, Elis, where was engaged in amateur acting became a member of the local theatre group Trojan Horse (Δούρειος Ίππος). Although his brother died on 11 November 2022, at the same day Pavlos Haikalis acted at the Apollon Theatre in Pyrgos, Elis playing his brother's role on the play The late mother of the lady (Η μακαρίτισσα μητέρα της κυρίας) of the theatre group Trojan Horse.

Pavlos Haikalis relocated in Athens after he was failed at the last grade of gymnasium school (now lyceum school). He studied acting at Athens's Drama School Giorgos Theodosiadis, after actor Ilias Logothetis motivated him to enroll at it. He served his military service at armored forces on the borders of Greece. Nearly the end of his military service, he was invited by the drama school to act to the theatrical play End of the Journey (Τέλος του ταξιδιού) at the Amiral Theatre, in Athens, with actors Aggelos Antonopoulos and Danis Katranidis. Later he was acted at the play Our Person (Δικό μας άνθρωπο) with Lakis Komninos and Eleni Erimou.

His acting career includes many films such as Safe Sex (1999), The Limousine (2013), and TV series such as the ERT2's Androklis and his lions (1985), Mega's Fifty Fifty (2005-2007 and 2010-2011) starring together with Petros Filippidis and Sakis Boulas, Mega's The Block of Flats (2008-2011). Also he performed as a voice actor at the ERT1's puppetry series Froutopia (1985-1988).

In February 2021, Haikalis was accused by 4 women of sexual harassment, and inappropriate behavior. The Hellenic Actors' Union (SEI) at its general session on 10 April 2022 has unanimously decided the lifelong removal of Pavlos Haikalis from its registry of members.

Today Pavlos Haikalis has abandoned the theatre and public life in general, has settled permanently in the city where he was born and deals with astrology.

== Political career ==
From 18 July 2015 until 28 August 2015 he was the Deputy Minister for Labour and Social Solidarity in the coalition government of Alexis Tsipras. From May 2012 until August 2015 Haikalis was a member of the Hellenic Parliament for the Independent Greeks representing the Attica constituency. Before joining the cabinet he was spokesman of his party for social security.

Haikalis has admitted that as a taxpayer he had not declared an invoice of 45.000 euros on his annual income tax declaration, which is being submitted to the Independent Authority for Public Revenue (AADE). In June 2015, Pavlos Haikalis made some xenophobic statements, said «aliens are blame for the growth in crime and unemployment» and «Greek do not become, but you are born».

During the summer of 2015 drew a large amount of media attention because it revealed that Pavlos Haikalis owned an offshore company based in Cyprus since 2008 while as a then Independent Greeks (ANEL) lawmaker of the Hellenic Parliament he did not declare it on his provenance of wealth declaration, also called "pothen esches" (a formal document listing sources of income and assets that is submitted to auditing authorities annually by Greek lawmakers) for which a parliament committee monitors the origin of wealth declaration. Pothen Esches expressly forbids Members of Hellenic Parliament from owning or participating in an offshore company, thus it is incompatible with the holding of a seat as lawmaker of parliament. The Independent Greeks political party was forced to exclude him from their ballot in 2015 parliamentary elections.

== Personal life ==
His first marriage was with actress Evdokia Pentzaki with whom he had one son Giorgos Haikalis (born 1990) from whom he had one grandson (born 2019). His second marriage was with actress Margarita Soldatou. Haikalis was married her third wife police officer Maria Lykou with civil marriage on 6 November 2015 in a ceremony at the Town Hall of Rafina, Attica, but four years later in 2019 they divorced and Haikalis announced that he assumes responsibility.

== Filmography ==
=== Television ===
Year	Title	Role(s)	Notes
1980	Loxandra		Television debut
1980-1981	Drunken city	son	Series regular, 21 episodes
1982	Singers of liberty		1 episode
1984	Our own person	Kraef	Lead role, 13 episodes
1984	Local newspaper		Lead role, 12 episodes
1984	Happy Christmas and Happy Marriage	Himself	TV special
1985	Androklis and his lions	Zaharias	Series regular, 26 episodes
1986	Stories from Kefallonia		1 episode
1985-1988	Froutopia	different voice roles	Recurring role, 24 episodes
1986	Madam Sousou	Vrasidas	2 episodes
1987	Happy New Year is only a wish	civil servant	TV special
1987	Maria Dimadi	Michalis	Series regular, 8 episodes
1987	Swear Please	Ermolaos	Episode: "The victims of Ermolaos"
1987	The tv station of Vaggelitsa	Sakis Klamenos	1 episode
1987-1988	Stories from the box	Sevastianos (voice)	Lead role, 22 episodes
1988	Happy New Pain	Himself	TV special
1988	The siblings		1 episode
1988	Antheon Street	Theocharis	Lead role, 13 episodes
1988	Frames		Recurring role
1988	12 plus 1 wishes for 1989	Himself (co-host)	TV special
1988-1989	Be quiet, our country is sleeping		Series regular, 13 episodes
1989	Who came to our house tonight		Lead role, 8 episodes
1989	The Secret with Kostas Karras	Himself (co-host)	Sunday game show
1989-1990	Inspection, Inspection		Lead role, 13 episodes
1990-1991	The gamester	Andonio	Lead role, 25 episodes
1990-1993	Psarokostoula my darling		Lead role, 190 episodes
1991	Blue Cruise		Lead role, 14 episodes
1991-1992	The judge	Solon	Recurring role
1992	You will talk with my lawyer		1 episode
1992	The Unacceptables		Episode: "Unacceptable New Year's Eve"
1992	Red-Black	Himself (host)	TV special
1992-1993	Crazy housemates	Tasos Tyfoxilos	Lead role, 41 episodes
1992-1994	Wheel of Fortune Greece	Himself (host)	Season 4-5
1992-1998	Ten Little Mitsoi	naughty grandmother / priest Lambros	Lead role, 39 episodes
1993	Harry Clyn Show	Himself	1 episode
1993	The three bodyguards		Recurring role
1993	The Children of Greece	Hercules Pouaeres	Episode: "I'm not a terrorist"
1994	The Good Mother-in-law	Paolo	Lead role, 16 episodes
1994	Anyone with their own needs		Lead role, 13 episodes
1994	Moral Department		Episode: "Exclusively"
1995	Anna Vissi with Love	Himself (co-host)	Variety talk show on ANT1
1995	The bis examarten	Lakis	Episode: "Groom urgently wanted"
1995	One in the morning, other in night	Foivos Tamianopoulos	2 episodes
1996	They and I	Nikitas	Episode: "Hunting job"
1996	Unforgettable comedies	Babis Rentzis	Episode: "Babis and Babinos"
1998-1999	When Harry broke up with Mary		Lead role, 17 episodes
1999	No men anymore	Theocharis	1 episode
1999	Two Strangers	police officer	1 episode
1999-2000	Criss Cross	Thomas	Lead role, 30 episodes
2000	Innocent or Guilty	Miltos Tamiolakis	5 episodes
2000-2001	What Soul Will You Deliver, You Fool Woman?	priest Lambros	Main role, 7 episodes
2001-2004	Under the Acropolis	Babis	Lead role, 250 episodes
2004	Seven Deadly Mothers-In-Law	Giorgos Lorandos	Episode: "The Racist Mother-in-law"
2005-2007	Wedding ring on the right	Theofilos Giantzoglou	Main role, 413 episodes
2005-2011	Fifty Fifty	Mimis Sarantinos	Lead role, 81 episodes
2006-2008	The Red Suit	officer Karantinos	6 episodes
2007-2008	The Cicada and the Ant	Antonis Kavouras	Lead role, 18 episodes
2007-2008	Daddy's Girls	Pavlos Prassas	Lead role, 26 episodes
2008-2011	The Block of Flats	Thanasis Balafoutis	Lead role, 132 episodes
2009	The Secrets of Eden	lawyer	1 episode
2012	My Mother's Sin	priest Nikolaos	1 episode
2013	The Delicatessen Grigoriou	Pavlos Allantopoulos	Lead role, 25 episodes
2013-2014	The Diner	Leonidas Ifantis	Lead role, 38 episodes
2014-2017	The Classmates	Isidoros Nikolaidis	Main role, 433 episodes
2018	Ten Little Mitsoi	naughty grandmother	Lead role, 5 episodes
2018-2019	Free Relationship	Nikos Papakostas	Lead role, 33 episodes
2019-2020	The Block of Flats Mess	Evripidis Papadakis	Lead role, 35 episodes
2021	On my shoes	Giannaros	Recurring role, 30 episodes

=== Film ===
Year	Title	Role(s)	Notes
1981	17 Bullets for an Angel		film debut
1984	Loafing and Camouflage	cook	
1985	Girls for... a bite		
1985	The clever hugman	Fotis	video movie
1985	Without hair and knowledge	Mourmouris	video movie
1986	Raid on the Villa of the Angels		video movie
1986	The virgin hunter	Tony	video movie
1986	The barbarian and Barbara	Thanasis	video movie
1986	Austerity right now	Antonis	video movie
1986	A star is born with caesarian birth		video movie
1986	The Starlet	Gino	video movie
1986	Lovers' branch		video movie
1986	Chasing love		video movie
1987	Absences		
1987	Conjugal short circuits	Agapios	video movie
1987	I need a man	Telemachos	video movie
1987	Nitsa's Revenge	Karamitsos	video movie
1987	A bumpkin with French and piano lessons		video movie
1987	Your death, my life	Vasilis Gkanas	video movie
1987	My friend is a ninja	policeman	video movie
1987	Bonnie and Clyde Greek Edition 1: Robbery for two	Giorgos	video movie
1987	Bonnie and Clyde Greek Edition 2: Chasing the green suitcase	Giorgos	video movie
1987	Hard walnuts and sweet touloumba	Makis Tromaras	video movie
1987	Trip to Bangkok	Sotos Berdesis	video movie
1988	Baptised by crazy priest	Paraskevas	video movie
1988	Zero hour car	Mitsos Theofilou	video movie
1988	My child. Where's my child?		video movie
1988	Psonio, tapi kai... psyhraimos		video movie
1988	Your boy is the best	Sotiris Katsimichas	video movie
1988	Krystallo kid		video movie
1988	The bedchaser	Nodas	video movie
1989	From school to bouzoukia	Fanis Argyriou	video movie
1989	The twin of misfortune	Panagos	video movie
1989	The screw		video movie
1990	The pirate and the Filipina	Giorgos	video movie
1990	The gambler	Antonio	video movie
1999	Safe Sex	Kostas	
2005	Loukoumades with honey	Leonidas	
2005	A marriage, a funer and one woman from Bulgaria	Vasilis	TV movie
2013	The Limousine: A Comedy of Misunderstandings	professore	
2017	The Treasure	Neokopos Cheretakis	
2021	Karditsa Forever	Agis Patrick	
