= To kafe tis Charas =

- Το καφέ της Χαράς
- Created by: Charis Romas; Anna Chatzisofia
- Written by: Charis Romas; Anna Chatzisofia
- Directed by: Kostas Lychnaras(season 1); Takis Michail(season 2-5)
- Starring: Charis Romas; Renia Louizidou; Tzois Eveidi; Gerasimos Skiadaresis
- Opening theme: "Beautiful Eggs" by Spike Jones(2003-2021)
- Ending theme: Vale ena Kafe by Michalis Chatzigiannis(2019-2021)
- Country of origin: Greece
- Original language: Greek
- No. of seasons: 5
- No. of episodes: 131

Production
- Production locations: Karya, Argolis; Kouvaras, Attica; Afidnes, Attica; Plaka; Athens
- Running time: 40-50 minutes
- Production companies: Studio ATA(2003-2006); Pedio Productions(2019-2021)

Original release
- Network: ANT1
- Release: September 26, 2003 – May 6, 2021

To kafe tis Charas (English: Joy's café) is a Greek comedy-drama TV series that broadcast on ANT1 for three seasons from September 2003 to June 2006, before being revived for a fourth and a fifth season since December 2019. The show was originally broadcast at 21:00 local time immediately after ANT1 NEWS, while the fourth season was broadcast on Fridays at 21.45.

Together with Romas' previous show Konstantinou kai Elenis, episodes of the first three seasons of Kafe tis Charas have been re-run almost daily since the end of the show's original run, making it one of the most popular and recognisable shows in the history of Greek television. The show is produced by Kostas Lychnaras and written and directed by Charis Romas and Anna Chatzisofia.

The show stars Charis Romas (who also wrote and starred in Mama Mia, Oi Men Kai Oi Den and Konstantinou kai Elenis) as the ultraconservative mayor of a fictional village in Arcadia, who is obsessed with preventing Chara (lit. Joy) Chaska, an Athenian single mother, played by Renia Louizidou, from opening a café (the eponymous Kafe tis Charas) in his village.

The series also stars Tzois Eveidi, Vasilis Chalakatevakis, Kostas Flokatoulas, Christina Tsafou, Foteini Demiri, Charis Grigoropoulos, Stelios Goutis, Rania Ioannidou, Sofia Moutidou, Periklis Lianos, Dimitris Tsakalas, Chara Ismirou, Dimitrios Macheras and Giannis Papathanasis.

Reruns of Kafe tis Charas were one of the first Greek programs to air with closed captioning for the hearing impaired. In August 2018, Haris Romas announced that "To Kafe tis Charas" will return for a 4th Season in 2020.

The new season premiered on New Year's Eve of 2019 to record ratings, and it ended on December 11, 2020.The success of 4th season lead to the production of one more season which premiered on January 15, 2021 and it consists of 20 episodes. The 5th season is the last season of the series.

== Opening sequence ==
The instrumental opening of "Beautiful Eggs" by Spike Jones serves as the opening and closing theme song in Seasons 1-3 and as the opening theme as of Season 4.

The original opening credits show photos of the cast as children inside children's drawings of the village's buildings (the town hall, Chara's cafe, the bakery etc.), while a drawing of a hot air balloon flies above. The Season 4 opening credits feature the same children's drawings (without the childhood photographs), transforming one by one into updated 3D cartoon renderings, with exception of Chara's cafe, which is shown burning down (reflecting the fourth season's central plot point).

For the show's return in 2019, a new closing theme called "Put on a coffee" (Βάλε ενά καφέ), was recorded by Michalis Hatzigiannis, with lyrics by Haris Romas, and was a released as a single to coincide with the premiere of Season 4.

== Plot ==
The story begins in Athens, with Chara Chaska, a single mother who works at an advertising agency. When her boyfriend and fellow co-worker steals her ideas for a campaign and gets promoted instead of her, she decides to quit her job and move with her 10-year-old daughter Valia (Effie Rassia) to the remote mountain village of Kolokotronitsi (named after Theodoros Kolokotronis), in Arcadia, where she has just inherited some property.

Chara's hopes for a peaceful life away from the cutthroat environment of the big city are quickly dashed when she meets the village's traditionalist and misogynist mayor Periandros Popotas, who has a pathological hatred of everything "modern" and views the very presence of an Athenian woman with an illegitimate child in his village as a threat to his idyllic community's motto of "Order and Morality". A British-educated folklorist with a mysterious past, Periandros lives with his ten-year-old son Emmanouil, who develops a crush on Valia, and their housekeeper Tasia.

Popotas is particularly outraged at Chara's plans to open a modern cafeteria and rallies the villagers to boycott her.

The first season focuses on Chara's struggle to open her café against Periandros' machinations and follows her slowly winning the villagers over to her side, culminating in her attempt to unseat Popotas at municipal elections in the penultimate episode. The second season explores the protagonists' backstories, through the arrival in the village of various characters from their past. The third season has Chara and Periandros develop feelings for each other, and follows their doomed efforts to find a way to live together despite their deeply contrasting beliefs. Season 4, set 14 years after the third season's cliffhanger ending, follows a now adult Valia returning to the village to investigate the cafés destruction in a mysterious fire.

Other characters include Periandros' sister, Stavroula, her adulterous, lazy and linguistically challenged husband, Vangellis, who as the village's coffee house owner is also Chara's main competitor, the village idiot Trelantonis whom Chara takes in, the bakers, Lefteris and Kanella, who have a long-running feud with the greengrocers, Tasos and Chaido over a fig tree (only to have their feud resolved when their children, Billy and Gogo get together and eventually marry), the village's priest Papa-Triantafyllos and his gossiping wife Marika and Aglaia, the wacky teacher who is madly in love with Periandros and fantasizes about marrying him.

=== About the village ===
The village features a square where its bakery, its greengrocers, its primary school and the city hall are all located. A number of neighboring villages are also mentioned many times in the series: Megalochori, the biggest village of the region, Ano and Kato Kremasta and Pera Rachoula.

== Trivia ==
- The fictional village of Kolokotronitsi is portrayed by Karia village in Argolis in the Peloponnese
- Efi Rassia, the actress who plays Chara's daughter Valia, is the niece of protagonist Haris Romas in real-life
- The scenes for the café were in fact shot in Kallithea, Athens
- The actor who plays Trelantonis, Charis Grigoropoulos is actually married to Foteini Demiri that plays Kanela

== Music ==
The show features an eclectic soundtrack which makes heavy use of tracks from classic movies, as well as mid-20th century Greek and foreign hits and classical music. Alan Silvestri, Joaquin Rodrigo and Jon Brion play a lot through the series. For example, in a scene where Aglaia performs voodoo, in order to make Periandros fall in love with her, Halloween theme song plays in the background. A number of songs were also composed and recorded by various prominent Greek artists especially for the series, with lyrics written by Haris Romas.

== Cast ==
Character	Cast
Mayor Periandros Popotas	Charis Romas
Chara Chaska	Renia Louizidou
Stavroula Popota-Fatsea	Tzois Eveidi
Vaggelis Fatseas	Gerasimos Skiadaresis
Trelantonis	Charis Grigoropoulos
Kanela Poulopoulou	Foteini Demiri
Lefteris Poulopoulos	Vasilis Chalakatevakis
Chaido Polymenea	Christina Tsafou
Tasos Polymenas	Kostas Flokatoulas
Marika Papadia	Rania Ioannidou
Papa-Triandafyllos	Stelios Goutis
Aglaia (Teacher)	Sofia Moutidou
Theodoros (Mayor's Assistant)	Periklis Lianos
Tasia	Maria Kanellopoulou
Matoula	Chara Smyrou
Billy Polymeneas	Dimitris Tsakalas
Dionysis	Dimitris Machairas
Emmanouil Popotas	Paris Skartsolias
Valia Chaska	Efi Rasia
