= Zamanfou =

Zamanfou (Greek: ζαμανφού), also known as ochaderfismos (ωχαδερφισμός), is a widely accepted as prevalent attitude/approach to life in Greece that is nevertheless classed by some as a counterculture phenomenon, which involves social loafing as its principal characteristic.

The term is derived from the French phrase je m'en fous ("I don't give a damn"); the expression became known to Greeks before World War II, when French was the most common foreign language in Greece. The associated term ochaderfismos derives from the Greek phrase for "oh brother!" (ωχ αδερφέ!, och aderfé!).

== In popular culture ==
- "Zamanfou" is the title of a Greek song by Sakis Boulas, which has also been recorded in a hip-hop version by rapper Taraxias (featuring Boulas and Vasia Patrikarea).
- "Zamanfou" is the title of a Greek hip-hop song by rapper Eisvoleas.
- Zamanfou was the title of a Greek TV show by Annita Pania.

== See also ==
- Social loafing
- Nihilism
- Cynicism
- Ethical egoism
- Apathy
