= Peninta Peninta =

- Genre: Comedy
- Written by: Vasilis Risvas Dimitra Sakali; Elena Solomou
- Directed by: Vasilis Thomopoulos
- Starring: Petros Filippidis; Pavlos Haikalis; Sakis Boulas; Ava Galanopoulou; Vana Rambota; Maria Androutsou
- Theme music composer: Paul Anka
- Opening theme: Adam and Eve by Paul Anka
- Country of origin: Greece
- Original language: Greek
- No. of seasons: 3
- No. of episodes: 81 + 1 movie

Production
- Production locations: Athens, Greece
- Running time: 45-50 minutes
- Production company: ANOSI A.E.

Original release
- Network: Mega Channel
- Release: September 30, 2005 – June 15, 2011

Peninta Peninta (English: Fifty-Fifty) is a Greek television series that was first aired from 2005 to 2007 by Mega Channel. Owing to its success, the series returned the 2010–11 season with 15 new episodes. The series stars Petros Filippidis, Pavlos Haikalis, Sakis Boulas and others. It won two television awards in 2007, for the best actor (Petros Filippidis) and the best supporting actor (Pygmalion Dadakaridis).

On January 13, 2010, a TV movie of the series titled The Big Feast was broadcast, which is set after the end of the second season and was also dedicated to the 20th anniversary of Mega Channel. Its popularity led the station to release a new season of episodes in the 2010–2011 season. The station was also planning a fourth season, but due to the station's financial difficulties, the plan was shelved.

== Plot ==
The series tells the story of the lives of three couples: Nikiforos and Elisavet (or Veta as Nikiforos used to call her), Mimis and Xanthippi, Pavlos and Irini. The seemingly peaceful life of the group is gradually disturbed by Pavlos' extramarital affair with the young gymnast, Maria, the relationship of Natalia (daughter of Nikiforos and Elisavet) with Achilleas, and the relationship of Kimon (son of Mimis) with the cynical Vivian, who makes him her subordinate in order to inherit her father-in-law's fortune.

== Cast ==
=== Main ===
- Petros Filippidis as Nikiforos Zormpas
- Pavlos Haikalis as Dimitris "Mimis" Sarantinos
- Sakis Boulas as Pavlos "Pavlitos" Strateas
- Ava Galanopoulou as Elisavet "Veta" Dimaki
- Vana Rambota as Irirni Karampeti
- Maria Androutsou as Xanthippi Alevizou
- Pigmalion Dadakaridis as Kimon Sarantinos
- Nikoleta Karra as Maria Papadopopulou
- Sofia Panagou as Natalia Zormpa
- Thanos Tokakis as Achilleas Linardos
- Foteini Tsakiri as Vivian Sarantinou

=== Special guest appearances ===
- Alkis Panagiotidis as Alkiviadis "Adis" Mpeloutsis
- Kostas Triantafyllopoulos as Ippokratis Mpeloutsis
- Michael Giannatos as Turkish prison guard
- Giannis Aivazis as Policeman Stefanos
- Tasos Kostis as Thanasis Papadopoulos
- Christos Mantakas as Giannis Metaxakis
- Krateros Katsoulis as Asimakis Mpaltas
