= Kostas Triantafyllopoulos =

Greek actor (1956–2021)

- Κώστας Τριανταφυλλόπουλος
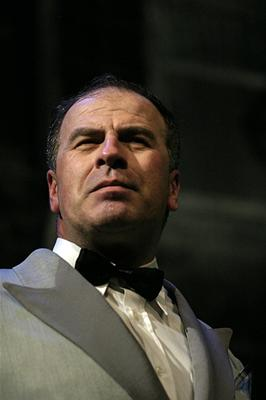
- Triantafyllopoulos as Joe Keller in Arthur Miller's All My Sons (National Theatre of Northern Greece, 2006)
- Born: 8 February 1956; Athinaio, Arcadia, Greece
- Died: 21 August 2021 (aged 65); Athens, Greece
- Occupation: Actor
- Years active: 1976–2021

Kostas Triantafyllopoulos (Greek: Κώστας Τριανταφυλλόπουλος; 8 February 1956 – 21 August 2021) was a Greek actor. Οne of the most prominent actors of his generation, Triantafyllopoulos had a notable career in Greek theatre, performing a wide range of important roles across many different theatrical genres.

== Biography ==
In a career spanning over four and a half decades, Triantafyllopoulos graduated from Theodosiadis Drama School of Athens in 1977 and went on to perform a wide variety of roles on stage from Greek tragedy, Aristophanes and Shakespeare to contemporary American drama (Eugene O'Neill, Arthur Miller, Tennessee Williams, Joyce Carol Oates, Thornton Wilder, Sam Shepard).

He performed frequently at the National Theatre of Greece, the National Theatre of Northern Greece and at many other major Greek theatres, appearing in both classics and new works. His most notable stage roles include: Joe Keller in All My Sons by Arthur Miller, Kilroy in Camino Real by Tennessee Williams, Erie Smith in Hughie by Eugene O'Neill, Frank Gulick in Tone Clusters by Joyce Carol Oates, Juror #3 in 12 Angry Men by Reginald Rose, Old Man in Fool for Love by Sam Shepard, Joseph Garcin in No Exit by Jean-Paul Sartre, Launce in The Two Gentlemen of Verona by William Shakespeare, Cardinal in The Duchess of Malfi by John Webster, Gilbert Horn in Knives in Hens by David Harrower, Creon in Oedipus at Colonus by Sophocles, Xanthias in The Frogs and Lamachus in The Acharnians both by Aristophanes.

From November 1998 to July 1999 and from July 2002 to March 2003 he participated in the world tours of the National Theatre of Greece with the tragedies Medea by Euripides (as Creon), Electra (as Paedagogus) and Antigone (as Guard) both by Sophocles. The tour included performances in France, Australia, Israel, Portugal, United States, Canada, Brasil, Germany, Italy, Cyprus, Denmark, Turkey, Bulgaria, China and Japan. Medea was well received by the critics and especially by The New York Times.

He appeared in numerous Greek television series and films, such as Ela sti thesi mou, Ta mystika tis Edem, Kaneis de leei s' agapo, Peninta Peninta and Symmathites. He had also established himself as a voice actor, performing the Greek dubbing voices of numerous popular Disney characters such as Pete of the Mickey Mouse universe, Tigger in Winnie the Pooh, Mr. Potato Head in Toy Story, Don Carlton in Monsters University, Cogsworth in the Beauty and the Beast, Django in Ratatouille and Dr. Jumba Jookiba in Lilo & Stitch.

== Death ==
He died on 20 August 2021 at the age of 65, following a four-month battle with cancer. News of his death became known on the morning of 21 August 2021 and caused widespread grief in the Greek artistic community. Tributes were published in the country’s major media outlets, followed by hundreds of posts on social media, through which colleagues and fans publicly expressed their sorrow, highlighting his artistic stature, acting talent, character, integrity, and contribution to Greek theatre.

The Minister of Culture of Greece, Lina Mendoni, paid tribute to Triantafyllopoulos in an official statement, noting: “With a presence and a voice that conveyed familiarity, Kostas Triantafyllopoulos served for decades, with his talent and education, Greek theatre, cinema, and television. A versatile and adaptable actor who worked across all forms of theatrical expression, he was among those essential to the success of a production, in every aspect of acting. From ancient tragedy to the dubbing of animated films, he demonstrated the same professionalism, consistency, and effectiveness. Loved and respected by all his colleagues, Kostas Triantafyllopoulos will be greatly missed by Greek theatre.”

A further statement was issued by the Spokesperson for Cultural Affairs of Syriza, Greece's main opposition party, Sia Anagnostopoulou, who stated: “One of the most significant artists of his generation, Kostas Triantafyllopoulos brought both his talent and his extensive theatrical experience to the stage, as well as to film, television and dubbing, always with the same dedication and professionalism. Those who worked with him speak of a modest, gentle and devoted artist. My sincere condolences to his family, friends and colleagues.”

The National Theatre of Greece, with which Triantafyllopoulos was closely associated over many years, also paid tribute in an official statement, noting: “With deep sorrow we bid farewell to an actor who earned wide recognition and genuine affection, securing a special place in the hearts of audiences through both his remarkable talent, which enabled him to move with ease across all aspects of his art, and his distinctive personality, reflected in the integrity and the dignity of his presence. Throughout his long career, Kostas Triantafyllopoulos served theatre, television and cinema with equal dedication, performing a wide range of roles in notable productions that will be remembered, including at the National Theatre of Greece over several decades.”

== Work ==
=== Theatre (partial) ===
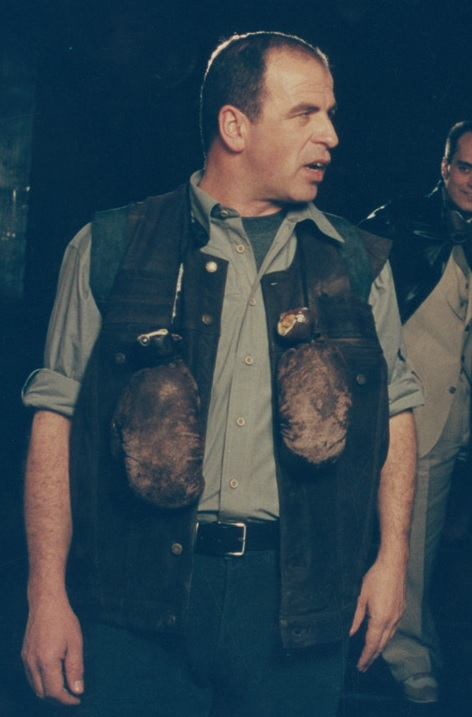
Triantafyllopoulos as Kilroy in Camino Real by Tennessee Williams in the National Theatre of Greece (2001)

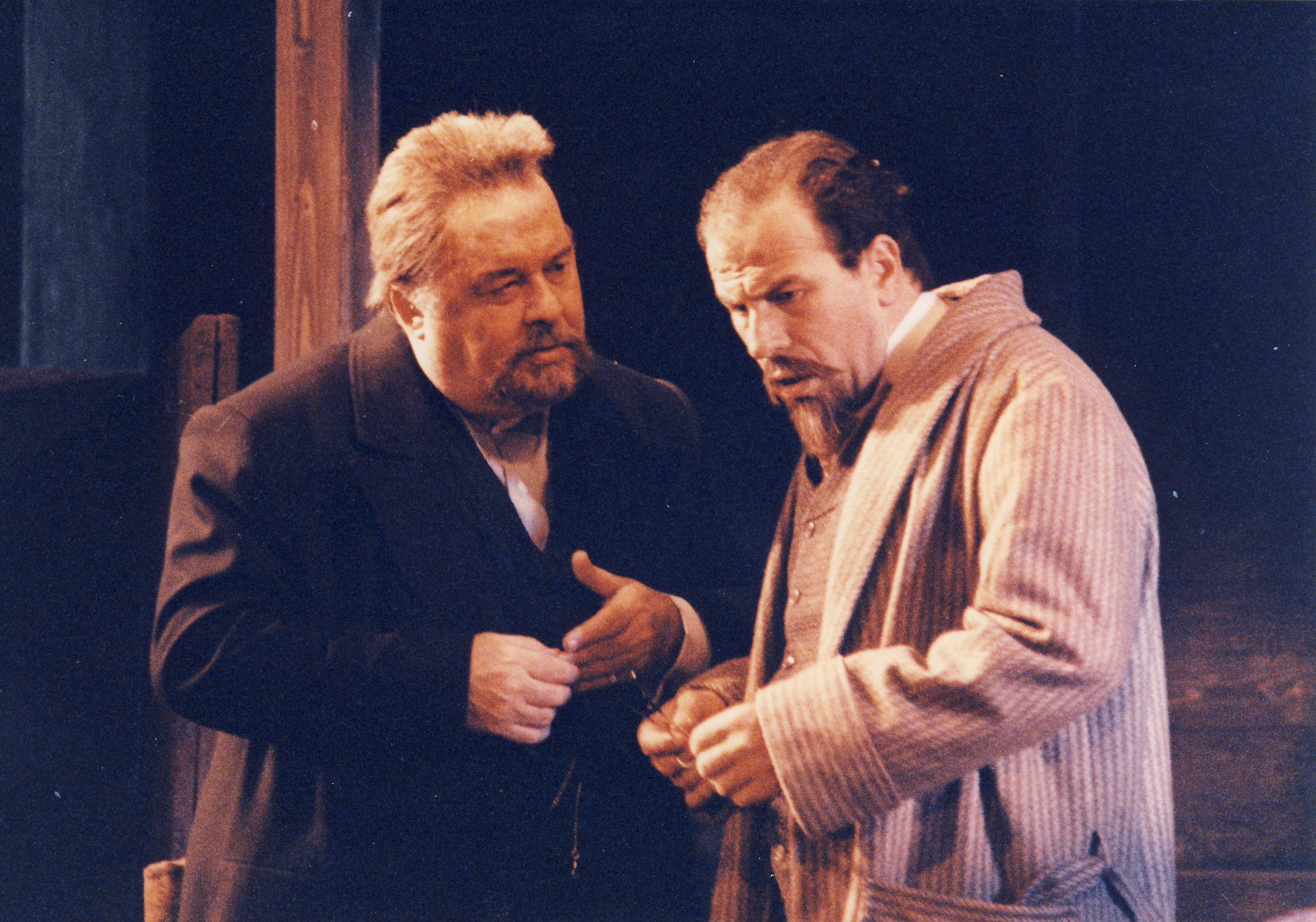
Dimitris Papamichael (Ivan) and Triantafyllopoulos (Yakov) in The Last Ones (Athens, Porta Theatre, 1995)

Year	Play	Writer	Role	Theatre
2019–20	Medea	Bost	Oedipus	Thiseio Theatre
2017–19	The Lying Kind	Anthony Neilson	Balthasar	Mousouri Theatre
2016–17	Schumann	Sofia Kapsourou	Friedrich Wieck	National Theatre of Greece
2015–16	To Panigiri	Dimitris Kechaidis	Paplomatas	National Theatre of Greece
2014–15	12 Angry Men	Reginald Rose	Juror #3	Alkmini Theatre
2014–15	Protipos oikos anochis	Haris Romas	Alkiviadis/Aristomenis Lachanas	Akadimos Theatre
2013–14	A Flea in Her Ear	Georges Feydeau	Augustin Ferraillon	Aliki Theatre
2013	Ears on a Beatle	Mark St. Germain	Howard Ballantine	Aggelon Vima Theatre
2011–12	Stallerhof	Franz Xaver Kroetz	Staller	Neos Kosmos Theatre
2010–11	Fool for Love	Sam Shepard	Old Man	Kappa Theatre
2009–10	Hughie	Eugene O'Neill	Erie Smith	Altera Pars
2008–09	Eldorado	Marius von Mayenburg	Aschenbrenner	Hora Theatre
2008–09	Hughie	Eugene O'Neill	Erie Smith	Bios
2006–08	I theia ap' to Chicago	Alekos Sakellarios	Harilaos	Ivi Theatre
2005–06	All My Sons	Arthur Miller	Joe Keller	National Theatre of Northern Greece
2005	Tone Clusters	Joyce Carol Oates	Frank Gulick	Porta Theater
2004–05	Pugilist Specialist	Adriano Shaplin	Colonel Johns	Kefallinias Street Theatre
2003	Oedipus at Colonus	Sophocles	Creon	Greek Art Theatre
2002–03	Antigone	Sophocles	Guard	National Theatre of Greece
2001–02	No Exit	Jean-Paul Sartre	Joseph Garcin	Kefallinias Street Theatre
2001	Oresteia	Aeschylus	Herald	National Theatre of Greece
2000–01	Camino Real	Tennessee Williams	Kilroy	National Theatre of Greece
1999–00	Knives in Hens	David Harrower	Gilbert Horn	Athens Praxi Theatre
1999	Doña Rosita	Federico García Lorca	Uncle	National Theatre of Greece
1998–99	Electra	Sophocles	Paedagogus	National Theatre of Greece
1997–99	Medea	Euripides	Creon	National Theatre of Greece
1997	La Celestina	Fernando de Rojas	Sempronio	Odeon of Herodes Atticus
1996–97	The Duchess of Malfi	John Webster	Cardinal	Amore Theatre
1996–97	Thérèse Raquin	Émile Zola	Grivet	Amore Theatre
1996	Othello	William Shakespeare	Roderigo	University of Athens
1995–96	The Government Inspector	Nikolai Gogol	Artemy Filippovich Zemlianika	Tzeni Karezi Theatre
1995	The Acharnians	Aristophanes	Lamachus	National Theatre of Greece
1994–95	The Last Ones	Maxim Gorky	Yakov	Porta Theater
1994	The Two Gentlemen of Verona	William Shakespeare	Launce	Theatre of Central Greece (Lamia)
1992–94	The Diary of Anne Frank	Frances Goodrich – Albert Hackett	Mr. Van Daan	Kappa Theatre
1990	The Frogs	Aristophanes	Xanthias	Open Theatre
1989–90	Three Sisters	Anton Chekhov	Baron Nikolai Lvovich Tuzenbach	Open Theatre
1988–89	Lulu	Frank Wedekind	Rodrigo	Open Theatre

=== Filmography ===
==== Television (partial) ====
Year	Series	Role	Network
2020–21	Ι familia	Manos	ANT1
2019	Ou foneuseis "Stachtes"	Dimitris	Open TV
2018–19	Ela sti thesi mou	Loukas Pasamitros	Alpha
2015–16	Symmathites	Androklis Nikolaidis	ANT1
2014	Me ta pantelonia katw	Gerasimos	MEGA
2011	Ta mystika tis Edem	Eukleidis Fokas	MEGA
2009	Epta thanasimes petheres	Thanasis Karamitros	MEGA
2008–09	I katallili stigmi	Thodoros Mikromaniatis	ΝΕΤ
2008	Safe sex TV Stories	Vangelis	MEGA
2007–08	Amyna zonis	Brigadier General Aristides Gikas	ΝΕΤ
2007	Epta thanasimes petheres	Paraskevas Kollias	MEGA
2007	Irthe ki edese	Dionysis Stamoulis	MEGA
2007	Super babas	Kostis	ANT1
2006–07	Peninta Peninta	Ippokratis Beloutsis	MEGA
2006	Safe sex TV Stories	Stelios Provatas	MEGA
2004–05	Kaneis de leei s' agapo	Stefanos Triantafyllou	MEGA
2004	Babalou	Zisis	Alpha
2003–04	Mia agapi, mia zoi	Giorgos	Alpha
2003	O dromos	Dimitris	MEGA
2002–03	Fevga	Pantelis	MEGA
2001–02	Drosoulites	Karolos Karolou	Star Channel
2000–01	Taksim	Antonis	ΕΤ1
2000	Na me proseheis	Sokratis	MEGA
1994–95	To teleftaio antio	Dimitris Kosmatos	MEGA
1994	Tavros me toxoti	Vangelis	ANT1
1992–93	Oi frouroi tis Achaias	Giannis Filinis	MEGA
1991–92	Ypografi Priftis	Notis Agorogiannis	ANT1
1990–91	Akrivi mou Sofia	Constantine I of Greece	ET1
1990	I Anagenisi enos Ethnous	Captain Dioskouridis	ΕΤ2
1990	Jean-Paul Sartre's The Unburied Dead	Canoris	ΕΤ1

==== Film (partial) ====
Year	Movie	Role
2011	Ap' ta kokkala vgalmena	Manolis Padouvakis
2009	Nisos	Inspector Athanasiou
2006	Paperboat	Father
2005	I gynaika einai... skliros anthropos	Detective Karabeos
2002	Avrio tha 'nai arga	Boss
2001	Ki avrio mera einai	Iordanis

==== Dubbing (partial) ====
- Mickey Mouse TV series and films ... Pete
- ThunderCats ... Mumm-Ra
- The Transformers ... Optimus Prime
- Toy Story films ... Mr. Potato Head
- Winnie the Pooh films and TV series ... Tigger
- Monsters University ... Don Carlton
- Beauty and the Beast ... Cogsworth
- Lilo & Stitch films and TV series ... Dr. Jumba Jookiba
- A Bug's Life ... Heimlich
- Alpha and Omega ... Tony
- Sammy's Adventures: The Secret Passage ... Slim
- Shark Bait ... Jack
- Aladdin ... Fruit Shop Merchant
- Hercules ... Nessus, Cyclops
- The Hunchback of Notre Dame ... Additional voices
- Mulan ... Additional voices
- Happy Feet ... Additional voices
