= Cyprus in the Eurovision Song Contest 1984 =

- Eurovision Song Contest 1984
- Participating broadcaster: Cyprus Broadcasting Corporation (CyBC)
- Country: Cyprus
- Selection process: National final
- Selection date: 26 February 1984

Competing entry
- Song: "Anna Mari-Elena"
- Artist: Andy Paul
- Songwriter: Andreas Pavlou

Placement
- Final result: 15th, 31 points

Participation chronology

Cyprus was represented at the Eurovision Song Contest 1984 with the song "Anna Mari-Elena", written and performed by Andy Paul. The Cypriot participating broadcaster, the Cyprus Broadcasting Corporation (CyBC), selected its entry through a national final.

== Before Eurovision ==
=== National final ===
==== Competing entries ====
The Cyprus Broadcasting Corporation (CyBC) opened a submission period for Cypriot artists and composers to submit songs until 28 January 1984. Forty submissions were received, of which three were revealed to be invalid during the initial presentation of the songs. Two of the invalid submissions were theatrical works, and the other had plagiarised lyrics.

==== Format ====
The national final was held on 26 February 1984 at the Filoxenia Hotel in Nicosia and was hosted by Pavlos Pavlou. The results were decided by a 154-member jury consisting of 46 professionals from the press and other organisations, and 108 members of the public. Members of the public who wished to participate in the jury had to be Cypriot nationals over the age of 16, and had between 12 February and 16 February 1984 to apply. Over a thousand people applied to become a jury member and the 108 jury members were drawn at random on 20 February 1984 at the CyBC buildings.

The competition was done in four stages and lasted the entire day, from around 10:00 EET until 22:00 EET. In the first stage, the submitted recordings of all forty songs were presented twice and each jury member chose their ten favourite songs, after which the votes were collected and the ten songs with the highest number of votes progressed to the second stage. The ten songs were presented again and were then whittled down to four songs, and from those four songs, two were chosen. The winner was chosen out of the final two songs, where each jury gave one vote to their favourite song, and the runner-up was kept as a back-up entry in the case the winning song could not go to the Eurovision Song Contest. The last part of the competition, with the final four songs, was broadcast on TV and radio live.

Second Round - 26 February 1984
R/O	Artist	Song	Songwriter(s)	Result
2	Andy Paul	"Anna Mari-Elena" (Άννα Μαρί-Ελένα)	Andreas Pavlou	Qualified
6	Nikki Vissi	"Htes" (Χτες)	Anna Vissi; Lia Vissi	Qualified
14				—N/a
17				—N/a
23				—N/a
26				—N/a
30	Yiannis Demetriou	"Thimame (san to rok ent rol)" (Θυμάμαι (σαν το ροκ εντ ρολ))	John Vickers; Aristos Moschovakis	Qualified
35				—N/a
36				—N/a
39	Jimmy Makulis	"Triantafila tou Mai" (Τριαντάφυλλα του Μάη)	Jimmy Makulis	Qualified

Third Round - 26 February 1984
R/O	Artist	Song	Points	Place	Result
2	Andy Paul	"Anna Mari-Elena" (Άννα Μαρί-Ελένα)	124	1	Qualified
6	Nikki Vissi	"Htes" (Χτες)	103	2	Qualified
30	Yiannis Demetriou	"Thimame (san to rok ent rol)" (Θυμάμαι (σαν το ροκ εντ ρολ))	43	3	—N/a
39	Jimmy Makulis	"Triantafila tou Mai" (Τριαντάφυλλα του Μάη)	36	4	—N/a

Fourth & Final Round - 26 February 1984
Artist	Song	Points	Place
Andy Paul	"Anna Mari-Elena" (Άννα Μαρί-Ελένα)	97	1
Nikki Vissi	"Htes" (Χτες)	57	2

== At Eurovision ==
On the night of the final Paul performed seventh in the running order, following United Kingdom and preceding Belgium. At the close of voting "Anna Maria Lena" had received 31 points, placing Cyprus 15th of the 19 entries. The Cypriot jury awarded its 12 points to Sweden.

=== Voting ===
Points awarded to Cyprus
Score	Country
12 points	Yugoslavia
10 points	Denmark
8 points	
7 points	
6 points	
5 points	
4 points	Ireland; Sweden
3 points	
2 points	
1 point	France

Points awarded by Cyprus
Score	Country
12 points	Sweden
10 points	Ireland
8 points	Yugoslavia
7 points	Luxembourg
6 points	Spain
5 points	Denmark
4 points	Finland
3 points	France
2 points	United Kingdom
1 point	Switzerland
