= Apartment in Athens =

2012 drama film

- Directed by: Ruggero Dipaola
- Screenplay by: Heidrun Schleef; Luca De Benedittis; Ruggero Dipaola
- Produced by: Ruggero Dipaola
- Starring: Richard Sammel; Gerasimos Skiadaresis; Laura Morante
- Cinematography: Vladan Radovic
- Edited by: Roberto Missiroli
- Music by: Enzo Pietropaoli
- Release date: 2011
- Language: Italian

Apartment in Athens (Italian: Appartamento ad Atene) is a 2011 Italian war drama film produced, co-written and directed by Ruggero Dipaola, in his feature film debut. It is an adaptation of the 1945 novel of the same name by Glenway Wescott.

== Plot ==
The Helianos are a family living during the Nazi occupation of Greece. They receive a visit from Captain Kalter, an arrogant German Wehrmacht officer looking for an apartment to live in. Kalter requisitions the best room and forces the couple—who had previously lost a son in the Battle of Olympus—to make do with a rickety cot in the kitchen. Their two surviving children, who still live at home, are deeply scarred by the war and the occupation: young Alex, malnourished and seething with hatred toward the Nazis, is constantly at risk of being beaten by Kalter; meanwhile, Leda—a slightly developmentally disabled and withdrawn girl—develops a peculiar soft spot for the German officer. Although Kalter remains convinced of the absolute superiority of the German race, Helianos begins to develop a sort of admiration for him. The Greek man is too absorbed in his own complex and grandiose ideas to realize the danger he is in. Upon returning from a leave in Germany utterly devastated—having simultaneously lost his wife and two children—Kalter’s attitude toward his host family undergoes a profound shift. He rejects his own daughter’s affection but offers a few kinder words to the Helianos; he even goes so far as to converse with Helianos and share the details of his personal tragedy, until the Greek man makes a fatal misstep, letting slip a remark that implicitly blames the Führer and Mussolini for the deaths of the young. The situation immediately spirals out of control; Kalter reverts to the brutal monster he once was. He denounces Helianos to the authorities and, moments later—overcome by depression—commits suicide. However, in his suicide note, he attempts to pin the responsibility for his death on Helianos’s wife, thereby seeking to utterly destroy the very family that had taken him in.

== Cast ==
- Richard Sammel as Captain Kalter
- Gerasimos Skiadaresis as Nicolas Heliamos
- Laura Morante as Zoe Helianos
- Alba De Torrebruna as Leda
- Vincenzo Crea as Alex
- Peter Boom as Major Von Roesch

== Production ==
The film was shot in 2010; the apartment interiors were reconstructed at Cinecittà, while the exteriors were filmed in Gravina in Puglia—with the historic center transformed into Athens' Plaka district—and at the edge of the ravine and within the Alta Murgia National Park.

== Reception ==
Variety's film critic Dennis Harvey described the film as "a decent, well-acted drama that ably holds attention yet misses the chance to become something truly memorable".

The film won the awards for Best feature, Best actor (Gerasimos Skiadaresis), Best screenplay and Best cinematography at the 13th Newport Beach Film Festival, and the world cinema section awards for Best picture and Best director at the 12th Phoenix Film Festival. It was nominated at the David di Donatello awards for Best costumes (Alessandro Lai), and for Nastro d'Argento for Best actress (Laura Morante).
