= Gerasimos Skiadaresis =

Greek film, television, theatre, and voice actor

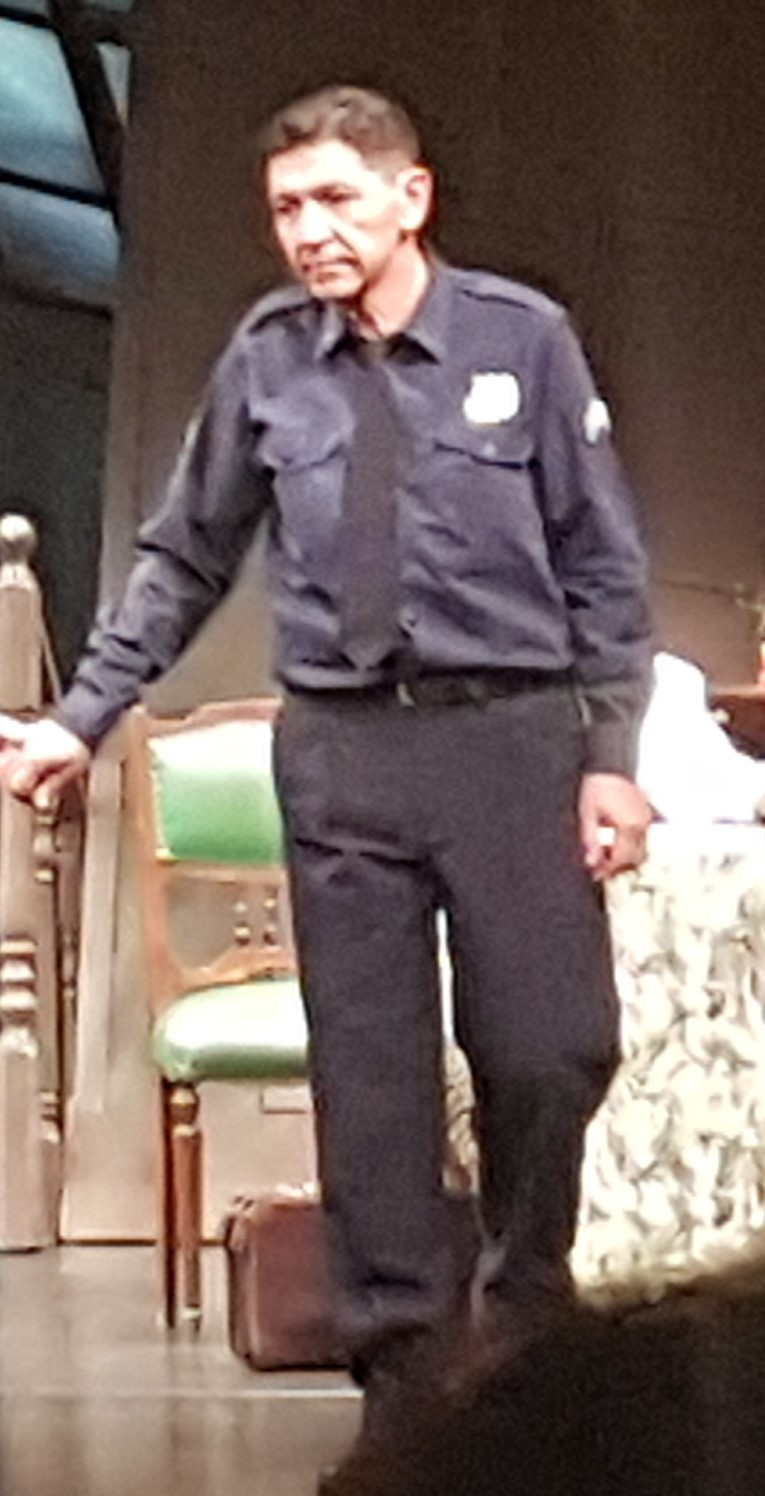
- Born: 18 December 1960 (age 65); Patras, Greece
- Occupation: Actor
- Height: 1.75
- Spouse: Bessie Malfa
- Children: 3

Gerasimos Skiadaresis (Greek: Γεράσιμος Σκιαδαρέσης; born 18 December 1960) is a Greek actor. He also worked in theatre at the E. Chatzikou School, which he began in 1982.

== Filmography ==
=== Film ===
Year	Title	Role	Notes	Ref.
1984	Loafing and Camouflage	sound recordist	Film debut	
1985	Meteor and shadow	Constant		
1985	Bordello	officer		
1986	The Back Door		short film	
1986	Alcestes	soldier in gas station		
1987	The rope	Lambis		
1987	Living Dangerously	Pantelis		
1988	Landscape in the Mist	soldier		
1989	Righter than Right	Petros Apostolou		
1991	The Suspended Step of the Stork	waiter		
1991	Night Out	Nikos		
1992	Donousa	mute		
1992	Gradual improvement in the weather		short film	
1993	The yard with the garbage	voice in the yard	voice role	
1993	White and Red			
1993	From the snow	Achilleas Nasios		
1993	Babis is getting married Tasia	Babis	short film	
1994	Present?		short film	
1996	The Slaughter of the Cock	Glafkos		
1997	Valkanizater	Stavros		
1997	Roza kind of like that		short film	
1998	Red Dragon	Symeon		
1999	The robbery	car driver		
1999	Bullets over Broadway			
2001	Brasilero	Charis		
2001	Captain Corelli's Mandolin	Stamatis		
2004	R 20	Grigoris		
2004	Quo Vadis?			
2006	Zafeiris		short film	
2006	Apostolos and Alone	Kostas		
2008	Beware of bear		short film	
2008	Bank Bang	Kostas		
2008	Bye to guns	doctor		
2009	Canteen	Vaggelis		
2009	The Heiress	Kapetanios		
2010	I Love Karditsa	Vaggelis		
2010	In a Frontier Station		short film	
2010	Liar Wanted			
2011	Taken from the bones	Lazaros		
2011	Apartment in Athens	Nikolas Helianos		
2011	The other sea		unfinished film	
2011	Little King		short film	
2011	The City of Children		cameo appearance	
2012	Larissa Confidential	Kyriakos		
2013	The Uncovered	Makis		
2014	The bird of Cyprus			
2014	Lomasankarit - The Island of Secrets	ACS special agent		
2015	Puppets	Stratos		
2015	Cloudy Sunday	Yannis		
2018	Together We Ate	Stamatis		
2018	Holy Boom	Javier		
2018	The right pocket of the robe			
2020	Handshake	memory (voice role)	short film	
2021	Man of God	minister of education		
2022	The place we live	Stavrakis		
2025	Unfair Routes	driver	short film	

== Television ==
Year	Title	Role	Notes
1986	Cheers Tasos Karatasos		1 episode
1989	Be quiet... The motherland sleeps		1 episode
1989	Crucifixion without resurrection		2 episodes
1989	He and he	waiter	Episodes: "Debate about absurdity"
1990	Love Stories		Episode: "Zoe starts a new life"
1990	I'm looking for an acquaintance	Dimitris Tsiakoumis	1 episode
1990–1991	The yellow envelope	Miltos Roussis	Various episodes
1991	Tight hole wall contacts	doctor	1 episode
1992	The 13th box	Nektaris	4 episodes
1992–1994	Department of Ethics	various roles	5 episodes
1993	Your Decision		1 episode
1993–1994	Anastasia	Tasos	Recurring role / 13 episodes
1994	Vampire Inn		Series regular / 14 episodes
1994	The lawyers of Athens	Petros	Episode: "Violent Love"
1994	The ridiculousness of it	Kostas	Episode: "Free gift"
1995	Anatomy of a crime	priest	Episode: "Fallen angel"
1995	Lost spring	secret agent	1 episode
1995	Magic night		Episode: "Death mat"
1995–1996	The fitting of the wedding dress	Lambros	Series regular / 25 episodes
1996	Scorpio	Nikolai Yiuresku	Episode: "The archangel of death"
1996	City streets	Lakis Stathopoulos	Episode: "A bag from Italy"
1997	Double truth	lieutenant Theodoridis / Petros	Episodes: "Exit" & "Unknown father"
1997	The colors of love	various roles	Episodes: "Angel" & "Magic Flute"
1998–1999	Men are no more	Thanasis	Lead role / 28 episodes
1999	Victims of peace	Marios	6 episodes
2000	The Love Boat: I'll see you on the boat	Michalis Manousakis	1 episode
2000–2002	Red Circle	various roles	8 episodes
2002–2003	Patients and Hikers	Yangos Vardekis	Lead role / 20 episodes
2003–2004	Like Cats and Dogs	Aristides Ioannidis	4 episodes
2003–2006	To kafe tis Charas	Vangelis Fatseas	88 episodes
2004–2005	Colon	Tasos	Lead role / 18 episodes
2005–2006	My Sister's Sister's Sister	Giorgos	Lead role / 20 episodes
2005–2006	The Right Time	Vlassis	Lead role / 18 episodes
2005–2007	10th mandate	various roles	6 episodes
2006	Alone Apostolos	Kostas	Lead role / 20 episodes
2006–2007	You go, you come	Yorgos	Lead role / 20 episodes
2006–2007	Honorable Cuckolds	Thanasis / Spyros	Episodes: "The Mentor Cuckold" & "The Helmsman Cuckold"
2007–2008	Daddy's Girls	Anestis	Lead role / 26 episodes
2007–2009	Black Midnight	Apostolis Koutroubas	Lead role / 25 episodes
2008–2009	Hara is missing	Antonis Markou	Lead role / 20 episodes
2009	Working Woman		Episode: "Physical therapist"
2010	Star Wars	Sofoklis	Episode: "Bullfights"
2010	Dolls	Dionysos	2 episodes
2011–2013	The Kings	Emilios Kanellopoulos	Lead role / 99 episodes
2013–2015	Don't start moaning!	Yannis Stergiou	2 episodes
2014	Through These	Sotiris Periandros Boulangas	Episode: "The Albanian epic"
2014	Good jobs	Babis Kosteas	Episode: "Below you die"
2015	10th mandate	various roles	5 episodes
2015–2016	The Worst Week of my Life	Philippos Korniliadis	Lead role / 7 episodes
2016	Yes Chef!	officer Bekas	Episode: "The restaurants' war and a pate"
2016–2017	Asteras Rachoulas	Babis Karagounis	Lead role / 28 episodes
2017	Suburra: Blood on Rome	monsignor Theodosiou	7 episodes
2018	Thou Shalt not Kill	taxi driver	Episode: "Shadows"
2018–2019	The Durrells	Likourgos	4 episodes
2018–2020	Throw the fryer away	Alekos Lepidas	Lead role, 114 episodes
2019	The Red River	Sultan	2 episodes
2019–2021	Joy's café	Vangelis Fatseas	Lead role, 43 episodes
2021	Carte Postale	Kostas	Episode: "In love with love"
2021–2022	In Foreign Hands	Jordan Piperopoulos	Lead role, 157 episodes
2022–2025	Serres	Nikos	2 episodes
2022–2023	Black Rose	Lefteris Veliotis	Lead role, 141 episodes
2023	Milky Way	Tasos' coach	4 episodes
2023–2024	The shipwreck	Miltiadis Pandelidis	Lead role, 116 episodes
2024–2026	Grand Hotel	Hronis Komninos	Lead role
2025	Very awful ideas	witness	1 episode
2025	Your Family	Bakas	Episode: "Settlement of Accounts"

== Personal life ==
Skiadaresis married actress Bessie Malfa in 1997. They have three children.
