= Kostas Lychnaras =

Greek film and television director (1938–2025)

- Born: 4 October 1938
- Died: 15 May 2025 (aged 86)

Kostas Lychnaras (Greek: Κώστας Λυχναράς; 4 October 1938 – 15 May 2025) was a Greek film and television director.

== Life and career ==
Lychnaras was born on 4 October 1938 in Athens, and began editing and directing during the 1960s. He has directed and assisted in directing in over 40 television and film productions, including Konstantinou kai Elenis and To kafe tis Charas.

Lychnaras died on 15 May 2025, at the age of 86.
