= I Men... ke I Den =

- Genre: Comedy series
- Created by: Haris Romas; Anna Hatzissofia
- Directed by: Fotini Kotrotsi
- Starring: Joyce Evidi; Anna Kouri; Stelios Mainas; Haris Romas
- Opening theme: Malambo No 1 by Lia Vissi
- Composer: Lia Vissi
- Country of origin: Greece
- Original language: Greek
- No. of seasons: 3
- No. of episodes: 110

Production
- Producer: Frosso Ralli
- Production location: Athens
- Running time: 25 minutes / episode
- Production company: Studio ATA

Original release
- Network: ANT1
- Release: 16 September 1993 – May 1996

I Men... ke I Den (Greek: Οι Μεν... και Οι Δεν; English: Those and the others) is a Greek television comedy series which aired on ANT1 for three seasons, from 1993 to 1996. The scripts were written by Haris Romas and Anna Hatzissofia.

== Characters ==
=== Dionyssis Dangas ===
Dionyssis Dangas (Διονύσης Δάγκας, played by Haris Romas) was born to a Rebetiko singer (played by Sperantza Vrana) and an unnamed father. Later in the series his father was revealed to be a successful cross-dressing singer and committed homosexual who was seduced by a female colleague while drunk.

Dionyssis was raised in poverty and sought scholastic success in order to escape it. His favorite pet as a child was a rabbit. While unemployed and unable to get other supplies, his mother killed the rabbit and served it to Dionyssis as stew. This left him with a psychological trauma.

Dionyssis grew to be a social climbing lawyer and married into an affluent and well-connected family. By the start of the series Dionyssis was highly successful in his chosen profession, having secured a position in the Supreme Court of Greece and a luxurious residence in Kolonaki. His marriage on the other hand had grown stale, largely because of his lack of interest in sexual intercourse.

Dionyssis was nouveau riche and sought to impress others by showing off his wealth and education. He essentially became a snob and hated being reminded of his lowly origins. He was also a miser and hated expenses that gained him no prestige. One episode revealed his childhood idol to be Scrooge McDuck, to the point of Dionyssis having his own Number One Dime. He earned his first dime by winning his first trial at the age of five: two kids were fighting over a loaf when he happened pass by. He asked, "Well, who does it belong to?" and one of the kids answered, "It belongs to the other kid. But if you say that it belongs to me I'll give you this dime." And so he earned his first dime by practising his future job.

During the series, Dionyssis grows used to financially supporting both his wife and his neighbours. By the series finale he is a father of two, but is much closer emotionally to the son of his neighbour. The finale suggests Dionyssis is attempting to raise four children instead of two and learning to co-habit with the Stamati family.

=== Vana Danga ===
Vana Danga (Βάνα Δάγκα, played by Anna Kouri) is wife of Dionyssis. Born to socially prominent parents, she grew up in luxury and attended the finest schools. However opportunities were only offered to her due to the financial support of her father. She herself is rather naive, sometimes even childish, and not particularly intelligent. Her studies had no practical use and left her with very little actual knowledge.

After finishing school, Vana was pursued by Dionyssis in his effort in social climbing. Ironically, she was actually in love with him. Her greatest disappointment during the series was being a warm and passionate woman in an essentially passionless and sexless marriage. She constantly attempted to seduce her husband, with little success. On the other hand, Vana sought to appease her vanity by buying increasingly expensive furs and other material possessions, thus infuriating her miserly husband.

During the series Vana becomes a strange friend to Nana, always ready to put her down because of her lowly origins and fashion choices, but also ready to follow her lead in various money-making schemes. Several episodes have the women bonding.

By the end of the series Vana is a mother of two, but finds herself much closer emotionally to the daughter of Nana than to her own.

=== Timos Stamatis ===
Timotheos "Timos" Stamatis (Τιμόθεος "Τίμος" Σταμάτης, played by Stelios Mainas), son of a conservative school teacher, rebelled against the values of his mother and led a Bohemian life. Unemployed throughout the series, Timos supported himself by petty theft, the meager earnings of his wife and loans from his "buddy" Dionyssis.

He won a small apartment in Kolonaki in a game show. He is an amateur clarinettist who plays his music at all hours. He is still in love with his wife, and eager for any opportunity for sexual intercourse. Though cunning enough to scam his way to money, Timos is even more naive than Vana, and never understands that Dionyssis dislikes him. His favorite victim is also his best friend, or so he thinks.

By the end of the series he is a father of two, but busy teaching Dionyssis's son the art of theft.

=== Nana Stamati ===
Nana Stamati (portrayed by Joyce Evidi) is the daughter of two flower children and particularly close with her rock musician father. To the point of jealous Timos suspecting Oedipus complex (actually Electra complex).

Equally as bohemian as her husband, Nana is the income provider in the family. She is an "artist" and sells her jewellery, statues and other artifacts in Monastiraki. She is a shrewdish con artist and typically leads either Timos or Vana in money-making schemes, some of which are successful while others backfire.

By the end of the series she is a mother of two, but is closer to Vana's daughter than to her own children.

== Broadcast ==
The program achieved high ratings throughout its run, and was one of the most popular shows in Greek and Greek-language television. Episodes are regularly rerun by ANT1 and the sister channel Makedonia TV.
