= Christina Tsafou =

Greek actress

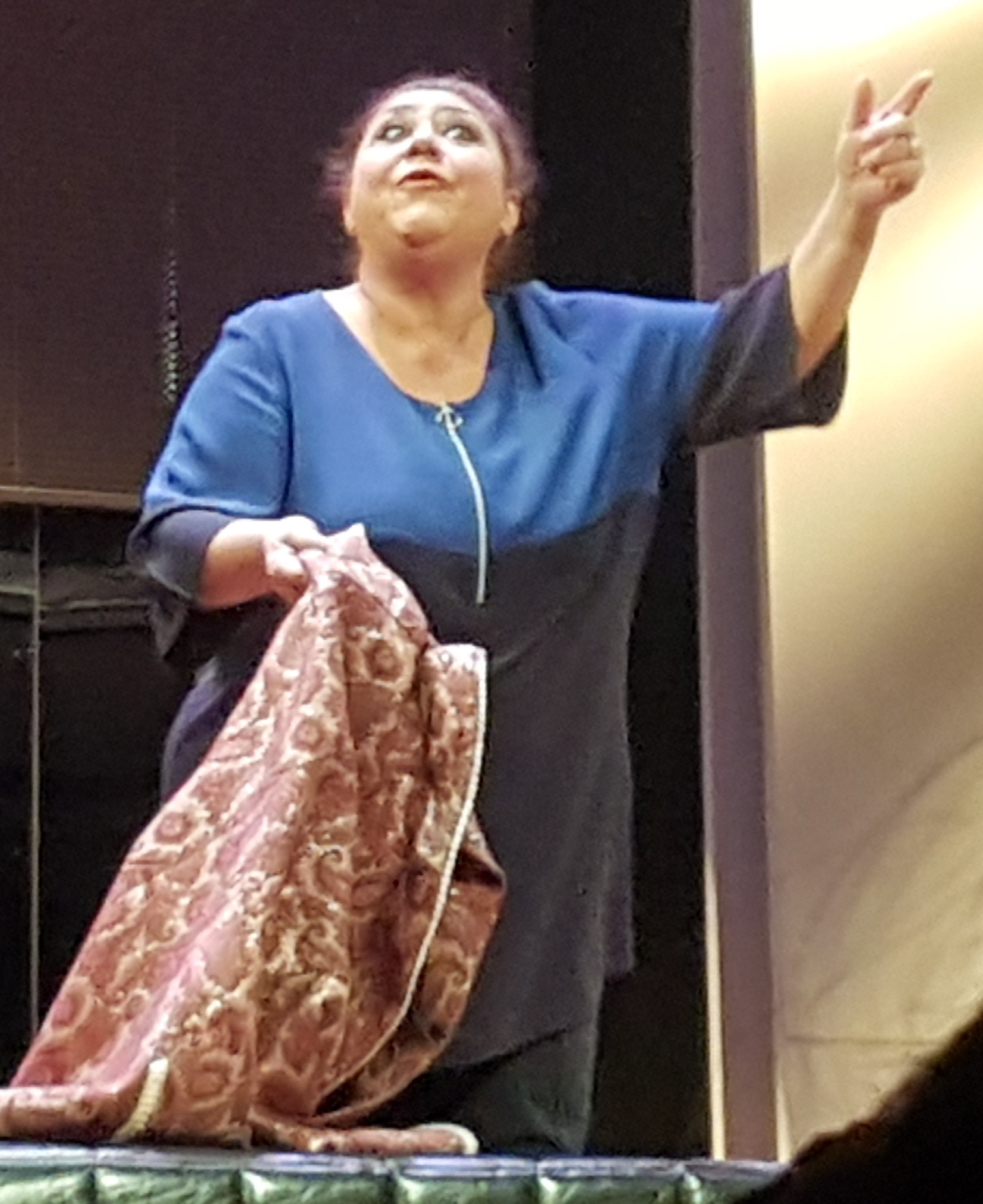
- Born: 1957; Athens, Greece
- Education: Drama School of the Art Theatre
- Occupation: Actress

Christina Tsafou (Greek: Χριστίνα Τσάφου; born 1957) is a Greek actress known for her TV and film roles.

== Career ==
She trained to be an actor at Karolos Koun's Drama School. She became known for appearing in the series Thesmoforiazouses. Her work also includes The Dreamcatcher, You Will Find Your Teacher, The Life of the Other and The Classmates. From 2003 to 2006 she was in the Greek TV comedy drama To kafe tis Charas. In 2014 she appeared in the Greek telenovella Symmathites.

Her films include I love Karditsa and Larissa confidential.

She has a son, Christos Zachariades, who is also an actor.

== Filmography ==
=== Television ===
Year	Title	Role(s)	Notes
1992	The two orphans		Episode: "The classmates"
1993	The two sins are forgiven	Matina	Episode: "One kiss is not enough"
1994	One Wonderful Life	secretary	1 episode
1994	Vanilla chocolate		Episode: "Dangerous game"
1995-1996	Our Father	religious teacher	Episodes: "To our teacher with love" & "Ascetic life"
1996	Sophia the correct	Spyridoula Mavrodakou	1 episode
1999	Judah kissed wonderful		1 episode
2001	Karampelas Family		1 episode
2002	Orange Vodka	Kassiani	3 episodes
2002	Very Family Friendly	client	1 episode
2003	Mother and Son		Episode: "The friends"
2003	White House		1 episode
2003-2006	Joy's Café	Chaido Polymenea	Series regular / 88 episodes
2005	Safe Sex TV Stories	Tasoula / Toula	Episodes: "A person to trust" & "It rains and snows"
2005-2007	You will find your teacher	Despina Pontiki	Lead role / 80 episodes
2007-2008	Mermaids	Orkalia	Lead role / 24 episodes
2008	Wild Guys		Episode: "Auto pilot"
2008-2009	40 Waves	Voulgaria	Lead role / 28 episodes
2009	The life of the other woman	Aliki	4 episodes
2009-2011	Dream Catcher	Maroula	Lead role / 34 episodes
2012	Clinical Case	Roza Basi	1 episode
2014	Modern Family	kindergarten teacher	1 episode
2014-2017	The Classmates	Dina Nikolaidi	Series regular / 433 episodes
2017-2018	Zoe the Virgin	Chrysanthi Kallergi	Lead role / 187 episodes
2019	Throw the fryer away	Selena	4 episodes
2019-2020	The Block of Flats Mess	Teta Chatzi	Lead role / 35 episodes
2019-2021	Joy's Café	Chaido Polymenea	Series regular / 43 episodes
2021-2022	I love you but...	Nina	Lead role / 50 episodes
2022–present	Our own family	Stavroula Koletsi	Lead role

== Films include ==
- Afstiros Katallilo (2006)
- Thursday the 12th (2014)
