= Andy Paul =

Greek Cypriot singer and songwriter

Andy Paul Άντι Πολ
- Birth name: Andreas Pavlou
- Origin: United Kingdom
- Genres: pop, dance
- Occupation(s): Musician, songwriter, singer
- Years active: 1980–present
- Website: www.apmusic.co.uk

Andy Paul is a Greek-Cypriot singer and songwriter. He represented Cyprus with the song "Anna Maria Lena" in the Eurovision Song Contest 1984 in Luxembourg.

At the Cyprus Eurovision national finals, Paul came in first, winning the spot to represent Cyprus at the international event. Lia Vissi-Piliouri, Anna Vissi's sister, came in second at the event with the song "Htes".

== History ==
Paul is a Greek Cypriot who immigrated to the UK in the early 1960s. He became a singer and songwriter influenced by artists such as Elvis, Cliff Richard, Tom Jones and Engelbert Humperdinck.

Paul started his career in a pub sponsored by Bob Whitley, singing in a talent contest. Encouraged by his friends and family to enter, he won first prize with his impersonation of his childhood idol Elvis Presley. His performance was so good, the Whitley Taverns gave him a contract. Paul went on to sing in top venues throughout the UK until his big hit with "Anna Mari-Elena". Although he was Greek, he had little contact with the Greek community; he was more of an English artist.

Andy Paul's first song was a simple melody entitled "Heartbreak Situation", produced by the now world-famous Stock, Aitken and Waterman. In the months that followed, a second release gave Paul his first big break – the song was "Anna Mari-Elena", which Andy wrote and entered in the Cypriot Eurovision Song Contest. The song went on to win the national contest, and was the entry for Cyprus in 1984. This was to be the first international hit for the Hit Factory. The next six years saw Paul touring extensively throughout Europe, gaining a following and many successes. In 1986 he released "Now That I Found You", an instant disco hit in Europe and in Greece.

Andy Paul has had all his success in Europe. After the 1984 Eurovision Song Contest, everything changed for Paul – he became a big star in the Greek music industry. He has supported big names such as Demis Roussos at the Royal Festival Hall, and worked with others in Greece and Cyprus.

== Discography ==
- Anna Mari-Elena (Greek)
- Anemona (Greek)
- An Tin This (Greek)
- Atelioti Agapi (Greek)
- An Anakalipso (Greek)
- A Piece of Heaven
- Bai Bai Bai (Greek)
- Berasmenes Mou Agapes (Greek)
- Boso Mou Lipis Mana (Greek)
- Boys Don't Cry
- Boso Mou Lipis Mana (Greek)
- Broto Fili (Greek)
- Boso Mou Lipis Mana (Greek)
- Bos (Greek)
- Bou Tha Bas (Greek)
- Broto Fili (Greek)
- Bring Back The Sunshine
- Change
- Clubland
- Could This Be Love
- Darling If You Leave Me
- Don't Be Disrespectful To Me
- Domino (Greek)
- Ego Fteo (Greek)
- Epetios (Greek)
- Follow Your Heart
- Genithike Ena Star (Greek)
- Glikia Melodia (Greek)
- Happy Anniversary
- Hanese (Greek)
- Hearbreak Situation
- Home Is Where The Heart Is
- How Do I Go On
- How Do I Let Go
- I Believe
- I Bortes Oles Klisane (Greek)
- I Karthies Bou Bonane (Greek)
- I'm Leaving You
- I'm Not A Casanova
- I'm so Sad
- Ime THikosou (Greek)
- Infinity
- I Owe It All To You
- It's Up To You And Me
- I Will Go On
- I Was Lonely Maria
- I Will Go On
- I zoi (Greek)
- Katazitite (Greek)
- Karthiamou (Greek)
- Karthihtipia Sta Thrania (Greek)
- Kalokeri (Greek)
- Keely
- Kiomos (Greek)
- Kratame (Greek)
- Ksenomania (Greek)
- Let's Pretend
- Long Distance Call To Heaven
- Loulouthia Afthona (Greek)
- Mia Gineka (Greek)
- Min Alaksis Bote (Greek)
- Mono Esi (Greek)
- Mystery
- My First Big Rodeo
- My Little Home
- Never The Winner
- Never Never Before
- Nostalgic
- Now That I found You
- Oh Baby
- On The Inside
- Oli Mazi (Greek)
- Ohi (Greek)
- Only Dreams
- One Way Journey
- Oti Ke Na Bis (Greek)
- Oti Ke Na Gini (Greek)
- Oxigono (Greek)
- Pour Me A Last One
- Ptisi 623 (Greek)
- Rendezvous (Greek)
- Save Me
- Se Anazito (Greek)
- Sorry Sandy
- So Hard
- Skotosame Ena Erota (Greek)
- Tetio Thilima (Greek)
- The Magic of Xmas
- Then Ipan Ne (Greek)
- This Is My Moment
- Then Boro (Greek)
- To Telefteo Sou Grama( Greek)
- To Thromaki (Greek)
- Together Forever
- Vacationing Lovers
- Walk on By
- When I Look into Your Eyes
- Why Lord
- Why Did You Break My Heart
- Zoi Se Emena Fernis Thistihia (Greek)

Preceded by Stavros & Constantina with I agapi akoma zi	Cyprus in the Eurovision Song Contest; 1984	Succeeded by Lia Vissi with To katalava arga
