= Symmathites =

Greek television series

- Created by: Vicky Alexopoulou
- Directed by: Vassilis Thomopoulos
- Starring: Krateros Katsoulis, Marianna Toumasatou, Faidra Drouka, Marios Athanasiou, Dimitris Mavropoulos, Penelope Anastasopoulou, Nikoleta Karra
- Country of origin: Greece
- No. of seasons: 3
- No. of episodes: 268 (Seasons 1-2)

Production
- Running time: 45 minutes/episode

Original release
- Network: ANT1
- Release: October 2014

Oi Symmathites (often referred to as Symmathites, Εnglish: The Classmates or Classmates) is a Greek television soap opera created by Vicky Alexopoulou and Yorgos Feidas for ANT1. It premiered on October 28, 2014 and concluded on July 28, 2017. Set in Athens, Greece, the show centers upon the life of some classmates 18 years after their graduation and how their lives continue after that.

== Production ==
=== Development ===
In 2014, ANT1 was on the hunt to create a new prime time soap opera for its 2014/2015-season. After different proposals they decided to buy the television rights of the Argentine telenovela Graduados, broadcast by Telefe, adapting the project on its greek edition. As the main director of the show was announced Vasilis Thomopoulos, who stopped his long-running collaboration with Mega Channel, and Vicky Alexopoulou as the head writer of the series. ANT1 at first decided to run the show for one and only season with 180 episodes really closely to the original television format.

On May of 2015, shortly before the show was ready to be cancelled, ANT1 decided to renew the show after the agreement of the Argentinian creators because of the high ratings of the first season. Because the original storylines were almost completed the decision between ANT1 and Telefe was to create a new plot and storylines with almost the same characters for the second season of the show. The new head writer, who had to create an almost new series, was Yorgos Feidas. The original storyline of the show, based on the Argentinian Graduados, stops on the episode 170 the 12th episode of the second season.

On March of 2016 ANT1 renewed the show for its third season, continuing the original greek script of Yorgos Feidas.

=== Cancellation of the series ===
On March of 2017 the ratings of the show started falling ahead, after almost two years as a slot winner, because of the fifth season of Survivor Greece on Skai TV. On May, ANT1 decided to cancel the show after three seasons even though there was originally an intention to renew the show for a fourth season.

=== Taping ===
Oi Symmathites was shot at Finos Film Studios in Spata for its entire run.

=== Theme song ===
"Oi Symmathites", the theme song of Oi Symmathites, was written by Nikos Moraitis and was performed by Melisses.

== Series overview ==
Season	Episodes	Originally released	
Season	Episodes	First released	Last released
1	157	October 28, 2014	June 25, 2015
2	111	October 19, 2015	June 22, 2016
3	165	October 17, 2016	July 28, 2017

== Plot ==
Pavlos, Marilena and Vallia were the most popular kids in their school. On the other hand, Andreas, Kristy and Lefteris were into more of a rock lifestyle. The graduation party marked the end of an era for the school friends. Many years later, their paths cross again and they each have an influence on each other's lives.

== Cast ==
- Krateros Katsoulis
- Marianna Toumasatou
- Faidra Drouka
- Marios Athanasiou
- Dimitris Mavropoulos
- Penelope Anastasopoulou
- Nikoleta Karra
- Anastasia Pantousi
- Mihalis Marinos
- Pavlos Haikalis
- Kostas Triantafyllopoulos
- Kostas Koklas
- Christina Tsafou
- Periklis Albanis
- Pinelopi Plaka
