= Haris Romas =

Greek actor and screenwriter (born 1960)

Charis Romas
- Χάρης Ρώμας
- Born: Charalampos Rassias; 23 March 1960 (age 66); Piraeus, Greece
- Citizenship: Greece
- Education: National and Kapodistrian University of Athens (M.D.); Moraitis School
- Occupations: Actor; screenwriter; director; lyricist
- Years active: 1983–present

Charis Romas (Greek: Χάρης Ρώμας; born Charalampos Rassias, Greek: Χαράλαμπος Ρασσιάς; born 23 March 1960) is a Greek actor, screenwriter, and director of television and theatre, and lyricist.

== Biography ==
He was born on 23 March 1960 in Piraeus as Haralambos Rassias (Χαράλαμπος Ρασσιάς). He is most well known for co-writing and starring in the popular TV shows Konstantinou kai Elenis and To kafe tis Charas, where he played the iconic roles of Konstantinos Katakouzinos and Periandros Popotas respectively.

He is also a politician, having run for Regional Council of Attica region in the 2019 Greek regional elections, he was elected for the district of Central Athens, receiving 7.837 votes. He served as executive Regional Councillor for Culture from 2019 to 2021. Since 2021, he serving as Vice-Governor of Attica for Culture and Sports.

He was a candidate for Mayor of Chalandri and head of the "Chalandri to the Light" faction, for the 2023 Greek local elections.

== Filmography ==
Films
Year	Title	Transliteration
1983	Glykia Simoria	Γλυκιά Συμμορία
1985	Bordello	Μπορντέλο
1993	Gynaikes dilitirio	Γυναίκες δηλητήριο
2001	Roz olotahos	Ροζ ολοταχώς

Movies made for television
Year	Title	Transliteration
1985	I Mata Hari xanahtypa	Η Μάτα Χάρη ξαναχτυπά Mata Hari Hits Again
1987	I politehnitisa	Η πολυτεχνίτισσα I politehnitisa
1988	Pos ti lei I Vazelini, Turkika	Πως τη λεν τη βαζελίνη, τούρκικα Pos ti lei ti vazelini, tourkika
1998	Bravo giatre...	Μπράβο γιατρέ...
1999	To hrima sto laimo mou	Το χρήμα στο λαιμό μου
2000	Arseniko ke palia dantela	Αρσενικό και παλιά δαντέλα
2000	Armege lagous & koureve helones	Άρμεγε λαγούς και κούρευε χελόνες
2000	Gia panta mazi	Για πάντα μαζί
2006	Ena kapelo apo psatha Italias	Ένα καπέλο από ψάθα Ιταλίας
2007	Agapao ti mama sou	Αγαπώ τη μαμά σου
2018	Bravo giatre mou	Μπράβο γιατρέ μου

=== Television ===
Year	Title	Role(s)	Notes
1983	The screw		Episode: "Autobiography"
1983	Sklira Karydia	Stamatis	Series regular (8 episodes)
1983	Asteria apo homa		3 episodes
1990	The lady upstairs	Pandelis Georgiadis	TV mini series; also screenwriter
1990-1991	I mikri mas epitheorisi tou hthes kai tou simera	various roles	Also screenwriter
1991	Mamma mia	Vasilis Kalantzis	Series regular (28 episodes); also screenwriter
1992	Hellas Pallas		Lead role (20 episodes); also screenwriter
1993	The indivisible		TV mini series; also screenwriter
1993	The indivisible	Haris Gantemidis	Episode: "Do you have life insurance?"
1993-1996	I Men... ke I Den	Dionysis Dangas	Lead role (110 episodes); also screenwriter
1997-1998	O kakos vezyris	Kleon Veziris	Lead role (26 episodes); also screenwriter
1998-2000	Konstantinou kai Elenis	Konstantinos Kantakouzinos	Lead role (68 episodes); also screenwriter
2000-2002	Lifting	Gerasimos Mantouvalos	Lead role (38 episodes); also screenwriter
2001	10 lepta kyrigma	Fivos	3 episodes
2003-2004	Voitheia geitonoi	Dimitris	Lead role (22 episodes)
2003-2006	To kafe tis Charas	Periandros Popotas	Lead role (88 episodes); also screenwriter
2004	Savatogennimenes	Xenophondas Tsitsingos	1 episode
2006	Gamos me ta ola tou	Himself / The star	Episodes: "Umbilical cord" & "Marriage is a prison"; also screenwriter
2007-2008	Deligianneion Parthenagogeion	Mimis Metaxas	Lead role (28 episodes); also screenwriter
2009-2010	Doctor Roulis	Alexandros Fikioris	Lead role (9 episodes); also screenwriter
2019	An imoun plousios	Sotiris' boss	5 episodes
2019-2021	To kafe tis Charas	Periandros Popotas	Lead role (43 episodes); also screenwriter
2022	Ta Neoklassika	psychiatrist	Episode: "My Friend Lefterakis"; also screenwriter
2023	I diki mas oikogeneia	Aristotle	40 episodes
2023	Ta Neoklassika	Andreas Mavrogialouros	Episode: "There's also philotimos"; also screenwriter

== Animated films ==
- Quest for Camelot (Devon) (Greek version)
- The Wild (Nigel the Koala) (Greek version)
