= Konstantinou kai Elenis =

- Κωνσταντίνου και Ελένης
- Created by: Haris Romas; Anna Chatzisofia
- Directed by: Kostas Lychnaras
- Starring: Haris Romas; Eleni Rantou; Maria Lekaki; Vasilis Koukouras; Kallirroi Miriagkou; Stergios Nenes
- Theme music composer: Pascual Marquina Narro
- Opening theme: "España Cañi"
- Country of origin: Greece
- Original language: Greek
- No. of seasons: 2
- No. of episodes: 68

Production
- Production locations: Greece, Athens, Marousi
- Running time: 40-50 minutes

Original release
- Network: ANT1
- Release: October 12, 1998 – June 30, 2000

Konstantinou kai Elenis (Greek: Κωνσταντίνου και Ελένης, lit. 'Konstantino's and Eleni's') is a Greek TV sitcom broadcast on ANT1 channel, which aired from October 1998 until June 2000. The story revolves around the cohabitation of two people with very different personalities; an assistant professor of Byzantine Studies at the University of Athens named Konstantinos Katakouzinos and a waitress named Eleni Vlachaki. The series focuses on the clash of Konstanino's and Eleni's very different personalities as they live together and have to deal with each other.

The main stars are Haris Romas, who co-wrote the script along with Anna Hatzisofia, and Eleni Rantou. The character of Manthos is portrayed by Vasilis Koukouras whereas the character of Peggy, Matina and Nikolas are portrayed by Maria Lekaki, Kalirroi Miriagou and Stergios Nenes respectively. The series ran for two seasons, 1998-1999 and 1999-2000, and consisted of 68 episodes. Each episode lasts about 40–45 minutes. Reruns of the series are still being broadcast to date.

Konstantinou kai Elenis is considered one of the most successful Greek TV series and has had a cultural impact on the Greek-speaking world. The show is one of the few Greek-produced series to have achieved a cult status, scoring high viewership ratings for roughly twenty years after its finale and maintaining a dedicated fanbase.

== Storyline ==
Konstaninos' uncle dies and leaves two wills appointing as inheritors of his small mansion in Marousi, Athens his nephew, an assistant professor of Byzantine Studies at the University of Athens and Eleni, his gardener's daughter. The prospective inheritors and their lawyers do not know which will was written first as the second will would deem the first invalid. As they are both emotionally attached to the house, they decide to compromise and live together until the court's decision.

Konstaninos and Eleni's very different personalities conflict, leading them to major quarrels over sometimes unimportant things. Konstantinos, a narrow minded but extremely educated person, with good manners, obsessed with the Byzantine Empire, is a very conservative character who speaks puristic Greek and is very religious and superstitious. He also dislikes being in the company of others and hates every type of modern entertainment. Eleni works as a waitress at a bar, non educated with terrible manners, uses slang and often vulgar words and expressions, and is a very open minded and kind-hearted person. A typical young woman, she enjoys all kinds of modern entertainment and has many friends and many short-lived relationships. In many episodes, their mutual dislike even leads one of the two, or even both, to plot against the other to become the sole inheritor of the house.

Various other subplots play a significant role in many episodes, usually involving the most important supporting characters: Peggy is Eleni's closest friend, a waitress at the same bar and a talentless actress. Manthos, Konstantinos' closest friend and schoolmate, is the son of a rich industrialist who has multiple relationships including his most permanent one, Peggy. Matina is Konstantinos and Eleni's old friend and neighbour, a civil servant who is single, afraid that she'll die alone, and is obsessed with getting married. Nicolas is the bartender at the bar where Eleni and Peggy work and a very close friend of both.

== Recording ==
The show was mostly recorded at Paiania Studio in Attica, but the characters visited many areas inside and outside the city such as Arachova and Hydra.

== Cast and characters ==
The main cast of the series includes Haris Romas and Eleni Rantou as Konstantinos and Eleni, the protagonists. The show also featured many popular actors and as guest stars in various episodes.

=== Main cast ===
- Haris Romas as "Konstantinos Katakouzinos": He is a grumpy, overly conservative and narrow-minded Byzantinologist, who works as an assistant professor at the University of Athens. He is also the author of an unpublished book called "The Sewer System in Byzantium", which he regards as a masterpiece, but nobody is interested in publishing it. Konstantinos has many peculiarities and is an extremely difficult person to deal with, let alone live with.
- Eleni Rantou as "Eleni Vlachaki": She is a strong-willed and kind-hearted young woman, without any formal manners and rather uneducated. She works as a waitress in a night bar and is shown to have many short-lived relationships, which usually differ between episodes. Eleni calls Konstantinos by the nickname "Katakouzina", a pun on his name and the word "κουζίνα" meaning kitchen in Greek.
- Maria Lekaki as "Peggy Karra (Panagiota Carachisaridou)": The closest friend of Eleni's. Her real name is Panagiota Carachisaridou, but she has adopted an "artistic" name. Her dream is to become a famous actress, and she constantly tries to grasp leading roles at various plays, but with no result, as she is completely talentless. Her main profession is waiting at the same bar in which Eleni works. She is also Manthos' fiancée and main love interest, among many.
- Vasilis Koukouras as "Manthos Foustanos": Konstantinos' best friend and probably the only person who tolerates him. He is a lazy playboy with a huge ego and the only son of a rich industrialist; his only interest in life seems to be women. He is almost always shown to be in a relationship with Peggy during the series, who eventually becomes his only girlfriend. He also loves expensive sportscars and especially his Porsche, which he often brags about. A running gag of the show is that he is usually seen trying to hide from his girlfriends the existence of his other girlfriends, usually by a close call.
- Kallirroi Miriagou as "Matina Mantarinaki": Eleni's second best friend and neighbor. She is a very punctual person who always provides Eleni with food and likes being in her company, even when the latter teases her about her non-existent love life. With no self-esteem, Matina has assured herself that she's probably never going to get married, although she often tries to attract men. She has a constant crush on Konstantinos and Nikolas, who both avoid her at any cost.
- Stergios Nenes as "Nicolas Varthaculias": He is the bartender in the bar in which Eleni and Peggy work. He drives a Harley Davidson which is well beyond his means and hasn't paid off even after the series' end. He is shown to have occasional relationships.

=== Recurring cast ===
- Ilias Zervos as "Nikos Grevias": Konstantinos' lawyer.
- Eleni Filippa as "Elli Roussou": Eleni's lawyer, and past love interest of Nikolas.
- Lilian Arhonti as "Fiona Makri": Love interest of Manthos.
- Marianna Marteli as "Lila": Love interest of Manthos.
- Chrysa Kontogiorgou as "Joanna": Love interest of Manthos.
- Thanasis Papageorgiou as "Lefteris Anagnostou": Student of Konstantinos.
- Konstantina Chalkiopoulou as "Maria Boukouvala": Student of Konstantinos.
- Giorgos Samolis as "Alkis Ioannou": Student of Konstantinos.
- Maria Palaiologou as "Nitsa Voupoura": Neighbor of Konstantinos and Eleni, the ugly greengrocer of the neighborhood.

== Episodes ==
A total of 68 episodes have been broadcast; thirty-three in the first season and thirty-five in the second season.

Season	Episodes	Originally released	
Season	Episodes	First released	Last released
1	33	October 12, 1998	June 7, 1999
2	34	October 11, 1999	June 30, 2000

=== Season 1 (1998–1999) ===
The season started on 12 October 1998 and finished on 7 June 1999. It included thirty-three episodes.

No. overall	No. in season	Title	Directed by	Written by	Original release date
1	1	"Sigkatikisi (Cohabitation)"	Kostas Lychnaras	Haris Romas, Anna Hadjisophia	October 12, 1998
2	2	"San to Skilo me ti Gata (Like Dog and Cat)"	Kostas Lychnaras	Haris Romas, Anna Hadjisophia	October 19, 1998
3	3	"Violistis stin Idia Stegi (Fiddler on the Same Roof)"	Kostas Lychnaras	Haris Romas, Anna Hadjisophia	October 26, 1998
4	4	"Otan Pigename Mazi Scholio (When we used to go to school together)"	Kostas Lychnaras	Haris Romas, Anna Hadjisophia	November 2, 1998
5	5	"Moro Mou, Moro Mou Esi (My Baby, My Baby you)"	Kostas Lychnaras	Haris Romas, Anna Hadjisophia	November 9, 1998
6	6	"Den Plirono, Den Plirono (Can't Pay? Won't Pay!)"	Kostas Lychnaras	Haris Romas, Anna Hadjisophia	November 16, 1998
7	7	"Thia Maro, Kale Thia Maro (Part A) (Aunt Maro, Dear Aunt Maro (Part A))"	Kostas Lychnaras	Haris Romas, Anna Hadjisophia	November 23, 1998
8	8	"Thia Maro, Kale Thia Maro (Part B) (Aunt Maro, Dear Aunt Maro (Part B))"	Kostas Lychnaras	Haris Romas, Anna Hadjisophia	November 30, 1998
9	9	"O Erotas Gennithike Gia Tesseris (Love was made for Four)"	Kostas Lychnaras	Haris Romas, Anna Hadjisophia	December 7, 1998
10	10	"Paradosi Kat'ikon... Anohis (Pent... House Delivery)"	Kostas Lychnaras	Haris Romas, Anna Hadjisophia	December 14, 1998
11	11	"Hali Birthday (Sucky Birthday)"	Kostas Lychnaras	Haris Romas, Anna Hadjisophia	December 21, 1998
12	12	"Gia tin Kardia tis Oreas Elenis (For the heart of Beautiful Helen)"	Kostas Lychnaras	Haris Romas, Anna Hadjisophia	January 11, 1999
13	13	"Mad Spiti (Mad House)"	Kostas Lychnaras	Haris Romas, Anna Hadjisophia	January 18, 1999
14	14	"Soe kai Avlaves (Part A) (Safe and Sound (Part A))"	Kostas Lychnaras	Haris Romas, Anna Hadjisophia	January 25, 1999
15	15	"Soe kai Avlaves (Part B) (Safe and Sound (Part B))"	Kostas Lychnaras	Haris Romas, Anna Hadjisophia	February 1, 1999
16	16	"Sta Ori, ta Agria Vouna (At the High Mountains)"	Kostas Lychnaras	Haris Romas, Anna Hadjisophia	February 8, 1999
17	17	"Trianta Vale... Karatia (Thirty plus... Carats)"	Kostas Lychnaras	Haris Romas, Anna Hadjisophia	February 15, 1999
18	18	"Sexoualiki Parenohlisi (Sexual Harassment)"	Kostas Lychnaras	Haris Romas, Anna Hadjisophia	February 22, 1999
19	19	"To Telefteo Tango sto Maroussi (Last Tango in Maroussi)"	Kostas Lychnaras	Haris Romas, Anna Hadjisophia	March 1, 1999
20	20	"The Konstantinou kai Elenis Show "	Kostas Lychnaras	Haris Romas, Anna Hadjisophia	March 8, 1999
21	21	"O Erastis tis Kommotrias (The Hairdresser's Lover)"	Kostas Lychnaras	Haris Romas, Anna Hadjisophia	March 15, 1999
22	22	"I Farma ton Zoon (Animal Farm)"	Kostas Lychnaras	Haris Romas, Anna Hadjisophia	March 22, 1999
23	23	"I Magisses tou Amarousiou (The Witches of Amaroussion)"	Kostas Lychnaras	Haris Romas, Anna Hadjisophia	March 29, 1999
24	24	"Amnisia (Amnesia)"	Kostas Lychnaras	Haris Romas, Anna Hadjisophia	April 5, 1999
25	25	"I Vendeta (The Vendetta)"	Kostas Lychnaras	Haris Romas, Anna Hadjisophia	April 12, 1999
26	26	"Fonos sto Vizandio (Murder in Byzantium)"	Kostas Lychnaras	Haris Romas, Anna Hadjisophia	April 19, 1999
27	27	"Konstantinou kai Elenis Voithia Mas (St. Konstantinos and Eleni Bless our Souls)"	Kostas Lychnaras	Haris Romas, Anna Hadjisophia	April 26, 1999
28	28	"O Hartopektis (The Gamester)"	Kostas Lychnaras	Haris Romas, Anna Hadjisophia	May 3, 1999
29	29	"Sta Mathitika sou ta Vivlia (Ιn your School Books)"	Kostas Lychnaras	Haris Romas, Anna Hadjisophia	May 10, 1999
30	30	"Ena Asteri Genniete (A Star is Born)"	Kostas Lychnaras	Haris Romas, Anna Hadjisophia	May 17, 1999
31	31	"O Telefteos Anthropos Pou Ide ton Thio (Last Man to see the Uncle)"	Kostas Lychnaras	Haris Romas, Anna Hadjisophia	May 24, 1999
32	32	"Konstantinou kai Elenis on the Rocks"	Kostas Lychnaras	Haris Romas, Anna Hadjisophia	May 31, 1999
33	33	"I Diki (The Trial)"	Kostas Lychnaras	Haris Romas, Anna Hadjisophia	June 7, 1999

=== Season 2 (1999–2000) ===
The season started on 11 October 1999 and finished on 19 June 2000. It included thirty-five episodes.

No. overall	No. in season	Title	Directed by	Written by	Original release date
34	1	"I Kata Panourgian Asthenis (The Cunning Invalid)"	Kostas Lychnaras	Haris Romas, Anna Hadjisophia	October 11, 1999
35	2	"Me tin Thia Den Ine Amartia (With Aunt it's Not a Sin)"	Kostas Lychnaras	Haris Romas, Anna Hadjisophia	October 18, 1999
36	3	"To Rock kai to... Pourock (The Rock and the Ol' Rock)"	Kostas Lychnaras	Haris Romas, Anna Hadjisophia	October 25, 1999
37	4	"Agrio Thiliko (Wild Female)"	Kostas Lychnaras	Haris Romas, Anna Hadjisophia	November 1, 1999
38	5	"To Moro tis Rozmari (Part A) (Rosemary's Baby (Part A))"	Kostas Lychnaras	Haris Romas, Anna Hadjisophia	November 8, 1999
39	6	"To Moro tis Rozmari (Part B) (Rosemary's Baby (Part B))"	Kostas Lychnaras	Haris Romas, Anna Hadjisophia	November 15, 1999
40	7	"I Exindavelona (The Miseress)"	Kostas Lychnaras	Haris Romas, Anna Hadjisophia	November 22, 1999
41	8	"I Gampri tis Distihias (The Distress Grooms)"	Kostas Lychnaras	Haris Romas, Anna Hadjisophia	November 29, 1999
42	9	"Glikia Mou Exaderfi (My Dear Cousin)"	Kostas Lychnaras	Haris Romas, Anna Hadjisophia	December 6, 1999
43	10	"I Doules tou Katakouzene (The Maids of Katakou-Genet)"	Kostas Lychnaras	Haris Romas, Anna Hadjisophia	December 13, 1999
44	11	"I Germanoi Xanaxanarhonte (The Nazis Strike Again Again)"	Kostas Lychnaras	Haris Romas, Anna Hadjisophia	December 20, 1999
45	12	"O Pio Kalos Dimotis Ime Ego (The Best Citizen is Me)"	Kostas Lychnaras	Haris Romas, Anna Hadjisophia	January 10, 2000
46	13	"I Teleftea Mera tou Kosmou (The End of the World)"	Kostas Lychnaras	Haris Romas, Anna Hadjisophia	January 17, 2000
47	14	"Marijuana STOP"	Kostas Lychnaras	Haris Romas, Anna Hadjisophia	January 24, 2000
48	15	"Viva Mexico (¡Que viva México!)"	Kostas Lychnaras	Haris Romas, Anna Hadjisophia	January 31, 2000
49	16	"I Soferantzes (The Drivers)"	Kostas Lychnaras	Haris Romas, Anna Hadjisophia	February 7, 2000
50	17	"Esi Ise I Etia Pou Ipofero (You are the Reason why I Suffer)"	Kostas Lychnaras	Haris Romas, Anna Hadjisophia	February 14, 2000
51	18	"The Godmother"	Kostas Lychnaras	Haris Romas, Anna Hadjisophia	February 21, 2000
52	19	"I Kali Samaritis (The Good Samaritan)"	Kostas Lychnaras	Haris Romas, Anna Hadjisophia	February 28, 2000
53	20	"Tis Metamorfoseos (Feast of the Transfiguration)"	Kostas Lychnaras	Haris Romas, Anna Hadjisophia	March 6, 2000
54	21	"Aponi Zoi (Hardhearted Life)"	Kostas Lychnaras	Haris Romas, Anna Hadjisophia	March 13, 2000
55	22	"Tou Patros kai tou Iou (Part A) (Of Father and Son (Part A))"	Kostas Lychnaras	Haris Romas, Anna Hadjisophia	March 20, 2000
56	23	"Tou Patros kai tou Iou (Part B) (Of Father and Son (Part B))"	Kostas Lychnaras	Haris Romas, Anna Hadjisophia	March 27, 2000
57	24	"Konstantinos o Politevomenos (Konstantinos the Politician)"	Kostas Lychnaras	Haris Romas, Anna Hadjisophia	April 3, 2000
58	25	"I Trihes (Hair)"	Kostas Lychnaras	Haris Romas, Anna Hadjisophia	April 10, 2000
59	26	"Sismi, Limi kai... Katakouzini (Earthquakes, Starvations and Katakouzinations)"	Kostas Lychnaras	Haris Romas, Anna Hadjisophia	April 17, 2000
60	27	"Ta Avga kai ta Pashalia (Eggs and Lilacs)"	Kostas Lychnaras	Haris Romas, Anna Hadjisophia	April 24, 2000
61	28	"Vaskanias to Anagnosma (Spell Reading)"	Kostas Lychnaras	Haris Romas, Anna Hadjisophia	May 1, 2000
62	29	"Sferes Pano Apo to Marousi (Bullets Over Maroussi)"	Kostas Lychnaras	Haris Romas, Anna Hadjisophia	May 8, 2000
63	30	"I Triti Diathiki (The Third Will)"	Kostas Lychnaras	Haris Romas, Anna Hadjisophia	May 15, 2000
64	31	"I Lady kai i Alitra (Lady and the Trampess)"	Kostas Lychnaras	Haris Romas, Anna Hadjisophia	May 22, 2000
65	32	"Pare ta Lefta kai Treha (Take the Money and Run)"	Kostas Lychnaras	Haris Romas, Anna Hadjisophia	May 29, 2000
66	33	"Agapis Agonas Agonos (Love's Labour's Lost)"	Kostas Lychnaras	Haris Romas, Anna Hadjisophia	June 5, 2000
Konstantinos has met an elegant but fashion-victim magazine publisher and Eleni has begun an affair with a stockbroker who is a workaholic. The explosive personalities of the two cohabitants will not tolerate the idiosyncrasies of their new partners. Note: The title is the non-literal translation of "Love's Labour's Lost" (by William Shakespeare).
67	34	"Ti Ine Afto Pou to Lene Agapi (What's that thing Called Love?)"	Kostas Lychnaras	Haris Romas, Anna Hadjisophia	June 12, 2000
68	35	"O Gamos kai to Gamoto (The Wedding and the Damn)"	Kostas Lychnaras	Haris Romas, Anna Hadjisophia	June 19, 2000
69	36	"Making Of"	Kostas Lychnaras	Haris Romas, Anna Hadjisophia	June 30, 2000
