= Irene Koumarianou =

Greek actress (1930–2013)

- Ειρήνη Κουμαριανού
- Born: 1930; Galatsi, Greece
- Died: 25 January 2013 (aged 82–83); Evangelismos Hospital, Athens, Greece
- Resting place: Athens 2nd Cemetery
- Citizenship: Greece
- Education: Hellenic Conservatory
- Occupation: Actress
- Years active: 1951–2011
- Employer: Finos Film
- Spouse: Giorgos Papadogeorgis (m. 1959)
- Children: 2

Irene Koumarianou (Greek: Ειρήνη Κουμαριανού; 1930 – 25 January 2013) was a Greek actress of television, theatre, and cinema.

== Biography ==
Koumarianou was born in 1930, in Galatsi, Athens. She studied at the Greek Conservatory and starred in several plays, mainly at the National Theatre, which included several ancient tragedies, mainly by Epidaurus. She co-starred, with Alice Vougiouklaki, Jenny Karezi, Rena Vlachopoulou and others, during her career. Her film credits included History of Life, Girls on kissing (1965), Tears for Electra (1966), Too late for tears, Captain jack baton (1968), The fairy and the lad (1969), The aristocrat and the Tramp, I pity the stature (1970), The rascal, The efoplistina (1971), Mary of Silence, The constellation of the virgin (1973).

On television she appeared in series such as Anastasia (1994), The Prince (1996), "Betrayal" (1996), San sister (ET1 – 1998), Alma libre "(2001) and I love-I love and in 2004 had a small role in George Savvatogennimenes Kapoutzidis. the big success came in 2006 with the series "Sto Para Pente".

She was hospitalized at Evangelismos General Hospital with heart problems, and died on 25 January 2013, aged 83.

== Filmography ==
- Big Streets (1953)
- Dollars and Dreams (1956)
- Girls for Kissing (1964)
- History of Life (1965) .... Euterpe
- Block (1965)
- Tears for Elektra (1966)
- The MPs (1966) ... Lucia
- Stephanie (1966)
- Something Lads Tired (1967)
- Groom from London (1967)
- Two Feet in One Shoe (1967)
- Captain Jack Baton (1968) ... mother
- The Brightest Bouzouki (1968) ... aunt
- Too Late for Tears (1968)
- The Fairy and the Lad (1969) .... mother Manousou
- The Creature (1969) ... patroness
- Pity the Height You (1970) .... nightclub patron
- The Giakoumis a Romeikos heart (1970) ... neighbor
- The Trickster (1971) .... Excellent Varma
- The Daughter of the Sun (1971)
- The Efoplistina (1971)
- Erotic Agreement (1972)
- The Brave Die Twice (1973)
- Mary of Silence (1973)
- Iphigenia (1977)
- Anyone with Madness (1980)
- Crazy and All Greece (1983)
- Sudden Love (1984)
- Quiet Days of August (1991)
- Whoa! (2005) .... Adriana grandmother
- Sto Para Pente (2006) .... Sophie
- Life in the Forum (2009)
- The Other Half (2011)
