= Taraxias =

Greek hip-hop musician

Taraxias (born Georgios Gkogkas-Γεωργιος Γκογκας) is a Greek hip-hop artist.

== History ==
In 2004 he joined "Family" and took part in the recording sessions for Goin' Through's first album, entitled La Sagrada Familia.

In 2006 he released his first personal album Διαταραχή [Diatarahi] with Def Jam/Universal Records, selling 10,000 copies. He also participated in the recording of Goin' Through's album Vendetta. At the same time he played a number of concerts throughout Greece as an MC/DJ and on the stage of Votanikos with Anna Vissi. He supported the Athens concerts with headlining foreign artists such as Busta Rhymes and Cypress Hill.

In 2007, he released the album Δηλητήριο + Φάρμακο Poison + Medicine for free on his label, Hip Hope.
