= Lia Vissi =

Greek-Cypriot singer-songwriter (born 1955)

Lia Vissi Λία Βίσση
- Born: 15 May 1955 (age 70); Pyla, Larnaca, Cyprus
- Origin: Athens, Greece
- Genres: Jazz
- Occupations: Singer-songwriter, composer
- Instruments: Vocals, piano

Olympia "Lia" Vissi (Greek: Ολυμπία "Λία" Βίσση; born 15 May 1955) is a Greek Cypriot singer, songwriter and composer who is most notable for her two participations in the Eurovision Song Contest and for being the older sister of fellow singer Anna Vissi.

== Career ==
Vissi participated in the Eurovision Song Contest twice. In 1979, she was a supporting singer for Elpida, representing Greece and 1984 saw Vissi participate in the Cypriot national song contest with the song "Chtes", which came second.

Finally, in 1985 she represented Cyprus in the contest as a solo singer, singing her own composition "To katalava arga", to which she also penned the lyrics. The Cypriot entry came 16th out of 19 songs, receiving 15 points. She took part in the 1991 Greek final for Eurovision, singing the anthem Agapa ti Gi. She was placed second behind Sophia Vossou. In 1992, Greek television decided not to televise the national final. Vissi submitted a song for consideration, Kapios, and found herself voted into second place yet again.

In 2006, Vissi embarked on a political career, running for a seat in the House of Representatives of Cyprus in the 21 June elections. She represented the Democratic Rally in the Larnaca District but she was not elected.

Preceded by Andy Paul with Anna Maria Lena	Cyprus in the Eurovision Song Contest; 1985	Succeeded by Elpida with Tora zo
