= Oi Vasiliades =

- Genre: Comedy; Romance; Family
- Starring: Kostas Koklas; Gerasimos Skiadaresis; Martha Karagianni; Vasiliki Andritsou; Zeta Douka
- Opening theme: "Vasilias" performed by Michalis Hatzigiannis
- Ending theme: "Vasilias" performed by Michalis Hatzigiannis
- Country of origin: Greece
- Original language: Greek
- No. of episodes: 99 (aired)

Production
- Production locations: Athens, Greece
- Running time: 60 minutes (with commercials)

Original release
- Network: Mega Channel
- Release: 1 August 2012 – 19 December 2013

Related
- Los Roldan (2004); Los Sánchez (2005); Los Reyes (2005); Una familia con suerte (2011)

Oi Vasiliades (Greek: Οι Βασιλιάδες, "the Kings") was a Greek-language daily family-comedy telenovela produced by Greece's Mega Channel and premiere 8 January 2012. The series is based on the Argentinian series Los Roldan creation of Adriana Lorenzon and Mario Schajris. The screenplay adaptation was undertaken by Vicky Alexopoulou, Giorgos Chryssovitsanos, Kostas Kalafatis and Kostas Kaponis, and directed by Pierros Andrakakos, Nick Kritikos and Stamos Tsamis. The series ended temporarily (due to problems between production and channel) after 81 episodes on 8 June 2012,

The series resumed November 2013 and ran until 19 December.

== Cast ==
- Kostas Koklas — Markos Vasilias
- Gerasimos Skiadaresis — Aimilios Kanellopoulos
- Martha Karagianni — Eugenia Palaiologou
- Vasiliki Andritsou — Giouli Skouloudi
- Zeta Douka — Christina Rozaki
- Alexandra Palaiologou — Titika Vlaxou-Kanellopoulou
- Mina Orfanou — Lampis/Liza Vasilia
- Panos Vlaxos — Leonidas Vasilias
- Katerina Geronikou — Nefeli Malea
- Nelson Protopapas † — Alexis Kanellopoulos
- Nikos Anadiotis — Minas Kapatos
- Aggelina Paraskeuaidi — Marina Vasilia
- Eugenia Tsaousi — Sofi Kapatou
- Melina Spetsieri — Stella Vasilia
- Manos Ioannou — Stauros
- Sokratis Patsikas — Patroklos
- Christos Sapountzis — Tryfonas Maleas
- Vivian Kontomari — Despoina
- Eva Laskari — Tatiana Rousou
- Panagiotis Petrakis — Stefanos Aygeris
- Isavella Vlasiadou — Deby
- Dimitris Liolios — Sotiris Xaros
- Ilias Makras — Xaris Vasilias
- Thodoros Romanidis — Papadakis
- Konstantina Klapsinou — Sabrina
- Vivi Nikolakopoulou — Toula
- Maria Myriokefalitaki — Myrsini

== International release ==
Country	Network(s)	Title	Series premiere	Series finale	Weekly schedule	Timeslot
Greece	Mega Channel	Oi Basiliades/Οι Βασιλιάδες	8 January 2012 (1st season); 11 November 2013 (2nd season)	8 June 2012 (1st season); 19 December 2013 (2nd season)	Monday to Friday; Tuesday to Thursday	21:15; 22:30
Cyprus	ANT1 Cyprus	I zoi ine orea/Η ζωή είναι ωραία	20 May 2008	17 February 2009	Monday to Sunday	22:50; 21:50
