= Petros Filippidis =

Greek actor

- Πέτρος Φιλιππίδης
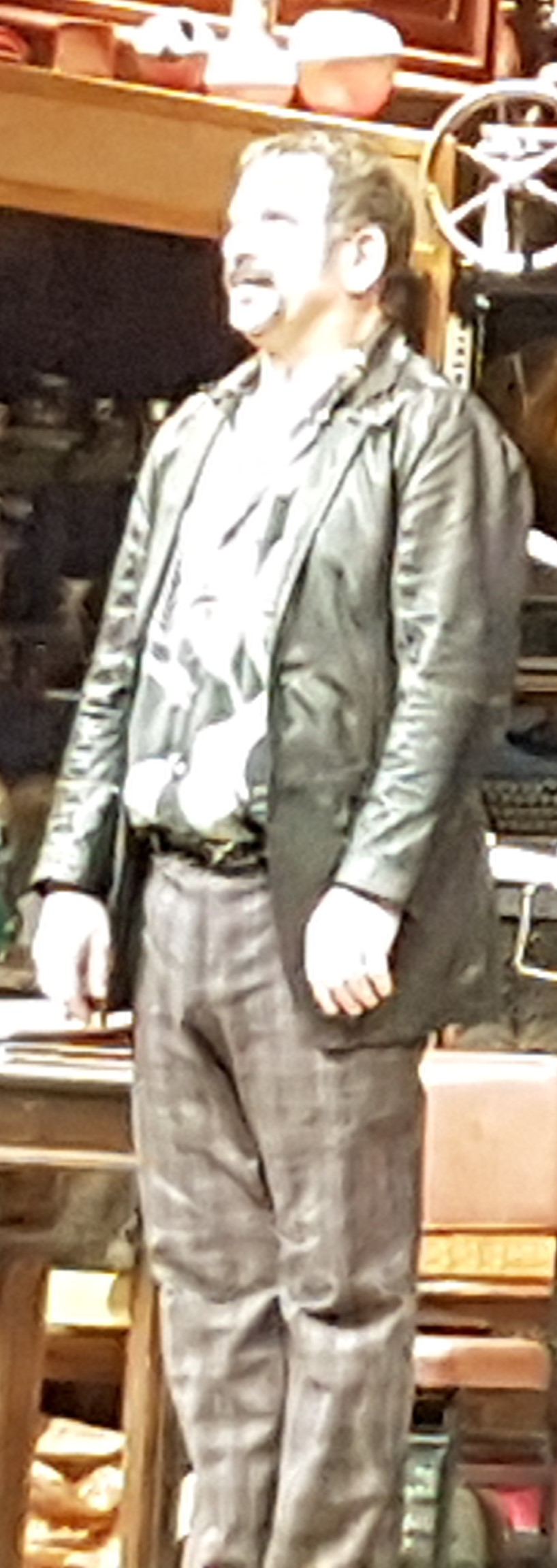
- Born: 31 December 1962 (age 63); Metaxourgeio, Athens, Kingdom of Greece
- Occupations: Actor; director; translator
- Years active: 1986–2021
- Criminal charges: Two counts of attempted rape
- Criminal penalty: Three years' imprisonment, suspended for three years
- Criminal status: Convicted
- Spouse: Elpida Ninou
- Children: 1

Petros Filippidis (Greek: Πέτρος Φιλιππίδης; born 31 December 1962) is a Greek actor, theatre director, and translator. He has starred in numerous television shows and films. On television, he has appeared in series such as Peninta Peninta, Oi aparadektoi, and in films such as *Akalyptos*.

On July 14, 2024, Petros Filippidis was sentenced to 8 years in prison by the court of first instance for two attempted rapes. He abstained from the theatre and public life in general, pending the outcome of his appeal. On July 15, 2025, the Athens Mixed Jury Court of Appeal sentenced him to three years in prison with a three-year suspension, which means he does not serve time unless he violates his parole conditions.

== Criminal prosecution ==
=== Greek #Greek #metoo ===
In the winter of 2021, allegations of sexual abuse by famous women began to appear in the media. The allegations of sexual abuse in sports, education, culture and entertainment targeted many popular and respected individuals in Greek society, causing what has been dubbed the "Greek #metoo".

In this context, in February 2021, three actresses Anna-Maria Papacharalambous, Lena Drosaki and Penelope Anastassopoulou spoke to TV networks to describe their experiences working with a well-known actor without initially mentioning his name. On February 4, Filippidis, despite no official charges or complaints being filed against him, sent an ultimatum to the media through his attorneys, prohibiting any mention of his person in the following days.

On April 7, the three female actresses sent a text with their complaints to the "Greek Actors' Union" - (SEI) (Σωματείο Ελλήνων Ηθοποιών, ΣΕΗ), requesting the removal of Petros Filippidis from the Union (SEI). In their complaint to the "SEI Disciplinary Committee", filed by their lawyers, they invoked the testimonies of ten additional persons who would support the content of their complaints.

The allegations that were made and related to the commission of criminal offences came to the attention of the prosecutor who called the actor in April 2021 in apologia. After the apologetic memorandum presented by Filippidis, the prosecutor filed criminal charges against him for three cases: a rape committed in 2008, and attempted rapes committed in 2010 and 2014.

In July 2021, Filippidis was held in custody and transferred to Tripoli prison where another actor accused of sexual offences, Dimitris Lignadis, was already being held.

=== Trial 2022–2023 ===
The trial of Petros Filippidis began on March 28, 2022, where the first woman who accused him of rape testified. The trial continued on April 1, 2022, at the Mixed Jury Court of Athens with the examination of the first woman who accused him of raping her repeatedly.

On May 16, 2022, the second woman testified, accusing Petros Filippidis of attempted rape in 2010 in his dressing room at the Mousouri Theatre.

After he had been in custody since July 2021, Filippidis was released on July 1, 2022, because of health problems, on conditions that he be banned from leaving the country, must appear at his local police precinct twice a month, pay a 20,000€ bail. The reasoning was that he is no longer considered a threat to commit the same crimes. On September 13, 2022, the Hellenic Actors' Union (SEI) president Spyros Mpimpilas testified at the court and called on Petros Filippidis to apologize to his victims. He also recounted that Petros Filippidis, after the first complaints, had requested him to prevent a woman from proceeding with a complaint against him. The trial continued on October 4, 2022, where a female journalist testified in favor of Filippidis, stating that he had treated her and other colleagues well. After a summons made by the court, Tasos Chalkias, Alina Kotsovoulou, Zeta Makripoulia, Thaleia Matika and Rania Schiza also gave testimonies.

On November 22, 2022, actresses Tzouli Souma and Andromahi Davlou also testified at the trial. Actress Katia Dandoulaki, during her deposition testimony on November 24, 2022, described that Filippides had developed an obsession with fellow actress Lena Drosaki, who worked with Filippides on the play Murder on the Orient Express at Theatre Katia Dandoulaki.

On November 24, 2022, an executive member of the private broadcaster ANT1, who collaborated with Petros Filippidis on AΝΤ1's Your Face Sounds Familiar, deposed at the trial. She testified that she experienced sexual harassment at the hands Petros Filippidis twice. On January 9, 2023, Petros Filippidis began his deposition at trial.

On January 13, 2023, Mixed Jury Court of Athens Prosecutor Stella Stoya proposed Petros Filippidis be charged with two counts of attempted rape and be acquitted regarding the complaint of rape. On February 8, 2023, the court announced its verdict unanimously, acquitting Petros Filippidis on his serial rape charge, and finding him guilty of two charges of attempted rape.
