= Sakis Boulas =

Greek actor and singer-songwriter (1954–2014)

- Σάκης Μπουλάς
- Born: Athanasios Boulas; 25 September 1954; Kilkis, Greece
- Died: 21 February 2014 (aged 59); Ygeia Hospital, Marousi, Greece
- Resting place: Melissia Cemetery
- Citizenship: Greece
- Occupations: Actor; singer-songwriter; comedian; showman; businessman
- Years active: 1976–2013
- Partner: Alexandra Ousta
- Musical career
- Genres: Rock; éntekhno; pop; laïko
- Instrument: Vocals
- Label: Panik Records

Athanasios Boulas (Greek: Αθανάσιος Μπουλάς; 25 September 1954 – 21 February 2014) was a Greek actor and singer-songwriter. He made several studio albums and wrote songs for other musicians. He also starred in several television shows and films.

== Biography ==
Athanasios Boulas was born on 25 September 1954, in Kilkis, and raised in Piraeus. In 1976 he started out his career as the narrator of the documentary film Arkadi 1866. In 1983 he appeared in the film Dracula of Exarchia, and later that same year took part in the film Bitter Movie.

As a chain smoker, he died of lung cancer on 21 February 2014, at age 59, after days of hospitalization at Ygeia Hospital.
