= List of Greek films of the 2010s =

List of films

A list of notable films produced in Greece in the 2010s (decade).

== 2010s ==
Title	Director	Cast	Genre	Notes
2010
Knifer (Μαχαιροβγάλτης)	Yannis Economides	Vangelis Mourikis	Drama	7 Awards in Hellenic Film Academy Awards
Attenberg	Athina Rachel Tsangari	Ariane Labed	Drama	Volpi Cup in the 67th Venice International Film Festival; 1 Award in Hellenic Film Academy Awards
Hora Proelefsis (Χώρα Προέλευσης)	Syllas Tzoumerkas	Amalia Moutousi	Drama	5 Awards in Hellenic Film Academy Awards
Wog Boy 2: Kings of Mykonos (Ο Βασιλιάς της Μυκόνου)	Peter Andrikidis	Nick Giannopoulos	Comedy	
2011
Alps ('Αλπεις)	Yorgos Lanthimos	Aris Servetalis, Ariane Labed, Angeliki Papoulia	Drama	Golden Osella in 68th Venice International Film Festival
J.A.C.E.	Menelaos Karamaghiolis	Stefania Goulioti	Drama	6 Awards in Hellenic Film Academy Awards
Unfair World ('Αδικος Κόσμος)	Filippos Tsitos	Antonis Kafetzopoulos	Drama	4 Awards in Hellenic Film Academy Awards
Christmas Tango (Το Τανγκό των Χριστουγέννων)	Nikos Koutelidakis	Yannis Bezos	Drama	3 Awards in Hellenic Film Academy Awards
The City of Children (Η Πόλη των Παιδιών)	Giorgos Gikapeppas	Kika Georgiou	Drama	3 Awards in Hellenic Film Academy Awards; Award of Greek Film Critics Association Awards
Man at Sea (Άνθρωπος στη Θάλασσα)	Constantine Giannaris	Antonis Karistinos	Drama	1 Award in Hellenic Film Academy Awards
Paradise (Παράδεισος)	Panagiotis Fafoutis	Natasa Zaga	Romance	2 Awards in Hellenic Film Academy Awards
Super Demetrios (Σούπερ Δημήτριος)	Georgios Papaioannou	Dimitrios Vainas	Comedy	2 Awards in Thessaloniki International Film Festival
Wasted Youth (Χαμένα Νιάτα)	Argyris Papadimitropoulos		Drama	1 Award in Hellenic Film Academy Awards
Red Sky (Κόκκινος Ουρανός)	Laya Yourgou	Apostolis Totsikas	Drama	
Debtocracy	Katerini Kitidi, Aris Chatzistefanou		Documentary	
L (film)	Babis Makridis	Aris Servetalis	Drama	
Magic Hour (2011 film)	Costas kapakas	Renos Haralambidis	Road movie	
Loafing and Camouflage: Sirens at Land	Nikos Perakis	Giannis Tsimitselis	Comedy	
2012
Boy Eating the Bird's Food (Το Αγόρι Τρώει το Φαγητό Ενός Πουλιού)	Ektoras Lygizos		Drama	3 Awards in Hellenic Film Academy Awards
The Daughter (Η Κόρη)	Thanos Anastopoulos	Savina Alimani	Drama	3 Awards in Hellenic Film Academy Awards
God Loves Caviar (Ο Θεός Αγαπάει το Χαβιάρι)	Yannis Smaragdis	Sebastian Koch	Drama	Screened in 2012 Toronto Film Festival
Meteora (Μετέωρα)	Spiros Stathoulopoulos	Theo Alexander	Drama	Entered in 62nd Berlin International Film Festival
An... (Αν)	Christoforos Papakaliatis	Christoforos Papakaliatis, Marina Kalogirou	Drama	1 Award in Hellenic Film Academy Awards
10th Day (10η μέρα)	Vassilis Mazomenos		Drama	Awards in London Greek Film Festival; Special award in Cyprus International Film Festival; Montreal World Film Festival; Fantasporto; Hellenic Film Academy
2013
Little England (Μικρά Αγγλία)	Pantelis Voulgaris		Drama	6 Awards in Hellenic Film Academy Awards; 3 Awards in Shanghai International Film Festival
Miss Violence	Alexander Avranas		Drama	Silver Lion and Volpi Cup in 70th Venice International Film Festival; 2 Awards in Hellenic Film Academy Awards
The Eternal Return of Antonis Paraskevas (Η Αιώνια Επιστροφή του Αντώνη Παρασκευά)	Elina Psikou	Christos Stergioglou	Drama	1 Award in Hellenic Film Academy Awards
September (Σεπτέμβριος)	Penny Panayotopoulou	Kora Karvouni	Drama	1 Award in Hellenic Film Academy Awards
2014
Xenia	Panos H. Koutras	Kostas Nikouli, Nikos Gelia	Drama	6 Awards in Hellenic Film Academy Awards
Stratos (Το Μικρό Ψάρι)	Yannis Economides	Vangelis Mourikis, Vicky Papadopoulou	Drama	4 Awards in Hellenic Film Academy Awards
A Blast (Η Έκρηξη)	Syllas Tzoumerkas	Angeliki Papoulia	Drama	International Competition Locarno International Film Festival
2015
The Lobster	Yorgos Lanthimos	Colin Farrell, Rachel Weisz	Drama	Jury Award in 2015 Cannes Film Festival
Tetarti 04:45	Alexis Alexiou	Stelios Mainas	Drama, Crime	9 Awards in Hellenic Film Academy Awards
Chevalier	Athina Rachel Tsangari		Comedy	International Competition Locarno International Film Festival
Worlds Apart	Christoforos Papakaliatis	J. K. Simmons	Drama	
2016
Glory	Kristina Grozeva, Petar Valchanov	Stefan Denolyubov, Margita Gosheva	Drama	A Bulgarian-Greek coproduction. Hamptons International Film Festival Award for Best Narrative Feature Film
Suntan	Argyris Papadimitropoulos	Makis Papadimitriou, Elli Tringou	Drama	Best International Feature Film at the Edinburgh International Film Festival
Lines (Lines)	Vassilis Mazomenos		Drama	World premiere at the Tallinn Black Nights Film Festival; Best director at Maverick Movie Awards; Hellenic Film Academy
2017
Polyxeni	Dora Masklavanou	Lydia Fotopoulou, Katia Goulioni, Akilas Karazisis	Drama	
The Other Me	Sotiris Tsafoulias	Pigmalion Dadakaridis, Dimitris Kataleifos	Crime, mystery	1 Award in Hellenic Film Academy Awards
Amerika Square	Yannis Sakaridis	Yannis Stankoglou	Drama	1 Award in Hellenic Film Academy Awards
2018
Still River	Angelos Frantzis	Katia Goulioni, Andreas Konstantinou	Thriller, Drama	
The Last Note	Pantelis Voulgaris	Andreas Konstantinou	Drama	2 Awards in Hellenic Film Academy Awards
