= Hellenic Film Academy Awards =

Annual Greek cinema awards

- Location: Athens, Greece
- Predecessor: Greek State Film Awards
- Founded: 2010
- Language: Greek
- Website: hellenicfilmacademy.gr

The Hellenic Film Academy Awards or Hellenic Iris Awards are a set of awards given annually by the Hellenic Film Academy for excellence of cinematic achievements in Greek cinema, replacing the abolished Greek State Film Awards. On May 3, 2010, the first awards ceremony was presented at the Athens Concert Hall. Since 2016, the awards have been renamed Iris Awards.

== Hellenic Film Awards ==
=== Best Film ===
Season	Best Film	Sources
2010	Dogtooth	
2011	Knifer	
2012	Unfair World	
2013	Boy Eating the Bird's Food	
2014	Little England	
2015	Xenia	
2016	Tetarti 04:45	
2017	Suntan	
2018	Son of Sofia	
2019	Pity	
2020	Eftychia	
2021	Digger	
2022	Magnetic Fields	
2023	Behind the Haystacks	
2024	Animal	
2025	Arcadia	
2026	Patty Is Such a Girly Name	

=== Best Director ===
Season	Best Director
2010	Yorgos Lanthimos for Dogtooth
2011	Yannis Economides for Knifer
2012	Filippos Tsitos for Unfair World
2013	Thanos Anastopoulos for The Daughter
2014	Yorgos Tsemberopoulos for The Enemy Within
2015	Panos H. Koutras for Xenia
2016	Alexis Alexiou for Tetarti 04:45
2017	Argyris Papadimitropoulos for Suntan
2018	Elina Psykou for Son of Sofia
2019	Angelos Frantzis for Still River
2020	Syllas Tzoumerkas for The Miracle of the Sargasso Sea
2021	Georgis Grigorgakis for Digger
2022	Araceli Lemos for Holy Emy
2023	Asimina Proedrou for Piso apo tis thimonies
2024	Sofia Exarchou for Animal
2025	Yorgos Zois for Arcadia

=== Best First Film Director ===
Season	Best First Film Director
2010	Argyris Papadimitropoulos for Bank Bang
2011	Syllas Tzoumerkas for Homeland
2012	Elias Demetriou for Fish n' Chips
2013	Ektoras Lygizos for Boy Eating the Bird's Food
2014	Elina Psykou for The Eternal Return of Antonis Paraskevas
2015	Yannis Veslemes for Norway
2016	Evangelia Kranioti for Exotica, Erotica etc and Yorgos Zois for Interruption
2017	Sofia Exarchou for Park
2018	Lefteris Charitos for Dolphin Man
2019	Nikos Labôt for Her Job
2020	Rinio Dragasaki for Cosmic Candy
2021	Georgis Grigorakis for Digger
2022	George Gousis for Magnetic Fields
2023	Asimina Proedrou for Piso apo tis thimonies
2024	Vasilis Katsoupis for Inside
2025	Kostis Charamountanis for Kyuka: Before Summer's End

=== Best Screenwriter ===
Season	Best Screenwriter
2010	Efthymis Filippou and Yorgos Lanthimos for Dogtooth
2011	Yannis Economides for Knifer
2012	Yorgos Gikapeppas for The City of Children
2013	Thanos Anastopoulos for The Daughter
2014	Giannis Tsiros for The Enemy Within
2015	Panagiotis Evangelidis and Panos H. Koutras for Xenia
2016	Athina Rachel Tsangari for Chevalier
2017	Argyris Papadimitropoulos and Syllas Tzoumerkas for Suntan
2018	Elina Psykou for Son of Sofia
2019	Marios Piperides for Smuggling Hendrix
2020	Zacharias Mavroidis for Defunct
2021	Georgis Grigorakis for Digger
2022	Yorgos Goussis, Antonis Tsiotsiopoulos and Elena Topalidou for Magnitika pedia
2023	Asimina Proedrou for Piso apo tis thimonies
2024	Sofia Exarchou for Animal
2025	Yorgos Zois and Konstantina Kotzamani for Arcadia

=== Best Actor ===
Season	Best Actor
2010	Antonis Kafetzopoulos for Plato's Academy
2011	Argyris Xafis for Ap' ta kokala vgalmena
2012	Antonis Kafetzopoulos for Unfair World
2013	Yannis Papadopoulos for Boy Eating the Bird's Food
2014	Themis Panou for Miss Violence
2015	Vangelis Mourikis for Stratos
2016	Stelios Mainas for Tetarti 04:45
2017	Makis Papadimitriou for Suntan
2018	Andreas Konstantinou for The Last Note
2019	Aris Servetalis for The Waiter
2020	Pigmalion Dadakaridis for Eftychia
2021	Vangelis Mourikis for Digger
2022	Lazaros Georgakopoulos for Moon, 66 Questions
2023	Stathis Stamoulakatos for Piso apo tis thimonies
2024	Willem Dafoe for Inside
2025	Kostas Nikouli for Kreas

=== Best Actress ===
Season	Best Actress
2010	Mina Orfanou for Strella
2011	Ariane Labed for Attenberg
2012	Kika Georgiou for The City of Children
2013	Amalia Moutoussi for Hara
2014	Kora Karvouni for September
2015	Maria Kallimani for Sto Spiti
2016	Evangelia Andreadaki for Smac
2017	Sofia Kokkali for Nima
2018	Katia Goulioni for Polyxeni
2019	Marisha Triantafyllidou for Her Job
2020	Angeliki Papoulia for The Miracle of the Sargasso Sea
2021	Malika Foroutan for Pari
2022	Elena Topalidou for Magnetic Fields
2023	Eleni Kokkidou for Black Stone
2024	Dimitra Vlagopoulou for Animal
2025	Elsa Lekakou for Kyuka: Before Summer's End

=== Best Supporting Actor ===
Season	Best Supporting Actor
2010	Christos Passalis for Dogtooth
2011	Dimitris Imellos for Ap' ta kokkala vgalmena
2012	Christos Stergioglou for Unfair World
2013	Ieronimos Kaletsanos for J.A.C.E
2014	Nikos Georgakis for Standing Aside Watching
2015	Angelos Papadimitriou for Xenia
2016	Minas Hatzisavvas for Worlds Apart
2017	Themis Panou for Notias
2018	Thanasis Papageorgiou for Son of Sofia
2019	Yannis Stankoglou for The Waiter
2020	Thanos Tokakis for Eftychia
2021	Stathis Stamoulakatos for Prostimo
2022	Aris Servetalis for Herd of Sheep
2023	Christos Kontogeorgis for Behind the haystacks
2024	Vasilis Kolovos for Development
2025	Julio Katsis for Agapouse ta louloudia perissotero

=== Best Supporting Actress ===
Season	Best Supporting Actress
2010	Anna Mascha for Chrisoskoni
2011	Ioanna Tsirigouli for Homeland
2012	Olia Lazaridou for Paradise
2013	Kora Karvouni for J.A.C.E
2014	Reni Pittaki for Miss Violence
2015	Vicky Papadopoulou for Stratos
2016	Vassiliki Troufakou for Cloudy Sunday
2017	Elli Tringou for Suntan
2018	Lydia Fotopoulou for Polyxeni
2019	Maria Filini for Her Job
2020	Katia Goulioni for Eftychia
2021	Vasiliki Kallimani for I Balada tis Trypias Kardias
2022	Hasmine Killip for Holy Emy
2024	Flomaria Papadaki for Animal
2025	Klelia Renesi for Stelios
2026	Gioula Boudali for Patty Is Such a Girly Name
2026	Betty Arvaniti for Broken Vein

=== Best Cinematography ===
Season	Best Cinematography
2010	Marcus Waterloo for Black Field
2011	Dimitris Katsaitis for Knifer
2012	Angelos Viskadourakis and Yorgos Argyroiliopoulos for Man at Sea
2013	Ilias Adamis for The Daughter
2014	Simos Sakertzis for Little England
2015	Kostas Gikas for Forever
2016	Christos Karamanis for Tetarti 04:45
2017	Christos Karamanis for Suntan
2018	Claudio Bolivar for Polyxeni
2019	Simon Beaufils for Still River
2020	Christina Moumouri for Zizotek
2021	Yorgos Karvelas for Digger
2024	Panagiotis Vasilakis for Murderess

=== Best Music ===
Season	Best Music
2010	Giannis Aggelakas for Psyhi Vathia
2011	drog_A_tek for Homeland
2012	Yannis Aiolou for Christmas Tango
2013	Stavros Gasparatos for Aima
2014	Alexander Voulgaris (The Boy) for The Sentimentalists
2015	Babis Papadopoulos for Stratos and Yannis Veslemes for Norvigia
2016	Yannis Veslemes for Tetarti 04:45
2017	drog_A_Tek for Spring Awakening
2018	Nikos Kypourgos for Polyxeni
2019	Coti K. for The Waiter
2020	Alexander Voulgaris (The Boy) and Despinis Trichromi for Winona
2021	Nikos Kypourgos for O Raftis
2024	Dimitris Papadimitriou for Murderess

=== Best Editing ===
Season	Best Editing
2010	Yorgos Mavropsaridis for Dogtooth
2011	Yannis Chalkiadakis for Knifer, Ioanna Spiliopoulou for Ap' ta kokkala vgalmena, Panos Voutsaras for Homeland
2012	Yannis Chalkiadakis for Wasted Youth
2013	Stella Fillipopoulou for An... and Takis Yannopoulos, Panos Daoultzis & Lambis Haralambidis for J.A.C.E
2014	Yorgos Mavropsaridis for The Enemy Within
2015	Yorgos Lambrinos for Xenia
2016	Lambis Charalambidis for Tetarti 04:45
2017	Yannis Sakaridis for Amerika Square
2018	Lambis Charalambidis for Do It Yourself
2019	Yorgos Lambrinos for Obscuro Barroco
2020	Nikos Pastras for Winona
2021	Panos Voutsaras for Pari

=== Best Production Design / Art Direction ===
Season	Best Production Design
2010	Pinelopi Valti for Strella
2011	Ioulia Stavridou for Knifer
2012	Giorgos Georgiou for Christmas Tango
2013	Ilias Ledakis for J.A.C.E
2014	Adonis Dagklidis for Little England
2015	Yannis Veslemes for Norway
2016	Spyros Laskaris for Tetarti 04:45
2017	Spyros Laskaris for Notias

=== Best Costume Design ===
Season	Best Costumes Design
2010	Vassilis Barbarigos for Strella
2011	Giorgos Georgiou for Taxidi sti Mytilini
2012	Giorgos Georgiou for Christmas Tango
2013	Despina Himona for J.A.C.E
2014	Gioula Zoiopoulou for Little England
2015	Vassilis Barbarigos for Xenia
2016	Anna Mahairianaki for Cloudy Sunday
2017	Gioula Zoiopoulou for I Roza tis Smyrnis

=== Best Sound ===
Season	Best Sound
2010	Stefanos Efthymiou, Dimitris Voutsas, Panos Voutsaras, Costas Varybopiotis for Psyhi Vathia
2011	Dinos Kittou, Costas Fylaktidis for Knifer
2012	Aris Louziotis, Alexandros Sidiropoulos, Panos Voutsaras, Costas Varybopiotis for Paradise
2013	Marinos Athanassopoulos, Aris Louziotis, Alexandros Sidiropoulos, Costas Varybopiotis for An...
2014	Stefanos Efthimiou, Kostas Varimpopiotis, Takis Giannopoulos for Little England
2015	Ntinos Kittou, William Frank, Kostas Fylaktisid for Stratos
2016	Aris Athanasopoulos, Gil Toren, Avi Mizrahie for Tetarti 04:45
2017	Stefanos Efthimiou, Kostas Varimpopiotis, Persefoni Miliou, Valia Tserou for Park

=== Best Make-up ===
Season	Best Make-up
2010	Apollonia B., Mary Stavrakaki Strella
2011	Evi Zafiropoulou for Homeland
2012	Katerina Varthalitou for To Gala
2013	Yannis Pamoukis for J.A.C.E
2014	Efi Zafiropoulou for Little England
2015	Dora Nazou for Norvigia
2016	Nabil Salame for Cloudy Sunday
2017	Katerina Varthalitou for Notias

=== Best Special & Visual Effects ===
Season	Best Special & Visual Effects
2010	Petros Nousias for To Kako stin Epohi ton Iroon
2011	Nikos Moutselos for I Ypografi
2012	Yorgos Alahouzos, Argyris Alahouzos for The City of Children
2013	Vassilis Andriopoulos, Yorgos Alahouzos, Argyris Alahouzos, Yannis Vamvakas, Dimitris Gerpinis for Demeni, Kokkini Klosti
2014	Aggelos Spartalis for From the Earth to the Moon
2015	Roulis Alahouzos, Ionas Katrazanos, Phokion Xenos for Norvigia
2016	Roulis Alahouzos, Ippokratis Halas for Tetarti 04:45
2017	Yorgos Alahouzos, Argyris Alahouzos for The Other Me

=== Best Documentary Film ===
Season	Best Documentary Film
2010	Allos Dromos Den Ypirhe by Stavros Psyllakis
2011	Ta Paidia Paizei by Rea Apostolidou, Yuri Averov
2012	Raw Material by Christos Karakepelis
2013	Imerologia Amnisias by Stella Theodoraki
2014	Glow in the Dark by Panagiotis Evaggelidis
2015	Mia Oikogeneiaki Ypothesi by Angeliki Aristomenopoulou
2016	Exotica, Erotica etc. by Evangelia Kranioti
2017	The Last Beach by Thanos Anastopoulos
2018	Dolphin Man by Lefteris Charitos
2019	Obscuro Barocco by Evangelia Kranioti
2020	When Wagner Met Tomatoes by Marianna Ikonomou
2021	Unknown Athenians by Angeliki Antoniou

=== Best Short Documentary ===
Season	Best Short Documentary
2019	Tetartos toixos by Dimitris Gkotsis
2020	The Arm Wrestler by Giorgos Goussis
2021	Teo, My Neighbor by Christos Karteris
2022	Latin Noir by Andreas Apostolidis, Rea Apostolidis, Yuri Averof
2023	Mnimi me oura by Dimitris Indares
2024	Light of Light by Neritan Zinxhiria

=== Best Short Film ===
Season	Best Short Film
2010	And Me for Myself by Georgis Grigorakis
2011	Casus Belli by Yorgos Zois
2012	My Dad, Lenin and Freddy by Rinio Dragassaki
2013	Chamomile by Neritan Zinxhiria
2014	Washingtonia by Konstantina Kotzamani
2015	Volta by Stella Kyriakopoulou
2016	Fig by Nicolas Kolovos
2017	Limbo by Konstantina Kotzamani
2018	Copa Loca by Christos Massalas
2019	Hector Malo - The Last Day of the Year by Jacqueline Lentzou
2020	Electric Swan by Konstantina Kotzamani
2021	Bella by Thelyia Petraki

=== Honorary Award ===
Season	Honorary Award
2010	Thanasis Veggos, actor and director
2011	Michalis Cacoyannis, director
2012	Attikon, cinema in Athens
2013	Zoi Laskari, actress
2014	Yorgos Stamou, post-production laboratory manager
2015	Fanny Ardant, actress
2016	Vanessa Redgrave, actress
2017	Kostas Voutsas, actor
2018	Alexandre Desplat, composer
2019	not given
2020	not given
2021	Mary Chronopoulou, actress, and Yannis Papadakis, grip

== See also ==
- Greek Film Critics Association Awards
- Greek State Film Awards
- Thessaloniki International Film Festival
