= Hellenic Film Academy =

The Hellenic Film Academy (HFA) (Greek: Ελληνική Ακαδημία Κινηματογράφου) is an initiative of a group of Greek filmmakers. HFA presents the annual Hellenic Film Academy Awards ceremony, awarding the best films of Greek cinema of the last year.

The Hellenic Film Academy was founded in November 2009 by a group of active film professionals of Greek cinema, involved in the Filmmakers Of Greece movement demanding a new Greek film law. Through a series of events that shook the Greek film world, the Hellenic Film Academy Awards replaced the defamed Greek State Film Awards, held by the Greek Ministry of Culture, that since ceased to exist.

The founding members were 108 Greek filmmakers, producers, film critics, technicians, screenwriters and actors. Greek filmmaker Tasos Boulmetis was elected the first president of the Hellenic Film Academy. When it was founded, honorary members of the academy were the filmmakers Costa Gavras, Nikos Koundouros, Michalis Cacoyannis, Dinos Katsouridis and the actress Olympia Dukakis. As of 2021, the members of the Hellenic Film Academy members are 550 (eligible producers, directors, actors, screenwriters, directors of photography, editors, production designers, costume designers, film music composers, hair and make-up designers, sound recordists, sound designers and sound re-recording mixers, VFX and SFX designers, film critics, film academics, among others). Honorary members include Jim Gianopulos, Irene Papas, Elie Castiel, Achilleas Kyriakidis and Michel Dimopoulos.

Ιn 2012 and 2013, HFA in collaboration with the Onassis Foundation, organised the event Riding the Greek Wave, two consecutive conferences and workshops on further enhancing the international outreach of Greek cinema, with guests from the international film industry.

In 2016, the Hellenic Film Academy Award was officially named as the 'Iris'.

The Honorary Award of the Hellenic Film Academy has been rewarded to actors Thanassis Veggos, Zoi Laskari, Fanny Ardant, Vanessa Redgrave, Kostas Voutsas and Mary Chronopoulou; director Michael Cacoyannis; Attikon cinema; lab manager Yorgos Stamos; film composer Alexandre Desplat; and grip Yannis Papadakis.

The Hellenic Film Academy is a member of the Film Academy Network of Europe. It annually organises the Film Factory, a series of workshops for professionals and students, held by the winners of the previous year's awards. It collaborates with the EFA at the annual European Young Audience Awards and collaborates with the Césars for the Golden Nights event. Every year, the HFA makes an official, public proposal to the Greek Ministry of Culture for which film Greece should submit to the American Academy Awards.

In 2021, the HFA presented under the auspices of the Greece 2021 Committee, Motherland, I See You - The Twentieth Century of Greek Cinema, an initiative dedicated to salvaging, preserving, screening and studying films from the diverse Greek heritage of the 20th Century, in the context of the 200-year anniversary since the Greek Revolution. The restoration program and moving festival premiered at the Athens Epidaurus Festival in September 2021. It was sponsored by EKOME, the National Centre of Audiovisual Media & Communication, the Greek Film Centre, the Athens Epidaurus Festival, the Thessaloniki International Film Festival, with the collaboration of the Greek Film Archive.

== Αwards ceremony ==
On May 3, 2010, the first Hellenic Film Academy Awards Ceremony was presented at the Athens Concert Hall. The following year and since, the Hellenic Film Academy Awards Ceremony has been regularly presented at the Onassis Stegi Hall in Athens and televised or streamed through various media. Due to the COVID-19 restrictions, the announcement of the 2020 Awards were held without an audience and broadcast live via streaming. The following year, the 2021 Awards Ceremony took place as a physical event at the Park open-air theatre, streamed via Onassis Stegi.

== Award winners in main categories ==
=== Best Film ===
Dogtooth by Yorgos Lanthimos (2010); Knifer by Yannis Economidis (2011); Unfair World by Filippos Tsitos (2012); Boy Eating the Bird's Food by Ektoras Lygizos (2013); Little England by Pantelis Voulgaris (2014); Xenia by Panos Koutras (2015); Tetarti 04:45 by Alexis Alexiou (2016); Suntan by Argyris Papadimitropoulos (2017); Son of Sofia by Elina Psykou (2018); Pity by Babis Makridis (2019); Eftychia by Angelos Frantzis (2020); Digger by Georgis Grigorakis (2021).

=== Best Director ===
Yorgos Lanthimos, Dogtooth (2010); Yannis Economidis, Knifer (2011); Filippos Tsitos, Unfair World (2012); Thanos Anastopoulos, The Daughter (2013); Yorgos Tsemberopoulos, The Enemy Within (2014); Panos Koutras, Xenia (2015); Alexis Alexiou, Tetarti 04:45 (2016); Argyris Papadimitropoulos, Suntan (2017); Elina Psykou, Son of Sofia (2018); Angelos Frantzis, Still River (2019); Syllas Tzoumerkas, The Miracle of the Sargasso Sea (2020); Georgis Grigorakis, Digger (2021).

=== Best Actor ===
Antonis Kafetzopoulos, Plato's Academy (2010); Argyris Xafis, Ap' ta Kokala Vgalmena (2011); Antonis Kafetzopoulos, Unfair World (2012); Yannis Papadopoulos, Boy Eating the Bird's Food (2013); Themis Panou, Miss Violence (2014); Vangelis Mourikis, Stratos (2015); Stelios Mainas, Tetarti 04:45 (2016); Makis Papadimitriou, Suntan (2017); Andreas Konstantinou, The Last Note (2018); Aris Servetalis, The Waiter (2019); Pygmalion Dadakaridis, Eftychia (2020); Vangelis Mourikis, Digger (2021).

=== Best Actress ===
Mina Orfanou, Strella (2010); Ariane Labed, Attenberg (2011); Kika Georgiou, The CIty of Children (2012); Amalia Moutoussi, Hara (2013); Kora Karvouni, September (2014); Maria Kallimani, Sto Spiti (2015); Evangelia Andreadaki, Smac (2016); Sofia Kokkali, Nima (2017); Katia Goulioni, Polyxeni (2018); Marisha Triantafyllidou, Her Job (2019); Angeliki Papoulia, The Miracle of the Sargasso Sea (2020); Malika Foroutan, Pari (2021).

== See also ==
- Cinema of Greece
