= Edinburgh Greek Festival =

- Dates: 2001-present
- Frequency: annual
- Location: Edinburgh
- Website: http://www.edinburghgreekfestival.com/

The Edinburgh Greek Festival is a festival of Greek film and one of the cultural festivals in Edinburgh. Its organisation involves individuals from Southern Europe. It is an international festival that features mostly Greek films or films about Greece.

== History and collaboration ==
The Edinburgh Greek Film Festival was launched in 2001. It has subsequently run almost on an annual basis until 2018 except for 2012 and 2013. It has been run in collaboration with Edinburgh Filmhouse, which has been its venue from the beginning.

Because of organisational changes a Trust was established in 2010 to run the Festival and registered with the Office of the Scottish Charity Regulator OSCR.

The 2014 Festival was part-funded by Creative Scotland.

== Activities ==
The Festival has featured the work of numerous Greek directors. It has presented retrospectives on the work of directors, such as Nikos Panayiotopoulos in 2001, Theo Angelopoulos in 2006, Michael Cacoyannis in 2009 and Pantelis Voulgaris in 2011.

A series of historical films were shown addressing the 1930s-1950s, including Little England in 2015 or The Last Note in 2018, both directed by Pantelis Voulgaris. Similarly, the Festival screened Cloudy Sunday by Manousos Manousakis in 2016. The film refers to Salonica in 1942, when the city was under German occupation. It addresses the love story of a Jewish woman and a Gentile man.

In 2014, films such as Jules Dassin’s The Rehearsal on the Athens Polytechnic Uprising were programmed alongside films on contemporary issues. Examples of the latter films were the Enemy Within, directed by Yorgos Tsemperopoulos and Alexandros Avranas’ Miss Violence, both of which criticise patriarchal norms. The Festival also screened in 2014 All Cats are Brilliant by Konstantina Voulgaris, a family drama situated in a society in crisis. Similarly, in showing films addressing contemporary problems in Greece, the Festival screened in 2017 the film entitled Amerika Square, directed by Yannis Sakaridis, which addresses contemporary racism in Greece.

The work of the recent New Wave had already been featured through the work of Yorgos Lanthimos and was prominent in the 2015 programme.

Some directors have attended and delivered seminars on their work. For example, Yorgos Tsemperopoulos held a 2-hour seminar at the University of Edinburgh in 2014 as part of the Festival activities. Similarly, some directors participate in Q&A sessions after the screening of their films. For instance, in 2016, Argyris Papadimitropoulos did so after his film Suntan was shown. At the 2016 Festival, a Q&A session also followed the screening of Short Fuse and involved its co-screenwriter Kostas Skiftas and producer/co-screenwriter Konstantinos Moutsinas. In that year, director Ken McMullen and producer Martin McQuillan took questions after the screening of their film ΟΧΙ: An Act of Resistance.
