= Vassilis Koukalani =

Iranian-Greek actor (born 1969)

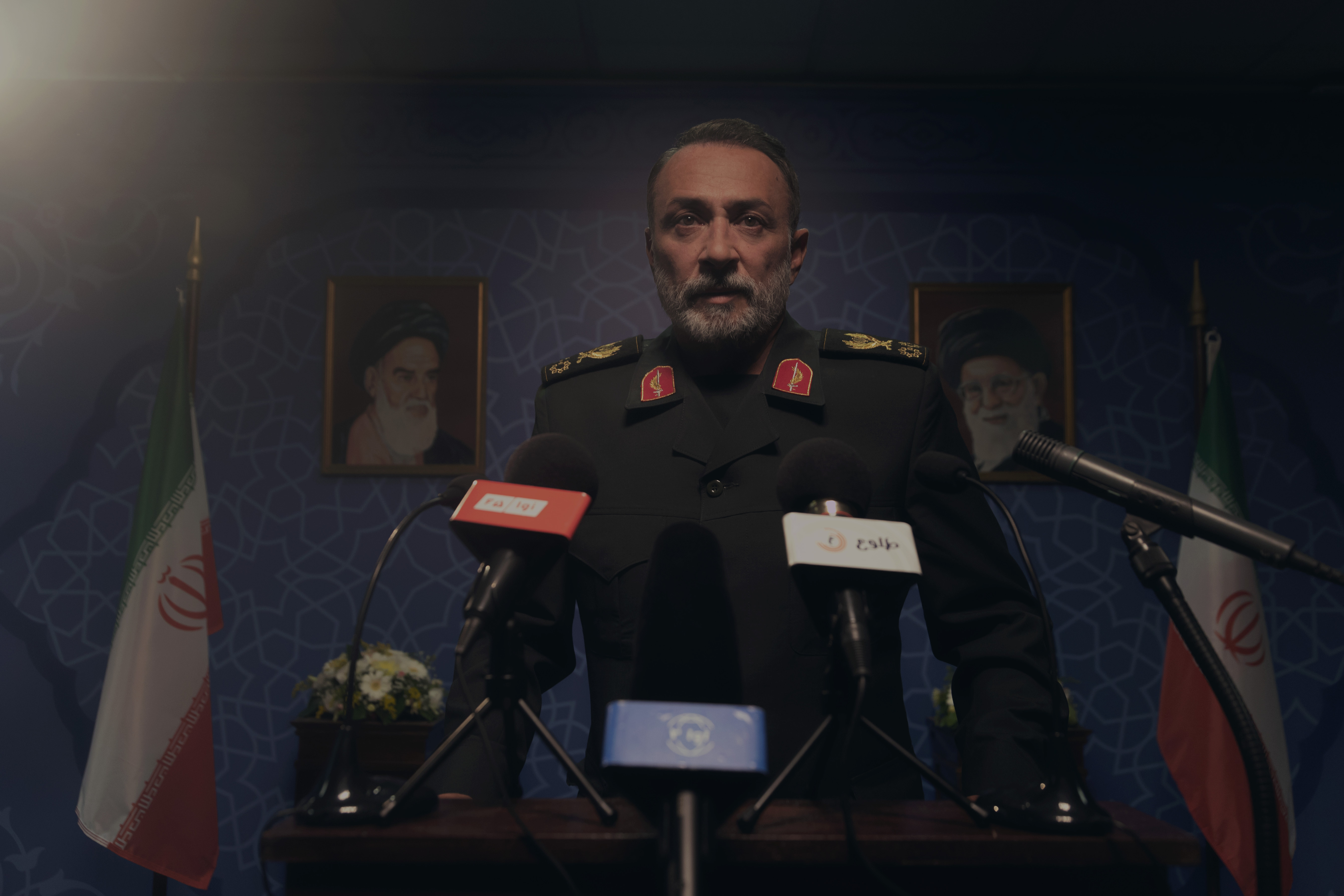
- Koukalani as Sardar Qasem Mohammadi in Tehran
- Born: 1969 (age 56–57); Cologne, West Germany
- Citizenship: Iran Germany
- Education: German School of Athens; American Academy of Dramatic Arts
- Occupation: Actor
- Years active: 1999–present

Vassilis Koukalani (Persian: واسیلیس کوکلانی) is an Iranian actor.

== Career ==
He was born in Cologne, West Germany, to an Iranian father and Greek mother in 1969. He immigrated from Tehran to Athens in 1980.

== Filmography ==
=== Film ===
Year	Title	Role	Notes
1999	I listeia	Kostas	
2004	Nyfes		
2005	Csudafilm		
2005	Agrypnia		
2008	Without	Arab Fare Dodger	
2010	Ta oporofora tis Athinas	Man in the street (uncredited)	
2011	Ap' ta kokala vgalmena	Archbishop's Driver	
2012	A Green Story	Greek Man	
2012	10i mera	Driver	
2013	Miss Violence	Man in the Laundry Store	
2014	Red Rose	Ali	
2015	One Breath	Tourist Office Director	
2016	Amerika Square	Tarek	
2017	The Last Note	Sarantos	
2017	Approach	Jalal	
2017	Polyxeni	Legal Officer	
2019	I Will Cross Tomorrow	Deniz Gürkan	
2020	Pari	Mr. Bagheri	
2020	Daniel '16	Stavros	
2021	The Lost Daughter	Maurice	
2023	Kandahar	Bashar Hamadani	
2024	The Hunted	Malek	
2024	Sixty Minutes	Marco Bergmann	
2024	It's a Good Day to Die	Uncle Adam	
2024	Cafe 404	Mob Boss	

=== Television ===
Year	Title	Role	Notes
1999	...kai epi gis eirini	Milkos	Television film
2000	Georgios Vizyinos: I siopi ton angelon		TV series
2008	O pseftis pappous		Episode #1.11
2018	Dengler		Episode: "Fremde Wasser"
2020–2022	Tehran	Qasem Mohammadi	12 episodes
2021	Homicide Unit Istanbul	Christos Papadopoulos	Episode: "Entscheidung in Athen"
2021–2022	Commandos and Dragons	Stelios Anastasakis	10 episodes; Greek title: Κομάντα και Δράκοι
2022	Aoratoi	Savvas	3 episodes
2023	To proxenio tis Ioulias	Nikolas Skoutaris	2 episodes
2023–2024	Sote		8 episodes
