= Man of God (2021 film) =

- Directed by: Yelena Popovic
- Written by: Yelena Popovic
- Produced by: Alexandros Potter; Yelena Popovic
- Starring: Aris Servetalis; Mickey Rourke; Alexander Petrov
- Music by: Zbigniew Preisner
- Production companies: Simeon Entertainment; View Master Films
- Distributed by: Pinnacle Peak Pictures
- Release dates: 25 April 2021 (Moscow); 21 March 2022 (United States)
- Running time: 111 minutes
- Country: Greece
- Language: English
- Box office: $1.6 million

Man of God (Greek: Ο Άνθρωπος του Θεού) is a 2021 English-language Greek biographical drama film written and directed by Yelena Popovic, and starring Aris Servetalis as Nectarios of Aegina and also starring Mickey Rourke and Alexander Petrov.

== Plot ==
The film follows the later life of Saint Nectarios of Aegina, a Greek Orthodox cleric serving as the Metropolitan bishop of Pentapolis in Egypt. His popularity among the public and reputation for piety arouse jealousy within the higher ranks of the Alexandrian clergy, who accuse him of ambition and seek his dismissal. As a result, he is removed from his post and returns to Greece.

In Athens, Nectarios of Aegina is appointed director of the Rizarios Ecclesiastical School, where he gains respect from his students for his modest lifestyle and dedication to teaching. Despite his efforts to serve both the Church and the public, he continues to face accusations and suspicion from church authorities. The film depicts his growing isolation as he endures slander and administrative hostility.

In his later years, Nectarios withdraws to the island of Aegina, where he assists in rebuilding a convent and devotes his remaining time to prayer and writing. The narrative concludes with his illness, death, and the veneration that follows, reflecting his later recognition as a saint of the Eastern Orthodox Church.

== Cast ==
- Aris Servetalis as Nectarios of Aegina
- Mickey Rourke as Paralyzed Man
- Alexander Petrov as Kostas
- Tonia Sotiropoulou as Maria
- Babis Hawk Konstantinou as Rich man
- Constantin Symsiris as Prosecutor clerk
- Giannis Stankoglou as Spiros
- Manos Gavras as Yannis
- Christos Loulis as Christos
- Kitty Paitazoglou as Nun Akakia
- Samuel Akinola as Baker
- Michalis Ikonomou as Vassili
- Dimitra Mesimerli as Client
- Karyofyllia Karabeti as Voula
- Alexandros Mylonas as Metropolitan Meletius
- Pavlos Kourtidis as Raggedy Man
- Lefteris Tsatsis as Hermit
- Yannis Anastasakis as Metropolitan Theoklitos
- Vera Letizia Muratova as Chrisafenia
- Nikitas Tsakiroglou as Patriarch Sophronius IV of Alexandria
- Onoufrios Dovletis as Villager (credit only)
- Mario Lazaridis as Deacon
- Sarantis Geogleris as Gregory
- Petra Mavridi as Confessor woman
- Konstantinos Kladis as Fisherman

== Production ==
Principal photography wrapped in Greece in September 2020.

== Release ==
The film made its world premiere on 25 April 2021 at the Moscow International Film Festival, where it won the Audience Award. It was then released in theaters on 26 August 2021. In its first four consecutive weeks, the film sold 241,014 tickets in Greece. It was the third most commercially successful film in Greece for 2021, with 283,520 ticket sold.
