= Cloudy Sunday (film) =

- Directed by: Manousos Manousakis
- Starring: Andreas Konstantinou; Haris Fragoulis
- Release date: 3 December 2015
- Running time: 116 minutes
- Country: Greece
- Languages: Greek; German; Judaeo-Spanish

Cloudy Sunday (in Greek: Ουζερί Τσιτσάνης, Ouzeri Tsitsanis) is a 2015 Greek drama film directed by Manousos Manousakis. The film is set during the occupation of Thessaloniki, Greece's second largest city and home to the largest population of Jews in Greece, by Nazi Germany during WWII. The German occupation of Thessaloniki in WWII, including the deportation of the city's Jews to Auschwitz and Bergen-Belsen. Vassilis Tsitsanis was a famous musician (song writer and bouzouki player) who owned a cafe like that prominent in the film, but his role with respect to the resistance, fictionally dramatized in the movie, is not known. The choir and bouzouki music are wonderful.

== Cast ==
- Andreas Konstantinou - Vassilis Tsitsanis
- Haris Fragoulis - Giorgos Samaras
- Christina Hilla Fameli - Estrea Beza
- Vasiliki Troufakou - Lela (Lambrini)
- Yannis Stankoglou - Jaco Beza
- Gerasimos Skiadaresis - Yannis
