= Maria Lioudaki =

Greek educator, folklorist, and resistance fighter

Maria Lioudaki (22 November 1894 – 4 December 1947) was a Greek educator, folklorist, and resistance fighter. She promoted social action in Lasithi with her friend, Maria Drandaki (1914–1947), with whom she was arrested and killed during the Greek Civil War.

== Personal life ==
Lioudaki was born on 22 November 1894, in Latsida of Apano Mirabello, in the countryside of Crete (at the time part of the Ottoman Empire) to farmer Georgios Lioudakis and Aikaterini Papazachariadi (maiden name), and was the oldest of their 8 children. Growing up in a rural family, she experienced the sounds of the "Mantinadas" in the fields at work, in social gatherings, in dances; with emotional devotion.

== Education ==
She studied at the Girls' School of Naples and in 1908, immediately after graduation at the age of 14, began her career as a sub-teacher at the primary school of Kritsa. She also taught at Agios Georgios in Lassithi and at Fourni Mirabellou from 1912 to 1914.

In 1914 she graduated with honors from the School of Heraklion. From 1925–1927, after successfully passing her examinations, she studied at the University of Athens. In her postgraduate studies she was taught by Manolis Triantafyllidis, Dimitris Glinos, and Alexandros Delmouzos who instilled in her the idea of educational reform, including giving education to all social classes.

Triantafyllidis distinguished Lioudaki for her spiritual interests and introduced her to Folklore. Triantaphyllides also supported and instilled in Lioudaki the then-new ideas of educational reform. She received her postgraduate degree with honors.

== Career ==
After graduating, from 1927–1937, she took over as Principal of the Girls' School of Ierapetra which was housed in the old Turkish school in Mehtepi. She sought to fix the school, which was in a miserable state and put the schoolgirls in danger. She complained about the poor condition of the building, and in 1929, sent a letter to the parents, who were mostly workers, fishermen, and farmers, saying. "Make sure you find your masters, move, work for your children." She shared her food with the poorest children in the school, and conducted extra classes without pay.

In Lioudaki's writings, lectures, and teaching spread Greek language and literature with the aim of communicating and educating the poor, contributing to the struggle for their spiritual upliftment. She translated Sophocles' play Electra into a measured elementary school play, presented in 1929 by the students of Ierapetra High School. At the same time she took part in the trade union struggles: to improve the position of teachers and to provide a better Education to the children of the people.

"Man must be educated, and education does not distinguish in society between young and old, high and low. He who is educated is not a coward in front of the supposed superiors and does not torture his inferiors. An educated person is one who puts himself in second place to serve his neighbor. Educated is the man who suffers for their sorrow and rejoices for their joy. Education is something divine, he is the god who dwells in us."

At the same time, she was also financially supporting her family including her siblings' educations and her youngest sister Hara's fiancé Napoleon Soukatzidis.

=== Folklore ===
Apart from being a teacher, Maria Lioudaki was the author of 21 textbooks and a distinguished folklorist. She published children's works, such as the collections of children's fairy tales, Grandmother's Knees (Στης γιαγιάς τα γόνατα), Around the brazier (Γύρω στο μαγκάλ), and others. She received the First Prize of the Academy of Athens for the collection of Mantinades of Crete (Μαντινάδες Κρήτης).

In the prologue of Mantinades of Crete Lioudaki refers to those who helped her in the work of collecting mantinadas in various ways. She makes a special reference to Napoleon Soukatzidis about whom she writes: "I especially thank the most noble and progressive child Napoleon Soukatzidis, who worked tirelessly in the collection of mantinades. Most of these are among the thousands he found… ”

In April 1937 she became the assistant sorter under George Megas in the Folklore Archive of the Academy of Athens due to her exceptional folklore work.

The author Manolis Milt. Papadakis in his book "Maria Lioudaki. The Priestess of Education" writes with what enthusiasm the martyr teacher Lioudaki recorded throughout her life thousands of Mantinadas, fairy tales, obituaries, opinions, tongue twisters and all the customs of the Cretan people. Hundreds of fairy tales and other works of Lioudaki are currently in the Folklore Archive of the Academy of Athens still unpublished.

=== Resistance ===
==== Metaxas Regime ====
In 1936, Ioannis Metaxas was appointed Prime minister of Greece by King George II. On 4 August 1936, with the support of King George II, Metaxas initiated a self-coup and established an authoritarian, nationalist and anti-communist regime, specifically outlawing the Communist Party of Greece (KKE). As such, Lioudaki's sister's fiancé Napoleon Soukatzidis was imprisoned for being a communist in April 1937. While in prison, Lioudaki wrote Soukatzidis letters, which were intercepted by the Metaxas regime. These letters were used as evidence against her and described as an offense "concerning the security of the social status." The Ministry of Education asked Lioudaki to sign a statement denouncing communism and dissolving her sister's engagement, but Lioudaki refused.

As a result of her refusal to sign the statement, Lioudaki was demoted from Principal to regular teacher at Ierapetra. The new principal at the school intervened to bring new disciplinary proceedings against Lioudaki claiming "the social regime is plotting!" Lioudaki was punished with six months suspension and a 50% cut in her salary.

==== Nazi Regime ====
During April–May 1941, Nazi Germany invaded and began occupying Greece. During this period, KKE sought to reform the party with additional subsidiary groups and an anti-axis focus. In 1941, Lioudaki joined the Communist Party of Greece (KKE), becoming an important member of the militant resistance arm National Liberation Front (Greece) (EAM). She became a resistance coordinator along with Maria Drandaki and Maria Athanasaki to provide assistance to victims. Their activities included supporting orphans and homeless individuals resulting from the Viannos massacres, a mass extermination campaign launched by German forces against the civilian residents of around 20 villages near Crete, killing more than 500 people. In Drandaki's home and shop, Lioudaki would listen to illegal radio broadcasts from Allied forces (World War II) and prepare daily news bulletins which were distributed widely with other members of KKE. As a result of her resistance efforts, she was expelled from the Folklore Archives.

== Death ==
=== Dekemvriana and Treaty of Varkiza ===
After four years of Italian occupation followed by German occupation, Ierapetra was liberated on 12 September 1944. EAM made efforts to rebuild the city and support efforts to feed inhabitants in the city. Lioudaki played a leading role in supporting food and culture. Tensions rose between the Communist Forces and the Greek government, culminating in Dekemvriana, a series of clashes fought during World War II in Athens from 3 December 1944 to 11 January 1945. As a solution to these clashes, the Treaty of Varkiza was signed on 12 February 1945. According to the treaty, EAM had agreed to disarm as long as they would be allowed full participation in political activities. Ultimately, the promises enshrined in the Treaty of Varkiza were not upheld. The main problem was that the treaty gave amnesty only for political reasons, but many actions by communists during the Dekemvriana were viewed as nonpolitical. After the signing of the Varkiza pact, there was widespread persecution of communists and former EAM members and supporters. This period, immediately prior to the outbreak of the Greek Civil War, was known as the White Terror (Greece) (1945–46). The country became polarized, eventually leading to the outbreak of the Greek Civil War in March 1946, which lasted until 1949. The Communist Party of Greece remained legal during the Greek Civil War until 27 December 1947.

=== Death ===
In May 1947, Lioudaki was arrested, together with Drandaki by the armed group of Bandouvas on 26 November 1947. Bandouvas and his team gathered a large number of citizens in the courtroom of Ierapetra and asked them to renounce communism. Those who did not do so were arrested. Among the detainees were Lioudaki and Drandaki. The two women were first taken to the Badouva stables and then to the Heraklion gendarmerie, where they were tortured, raped, and hanged on 4 December 1947. Drandaki was executed with a spear, and Lioudaki was strangled. Then Drandaki and Lioudaki were beheaded and their bodies crushed with stones and then thrown into a ravine in Myrtia, Heraklion. Six months later, the bodies of the two women were identified on the roof of the Prefecture of Heraklion. They were found by a farmer near the stables of Baduwa and identified by the braids in their clothing.

Maria's sister, Chara Lioudaki, survived and died in 2000.

== Legacy ==
A street in Ierapetra is named after Lioudaki and Drandaki.

In the square of Latsida Mirabello, a village near Neapoli, Lassithi, there is a sculpture monument in memory of Lioudaki.

The Library of the Educational Home of Ierapetra was named after Lioudaki, as well as the Association of Primary Education Teachers.
