= 1 May 1944 Kaisariani executions =

Nazi war crime

The 200 of Kaisariani (1 May 1944)
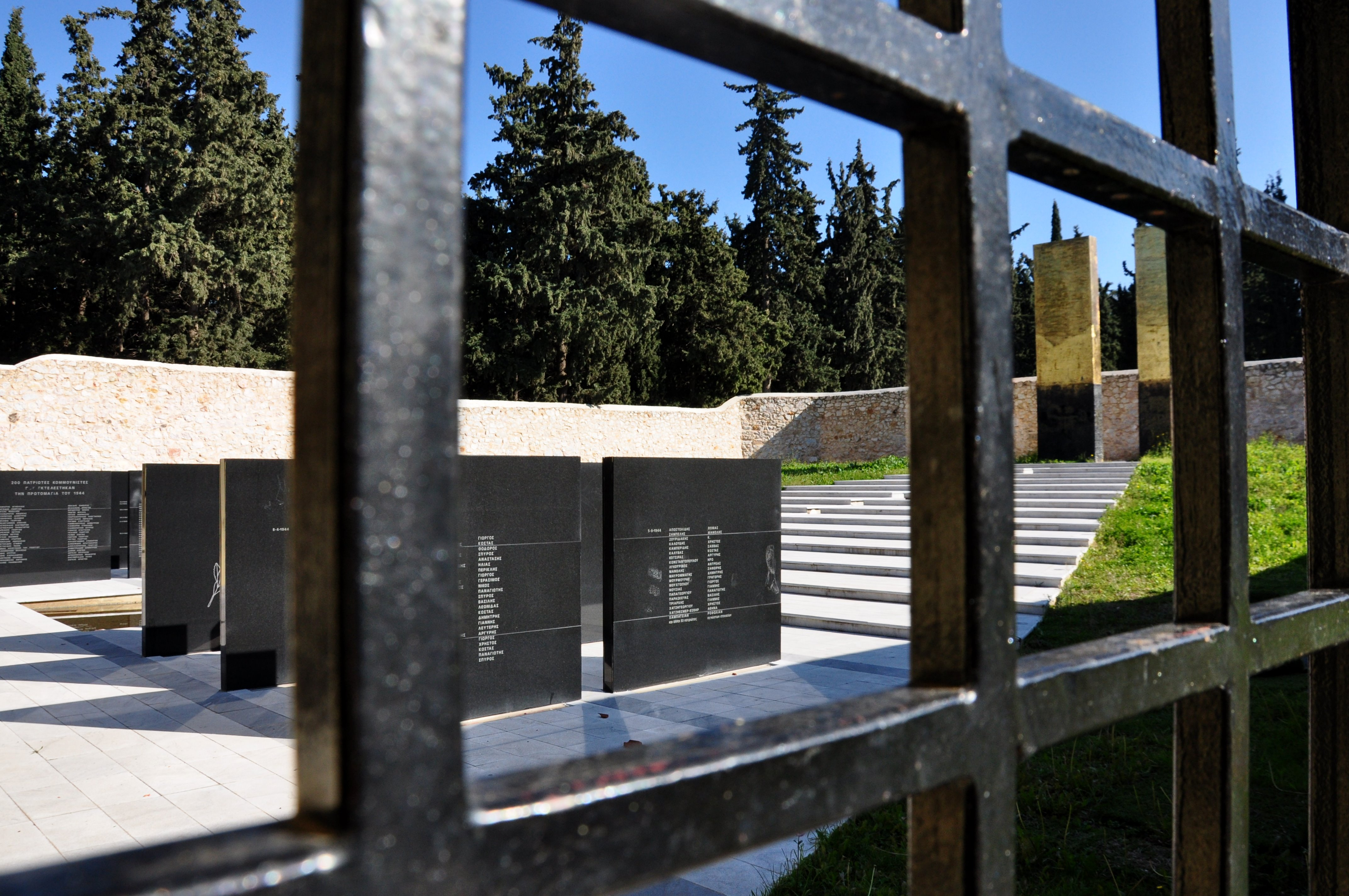
- Memorial at the Kaisariani shooting range
- Date: May 1, 1944
- Type: Executions
- Motive: Reprisal for the killing of Major General Franz Krech by Greek Resistance forces, Anti-communism
- Participants: Nazi occupation authorities
- Deaths: 200
- Burial: 3rd Athens Cemetery

On 1 May 1944, 200 Greek communists (Greek: Οι 200 της Καισαριανής, The 200 of Kaisariani), known as the 200 of Kaisariani, were executed at the firing range of the Athens suburb of Kaisariani by the Nazi occupation authorities as reprisal for the killing of a German general by ELAS forces in Laconia. The executions were a seminal event of the Greek Resistance against the Axis forces, and the 200 are remembered as heroes in Greece to this day.

== Background ==
Greece had been under the dictatorial and fiercely anti-communist Metaxas Regime since 4 August 1936. Members of KKE were persecuted and put in prison, chiefly in the Akronauplia and Corfu prisons, or sent to internal exile in small islands.

On 28 October 1940, Ioannis Metaxas rejected an ultimatum imposed by fascist Italy to surrender, committing Greece to the Allies and bringing the country into World War II. Metaxas died on 29 January 1941 during the Greco–Italian War.

With the German invasion of Greece and the start of the Axis Occupation of Greece in April 1941, the communist prisoners were placed under German control. Following the Italian surrender in September 1943, most of the communist prisoners, formerly held in the Italian-run Larissa concentration camp, were moved to Haidari concentration camp in the northwestern suburbs of Athens.

== Execution of the 200 communists ==
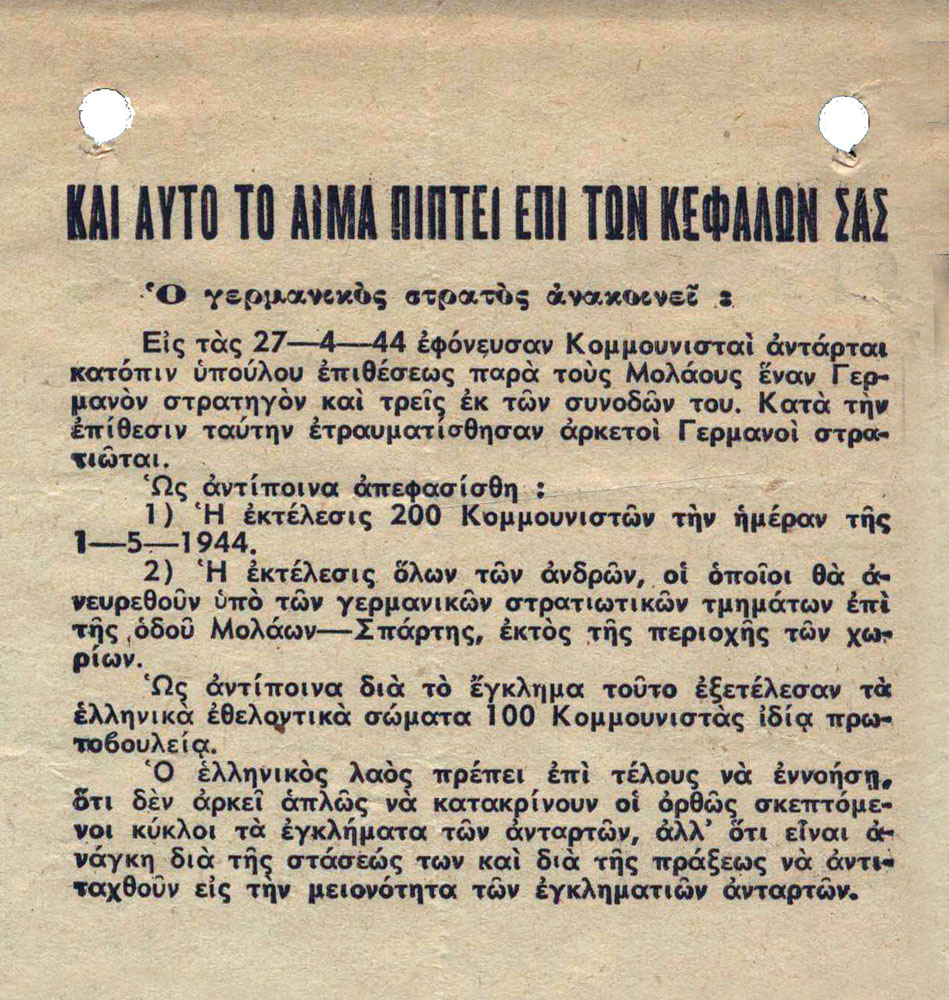
A pamphlet announcing "the execution of 200 communist prisoners in Kaisariani, on May 1, 1944 in retaliation for the killing of a German general. Greek voluntary corps executed also 100 communists on their own initiative."

On 27 April 1944, ELAS partisans ambushed and killed the German general Franz Krech and three other German officers at Molaoi in Laconia. As a retaliation, the German occupation authorities announced via proclamation the execution of 200 communists on 1 May, as well as the execution of all males found by the German troops outside their villages on the Sparti–Molaoi road. In addition, the German proclamation reported that "under the impression of this crime, Greek volunteers on their own initiative killed a further 100 communists".

On 30 April, the news of the impending executions spread in the Haidari camp. Camp commandant Fischer called the workshop foremen, all former Akronauplia inmates, and asked which of the other prisoners could replace them, ostensibly as they would be moved to a different camp the next day, along with the inmates of the Chalkis prison. Interpreting this "move" as a cover for their execution, all Akronauplia prisoners said their goodbyes to their comrades, and an impromptu farewell party was held in cell block 3 of the camp. On the next morning, the Chalkis inmates were moved from the camp on trucks. Camp commandant Fischer then held a roll call and selected the 200 prisoners to be executed—almost all the former Akronauplia inmates (ca. 170), the former exiles in Anafi and a few who were imprisoned by the Germans. According to eyewitness accounts, the prisoners reacted with defiance, singing the Greek national anthem, the Dance of Zalongo song, and the song of the Akronauplia prisoners, even as the trucks arrived to take them off.

The 200 prisoners were brought to the Kaisariani rifle range, where they were executed in batches of twenty. The corpses were buried in the 3rd Athens Cemetery. Among the executed were Napoleon Soukatzidis and Stelios Sklavainas (known for the Sophoulis-Sklavainas pact agreement before the war).

== Photographs ==
In mid February 2026, the first known photographs pertaining to the Kaisariani executions were listed on eBay; subsequently, the Greek government stated its belief that the photos were authentic, designated them as a monument, and expressed its intention to acquire them. Within hours of the existence of the photos becoming widely known, the commemorative marble plaque with the names of the victims in Kaisariani was vandalised, allegedly by far-right extremists. The auction was suspended and after negotiations, it was later announced that that the Greek State had acquired a collection of 262 photos dating from the German occupation, among which those from the executions.

The photos, some marked "Aten 1.5.44", are believed to have been taken by Hermann Heuer, a Wehrmacht lieutenant who was a Reich Ministry of Public Enlightenment and Propaganda photographer.

== Commemoration ==
=== Film adaptation ===
In October 2017, the movie To Teleftaio Simeioma ("The Last Note") by the acclaimed Greek director Pantelis Voulgaris, was released. It focuses on the story of the 200, with the German camp commandant, SS captain Karl Fischer (André Hennicke) and the Greek political prisoner and interpreter Napoleon Soukatzidis (Andreas Konstantinou) as the main characters.

=== Memorial events ===
Already during the occupation period, there were movements to honor the memory of those executed. On May 17, 1944, a unit of 100 ELAS adartes laid a wreath at the site of the execution. When on 1 May 1950 the celebration of the International Workers' Day was permitted for the first time since 1936 (the Metaxas Regime abolished it soon after), it was held at the Kaisariani shooting range. The crowd demanded amnesty for political offenses and the release of the over 20,000 political prisoners still held on the island Makronisos and elsewhere following the Greek Civil War.

Every year, the political parties of the Greek Left organize events in their memory, while the Municipality of Kaisariani organizes the SOUKATZIDEIA road races.

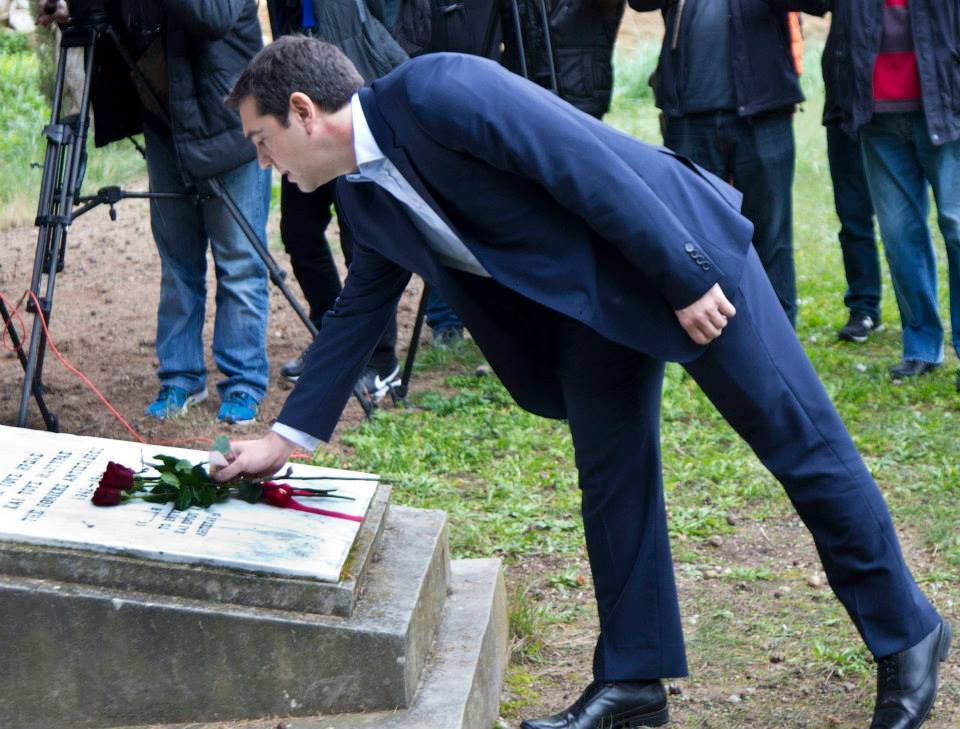
Alexis Tsipras laying down red roses at the Kaisariani Memorial.

On 26 January 2015, the newly elected leftist Prime Minister of Greece, Alexis Tsipras, visited the shooting range and laid roses on the memorial to the executions, as his first act after being sworn in. The move was widely interpreted as a symbolic gesture of defiance towards Germany and its role in the Greek government-debt crisis.

On his June 1987 visit to Greece, German President Richard von Weizsäcker chose the Kaisariani Memorial to commemorate the victims of World War II occupation in a move regarded with skepticism by conservative circles of both the Greek and German administrations. While there, Weizsäcker also mentioned the names of some other places in Greece where the German Wehrmacht had perpetrated massacres: Kalavryta, Distomo, Kleisoura, Kommeno, Lyngiades, and Kandanos.

On the occasion of the 80th anniversary of the execution of the 200 fighters, a major event-concert was organized on April 6, 2024, at Kaisariani by KKE, with the participation of Maria Farantouri and Fotini Velesiotou. The event was also attended by Magda Fyssa, mother of the murdered Pavlos Fyssas, to whom Maria Farantouri dedicated the emblematic song To gelasto paidi.

A large concert at the Kaisariani Shooting Range, with the shocking photographic documents as a backdrop, was organized on April 25, 2026 by KKE, under the artistic direction of Giorgos Dalaras, with a selection of songs by great composers, poets and lyricists. The songs were performed by Fotini Velesiotou, Yiannis Dionysiou, Pantelis Thalassinos, Violeta Ikari, Vangelis Korakakis, Natassa Bofiliou, Giota Nega, Giorgos Dalaras, Miltos Paschalidis, Aspasia Stratigou, Kostas Triantafyllidis, " Common Mortals ".

== See also ==
- EAM (Greece)
- Battle of Kokkinia
- Executions of Kokkinia
- Kalavryta massacre
- Distomo massacre
