= Napoleon Soukatzidis =

Greek communist and trade unionist

- Napoleon Soukatzidis during his army service
- Born: 1909; Bursa, Ottoman Empire (modern Turkey)
- Died: May 1, 1944 (aged 34–35); Kaisariani, Athens, Greece
- Political party: Communist Party of Greece

Napoleon Soukatzidis (Greek: Ναπολέων Σουκατζίδης; 1909 – May 1, 1944) was a Greek communist, trade unionist and one of the 200 prisoners executed at the firing range of the Athens suburb of Kaisariani by the Nazi occupation forces on May 1, 1944.

== Biography ==
Napoleon Soukatzidis was born in Bursa, Ottoman Empire (modern Turkey) in 1909 to an ethnic Greek family. After the Greek defeat in the Greco-Turkish War of 1919–1922, and the forced population exchange that followed, he and his family settled in Crete, in the area of Arkalochori, near Heraklion. He studied business and became an accountant. Soukatzidis was multilingual and spoke Russian, English, German, French as well as Turkish. He was a member of the Greek Communist Party (KKE), and president of the Heraklion shop clerks trade union. Due to his union activism, in 1936 he was arrested by the dictatorial regime of Ioannis Metaxas and exiled to the island of Agios Efstratios (Ai Stratis).

== Exile and imprisonment ==
In April 1937, Soukatzidis was transferred from Agios Efstratios to the prison of Acronauplia. Following the surrender of Greece to the Axis in April 1941, he and hundreds other political prisoners were handed over to the German forces. He was later moved to the prisons of Trikala and Larissa and eventually ended up at the Haidari transit camp in Athens. There, due to his knowledge of German, he was made an interpreter.

== Execution ==
On 27 April 1944, the German lieutenant general Franz Krech, commander of the 41st Fortress Division, was killed in an ambush by partisans of the pro-communist ELAS near Molaoi. In reprisal, on 30 April the German authorities ordered the execution of two hundreds of political prisoners kept at Haidari. The dead row list was drafted at the Gestapo headquarters in Merlin Street. Soukatzidis was calling out the names of those to be shot when he read his own name from the list. The German camp commandant lieutenant Karl Fischer told him to remain at his position. Soukatzidis then asked Fischer whether his place would remain vacant. Fischer replied that his orders were to have two hundreds shot, so Soukatzidis left his post and joined those condemned to die. He and his comrades were driven on lorries to the shooting range of Kaisariani and executed in batches of 20 by firing squad on the dawn of 1 May 1944.

== Legacy ==
A statue of Soukatzidis stands in Archalochori and a street in the suburb of Haidari bears his name.

The 2017 film The Last Note by Pantelis Voulgaris portrays Soukatzidis' sacrifice. He is played by the Greek actor Andreas Konstantinou.
