= Behind the Haystacks =

2022 Greek drama film

- Theatrical release poster
- Greek: Πίσω από τις θημωνιές
- Directed by: Asimina Proedrou
- Written by: Asimina Proedrou
- Produced by: Vladimir Anastasov; Ioanna Bolomyti; Markus Halberschmidt; Angela Nestorovska
- Starring: Stathis Stamoulakatos; Eleni Ouzounidou; Evgenia Lavda; Christos Kontogeorgis
- Cinematography: Simos Sarketzis
- Edited by: Ilektra Venaki
- Music by: Marios Strofalis
- Production companies: Argonauts Productions; Fiction Park; Sektor Film
- Release dates: 11 November 2022 (TIFF); 24 January 2023 (Greece)
- Running time: 118 minutes
- Countries: Greece; Germany; North Macedonia
- Language: Greek

Behind the Haystacks (Greek: Πίσω από τις θημωνιές, romanized: Píso apo tis thimonies) is a 2022 drama film written and directed by Asimina Proedrou in her directorial debut. The film tells the story of a middle-aged fisherman who, faced with mounting debt, begins to smuggle refugees across a lake on Greece's northern border. It had its premiere at the 63rd Thessaloniki International Film Festival in 'Meet the Neighbours Competition' section on 11 November 2022.

Behind the Haystacks was nominated in 17 categories in the 14th edition of the Hellenic Film Academy Awards, and won the Best Film Award along with nine other accolades. It was selected as the Greek entry for the Best International Feature Film at the 96th Academy Awards. On December 7, it appeared in the eligible list for consideration for the 2024 Oscars, but it didn't make it to the shortlist.

== Synopsis ==
In 2015, a middle-aged fisherman living on the border of Greece with North Macedonia near Doiran Lake finds himself in deep debt. He begins trafficking immigrants* across the border, in exchange for a large sum. His wife, a housewife and devout parishioner, seeks truth, while her daughter attempts to define her own life in an oppressive environment. Then a tragic incident hits the family, pushing the three heroes to confront their own impasses and personal weaknesses, while having to consider, for the first time in their lives, the price to pay for their actions.

*During this period several European countries had closed their borders, resulting in hundreds of refugees and immigrants being trapped near the northern borders of Greece.

== Cast ==
- Stathis Stamoulakatos as Stergios
- Eleni Ouzounidou as Maria
- Evgenia Lavda as Anastasia
- Christos Kontogeorgis as Christos
- Dina Mihailidou as Georgia
- Paschalis Tsarouhas as Dimitris
- Leonidas Alatsakis as Nikos

== Release ==
The film had its premiere at the 63rd Thessaloniki International Film Festival in 'Meet the Neighbours Competition' section on 11 November 2022. It competed in 53rd International Film Festival of India in November 2022 and won IFFI Best Debut Director Award for Asimina Proedrou.

It was selected in the Sydney Film Festival for its Australian premiere on 10 June 2023. It had its Irish premiere at Galway Film Fleadh on 12 July 2023. It was also screened at the Oldenburg Film Festival on 15 September 2023.

== Reception ==
Amber Wilkinson of ScreenDaily reviewing the film at Thessaloniki International Film Festival wrote, "Proedrou's approach may be lyrical but it's also economical." Nadine Whitney, writing for The Curb wrote, "Behind the Haystacks is both poetic and caustic." Whitney added that "Proedrou, subtly damning Greek society for ignoring human suffering, isn't offering answers—she is showing how easy it is for people to avoid taking responsibility."

== Accolades ==
Behind the Haystacks was shortlisted for the European Film awards in the 36th European Film Awards, but it was not nominated in the nominations announced on 7 November. The awards ceremony will take place on 9 December in Berlin.

The film set a record at Hellenic Film Academy Awards by getting 17 nominations and winning the prizes for best film, best director, debut director, best screenplay, best lead actor, best supporting actress and actor, best cinematography, best editing and best sound.

The film is also selected as Greece entry for nominations in 38th edition of Goya Award for Best European Film competing with other nine selections from 9 European countries. The 38th Goya Awards will take place on 10 February 2024 at Valladolid, Spain.

Award	Date	Category	Recipient	Result	Ref.
Thessaloniki International Film Festival	14 November 2022	Special Mention	Behind the Haystacks	Won	
Thessaloniki International Film Festival	14 November 2022	FIPRESCI awards: Greek Association of Film Critics' Award	Behind the Haystacks	Won	
Thessaloniki International Film Festival	14 November 2022	Greek Film Centre Award (ex aequo)	Behind the Haystacks	Won	
Thessaloniki International Film Festival	14 November 2022	Hellenic Film Commission Best Location Award	Giorgos Babanaras	Won	
International Film Festival of India	28 November 2022	IFFI Best Debut Director Award	Asimina Proedrou	Won	
Hellenic Film Academy Awards	29 June 2023	Best Film	Behind the Haystacks	Won	
Hellenic Film Academy Awards	29 June 2023	Best Director	Asimina Proedrou	Won	
Hellenic Film Academy Awards	29 June 2023	Best First-time Director	Asimina Proedrou	Won	
Hellenic Film Academy Awards	29 June 2023	Best Screenplay	Asimina Proedrou	Won	
Hellenic Film Academy Awards	29 June 2023	Best Actor in a Leading Role	Stathis Stamoulakatos	Won	
Hellenic Film Academy Awards	29 June 2023	Best Actor in a Supporting Role	Christos Kontogeorgis	Won	
Hellenic Film Academy Awards	29 June 2023	Best Actress in a Supporting Role	Dina Mihailidou	Won	
Hellenic Film Academy Awards	29 June 2023	Best Cinematography	Simos Sarketzis	Won	
Hellenic Film Academy Awards	29 June 2023	Best Editing	Ilektra Venaki	Won	
Hellenic Film Academy Awards	29 June 2023	Best Sound	Nikos Papadimitriou, Ilektra Venaki, Persefoni Miliou, Kostas Varympopiotis	Won	
Hellenic Film Academy Awards	29 June 2023	Best Actress	Eleni Ouzounidou	Nominated	
Hellenic Film Academy Awards	29 June 2023	Best Costume Design	Kiki Miliou	Nominated	
Hellenic Film Academy Awards	29 June 2023	Best Film Score	Marios Strofalis	Nominated	
Hellenic Film Academy Awards	29 June 2023	Best Make-up Design, Hair and Special Effects	Dora Nazou	Nominated	
Hellenic Film Academy Awards	29 June 2023	Best Production Design	Edouard Georgiou	Nominated	
Hellenic Film Academy Awards	29 June 2023	Special Effects and Visual Effects Award	Antonis Kotzias	Nominated	

== See also ==
- List of submissions to the 96th Academy Awards for Best International Feature Film
- List of Greek submissions for the Academy Award for Best International Feature Film
