= Manousos Manousakis =

Greek director, producer and writer (1950–2024)

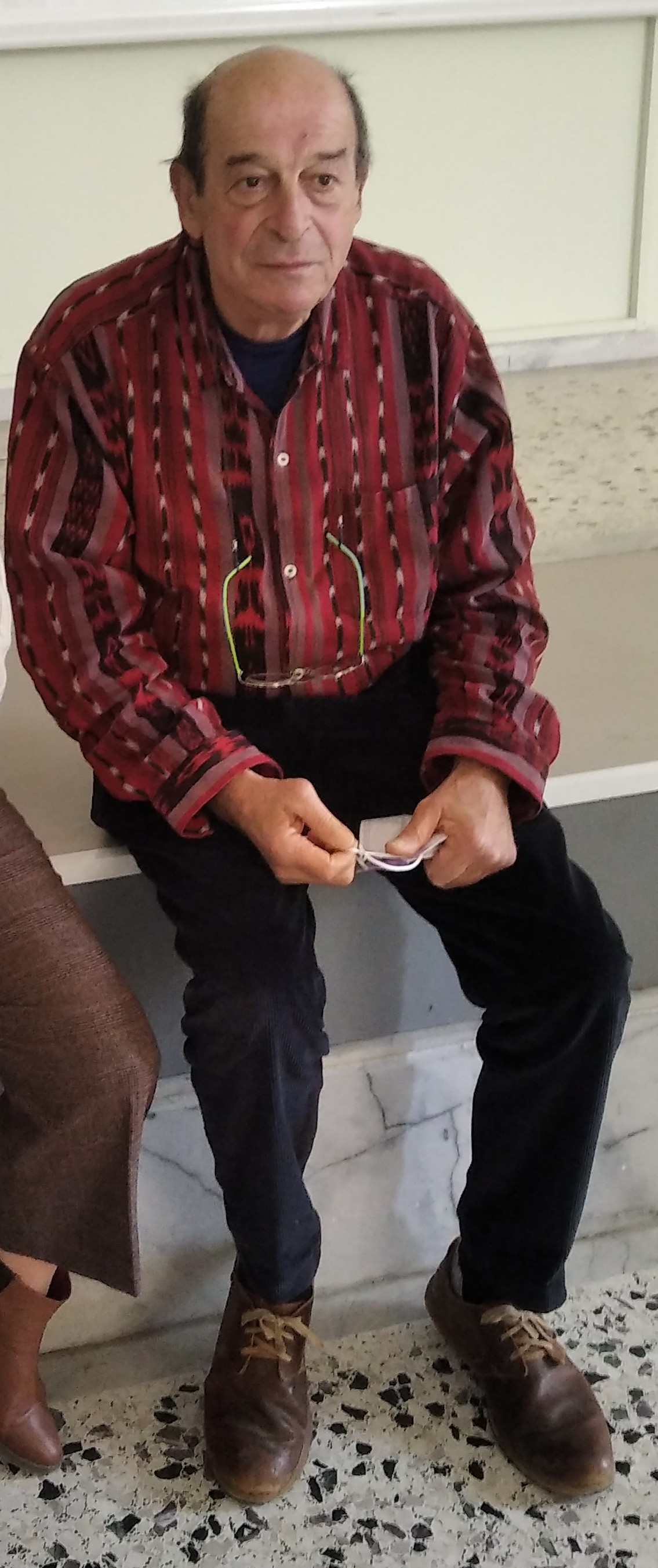
- Born: 14 January 1950; Athens, Greece
- Died: 20 November 2024 (aged 74); Athens, Greece
- Occupation(s): Director, producer, writer
- Spouse: Maria Manousaki (m. 1975)
- Children: 2

Manousos Manousakis (Greek: Μανούσος Μανουσάκης; 14 January 1950 – 20 November 2024) was a Greek director, producer and writer. His paternal family is from Avdou Heraklion, Crete. He studied at the London Film School. He was married to Maria, and together they had two children. He was a nephew of Irene Papas and first cousin of Aias Manthopoulos.

Manousos Manousakis died in Athens on 20 November 2024, at the age of 74.

== Filmography ==
=== Director ===
- 1973: Vartholomaios
- 1977: Arhontes
- 1978: Oi tembelides tis eforis koiladas (second unit director/assistant director)
- 1985: I skiahtra
- 1986: Paraxeni synadisi
- 1987: Mikrografies
- 1987: Antistrofi poreia
- 1990: Nyhta Magon
- 1991: Fakelos Amazon
- 1992: Tmima ithon
- 1994: Tavros me toxoti
- 1995: Oi dromoi tis polis
- 1996: Paliroia
- 1997: Psythiroi kardias
- 1998: Agigma psyhis
- 1998: Kokkinos drakos
- 1999: Synora agapis
- 2000: Athoos i enohos
- 2000: Erotas kleftis
- 2001: Gia mia gynaika ki ena aftokinito
- 2002: I agapi irthe apo makria
- 2003: To paihnidi tis sygnomis
- 2004: Mi mou les adio
- 2005: Kryfa monopatia
- 2006: Gia tin Anna
- 2007: Faros
- 2015: Cloudy Sunday

=== Producer ===
- 1973: Vartholomaios
- 1977: Arhontes
- 1985: I skiahtra
- 2000: Athoos i enohos

=== Writer ===
- 1973: Vartholomaios
- 1990: Nyhta Magon
- 1985: I skiahtra
- 1998: Kokkinos drakos

=== Actor ===
- 1981: Souvliste tous! Etsi tha paroume to kouradokastro
- 1983: Homecoming Song (Το τραγούδι της επιστροφής)
- 1984: Loafing and Camouflage (Λούφα και παραλλαγή)
- 1992: Tmima ithon
