= Yannis Stankoglou =

Greek film and theater actor

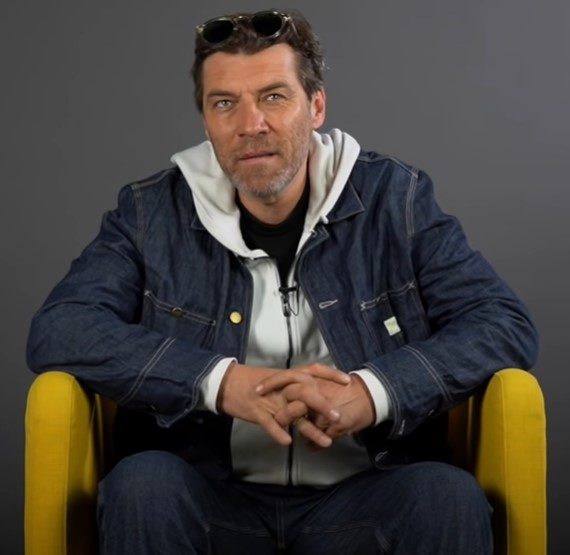
- Greek actor Giannis Stankoglou, in June 2021.
- Born: January 10 1974 (age 52); Athens, Greece
- Occupations: Film and theatre actor

Yannis (or Yiannis) Stankoglou (Greek: Γιάννης Στάνκογλου; born 10 January 1974) is a Greek actor.

== Biography ==
Yannis Stankoglou was born in Athens, and worked as a builder and construction worker in his teens, before discovering theatre. He attended the Athens Drama School and went on to study and work in New York. Stankoglou later returned to Greece where he would spend the next two decades working as a television, film and theatre actor. Stankoglou works in Greece, Europe and the United States. He has toured internationally with productions of Greek tragedy and modern works, representing Greek theatre in China, Latin America, and Russia.

In October 2025, Stankoglou featured in productions of Annie and Lola.

== Theatre ==
- 2011: The Third Wedding (adaptation of the novel by Costas Taktsis)
- 2012: Rainman (theatre version of the film)
- 2012: Iphigenia in Aulis (Euripides)
- 2013: Theseus and Ariadne (adaptation by Stratis Paschalis)
- 2013: I am somebody else (based on the life of Arthur Rimbaud)
- 2015: Jason and the Golden Fleece
- 2016: Victor/Victoria
- 2018: Junkermann (adaptation of the novel by Karagatsis)

== Filmography ==
=== Film ===
| Year | Title | Role | Notes |
|---|---|---|---|
| 2001 | Bar | | film debut |
| 2003 | Black Amour | Panagiotis | short film |
| 2004 | Hardcore | Zoes | |
| 2004 | Alithini Zoi | Giorgos | |
| 2005 | To oneiro tou skylou | | |
| 2005 | Omiros | Grigoris | |
| 2005 | Ki an fygo... tha xanartho | Markos | |
| 2006 | 2004, One Year Later | man | short film |
| 2006 | Kinisi omali | Nikos | short film |
| 2006 | Without | promotion supervisor | short film |
| 2006 | Pandora | Manos | |
| 2007 | To spiti me tis elies | | short film |
| 2008 | Flat | | short film |
| 2008 | When fish fly | | short film |
| 2008 | Ta poupoula tou Donald | | short film |
| 2009 | Vasilis Karagiorgos | | short film |
| 2009 | Euphoria | | short film |
| 2010 | Oedipus | son / detective | short film |
| 2010 | Stiff - a little love story | | Short film |
| 2011 | Christmas Tango | Lt. Stefanos Karamanidis | |
| 2011 | Mavri Thyella | | short film |
| 2012 | Desma aimatos | | |
| 2012 | Apostaseis | | short film |
| 2013 | Wild Duck | Manos | |
| 2013 | The Case of Mary Ford | Giorgos | short film |
| 2013 | To deipno | man | short film |
| 2013 | Illusion | | |
| 2014 | Me horis gynaikes | | |
| 2014 | Xenia | Lefteris | |
| 2014 | Lomasankarit | Andriana's father | |
| 2014 | Forget me not | Alex | |
| 2015 | Semeli | Aris | short film |
| 2015 | The Republic | Efthymiadis | |
| 2015 | Invisible | Aris | |
| 2015 | Blind Sun | Le policier | |
| 2015 | Ouzeri Tsitsanis | Jaco Beza | |
| 2015 | I kori tou Rembrandt | | |
| 2016 | Amerika Square | Billy | |
| 2017 | Aria | | short film |
| 2017 | I zoi meta | Michalis | |
| 2017 | Mandelion | Pyrros | short film |
| 2018 | Chinatown: The Three Shelters | | |
| 2018 | O thanatopoinitis | | short film |
| 2018 | The Waiter | The Blond | |
| 2019 | Fantasia | Nikos Kokkinos | |
| 2021 | Man of God | Spiros | |
| 2022 | The Last Journey | captain | short film |
| 2026 | What Soul Will You Deliver, You Fool Woman?: Part 1 | Joe Widmark | |

=== Television ===
| Year | Title | Role(s) | Notes |
|---|---|---|---|
| 2003 | Kleise ta matia | Argyris | 1 episode |
| 2004 | 10th commandment | Socrates | Episode: "Aggelika prosopa" |
| 2004 | 10th commandment | waiter | Episode: "Se vathia nera" |
| 2004 | 10th commandment | Vangelis | Episode: "Kleistes portes" |
| 2005 | 10th commandment | Nikos | Episode: "Enoho mystiko" |
| 2005 | 10th commandment | Argyris | Episode: "Mesotoihia" |
| 2005 | 10th commandment | Petros | Episode: "Oikogeneiaki giorti" |
| 2006 | 10th commandment | Marios | Episode: "Ofthalmon anti ofthalmou" |
| 2006 | 10th commandment | Ages | Episode: "Kataramenoi" |
| 2006 | 10th commandment | Fotis | Episode: "Emmoni" |
| 2007 | Pano apo to nomo | Mihalis Lazarou | Lead role (9 episodes) |
| 2007 | Oi istories tou astynomou Beka | Yannis Aggelides | Episode: "O dolofonos forouse smokin" |
| 2007 | 10th commandment | thif #1 | Episode: "Enas isihos anthropos" |
| 2007 | 10th commandment | Kostas Palmas | Episode: "The end" |
| 2007 | Istories apo tin apenanti ohthi | | Episode: "Idioktitis" |
| 2007-2008 | One month or something | Thodoros | Lead role, 25 episodes |
| 2008 | True Loves | Haris | Episode: "Invisible people" |
| 2008 | True Loves | Thanasis | Episode: "Small things" |
| 2008-2009 | Who's catching us! | Konstantinos | Lead role, 16 episodes |
| 2010 | Star War | Dimitris Samiotakis | Episode: "Ego and me" |
| 2010 | The Third Law | Nikos | Episode: "The smell of the beast" |
| 2010-2011 | The Island | Andreas Vandoulakis | Lead role, 19 episodes |
| 2012 | Clinical Case | Nikitas Freris | 4 episodes |
| 2015 | 10th commandment | man in the elevator | Episode: "Beast" |
| 2015 | 10th commandment | Haris | Episode: "Three" |
| 2015 | 10th commandment | dealer | Episode: "Face" |
| 2019-2020 | Wild Bees | Thomas Kypraios | Lead role, Season 1 - 125 episodes, Recurring role, Season 2 - 22 episodes |
| 2021 | Almost Adults | Apostolis Karkantzos | Lead role, 12 episodes |
| 2022 | The Oath | Angelos Raptis | Lead role, Season 1 - 36 episodes |
| 2022 | Saint Paisios: From Farasa to Heaven | shepherd Thodoros | 1 episode |
| 2022 | One August Night | Andreas Vandoulakis | Lead role, 14 episodes |
| 2022-2023 | Edge of Night | Christos Anagnostou | Lead role, 110 episodes |
| 2023 | The Numbers | Himself | Episode: "The circle" |
| 2023-2024 | The shipwreck | Ippokratis Panopoulos | Lead role, 116 episodes |
| 2024-2025 | Archelaou 5th street | Matthew vasileiou | Lead role, 80 episodes |
| 2025 | The Ghosts | Himself | 1 episode |
| 2025-2026 | Grand Hotel | Gerasimos Hatzimitros | Main role, 150 episodes |
