= The Enemy Within (2013 film) =

2013 Greek film

- Directed by: Yorgos Tsemberopoulos
- Written by: Yorgos Tsemberopoulos
- Starring: Manolis Mavromatakis; Maria Zorba
- Cinematography: Vangelis Katritzidakis
- Edited by: Yorgos Mavropsaridis
- Music by: Akis Daoutis
- Release date: September 28, 2013 (Athens)
- Running time: 107 minutes
- Country: Greece
- Language: Greek

The Enemy Within (Greek: Ο Εχθρός μου) is a Greek film, directed by Yorgos Tsemberopoulos. The film released in 2013 and it stars Manolis Mavromatakis and Maria Zorba. Tsemberopoulos has described the film as a social drama that "deals with whether morally conscious people can stick to their principles in the very difficult times we live in."

The film premiered at the 2013 Athens International Film Festival. It won three awards in Hellenic Film Academy Awards in categories Best Director, Best Screenplay and Best Editing.

== Plot ==
A progressive and open-minded man, owner of a flower shop, lives in Athens with his family, his wife and two teenage children. His serene and ordinary life turns over when some burglars, invade in his house and rape his daughter. After this event, his perception and his ideas change. He feels unsafe, fear but mostly rage. His anger drives him to find the burglars in order to exact revenge. But this act destroys the family calmness and he starts to live under the fear.

== Cast ==
- Manolis Mavromatakis
- Maria Zorba
- Yiorgos Gallos
- Antonis Karistinos
- Thanasis Papageorgiou

== Awards ==
List of awards and nominations
Award	Category	Recipients and nominees	Result
2014 Hellenic Film Academy Awards	Best Director	Yorgos Tsemberopoulos	Won
2014 Hellenic Film Academy Awards	Best Screenplay	Yorgos Tsemberopoulos	Won
2014 Hellenic Film Academy Awards	Best Editing	Yorgos Mavropsaridis	Won
