= Cloudy Sunday =

1943 or 1944 song composed and originally performed by Vassilis Tsitsanis

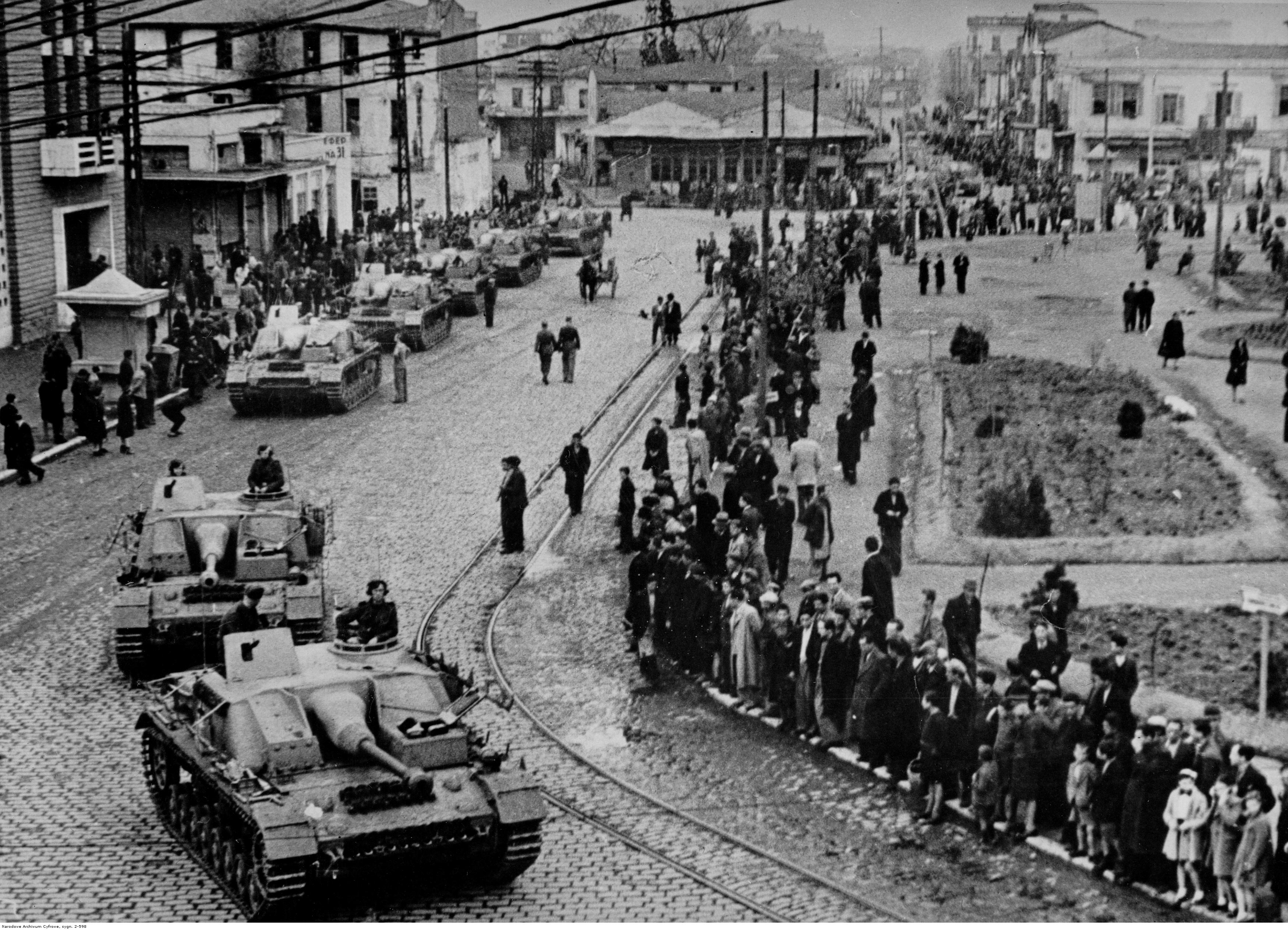
German tanks in Thessaloniki in April 1944. Tsitsanis considered that "Cloudy Sunday" responded to the experience of German occupation.

"Cloudy Sunday" (Greek: Συννεφιασμένη Κυριακή, romanized: Synefiazmeni Kyriaki) is a 1943 or 1944 song composed and originally performed by the Greek songwriter Vassilis Tsitsanis (1915–84). It is one of the most celebrated compositions in the popular genre of Rebetiko. It has been described as "a sort of unofficial national anthem".

== Content ==
"Cloudy Sunday" is a love song with a strongly melancholy tone. The lyrics emphasize the protagonist's emotion while giving little or no factual detail. A.A. Fatouros notes that no name is provided for the female character and that it contains no obvious social or political context. However, he argues that "[f]or those who have heard it, for those who have danced to its music or sang it, when happy, sad, drunk or nostalgic, the feeling it expresses has a life of its own, an existence independent of any precise cause". Its first verses read, in Fatouros's translation:

Συννεφιασμένη Κυριακή,
μοιάζεις με την καρδιά μου
που έχει πάντα συννεφιά,
Χριστέ και Παναγιά μου.

Είσαι μια μέρα σαν κι αυτή,
που 'χασα την χαρά μου.
συννεφιασμένη Κυριακή,
ματώνεις την καρδιά μου.

Translation:

"Cloudy Sunday
You are like my heart
It's always clouded over
Oh! Jesus Christ and Virgin!

You're a day like that
On which I lost my joy
Cloudy Sunday
You make my heart bleed."

Tsitsanis composed the song at Thessaloniki (Salonica) in German-occupied Northern Greece. At the time, he regularly performed to small audiences in a bar he owned as the German occupation authorities considered Rebetiko essentially degenerate and limited its outlets. It is thought to have been composed in 1943 or 1944 in the aftermath of the Great Famine (1941–42). Tsitsanis later wrote that "I wrote the Synnefiasmeni Kyriaki ('Cloudy Sunday') based on the tragic incidents that happened then in our country: starvation, misery, fear, depression, arrests, executions. The lyrics I wrote were inspired by this climate. The melody came out of the 'cloudy' occupation, out of the frustration we all suffered - then, when everything was shadowed under terror and was crushed by slavery."

Tsitsanis made several recordings of "Cloudy Sunday" from 1948. In spite of its limited audience during the occupation period itself, it is strongly associated with it in Greek popular culture.
