= The Waiter (2018 film) =

- Directed by: Steve Krikris
- Starring: Aris Servetalis
- Release date: 5 November 2018 (TIFF)
- Running time: 1h 44min
- Country: Greece
- Language: Greek

The Waiter is a 2018 Greek drama film directed by Steve Krikris.

== Plot ==
Renos (Aris Servetalis) is a lonely waiter whose life is turned upside down by some unexpected events.

== Cast ==
- Aris Servetalis as Renos
- Yannis Stankoglou as The Blond
- Alexandros Mavropoulos as Thunder
- Chiara Gensini as Tzina
