= Christos Loulis =

Greek actor (born 1976)

Chris Loulis (Greek: Χρήστος Λούλης) (born April 10, 1976) is a Greek film, television and stage actor. He took part at the 2004 Summer Olympics opening ceremony. Loulis was awarded in 2003 with the award for best newcomer male actor Dimitris Horn Award for his role in the play of Erotokritos.

== Filmography ==
Year	Title	Other notes
2005	Honey and the Pig	as Manos
2008	Slaves in Their Bonds	Won-Greek Competition Award for Best Supporting Actor at Thessaloniki Film Festival
2011	J.A.C.E	as Father
2011	Paradeisos	as Sokratis
2013	Miss Violence	
2017	Love me Not	as Alexandros Avranas
2019	Adults in the Room	as Yanis Varoufakis
2021	Silent Road (Σιωπηλός δρόμος)	as Vasilis Totsis né Iasonas Tsimakis
