= Christmas Tango =

2011 film

- Film poster
- Directed by: Nikos Koutelidakis
- Based on: Christmas Tango by Yannis Xanthoulis
- Produced by: Yannis Exintaris
- Starring: Yannis Bezos
- Cinematography: Yannis Drakoularakos
- Release date: 1 December 2011
- Running time: 102 minutes
- Country: Greece
- Language: Greek
- Box office: $1,927,222

Christmas Tango (Greek: Το Τανγκό των Χριστουγέννων, translit. To tango ton Christougennon) is a 2011 Greek drama film directed by Nikos Koutelidakis from a screenplay by Vangelis Nassis, based on the novel of the same name by Yannis Xanthoulis. The film stars Yannis Bezos, Yannis Stankoglou, Antinoos Albanis and Vicky Papadopoulou.

The film is set during the period of the Regime of the Colonels in a camp in Evros. Stefanos Karamanidis is a lieutenant and in love with Zoe, the wife of Lieutenant Colonel Manolis Longos. He wants to ask her to dance tango at Christmas, but she does not know how to dance. In order to learn to dance tango and be ready for the holiday, he enlists the help of his soldier, Lazarus Lazarus, who is secretly in love with him.

Christmas Tango was released in theaters on December 1, 2011 and grossed $1,927,222. It received generally positive reviews, with critics praising the actors' performances, but with some criticism towards the screenplay. The film won the Costume Design, Set Design and Original Music Awards from the Hellenic Film Academy.

== Plot ==
In a pharmacy, an old man meets a young man and, seeing him, is shaken. He returns home and searches his belongings, where he finds a bust of the goddess Aphrodite.

Then, the story is transferred to the past, to a camp in Evros during the Dictatorship, where preparations begin for the reception of the Christmas holiday. The camp commander, Manolis Longos, wanting everything to be ready by then, prohibits the hoplites from taking leave. Lieutenant Stefanos Karamanidis is secretly in love with the commander's wife and is quite sad because there is a fear that he will never see her again, as the commander is expecting a transfer to Athens. At a party at the club, Karamanidis sees Zoe who, although she does not dance, admires those who dance tango.

Karamanidis, wanting to ask Zoe to dance tango with him at the camp's Christmas party, asks a soldier, Lazaros Lazarou, to teach him how to dance tango. Thus, the two of them meet secretly every night in the lieutenant's office, where Lazarou gives dance lessons to Karamanidis. Meanwhile, life in the commander's house is not pleasant for Zoe, as he treats everything with military discipline and even for a short walk for Zoe with their young daughter, he requires that he be asked for permission first.

At some point, Lazarou learns from his sister that their mother is seriously ill and slowly dying. He asks Karamanidis for permission to go down to Athens, but he refuses, saying that he will let him go if he teaches him to dance by the time of the festival. Lazarou, having no other choice and wanting to see his mother before he dies, decides to illegally leave the camp but is noticed by Karamanidis. However, Karamanidis says nothing to him and lets him go. As he walks away, Lazarou finally decides to return to the camp and goes straight to the lieutenant's office, where they continue their tango lessons. As they dance, Karamanidis, thinking that he is dancing with Zoe, leans down and kisses Lazarou, who immediately faints, since he is seriously ill with pneumonia and is taken to the hospital.

The day of the celebration arrives but Zoe, to Karamanidis' disappointment, does not show up with Longos. She finally arrives a little later and Karamanidis finds the opportunity to ask her to dance when Longos is talking to the brigadier general about his transfer to Athens. As they dance, Karamanidis tells her that he is in love with her and confesses that he had sent her the tango music album as a gift.

Returning to the present, the old man meets the young man again, who looks an awful lot like Karamanidis, and tells him that he knew his father. When he tells him that he looks amazingly like him, the young man is surprised, telling him that everyone always told him the opposite. When the young man introduces himself as Longos, the old man, who is Lazarus, realizes what has happened. Afterwards, Lazarus visits Zoe and gives her the bust of Aphrodite, while later he goes to the estate where Karamanidis lives, leaving him a tango record, without however introducing himself to him or leaving him any note about who left him the record.

== Cast ==
- Yannis Bezos as Manolis Loggos
- Antinoos Albanis as Lazaros Lazarou
- Yannis Stankoglou as Stefanos Karamanidis
- Vicky Papadopoulou as Zoi Loggou
- Eleni Kokkidou as Paraskevi
- Vassilis Risvas as Notis Voskopoulos
- Giannis Papagiannis as Anastasiou
- Foivos Kontogiannis as Balaskas
- Giorgos Papageorgiou as Doctor
- Vangelis Romnios as Bakas
- Thanos Chronis as Kallergis

== Production ==
The idea of adapting Yannis Xanthoulis' book to the big screen was initiated by Yannis Bezos in 2007, who proposed it to him during a meeting with director Nikos Koutelidakis, and the two discussed the possibilities of a film adaptation. Koutelidakis, referring to the casting, said that he chose the specific actors for the specific roles because each actor had some element of the role they were playing.

Filming began in January 2011 in Aliartos, where part of the shoot took place at the buildings of the Kopais Organization. In March 2011, the production moved to Karoti, where an abandoned military camp was cleaned and suitably modified to meet the needs of the shoot. Filming also took place in the village of Metaxades in the Evros region, as well as in Athens, since the weather conditions in Evros did not allow all the scenes set in the military camp to be filmed there. As a result, the interior scenes were filmed in locations in Athens and Aliartos.

== Promotion and release ==
The film's first trailer was released on May 17, 2011, while the second and official trailer was released on October 9, 2011. In mid-June 2011, a promotional poster was released, depicting two pairs of male feet dancing with each other. About a week before the film's theatrical release, Village released two television spots, each approximately 20 seconds long.

On October 10, 2011, the official press conference for Tango del Noel was held, attended by the cast, director, and composer to introduce and discuss the film.

Christmas Tango had its official premiere on 21 November 2011 at the Athens Concert Hall. For the official premiere, a special version of the film was created without the soundtrack, which was supplemented live by 44 musicians from the Sofia Symphony Orchestra, under the direction of the film's composer, Yiannos Aiolou. The film was released in cinemas on 1 December 2011. It was also released on DVD and Blu-Ray on 7 and 16 March 2012, respectively.

== Music ==
The film's soundtrack was composed by Yiannos Aiolou, as was the title song, "A Moment Forever", with lyrics by Eleni Zioga and performed by Giorgos Dalaras. The music was performed by a string ensemble from New York, Boston, and Columbus (Ohio), the English bandoneonist Julian Roland, and Greek musicians, in an ensemble that exceeded 70 musicians.

The title song was the precursor to the entire project, as well as the main theme of the film, and was released on a collector's (300 copies) small 33 rpm vinyl record. The collector's disc insert also included tango learning instructions. The entire soundtrack was released on CD, containing a total of 40 tracks, one of which is the title song, in December 2011.

Commenting on the film and its music during the official press conference, Aiolou stated: "Christmas Tango is an ensemble film. Four people, three different love relationships, that's why there are three different musical themes, which intertwine with each other".

== Reception ==
=== Box Office ===
The film grossed a total of $1,927,222 and was ranked the 15th highest-grossing film in the country for 2011. In its first and second weekends, the film topped the box office, selling 36,867 and 35,238 tickets respectively, for a total of 95,553 tickets for both weekends. In its third weekend, it fell to second place at the box office with 24,450 tickets. Christmas Tango concluded its run in its sixth week with 6,958 tickets, for a total of 203,434 tickets.

=== Reviews ===
On the review aggregator YouRate, Christmas Tango has a rating of 58/100 based on 12 reviews.

Leda Galanou from Flix rated the film 3/5, stating that its strength is its cast:

"The film's great strength, apart from the story of archetypal unrequited love, is its cast. Yannis Bezos is an imposing embodiment of power, Antinoos Albanis handles his vulnerable hero with discretion and self-sufficiency, Eleni Kokkidou stands out with ease in her small role, and Vicky Papadopoulou is so photogenic that she fulfills the task. However, the actor who holds the film and fills the screen with the sultry face of calm strength and true zen of the premier is Yiannis Stankoglou. [...] [While] the competition in the triangle Bezos – Papadopoulou – Stankoglou gradually gains intensity and takes off, the development of the Stankoglou – Albanis relationship staggers, flows with an awkward conservatism, while in essence it is also the most authentic, characteristic part of the story”.

Thodoris Koutsoyannopoulos, writing for Lifo, rated the film 2.5/5, stating:

"[...] Nikos Koutelidakis, in his directorial debut, manages to deliver the climax, with the help of the apt, albeit overproduced, music by Yannos Aiolos, and to keep the basic lines of the undeclared, due to circumstances and era, passion and desire, admittedly with more coarse lines than the occasion would allow. The atmospheric handling of the image balances the exaggerations, Papadopoulou is charming, Stankoglou is specific and Doric, Bezos is precise and cinematic, while Antinoos Albanis is directed towards a sensitivity that breaks the drama into many pieces - the confusion is mainly due to the script's inability to illuminate his homosexuality in more cinematic terms, instead of leaving it inexplicably suspended".

Rhea Vitali from Protagon gave the film a positive review, praising the performances of the four protagonists and describing the distribution of roles as "wise". She considered, however, that the scene in the pharmacy and its continuation at the end of the film were unnecessary, saying: "It almost destroyed the atmosphere of the entire work. It spat out its essence. The two minutes of the eternity of a love. The cineramatzo-poetry they did was profane. With bad makeup like a carnival". Kostas Tsokos from Filmboy rated the film 5/10, saying that although the plot hid a lot of emotion, beyond isolated moments it failed to convey it, while "the main problem" was the script and direction. He pointed out, however, that the photography and music were "excellent" and the performances "the best part", with Albanis and Stankoglou standing out in expressing the emotions of their heroes. "[Albanis] was shocking in all his reactions, the melancholy, the secret desires, the hesitation in front of his superiors, the anguish and despair for the sick mother. Stankoglou also seemed born for the role, with his wild features and mustache, and he also exuded real emotion, anger, loneliness and sadness at the same time".

== Accolades ==
Christmas Tango received a total of five nominations at the Hellenic Film Academy Awards, of which it won in three categories; costume design, cinematography and original music. It also won a total of five audience awards at the 2012 SevenArt Awards, for which 3,200 readers voted.

List of awards and nominations
Award	Category	Recipients and nominees	Result
2012 Hellenic Film Academy Awards	Best Music	Yannis Aiolou	Won
2012 Hellenic Film Academy Awards	Best Production Design	Giorgos Georgiou	Won
2012 Hellenic Film Academy Awards	Best Costumes Design	Giorgos Georgiou	Won
2012 Hellenic Film Academy Awards	Best Photography	Yannis Drakoularakos	Nominated
2012 Hellenic Film Academy Awards	Best Actor	Yannis Stankoglou	Nominated
SevenArt Awards	Best Film	Christmas Tango	Won
SevenArt Awards	Best Actor	Yiannis Stankoglou	Won
SevenArt Awards	Best Supporting Actor	Antinoos Albanis	Won
SevenArt Awards	Best Supporting Actress	Vicky Papadopoulou	Won
SevenArt Awards	Best Music	Yiannis Aeolou	Won

== See also ==
- List of Christmas films
