= Kora Karvouni =

Greek actress

Kora Karvouni Κόρα Καρβούνη
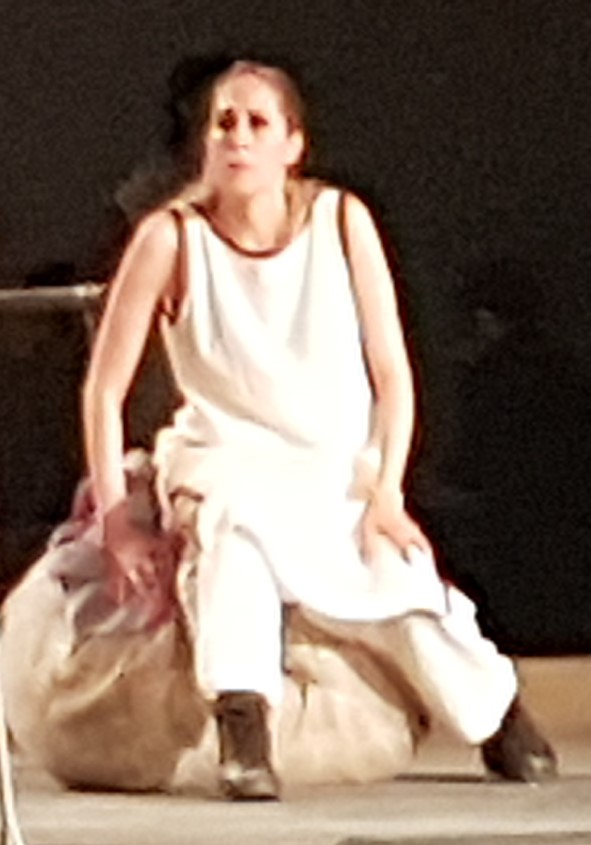
- Kora Karvouni as Antigone in Oedipus at Colonus, Veakeio theatre, Piraeus, September 2017
- Born: 22 April 1980 (age 46); Athens, Greece
- Years active: 2002-present
- Awards: Athinorama Theatre Award for Best Actress, 2006, "The Sexual Neuroses of Our Parents"

Kora Karvouni (Greek: Κόρα Καρβούνη) (born 22 April 1980 in Athens, Greece) is a Greek stage and television actress. She graduated from the Greek National Theatre Drama School with a distinction in 2002. She has performed in various theatre productions in Greece, U.S.A., South Korea and Italy collaborating with notable directors such as Peter Stein, Anatoly Vasiliev, Dimiter Gotscheff and Laurent Chétouane. She has also participated in Greek television productions.

== Stage credits ==
- 2002-2003: Patras Municipal and Regional Theatre: Cyrano de Bergerac by Edmond Rostand, direction: Niketi Kontouri
- 2003: National Theatre of Greece: Medea by Euripides, direction: Stathis Livathinos (performed in Epidaurus and other Greek stages)
- 2004: Theatro tou Neou Kosmou: The Lieutenant of Inishmore by Martin McDonagh, direction: Vaggelis Theodoropoulos
- 2004: National Theatre of Greece: Hippolytus by Euripides, direction: Vassilis Nikolaidis (performed in Epidaurus and other Greek stages)
- 2005: Theatro tou Neou Kosmou: Woyzeck by Georg Büchner, direction: Vaggelis Theodoropoulos
- 2005: National Theatre of Greece: The Bacchae by Euripides, direction: Sotiris Hatzakis (performed in Epidaurus and other Greek stages)
- 2005-2007: Theatro tou Neou Kosmou: The Sexual Neuroses of Our Parents by Lukas Bärfuss, direction: Vaggelis Theodoropoulos
- 2006: Theatro tou Neou Kosmou and Athens and Epidaurus Festival: Othello by William Shakespeare, direction: Vaggelis Theodoropoulos
- 2007: National Theatre of Greece and Athens and Epidaurus Festival: Elektra by Sophokles, direction: Peter Stein
- 2008: Patras Municipal and Regional Theatre: Medea by Euripides, direction: Anatoly Vasiliev
- 2008: National Theatre of Greece: The Diary of a Scoundrel by Alexander Ostrovsky, direction: Yannis Kakleas
- 2009: National Theatre of Greece: The Nightmare of Happiness by Justine del Corte, direction: Yannis Houvardas
- 2009: National Theatre of Greece and Athens and Epidaurus Festival: The Persians by Aeschylus, direction: Dimiter Gotscheff
- 2010: National Theatre of Greece: Marat/Sade by Peter Weiss, direction: Efi Theodorou
- 2010: National Theatre of Greece: Leonce and Lena by Georg Büchner, direction: Laurent Chétouane
- 2010:National Theatre of Greece: Orestes by Euripides, direction: Yannis Houvardas
- 2010-2011: Theatro Odou Kefallinias: The House of Bernarda Alba by Federico García Lorca, direction: Stathis Livathinos
- 2011: Athens and Epidaurus Festival: The Throne of Atreus by Aris Retsos, direction: Aris Retsos

== Television credits ==
- 2009: "Karyotakis" (ET1), direction: Tassos Psarras
- 2009: "Agria Paidia" (MEGA Channel), direction: Christos Nikoleris
- 2008: "10" based on the novel of M. Karagatsis (Alpha Channel), direction: Pigi Dimitrakopoulou
- 2007: "Amina Zonis" based on the novel of Petros Markaris (NET), direction: Fillipos Tsitos
- 2015: "10i Entoli" (Alpha Channel), direction: Panos Kokkinopoulos

== Cinema credits ==
- 2010: "Tungsten", direction: Giorgos Georgopoulos
- 2011: J.A.C.E.
- 2013: September

== Nominations and awards ==
- 2007: Nominated for the Melina Mercouri Award
- 2006: Won the Best Actress Award of Athinorama Magazine
- 2014: Won the Best Actress Award of Hellenic Film Academy for September
