= Franz Krech =

German army officer

Major General (Generalmajor) Franz Krech (23 June 1889 – 27 April 1944) was the German commander of the 41st Fortress Division of the Wehrmacht during the World War II Axis occupation of Greece. He was ambushed and killed by a platoon of the Greek People's Liberation Army (ELAS) in Molaoi, Laconia. It led to harsh reprisals by the occupying forces and contributed to the declaration of Peloponnese as an "operational zone", i.e. a war zone.

== Biography ==
Franz Krech was born on 23 June 1889 in Görlitz. He joined the Deutsches Heer on the 2nd of May, 1908 and became a lieutenant on 19 August 1909. He saw combat during World War I as part of the Infanterie-Regiment „von Courbière“ (2. Posensches) Nr. 19. He received both classes of the 1914 Iron Cross and the Honour Cross of the World War 1914/1918 for combatants, the Wound Badge in black and the Military Merit Cross 3rd Class with War Decoration. Postwar, he remained in the Reichswehr and the Wehrmacht, later receiving the Wehrmacht Long Service Award. During the outbreak of World War II he was an Oberst, serving as an Army Selection Inspector.

== Ambush ==
A platoon of the 8th (Laconian) Regiment of ELAS, under 2nd Lieutenant Manolis Stathakis, ambushed the German major general in the region of Laconia on 27 April 1944. Krech and four members of his escort were killed. The day before, German Major General Heinrich Kreipe had been kidnapped by British agents and Greek civilian activists in Crete.

The American OSS and the British SOE, with the collaboration of the Greek National Liberation Front, spread the story, for propaganda reasons (see Operation Hemlock) but also to prevent German reprisals, that Krech had been executed by the Gestapo as a "dissident" and they publicized a forged letter calling on German soldiers to desert. It had also been alleged that Krech, along with Kreipe, had participated in the anti-Hitler "Free Germany" movement.

== Reprisals ==
On 1 May, the Germans executed 200 communist prisoners at Kaisariani, a suburb of Athens. According to Hellmuth Felmy's apology in the Nuremberg trials, the head of the collaborationist Security Battalions in Peloponnese, Colonel Dionysios Papadongonas, who was a friend of Krech, ordered on his own initiative the execution of further 100 members or suspected members of the Resistance. At the same time, the Germans killed another 25 in Athens. In total, at least 325 people were executed, and more executions followed in the wake of 117th Jäger Division's march from Molaoi to Sparti. Felmy justified the number of the killings with Krech's status as a divisional commander. The orders for reprisals were given by the Higher Military Commander of Peloponnese, Major General Karl von Le Suire.

In May, the region of Peloponnese was declared an "operational zone", i.e., a war zone.

== Promotion ==
Krech was posthumously promoted to lieutenant general (Generalleutnant) by Hitler and buried in Athens.
