= J.A.C.E. =

2011 film

- Film poster
- Directed by: Menelaos Karamaghiolis
- Written by: Menelaos Karamaghiolis; Nicholas Panoutsopoulos
- Produced by: Menelaos Karamaghiolis
- Starring: Stefania Goulioti; Alban Ukaj
- Cinematography: Giorgos Frentzos
- Release dates: 24 October 2011 (Tokyo); 10 November 2011 (Thessaloniki)
- Running time: 142 minutes
- Country: Greece
- Languages: Greek, Albanian, English

J.A.C.E. (Just Another Confused Elephant) is a 2011 Greek drama film directed by Menelaos Karamaghiolis. It was screened in the City To City section at the 2013 Toronto International Film Festival.

== Cast ==
- Stefania Goulioti as Maria
- Alban Ukaj as Jace
- Kora Karvouni as Alma
- Ieronymos Kaletsanos as Antonio
- Minas Hatzisavvas as Officer Dimitriou
- Yannis Tsortekis as Thomas Tepelenis
- Akilas Karazisis as Dr. Markos Kruger
- Diogo Infante as Nikolas
- Franco Trevisi as Andrei
- Christos Loulis as Father
- Argyris Xafis as Angelos Karras
- Kostas Berikopoulos as Officer Banias

== Awards ==
Stefania Goulioti won the Best Actress award at the Thessaloniki Film Festival. Menelaos Karamaghiolis was nominated for Tokyo Grand Prix at the Tokyo International Film Festival.
