= The Daughter (2012 film) =

2012 film

- Film poster
- Directed by: Thanos Anastopoulos
- Written by: Vasilis Giatsis; Thanos Anastopoulos
- Starring: Savina Alimani
- Cinematography: Elias Adamis
- Release date: 4 October 2012
- Running time: 87 minutes
- Country: Greece
- Language: Greek

The Daughter (Greek: Η Κόρη, translit. I Kori) is a 2012 Greek drama film directed by Thanos Anastopoulos. It was screened in the City to City section at the 2013 Toronto International Film Festival.

== Cast ==
- Savina Alimani as Myrto
- Angelos Papadimas as Aggelos
- Giorgos Symeonidis as Father
- Ieronymos Kaletsanos as Business Partner
- Ornela Kapetani as Mother
- Theodora Tzimou as Business Partner's Wife
