= Stelios Mainas =

Greek actor

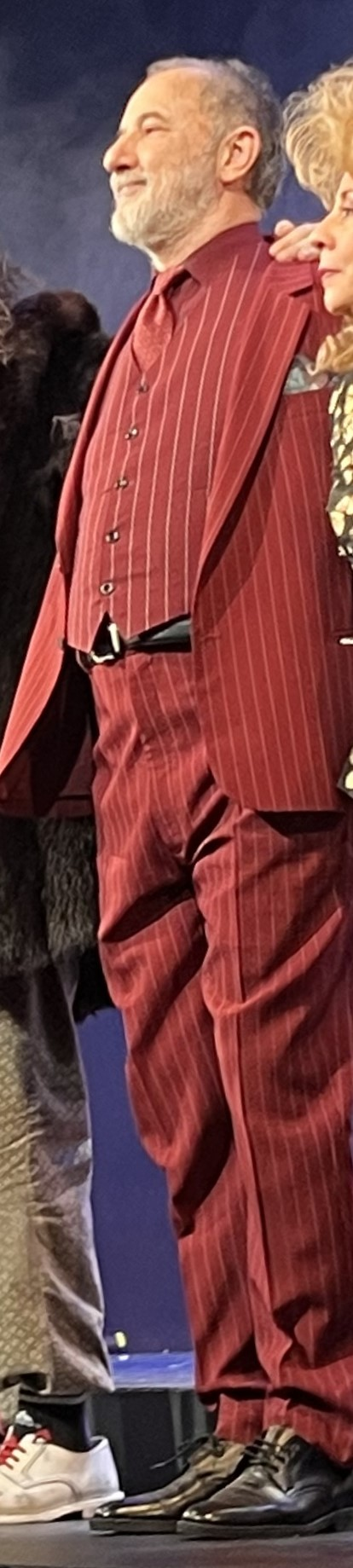
- Born: 1 October 1957 (age 69); Ermoupoli, Syros, Greece
- Occupation: Actor
- Years active: 1982–present

Stelios Mainas (Greek: Στέλιος Μάινας; born 1 October 1957 in Ermoupoli, Syros) is a Greek actor. He graduated Veakis Drama School in 1982 and has been working as a stage, cinema and television actor ever since. His first film role was in the 1984 movie Loafing and Camouflage. He became widely known in Greece from the comedy series Oi Men Kai Oi Den and the 1998 road movie Valkanisateur. He has also appeared in movies like Hard Goodbyes: My Father (2002) and A Touch of Spice (2003). He is married to actress Katia Sperelaki. They have one son. Stelios Mainas has won the Best Actor Award in Hellenic Film Academy Awards for his role in film Tetarti 4:45.

== Filmography ==
- Loafing and Camouflage (1984)
- Vios Kai Politeia (1987)
- Lipotaktis (1988)
- Pano Kato kai Plagios (1992)
- Valkanisateur (1997)
- Brazileiro (2001)
- Hard Goodbyes: My Father (2002)
- A Touch of Spice (2003)
- Guiness (2009)
- Ap' Ta Kokkala Vgalmena (2011)
- Tetarti 04:45 (2015)
- 1968 (2018)

== Television ==
- I Men... ke I Den (1993-1996)
- Dolce Vita (1995)
- Κωνσταντίνου και Ελένης (1999)
- Μαύρα Μεσάνυχτα (2007-2009)
- To Nisi (2010-2011)
