= Andreas Konstantinou =

Greek actor

- Born: November 17, 1982 (age 43); Tübingen, Germany
- Occupation: Actor
- Years active: 1995-present

Andreas Konstantinou (Greek: Ανδρέας Κωνσταντίνου) is a Greek actor. He was born on November 17, 1982 in Tübingen, Germany and grew up in Thessaloniki. He has appeared in more than twelve films since 1995.

== Filmography ==
=== Film ===
Year	Title	Role	Notes
2007	Cool	Minos Stavrakomanios	Film debut
2010	Artherapy	Himself	
2010	The death I dreamed of	Christos	
2011	Loafing and Camouflage: Sirens at Land	reporter	
2011	Paradise	Antonis	
2013	Little England	Spyros Maltabes	
2015	Riversides	Yannis	
2015	Ouzo Tsitsanis	Vassilis Tsitsanis	
2016	The Stopover	Chrystos	
2017	The Last Note	Napoleon Soukatzidis	
2017	Success Story	Gennadi Archvadze	
2018	The silence of fish when they die	Makis	Short film
2018	Unmoved River	Petros	
2019	The silence of the forest	man	Short film
2019	Basil	Argyris	Short film
2019	The interrogation	Michalis	
2019	Eftychia	Nikos Alexiou	
2020	HouHou	Fakis	Short film
2020	Monday	Christos	
2020	54/the Blind Turtle and the Endless Sea		Short film
2020	Umbilical	Filippos	Short film
2021	Töchter		
2021	.dog	father	
2022	Α Night at the Theater	Odysseus	
2023	Firebug		Short film

=== Television ===
Year	Title	Role	Notes	Reference
2019-2020	Wild Bees	Sergios Sevastos	10 episodes	
2021	Cart Postale	Joseph Markakis	Lead role, 12 episodes	
2023	Milky Way	Yorgos	TV mini series	
2023-2024	After the fire	Odysseas Ragkos	Lead role, 24 episodes (12 unaired)	
2024-2025	Transparent Love		Main role, 35 episodes	Upcoming tv series

== Awards ==
Year	Award	Film	Result
2018	Hellenic Film Academy Award for Best Actor	The Last Note	Won
