= Katia Goulioni =

Greek actress and costume designer

Katia Goulioni (Greek: Κάτια Γκουλιώνη; born 1981 in Athens) is a Greek actress and costume designer. Goulioni's acting credits include Polyxeni, Eftyhia and Still River. She was also the costume designer on Still River.

Goulioni studied at the Athens Academy of Drama. Her first film was the 2010 drama In the Woods directed by Angelos Frantzis. She collaborated with Frantzis again to star in the film Symptoma.

== Awards ==
Year	Award	Film	Result
2018	Hellenic Film Academy Awards for best actress	Polyxeni	Won
