= The City of Children =

2011 film

- Directed by: Giorgos Gikapeppas
- Written by: Giorgos Gikapeppas
- Produced by: Giorgos Gikapeppas
- Starring: Kika Georgiou
- Cinematography: Kostas Triandafyllou
- Release date: 6 November 2011
- Running time: 96 minutes
- Country: Greece
- Language: Greek

The City of Children (Greek: Η Πόλη των Παιδιών, translit. I poli ton paidion) is a 2011 Greek drama film directed by Giorgos Gikapeppas.

== Cast ==
- Kika Georgiou as Nadine
- Giorgos Ziovas as Antonis
- Vassilis Bisbikis as Fotis
- Anna Kalaitzidou as Dina
- Iosif Polyzoidis as Nadine's Neighbor
- Dimitris Kotzias as Tasos
- Natalia Kalimeratzi as Liza
- Maria Tsima as Vaso
- Iro Loupi as Marina
- Leonidas Kakouris as Spyros
- Mihalis Sarantis as Giannis
