= Xenia (film) =

- French film poster
- Directed by: Panos H. Koutras
- Written by: Panagiotis Evangelidis; Panos H. Koutras
- Produced by: Alexandra Boussiou; Eleni Kossyfidou; Panos H. Koutras
- Starring: Kostas Nikouli; Nikos Gelia; Patty Pravo
- Cinematography: Hélène Louvart; Simos Sarketzis
- Edited by: Yorgos Lamprinos
- Music by: Delaney Blue
- Distributed by: Feelgood Entertainment (Greece); Pyramide Distribution (France)
- Release dates: 19 May 2014 (Cannes); 18 June 2014 (France)
- Running time: 128 minutes
- Countries: Greece; France; Belgium
- Languages: Greek; Albanian

Xenia (Greek: Ξενία lit. xenia) is a 2014 drama film directed by Panos H. Koutras. It was selected to compete in the Un Certain Regard section at the 2014 Cannes Film Festival, and in the Contemporary World Cinema section at the 2014 Toronto International Film Festival. It was the Greek entry for the Best Foreign Language Film award at the 88th Academy Awards, but it was not nominated. Xenia has won six awards from the Hellenic Film Academy. At the award ceremony, Koutras refused to receive two of them (for the best script and the best director) until the law on granting Greek citizenship to second-generation immigrants is changed.

Main characters in the film are fans of Italian singer Patty Pravo, who makes a cameo appearance as herself towards the end of the story. The film features three songs from Pravo's repertoire: "Sentimento", "Tutt'al più", and "La bambola".

== Plot ==
The film tells about two Albanian Greek-born brothers, Dany, 15, who is gay, and Odysseas (Ody), 18. Their mother, an alcoholic singer, has recently died, and their biological Greek father has cut ties with them a long time ago. Facing the threat of deportation, the brothers go on a road trip from Athens to Thessaloniki looking for their Greek father, and with him the possibility of gaining Greek citizenship. They are obsessed with the songs of the Italian singer Patty Pravo, and Ody, who has a good voice, plans to sing one of her songs in a TV talent contest Greek Star.

== Cast ==
- Kostas Nikouli as Dany
- Nikos Gelia as Odysseas
- Yannis Stankoglou as Lefteris
- Marissa Triandafyllidou as Vivi
- Aggelos Papadimitriou as Tassos
- Romanna Lobats as Maria-Sonia
- Patty Pravo as herself
- Ioulios Tziatas as Moustafa

== Critical reception ==
Xenia met with generally favourable reviews. It has an 86% approval rating on Rotten Tomatoes and holds a weighted average of 62/100 on Metacritic. The critics noted influences from Pedro Almodóvar, complimented the dynamic between the two main characters, but held criticism towards its long running time.

== See also ==
- List of submissions to the 88th Academy Awards for Best Foreign Language Film
- List of Greek submissions for the Academy Award for Best Foreign Language Film
