= Chevalier (2015 film) =

2015 film

- Film poster
- Directed by: Athina Rachel Tsangari
- Written by: Efthymis Filippou; Athina Rachel Tsangari
- Produced by: Maria Hatzakou; Christos V. Konstantakopoulos
- Starring: Yiorgos Kendros; Panos Koronis; Vangelis Mourikis; Makis Papadimitriou; Yorgos Pirpassopoulos; Sakis Rouvas
- Cinematography: Christos Karamanis
- Edited by: Matthew Johnson; Yorgos Mavropsaridis
- Production companies: Faliro House Productions; Greek Film Center; Haos Film
- Distributed by: Feelgood Entertainment
- Release dates: 12 August 2015 (Locarno); 26 November 2015 (Greece)
- Running time: 105 minutes
- Country: Greece
- Language: Greek

Chevalier is a 2015 Greek comedy film directed by Athina Rachel Tsangari and co-written by Tsangari and Efthymis Filippou. It was screened in the Contemporary World Cinema section of the 2015 Toronto International Film Festival. It was selected as the Greek entry for the Best Foreign Language Film at the 89th Academy Awards but it was not nominated.

== Plot ==
Six men — The Doctor, Yorgos, Josef, Dimitris, Yannis and Christos — are enjoying a fishing trip on the Aegean Sea in a luxury yacht. All the men are related either professionally or personally: The Doctor works with and mentors Christos, the former boyfriend of his daughter Anna; Yannis is the Doctor's son-in-law; Dimitris is Yannis' brother; and Josef and Yorgos are partners who are close friends with the Doctor.

The final night before they head out on a multi-day journey back to Athens they play a game in which one player thinks of a person on the boat and the others must ask metaphorical questions such as what type of animal or fruit the person would be in order to guess the person the player is thinking of. Josef is offended when Yorgos guesses he is the person in question that resembles a pineapple. Josef correctly guesses that the person who is a pineapple is the cabin boy. In a huff, Yorgos quits playing saying that Josef isn't the best, he is only the person who is best at that particular game.

Trying to decide on an alternate game to play Christos suggests they play a game he played the previous year called Chevalier. In Chevalier the men set up tasks for them all to perform and whoever wins the most rounds wins a Chevalier signet ring. Yorgos agrees to play, but only if the men compete for who is the best in general, meaning that they will not only judge each other on tasks but on their personality and habits with anything and everything up for grabs. The only one with a Chevalier ring is the Doctor, but as he refuses to lend his ring to the winner, they decide that a ring will be purchased when the group arrives in Athens.

The men immediately begin to judge each other on how they sleep, what they wear, how they drink their coffee. Each contestant also selects a competition for all of the men to compete in including who can clean the fastest, and who can skip stones the best. For his competition Yannis chooses to have the men take pictures of their penis fully erect to judge who has the largest one. Only Joseph is unable to achieve an erection, becoming upset.

Once docked at Athens the men decide to stay on board for several more days to fully complete their competition. The doctor draws blood for each of the men but Dimitris refuses to have his blood taken which loses him points in the competition. Christos is upset to discover he has high cholesterol. During dinner Dimitris prepares a performance of Lovin' You which he lipsynchs to. Wanting to encourage his brother Yannis lights sparklers and dances behind him on the dock. After the performance the Doctor coldly rebukes Yannis for being careless with the sparklers. Becoming enraged Yannis lashes out at the Doctor accusing him of disliking him because his daughter Anna is infertile. He then mocks Christos telling him that Anna shared his sexual inadequacies with Yannis and together they make fun of him. Christos is distraught and attacks Yannis and the two men must be separated.

Before the final competition Yorgos prepares a speech where he tells the men that he is shared a special moment with all of them during the trip. He then cuts his hand and asks the men to become blood brothers with him. All the men refuse, except Dimitris who agrees to the blood pact. Rather than slitting his hand, he pulls down his pants and cuts his upper butt cheek before grabbing Yorgos hand and clasping it to him to make them blood brothers.

In the kitchen the cook and his assistant begin to play Chevalier against one another, with the assistant docking points from his employer because he is balding.

Outside the men, having finally finished the game, disembark from the boat and head to their cars to go home. Yorgos climbs on his motorbike, with the chevalier ring gleaming on his hand.

== Cast ==
- Yiorgos Kendros as the Doctor
- Panos Koronis as Yorgos
- Vangelis Mourikis as Josef Nikolaou
- Makis Papadimitriou as Dimitris
- Yorgos Pirpassopoulos as Yannis
- Sakis Rouvas as Christos
- Giannis Drakopoulos as the Steward
- Nikos Orphanos as the Captain
- Kostas Filippoglou as the Cook

== Release ==
Chevalier premiered at the Locarno International Film Festival on 12 August 2015 before being released theatrically in Greece on 26 November 2015. It was released in Germany on 21 April 2016 and had a positive review in Der Spiegel.

=== Critical reception ===
The film received positive reviews from critics. On Rotten Tomatoes, the film has an 82% score based on 68 reviews, with an average rating of 6.8/10. Metacritic reports a 76 out of 100 rating based on 18 critics, indicating "generally favorable reviews".

== Accolades ==
It was named the Best Film in the Official Competition at the London Film Festival, on 17 October 2015. The jury described it as "both a hilarious comedy and a deeply disturbing statement on the condition of western humanity."

== See also ==
- List of submissions to the 89th Academy Awards for Best Foreign Language Film
- List of Greek submissions for the Academy Award for Best Foreign Language Film
