= September (2013 film) =

2013 film

- Film poster
- Directed by: Penny Panayotopoulou
- Written by: Kallia Papadaki; Penny Panayotopoulou
- Starring: Nikos Diamandis
- Release date: 30 June 2013 (Karlovy)
- Running time: 105 minutes
- Country: Greece
- Language: Greek

September is a 2013 Greek drama film directed by Penny Panayotopoulou. It was screened in the city to city section at the 2013 Toronto International Film Festival.

== Cast ==
- Nikos Diamandis
- Kora Karvouni as Ana
- Youlika Skafida as Charwoman
- Maria Skoula as Sofia
- Christos Stergioglou
