= Paradise (2011 film) =

2011 film

- Film poster
- Directed by: Panagiotis Fafoutis
- Produced by: Maria Drandaki; Panagiotis Fafoutis
- Starring: Natasa Zaga
- Cinematography: Yorgos Papandrikopoulos
- Release date: 9 November 2011 (Thessaloniki)
- Running time: 105 minutes
- Country: Greece
- Language: Greek

Paradise (Greek: παράδεισος, translit. Paradeisos) is a 2011 Greek romance film directed by Panagiotis Fafoutis. The film follows four interconnected stories around a carnival float of street parade.

== Cast ==
- Natasa Zaga as Marianna
- Mihalis Fotopoulos as Mihalis
- Olia Lazaridou as Vicky
- Errikos Litsis as Ilias
- Christos Loulis as Sokratis
- Konstadinos Avarikiotis as Nikos
- Maria Skoula as Evgenia
- Andreas Konstantinou as Antonis
- Lila Mpaklesi as Panagiota
- Vangelis Alexandris as Fantasmas
- Thanasis Vlavianos as Patis
- Liza Neohoriti as Krystallina
