= Wednesday 04:45 =

- Film poster
- Greek: Tetarti 04:45
- Directed by: Alexis Alexiou
- Starring: Stelios Mainas; Dimitris Tzoumakis; Maria Nafpliotou
- Release date: 12 March 2015
- Running time: 116 minutes
- Country: Greece
- Languages: Greek; Romanian

Wednesday 04:45 (Greek: Tetarti 04:45) is a Greek crime drama film written and directed by Alexis Alexiou. The film had entered both Karlovy Vary International Film Festival and Tribeca Film Festival.

== Cast ==
- Stelios Mainas as Stelios
- Dimitris Tzoumakis as Vassos
- Adam Bousdoukos as the driver
- Giorgos Symeonidis as Omer
- Maria Nafpliotou as Sofia, Stelios' wife
- Mimi Brănescu as The Romanian

== Release ==
The film was released on 12 March 2015 in Greece. It was also released in United States, South Korea, Czech Republic, Belgium, Israel, UK, Slovakia, Italy and Germany.

== Reception ==
=== Accolades ===
The film was nominated for 12 Hellenic Film Academy Awards, winning 9, including Best Film.
