= Stratos (film) =

2014 film

- Directed by: Yannis Economides
- Written by: Yannis Economides; Thanos Xiros; Vangelis Mourikis; Christos V. Konstantakopoulos; Harry Lagoussis
- Starring: Vangelis Mourikis
- Release dates: 11 February 2014 (Berlin); 27 March 2014 (Greece)
- Running time: 137 minutes
- Countries: Greece; Germany; Cyprus
- Language: Greek

Stratos (Greek: Το Μικρό Ψάρι, translit. To Mikro Psari - literally The Little Fish) is a 2014 Greek drama film directed by Yannis Economides. The film had its premiere in the competition section of the 64th Berlin International Film Festival.

== Cast ==
- Vangelis Mourikis
- Vicky Papadopoulou
- Petros Zervos
- Yannis Tsortekis
- Giorgos Giannopoulos
- Yannis Anastasakis
- Veronica Naujoks
