= Knifer =

2010 film

- Directed by: Yannis Economides
- Written by: Yannis Economides; Doris Avgerinopoulos
- Produced by: Panos Papahadzis
- Starring: Stathis Stamoulakatos
- Cinematography: Dimitris Katsaitis
- Edited by: Giannis Halkiadakis
- Distributed by: Feelgood Entertainment (Greece); Umedia (worldwide)
- Release date: 20 October 2010 (Greece)
- Running time: 108 minutes
- Countries: Cyprus; Greece
- Language: Greek

Knifer (Greek: Μαχαιροβγάλτης Macherovgaltis) is a 2010 Greek-Cypriot drama film directed by Yannis Economides. After his father's death, Nikos moves from Ptolemaida to Athens. His uncle offers him food and shelter while he starts taking care of his dogs. Alone in an isolated suburb, he's wearing down into his misery routine, till the moment his relationship with his aunt changes everything.

== Cast ==
- Stathis Stamoulakatos as Nikos
- Vangelis Mourikis as Alekos
- Maria Kallimani as Gogo
- Yannis Voulgarakis as Nikos' friend
- Yannis Anastasakis as Drunk man
- Nikol Drizi as Nikos' girl
- Konstadinos Siradakis as Waiter (as Kostas Syradakis)
