= Makis Papadimitriou =

Greek actor

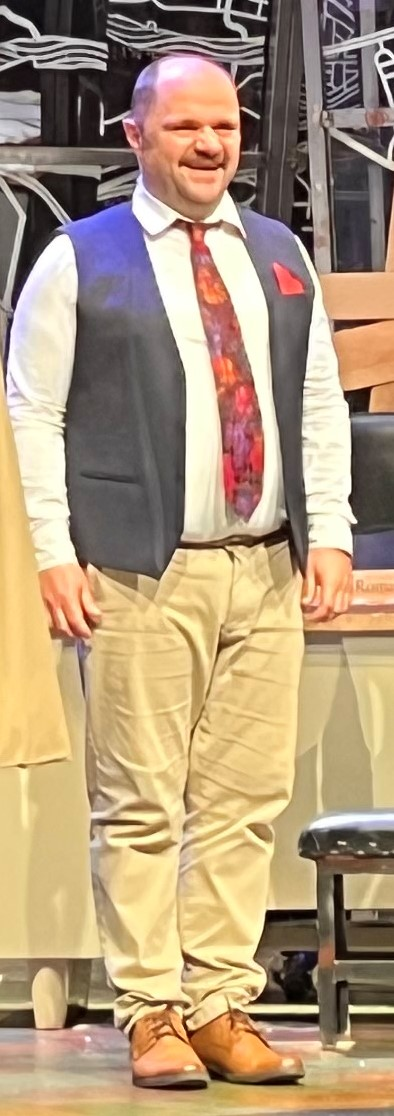
Makis Papadimitriou, 2023

Makis Papadimitriou (Greek: Μάκης Παπαδημητρίου; born on 1 January 1975) is a Greek actor. He graduated from National Theatre of Greece Drama School and has appeared in more than thirty films since 2003.

== Selected filmography ==
Year	Title	Role	Notes
2012	L		
2015	Chevalier		
2016	Suntan	Kostis	
2016	Amerika Square		
2016	The Stopover		
2018	Pity		
2022	Flux Gourmet	Stones	
