= Polyxeni =

2017 film

- Film poster
- Directed by: Dora Masklavanou
- Written by: Dora Masklavanou
- Produced by: Fenia Cossovitsa
- Starring: Katia Goulioni
- Cinematography: Claudio Bolivar
- Edited by: Dora Masklavanou
- Music by: Nikos Kypourgos
- Distributed by: Seven Films; Rosebud.21
- Release date: 14 December 2017
- Running time: 100 minutes
- Country: Greece
- Language: Greek
- Budget: €450,000
- Box office: $38,920

Polyxeni is a 2017 Greek drama film directed by Dora Masklavanou. It was selected as the Greek entry for the Best Foreign Language Film at the 91st Academy Awards, but it was not nominated.

== Cast ==
- Katia Goulioni as Polyxeni
- Özgür Emre Yildirim as Kerem
- Lydia Fotopoulou as Mother
- Akilas Karazisis as Father
- Alexandros Mylonas as Priest

== See also ==
- List of submissions to the 91st Academy Awards for Best Foreign Language Film
- List of Greek submissions for the Academy Award for Best Foreign Language Film
