= Amerika Square =

2016 film

- Film poster
- Directed by: Yannis Sakaridis
- Written by: Yannis Sakaridis
- Starring: Vassilis Koukalani; Yannis Stankoglou
- Release dates: 11 October 2016 (Busan IFF); 23 March 2017 (Greece)
- Running time: 86 minutes
- Country: Greece
- Language: Greek

Amerika Square (Greek: Πλατεία Αμερικής, Plateia Amerikis) is a 2016 Greek drama film directed by Yannis Sakaridis. It was selected as the Greek entry for the Best Foreign Language Film at the 90th Academy Awards, but it was not nominated.

== Plot ==
Nakos, a racist Greek nationalist, is unemployed and still lives with his parents at age 38. He tracks the increasing number of immigrants in his apartment building with disgust. His friend Billy, a tattoo artist, falls in love with African singer Tereza, but she wants to leave Greece. Tarek, a Syrian doctor, is also looking to flee the country with his daughter. Their stories merge when Tereza and Tarek's plans to escape are inadvertently thwarted by Nakos.

== Cast ==
- Vassilis Koukalani as Tarek
- Yannis Stankoglou as Billy
- Makis Papadimitriou as Nakos
- Alexandros Logothetis as Manolis
- Rea Pediaditaki as Nandia
- Themis Bazaka as Georgia
- Errikos Litsis as Stavros

== See also ==
- List of submissions to the 90th Academy Awards for Best Foreign Language Film
- List of Greek submissions for the Academy Award for Best Foreign Language Film
