= Boy Eating the Bird's Food =

2012 film by Ektoras Lygizos

- Theatrical release poster
- Greek: Το Αγόρι Τρώει το Φαγητό του Πουλιού
- Directed by: Ektoras Lygizos
- Screenplay by: Ektoras Lygizos
- Based on: Hunger by Knut Hamsun
- Produced by: Giorgos Karnavas; Ektoras Lygizos; Elina Psykou; Argyris Papadimitropoulos
- Starring: Yiannis Papadopoulos; Lila Baklesi; Vangelis Kommatas; Kharálampos Goyós
- Cinematography: Dimitris Kassimatis
- Edited by: Gregory Rentis
- Production companies: Stefi Productions; Guanaco; 2/35; Oxymoron Films; Fantasia Audiovisual Ltd.
- Release dates: 5 July 2012 (Karlovy IFF); 8 November 2012 (Greece)
- Running time: 80 minutes
- Country: Greece
- Language: Greek

Boy Eating the Bird's Food (Greek: Το Αγόρι Τρώει το Φαγητό του Πουλιού, romanized: To agori troei to fagito tou pouliou) is a 2012 Greek drama film written and directed by Ektoras Lygizos (in his feature directorial debut), loosely based on the 1890 novel Hunger by Knut Hamsun. It was selected as the Greek entry for the Best Foreign Language Film at the 86th Academy Awards, but it was not nominated.

== Synopsis ==
During the Greek crisis, a young man is forced to steal food from birds to survive.

== Cast ==
- Yiannis Papadopoulos as boy
- Lila Baklesi as girl
- Vangelis Kommatas as old man
- Kharálampos Goyós as musician at audition
- Kleopatra Peraki as woman in church
- Konstadinos Voudouris

== See also ==
- List of submissions to the 86th Academy Awards for Best Foreign Language Film
- List of Greek submissions for the Academy Award for Best International Feature Film
