= The Last Note =

- Directed by: Pantelis Voulgaris
- Written by: Ioanna Karystiani; Pantelis Voulgaris
- Produced by: Yiannis Iakovidis
- Starring: Andreas Konstantinou
- Cinematography: Simos Sarketzis
- Edited by: Takis Giannopoulos
- Music by: Alexander Voulgaris
- Release date: 26 October 2017
- Running time: 117 minutes
- Country: Greece
- Languages: Greek and German

The Last Note (Greek: Το Τελευταίο Σημείωμα, translit. To Teleftaio Simeioma) is a 2017 Greek drama film directed by Pantelis Voulgaris. It is based on the execution of 200 Greek political prisoners in reprisal for the killing of a German general by Greek partisans in 1944.

== Cast ==
- Andreas Konstantinou as Napoleon Soukatzidis
- André Hennicke as Karl Fischer
- Melia Kreiling as Hara Lioudaki
- Tasos Dimas as Kostas
- Yorgos Karamalegos as Nikos Mariakakis
- Aineias Tsamatis as Christos
- Vassilis Koukalani as Sarantos
- Loukas Kyriazis as Kovacs
- Konstantina Hatziathanasiou as Xenia
