= Suntan (2016 film) =

- Directed by: Argyris Papadimitropoulos
- Written by: Argyris Papadimitropoulos; Syllas Tzoumerkas
- Produced by: Phaedra Vokali; Argyris Papadimitropoulos
- Starring: Makis Papadimitriou; Elli Tringou
- Cinematography: Christos Karamanis
- Edited by: Napoleon Stratogiannakis
- Production companies: Oxymoron Films; Marni Films
- Release dates: 2 February 2016 (IFFR); 31 March 2016 (Greece)
- Running time: 104 minutes
- Country: Greece
- Languages: Greek; English
- Box office: $145,858 (Greece)

Suntan is a 2016 Greek drama film directed by Argyris Papadimitropoulos, from a screenplay by Papadimitropoulos and Syllas Tzoumerkas. It stars Makis Papadimitriou as a middle-aged general practitioner on a resort island who becomes obsessed with a young female patient. The film premiered at the International Film Festival Rotterdam on February 2, 2016, and was theatrically released in Greece on March 31, 2016. Critical response for Suntan has been positive.

== Plot ==
Kostis, the new general practitioner, arrives on the resort island Antiparos, and greets the mayor. The mayor tells that, outside of the summer months, the population is around 800 and life is quiet. Kostis settles in amid Christmas celebrations, meeting several people, among them Takis, a villager who crudely assures him that the island will be overflowing with hedonistic young women during the summer.

The summer comes along and Kostis treats a young tourist named Anna, who has injured her leg. Her friends–Alin, Mila, Jason, and Morten–insist on accompanying her into the examination room and behave obnoxiously. Kostis humors them and asks Anna several questions while filling out paperwork. Anna playfully turns the questions on Kostis, who admits that he is twice her age, 21. Before leaving, Anna suggests Kostis come with them to the beach.

Kostis leaves for the beach after he is done at work. Overweight and balding, Kostis stands out at the nude beach even more for having arrived fully dressed. After taking off some of his clothing, he makes a pretense toward asking Anna and her friends if they have a lighter. Recognizing him, they invite him to join them. Kostis watches as they frolic nude on the beach, later joining them in the water. When he swims over to Anna and asks how her leg is, she shows him by doing an underwater handstand and spreading her legs in front of him while she is upside down. Kostis, infatuated with Anna, begins hanging out at the beach after work and supplying her friends with free beer. On one occasion, he turns away an elderly woman who has complained of back pain so he can leave for the beach as soon as his office closes.

At the beach, Anna invites him to join a pool party. Though initially reluctant, Kostis chances upon Orestis, a former medical school colleague who is vacationing on the beach with his family. Overhearing Kostis' invitation, he encourages Kostis to go, as the parties have a reputation for hedonistic abandon; Kostis agrees. Once there, the host urges everyone to kiss whoever is near them. The partiers make out with each other, in both heterosexual and homosexual couplings, though Kostis is only interested in Anna. They start making out, but she turns to make out with others, leaving Kostis jealous. Anna chastises him, and he wanders away from the party, dejected. Orestis, who has also attended the party, consoles him, saying that such parties are not for middle-aged men such as them.

As Kostis spends more time ingratiating himself into Anna's company, the villagers complain about his behavior, such as turning away the elderly woman. Eventually, Anna invites him to the beach with her alone, and the two have sex. Ashamed at orgasming too quickly, Kostis apologizes. Anna brushes it aside and says he will have much time over the summer to make it up to her. However, Anna is nowhere to be found for the next few days. Kostis spends the bulk of his time searching the beaches and bars for her, becoming increasingly frustrated and drunken. Finding Kostis at a bar, Takis encourages him to carouse with him. They pick up a female tourist, who eventually grows frustrated with Takis' sexually aggressive behavior. Kostis stands up for her, annoying Takis, and she performs oral sex on Kostis to please him.

When Anna finally reappears, she happily jumps into his arms. Angry, Kostis berates her for leaving the island without telling him. When she becomes offended, he apologizes and professes his love for her, but she only becomes more adamant that she does not want to see him again. Crushed, Kostis begins stalking her, watching covertly as she has sex. When Kostis forcefully attempts to dance with her at a club, the bouncer throws him out. As his life falls apart, Kostis comes in hours late to the clinic during an emergency. The mayor, frustrated with Kostis' behavior, fires him. Kostis sullenly becomes drunk, assaults one of Anna's friends, and kidnaps her. After drugging her and dragging her unconscious body back to the clinic, he takes off her shorts but doesn't go through with raping her. Upon checking her pulse, he begins crying, then cleans the original wound on her leg, and starts to restitch it, still sobbing.

== Cast ==
- Makis Papadimitriou as Kostis
- Elli Tringou as Anna
- Hara Kotsali as Alin
- Milou Van Groessen as Mila
- Dimi Hart as Jason
- Marcus Collen as Morten
- Yannis Tsortekis as Takis
- Pavlos Orkopoulos as the mayor
- Syllas Tzoumerkas as Orestis
- Yannis Economides as camping owner

== Release ==
Suntan premiered at the International Film Festival Rotterdam on 2 February 2016. It opened in Greece on 31 March 2016 and grossed $145,858.

== Reception ==
=== Critical response ===
Rotten Tomatoes, a review aggregator, reports that 75% of 24 surveyed critics gave the film a positive review; the average rating is 6.5/10. Metacritic rated it 59/100 based on nine reviews.

Writing for Variety, Jay Weissberg described it as "an unflinching depiction of one man's descent into an embarrassing vortex of desire, paired with a spectacular lack of self-awareness". Neil Young of The Hollywood Reporter wrote that it "wallows in the worst of human nature with little reward", becoming less plausible and increasingly difficult to find a sympathetic character as Kostis' midlife crisis worsens. At Screen Daily, Wendy Ide wrote, "A deftly handled cautionary tale, there is a compulsive, creeping horror to this portrait of a man losing all self-respect." In comparing the film to Death in Venice, Peter Bradshaw of The Guardian rated it 4/5 stars and called it "a superbly directed, quietly devastating film about an EasyJet Gustav von Aschenbach who embarrasses himself by falling in love with a younger beauty". Glenn Kenny of The New York Times selected it as a "NYT Critics' Pick" and wrote that it "captures a set of specific feelings: the exhilaration and embarrassment of falling, followed by the desperate denial that one has landed in a very bad place". The Los Angeles Times' Gary Goldstein wrote, "Following a pathetic, self-destructive antihero who lacks redeeming values or emotional growth proves a thoroughly unsatisfying journey in the dismal Greek import Suntan."

=== Accolades ===
Suntan won Best International Film at the Edinburgh International Film Festival and a Golden Duke for Best Acting at the Odesa International Film Festival. In Greece, it won Best Film, Best Director, Best Screenplay, Best Actor (Makis Padimitriou), and Best Supporting Actress (Elli Tringou) at the Hellenic Film Academy Awards.
