= List of Savri Maranan episodes =

This is a list of episodes for the show Savri Maranan.

== Series overview ==
Season	Episodes	Originally released	
Season	Episodes	First released	Last released
1	42	August 4, 2011	January 24, 2012
2	40	March 26, 2013	September 19, 2014
3	40	March 11, 2016	August 5, 2016
4	40	November 3, 2017	July 13, 2018
5	40	December 14, 2018	September 13, 2019
6	41 (Note: Originally 40 episodes were produced, but during the COVID-19 pandemic a special episode was produced and aired on May 1, 2020 as part of Season 6)	January 3, 2020	October 23, 2020
7	40	October 21, 2021	November 4, 2022
8	40	March 10, 2023	March 14, 2025

== Episodes ==
=== Season 1 (2011–12) ===
No. overall	No. in season	Title (Hebrew)	Title (English)	Family	Original air date
1	1	"הבייביסיטר"	"The Babysitter"	Hasson Family	August 4, 2011
Shay and Shani want to go to the spa and leave their girls with a new babysitter. Shay leaves a camera too, and in the Hasson family everybody wants to see. Silvan hides a secret and he thinks that everybody knows.
2	2	"טעות ענקית"	"Huge Mistake"	Rosen Family	August 10, 2011
Riki wants to go on a vacation but she needs to switch the turns of the Friday dinner. Guest stars from the Hasson Family: Yehoram Gaon as Silvan Hasson, Yona Elian as Rachel Hasson, Yamit Sol as Orna Katz, Kobi Marziano as Manny Hasson, Ami Smolartchik as Moshe Katz, Tamara Klingon as Alin Hasson
3	3	"איציק השמח"	"Happy Itzik"	Hasson Family	August 11, 2011
The computer is broken a moment before the dinner. Shay wants to go with someone to eat dinner in a fancy restaurant. And the family tries to know who is Happy Itzik.
4	4	"ערב חג"	"Rosh Hashana's eve"	Rosen Family	August 24, 2011
Rosh Hashana is coming soon, and the family need to decide where they will celebrate the holiday. Guest stars from the Hasson Family: Yona Elian as Rachel Hasson
5	5	"שבת בבוקר יום קשה"	"Saturday Morning, Hard Day"	Hasson Family	August 27, 2011
The Hasson family celebrates an event and Shay and Shani don't know how much money to give.
6	6	"תסמונת שטוקלוהם"	"Stockholm Syndrome"	Rosen Family	August 31, 2011
On the way to the Rosens' house, a lot of policemen go to the Hassons' house and Shani gets worried. Special guest star: Asaf Astar as the thief Guest stars from the Hasson Family: Yehoram Gaon as Silvan Hasson, Yona Elian as Rachel Hasson, Edna Blilious as Meyrav Hasson, Yamit Sol as Orna Katz, Kobi Marziano as Manny Hasson, Ami Smolartchik as Moshe Katz, Tamara Klingon as Alin Hasson
7	7	"אין עזרה"	"No Help"	Hasson Family	September 9, 2011
The Hasson family celebrates Rachel 60 in age 63. All the family watches a game show that was recorded the day before. Special guest star: Oded Menashe as the game show presenter
8	8	"אצא לי אל היער"	"I'll Go to the Forest"	Rosen Family	September 10, 2011
The Rosen family goes to a picnic. Shay tries to find a place that he really liked in his past.
9	9	"עניין של חמש דקות"	"A Five Minutes Thing"	Hasson Family	September 11, 2011
Shay and his friend Tzvi want to go to the beach. They get stuck in the Hassons' house.
10	10	"חתונה מוקדמת"	"Early Wedding"	Rosen Family	September 16, 2011
The family watches Itamar and Michal's wedding video. Guest stars: Gala Kogan as Adam's date, Simon Rosenfeld as Uncle Shmuel Guest stars from the Hasson Family: Yehoram Gaon as Silvan Hasson, Yona Elian as Rachel Hasson, Edna Blilious as Meyrav Hasson, Yamit Sol as Orna Katz, Kobi Marziano as Manny Hasson, Ami Smolartchik as Moshe Katz, Tamara Klingon as Alin Hasson
11	11	"כינים"	"Lice	Hasson Family	September 23, 2011
Shay and Shani's girls get lice, and Meyrav brings her new boyfriend.
12	12	"בראש השנה"	"In Rosh HaShana"	Hasson Family	September 30, 2011
Riki, Pinchas and Adam come to the Hassons' house for Rosh Hashana. Guest stars from the Rosen Family: Tuvia Tzafir as Pinchas Rosen, Sandra Sade as Riki Rosen, Tom Avni as Adam Rosen
13	13	"ציור"	"Drawing"	Rosen Family	October 1, 2011
In the car, Shay and Shani's girl draws a drawing. Adam brings a new date, Michal Amdursky. Riki's worried about the drawing. Special guest star: Michal Amdursky as herself
14	14	"מגדלי חסון"	"Hasson Towers"	Hasson Family	October 8, 2011
Shay leaves Itamar at the Hassons' house for 30 minutes. After he comes back there is a big fight. Shay thinks it's Itamar's fault. Guest stars from the Rosen Family: Yaniv Polishuk as Itamar Rosen
15	15	"פטיש מסמר"	"Hammer and Nail"	Rosen Family	October 14, 2011
Shay and Shani come to the Rossens' house to celebrate Sukkot. The boys try to build Sukkah and the girls make decorations.
16	16	"טרוריסטה"	"Terrorista"	Hasson Family	October 15, 2011
Alin's uncle comes to visit after he was appointed senior minister in Russia. Everybody's exited for the visit but a surprise is waiting for them.
17	17	"הדוד שמואל"	"Uncle Shmuel"	Rosen Family	October 21, 2011
Riki gets a message that Uncle Shmuel is dead. She waits for a phone call to know what Uncle Shmuel gave her. Special guest star: Simon Rosenfeld as Uncle Shmuel
18	18	"ביבר"	"Biber"	Hasson Family	October 22, 2011
Shay bought a hamster for the girls, and they called it Biber. Shani is angry about him. Silvan gives the boys an assignment, to glue PVC in the bedroom. Everything goes wrong when Biber the hamster gets lost.
19	19	"קשר עקיף"	"Indirect Connection"	Rosen Family	October 28, 2011
Adam brings a date who looks exactly like Michal. Shay and Itamar ask Riki to babysit their kids. Special guest star: Liat Har Lev as Ravit, Adan's date Note: Liat Har Lev acts as two characters in this episode, Michal and Ravit.
20	20	"ביסטרו"	"Bistro"	Hasson Family	October 29, 2011
The family decides that they have to celebrate the wedding anniversary of their parents in a fancy bistro. But the parents and Shay get stuck in the car.
21	21	"חס וחלילה בעזרת השם"	"God forbid, God willing"	Rosen Family	November 2, 2011
Riki tries to match Adam to Eynav, Yoel and Nili from the club's daughter. She is also a psychologist and a millionaire. Guest star: Tal Talmon as Eynav
22	22	"על רגל אחת"	"On One Foot"	Hasson Family	November 4, 2011
Rachel's foot is broken. Everybody in the family makes something for the dinner.
23	23	"סבתא חנה"	"Grandma Hannah"	Rosen Family	November 9, 2011
Grandma Hannah, Riki's mother, comes to visit. At the Friday dinner she is missing. Special guest star: Rut Gler as Grandma Hannah
24	24	"חמשת השלבים"	"The Five Levels"	Hasson Family	November 11, 2011
The whole family mourns, everyone for something different. Together they experience all the five levels of mourning.
25	25	"פלסטיקה"	"Plastics"	Rosen Family	November 16, 2011
Riki tells Shani she needs plastic surgeries. Adam brings a date that also tells Shani about the plastic surgeries. Guest star: Efrat Ryter as Adam's date
26	26	"כנס מחזור"	"Reunion"	Hasson Family	November 18, 2011
Silvan and Rachel want a quite evening but their kids want things from them. Meyrav needs the house for a date, Orna runs away from Moshe, Shay and Shani need a babysitter and Manny forgets his keys.
27	27	"קליסיקה מודרנית"	"Modern Classicv	Rosen Family	November 25, 2011
Pinchas surprised Riki with a flight over Israel for their 42nd anniversary. After that, the family watches a movie that was recorded on the flight. Guest star: Liraz Charhi as Canarit Adam's date
28	28	"סרוויס"	"(Table) Service"	Both Families	November 26, 2011
Shani celebrates her birthday with her family until Pinchas calls and tells Shay that Riki's finger got stuck in a table service cup.
29	29	"עולש"	"Chicory"	Rosen Family	December 2, 2011
Shay and Shani come to Friday dinner at the Rosens' house and there are no schnitzels as usual. Instead, there are wheatgrass and chicory. Shay notices that something isn't right with Riki.
30	30	"מינשנבלאך נגד קייזרס"	"Mönchengladbach vs. Kaiserslautern"	Hasson Family	December 2, 2011
Shay and Shani come for a visit and discover that they don't talk to each other. The reason is that the day before they played the lotto.
31	31	"הפתעה ליום אחד"	"Surprise For One Day"	Rosen Family	December 8, 2011
Shlomo, Riki's twin brother comes to visit. He tells everyone he's homosexual and everybody's surprised. Special guest star: Dov Glikman as Shlomo Pinkus
32	32	"אומלל נולד"	"A Poor Is Born"	Hasson Family	December 9, 2011
Meyrav passes a level in a reality show, Born To Sing. Meyrav asks everyone to lie about themselves. Guest star: Ruby Duenyas as photographer
33	33	"הצבי"	"Tzvi"	Rosen Family	December 16, 2011
Tzvi, Shay's friend, fights with his wife Yael. He comes to Shani and Shay's house and after that to the Friday dinner at the Rosens' house.
34	34	"שולחן ערוך"	"Set Table"	Hasson Family	December 16, 2011
Silvan orders a new table from the web. The family remembers about the old table.
35	35	"אמא מעולה"	"Great Mother"	Rosen Family	December 23, 2011
Shani tells Riki that she's a great mother. Itamar and Michal fight. Riki asks Shani who is right. There are three options.
36	36	"בסרט רע"	"In a Bad Movie"	Hasson Family	December 23, 2011
Shay comes sick to the Hassons' house. Orna and Meyrav want to fly to Los Angeles to surprise Orna's twin sister Efrat. The family calls Efrat from the computer. Special guest star: Yamit Sol as Efrat Hasson Note: Yamit Sol acts as two characters in this episode, Orna and Efrat.
37	37	"סודות"	"Secrets"	Hasson Family	December 30, 2011
In their car, Shay tells Shani that he had an affair with a Swedish woman. Silvan discovers that from his affair, a baby was born.
38	38	"משפחה כאילו"	"As Family"	Rosen Family	December 30, 2011
Michal tries to solve her and Itamar's problems with a TV show. The family watches it. Guest star: Tomer Shalom as the show presenter
39	39	"אחלה"	"Cool"	Rosen Family	January 2, 2012
Everything is cool until Raz's game gets off. Raz starts to talk about everyone.
40	40	"השרוף"	"The Burnt"	Rosen Family	January 9, 2012
Meyrav comes to the Rosens' house. Michal and Itamar fight all the time. Meyrav destroys everything she touches. Guest stars from the Hasson Family: Edna Blilious as Meyrav Hasson
41	41	"שלב שטונדה"	"Step Nap"	Both Families	January 17, 2012
Shay and Shani don't remember where they need to go. They compare the families about the Friday dinner preparations.
42	42	"שבעה מאוחרת"	"Late Seven Day Mourning"	Rosen Family	January 24, 2012
Riki sits in mourning about her mother's death. Everyone comes for her. Special guest star: Dov Glikman as Shlomo Pinkus Guest stars from the Hasson family: Yehoram Gaon as Silvan Hasson, Yona Elian as Rachel Hasson, Yamit Sol as Orna Katz, Ami Smolartchik as Moshe Katz, Kobi Marziano as Manny Hasson, Tamara Klingon as Alin Hasson, Edna Blilious as Meyrav Hasson

=== Season 2 (2013–14) ===
No. overall	No. in season	Title (Hebrew)	Title (English)	Family	Original air date
43	1	"לוטו"	"Lotto"	Both Families	March 26, 2013
Shay and Shani come to the Hassons' house and see the Lotto winners on the TV. Everyone thinks that they are Shay's parents. Shay and Shani go to the Rosens' house, to check it. Guest star: Hili Yalon as Adam's date
44	2	"פוני"	"Bangs"	Rosen Family	March 26, 2013
Riki and Pinchas take Shay and Shani's girls from school, and Riki takes the girls to a hairdressing salon, and cuts their bangs. Shani gets angry when she discovers this. Guest star: Ina Bekelman as Lihi, Adam's date and the girls' sport teacher
45	3	"שישו ושמחו"	"Joy and Rejoice"	Both Families	April 2, 2013
Shay and Shani celebrate their little girl's birthday at a gymboree. All the families are invited. Shay wants to go back to his performance, but Shani has invited Oded Paz. Special guest star: Oded Paz as himself
46	4	"חגיגה בסנוקר"	"Celebration at Snooker"	Hasson Family	April 2, 2013
Meyrav leaves the house, and Silvan puts a snooker table in her room. Rachel misses Meyrav.
47	5	"שוגון"	"Sugon"	Rosen Family	April 9, 2013
Pinchas falls on his head, and now he thinks that he is the famous detective Sugon.
48	6	"קפה"	"Coffee"	Hasson Family	April 9, 2013
Silvan gets a coffee machine and tries to make a lot of different coffees. Meyrav dates the coffee salesman.
49	7	"42.2"	"42.2"	Hasson Family	April 16, 2013
Moshe wants to run in a marathon race, and all the family come to support. Guest stars: Kobi Faraj as Aharon, Moshe's brother
50	8	"סבתא חנה"	"Grandma Hannah"	Rosen Family	April 23, 2013
Gandma Hannah's last will and testament is discovered after year of her death. She left for anyone a mission. Guest star: Eli Drai as the lawyer
51	9	"שיפוצים"	"Renovation"	Hasson Family	April 23, 2013
Shay and Shani get stuck in the Hassons' house because they have a renovation. The renovation continues over and over again. Guest stars: Arie Tzarner as the renovator, Shmulik Cohen as the renovator's son
52	10	"אמא אוי אמא"	"Oh Mama Mama"	Rosen Family	April 30, 2013
Riki tells everyone to take care of the plants at five o'clock. Adam brings a date who acts like Riki. Guest star: Nali Tagar as Adam's date Guest stars from the Hasson Family: Yehoram Gaon as Silvan Hasson
53	11	"תומס אדיסון כץ"	"Thomas Edison Katz"	Hasson Family	April 30, 2013
Moshe sells a startup to the French people for millions of euro. Everyone asks him about the money.
54	12	"אפרת"	"Efrat"	Hasson Family	June 7, 2013
Efrat comes to visit and she talks with Orna. However, her words are taken out of context. Special guest star: Yamit Sol as Efrat Hasson Note: Yamit Sol acts as two characters in this episode, Orna and Efrat.
55	13	"האוטו שלנו"	"Our Car"	Hasson Family	August 5, 2013
Pinchas sells his car to Silvan. Everyone suspects that it will work. Guest stars from the Rosen Family: Tuvia Tzafir as Pinchas Rosen, Sandra Sade as Riki Rosen
56	14	"מטרופקה"	"Craziness"	Rosen Family	August 12, 2013
Shay tries to escape from his boss' dinner. Adam brings a date that actually is okay. Guest star: Yael Grobglas as Adam's date the Craziness
57	15	"אמי הגנרלית"	"Mother General"	Rosen Family	August 12, 2013
Shay is in army reserve. The family comes to visit, and Riki gets inside the HQ. Guest stars: Deddy Zohar as the commander, Eyal Nachmias as the general
58	16	"אחד באפריל"	"April Fools"	Hasson Family	August 19, 2013
April Fools is here and the Hasson family tricks everyone, especially Moshe.
59	17	"בגידות"	"Treasons"	Rosen Family	August 19, 2013
Riki catches Pinchas looking too close at Spencer Tunick's photo, and everyone sees that Michal is there. Guest stars: Adi Rozentzvik as Mifras Adam's date, Yael Grobglas as the Craziness
60	18	"דברים שרציתי לומר"	"Things That I Wanted To Say"	Hasson Family	August 26, 2013
Manny's band come to visit the Hassons. Meyrav cries about her ex-boyfriend.
61	19	"שבוע לפני הלידה"	"A Week Before The Childbirth"	Rosen Family	August 26, 2013
Shani is extremely angry, and everyone tries to relax her.
62	20	"סרט לידה"	"The Childbirth Movie"	Hasson Family	September 16, 2013
The Hasson family finds Shani's childbirth movie and they watch it. Guest stars from the Rosen Family: Tuvia Tzafir as Pinchas Rosen, Sandra Sade as Riki Rosen
63	21	"לבקר עם כוכבים"	"Visiting with the Stars"	Both Families	September 16, 2013
Everyone visits Shani. Hilla Nachshon has given birth too and she waits for a taxi in Shani's room. Special guest star: Hilla Nachshon as herself
64	22	"לפני שנה"	"Year Ago"	Hasson Family	September 23, 2013
A year before, Meyrav received a prophecy to get married. Will she find a bridegroom? Guest stars from the Rosen Family: Liat Har Lev as Michal Rosen
65	23	"שלוש ושליש"	"Three and one-third"	Rosen Family	September 23, 2013
The baby comes for the first time to the Rossens' house. Adam's date is Maya Rubin from the series Shalosh (three). Special guest star: Maya Rubin as herself
66	24	"די.אן.איי"	"D.N.A"	Rosen Family	November 4, 2013
Riki thinks that Shay is not the baby's father and asks him to do a DNA test.
67	25	"חלומות"	"Dreams"	Hasson Family	November 4, 2013
Everyone dreams about what happened at Friday dinner. Each one has his own version.
68	26	"רחל אמנו"	"Our Mother Rachel"	Hasson Family	November 11, 2013
Shay and Shani want to decide whether to do the Zeved habat to the baby or not. Orna and Moshe don't know how to do the Bat Mitzvah for her daughter Shantel. Silvan has not what to wear and Meyrav dumped. Rachel needs to solve all the problems.
69	27	"אוכל"	"Food"	Rosen Family	November 11, 2013
Pinchas has invited a French chef to cook the Friday dinner. Guest stars: Avigail Armon Levi as the French chef, Yam Shamir as Adam's date
70	28	"הקרב על הועד"	"The Battle Of The House Committee"	Hasson Family	November 18, 2013
Silvan is the nominee to be the mayor of the house committee. Meyrav suspects Moshe betrayed Orna.
71	29	"אחות שלו"	"His Sister"	Rosen Family	November 18, 2013
Pinchas' sister comes to visit after 30 years of fighting. The family wants to know why there was a fight. Special guest star: Rivka Gur as Tova Ya'acovson, Pinchas' sister
72	30	"ארוחה כפולה"	"Double Dinner"	Both Families	December 29, 2013
Silvan celebrates his birthday when Funny from the club finally comes to the Rossens' house. Shay and Shani have to be in the two houses. Guest stars: Aviva Marks as Funny from the club, Liraz Charhi as Canarit Adam's date
73	31	"חשיפה לדרום"	"Southern exposure"	Hasson Family	December 29, 2013
The parents go on a vacation in the Dead Sea and Meyrav teaches an art class in the house.
74	32	"להמר בגדול"	"Big Gamble"	Hasson Family	May 16, 2014
Everyone does a diet competition and gambles about it.
75	33	"משה כן משה לא"	"Moshe Yes Moshe No"	Rosen Family	May 23, 2014
Ricky and Shani argue about how to put the baby, on her side or on her back. Moshe gives Shani ointment to apply on the baby. Guest stars from the Hasson Family: Ami Smolartchik as Moshe Katz
76	34	"רומיאו ויוליה"	"Romeo and Juliet"	Both Families	May 30, 2014
Shay and Shani tell their girls the story of Romeo and Juliet. Shay is Romeo and Shani is Juliet. Special guest star: Haim Ausdon as Uncle Haim
77	35	"יום שישי ה-13"	"Friday the 13th"	Rosen Family	June 6, 2014
Friday dinner at the Rossens' house is on Friday 13th. There is bad luck for everyone. Guest star: Noa Wolman as Adam's date
78	36	"עגלה"	"Perambulator"	Hasson Family	June 20, 2014
Silvan takes the baby on a trip in her perambulator by he backs with another baby.
79	37	"החבר'ה ואני"	"The Friends and Me"	Rosen Family	June 27, 2014
Riki and Pinchas invite their friends. The family wants to know why. Guest stars: Manny Pe'er and Nira Revinovitz as Riki and Pinchas' friends.
80	38	"יוצאים לטיול"	"Go to a Trip"	Both Families	July 4, 2014
Shay and Shani compare with which family is harder to go on a trip.
81	39	"שווה בשווה בשווה"	"Equally"	Rosen Family	July 11, 2014
Riki and Pinchas write their last will and testament. Shay, Itamar and Adam realise that their parents won't stay forever. Guest stars from the Hasson Family: Yehoram Gaon as Silvan Hasson, Yona Elian as Rachel Hasson, Edna Blilious as Meyrav Hasson
82	40	"בריתת מצווה"	"Zeved Mitzva"	Both Families	September 19, 2014
There is a big celebration, the baby's Zeved HaBat and Shantel's Bat Mitzvah. All the families are invited. Note: The episode was scheduled to air on July 16, 2014 but because of the Operation Protective Edge 2014, it was postponed to September 19, 2014.

=== Season 3 (2016) ===
No. overall	No. in season	Title (Hebrew)	Title (English)	Family	Original air date
83	1	"פרסונה נון גרטה, חלק א"	"Persona Non Grata, Part 1"	Rosen Family	March 11, 2016
Itamer has divorced Michal. Silvan arrives at the Rosen house because he thinks that his wife has a courtly love. Adam has a girlfriend of a few months and he tries to prove that he won't break up with her. At the end of the episode Shani plans an emergency meeting at the Hasson house. Guest star: Sassi Keshet as Yakov (Kobi), Silvan and Rachel's neighbor Guest stars from the Hasson Family: Yehoram Gaon as Silvan Hasson, Yona Elian as Rachel Hasson, Yamit Sol as Orna Katz, Kobi Marziano as Manny Hasson, Ami Smolartchik as Moshe Katz, Tamara Klingon as Alin Hasson, Edna Blilious as Meyrav Hasson
84	2	"פרסונה נון גרטה, חלק ב"	"Persona Non Grata, Part 2"	Hasson Family	March 18, 2016
The Hasson family tries to convince Silvan to come back home. Guest star: Sassi Keshet as Kobi and Rachel's lovers Guest stars from the Rosen Family: Tuvia Tzafir as Pinchas Rosen, Sandra Sade as Riki Rosen, Yaniv Polishuk as Itamar Rosen
85	3	"אמא'שך"	"Your Mom"	Rosen Family	March 25, 2016
Because Itamer has divorced Michal, he goes to live with Riki and Pinchas. Riki doesn't like it so she doesn't want to make the Friday dinner which includes schnitzels, so Sapir volunteers to make it.
86	4	"הפונדק"	"The Hostel"	Hasson Family	March 25, 2016
Meyrav volunteers to make the Friday dinner at the Hasson house. Rachel tries fixing her cooking because Meytav doesn't know how to cook well. The other family members go to the restaurant "The Hostel" because they know that Meyrav is cooking.
87	5	"קרנית"	"Cornea"	Rosen Family	April 1, 2016
Shani has a party at her boss's place. Itamar's date, named Karnit (cornea) wakes up before the dinner where everybody waits for the meal. In the end, Shay and Shani find out that Karnit is Shani's boss's daughter. Guest star: Lirit Balaban as Karnit
88	6	"בין שני הרים"	"Between Two Mountains"	Both Families	April 1, 2016
Shay and Shani eat Friday dinner at Riki's, where Riki and Sapir tell Shani about Botulinum toxin. Then Shani's mother calls and tells her that Efrat has come from Los Angeles with her husband Mike and she has gotten breast implants. Everybody who is in the Hasson family comes to see. In the end, Efrat says that she has come to Israel because her implants were too big. Guest stars: Yamit Sol as Efrat Hasson, Iftach Ofir as Mike Note: Yamit Sol acts as two characters in this episode, Orna and Efrat.
89	7	"הבוררת"	"The Arbitrator"	Rosen Family	April 8, 2016
Sapir finds out that Itamar's date is from a crime family. Shani tells her about a problem with a neighbor, and after that, the neighbor's car explodes. In the end, it turns out it was a mistake and she isn't from a crime family. Guest star: Tal Levi as Itamar's date
90	8	"מקסיקני קירח"	"Mexican Bold"	Hasson Family	April 8, 2016
Shai runs over something when he parks his car. He finds out that he ran over Lawyer Mandel's Mexican bulldog which is rare. Lawyer Mandel wants a lot of money in compensation. Finally, Lawyer Mandel's daughter finds the dog. Apparently, Shai ran over a rat. Guest star: Dor Tzoigenbom as Lawyer Mandel
91	9	"ליל הסדר חלק א"	"Passover Seder, Part 1"	Rosen Family	April 15, 2016
Three months before the Passover Seder, the Rosen family talk about who is going where. Riki wants a small dinner but there is no place to the Hasson family to celebrate the Passover Seder. Finally, Riki invites all the Hasson family and Sapir's parents. Guest stars from the Hasson Family: Yehoram Gaon as Silvan Hasson, Yona Elian as Rachel Hasson, Yamit Sol as Orna Katz, Ami Smolartchik as Moshe Katz, Tamara Klingon as Alin Hasson, Edna Blilious as Meyrav Hasson
92	10	"ליל הסדר חלק ב"	"Passover Seder, Part 2"	Both Families	April 15, 2016
Riki and Pinchas invite the Rosen and Hasson families to the Passover Seder. Moshe brings a special karpas but Riki puts it in the salad. Sapir's parents are late, and when they come, they fix a power outage.
93	11	"ויצ'ואה"	"Vichoa"	Rosen Family	April 30, 2016
Itamar's first ex-wife, Smadar, comes to the Rosen Family.
94	12	"שלוש ארבע לעבודה"	"Three Four to Work"	Hasson Family	April 30, 2016
The Hasson Family searches for a job for Meyrav behind her back.
95	13	"המשואה"	"The Torch"	Both Families	May 6, 2016
Silvan has been chosen to light a torch at the Yom Ha'atzmaut's eve. Itamar wakes up at Meyrav's room.
96	14	"ארוחת ערב"	"Dinner"	Rosen Family	May 6, 2016
All Riki's food is brown, and there is a fight in the family.
97	15	"מיהו יהודי"	"Who is a Jew"	Hasson Family	May 13, 2016
Shay's daughter starts believing in God, Meyrav has a date and Silvan thinks about NOP 38. Guest stars: Yuval Segal as Yoel, Yossi Segal as Shtynitz
98	16	"מזל טוב"	"Mazel tov"	Rosen Family	May 13, 2016
Itamar celebrates his birthday after he has left the parents' house.
99	17	"נזדרוביה"	"Nasdrovia"	Hasson Family	May 14, 2016
Alin films a television pilot for a new Russian show, Nasdrovia. The Hasson family, Riki, Pinchas and Dudu Aharon are invited. Special guest star: Dudu Aharon as himself Guest stars from the Rosen Family: Tuvia Tzafir as Pinchas Rosen, Sandra Sade as Riki Rosen
100	18	"מבחנים"	"Tests"	Rosen Family	May 14, 2016
Shay and Shani test Riki by telling her that they are going to divorce. Riki tests Sapir like the tests she has made to Shani.
101	19	"בת מצווש"	"Bat Mitzvah"	Hasson Family	May 20, 2016
Efrat celebrates her daughter's Bat Mitzvah in Jerusalem with the family. Guest stars: Yamit Sol as Efrat Hasson Note: Yamit Sol acts as two characters in this episode, Orna and Efrat.
102	20	"שיפוץ"	"Renovation"	Rosen Family	May 20, 2016
Itamr wants to renovate his child's room, and Shay and Pinchas play tennis in the country.
103	21	"ילד להשכיר"	"A Kid for Rent"	Hasson Family	May 27, 2016
104	22	"שם המשחק"	"The Name of the Game"	Rosen Family	May 27, 2016
105	23	"הפורמט"	"The Format"	Hasson Family	June 3, 2016
106	24	"ערב התרמה"	"Donation Night"	Rosen Family	June 3, 2016
107	25	"נהיגה מונעת"	"Preventive Driving"	Hasson Family	June 10, 2016
108	26	"מריימלה"	"Miriyamale"	Rosen Family	June 10, 2016
109	27	"מבצע ד"	"Operation D"	Hasson Family	June 17, 2016
110	28	"שריפה, אחים, שריפה"	"s’brent! briderlekh, s’brent!"	Both Families	June 17, 2016
111	29	"אינטרפוץ בפרצלציה"	"Mischbatterie in Parceling"	Hasson Family	June 24, 2016
112	30	"השכן הוולקני"	"The Volcanic Neighbor"	Rosen Family	June 24, 2016
113	31	"יום כיפור"	"Yom Kippur"	Hasson Family	July 1, 2016
114	32	"חתונת הפורמייקה"	"The Formica Wedding"	Rosen Family	July 8, 2016
115	33	"אינסטושי"	"Instushi"	Both Families	July 15, 2016
116	34	"שבדניצה הקטנה"	"Little Świdnica"	Rosen Family	July 15, 2016
117	35	"דיקור"	"Acupuncture"	Hasson Family	July 22, 2016
118	36	"פילפל מיטר"	"Pepper Meter"	Rosen Family	July 22, 2016
119	37	"התערבות"	"Intervention"	Both Families	July 29, 2016
120	38	"הרוגי מלכות"	"Martyrs"	Rosen Family	July 29, 2016
121	39	"רילוקיישן"	"Relocation"	Rosen Family	August 5, 2016
It is the last dinner at the Rosen house before Shay's relocation to the United States.
122	40	"פיניקס, אריזונה"	"Phoenix, Arizona"	Hasson Family	August 5, 2016
It is the last Saturday at the Hasson house before Shay and Shani move to Phoenix, Arizona. Who will get their apartment?

=== Season 4 (2017–18) ===
No. overall	No. in season	Title (Hebrew)	Title (English)	Family	Original air date
123	1	"'החזרה, חלק א"	"The Return, Part 1"	Both Families	November 3, 2017
Rachel, Orna and Adam take back from the airport Shay and Shani who went back to Israel after relocation to Phoenix, Arizona. They tell them what happened in the families when they were gone.
124	2	"'החזרה, חלק ב"	"The Return, Part 2"	Both Families	November 3, 2017
The both families reunite at the Rosen house.
125	3	"הירושה"	"The Inheritance"	Hasson Family	November 10, 2017
After the russian health minister death in season 1 he leaves money to Manny and Alin, everybody is nicer to them. Guest stars from the Rosen Family: Yaniv Polishuk as Itamar Rosen, Sandra Sade as Riki Rosen, Tuvia Tzafir as Pinchas Rosen.
126	4	"על החיים ועל המוות"	"About Life and Death"	Rosen Family	November 10, 2017
Riki and Pinchas are tempted to buy burial plots in a new and exclusive tower.
127	5	"הבבא סאלי"	"Baba Sali"	Hasson Family	November 17, 2017
Silvan guesses all the soccer games results. He is about to break the record of Ful the Octopus.
128	6	"החריף"	"The Spicy"	Rosen Family	November 17, 2017
Shay tries to sneak Shani's spicy stew into the Rosen house, he is caught and the dinner is blown up. At the same time, Liri is distributing samples of new cream from the THOR company.
129	7	"טעימות"	"Tastings"	Hasson Family	November 24, 2017
Meyrav, Aharon, Rachel and Silvan went on a tour of the wedding halls for "tasting", and Meyrav is considering regrets.
130	8	"הזקנה במסדרון"	"The Old Woman in the Hallway"	Rosen Family	November 24, 2017
During a visit to the hospital, Riki is mistakenly considered an "old woman in the hallway" in the news item about the Ministry of Health's failures, and then in the evening her death is announced. Guest stars from the Hasson Family: Yona Elian as Rachel Hasson, Yehoram Gaon as Silvan Hasson.
131	9	"בריידזילה"	"Bridezilla"	Hasson Family	December 1, 2017
With the Hasson ladies, Meyrav gets ready for the wedding.
132	10	"המשקיע"	"The Investor"	Rosen Family	December 1, 2017
Liri and Itamar invite a Chinese investor and his interpreter for Friday dinner at the Rosen house.
133	11	"הפנחסיאדה"	"The Pinchasiada"	Rosen Family	December 8, 2017
Shani organizes a surprise birthday party for Pinchas in 2 hours.
134	12	"ריקוד מושחת"	"Dirty Dancing"	Hasson Family	December 8, 2017
The Hasson family takes dance lessons for Meyrav's wedding.
135	13	"חג המחזמר"	"The Musical Holiday"	Both Families	December 15, 2017
Shay and Shani try to prove to their girls that they can write a musical better than all the garbage musicals and Festigal plays of Hanukkah.
136	14	"סרט חתונה"	"Wedding Movie"	Hasson Family	December 22, 2017
Shai and Shani try to make Meyrav's wedding movie. Guest stars: Eden Ben Zaken, Riki Gal, Kobi Machat, Tal Mosseri and Oded Paz as themselves.
137	15	"הבן של"	"The Son Of"	Rosen Family	December 29, 2017
Shai and Shani's daughter has lice. Liri's son visits Israel and fights with Itamar.
138	16	"יואל"	"Yoel"	Hasson Family	January 5, 2018
Yoel comes back and wants to marry Meyrav. Guest star: Yuval Segel as Yoel.
139	17	"לו הייתי פיראט"	"If I Were a Pirate"	Rosen Family	January 12, 2018
The Rosen family goes to an escape room. Sapir thinks about breaking up with Adam. Guest stars from the Hasson Family: Yona Elian as Rachel Hasson, Yehoram Gaon as Silvan Hasson.
140	18	"החלום ושברו"	"The Dream Broke"	Hasson Family	January 19, 2018
Silvan was hospitalized for appendicitis. As he recovers from anesthesia, he is "stuck" in a dream about another reality. Meanwhile, Riki is babysitting Shay and Shani's girls. Guest star: Noam Shenhav as a nurse. Guest stars from the Rosen Family: Sandra Sade as Riki Rosen, Tuvia Tzafir as Pinchas Rosen, Tom Avni as Adam Rosen, Yarden Bracha as Sapir Cohen.
141	19	"בדרך לחתונה עוצרים בפ"ת"	"The Petah Tikva Hangover"	Hasson Family	January 26, 2018
Parody of The Hangover: After Aharon's crazy Bachelor Party in Eilat, all the celebrants find themselves scattered all over the country.
142	20	"חתונה מאוחר מדי"	"A Too Late Wedding"	Both families	February 2, 2018
Aaron and Meirav's wedding is about to begin, Manny is trying to finish writing the best friend's speech and everyone is throwing ideas and stories from their past with Meirav.
143	21	"הכספת"	"The Safe"	Both families	February 9, 2018
The entire Rosen family is investigating Shai and Shani and is trying to find out if the Hasson family knows how much they wrote with checks. The contents of the safe were stolen at the end of the wedding.
144	22	"רעיון נולד"	"An Idea Is Born"	Hasson Family	February 16, 2018
The Hasson family watched the promo for a new game "Idea is Born" and both Shay and Moshe joined the competition.
145	23	"רדיו קלאסיק"	"Radio Classic"	Rosen Family	February 23, 2018
Riki invited the violist Canarit, Adam's ex-date, to participate in a radio show by Pinchas, who is currently engaged in Grieg's work "Peer Gynt". Guest star: Liraz Charhi as Canarit.
146	24	"מסיבת תחפושות"	"Costume Party"	Rosen Family	March 2, 2018
At the family Purim party Ricky reveals the truth behind her costume.
147	25	"טיול שנתי"	"Annual Trip"	Hasson Family	March 9, 2018
All of them came back from vacations around the world except Shay and Shani who had to hear stories. Silvan and Rachel installed a semi-smart house system.
148	26	"מתוק מתוק"	"Sweet Sweet"	Rosen Family	March 16, 2018
Shay received an invitation from two couples to the restaurant "Sweat Sweat" and Shani invited Adam and Sapir. Itamar was forced to return to the parents who were hosting Vera and Marcel. Guest stars: Miki Kam as Vera, Poly Reshef as Marcel.
149	27	"עוכרי דין"	"Law abusers"	Hasson Family	March 23, 2018
Lawyer Mendel from the penthouse and his daughter help the Hasson family prevent Aaron from being a protected tenant and Shay and Shani with the suit of their neighbor Zusko. Guest stars: Dor Tzoigenbom as Lawyer Mandel, Lia Duenyas as Mandel's daughter.
150	28	"סליק"	"Stash"	Rosen Family	April 13, 2018
Shai tries to connect with Shani who is in his parents' home after he went to the Hasson family and finds that the house is blocked because of the evacuation of a stash by the sabotage unit.
151	29	"כסף של שבת"	"Sabbath Money"	Hasson Family	April 20, 2018
A video that Shani uploaded to the network, whose participants are Manny and Moshe, becomes viral. They argue over who should receive the royalties.
152	30	"שי צו"	"Shizu"	Rosen Family	April 27, 2018
Liri received a precious dog for signing a contract with an Indian company. Sapir and Adam have to set a wedding date.
153	31	"גוונים של רחל 50"	"50 Shades of Rachel"	Hasson Family	May 4, 2018
The Hassons find an erotic memoir in Rachel's closet. In the living room, they try to install a very smart, dumb box.
154	32	"בא לבשל"	"Came to Cook"	Hasson Family	May 11, 2018
Yisrael Aharoni comes to shoot a new program in Rachel's kitchen. Shay has a chance to win at the field in Shvednica in the lottery. Guest stars: Yisrael Aharoni as himself, Ruby Duenyas as director. Guest stars from the Rosen Family: Sandra Sade as Riki Rosen, Yaniv Polishuk as Itamar Rosen.
155	33	"נקודות למחשבה"	"Points for Thinking"	Rosen Family	May 18, 2018
Riki has new neighbors doing remodeling and noise. Pinchas spies after them and discovers that the new buyer is a judge.
156	34	"בויעדם"	"Mezzanine"	Hasson Family	May 25, 2018
As part of the cleaning of the mezzanine in the Hasson house, Shani reveals a list from the age of 18 of things she should be able to do before the age of 40. Will she make peace?
157	35	"טוקטה ופוגה"	"Toccata and Fugue"	Rosen Family	June 1, 2018
Itamar and Liri are hiding in Pinchas' radio station, Riki needs to ask the granddaughters to accompany her in a fashion show and Adam discovers that someone is watching the house.
158	36	"יום העצמאות"	"Independence Day"	Hasson Family	June 8, 2018
This year Riki and Pinchas are celebrating Independence Day in the park with the Hasson family. After Silvan was injured in the leg the celebrations moves to the Hasson house. Guest stars from the Rosen Family: Sandra Sade as Riki Rosen, Tuvia Tzafir as Pinchas Rosen.
159	37	"ג'אז"	"Jazz"	Rosen Family	June 15, 2018
It's the time to tell everyone how Sapir and Adam met. Shay and Shani try to do it in the cleanest way possible.
160	38	"ארבעים"	"Forty"	Hasson Family	June 22, 2018
Shani has her fortieth birthday. Shay needs to choose between a surprise party and dinner at a recommended kosher restaurant for her.
161	39	"כעבור 10 שנים, חלק א'"	"Ten Years Later, Part 1"	Both families	June 29, 2018
Ten years later, Shay and Shani's pregnant daughter gets married but regrets at the last moment. Itamar married Smadar but Liri releases from prison and does not know about it.
162	40	"כעבור 10 שנים, חלק ב'"	"Ten Years Later, Part 2"	Both families	July 13, 2018
Continuation of the plot in the previous episode.

=== Season 5 (2018-19) ===
No. overall	No. in season	Title (Hebrew)	Title (English)	Family	Original air date
163	1	"'חתונה קטנה, חלק א"	"A Little Wedding, Part 1"	Both families	December 14, 2018
Sapir and Adam get married at a boarding house in the north and everyone comes to the wedding, even those who were not supposed to.
164	2	"'חתונה קטנה, חלק ב"	"A Little Wedding, Part 2"	Both families	December 14, 2018
Continuation of the plot in the previous episode.
165	3	"'קידום, חלק א"	"Promotion, Part 1"	Hasson Family	December 21, 2018
Silvan plays backgammon against Yaakov the neighbor, Shay's phone does not recognize his face and Shani received a promotion at work.
166	4	"'קידום, חלק ב"	"Promotion, Part 2"	Rosen Family	December 21, 2018
Shay can not deal with Shani's promotion, Sapir can not deal with Riki and Liri can not deal with the legal system.
167	5	"די לגיבוש"	"Stop the Formation"	Both families	December 28, 2018
Shai and Shani travel to Eilat for a weekend to a formation of the new level of management in Shani's new work and the girls move from grandmother to grandmother.
168	6	"ל"ג בעומר"	"Lag BaOmer"	Rosen Family	January 4, 2019
Everyone's children make bonfires in the only area allocated by the municipality which is 50 meters from the house of Ricky and Pinchas and today the maid cleaned the home.
169	7	"ארץ עיר פרבר"	"Country City Suburb"	Hasson Family	January 11, 2019
Shani can not get back in time from work to the Kiddush while in the Hasson's living room a lively Scattergories game of: countries, cities, organisms, inanimates and ethnic dishes is being developed.
170	8	"תירוצים"	"Excuses"	Rosen Family	January 18, 2019
Everyone makes excuses for their absence from the opening of Liri's trial and the seven-day swearing of Sapir's grandmother and then the excuses mix.
171	9	"אף מילה לאפרת"	"Don't Tell Efrat"	Hasson Family	January 25, 2019
Efrat arrives in Israel under a veil of secrecy only Shani who picks her up from the airport knows. Of course everyone is trying to guess why she and Mike separated. Special guest star: Yamit Sol as Efrat Hasson. Note: Yamit Sol acts as two characters in this episode, Orna and Efrat.
172	10	"סטורי"	"Story"	Rosen Family	February 1, 2019
Riki and Pinchas fought and everyone feels it, something happened between Pinchas and Liri the night before and everyone shares Sapir's story.
