= To soi sou =

- Genre: Comedy
- Based on: Savri Maranan; Your Family or Mine
- Written by: Apostolis Tsaousoglou; Nikos Mitsas; Giorgos Hliopoulos; Dimitra Tsolka; Antonis Andris; Gogo Fotou; Elpida Grilla; Vivi Nikolopoulou; Giannis Diakakis; Elena Solomou; Annita kouli Dimitra Poulkou; Katerina Mpei; Zoi Koivari; Giorgos Kokouvas; Charalampos Mpourazanis
- Directed by: Nikos Zapatinas; Giorgos Siougas; Antreas Morfonios; Antonis Aggelopoulos; Stamatis Patronis
- Starring: Mirka Papakonstantinou; Pavlos Orkopoulos; Renia Louizidou; Giorgos Giannopoulos; Vaso Laskaraki; Meletis Hlias; Alexandros Mpourdoumis; Ioanna Asimakopoulou; Sofia Panagou; Giannis Drakopoulos; Efthimis Zisakis; Vivian Kontomari; Solon Tsounis; Gogo Kartsana
- Theme music composer: Vasilis Panagiotopoulos
- Opening theme: Mallia kouvaria
- Country of origin: Greece
- Original language: Greek
- No. of seasons: 7

Production
- Producer: Kostas Sousoulas
- Production locations: Athens, Greece
- Camera setup: Multi-camera
- Running time: 32-52 minutes
- Production companies: Plus Productions (seasons 1-4); Green Pixel Productions (season 5); JK Productions Καραγιάννης(season 6)

Original release
- Network: Alpha TV
- Release: October 23, 2014

To soi sou is the title of a Greek comedy television series produced during 2014-2019 and 2025-2027, based on the American series Your Family or Mine, which in turn is based on the Israeli series Savri Maranan. In Greece, it was broadcast by the television station Alpha TV, while in Cyprus by Alpha TV Cyprus.

The series premiered on October 23, 2014, and was renewed for a second season in April 2015. The second season premiered on October 1, 2015, with the four episodes of the first being postponed, while the new episodes of the second season began airing on October 15. Due to its success in the ratings, the series was renewed for a third season in July 2016, and in May 2017 it was renewed for a fourth season. In May 2018, the series was renewed for a fifth season. In May 2019, it was announced that the series had not been renewed for a sixth season.

The final episode of the series aired on June 25, 2019, The premiere of Season 6 took place on October 31, 2025, while the 6th season concluded with 70 episodes on October 27, 2026 , The premiere of Season 7 took place on November 2, 2026.

== Series overview ==
Season	Episodes	Originally aired	
Season	Episodes	First aired	Last aired
1	52	October 23, 2014	June 23, 2015
1	52	October 1, 2015	October 9, 2015
2	66	October 15, 2015	July 7, 2016
3	66	October 5, 2016	June 29, 2017
4	62	October 5, 2017	June 26, 2018
5	61	October 1, 2018	June 25, 2019
6	70	October 31, 2025	July 9, 2026
6	70	September 21, 2026	27 October 2026
7		2 November 2026	2027

== Plot ==
This is a Greek comedy television production that focuses on the relationships and differences of two families, the Hampeas and the Triantaphyllou, who are united through the marriage of Lydia and Savvas. Although they love the couple, their different habits, perceptions and ways of thinking lead them to constant misunderstandings and comical situations, mainly during family gatherings. Focusing on Sunday dinners, the story highlights the conflicts, blunders and funny moments that arise, humorously depicting Greek family life and the importance of bonds that, despite disagreements, remain strong.

== Cast ==
Triantaphyllou family
Actor	Role	Note
Mirka Papakonstantinou	Alexandra Triantaphyllou	wife of Menelaos, mother of Savvas, Konstantinos and Aris, mother-in-law of Lydia and Antonia, grandmother of Sandra, Chara, Menios and Spyros. She loves sculpture, which she does professionally. Her particular hobby is her humor, which she practices in her entire environment, but with her two daughters-in-law as her main target. She could be described as critical, ironic, cold, distant and selfish, however, she takes care to hide her sensitivity and love for her family.
Pavlos Orkopoulos	Menelaos Triantaphyllou	husband of Alexandra, father of Savvas, Konstantinos and Aris, father-in-law of Lydia and Antonia, grandfather of Sandra, Chara, Menios and Spyros. He is a renowned neurosurgeon and runs his own clinic. He loves his family, he loves his daughters-in-law, unlike Alexandra, who is hostile to them. He has a mild character, is gentle and accommodating, which often leads him to play the role of peacemaker in quarrels between family members. Sometimes he shows naivety towards Alexandra's various "tricks", whose antics often anger him, but he always forgives her in the end because he loves her. He is calm and fair, and he proves this in every disagreement that occurs at their Sunday dinner tables.
Meletis Hlias	Savvas Triantaphyllou	husband of Lydia, father of Sandra and Chara. He is a bank employee, formal and responsible, but he has various phobias, little appetite for activities and is always worried about the family's expenses. Although he says he is a thrifty person, Lydia calls him stingy, which often annoys her with this characteristic of his. They have excellent relations with Lydia's family.
Alexandros Mpourdoumis	Konstantinos Triantaphyllou	husband of Antonia, father of Menios and Spyros. He has studied pharmacy and has opened his own pharmacy with his second wife, Antonia. He has a son from his first marriage to Vera, Menios. With Antonia, they tried to have their own child, but when they saw that it was not possible, they applied to adopt a baby. At the end of the series, their application was accepted and they managed to adopt a little boy, whom they named Spyros. Konstantinos, although he loves both his parents, has a weakness for his mother Alexandra, to whom he justifies everything while he loves her cooking, something that the rest of the family detests. He is anxious and prone to panic, slightly sickophobic and often naive.
Ioanna Asimakopoulou	Antonia Tsiridou	wife of Konstantinos, mother of Spyros, stepmother of Menios. After unsuccessful attempts to have her own child, they adopt a little boy whom they named Spyros. She works with Konstantinos at his pharmacy, where they met. She is kind and helpful, but also insecure, prone to panic and somewhat naive, as a result of which she regularly receives the irony of her mother-in-law, Alexandra. She vents her insecurity and embarrassment through food, and although she always tries to follow a proper diet, she does not succeed. She believes deeply in God and often invokes Saint Raphael.
Efthimis Zisakis	Aris Triantaphyllou	He has studied medicine and is doing his specialization in neurosurgery, following in the footsteps of Menelaos and with the aim of one day taking over the family clinic. As the youngest son of the family, he is his mother's weakness. He does not like to commit, loves to have fun and is often unruly, but at the same time is honorable and down to earth. He does not want to get married and have a family, but there are many times when he has brought various girls with whom he had a relationship to the Sunday table. During the fourth season, he decides to join Doctors Without Borders and leaves for Africa.

Hampeas family
Actor	Role	Note
Renia Louizidou	Charoula Hampea	wife of Vangelis, mother of Bella, Lydia, Olga, Mariza and Dionisis, mother-in-law of Savvas, Michalis and Alina, grandmother of Sandra, Chara, Eirini and Vangelis. She is a housewife and is strict and protective of her family, whom she loves. Using her intelligence, she manages to guide Vangelis in various situations, making him make the decisions she wants, making him believe that they are his. She loves cooking and is proud of her recipes.
Giorgos Giannopoulos	Vangelis Hampeas	husband of Charoula, father of Bella, Lydia, Olga, Mariza and Dionisis, father-in-law of Savvas, Michalis and Alina, grandfather of Sandra, Chara, Eirini and Vangelis. He comes from a village in Messina, to which he often refers through stories from his childhood. He is a self-made businessman and owns his own chain of butcher shops. A man of old principles, a gourmet and strong-willed, he imposes himself as the head of the family, without realizing that in difficult situations it is Charoula who guides him to make "his" decisions. Although strong-willed, he remains kind-hearted and devoted to his wife and family. He loves all his children and his son-in-law Savvas. He is constantly at odds with his son-in-law Michalis since he has been unemployed for a long time, as a result of which his daughter Olga bears the entire burden of the family. Despite their quarrels and disagreements, she loves him and tries to help him by hiring him in the shops he owns. At the end of the series, before moving with Charoula to Thessaloniki, he hands over the butcher shop chain to Michalis, telling him that he is the only one he trusts for such a thing.
Vaso Laskaraki	Lydia Hampea	wife of Savvas, mother of Sandra and Chara. She works at the social grocery store of the municipality of Aigaleo. Is a quite strict with the children, unlike Savvas. She does not have the best relationship with her mother-in-law, Alexandra, and although the two are constantly at odds, deep down there is love between them, compared to Antonia, who constantly antagonizes her for everything. Every Sunday, together with Savvas, they gather for dinner either at her parents' house or at her husband's father's house. Towards the end of the series, she receives an offer to work as a manager at a children's hostel in Thessaloniki and, although she finds it difficult at first, eventually with Savvas' encouragement she accepts the offer. Savvas is transferred to Thessaloniki and the family moves to the capital.
Sofia Panagou	Olga Hampea	twin sister of Mariza, wife of Michalis, mother of Eirini. She loves her husband very much and, unlike her family, considers him very capable and active, which results in minor frictions and disagreements between herself and the rest of the Habeas family. She is an unspecified philologist and in the fourth season of the series, she applies for a substitute position at the border and leaves for Nevrokopi, despite the objections of her family. In the fifth season, she is again a substitute, this time in Messina. At the end of the series, she confides in Lydia that she is tired of being away from her family and next year she intends to accept a position only in Athens, so that she can be close to her husband and daughter.
Sofia Panagou	Mariza Hampea	twin sister of Olga. She works in Germany, specifically in Berlin, where she works as a scientist in a pharmaceutical company. She is unruly, loud, does not take care of herself and is single. Her family believes that she is the same as Vangelis. In the fifth season, Mariza decides to move forward seriously with her partner, Friedrich, who was loved and loved by the Hampeas family very much.
Vivian Kontomari	Βella Hampea	She is the eldest daughter of the family and single and works in one of her father's butcher shops. She harbors insecurities, is a procrastinator and has not managed to settle down as to what she wants from life. In the fourth season she decides to leave the butcher shop and become a writer, something she successfully achieves and soon publishes her first book. With this, she has now settled on what she wants in terms of her professional life and, although initially her family is against the idea of writing, they eventually accept it and support her decision. In the fifth season they make her a proposal to transfer one of her stories to television and to take on the script herself. Because of this proposal, she meets Takis, who is her editor, and the two become a couple. In the last episode she moves into her parents' house with him, since her parents have moved to Thessaloniki.
Solon Tsounis	Dionisis Hampeas	husband of Alina, father of Vangelis. He is the only son of the Ηampeas family, he has a completely different lifestyle from the rest of the family and has a bond with Alina. He is a radio producer, which irritates his father since he would like him to take over the family business, while he is also busy with farming on a small field that his father bought for him. He is a vegetarian, ecologist and environmentalist. Although against marriage, and at the end he proposes to Alina, which she accepts. However, the two of them break up when Alina leaves for a program in India and he cannot follow her due to the service he must serve in the army. However, at the end of the fourth season Alina returns, announcing to him that she is expecting his child, the result of a brief reunion they had a short time ago, and they decide to get married, while in the fifth season they welcome their son, whom they name Vangelis.
Giannis Drakopoulos	Michalis Mpismpikis	husband of Olga, father of Eirini. He closed his business due to debt and since then he has been trying to find a managerial position in a company, so that he can have a salary without working too hard. He considers himself capable and very intelligent and although lazy, which causes reactions from his father-in-law, he is kind-hearted and loves his family. He takes on various jobs along the way, while when Olga leaves for Nevrokopi, he gets a job at Vangelis' butcher shop. At the end of the series, Vangelis gives him the chain of butcher shops, after he moves to Thessaloniki.
Gogo Kartsana	Alina Manolaki	wife of Dionisis, mother of Vangelis. Ιs a yoga teacher and Dionysis' girlfriend. Like him, Alina is a vegetarian and an environmentalist. She is against anything conventional, while she loves Dionysis' family, feelings which are mutual. Although she is initially against the idea of marriage, when Dionysis proposes to her and she accepts it. However, Alina leaves for a program in India where Dionysis cannot follow her due to his military service, and a month later she breaks up with him via Skype. At the end of the fourth season, she returns to announce to Dionysis that she is expecting his child, the result of a brief reunion they had a while ago, and they decide to get married, while a little later they welcome their son, whom they name Vangelis.

Children participating
Actor	Role	Season
Maria Aikaterini Kolla	Sandra Triantaphyllou	1
Vasia Golfinopoulou	Sandra Triantaphyllou	2-7
Ioanna Papadopoulou	Chara Triantaphyllou	1
Hliana Galani	Chara Triantaphyllou	2-7
Dimitris Presvias	Menios Triantaphyllou	1
Konstantinos Chrysomallidis	Menios Triantaphyllou	2-5
Anastasis Kougias	Menios Triantaphyllou	6-7
Lydia Vasiliki Savva	Eirini Mpismpiki	1
Maritina Alafogianni	Eirini Mpismpiki	2-4
Dimitra Georgakopoulou	Eirini Mpismpiki	5-6
Panagiotis Grammatsoulias	Vangelis Hampeas (junior)	5
Sotiris Odysseus	Vangelis Hampeas (junior)	6-7
Serafeim Katsimitros	Spyros Triantaphyllou	5
Angelos Kammas	Spyros Triantaphyllou	6-7
Dimitris Lagoutis	Nasos	6-7
