= Liraz Charhi =

Israeli actress, singer and dancer

Liraz Charhi לירז צ'רכי
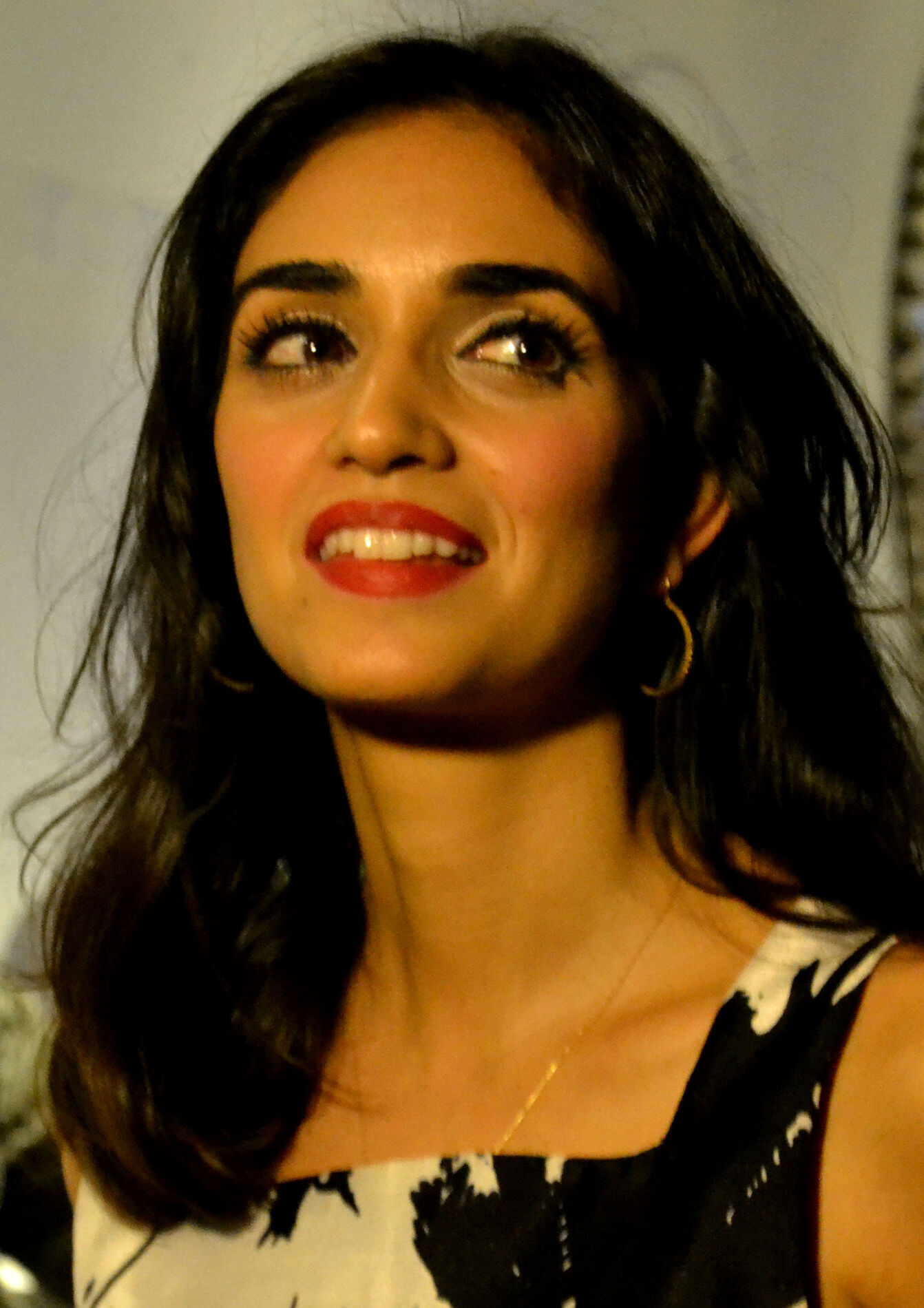
- Liraz Charhi in 2015

Background information
- Born: Ramla, Israel
- Origin: Iran, Israel
- Genres: Israeli Hebrew music, Iranian music
- Occupations: Singer, actress
- Instrument: Vocals
- Years active: 2004–present
- Spouses: Ziv "Kojo" Cojocaru (divorced); Tom Avni (divorced)

Liraz Charhi (Hebrew: לירז צ'רכי) is an Iranian-Israeli actress, singer, and dancer. She is the niece of Iranian-born Israeli singer Rita.

She was nominated for an Ophir Award for her role in the 2004 film Turn Left at the End of the World, and acted in the films Fair Game (2010) and A Late Quartet (2012). In 2020, she played an Israeli Mossad agent in the Israeli spy thriller television series Tehran.

She has released six studio albums, singing in both Hebrew and Persian.

== Early life and education ==
Liraz Charhi was born in Ramla, Israel, to an Iranian Jewish family.

Charhi began singing and performing at the age of 6, and made her debut as stage actress at the Habima National Theatre, where she worked professionally from age 11 to 14; then she studied at the Beit Zvi Stage Arts School.

As a singer, she has released six studio albums, singing in both Hebrew and Persian.

== Career ==
=== 2002–19 ===
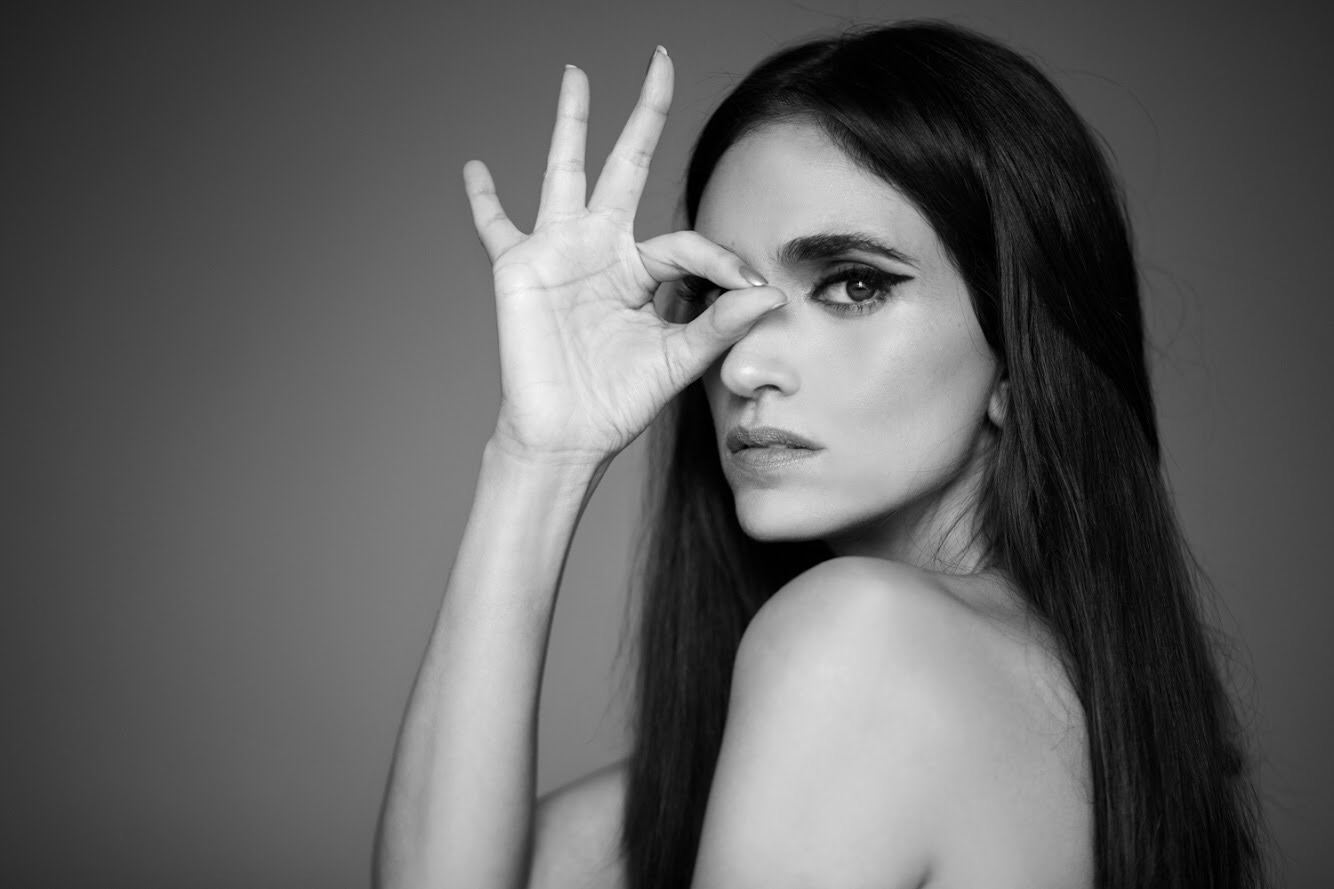
Charhi in 2017 in Paris

Charhi appeared in the Israeli TV series Ha-Masa'it in 2002, and gained further attention after a nomination by the Israeli Film Academy (Ophir Award) for her role in the 2004 film Turn Left at the End of the World (Sof Ha'Olam Smola). She was invited to the Israel Film Festival in Los Angeles in 2006, and afterwards started pursuing a career in Hollywood.

Charhi has since become known for her roles in the French mini TV series Revivre, and the films Fair Game (2010) and A Late Quartet (2012) in which she played the jogger and flamenco dancing girlfriend of Philip Seymour Hoffman.

As a singer she has released the singles "Od Tzohorayim" and "Al Tafsik" which have been played on radio in Israel. Charhi's first album sung in Persian, Naz, was released in 2018.

=== 2020–present ===
In November 2020, Charhi's second Persian album, titled Zan (meaning "woman"), was released on Glitterbeat Records in collaboration with Raman Loveworld and some other Iranian artists. Some artists collaborated anonymously, and some have joined the project publicly, despite the risks involved in collaborating with an Israeli artist. The first release from the album was "Injah".

In 2020, she played Yael Kadosh, an Israeli Mossad agent in the Israeli spy thriller television series Tehran (Hebrew: טהרן), written by Zonder and Omri Shenhar and directed by Daniel Syrkin. The series is about the Iran–Israel proxy conflict; it premiered in Israel on 22 June 2020 and on 25 September 2020 internationally on Apple TV+.

In 2023, she was offered a role in Roland Emmerich's historical drama series, Those About to Die. She ultimately had to turn the role down due to tour commitments with her music career.

In June 2025, Charhi said that her international music career had faced setbacks since the October 7 attacks. Three days after the attacks, most of her planned UK concerts were cancelled. Her London-based record label delayed the release of her sixth studio album and asked her to take a pro-Palestine political stance on social media. Charhi subsequently moved to another label.

She was a songwriter for the 2025 film Reading Lolita in Tehran, directed by Eran Riklis and based on the Iranian memoir of the same name by Azar Nafisi. She also stars in the 2025 Nickelodeon adventure series Quest.

== Personal life ==
She is the niece of Iranian-born Israeli singer Rita.

Charhi was married to Israeli composer and conductor Ziv "Kojo" Cojocaru from 2004 to 2010. She married Israeli actor Tom Avni, and they have two daughters.

== Discography ==
=== Albums ===
- Naz (2018)
- Zan (November 2020)
- Roya (October 7, 2022)

=== EPs ===
- Enerjy - انرژی (May 17, 2024)

=== Songs / videos ===
- Zan Bezan (2019)
- Injah (2020)
- Bia Bia (2020)

== Filmography ==
Year	Title	Role	Notes
2004	Turn Left at the End of the World	Sarah Talkar	
2010	Fair Game	Dr. Zahraa	
2011-2013	Sabri Maranan	Canarit, Adam's date	2 episodes
2012	A Late Quartet	Pilar	
2015-2018	Where Do You Live? (Eifo Ata Hai?)	Margo Shem Tov	Main role
2018	Acre Dreams	Ronit	
2020	Tehran	Yael Kadosh	Main role
2025	Quest	Liza	13 episodes
TBA	The Rental 2	Agent Berenice	Upcoming sequel

== See also ==
- List of Iranian women actresses
