= Cojocaru =

Cojocaru is a common Romanian surname that refers to one who makes the cojoc jacket, a traditional Romanian garment made of sheepskin. Notable people with the surname include:

- Alina Cojocaru, Romanian ballet dancer
- Alina Carmen Cojocaru, mathematician
- Cristieana Cojocaru, Romanian athlete
- Doina Cojocaru, Romanian handball player
- Ido Kozikaro, Israeli basketball player
- Mara-Daria Cojocaru (born 1980), German poet and philosopher
- Maxim Cojocaru, Moldovan footballer
- Ovidiu Cojocaru, Romanian rugby footballer
- Sabina Cojocar, Romanian gymnast
- Steven Cojocaru, Canadian fashion critic
- Valentin Cojocaru, Romanian football player
- Ziv Cojocaru, Israeli classical musician

it may also refer to:

- Cojocaru River in Romania
- Cojocaru, a village in Mogoșani Commune, Dâmboviţa County, Romania

== See also ==
- Cojoc
