= Asimakopoulou =

Asimakopoulou is a Greek surname. Notable people with the surname include:

- Anna-Misel Asimakopoulou (born 1967), Greek politician and lawyer
- Beata Asimakopoulou (1932–2009), Greek actress
- Elena Asimakopoulou (fl. 2000s), first runner-up in 2006 Miss Star Hellas competition
- Ioanna Asimakopoulou (born 1984), Greek actress
