= Breakin' All the Rules =

- Theatrical release poster
- Directed by: Daniel Taplitz
- Written by: Daniel Taplitz
- Produced by: Lisa Tornell
- Starring: Jamie Foxx; Morris Chestnut; Jennifer Esposito; Peter MacNicol; Gabrielle Union
- Cinematography: David Hennings
- Edited by: Robert Frazen
- Music by: Marcus Miller
- Production company: Screen Gems
- Distributed by: Sony Pictures Releasing
- Release date: May 14, 2004
- Running time: 105 minutes
- Country: United States
- Language: English
- Budget: $10 million
- Box office: $12.5 million

Breakin' All the Rules is a 2004 American romantic comedy film directed and written by Daniel Taplitz. It stars Jamie Foxx, Morris Chestnut, Jennifer Esposito, Peter MacNicol and Gabrielle Union. The film's plot involves a self-help author being asked to talk to his cousin's girlfriend, but falls in love with her through mistaken identity and farcical situations.

Breakin' All the Rules was released in the United States on May 14, 2004 by Screen Gems, which was also the film's production company. The film garnered negative reviews from critics and grossed $12.5 million worldwide.

== Plot ==
Quincy Watson is unceremoniously dumped by his fiancée Helen Sharp during their engagement party. Devastated, he attempts to express his feelings to her with a heartfelt letter. His boss, Phillip Gascon, has also given him the job of researching how to diplomatically lay off people at their company. As Quincy writes, the letter becomes a "how to" book on the correct way to end a relationship. He has a book published and becomes a best-selling author on the subject. Not wanting his male friends to suffer the same fate, he gives them advice on dumping their mates including Philip, who is trying to break up with his gold-digger girlfriend Rita Monroe. After his cousin Evan Fields reads Quincy's book he starts to question his relationship with his girlfriend Nicky Callas.

Mistakenly believing that Nicky wants to break up with him, Evan goes to his cousin Quincy and asks him to talk to her, hopefully convincing her that Evan's a good guy. Since Quincy has never met her, he does not know what she looks like so Evan tells him that she has long, black hair. (As it turns out, that day, Nicky had cut her hair to a short length she described as being like Halle Berry). Quincy and Nicky end up sitting next to each other at the bar where Nicky was supposed to meet Evan. Quincy tells her that he is looking for his cousin's ex-girlfriend Nicky who has long black hair.

Knowing that Quincy is Evan's cousin, Nicky lies and tells Quincy her name is Mary. During the time Quincy and Nicky are at the bar, Rita finds out that Philip is planning to break up with her. She goes to Quincy's house but when she gets there Evan lies and says that he's Quincy. The two begin an affair. Later, Evan goes to Nicky's house to break up with her, only to find that she was going to do the same, and has been seeing another man.

Changing his mind, Evan tells Quincy that he thinks he is in love with Nicky, and that she has been seeing another man. During that conversation, Quincy realizes that 'Mary' is actually Nicky. At the party for Quincy's hot seller book, Helen is just back from Paris and has decided she wants to get back with Quincy. Evan had planned on proposing to Nicky at the party but finds out that Quincy is dating his ex-girlfriend. He becomes upset with him and leaves the party to look for Nicky. The next day, Evan talks to Quincy and tells him he will marry Rita. Philip had a heart attack, and at the hospital, Rita finds out that Evan lied to her. Instead of getting mad, she says she fell in love with him. Quincy breaks up with Helen and goes to look for Nicky. When he goes to her door, her neighbor tells him that she's leaving for Portland by train. He goes to look for her. As the train is speeding away he confesses his love for her and they both ride the train to Portland.

== Cast ==
- Jamie Foxx as Quincy Watson
- Peter MacNicol as Philip Gascon
- Morris Chestnut as Evan Fields
- Gabrielle Union as Nicky Callas
- Jennifer Esposito as Rita Monroe
- Bianca Lawson as Helen Sharp
- Jill Ritchie as Amy
- Danny Comden as Sam
- Heather Headley as Herself

== Reception ==
Breakin' All the Rules was received negatively by critics. 32% of critics on Rotten Tomatoes gave the film a positive review; the consensus reading: "This formulaic screwball comedy is weighed down by a contrived, overly complicated plot." Metacritic, which uses a weighted average, assigned the film a score of 46 out of 100, based on 26 critics, indicating "mixed or average" reviews.

Roger Ebert felt the film works based on the performances by Foxx, Chestnut and Union being "funny and pleasant" throughout the runtime, saying it's "not a comic masterpiece, but it's entertaining and efficient, and provides a showcase for its stars. It's on the level of a good sitcom." Variety's Joe Leydon commended Taplitz for maintaining "a degree of Feydeau-like complexity" while directing the various contrivances at a "pleasingly brisk clip" with "genuinely witty" dialogue. He also praised Foxx and Union for displaying "frisky playfulness and comic consternation" and "impressive range and star presence" in their respective roles, saying the film "manages to amuse as a cleverly concocted hybrid of conventional romantic comedy and mistaken-identity farce." Stephen Holden of The New York Times felt the film's "throwaway charm" was achieved by the cast delivering an "urbane style" to their roles and Taplitz giving them an "aerobically stimulating pace" to display their performances.

Mike Clark of USA Today was positive towards Foxx's performance and Taplitz being able to "juggle the subplots he's given", concluding that: "Designed to be a date movie, Rules could have stronger male appeal than many comedies of its ilk." Ty Burr of The Boston Globe was critical of the film's plot holes, scuzzy cinematography, and succumbing to "strained farce and cheap yuks" in the second half, but gave praise to Taplitz for providing "tart, affectionate back-and-forth banter" to his cast, highlighting Foxx and Union's scenes having charm and heat to them, concluding that: "As date-night piffle goes, though, it's thoroughly engaging. If "Breakin' All the Rules" will be gone from the cultural memory banks within six weeks, it keeps you smiling for the 85 minutes it's on the screen." Mark Caro of the Chicago Tribune criticized MacNicol and Esposito's one-note characters and the broad slapstick throughout the film, but commended Taplitz for providing "glimpses of intelligence" with "sharp dialogue" and clever plot constructs, and the performances by Foxx, Union and Chestnut, saying: ""Breakin' All the Rules" isn't exactly a good movie, but it turns out not to be bad, either. It's a romantic comedy that strains to be screwball but at least is likable."

Jennie Punter of The Globe and Mail critiqued that the plot was "only slightly more complex than your average episode of Friends" with its "annoying running gags" but gave praise to Foxx for giving "comedic physical presence and intelligence" to his "cookie-cutter good-guy" role, saying: "Breakin' All the Rules delivers the goods in formulaic fashion, but enjoys an edge thanks to a fast-paced story and, more importantly, the casting of Foxx as the romantic lead." Entertainment Weekly's Owen Gleiberman gave the film a 'C+' grade, saying: "[T]he rules of good screenwriting are mostly broken, though Jamie Foxx's smash-and-grab charisma remains intact." Ed Gonzalez of Slant Magazine wrote: "Predicated on an endless (and I do mean endless) string of misunderstandings, Breakin' All the Rules is rom-com warfare so reductive as to suggest it was written during a Three's Company marathon." Carla Meyer of the San Francisco Chronicle commended Foxx's portrayal of Quincy, but felt he was above the film's material and has "little chemistry" with his two main leads. He also criticized Taplitz's filmmaking, saying he "piles on the convolutions in an overripe comedy of sitcom stock characters and bad jokes."

The film opened at number 5 in its opening weekend at the box office, ultimately grossing $12,544,254 worldwide.

== Awards and nominations ==
Foxx was nominated for a Black Reel Award for Best Actor, Comedy or Musical for his work in the film, losing to Bernie Mac for Mr. 3000. Union was nominated for a Black Reel Award for Best Actress, Comedy or Musical and an NAACP Image Award for Outstanding Actress in a Motion Picture for her work in the film, but they both went to Irma P. Hall for The Ladykillers and Kerry Washington for Ray respectively.
