= Pretty Persuasion =

2005 film by Marcos Siega

- Theatrical release poster
- Directed by: Marcos Siega
- Written by: Skander Halim
- Produced by: Marcos Siega; Matt Weaver; Todd Dagres; Carl Levin
- Starring: Evan Rachel Wood; Ron Livingston; James Woods; Jane Krakowski; Elisabeth Harnois; Danny Comden; Michael Hitchcock; Adi Schnall
- Cinematography: Ramsey Nickell
- Edited by: Nicholas Erasmus
- Music by: Gilad Benamram
- Production companies: Ren-Mar Studios; Prospect Pictures
- Distributed by: Samuel Goldwyn Films; Roadside Attractions
- Release dates: January 22, 2005 (Sundance Film Festival); August 12, 2005 (U.S.)
- Running time: 109 minutes
- Country: United States
- Language: English
- Budget: $2.5 million
- Box office: $537,100

Pretty Persuasion is a 2005 American black comedy film directed by Marcos Siega, written by Skander Halim, and starring Evan Rachel Wood, James Woods, Ron Livingston, Elisabeth Harnois, and Jane Krakowski. Its plot follows a manipulative, sociopathic 15-year-old student at an elite Beverly Hills academy who accuses her drama teacher of sexual harassment.

== Plot ==
Kimberly Joyce is a precocious, narcissistic, sociopathic high school student at Roxbury Academy, an elite preparatory school in Beverly Hills. She and her best friend Brittany take Randa, a new Muslim student who recently emigrated from the Middle East, under their wing. Kimberly's home life is troubled; her bigoted and disaffected father Hank, an electronics executive, shows little interest in her life, while her vapid stepmother, Kathy, constantly attempts to reprimand her for her coarse language and attitude. Kimberly dreams of becoming an actress, and obtains a coveted role as Anne Frank in the school play.

The school drama teacher, Percy Anderson, orders Kimberly and Randa to after-school detention one day for disrupting class, and forces Kimberly to write an essay reflecting on her transgression. Percy takes the essay home that evening and has his wife, Grace, read it aloud provocatively as a role play before the two engage in sex. After Brittany is publicly humiliated by Percy during an acting exercise, Kimberly devises a plan to accuse him of sexually harassing each of them. Unable to afford an attorney, Percy agrees to his friend Roger—a clueless high school law teacher who passed the bar —acting as his attorney. In court, Roger proposes that the accusations are in retaliation to Kimberly having been replaced in the school play after referring to her Jewish classmate Josh's lawyer father as a "money-grubbing shyster."

The case becomes a media sensation covered extensively by Emily Klein, a local lesbian reporter. Shortly after the trial begins, Kimberly has a sexual encounter with Emily. Kimberly then manipulates Josh with oral sex into convincing his father Larry, a renowned defense attorney, to defend Percy pro bono. When Larry cross examines Brittany, she confesses on the stand that she, Kimberly, and Randa fabricated the accusations. When Emily confronts her outside the courthouse, Kimberly reveals she filmed their sexual encounter, and uses it as blackmail to receive favorable press coverage.

Overwhelmed with the shame brought on her family by the false accusations, Randa shoots herself dead at school. Grace, now aware the essay Percy had her read was written by Kimberly, leaves him. In the storm of media coverage, Emily extolls Kimberly as a mere "victim" of society, and the ensuing press incites Hollywood producers to give Kimberly a bit part on a daytime soap opera.

When Brittany visits Kimberly at her house, Kimberly reveals she manipulated Josh into having his father defend Percy as she knew it would cause Brittany to buckle under pressure in court. When Brittany asks why, Kimberly explains that she devised the calculated plot to garner publicity for herself, as well as exact revenge against Brittany for having stolen her ex-boyfriend, Troy. Brittany lambasts her and leaves, vowing never to speak to her again. Kimberly turns on the television and sees herself on the episode of the soap opera. Switching through channels, she watches snippets of an interview with a school shooter and news footage of Randa's suicide before returning to the soap opera. As she watches herself onscreen, tears begin streaming down her face.

== Cast ==
- Evan Rachel Wood as Kimberly Joyce
- James Woods as Hank Joyce
- Ron Livingston as Percy Anderson
- Elisabeth Harnois as Brittany
- Adi Schnall as Randa
- Stark Sands as Troy
- Jane Krakowski as Emily Klein
- Michael Hitchcock as Headmaster Charles Meyer
- Danny Comden as Roger Nicholl
- Jaime King as Kathy Joyce
- Josh Zuckerman as Josh Horowitz
- James Snyder as David "Dave"
- Cody McMains as Kenny
- Selma Blair as Grace Anderson
- Clyde Kusatsu as Judge Carl Munro
- Robert Joy as Larry Horowitz
- Octavia Spencer as Woman

== Themes ==
The plot primarily focuses on sexual harassment accusations within a school system, as well as the repercussions of one 15-year-old girl's actions. But the film also makes commentary on many other social issues in contemporary American culture as well, many of them being controversial. Some of the topics that are commented on include racism, ignorance, discrimination, gender identity, homosexuality, intolerance, immigration, teenage behavior, suicide, parenting, deceit, narcissism and fascination with celebrity status and the entertainment industry.

Director Marcos Siega, commenting on the film's thematic message, said: "At the end of the film there isn’t one overriding message I am trying to convey. I want the audience to walk away with their own opinions of what they have seen and their own feelings intact. The reality is that there are a lot of things wrong with our society and this film deals with some of those frustrations. I expect people’s reactions to be varied, and my only hope is that they walk away talking about it."

== Production ==
=== Development ===
Screenwriter Skander Halim developed the story based on a news article he read about an eighth-grade girl in his hometown of Ottawa, Ontario who accused her teacher of molesting her. After moving to Los Angeles and reading scripts for production companies several years later, Halim wrote the screenplay for the film, setting it in Beverly Hills. "It struck me that this was the perfect setting for that story," he said. "I wrote it as The Script That Could Never Get Made, and I was shocked when it did."

=== Casting ===
Evan Rachel Wood was the first to be cast in the film as the lead character of Kimberly Joyce. After Wood's casting, James Woods signed on to play her character's father, followed by Ron Livingston as the teacher that her character accuses of sexual harassment.

=== Music ===
The musical score was composed by Gilad Benamram. The film deliberately does not feature any popular music songs. Similarly, the wardrobe and props do not feature contemporary branding.

== Release ==
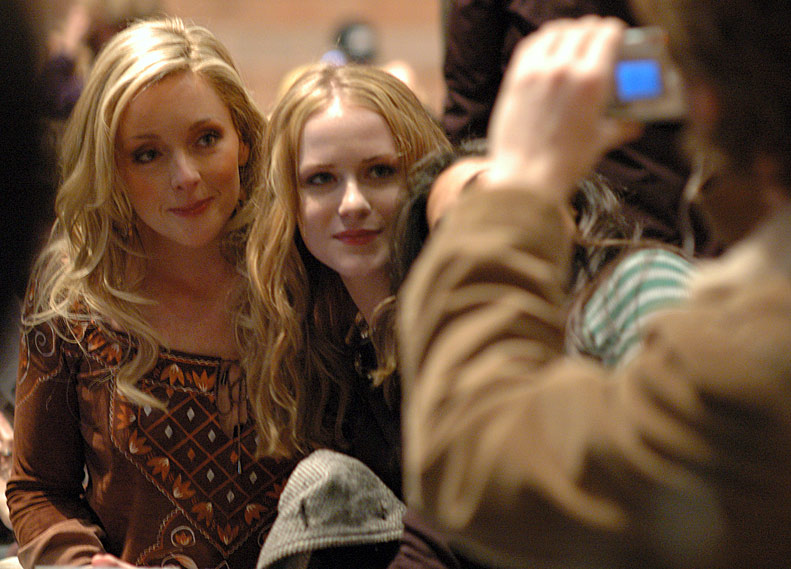
Krakowski and Wood pictured at the film's 2005 Sundance Film Festival premiere

Pretty Persuasion premiered at the Sundance Film Festival on January 22, 2005. The film was given a limited theatrical release in the United States on August 12, 2005.

=== Critical response ===
Roger Ebert called Pretty Persuasion "daring, and well-acted", but also said that it "exists uneasily somewhere between comedy and satire." Phil Villarreal of the Arizona Daily Star called the film a "scathing and hilarious social satire." While Stephen Holden of The New York Times praised the film: "An obscene, misanthropic go-for-broke satire, "Pretty Persuasion" is so gleefully nasty that the fact that it was even made and released is astonishing. Much of it is also extremely funny. Any satire worth its salt should not be afraid to offend, and "Pretty Persuasion" flings mud in all directions with a fearless audacity." James Mottram of Channel 4 opined, "Hovering uncomfortably between comedy and satire, Pretty Persuasion never quite gets the balance right." Carlo Cavagna thought it a "dark teen comedy that tries way too hard to be a dark teen comedy."

The Seattle Post-Intelligencer accused the film of being an "ugly, cheap attempt at satire", and Slant magazine called it "a pretty unpersuasive lecture". Adam Vary of The Advocate called the film "rife with political incorrectness." Critic Armond White deemed the film "ingenious."

The film has a "rotten" 33% approval rating on internet review aggregator Rotten Tomatoes based on 79 reviews, with an average rating of 5/10. The site's consensus reads: "Pretty Persuasion aims for high satire but falls short of poignancy by depending on too much black humor, with too little redeeming humanity to provide balance".

=== Accolades ===
- The film was nominated for the 2005 Grand Jury Prize at the Sundance Film Festival.
- It won the German Independence Award (Audience Award) at the 2005 Oldenburg International Film Festival.

=== Home media ===
Sony Pictures Home Entertainment released Pretty Persuasion on DVD on December 13, 2005.
