= Sol Goode =

2003 film by Danny Comden

- Theatrical release poster
- Directed by: Danny Comden
- Written by: Danny Comden
- Produced by: Vincent Newman; Tucker Tooley; Happy Walters; Matt Weaver
- Starring: Balthazar Getty; Katharine Towne; Jamie Kennedy; Danny Comden; Cheri Oteri
- Cinematography: Christopher Walling
- Edited by: Christopher Koefoed
- Music by: Mike Einziger
- Production companies: After the Edge Films; Immortal Entertainment
- Distributed by: Lionsgate Home Entertainment
- Release date: 2003
- Running time: 99 minutes
- Country: United States
- Language: English

Sol Goode is a 2003 American romantic comedy film written and directed by Danny Comden. The lead role of Sol Goode is played by Balthazar Getty; other cast include Katharine Towne, Jamie Kennedy, Danny Comden, and Cheri Oteri. The film features cameo appearances including Jared Leto, Carmen Electra, Jason Bateman, and Shannon Leto.

== Plot ==
Sol Goode is an unemployed aspiring actor living in Los Angeles. Approaching thirty, Sol seeks acting roles in Hollywood while spending much of his time partying and dating. He lives in a bungalow with his roommate, Justin. His social circle consists of Justin, Cooper, Happy, Sol's visiting cousin, and Chloe, a waitress and college student.

After a one night stand with Tammie, a "low end" girl in the social scene, Sol realizes he has run out of money to pay his share of the rent, and Justin has to reprimand him for not having a job and the possibility that he will have to grow up. Sol's situation is further compounded when visiting his parents, who give him a "sit down", confronting him about his lack of responsibility, all while refusing to issue him rent money. At work, Justin is singled out for a promotion from mail room duty, to become the assistant of the bossy and snappy female Hollywood agent Bernie "Best", and his off hours are devoted to his controlling and manipulative fiancee, Brenda.

One day, Happy comes into town to see Sol, stating that his time off is thanks to him and his lover taking time off from their relationship, something that Sol refers to as "a hall pass". When Happy comes along with Sol for an audition, Sol's agent proceeds to hire Happy for a Levi Jeans commercial and drops Sol behind his back. At the end of his rope with this turn of events, his rent due and eviction nearing, and his car being towed away, Sol again turns to trying to pull a one night stand to ease his frustrations, but is forced to hitch with Tammy when no other options are available. Meanwhile, Justin is forced to perform demeaning and menial tasks as Bernie's assistant and endure the brunt of her abuse, from picking up the feces of Bernie's dog, being the receiving end of her verbal abuse, forced to run incredibly petty errands for her, and put into high pressure jobs that test his patience. During a day out with his friends, Brenda reveals she wants Justin to move in with her, and issues a reluctant Justin the ultimatum of choosing time with his friends or her.

The morning after, Tammy confronts Sol about how she is called for nothing but sex between them, and implores and coerces Sol into taking her out on a date. Hoping to take her out to a restaurant in the San Fernando Valley to avoid being seen with her in public, and with his car impounded, Sol is driven by Tammy on their night out, and his plans are dashed when Tammy is to work as a Red Bull promoter at a live MTV event before their date and is caught by one of the girls he knows out on the road. The date turns out to be a very awkward affair that ends with Tammy being the one wanting to engage in a purely sexual relationship with Sol, and perturbed, Sol ditches her when she awaits for him in the women's bathroom. During a night out afterwards, Sol sees Chloe share drinks with Happy on a date, while Justin gets drunk and engages with a fling with an old acquaintance, both of them discussing Brenda's notorious reputation. The next day, Sol confronts Happy about Chloe, whom the latter can tell that Sol has deeper feelings for, while Justin is caught in bed by Brenda. Unable to state anything but how the fling "just naturally happened", Brenda bitterly breaks off the engagement, which Justin indifferently lets pass on.

With the awkward date shaking him up and getting to realize how unstable things are, Sol attempts to get his life in order. He applies for numerous jobs at a placement center, from golf range tender, paperboy, and even out of his agent's "mercy", a sewage maintenance worker, but none are anything he can stand or be competent in. Sol then invites Chloe to their hangout spot, and confesses how they are both everything they are looking for in love, but despite him realizing the signs this time around, Chloe's reception is mixed due to his initial boundaries that she is just to strictly be "a friend" and how she is still in a relationship with Happy, leaving their future together uncertain. Justin meanwhile gains the confidence to stand up to Bernie, which has her reveal that her tempestuous attitude and demeaning tasks were meant to test him to see if he had what it took to be an agent, which he passed. Despite being offered another promotion, Justin actually quits, having had enough of the corporate world's hazing and cruel workplace antics.

The next day, Justin reveals to Sol that he's back to his old self again and that they will still be roommates in the times to come. Sol then receives a letter from Happy, who lets Sol know that he's returning back home for good and thanks him for his hospitality, leaving him a check to pay off the rent.

Giving in to his parents' well meaning discretion, Sol takes up the family tradition of being an umpire as his day job. After successfully overseeing a youth softball game, his parents proudly pass down to him the Goode family heirloom, a golden cup protector, as proof of his maturity. Soon after, Chloe also appears on the field, and embraces Sol on the pitcher's mound. The next day, the two are in bed, but to Sol's surprise Chloe must go to work, despite it being her day off. Questioning if he's been subject to his own means of post coital removal for his one night stands, Chloe comes back into the room, revealing that she was just teasing him.

== Cast ==
- Balthazar Getty as Sol Goode
- Katharine Towne as Chloe
- Jamie Kennedy as Justin Sax
- Danny Comden as Cooper
- Natasha Gregson Wagner as Brenda
- Cheri Oteri as Bernie "Best"
- Tori Spelling as Tammie
- Johnathon Schaech as "Happy"
- Robert Wagner as Sol's Dad
- Christina Pickles as Sol's Mom
- Jason Bateman as "Spider"
- Max Perlich as Murphy
- Michael Hitchcock as Job Placement Officer

The film features cameo appearances including Jared Leto, Carmen Electra, Shannon Leto and Christina Applegate (uncredited).

== Production and release ==
The movie was originally written in 1997. Filming occurred over a 22 day period in Los Angeles, California. Because of the tight schedule, scenes were shot largely out of sequence. The score of the film was composed by guitarist Mike Einziger, of the band Incubus.

In the United States, the film was distributed on home video by Lionsgate Home Entertainment. The film also received an Australian Region 4 DVD release, which was distributed by Universal Pictures Home Entertainment rather than Lionsgate.

== Reception ==
Sol Goode was met with a mixed response upon its release, with many critics praising its cast. Vince Leo of Qwipster wrote "Sol Goode gets a recommendation as a romantic comedy, and should especially appeal to those who enjoy films about dating in LA and the wanna-be's in the Hollywood scene." He praised Comden's performance and those of rest of the cast, stating "Danny Comden, who plays Cooper in the film, also served as the film's writer and director, and for the most part, he impresses in every department. There are good performances by the hip young cast, knowing insights which bubble up throughout the story, and a good sense for the proper tone for each scene, blending in the soundtrack well." Emily Blunt of Blunt Review, Inc. wrote a similar review, stating that "the cast does a fantastic job of just enjoying the material supplied by screenwriter Danny Comden, (who also has a pivotal role in the film). There's no surprises or unforeseen twists that'll leave you mesmerized, but still it's a purrfect cuddle up with a big bowl of popcorn piece." Scott Phillips of Monstersatplay.com praised the cast and wrote "While Sol Goode definitely wears its adoration for John Hughes movies on its sleeve, the flick is really more akin to stuff like Swingers and even Free Enterprise."

TV Guide's review states that, "the game young cast helps freshen writer-director Danny Comden's tale of immature slackers with too much testosterone and too little discipline." They observe that, "though a capable actor, Balthazar Getty lacks the sleazy charisma to play a womanizer." Gregory Avery of Nitrateonline commented that, "the subplot involving Justin and Brenda turns out to be one of the best things in Sol Goode, which, to its credit, tries to expand to accommodate a number of plot threads and characters in order to give the film more scope and substance."
