= Turn Left at the End of the World =

- סוף העולם שמאלה
- Directed by: Avi Nesher
- Written by: Sara Ezer; Avi Nesher; Ruby Porat Shoval
- Produced by: Samuel Hadida; Avi Nesher; Mickey Rabinowitz
- Starring: Netta Garti; Liraz Charhi
- Cinematography: David Gurfinkel
- Edited by: Marie-Pierre Renaud
- Music by: Krishna Levy
- Production company: Davis-Films
- Distributed by: Metro Communications (Israel); Metropolitan Filmexport (France)
- Release date: 24 March 2004
- Running time: 110 minutes
- Country: Israel
- Languages: Hebrew; French; English; Hindi; Judeo-Moroccan Arabic

Turn Left at the End of the World (Hebrew: סוף העולם שמאלה, Sof HaOlam Smola) is a 2004 Israeli comedy drama film written, produced and directed by Avi Nesher and starring Netta Garti and Liraz Charhi.

It was the first film that Nesher made in Israel since Rage and Glory (1984) as he had made films in Hollywood in the intervening years.

The film was a major commercial success in Israel and has since come to be regarded as a classic in the pantheon of Israeli cinema.

== Plot ==
The film takes place in a small Negev development town in 1968 and narrates the culture war of Moroccan and Indian olim, focusing on the relationship between two girls, Sarah Talkar and Nicole Shushan.

== Cast ==
- Netta Garti: Nicole Shushan
- Rotem Abuhav:Jossy, Nicole's sister
- Jean Benguigui: Isaac Shushan, Nicole's father
- Ruby Porat-Shoval: Jeannette Shushan, Nicole's mother
- Liraz Charhi: Sarah Talkar
- Kruttika Desai: Rachel Talkar
- Parmeet Sethi: Roger Talkar
- Aure Atika: Simone Toledano

== Production ==
Outdoor scenes were filmed in Midreshet Ben-Gurion.

== Reception ==
The film participated in international film festivals in the United States, Australia, India and European countries, and received several awards, including the Audience Award at the festival Taormina Film Fest and the Jury Prize at the Tokyo International Film Festival. In Israel, it won two Ophir Awards for Best Art Direction and Costume Design. It was also nominated for Best Actress, (Garty); Best Supporting Actress, (Charhi); Cinematography; and Soundtrack.

Following its release in Israel, the film sold over 600,000 tickets, breaking box office records.
