= Ido Kozikaro =

Israeli basketball player

Ido Kozikaro עידו קוז'יקרו
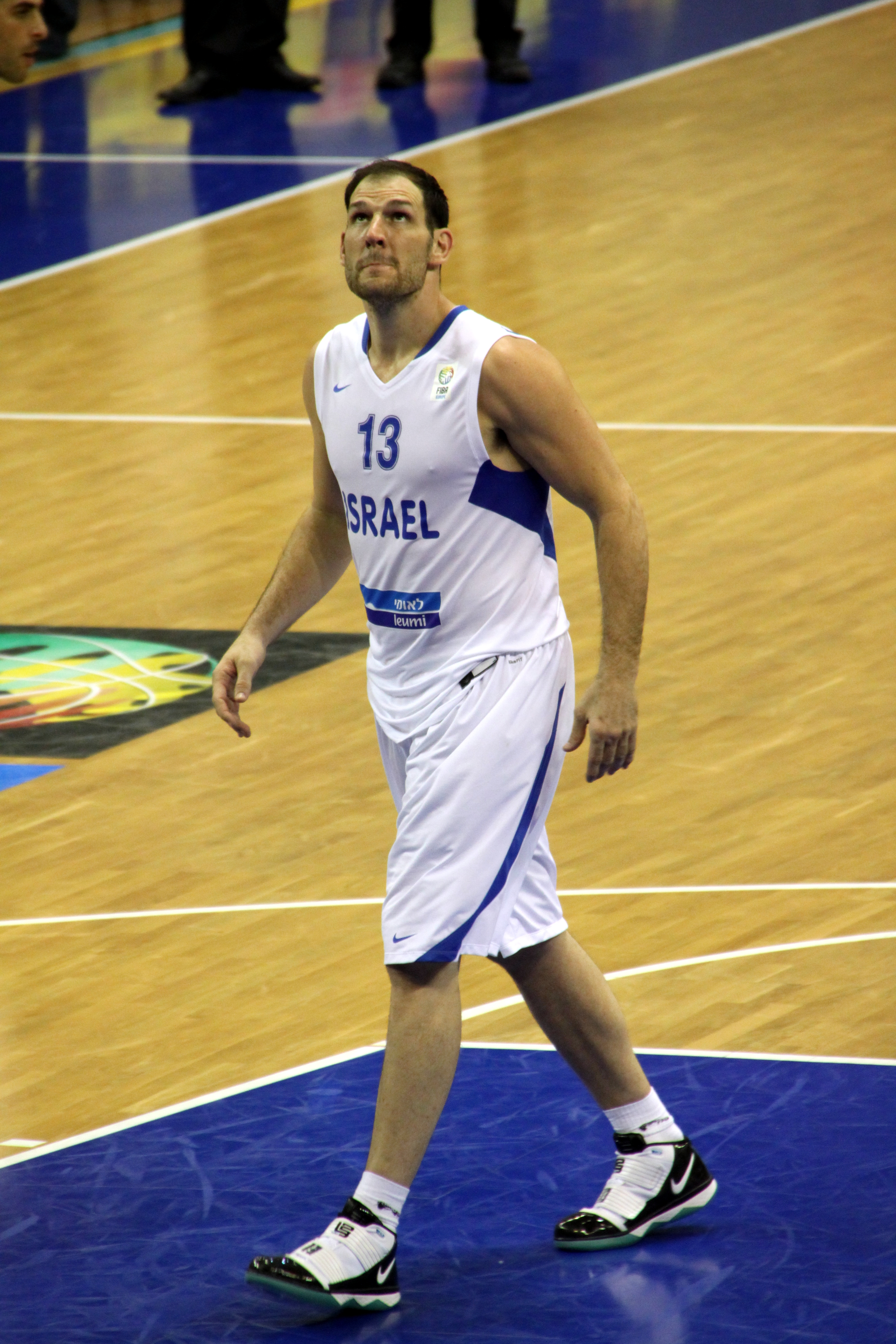

Personal information
- Born: January 8, 1978 (age 48) Kiryat Shmona, Israel
- Listed height: 6 ft 8 in (2.03 m)
- Listed weight: 260 lb (118 kg)

Career information
- Playing career: 1996–2014
- Position: Center

Career history

Playing
- 1996-2003: Hapoel Galil Elyon
- 2003-2006: Hapoel Jerusalem
- 2006-2008: Ironi Nahariya
- 2008-2010: Maccabi Haifa
- 2010-2012: Hapoel Gilboa Galil
- 2012-2014: Maccabi Haifa

Coaching
- 2014-2016: Maccabi Haifa (team manager)

Career highlights
- EuroCup champion (2004); Israeli League champion (2013); Israeli League Rebounding Leader (2003)

Ido Kozikaro (Hebrew: עידו קוז'יקרו; originally Cojocaru) (born January 8, 1978) is an Israeli 2.03 m (6 ft 8 in) tall center former basketball player. He is mostly known for his tenure playing for Maccabi Haifa BC. In 2002-03 he was the top rebounder in the Israel Basketball Premier League.

== Professional career ==
Kozikaro made his debut with Hapoel Galil Elyon in 1996–97, and played with the team through its 2002–03 championship season. In 2002-03 he was the top rebounder in the Israel Basketball Premier League. He played for Hapoel Jerusalem from 2003–04 through its 2005–07 championship season.

He played for Hapoel Ironi Nahariya in 2006–07 and its 2007–08 championship season. Kozikaro played for Maccabi Haifa from 2008–09 through its 2009–10 championship season. He signed with Hapoel Gilboa Galil Elion for the 2010–11 season.

== Israeli national team ==
He was a member of the Israeli U-22 National Team at the 1998 European U-22 Championship. He was a member of the Israeli National Team at the 2001, 2003, 2005, 2007, and 2009 European Championships.
