= Cojoc =

Cojoc is a Romanian surname, meaning a traditional Romanian winter coat made of sheepskin. Notable people with the surname include:

- Constantin Cojoc (born 1981), Romanian judoka
- Samoel Cojoc (born 1991), Romanian footballer

== See also ==
- Cojocaru
