= Micky Rabinovitz =

Micky Rabinovitz (Hebrew: מיקי רבינוביץ') is an Israeli film producer and company owner of "Light Stream Israel".

== Biography ==
Micky Rabinovitz has been working in the Israeli film industry for 3 decades. He worked as a producer and company owner in "Metro Communications" for a few years. In 2006 Rabinovitz founded "Light Stream Israel", his own film production company with Mr. Jim Abrams from the USA.

== Filmography ==
=== Feature films ===
- 2018 - Aad Hakatze (Gesta 2) - Producer - Director: Kobi Mahat - shooting August 2017
- 2017 - Gesta - Producer - Director: Kobi Mahat - shooting August 2016
- 2015 – Silent Victory – Pre Pro - Producer
- 2015 - Last Verse – Director: Udi Aloni – producer – Davis Silber – Line producer
- 2014 - Baba Jon - Director: Yuval Dalshad – Line producer – shooting May 2014
- 2014 – Sand Birds – Director: Amir Wolf – shooting Feb 2014 - Line producer
- 2013 – Apples from the Desert – directors: Matti Harari and Arik Lubetzki – Line producer
- 2013 – Hill start – Director: Oren Stern – Line producer
- 2011 – Kidon – Director: Emmanuel Naccache - Producers: Moshe Edery & Michael Sharfstien – Line Producer
- 2010 – Playoff – Director: Eran Riklis - shooting in Germany – producers: Michael Sharftien & Moshe Edery - Line Producer
- 2008 - A House Divided (Mount of Olives) – Director: Mitch Davis - Production Services to an American Film
- 2008 - Hello Goodbye – A France movie with Gérard Depardieu - Production services
- 2007 - Storm Of Emotion – Producer. Feature documentary, 84 min. director: Yael Klopmann – The movie won many prizes around the world and was short listed to the Academy of motion pictures 2007
- 2006 - Aviva My Love – Director: Shemi Zarhin - Co-Producer.
- 2006 - Bubble – Director: Eytan Fox - Co-Producer
- 2005 - Joy – Director: Julie Shles - Co-Producers
- 2004 - Metallic Blues – Director: Dan Verete - Co-Producer
- 2004 - Turn Left at the End of the World - Director: Avi Nesher – Co-Producer
- 2004 - Columbian Love - Director: Shay Kanot - Co-Producer
- 2004 - Walk on Water – Director: Eytan Fox - Co-Producer
- 2003 - Sima Vaknin, a Witch – Director: Dror Shaul – Producer
- 2002 - The B.B.Q People – Co-Producer
- 1996 - Minotaur – Director: Jonathan Tammuz - Producer
- 1994 - Scar – Director: Haim Bouzaglo – Producer

=== Television Series and Dramas ===
- 1999 - Zinzana – Director Haim Bouzaglo - The 39 episodes series features highlights of prison stories in Israel
- 1997 - Yarkon Files - Director Haim Bouzaglo - Recipient of the 1997 Israeli Academy awards for Television series
- 1998 - Pisces - Television 90 Min. Drama
- 1998 - The Southern Beach - A mini-series of five 50 min. episodes
- 1996 - First Loves - A three 50 min. episode mini-series for television
- 1996 - The Field of Hope - A Television Drama
- 1996 - The Marzipan Woman – Director Eitan Green - A 50 minutes television drama

=== Documentaries ===
- 2012 - Through the Eyes of Yoni Hamenahem – Director: Yael Klopmann – 40 years of Israeli cinema
- 1998 - Cosmic Optimism - 6 episodes (30 min. each) - India
- 1998 - The Crossing to Firellia - A 50 min.
- 1998 - Bonjour Madame, Raymonde el'Beduwia - A 50 minutes documentary - Moroccan
- 1997 - What's So Funny? - A mini series of 4 episodes, 25 min. each.

=== Other projects ===
- Many commercials, four of which were produced for American Television, Two commercials for “McDonald's” China, “Remington” for the US TV.
- 17 min. infomercial – Olive Oil – US market
- Many Video clips of Israeli artists, among them: The Black Tulip, Nikmat HaTraktor, Sharon Haziz, Is Hop...
- Fiddler on the Roof - A musical special for TROS, the Netherlands, the Dutch television, for the national celebration Jerusalem 3,000. Director: Ralph Inbar.
- 1992 - Bible Travel - A 13-part ZDF (German TV) drama - Line producer
- 1992 - Ben Gurion - Part of a French series, Director: Jerry Schatzberg - Line producer
- 1991 - Bit of luck – feature film – Directed by Ze'ev Revach - Line producer
- 1991 - Tel Aviv's stories - Directors Ayelet Menahemi and Nirit Yaron - feature film - Production Manager
- 1990 - Stolen Father 3 – feature film – Director Ayelet Menahemi - Production Manager
- 1990 - 3 weeks in Jerusalem with Faye Dunaway – feature film – Director Amos Kollek - Production Manager
- 1989 - Breaking - feature film - Director: Yosi Zomer - Line producer
- 1988 - The owl - feature film - Director: Amnon Rubinstein - Line Producer
- 1987 - Lemon Popsicle 7 - feature film - Director: Walter Bannert - Location Manager
- 1986 - Gloves – feature film - Director: Rafi Hadar - Line producer
- 1985 - Shovrim - feature film - Director: Avi Nesher - Location Manager
- 1984 - Rage & Glory - feature film - Director: Avi Nesher- Location Manager
- 1985 - Girls - feature film - Director: Nadav Levitan - Location Manager
- 1984 - The Ambassador - feature film - Director: J. Lee Thompson - Art department asst.
- 1982 - Around the world - feature film - Director: Alan Yakobovitz - Location Manager.
- 1980-93 Producer / Line producer: Commercials and documentaries in Israel and abroad.
