= Danny Comden =

American actor

- Born: Danny Hill Comden; April 10, 1969 (age 57); Beverly Hills, California, California, U.S.
- Occupations: Actor, film director, film producer, screenwriter
- Years active: 1994–present

Danny Hill Comden is an American actor, director, film producer and writer. He is best known for playing Stevie Hanson in the ABC sitcom I'm with Her, Blake in Urban Legend and Roger Nicholl in Pretty Persuasion. He wrote and directed Sol Goode, in which he also starred. He also appeared in Father of Invention, Dunston Checks In, Breakin' All the Rules and Dirt.

== Filmography ==
| Year | Title | Role | Notes |
|---|---|---|---|
| 1994 | Baywatch | Al | TV series (episode: Baja Run) |
| 1996 | Dunston Checks In | Norm | |
| 1996 | An Occasional Hell | Craig Fox | |
| 1997 | Volcano | Ascending Cop | |
| 1998 | Urban Legend | Blake | |
| 2001 | Fast Sofa | Brad | |
| 2002 | The Johnny Chronicles | Johnny Monroe | TV film |
| 2002 | Highway | Shanks | |
| 2003– 2004 | I'm with Her | Stevie Hanson | TV series (22 episodes) |
| 2003 | Sol Goode | Cooper | Also director and writer |
| 2004 | Breakin' All the Rules | Sam | |
| 2005 | Unscripted | Himself | TV series (episode #1.2) |
| 2005 | Pretty Persuasion | Roger Nicholl | |
| 2005 | Punk'd | Himself | TV series (episode #5.5) |
| 2006 | The Danny Comden Project | Danny | TV film; also producer and writer |
| 2006 | Jump | Danny | TV film; also producer and writer |
| 2007 | The Call | Nick | TV film; also producer |
| 2007 | Live! | Buck | |
| 2008 | Dirt | Ted Rothman | TV series (3 episodes) |
| 2008 | Pushing Daisies | Rob Wright | TV series (episode: Robbing Hood) |
| 2010 | Father of Invention | Matt James | |
| 2015 | Your Family or Mine | Jason | Series regular |
