= I'm with Her (TV series) =

American sitcom television series

- Genre: Sitcom
- Created by: Chris Henchy; Marco Pennette
- Starring: Teri Polo; David Sutcliffe; Rhea Seehorn; Danny Comden
- Opening theme: "Is She Really Going Out with Him?" by Sugar Ray
- Composer: Rhett Miller
- Country of origin: United States
- Original language: English
- No. of seasons: 1
- No. of episodes: 22

Production
- Executive producers: Jack Burditt; Joe Davola; Chris Henchy; Marco Pennette; Brian Robbins; Mike Tollin
- Producer: Faye Oshima Belyeu
- Camera setup: Multi-camera
- Running time: 30 minutes
- Production companies: Tollin/Robbins Productions; Pennette & Henchy Productions; Warner Bros. Television

Original release
- Network: ABC
- Release: September 23, 2003 – April 27, 2004

I'm with Her is an American sitcom television series created by Chris Henchy and Marco Pennette, starring David Sutcliffe and Teri Polo, that aired on ABC from September 23, 2003 to April 27, 2004.

== Synopsis ==
The series, loosely based on creator Chris Henchy's relationship with wife Brooke Shields, begins on that chance meeting. Patrick Owen (David Sutcliffe), a down-to-earth and dedicated high school teacher, grabs a cup of coffee with his best friend and fellow teacher Stevie (Danny Comden), when he's bitten by a dog. The owner of the dog is famous movie star Alex Young (Teri Polo). Over her apologies, Patrick recognizes Alex and makes light of the situation. Before leaving, Alex gives Patrick her phone number so he can contact her for any medical costs incurred.

Despite the incessant pleading of Stevie to call her, Patrick feels that Alex is out of his league. Back at Alex's house, her overprotective, cynical and bitter sister, Cheri (Rhea Seehorn), panics about the dog biting and how Alex could give a complete stranger their phone number. Alex is not as suspicious, and slightly hopeful that he'll call. Cheri has her doubts, thinking it's a bad idea for Alex to be interested in a "civilian" (someone not in the biz). However, fate and chemistry prove stronger than perceived impressions, and Alex and Patrick begin dating. Patrick is unprepared for the chaos that comes with Alex. He loses his anonymity and is stalked by paparazzi, which jeopardizes his job. Stevie adds to the problem with his constant busy-bodying and attempts to force his way into the relationship of Patrick and this huge star.

The season finale, which was also the series finale, was left on a cliffhanger which was never resolved as the series was canceled after 22 episodes.

== Cast ==
=== Main cast ===
- Teri Polo as Alex Young
- David Sutcliffe as Patrick Owen
- Danny Comden as Stevie Hanson
- Rhea Seehorn as Cheri Baldzikowski

=== Guest cast ===
Guest actors included Jim Belushi, Peter Dinklage, Robert Englund, Peri Gilpin, Harry Groener, Keegan-Michael Key, Jimmy Kimmel, Wayne Knight, Nick Lachey, Penny Marshall, Marlee Matlin, Joan Rivers, Cybill Shepherd, Brooke Shields, Jonathan Slavin, Susan Sullivan, Betty White, Kristen Wiig and Burt Young.

== Production ==
Marco Pennette and Chris Henchy, who co-created the series, were the executive producers along with Mike Tollin, Brian Robbins, Joe Davola and Jack Burditt.

== Episodes ==
| No. | Title | Directed by | Written by | Original release date | Prod. code | Viewers (millions) |
|---|---|---|---|---|---|---|
| 1 | "Pilot" | Ted Wass | Chris Henchy & Marco Pennette | September 23, 2003 | 475213 | 13.19 |
| 2 | "The Second Date" | Ted Wass | Carol Leifer | September 30, 2003 | 177004 | 11.95 |
| 3 | "The Smarty Party" | Ted Wass | Chris Henchy & Marco Pennette | October 7, 2003 | 177001 | 12.34 |
| 4 | "The Musical" | John Fortenberry | Jack Burditt | October 14, 2003 | 177003 | 8.47 |
| 5 | "The Weekend Away" | John Fortenberry | Bryan Behar & Steve Baldikoski | October 21, 2003 | 177005 | 8.47 |
| 6 | "All About Evil" | Philip Charles MacKenzie | Jack Burditt | October 28, 2003 | 177008 | 9.13 |
| 7 | "The Last Action Queero" | Shelley Jensen | Nancy Steen | November 11, 2003 | 177010 | 8.93 |
| 8 | "Alex Misses the Boat" | Ted Wass | Bryan Behar & Steve Baldikoski | November 18, 2003 | 177007 | 8.89 |
| 9 | "Meet the Parent" | Robby Benson | April Pesa | November 25, 2003 | 177006 | 9.30 |
| 10 | "The Greatest Christmas Story Ever Told" | Robby Benson | Jack Burditt | December 23, 2003 | 177012 | 7.58 |
| 11 | "The Heartbreak Kid" | Joe Regalbuto | Nancy Steen | January 6, 2004 | 177013 | 9.52 |
| 12 | "The Kid Stays in the Picture" | John Fortenberry | Jack Burditt | January 13, 2004 | 177015 | 8.17 |
| 13 | "Party of Two" | Ted Wass | Story by : Jack Burditt; Teleplay by : Bryan Behar & Steve Baldikoski | January 27, 2004 | 177011 | 6.99 |
| 14 | "Poison Ivy" | Shelley Jensen | Chris Henchhy & Marco Pennette | February 10, 2004 | 177017 | 5.81 |
| 15 | "Not in My Dress You Won't" | Shelley Jensen | Nancy Steen & Lenny Ripps | February 17, 2004 | 177016 | 6.78 |
| 16 | "Winners & Losers & Whiners & Boozers: Part 1" | Shelley Jensen | Jack Burditt | February 24, 2004 | 177018 | 6.85 |
| 17 | "Winners & Losers & Whiners & Boozers: Part 2" | Shelley Jensen | Bryan Behar & Steve Baldikoski | March 2, 2004 | 177019 | 6.73 |
| 18 | "The Peck-Peck" | John Fortenberry | Donald Todd | March 16, 2004 | 177009 | 6.28 |
| 19 | "Eight Simple Rules for Dating a Celebrity" | John Fortenberry | Marsh McCall | March 30, 2004 | 177002 | 6.11 |
| 20 | "Friends in Low Places" | Arlene Sanford | Paul Corrigan & Brad Walsh | April 6, 2004 | 177014 | 5.35 |
| 21 | "Drama Queen" | Joe Regalbuto | Hugh Webber | April 20, 2004 | 177020 | 5.59 |
| 22 | "I'm Not with Her" | Marco Pennette | Paul Corrigan & Brad Walsh | April 27, 2004 | 177021 | 5.23 |
