= Father of Invention =

2010 film

- Theatrical release poster
- Directed by: Trent Cooper
- Written by: Jonathan D. Krane; Trent Cooper
- Produced by: Kevin Spacey; Ken Barbet; Dana Brunetti; Kia Jam; Jonathan D. Krane; Jason Sciavicco
- Starring: Kevin Spacey; Camilla Belle; Heather Graham; Johnny Knoxville; Anna Anissimova; Craig Robinson; Virginia Madsen
- Cinematography: Steve Yedlin
- Edited by: Heather Pearsons
- Music by: Nick Urata
- Production companies: Pangea Media; Sunrise Films; K Jam Media; Jonathan Krane Motion Picture Organization; Horizon Entertainment; Trigger Street Productions
- Distributed by: Anchor Bay Films
- Release dates: February 15, 2010 (Berlinale); October 14, 2011 (United States)
- Running time: 120 minutes
- Country: United States
- Language: English
- Budget: $11.5 million
- Box office: $97,778 (Russia)

Father of Invention is a 2010 American comedy–drama film directed by Trent Cooper, and stars Kevin Spacey, Camilla Belle and Johnny Knoxville.

== Plot ==
Robert Axle, a New Orleans–based infomercial guru, loses it all when one of his inventions maims thousands of customers. After eight years in a maximum-security prison, Axle is ready to redeem his name and rebuild his billion-dollar empire. But first he must convince his estranged daughter to let him live with her and her quirky, over-protective roommates.

== Cast ==
- Kevin Spacey as Robert Axle
- Virginia Madsen as Lorraine
- John Stamos as Steven "Steve" Leslie Thurmond
- Johnny Knoxville as Troy Coangelo
- Camilla Belle as Claire Elizabeth (formerly Axle but dropped the last name after her father went to prison.)
- Heather Graham as Phoebe
- Michael Rosenbaum as Eddie
- Anna Anissimova as Donna
- Craig Robinson as Jerry
- Rhoda Griffis as Penny Camp
- Jack McGee as Parole Officer
- Danny Comden as Matt James
- Marc Macaulay as Grocery Store Clerk
- Mary Elizabeth Cobb as Sheila
- Julia Lashae as Lily’s Mother

== Reception ==
On Rotten Tomatoes the film has a 0% rating based on reviews from 16 critics, with an average rating of 3.82/10. On Metacritic the film has a score of 36% based on reviews from eight critics, indicating "generally unfavorable" reviews.

Kirk Honeycutt of The Hollywood Reporter wrote: "Comedies don't get much more unfunny than Father of Invention, a lame and somewhat preachy comic take on a father trying to get back into his daughter's good graces."
