= Savri Maranan (TV series) =

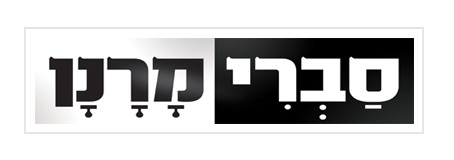
- Genre: Sitcom
- Created by: Ruby Duenyas; Yaniv Polishook
- Written by: Ruby Duenyas; Yaniv Polishook; Yamit Sol; Eli Drai
- Starring: Dvir Benedek; Rotem Abuhav; Tuvia Tzafir; Sandra Sade; Yehoram Gaon; Yona Elian; Yamit Sol; Ami Smolartchik; Kobi Marziano; Tamara Klingon; Edna Blilious; Tom Avni; Liat Har Lev (2011–2014); Yaniv Polishook; Yarden Bracha (2016–2025); Galit Giat (2017–2022); Kobi Farag (2017–2025)
- Opening theme: "Mi Ohev Et HaShabat?" (Who Likes the Saturday?) – Instrumental
- Country of origin: Israel
- Original language: Hebrew
- No. of seasons: 8
- No. of episodes: 323 (list of episodes)

Production
- Producers: Nava Kolton; Einav Zilber
- Running time: 23 minutes
- Production company: Tedy Productions

Original release
- Network: Channel 2 (Keshet) (seasons 1–3); Keshet 12 (season 4–)
- Release: August 4, 2011 – March 14, 2025

Related
- Το σόι σου Your Family or Mine

Savri Maranan (Hebrew: סַבְרִי מָרָנָן) is an Israeli sitcom television series.

== History ==
Savri Maranan was produced by Keshet and Tedy. The show was created by Ruby Duenyas and Yaniv Polishook. It originally aired on Channel 2, and currently airs on Channel 12.

In May 2014 the series was sold to TBS, the new American version was called Your Family or Mine. It premiered on April 7, 2015.

The show's final episode aired on 14 March 2025.

== Plot ==
The series stars the family of Shay Rosen and Shani Hasson, who are from different ethnic groups. Shay's family is of Ashkenazi descent, while Shani's family is of Mizrahi descent.

The show follows the family as they visit their extended families for Shabbat dinner, where most of their escapades occur. Most of the show's comedy is derived from stereotypes of the two ethnic groups and the differences between them.

The show's name is derived from a traditional expression, part of the Kiddush.

== Cast ==
=== Main cast ===
- Dvir Benedek as Shai Rosen
- Rotem Abuhav as Shani Rosen-Hasson

=== Rosen Family ===
- Tuvia Tzafir as Pinchas (pini) Rosen, Shai's father
- Sandra Sade as Rivka (Riki) Rosen-Pinkus, Shai's mother
- Yaniv Polishook as Itamar (Itamarmelada) Rosen, Shai's brother
- Liat Har Lev as Michal Rosen, Itamar's wife (seasons 1-2) (In season 3 ex-wife)
- Tom Avni as Adam (Adamke) Rosen, Shai's brother
- Yarden Bracha as Sapir (George) Rosen-Cohen, Adam's wife (season 3 - present)
- Galit Giat as Liora (Liri) Gabriel, Itamar's girlfriend (season 4 - present)

=== Hasson Family ===
- Yehoram Gaon as Silvan (Sali) Hasson, Shani's father
- Yona Elian as Rachel Helena Hasson, Shani's mother
- Yamit Sol as Orna Katz-Hasson and Efrat Hasson, Shani's sisters
- Ami Smolartchik as Moshe Katz, Orna's husband
- Kobi Maor as Menachem (Manny) Hasson, Shani's brother
- Tamara Klingon as Alin Hasson, Manny's wife
- Edna Blilious as Meirav Hasson, Shani's sister
- Kobi Farag as Aharon Katz, Moshe's brother and Meirav's husband (season 4 - present)

== Production ==
On June 19, 2012 the series was renewed for a second season. Production began in June 2012 and ended in August 2012.

The third season was announced on March 1, 2016 and it premiered on March 11, 2016.

The fourth season began filming on April 20, 2017 and finished filming on June 13, 2017. The season premiered on November 3, 2017 on the new Keshet 12 channel.

The fifth season began filming on March 25, 2018 and finished filming on May 22, 2018.

The sixth season was announced by Yaniv Polishook on November 26, 2018. Filming started on December 9, 2018 and ended on February 11, 2019.

The seventh season hasn't been officially announced yet, but Yaniv Polishook has confirmed that the writing and pre-production has started.

== Series overview ==
Season	Episodes	Originally released	
Season	Episodes	First released	Last released
1	42	August 4, 2011	January 24, 2012
2	40	March 26, 2013	September 19, 2014
3	40	March 11, 2016	August 5, 2016
4	40	November 3, 2017	July 13, 2018
5	40	December 14, 2018	September 13, 2019
6	41 (Note: Originally 40 episodes were produced, but during the COVID-19 pandemic a special episode was produced and aired on May 1, 2020 as part of Season 6)	January 3, 2020	October 23, 2020

== Ratings ==
Season	Episodes	Premiered		Ended		Viewers
Season	Episodes	Date	Premiere viewers	Date	Finale viewers	Viewers
1	42	August 4, 2011	27.9%	January 24, 2012	29.1%	23.1%
2	40	March 26, 2013	23.2%	September 19, 2014	15.8%	22.3%
3	40	March 11, 2016	20.5%	August 5, 2016	14.6%	27.8%
4	40	November 3, 2017	12.5%	July 13, 2018	9.5%	TBA
5	40	December 14, 2018	13.5%	September 13, 2019	12.7%	TBA
6	41	January 3, 2020	13.1%	October 23, 2020	9.7%	TBA

== Adaptations ==
A Greek adaptation under the title Το σόι σου (romanized: to soi su, English: Your family), premiered on Alpha TV, on October 23, 2014, stopped on June 25, 2019, after five seasons and 307 episodes in total and got a reboot with a new season and new episodes on October 31, 2025.

On April 7, 2015, an American adaptation of the show premiered in the TBS under the title Your Family or Mine. It only aired for one season.

While not an adaptation of the show, the 2011 British series Friday Night Dinner has some similarities to Savri Maranan.
