= Tom Avni =

Israeli actor and television host

- תום אבני
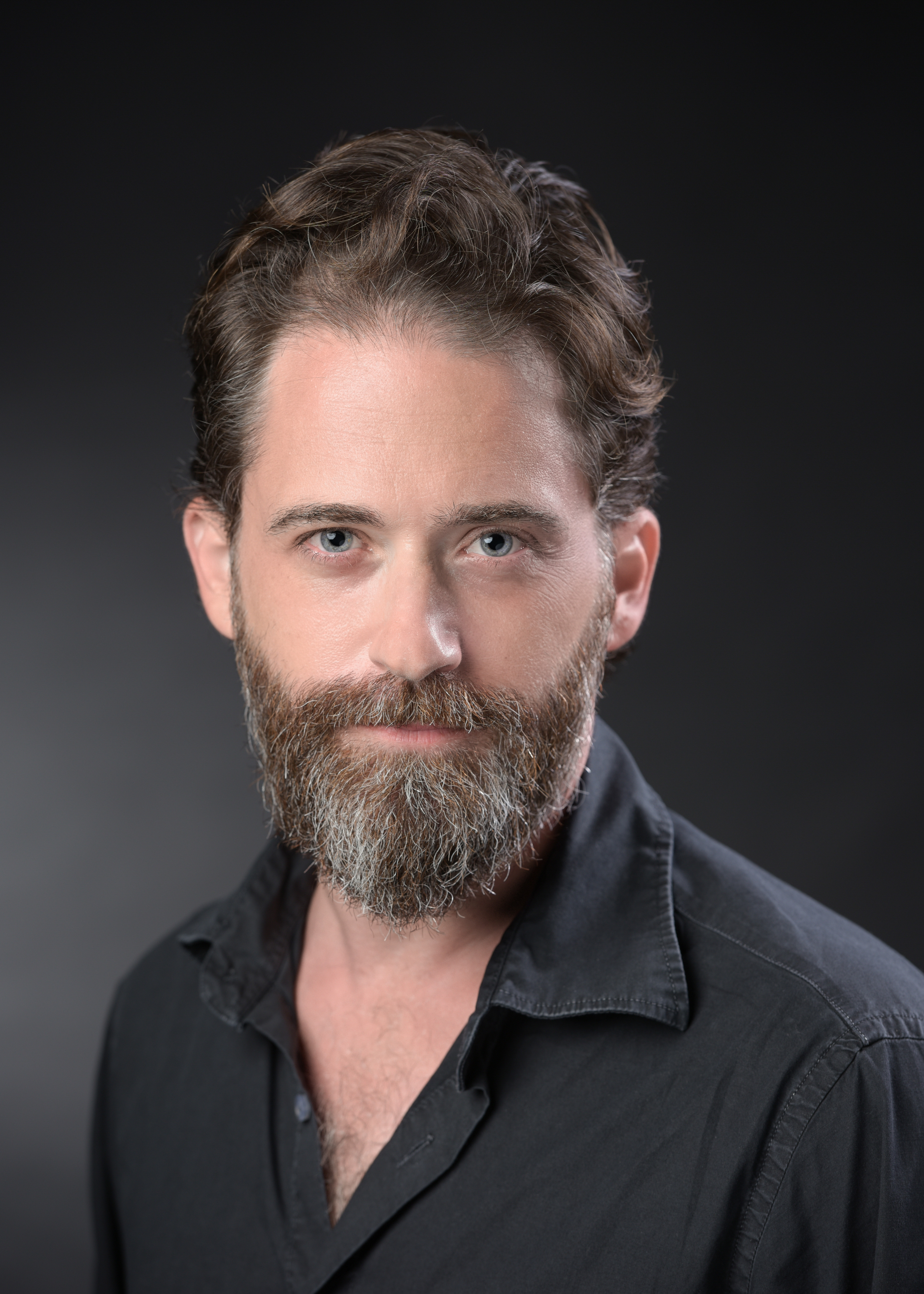
- Born: April 20, 1986 (age 40); Eilat, Israel
- Spouse: Liraz Charhi

Tom Avni (Hebrew: תום אבני) is an Israeli actor, TV host, director and voice actor.

== Background ==
Avni was born on April 20, 1986 in Eilat, Israel. His father, Nir Avni was a diver of Lithuanian-Jewish and Polish-Jewish descent, being one of the founders of Dolphin Reef. His mother, Ofra Bar Zion, was a dance teacher born in Algeria.

== Stage career ==
In 1996, he gained his first significant exposure, when he was 10 years old, when he played Mowgli, the main role in the musical "The Jungle Book", alongside Tuvia Tzafir and Hanoch Rosen. In the following years, Avni participated in the musicals "King of Siam" (2000), "Tiny" (2002), "Tom Sawyer and Huckleberry Finn" (2003) and "Aladdin" (2004). In 2019, he played Adoniya, the son of David, in the play "The Next One", a political thriller by Shahar Pinkas and directed by Shir Goldberg. In 2022, he acted in the play "I'm Your Grandma", written by Itay Sontag, which was performed at the Cameri Theater.

== Film career ==
Avni's first appearance on television was in 1990, at the age of 4, in the program Garden Party.

In 1997, he starred and hosted Festigal, and even came in second place in the competition with the song "Luna Park", which he performed together with Nalia Tzachman.

A year later, Avni played the main role in the film "Super Boy".

In 2002, he became a presenter for Arutz HaYeladim, at the age of only 16.

In 2003, he participated in five episodes of the Argentinian series Rincón de Luz. In 2004, Avni participated in a show with the stars of the series "Rincón de Luz" in Israel. In the same year, he was the lead voice actor in the movie "Peter Pan".

From 2005 to 2008, Avni completed his service in the IDF in a military band of the Education Corps. In 2005 he participated in the show Shir Nold and began to star in the children's series of the children's channel HaShminiya where he played the character of Daniel Harris. Later that year he voiced in the movie Racing Stripes. In 2007, a mockumentary program that followed his life called "24/7 - Tom Avni" aired on the children's channel Hot 3. That year he also participated in Festigal.

Avni participated in the telenovelas "The Champion" and "Bovut", both on the "Hot 3" channel, in 2007-2008. In 2008 he joined the cast of the second season of the series "The Island", in the role of Rick Brody.

On June 24, 2009, he left Arutz HaYeladim.

In 2010, he acted alongside Lior Ashkenazi and Gal Zeid in Sigal Avin's film "You Will Know No More Sorrow", which was made as part of the 48 Hour Film Project.

In 2011, he played the role of Bini Meltzer, the poster boy of the Har Tzur yeshiva, in the drama series of Yes, "Urim VeTumim". In the same year, he participated in the panel of experts in the show "The Dumbest Man in the World".

Starting in August 2011, Avni appeared in the role of Adam Rosen, Shay and Itamar's brother, in all eight seasons of the comedy series "Savri Maranan", broadcast as part of Keshet Broadcasting.

In 2016 he played in Avi Nesher's film Past Life in the role of Jeremy Kotler, the husband of Nana Miller, played by Nelly Tagar.

In 2018, he played the character of Yanir Nehushtan in the drama series "State Rules" broadcast on HOT, in addition he also played in the series "She Has It". In the same year he directed the final episode of the series "The Hood".

In 2020, he played Captain Tamir, an officer in the blacksmith camp, in the series Valley of Tears that aired on Kan 11. In the same year he also participated in Festigal for the third time, as "the surprise" where his daughter performed the same song he performed at a previous Festigal.

In 2021, he played in Avi Nesher's film "Image of Victory", in the role of Yarah Bleiberg.

In 2022, he directed "Identity Cards" in "Big Brother".

In 2023, the series "The Malevolent Bride" was broadcast on Kan 11, in which Avni played the character of the physicist Dov Baer.

In 2024, Avni played the lead role in the play The Indian Patient, written by Reshef Levi, which was presented at the Cameri Theater.

== Personal life ==
Avni is married to the singer and actress Liraz Charhi and the two have two daughters. Five members of Avni's family were murdered during the Be'eri massacre amid the October 7 attacks.
