= Ioanna Asimakopoulou =

Greek actress

Ioanna Asimakopoulou Ιωάννα Ασημακοπούλου
- Born: June 5, 1984 (age 41); Athens, Greece
- Education: Giorgos Kimoulis Drama School
- Occupation: Actress
- Years active: 2006-present
- Notable work: To soi sou

Ioanna Asimakopoulou (born June 5, 1984) is a Greek actress. She graduated from the Giorgos Kimoulis Drama School in 2006. She became particularly well known to the general public through the series To soi sou, while other participations followed in series such as Peta ti friteza, I Familia and Deligianneio Parthenagogeio.

== Biography ==
She was born on June 5, 1984, in Athens, where she grew up, and is originally from Nafpaktos. After finishing school, she decided to become an actress and for this reason she took exams at the Giorgos Kimoulis Higher Drama School and began her studies. She graduated in 2006, beginning her career as an actress in television, theater and cinema.

== Filmography ==
=== Television ===
Year	Title	Role	Notes	Reference
2007-2008	Deligiannis Girls' School	Eleni Sgouropoulou	Series regular, 28 episodes	
2008	Safe Sex TV Stories	client	Episode: "Nobody is perfect"	
2008	Safe Sex TV Stories	nurse	Episode: "The Revenge of the Proletariat"	
2008-2009	Lola	Julia	Series regular, 202 episodes	
2014-2019	Your Family	Andonia Tsiridou	Main role, 166 episodes	
2019-2020	Throw the fryer away	Petra Garakouda	Main role, 52 episodes	
2020-2021	The Family	Mary Kritikou Armaousi	Lead role, 56 episodes	
2022	Don't start moaning	Lina	1 episode	
2022-2023	Save Me	Rania Pomanou	Lead role, 8 episodes	
2023	I Am Jo	Jo	Lead role, 8 episodes; also creator	
2023-2024	Act like you're asleep	Daphne	Lead role, 64 episodes	

=== Film ===
Year	Title	Role	Notes	Ref.
2006	Straight Story	woman on bar	uncredit role	
2007	A bee in August	Hilda's mother		

== Theater ==
He has participated in numerous theatrical performances and has collaborated with famous actors such as Pavlos Chaikalis, Giannis Zouganelis, Pavlos Orkopoulos, Vladimiros Kyriakidis and Vaso Goulielmaki.

- 2010-2011 A Pebble in the Lake (Ena vostalo sti limni), Gloria Theatro
- 2011-2012 I Will Make You Queen (Tha se kano Vasilissa), Gloria Theatro
- 2011-2012 I Saw Light and Went In (Eida fos kai mpika), Komis-Bar
- 2012-2013 The Righteous (Oi dikaioi), Fairy Tale Theatro
- 2012-2013 Kyria Julia, PK Theatro
- 2015-2016 The Four Legs of the Table (Ta tessera podia tou trapeziou), Jenny Karezi Theatro
- 2016 (Summer) Three & One (Treis kai mia), Foundry Theatro
- 2016-2017 The Loop (H Thilia), Argo Theatro
- 2017 (Summer) The Lost Gem of Knowledge (To xameno petradi tis gnosis), Tour
- 2017-2018 The Strange Couple (To parakseno zevgari), Zina Theatro
- 2018-2019 Alarms, Alpha Theatro Idea
- 2019 (summer) The Imaginary Patient (O kata fantasian asthenis), Tour
