= Your Family or Mine =

- Genre: Sitcom
- Based on: Sabri Maranan by Ruby Duenyas & Yaniv Polishuk
- Developed by: Greg Malins
- Starring: Kyle Howard; Kat Foster; Danny Comden; Andrew Lees; Stephanie Hunt; Cynthia Stevenson; Ed Begley Jr.; JoBeth Williams; Richard Dreyfuss; Constantine Ganosis
- Composer: John Nordstrom
- Country of origin: United States
- Original language: English
- No. of seasons: 1
- No. of episodes: 10

Production
- Executive producers: Greg Malins; Jamie Tarses; Rubi Duanias; Yaniv Polishuk; Avi Nir; Ran Telem; Tamira Yardeni
- Camera setup: Multi-camera
- Running time: 30 minutes
- Production companies: The Malins Company; FanFare Productions; Keshet International; Tedy Productions; Sony Pictures Television

Original release
- Network: TBS
- Release: April 7 – June 9, 2015

Your Family or Mine is an American sitcom series based on the Israeli series Savri Maranan (Hebrew: סברי מרנן). The series is centered on a young married couple, Oliver (Kyle Howard) and Kelli (Kat Foster), and alternates between their two families living in New York and Los Angeles. Your Family or Mine was announced by TBS in mid 2014 with a ten-episode order. It premiered on April 7, 2015. On October 23, 2015, TBS quietly cancelled the series after one season.

== Cast ==
=== Main ===
- Kyle Howard as Oliver Weston
- Kat Foster as Kelli Weston
- Danny Comden as Jason Weston, Oliver's older brother
- Andrew Lees as Blake Weston, Oliver's younger brother
- Stephanie Hunt as Dani Durnin, Kelli's youngest sister
- Cynthia Stevenson as Jan Durnin, Kelli's mother
- Ed Begley Jr. as Gil Durnin, Kelli's father
- JoBeth Williams as Ricky Weston, Oliver's mother
- Richard Dreyfuss as Louis Weston, Oliver's father

=== Recurring ===
- Angela Kinsey as Claire Weston, Jason's wife
- Collette Wolfe as Shawni Durnin, Kelli's younger sister
- Jared Breeze as Dougie Durnin, Shawni's son
- Adrian Gonzalez as Enzo, Shawni's boyfriend
- Constantine Ganosis as Jonathan (European distribution)

== Episodes ==
TBS announced that the first season will contain a total of ten episodes; it premiered on April 7, 2015.

| No. | Title | Directed by | Written by | Original release date | Prod. code | U.S. viewers (millions) |
|---|---|---|---|---|---|---|
| 1 | "Pilot" | Gail Mancuso | Greg Malins | April 7, 2015 | 101 | 1.15 |
| 2 | "The Durnins" | John Whitesell | Greg Malins | April 14, 2015 | 104 | 1.14 |
| 3 | "The Couch" | Gary Halvorson | Greg Malins | April 21, 2015 | 103 | |
| 4 | "The Will" | David Trainer | Natalie Abel-Wais | April 28, 2015 | 102 | 1.16 |
| 5 | "Christmas in July" | Michael Shea | Barry Schwartz | May 5, 2015 | 109 | 1.31 |
| 6 | "The Speech" | Phill Lewis | Tracy Dawson | May 12, 2015 | 105 | 1.12 |
| 7 | "5 Stages" | Michael Shea | Lacey Marisa Friedman | May 19, 2015 | 106 | 1.17 |
| 8 | "The Pantry" | Phill Lewis | Juliet Seniff | May 26, 2015 | 107 | 1.38 |
| 9 | "Presents" | Linda Mendoza | Stephanie Furman Darrow | June 2, 2015 | 108 | 1.63 |
| 10 | "The Vows" | David Trainer | Michael Lisbe & Nate Reger | June 9, 2015 | 110 | 1.27 |
