= Ziv Cojocaru =

Israeli composer

Ziv Cojocaru זיו קוז'וקרו (Hebrew)
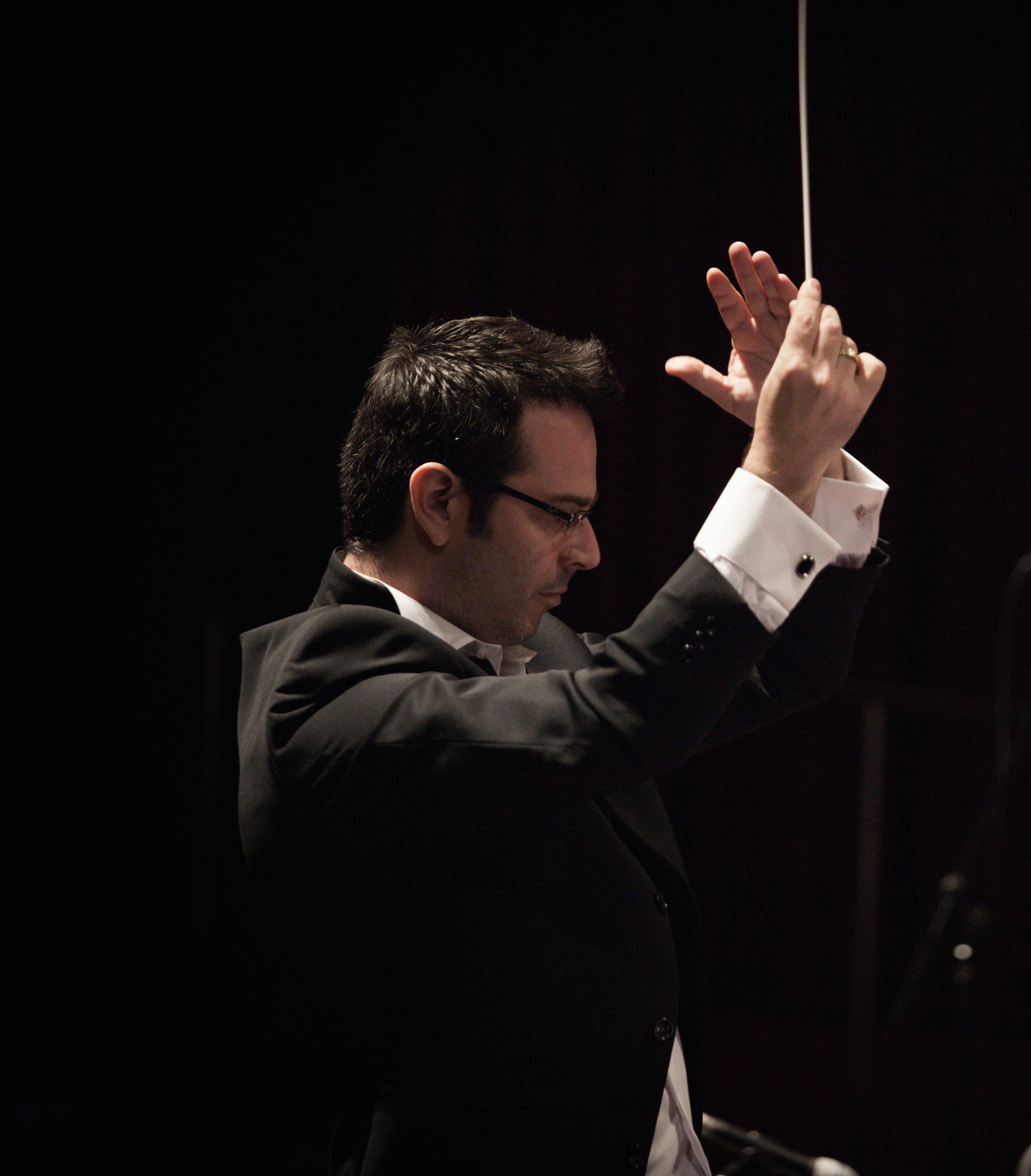
- Cojocaru in 2014

Background information
- Born: 1977 (age 48–49); Beersheba, Israel
- Occupation: Composer
- Years active: 1998–present

Ziv Cojocaru (Hebrew: זיו קוז'וקרו) is an Israeli composer, conductor, arranger, and pianist. He serves as Associate Professor and Head of the Music Division in the Department of the Arts at Ben-Gurion University of the Negev. He is also Composer-in-Residence with the Israel Symphony Orchestra Rishon LeZion. Cojocaru is the recipient of the ACUM Prize (2025) and the Prime Minister's Award for Composers (2015).

== Biography ==
Ziv Cojocaru was born and raised in Beersheba. He began his musical training studying piano at the city’s conservatory. Cojocaru studied composition and conducting at the Jerusalem Academy of Music and Dance, earning both bachelor’s and master's degrees in both fields, and completed his doctorate in composition at Bar-Ilan University. He has also participated in masterclasses with Philippe Leroux, Pierre-André Valade, Ivan Fedele, Fabian Panisello, and others. Since 2009, he has been a faculty member at the Jerusalem Academy of Music and Dance, serving as Head of the Department of Music Theory, Composition and Conducting from 2019 to 2022. From 2018 to 2023, he served as Conductor in Residence for the Israel Sinfonietta Beersheba. Currently, he serves as Associate Professor and Head of the Music Division in the Department of the Arts at Ben-Gurion University of the Negev, as Composer-in-Residence of the Israel Symphony Orchestra Rishon LeZion (since 2024), and as a board member at the Israeli Composers' League.

== As composer ==
As a composer, his works have been performed in Israel and internationally at events such as the ISCM World Music Days Festival, the Asian Composers League Festival (ACL), the MATA Festival in New York, ECCO concerts (European Composer and Songwriter Alliance) in Luxembourg and Belgium, the Tonraum21 Festival for new music in Graz, Salzburger Festtage alter und neuer Musik, the INTRADA and MERIDIAN contemporary music festivals in Romania, the 11th Taiwan International Percussion Convention, and Days of Music in Skopje, Macedonia. Major venues include the Konzerthaus Berlin (Euro Classic Festival), Arnold Schönberg Center in Vienna, and Merkin Hall in New York. In Israel, his music has been featured at the Israeli Music Festival, Sounds in the Desert, the Aviv Competitions, and the Voice of Music in the Upper Galilee Festival.

His works have been performed by, among others, Ensemble l’Itinéraire (France), Zeitfluss Ensemble (Austria), Ensemble Reconsil (Austria), Ensemble Sturm und Klang (Belgium), Atem Ensemble (Romania), Moscow Contemporary Music Ensemble (Russia), and United Instruments of Lucilin (Luxembourg). In Israel, his music was performed by the Israel Symphony Orchestra Rishon LeZion, Jerusalem Symphony Orchestra, Israel Camerata Jerusalem, Israel Sinfonietta Beer Sheva, Israel Chamber Orchestra, Sinfonietta Ra’anana, Tel Aviv Soloists Ensemble, Weimar–Jerusalem Young Philharmonic, Meitar Ensemble, Tremolo Ensemble, Israel Contemporary Players, Israeli Contemporary String Quartet, and Ensemble Tempera. Collaborators and conductors include Michael Sanderling, Pierre-André Valade, Dan Ettinger, Omer Meir Wellber, Ilan Volkov, David Greilsammer, and Ariel Zuckerman. His works are published by the Israel Music Center (IMC) and the Israel Music Institute (IMI). His music has been recorded and broadcast in Israel and abroad, including by BBC Radio 3, Deutschlandfunk Kultur, Voice of Music Radio, Kan Radio, and more.

== As conductor ==
As a conductor, his work in Israel includes collaborations and appearances with leading orchestras, among them the Israel Philharmonic Orchestra, the Jerusalem Symphony Orchestra, the Israel Symphony Orchestra Rishon LeZion, the Haifa Symphony Orchestra, the Israel Camerata Jerusalem, the Israel Chamber Orchestra, the Netanya Kibbutz Chamber Orchestra, and the Ra’anana Symphonette. From 2018 to 2023, he served as Conductor in Residence of the Israel Sinfonietta Beer Sheva and appeared regularly with the orchestra. Abroad, he has conducted the Wiener Concert-Verein (Austria) and the Filarmonica de Stat Botoşani (Romania). He has additionally collaborated with the Meitar Ensemble and the Moran Singers Ensemble.

== As arranger ==
Cojocaru's works are performed regularly by the Israel Philharmonic Orchestra, the Jerusalem Symphony Orchestra, the Israel Symphony Orchestra, the Haifa Symphony Orchestra, the Israel Chamber Orchestra, The Israel Sinfonietta, the Tel Aviv Soloists Ensemble, the Raa'nana Symphonette, the NK Orchestra - Israel, the Tel Aviv Jazz Big Band, the Meitar ensemble, the Tempera ensemble, and others.

== Popular music collaborations ==
Since the late 1990s, Cojocaru has been active as an arranger, musical director, producer, pianist, and conductor within Israeli popular music, collaborating with leading artists such as Gidi Gov, Shlomo Artzi, David Broza, Danni Robas, Alon Oleartchik, Shalom Hanoch, Asaf Amdursky, Rona Kenan, Shuli Rand, Amir Benayoun, Yehuda Poliker, Eran Zur, Rita, Riki Gal, Yoni Rechter, Dudu Tassa, Rami Kleinstein, Shlomo Gronich, Yehudit Ravitz, Yizhar Ashdot, Shlomi Shaban, Ninet, Kobi Aflalo, Avraham Tal, Harel Skaat, and Maurice El Medioni, among others. He has contributed to prominent stage and studio productions and participated in several of Israel's top-rated TV shows.

== Pedagogical work ==
Ziv Cojocaru is Associate Professor and Head of the Music Division within the Department of the Arts at Ben-Gurion University of the Negev. He previously served as Head of the Composition and Conducting Department and as a senior faculty member at the Jerusalem Academy of Music and Dance. Cojocaru has led academic programs and supervised graduate students in composition, orchestration, and theory.

He has presented masterclasses, lectures, and colloquia at leading institutions worldwide, including Universität für Musik und darstellende Kunst Graz, Liszt Ferenc Academy of Music Budapest, The Estonian Academy of Music and Theatre Tallinn, Conservatorio di Musica "E.R. Duni" Matera, Hochschule für Musik Nürnberg, Hochschule für Musik Würzburg, Conservatoire à rayonnement régional de Paris, West University of Timișoara, Taipei National University of the Arts, Tel Aviv University, and Bar-Ilan University.

In addition to his academic activities, Cojocaru serves as an academic and pedagogical advisor to major performing bodies in Israel, acts as a jury member in composition competitions and scholarship committees, and is a board member of the Israel Composers' League.

== Awards, prizes and grants ==
- 2025 – The ACUM Composition Award for Achievement of the Year in Concert Music.
- 2018 – The Israel Lottery Council for the Culture and Arts Grant for a commissioned composition.
- 2017, 2014 – The Ministry of Culture Grant for a commissioned composition.
- 2015 – The Prime Minister Award for composers.
- 2009 – The Israel Sinfonietta Award for conductors.
- 2000 – The TAMUZ Award (Israel Popular Music Industry Prize) for best instrumental performance in a recorded album.

== Works (selection) ==
- “Fractured” for Piano and Orchestra (2025)
- Run! Into the Circles! Run Out!, for Six musicians (2024)
- GroovoMetrics, for Four Percussionists (2023)
- Songs on the Lives of Children, for Mezzo-Alto and Orchestra (2022)
- Winds over Jaffa , for wind Orchestra (2022)
- Guitar Concerto, for E.Guitar solo and large ensemble (2019)
- I wanted to scream songs at you, song cycle for Soprano and Orchestra (2019)
- The Tempera Sketches, for mixed ensemble & Orchestra (2018)
- Five Intermezzi - for strings orchestra (2017)
- Still talking – conversations for percussionist & Orchestra (2017)
- Whence Comest Thou, Whither Wilt Thou Go – for chamber orchestra (2017)
- Hide and seek – for flute, clarinet, violin and cello (2016)
- Links.Metamorphosis – for large orchestra (2015)
- BBBeeezzz – for violin/ Viola, clarinet/ bass clarinet and piano (2015)
- Colors in the dust – for orchestra (2014)
- XoOx..! formus agitatus (the Septet version) – for flute, clarinet, violin, viola, cello, Percussion and piano (2014)
- XoOx..! formus agitatus (the Trio version) – for violin, Percussion and piano (2013)
- Do you like Bill? - for flute, clarinet, violin, cello and piano (2013)
- Pulse – for piano and orchestra (2012)
- Betrayed – for nine musicians and narrator (2012)
- Urban inquiries – for six musicians (2012)
- “From the disappearing world” for string quartet (2009)
- "Chronicles of letters in a bottle" - three miniatures for small orchestra (2009)
- Elvish moods – for solo clarinet (2008)
