= The Jungle Book (musical) =

1996 Israeli musical

The Jungle Book - The Musical
- Music: Miron Minster and Ariel Zilber
- Lyrics: Ephraim Sidon
- Book: The Jungle Book
- Setting: The Indian Rainforest
- Premiere: 1996: Beit Lessin Theater, Tel Aviv

The Jungle Book - The Musical (Hebrew: ספר הג'ונגל - המחזמר) is an Israeli musical based on Rudyard Kipling's book by the same name, with notable influence by Disney's 1967 film adaptation thereof. It was adapted by Ephraim Sidon, with music composed by Miron Minster and Ariel Zilber. Hanoch Rosen directed the original production in 1996 and the revival in 2024.

== History ==
The musical was first performed at the Beit Lessin Theater in Tel Aviv in 1996, and at the Nega Hall in Jaffa, where it ran for 211 performances in front of approximately 300,000 viewers. The musical was produced in collaboration with Tamir Productions Ltd., and won the Israeli Theater Prize in the Musical of the Year category for 1996. The musical's songs, along with a shortened version of the story narrated by Avi Yaffe as Packli the squirrel, were distributed on VHS. In December 1996, a film called "Jungle Hero" was produced for Arutz Hayeladim directed by Natan Gur Levy, documenting the behind-the-scenes of the show. At the end of November 2013, Classiclet released a DVD containing the full version of the 1996 musical. Over time, this production, along with the musical's song cassette, became a cult film among young people who watched it as children, and even "active screening" events were held based on it.

In 2002, it returned to the stage once again for 30 performances in front of approximately 50,000 viewers, and auditions were held on Arutz HaYeladim for children to play the role of Mowgli.

Between April 17, 2002, and Sukkot 2003, the musical was performed at the Ramat Gan Safari (produced by Miki Peled - Solan Productions), where an additional 200,000 people saw it. Afterward, the musical returned to halls throughout the country from Sukkot 2003 to the summer of 2004.

In Hanukkah 2013, the musical was staged by the Beit Zvi acting school for 50 performances (in collaboration with Tamir Productions Ltd., who produced the first production of the musical), directed by Hanoch Rosen and featuring students from the class of 2013, Beit Zvi graduates, and children.

In July 2014, the musical was staged again at the Ramat Gan Safari produced by Miki Peled - Solan Productions.

=== 2024 revival ===
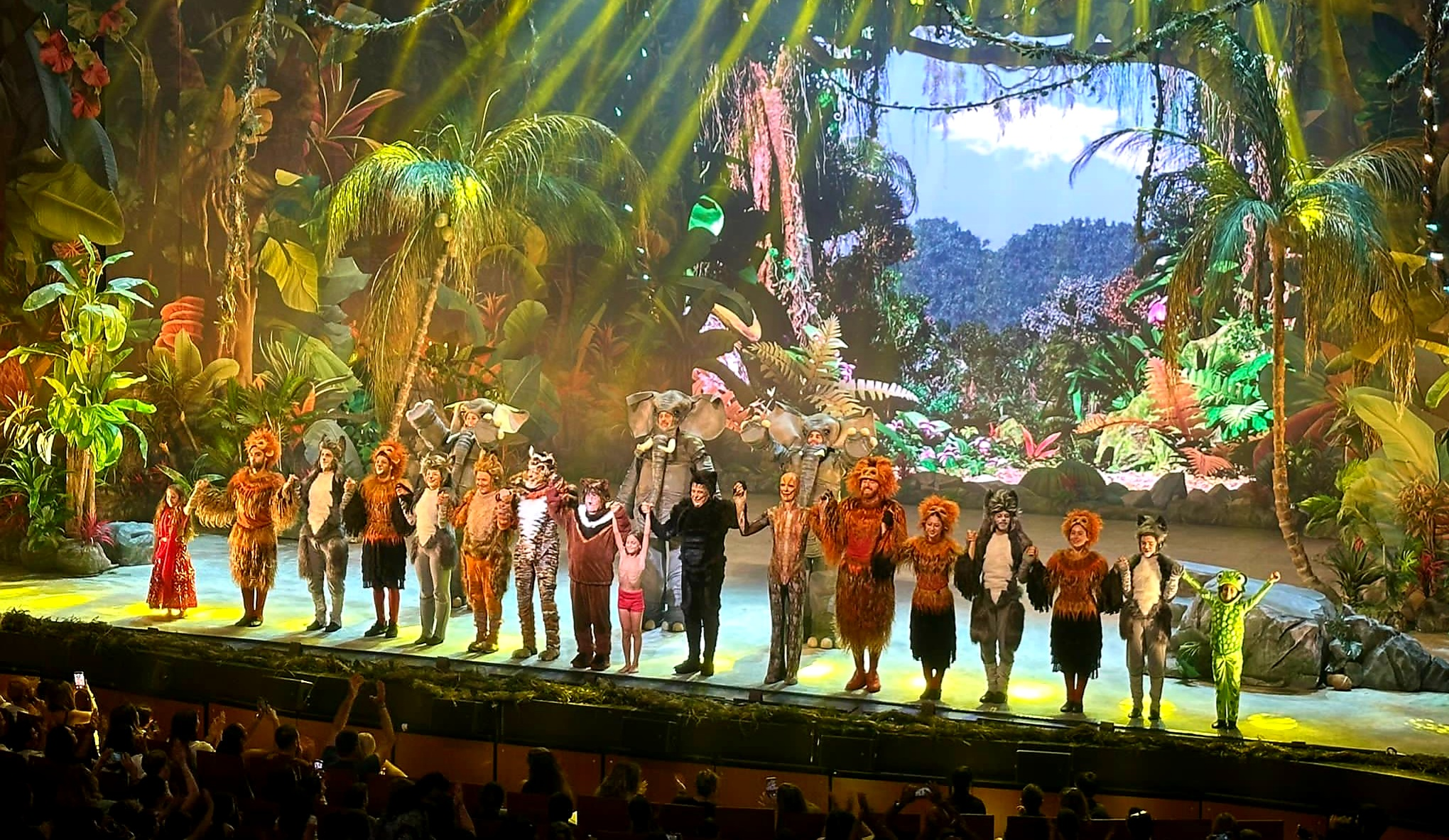
The Jungle Book the Musical (2024)

In August 2024, the musical returned to the stage, again directed by Hanoch Rosen, and featuring actors who played in the original version. Tuvia Tzafir as Baloo the bear, Sassi Keshet as Bagheera the panther, Eli Danker as Shere Khan the tiger, Yossi Toledo as Kaa the snake, Avi Yaffe as Packli the squirrel, and Pini Kidron as the leader of the elephants, with the actor Eddie Alterman replacing the original monkey leader, who was Yossi Toledo in the original production. The plot and text remained mostly the same, as did the songs, except for two: "Monkey King," which was replaced with a song about the monkey leader's desire to be like Mowgli, and "Dangers of the Jungle" by Bagheera, which was replaced with a song by Bagheera about a happy day in the jungle.

To comply with laws restricting the employment of minors, in the revival there are eleven children playing Mowgli and Bana. In the original production, when Tom Avni played Mowgli, this law was not enforced, so he only had one replacement: Oshri Cohen.

== Plot ==
Raksha, a kind-hearted wolf, finds a small baby who was swept away in a wrecked boat, and she adopts him along with her little cubs. She names the human cub she finds Mowgli.

Mowgli grows up in the jungle with his friends Baloo the bear, Bagheera the panther, Packli the squirrel, and other animals.

After hearing that the cruel tiger Shere Khan has returned to the jungle, Mowgli's friends advise him to go to the village of the humans. Mowgli thinks they are not his friends and runs away from them. On his way, he encounters a cunning snake named Kaa who wants to hypnotize him. Luckily for Mowgli, Shere Khan sees Mowgli and fights with Kaa over the prey. While Shere Khan and Kaa are fighting each other, Mowgli meets a group of monkeys who lock him in a cage. Luckily for Mowgli, Baloo the bear disguises himself as a monkey and dances with the monkeys, and Mowgli and Baloo escape from them.

When Shere Khan finds Mowgli and Baloo, Mowgli throws a burning branch at Shere Khan, and Shere Khan runs away from the jungle.

He meets Bana, a girl from the human village who was walking in the jungle. After all the adventures he has been through, Mowgli realizes how dangerous jungle life is for him, he decides to join her, and he says goodbye to his jungle friends.

== Cast ==
Character	Actor in the 1996 production	Actor in the 2002 production	Actor in the Safari production (2002 - 2003) and in halls throughout the country (2003 - 2004)	Actor in the Beit Zvi production, Hanukkah 2013	Actor in the Safari production (2014)	Actor in the 2024 production
Mowgli	Tom Avni / Oshri Cohen	Guy Canaan / Yarden Politzer / Eitan Greenberg	Guy Canaan / Yarden Politzer	Noam Osadon / Yam Goldstein / Aral Haziza / Yehav Magoz / Gia Bar Gurvitz / Reviv Madar	Alon Sandler / Reviv Madar	Lotan Faran / Matan Stern / Ziv Kira / Eli Nachmani / Roy Gaber / Arz Ganem
Baloo the bear	Tuvia Tzafir	Tuvia Tzafir	Tzachi Noy	Alon Dahan / Lior Hakon / Mor Pinkel	Tzachi Noy	Tuvia Tzafir / Eddie Alterman
Bagheera the panther	Sassi Keshet / Gadi Yagil / Oshik Levi	Sassi Keshet	Roee Nigri	Aviram Avitan / Yotam Kuznets	Yotam Kuznets	Sassi Keshet / Eddie Alterman
Shere Khan the tiger	Eli Danker / Mati Seri	Eli Danker	Rafael Barzilay / Yaniv Eliyahu	Ivan Loria		Eli Danker
Kaa the snake, Monkey King	Yossi Toledo	Erez Weiss	Erez Weiss / Eran Hagi	Gili Gabel / Yoav Milstein (Kaa), Gili Gabel / Noam Amit (Monkey King)	Yoav Milstein, Gili Gabel	Yossi Toledo (Kaa the snake), Eddie Alterman / Dotan Amrani (Monkey King)
Packli the squirrel	Avi Yפה	Avi Yפה	Gil Keften / Maoz Patel	Gia Bar Gurvitz' / Yakir Shokron	Oded Paz / Gia Bar Gurvitz'	Avi Yaffe
Raksha (Mother Wolf), Monkey, Bird, Doe	Dana Raz / Maya Levandovsky	Michal Minster	Dancers from Sigi Nissan's studio/Dancers from Limor Shulav's studio	Yifat Aharoni / Moran Bardea / Sharon Crook		Alona Tenenbaum
Bana, Wolf	Nelia Zechman / Meital Michaeli / Aviv Levkovitz	Joy Rieger / Roni Ackerman / Roni Goldberg	Joy Rieger / Roni Ackerman / Roni Goldberg	Ella Armoni / Adi Bity / Billy Carmeli / Gaia Maman / Naia Federman	Amit פרקש / Amit Yagur	Eden Cohen / Lia Zech / Yael Levy / Emma Nener-Lally / Ariel Levin Belchrovitz / Sarah Mary Luiz / Tohar Avital
Monkey, Wolf, Toad, Baby Elephant	Matan Blu / Lil Patishi	Idan Shuker / Snir Shoshana / Shaked Pachema	Idan Shuker / Snir Shoshana / Shaked Pachema	Gili Gabel / Noam Amit (Toad) Shahar Matlon / Yoav Milstein / Noam Amit / Chen Salman (Monkey, Wolf, Baby Elephant)		
Leader of the Elephants, Monkey, Wolf, Bear	Pini Kidron	Pini Kidron	Dancers from Sigi Nissan's studio / Dancers from Limor Shulav's studio	Mika Ben Shaul / Mor Pinkel		Pini Kidron
Wolf, Chameleon, Elephant, Monkey	Sharon Yefet	Sharon Yefet	Dancers from Sigi Nissan's studio / Dancers from Limor Shulav's studio	Mor Pinkel / Shay Friedman / Sharon Crook / Neta Reviv (Wolf, Elephant, Monkey)		Shira Alterman
Wolf, Peacock, Elephant, Monkey	Claire Ben David	Claire Ben David	Dancers from Sigi Nissan's studio / Dancers from Limor Shulav's studio	Chen Salman / Shay Friedman (Peacock), Dana Avidor / Adi Avrahami / Yifat Aharoni / Gia Bar Gurvitz' (Wolf, Monkey, Elephant)		
Treacherous Wolf, Monkey, Elephant	Sami Samir	Sami Samir	Dancers from Sigi Nissan's studio / Dancers from Limor Shulav's studio	Mika Ben Shaul / Moran Bardea / Gili Gabel / Keren Gazit / Shahar Matlon / Yoav Milstein / Noam Amit / Chen Salman		
Treacherous Wolf, Monkey, Elephant	Itzik David	Itzik David	Dancers from Sigi Nissan's studio / Dancers from Limor Shulav's studio	Ila Dangor / Nadav Zilberman / Ivan Loria / Lior Murdoch		
Patta the Elephant				Negba Maor		

Additional actors: Yehuda Nahari, Gili Gabel, Shahar Matlon, Noam Amit, Yifat Aharon, Yotam Kuznets, Yoav Milstein.

== Creators ==
Adaptation and lyrics: Efraim Sidon Direction: Hanoch Rosen Music: Miron Minster and Ariel Zilber Set design: Avi Shkowi Lighting: Alon Porat and Amir Brenner Costumes: Ella Kolsnik Movement: Marina Beltov Acrobatics and stage combat: Ilan Gazit

== Songs ==
The musical's songs (as written on the DVD cover of the musical):

#	Original Song Title	Performance	Notes
1	Jungle Laws	Baloo the Bear and the cast	
2	Mowgli	Everyone	
3	The Bear's Song	Baloo the Bear and Mowgli	
4	The Elephant Parade	The elephants	
5	The Temptation - The Snake's Song	Kaa the Snake	
6	Dangers of the Jungle - Bagheera's Song	Bagheera the Panther and the Peahen	Did not appear in the 2024 musical, replaced with another song called "Hello to the Jungle"
7	Monkey King	Monkey King	Did not appear in the 2024 musical, and was replaced with a song also called "Monkey King" but the song is about the desire to be like Mowgli
8	Mowgli is Mine Now - The Tiger's Song	Shere Khan the Tiger	
9	The Love Duet - Mowgli and Bana	Mowgli and Bana	
10	Jungle Music	No performer, music only	
11	Musical Medley from the Show's Songs	No performer, music only	
12	Finale Song	Everyone	
13	End of First Act (The Bear's Song chorus)	Baloo the Bear, Bagheera the Panther, Packli the Squirrel and Mowgli	Did not appear in the 1996 playlist although it was in the show, but in the 2024 playlist this song appeared as song number six
