= The Miracle of the Sargasso Sea =

2019 thriller/drama Greek film

- Directed by: Syllas Tzoumerkas
- Written by: Youla Boudali; Syllas Tzoumerkas
- Produced by: Maria Drandaki; Titus Kreyenberg; Ellen Havenith; Olle Wirenhed; Anthony Muir; Meinolf Zurhorst; Yaba Holst
- Starring: Angeliki Papoulia; Youla Boudali; Christos Passalis; Argyris Xafis; Thanassis Dovris; Laertes Malkotsis; Maria Filini; Christian Culbida; Thanos Tokakis; Michalis Mathioudakis; Laertis Vassiliou; Alkistis Poulopoulou; Katerina Helmy
- Cinematography: Petrus Sjövik F.S.F.
- Edited by: Andreas Wodraschke
- Music by: Jean-Paul Wall drogatek Phoebus
- Production companies: Homemade Films unafilm PRPL; Film i Väst; ZDF/ARTE; ERT; NOVA
- Distributed by: New Europe Film Sales; Strada Films; Real Fiction; Against Gravity
- Release date: 10 February 2019 (Berlin International Film Festival)
- Running time: 121 minutes
- Countries: Greece; Germany; Netherlands; Sweden
- Languages: Greek, English

The Miracle of the Sargasso Sea (Greek: Το Θαύμα της Θάλασσας των Σαργασσών), is a 2019 thriller/drama Greek film with horror and surrealist elements, directed by Syllas Tzoumerkas. It tells the story of two women— a police woman and an eel hatchery worker— whose solitary lives cross when a circle of violence erupts in the poor, small town of Western Greece where they live. Angeliki Papoulia, Youla Boudali and Christos Passalis lead the film's ensemble cast.

Tzoumerkas' third film after Homeland (Hora Proelefsis, 2010) and A Blast (2014), The Miracle of the Sargasso Sea had its world premiere at the Panorama section of the 69th Berlinale.

== Cast ==
- Angeliki Papoulia as Elisabeth
- Youla Boudali as Rita
- Christos Passalis as Manolis
- Argyris Xafis as Vassilis
- Laertis Malkotsis as Andreas
- Thanassis Dovris as Michalis
- Maria Filini as Axel
- Michalis Kimonas as Vangelis
- Christian Culbida as Dimitris, Elisabeth's son
- Laertis Vassiliou as Grigoris
- Michalis Mathioudakis as Mitsos
- Thanos Tokakis as The priest and Christ
- Alkistis Poulopoulou as Faye
- Katerina Helmy as The mother
- Romanos Kalokyris as The young terrorist
- Areti Seidaridou as The young student
- Marianna Bozantzoglou as Nefeli
- Nikos Diotis as Lambros
- Vassilis Svigos as Policeman at the beach
- Ektor Liatsos as Eel hatchery worker
- Yorgos Tsemberopoulos as The police chief
- Haris Attonis as Jairus
- Anna Djordjikia as Mary
- Petros Chytiris as Joseph
- Akis Mitsoulis as The Holy City Saloon DJ

== Plot ==
After supervising a violent police raid of the Anti-terrorist Unit in Athens, Elisabeth is dismissively sent away to the small town of Missolonghi to serve as the local police chief. Ten years after her downgrading, a heavy alcoholic and a scandal to the local community, Elisabeth is still stuck in the swampy little town, together with her only son, now a teenager. On a morning like any other, Elisabeth's lethargic, desperate routine starts interacting and connecting with the religious visions and the bloody nightmares of a silent and mysterious eel-hatchery worker. When a suicide sets off a series of violent events in the local community, secrets long-hidden in the swamps begin to resurface, leading to a lethal confrontation of the two women with all their suppressors.

== Production ==
As a project in development, The Miracle of the Sargasso Sea was presented at the Berlinale Script Station, the Rotterdam-Berlinale Express (the joint programme of Cinemart and the Berlinale Co-Production Market), the Nipkow programme and A.C.E.. At the Berlinale Co-production Market, the project received the Special Mention of the Eurimages Co-production Development Award Jury.

Produced by Maria Drandaki (Homemade Films), with Titus Kreyenberg (unafilm), Ellen Havenith (PRPL), Olle Wirenhed (Kakadua Films), Anthony Muir (Film I Väst), Meinolf Zurhorst (ZDF/ARTE) and Yaba Holst (Svensk Filminstitutet) co-producing, the Greek-German-Dutch-Swedish co-production started shooting in September 2017. The production was supported by Eurimages, Creative Europe - Media, the Greek Film Centre, the Film und Medienstiftung NRW, the Netherlands Film Fund, the Netherlands Film Production Incentive and the Swedish Film Institute.

Filming took place in Missolonghi, the Aetolia-Acarnania region, Arta and Athens. Extensive shootings took place at the Missolonghi lake and the deltas of the rivers Achelous and Arachthos. The scenes of the industrial production of the eel were shot at the Geitonas eel hatchery in Arta.

Petrus Sjövik was the film's director of photography and Jorien Sont the film's production designer. Costumes were designed by Marli Aliferi. Hair, make-up and make-up VFX were designed by Linda Boije af Gennäs and Evi Zafiropoulou. The film's original music was composed by three varied musicians: Swedish classical composer Jean-Paul Wall, the Greek alternative minimal techno band drog_A_tek, and pop songwriter Phoebus. Jean-Paul Wall's themes were recorded by the Göteborg String Orchestra, conducted by Joachim Gustafsson. It was edited by Andreas Wodraschke.

== Release ==
The first international teasers of the film appeared in Variety in October 2018 and the first international trailer at The Hollywood Reporter in January 2019.

The film premiered at the Panorama section of the 2019 Berlin International Film Festival. Its official premiere took place at the Zoo Palast, and was presented by Michael Stultz. New Europe Film Sales announced its theatrical release in a series of territories (including Germany, Greece, Poland, Korea, and Sweden), and the film continued its festival outings with participations at the 2019 BiFan - Bucheon Fantastic International Film Festival (Asian premiere), the Beaune International Thriller Festival, the International Istanbul Film Festival, the Transylvania International Film Festival, among others.

== Reception ==
After its premiere in Berlinale, the Guardian's film critic Peter Bradshaw gave the film a 3/5 star review, calling it "A Lynchian psychodrama in the sun" and "a disquieting spectacle of strangeness". The Hollywood Reporter and Screen International praised the film for its direction, imagery and the committed performances of Angeliki Papoulia and Youla Boudali, while criticising elements of the script's narrative construction and pace. Guy Lodge in Variety wrote that "“A Blast director Syllas Tzoumerkas returns with an agitated, atmospheric and sometimes confounding exercise in modern Greek tragedy. Tzoumerkas’ latest invites comparisons to the loopier, trash-skirting genre outings of Herzog or Lynch, with the gradual unpeeling of layered madness and corruption in the sleepy working town of Missolonghi occasionally calling to mind an aggressively sunburned Twin Peaks". Savina Petkova of the Electric Ghost gave the film 5/5 stars, writing that "while the film is saturated with Biblical quotes, icons of saints, and church choir songs, its form attends equally to the lowly human, animal, and nature. Pacifying all forms of life under the flag of future deliverance, the promise that each being will attain their most perfect form and self, The Miracle of the Sargasso Sea provides a convergence between religious submission and humanistic agency.”

Victoria Ferguson in the Upcoming gave the film a 3/5 review, praising the cinematography by Petrus Sjövik and "its close shots that capture the inner angst of the characters" and calling The Miracle of the Sargasso Sea visually compelling, and 'a show of great creative ambition from Tzoumerkas.” Italian critic Massimo Lechi wrote in Il Ragazzo Selvaggio magazine that “The Miracle of the Sargasso Sea, set in the inhospitable surroundings of a sun-parched Missolonghi, is a metaphysical thriller loaded with biblical references, an unsettling and disturbing meditation on the concept of paradise featuring two women in profound existential crisis: Elisabeth, (a master Angeliki Papoulia) a disgraced policewoman confined in the province by her superiors following an unfortunate anti-terrorist operation; and Rita (the brave Youla Boudali, also co-screenwriter), a painful figure of a martyr besieged by visions of a mystical background. Tzoumerkas’ cinema is one that’s not afraid of risk or ridicule, one which in fact, has the clear intent of forcing the limits of both the police genre and the auteur film genre, seducing with the skill of its performers and its disquieting aesthetic choices that are never banal. After Homeland (2010) and A Blast (2014), The Miracle of the Sargasso is the third – and more complex – chapter of Tzoumerkas’ ideal trilogy on contemporary Greece.”

== Accolades ==
The Miracle of the Sargasso Sea and Syllas Tzoumerkas were nominated for the Panorama Audience Award and the Teddy Award at the 69th Berlin International Film Festival.
