= Tuvia Tzafir =

Israeli actor

- טוביה צפיר
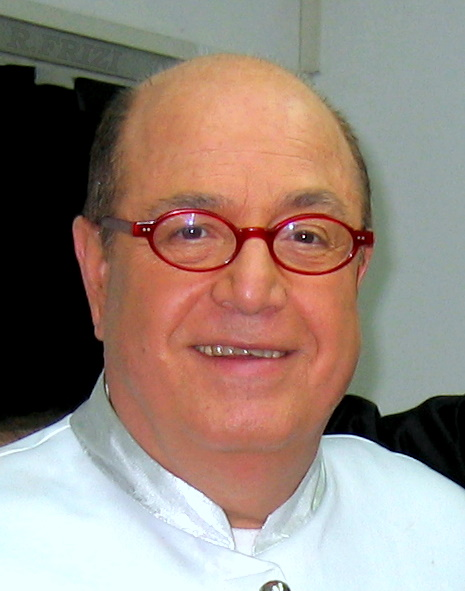
- Tzafir in 2004
- Born: Tuvia Kozlowski; 31 December 1945 (age 80); Tel Aviv, Mandatory Palestine
- Occupations: Actor; comedian; impressionist; television presenter
- Years active: 1964–present
- Spouse: Yael Tzafir (m. 1966)
- Children: 3, including Yoav Tzafir

Tuvia Tzafir (Hebrew: טוביה צפיר; born 31 December 1945) is an Israeli actor, comedian, television presenter and singer.

== Biography ==
Tzafir was born in Tel Aviv as Tuvia Kozlowski. He grew up in a traditionalist home of Jewish immigrants from Poland who lived in the Florentin district of south Tel Aviv. During the early 1960s, Tzafir got his show business breakthrough when he served in the IDF Nahal entertainment troupe. Since then he has become one of Israel's biggest TV, cinema, and stage entertainers, particularly humor and satire television and stage shows.

In the 1970s, Tzafir was in the cast of the successful satire show Nikui Rosh ("Head Cleaning"), in which he began performing imitations of Israeli politicians (such as Yitzhak Rabin, Menachem Begin, etc.). During the 1970s and 1980s, Tzafir acted in many Israeli films, among them Salomonico (1972), Charlie Ve'hetzi (1974), Hagiga B'Snuker (1975), Giv'at Halfon Eina Ona (1976), "Eizeh Yofi Shel Tzarot!" (1976), "Ha-Lahaka" (1979), "Nisuin Nusah Tel Aviv" (1979) and "Ha-Instalator" (1986). In the 1980s, Tzafir appeared as a recurring guest on the Israeli entertainment show Siba LeMesiba (סיבה למסיבה), where he performed imitations of Israeli politicians and participated in a variety of comedy skits. In addition, during that period of time he also guest starred in several episodes of the Israeli sitcom Krovim Krovim. In the 1990s, Tzafir did voices for the Israeli satirical puppet show "Chartzufim"; and starred as Baloo in the Hebrew stage musical adaptation of The Jungle Book. Tzafir famously provided the voice of Genie in the Hebrew version of the Disney animated film Aladdin and its two sequels. In 1999, he played the titular character of the straight-to-video fairy tale medley, Pim Pam Po. In 2004, Tzafir guest starred in the Israeli comical musical drama series "HaShir Shelanu". In 2005, Tzafir guest starred in the comedy drama series Telenovela Ba'am.

Tzafir also starred in several stage shows, most of which were written by satirist Ephraim Sidon.

Since the 2000s, Tzafir mainly participates in Israeli children's stage shows and children video stories on DVD and video.

In 2008 Tzafir participated in the Israeli drama series Danny Hollywood alongside Gila Almagor.

Since 2011 Tzafir has participated in Savri Maranan

== Personal life ==
In 1966, Tzafir married Yael, who also produces Tzafir's entertainment shows. They have three children, including the Israeli film actor and TV director Yoav Tzafir.

In August 2005 an indictment was filed against Tzafir for violent behavior and threats made against an employee at G.G. Studios in Neve Ilan, the production studio of the series Telenovela Ba'am. In January 2006 the Jerusalem civil court approved a plea bargain between Tzafir and the State Attorney's Office, according to which he would be given community service.
