= Joy Rieger =

Israeli actress

- ג'וי ריגר
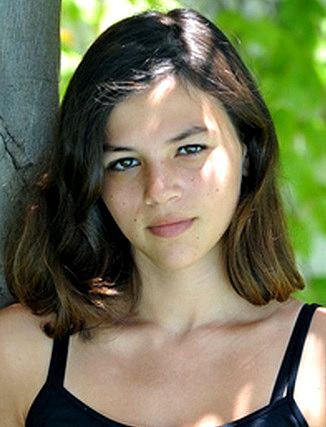
- Rieger in 2017
- Born: 3 March 1994 (age 32); Herzliya, Israel
- Occupation: Actress
- Years active: 2005–present

Joy Rieger (Hebrew: ג'וי ריגר; born 3 March 1994) is an Israeli actress. She is a winner of the Tribeca Film Festival Award for Best Actress in international film, and of the Israeli Television Academy Award.

== Early life ==
Rieger was born in Herzliya to parents who immigrated from Belgium. Her father is Ilan Steve Rieger, and her mother is Evelyn Scheiner-Rieger.

In her youth, she studied at the Thelma Yellin High School for the Arts, majoring in theater, from which she graduated in 2012. She did her military service as a video editor in Unit 8200 of the Intelligence Corps.

== Career ==
Rieger started her acting career as a child in several children plays (the musicals The Jungle Book and The Sound of Music) and in children's roles is TV and films.

From 2012 to 2016, she played a central role for three seasons in the Israeli Nickelodeon youth series The Greenhouse, where she played Dina Navon, a young delinquent who arrives at a high school for leadership.

In 2016 She also played a leading role in Avi Nesher's film Past Life, alongside Nelly Tagar, where the two play a pair of careerist sisters who try to uncover a terrible secret related to their father and the Holocaust.

In December of that year, she played a leading role in the Yes youth series Oboy, in which she played a girl named Alma who pretends to be a man named Ben and tries to get accepted into a boy band to cover her mother's debts. This role won her the Israeli Television Academy Award for best actress in a youth series on 2017.

In 2017 she also played the lead role in the French-Israeli film Virgins. For this role, she won the Best Actress in a Foreign Language Film Award at the Tribeca Film Festival in 2018. The award was presented to her by actor Ray Liotta.

In 2018 she played the lead role in the film The Other Story by Avi Nesher.

In 2019 she played in the TV miniseries Valley of Tears about Yom Kippur War, that was later licensed by HBO Max.

In 2020 she participated in Avi Nesher's film Image of Victory, in the role of Mira Ben-Ari.

In 2021 she played in the Cypriot-Israeli film Patchwork.

In 2023 she played in the French horror film Killer Influence, which won her the best actress award in Festival International du Film Fantastique de Menton.

In 2024 she won honorable mention in Tel Aviv International LGBTQ+ Film Festival for the short film I'm not Okay which she wrote, directed and had the main role in, playing a fictional version of herself.

From December 2025, she will star alongside Tomer Machloof in Noam Shmuel's production of The Caucasian Chalk Circle by Bertold Brecht at the Habima Theater.

== Personal life ==
In 2017, she came out of the closet and revealed her relationship with actress Moran Rosenblatt. In 2018, they separated after 4 years of being together.

In 2020, she had a relationship with actress Carmel Bean. The two separated after about three years.

Although she has had relationships with men in the past, since coming out, Rieger identifies as a lesbian, and speaks openly about her sexual orientation.

As of 2023, she lives in Tel Aviv with her partner, chef Shirel Berger.

== Filmography ==
=== Films ===
Year	Title	Role	Comments
2005	Live and Become	Tali	French Israeli movie
2012	Sex Doll	Tamar	short movie
2016	Valley	Linoy	main role
2016	Past Life	Sephi Milch	main role
2018	Outdoors	Yaeli	
2018	Pilgrim	Anat	
2018	The Other Story	Anat Abadi	main role
2018	Virgins	Lena	main role
2020	Image of Victory	Mira Ben Ari	main role
2021	Patchwork	Melina	Cypriot-Israeli film
2022	Greener Pastures	Dana Levin	
2022	June Zero	Ada	
2023	Arugam Bay	Kim	
2024	I'm not Okay	herself	short movie (writer, director, main role)
2024	Killer Influence	Alex	French movie
2024	The Ring	Alma	
2025	Chicken Master		voice

=== Television ===
Year	Title	Role
2005	Free Lesson	Anna
2012–2016	The Greenhouse	Dina Navon
2013	Popular	Mika
2014	Noy and Hadar	herself
2015	Johnny and the Knights of Galilee	Cheli
2016	Oboy	Alma
2018	Make me a sub	
2019	True Hero	Emma
2019	Daddy Cool	Dana
2020	Valley of Tears	Lt. Daphna
2020	Menagen VeShar	Tchelet
2023	Aviram Katz	Avital
2024	Milano High School	Aya
2024	Who is it?	

=== Theatre ===
Year	Play	Role	Theatre
2002–2004	The Jungle Book	Bana/Zaba	
2004	Mikveh	Elisheva	Beit Lessin Theater
2005	Sound of Music		
2014	The Greenhouse Live	herself	
2016	The Pillars of Society		Cameri Theatre
2017	The Crucible		Cameri Theatre
2018	God of Vengeance		Cameri Theatre
2020	The Intouchables		Cameri Theatre
2020	The End	Lili	
2021	The Seagull	Nina	Gesher Theater
2025	The Caucasian Chalk Circle	Grusha/Kanaadze	Habima Theater

== Awards ==
Year	Title	Prize	Category	Result
2017	Oboy	Israeli Television Academy Award	Best actress in youth series	Won
2018	Virgins	Tribeca Film Festival Award	Best actress in foreign language film	Won
2018	Virgins	Montenegro Film Festival	Best actress	Won
2023	Killer Influence	Festival International du Film Fantastique de Menton	Best actress	Won
2024	I'm not Okay (writer, director, main role)	TLVfest - Tel Aviv International LGBTQ+ Film Festival	Israeli short film competition Honorable mention	Won
