= List of Krovim Krovim episodes =

The following is an episode list for the Israeli sitcom Krovim Krovim.

== Series overview ==
| Season | Episodes | Originally aired | |
| Season | Episodes | Season premiere | Season finale |
|---|---|---|---|
| 1 | 13 | February 7, 1983 | ? |
| 2 | 10 | ? | ? |
| 3 | 18 | February 1986 | ? |
| Reunion Episode | 1 | March 24, 2005 | |

== Season 1: 1983 ==
| # | Title | Original Airdate |
|---|---|---|
| 1 | "Unification" (איחוד משפחות) | February 7, 1983 |
Yehoram's sister Tiki and her husband Ilan move into the building.
| 2 | "By the Vitek Rivers" (על נהרות ויטק) | ? |
The family deals with the municipality's decision to change their street name.
| 3 | "There Are No Words Left" (אין מילים) | ? |
While shopping at a local supermarket, Liora is interviewed for the evening news.
| 4 | "No Smoke" (אין עשן) | ? |
When Ilan is questioned by the police, the family tries to figure out the reason behind it.
| 5 | "Archimedes" (ארכימדס) | ? |
Yehoram discovers a way to streamline an industrial process at the plant where he works. When management rejects his idea, Ilan attempts to sell it to foreign companies.
| 6 | "Step Husband" (בעל חורג) | ? |
A mysterious guest named Mr. Gerstein (Avner Hezekiah) shows up at Ilan and Tiki's apartment asking questions about Hanna. Ilan suspects that Mr. Gerstein is an income tax officer.
| 7 | "Thief, Thief" (גנב, גנב) | ? |
After a burglar breaks into their apartment, Ilan and Tiki hire a specialist to install a new lock and bars on the windows. When the specialist offers a substantial discount for installing the same security measures throughout the building, Ilan tries to persuade the other tenants to agree.
| 8 | "Sub-Tenant" (דייר משנה) | ? |
After Ilan discovers that one of the tenants in their building is renting out a room, the family sets out to uncover which tenant is doing so.
| 9 | "Allowance" (דמי כיס) | ? |
The parents discover that the children have been washing cars in their spare time because they think their allowance isn't enough.
| 10 | "To Be Continued On Page Three" (המשך בעמוד שלוש) | ? |
Hanna prepares an article for the local newspaper about Yehoram and Tiki's family.
| 11 | "Second Show" (הצגה שנייה) | ? |
Muli lands the lead role in the school play "The Little Prince".
| 12 | "Yehoram's Independence Day" (יום העצמאות של יהורם) | ? |
Yehoram decides to take a year off.
| 13 | "A Star Is Born" (כוכב נולד) | ? |
After running into financial troubles, Hanna tries to solve her problems by following the advice from the daily astrology section in the newspaper.

== Season 2: 1984 ==
| # | Title | Original Airdate |
|---|---|---|
| 14 | "Love Story" (לאב סטורי) | ? |
After Hanna’s sub-tenant Doron (Doron Nesher) reveals that he has been receiving anonymous love letters, Hanna attempts to uncover the mysterious sender through an ambush.
| 15 | "What Did You Bring Me, Daddy?" (?אבא מה הבאת לי) | ? |
When Ilan returns from his vacation in London, Liora is upset because he didn’t bring back the perfume she had requested.
| 16 | "Only Selling" (מוכרים בלבד) | ? |
Yehoram struggles to part with several old objects that Liora wants to throw away.
| 17 | "The Car" (המכונית) | ? |
Ilan buys a car despite Yehoram's strong opposition.
| 18 | "War of the Worlds" (מלחמת העולמות) | ? |
Yehoram and Liora have a serious debate about how many times a day the begonia plant in their apartment should be watered.
| 19 | "Lets Talk Straight" (נדבר גלויות) | ? |
As part of a class assignment, Galia and Muli are tasked with writing about their family customs and traditions specific to their ethnoreligious group.
| 20 | "Withholding tax" (ניכוי במקור) | ? |
Yehoram discovers that he needs to pay an exceptionally high income tax. Hanna tries to find out the reason by confronting the tax clerk, which leads to a surprise visit from the clerk at Yehoram’s apartment.
| 21 | "Of Tov Hakol Tov" (עוף טוב הכול טוב) | ? |
Liora goes on a diet.
| 22 | "House Keeper" (עוזר בית) | ? |
Yehoram, Liora, Hanna, and Tiki hire a housekeeper.
| 23 | "From a Negative to a Positive" (מעז יצא מתוק) | ? |
Eviatar decide to become a vegan.
| 24 | "For The People" (לעזרת העם) | ? |
Tiki is away for several days on a work assignment, accompanying an influential U.S. senator during his visit to Israel. Later, the senator pays a visit to Tiki's apartment.
| 25 | "Unanimously" (פה אחד) | ? |
When the head of the condominium board (Shmuel Segal) threatens to resign, Yehoram runs for the position.

== Season 3: 1986 ==
| # | Title | Original air date |
|---|---|---|
| 26 | "Perfect" (פרפקט) | February 1986 |
Liora becomes depressed, and the family tries to help her overcome it.
| 27 | "A Package From America" (חבילה מאמריקה) | ? |
After Tiki and Ilan receive a very high electricity bill, Tiki decides to write a letter to her wealthy uncle Yehezkel (Yosef Shiloach), who lives in the United States.
| 28 | "Ongoing Maintenance" (אחזקה שוטפת) | ? |
The tenants are forced to deal with spending cuts on their condominium.
| 29 | "There Is No Happy Love" (אין אהבות שמחות) | ? |
Liora's charming ex-boyfriend Zvika (Yakov Yakovson) shows up at the public employment agency office where she works.
| 30 | "Crime and Punishment" (החטא ועונשו) | ? |
After Yehoram and Ilan are elected to the parent-teacher association at Muli and Galia's school, there is division about how the committee's funds should be used.
| 31 | "The Greatest Go To The Air Force" (הטובים לטיס) | ? |
Eviatar enlists in the Israeli Air Force.
| 32 | "Happy Birthday" (היום יום הולדת) | ? |
Ilan plans a surprise party for Tiki.
| 33 | "The Honor of the Family " (כבוד המשפחה) | ? |
Galia spends time with a male friend from school, leading to a series of misunderstandings.
| 34 | "Difficult Childhood" (ילדות קשה) | ? |
Yehoram visits psychologist Dr. Feinshmecker (Tuvia Tzafir). During a hypnosis session, Yehoram regresses to his 6-year-old self.
| 35 | "Healthy Mind" (נפש בריאה) | ? |
In a continuation of the previous episode, due to a mistake made by Liora, Yehoram remains hypnotized, believing he is 6 years old. With Dr. Feinshmecker abroad and unable to assist, no one can reverse the hypnotic effect. The situation worsens when Muli's teacher, Rivka (Rivka Michaeli), insists on meeting with Yehoram urgently.
| 36 | "Group Photo" (תמונה קבוצתית) | ? |
Uncle Yehezkel from the United States sends the family a home video camera and requests that they record a video of themselves and send it back to him as a souvenir.
| 37 | "What Is Certain" (מה שבטוח) | ? |
Ilan needs to close his insurance office.

== Reunion Episode: 2005 ==
| # | Title | Original Airdate |
|---|---|---|
| 38 | "Hamatzav Tzav" (המצב צב) | March 24, 2005 |
A new elevator is installed in the building, with all the residents contributing to its cost except Yehoram and Liora. Tiki expresses concern over Galia's single status and her desire for a grandchild. Ilan is convicted of share fraud and is sentenced to community service at a nursing home. Nevo's (Eviatar's son) turtle is accidentally frozen, leading Tiki to order a replacement, only to later find out that the original turtle had been dead for over two years. Yehoram and Liora lose their jobs and keep it a secret from each other. When the truth emerges, they decide to enjoy their retirement by traveling the world but need the money they had invested with Ilan. It is revealed that this money was used to help pay for the elevator. Ultimately, Hanna comes to the rescue by writing Yehoram and Liora a check from the profits of a successful ringtone she sold.
