= Angeliki Papoulia =

Greek actress

- Αγγελική Παπούλια
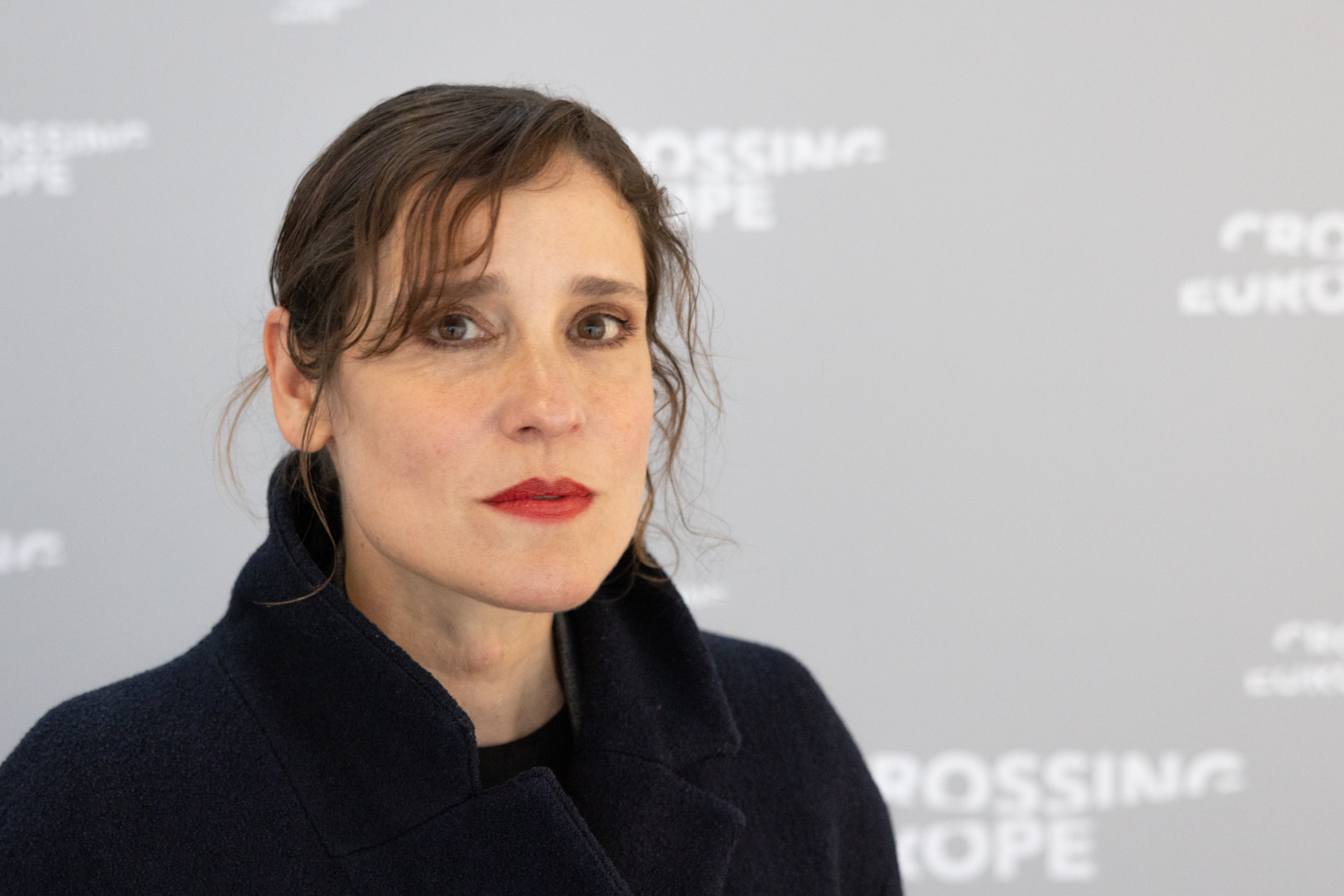
- Papoulia in 2023
- Born: 1975 (age 50–51); Athens, Greece
- Occupations: Actress; theatre director

Angeliki Papoulia (Greek: Αγγελική Παπούλια; born 1975) is a Greek actress and theatre director. In film, she is most notable for her roles in Dogtooth, Alps and The Lobster by Yorgos Lanthimos, and A Blast and The Miracle of the Sargasso Sea by Syllas Tzoumerkas. For her part in Dogtooth she was awarded with a Heart of Sarajevo for Best Actress (together with Mary Tsoni).

== Life and career ==
Papoulia was born in 1975 in Athens, Greece. She graduated from the Embros drama school. Right after her graduation she collaborated with Greek theatre directors Michail Marmarinos, Lefteris Voyatzis and Yannis Houvardas in various performances, most notably National Anthem', School of Women, and Romeo and Juliet.

In 2004, Papoulia founded with fellow actors Christos Passalis and Yorgos Valais the blitz theatre group. Since then, she co-directed, co-written and acted in all of the group's performances in Athens and across Europe: Motherland (Bios theatre, Athens), Joy Division (Bios theatre, Athens), New Order (Bios theatre, Athens), Faust (National Theatre of Greece), Katerini (Athens and Epidaurus Festival), Guns! Guns! Guns! (National Theatre of Greece), Cinemascope (Athens and Epidaurus Festival and Bios theatre, Athens), Galaxy (Michalis Cacoyannis Institute, Athens & Schaubuhne, Berlin), Don Quixote (Athens & Epidaurus Festival), Late Night (Onassis Cultural Center and La Filature), Vanya - Ten years After (Technis theatre in co-production with La Comédie de Reims and Théâtre Dijon-Bourgogne), 6am How To Disappear Completely (Onassis Cultural Center in co-production with Sao Luiz Teatro Municipal, Lisbon, La Filature, La Comédie De Reims, Théâtre De La Ville - Paris, Nouveau Théâtre De Montreuil, Ligne Directe - Paris and Festival d' Avignon).

One of the most celebrated Greek theatre ensembles, the blitz theatre group define their basic principles as following: "theatre is a field where people meet each other and exchange ideas in the most essential way, not a field for virtuosity and ready made truths. There is a need for answers to what society asks from art today and what theatrical structures stand for in the dawn of the 21st century. All members are equal throughout conception, writing, direction and dramaturgy process, everything is under doubt, there is nothing to be taken for granted, neither in theatre nor in life."

Parallel to her theater work, Papoulia started her film acting career with short films and a minor part in feature film Alexandreia by Maria Iliiou. In 2002, she appeared in Yannis Economidis' debut film Matchbox in the part of "Kiki".

In 2008, Papoulia had the leading part of 'Older Daughter' in Yorgos Lanthimos' Oscar nominated and Cannes film festival awarded Dogtooth. Her collaboration with Lanthimos continued in his next film Alps that was awarded with the Best Screenplay Award at the Venice International Film Festival. In 2014, Papoulia had the leading part of 'Maria' in Syllas Tzoumerkas' A Blast which premiered at the Locarno International Film Festival. In 2015, she appeared as the 'Heartless Woman' in Yorgos Lanthimos' Cannes awarded and Oscar nominated The Lobster. In 2019, her second collaboration with Tzoumerkas, thriller The Miracle of the Sargasso Sea premiered at the 69th Berlin International Film Festival. For her performances in these five films, Angeliki Papoulia was widely praised by the international press, with Der Spiegel calling her "one of the most fearless European actresses working today'.

In 2016, Papoulia was a member of the Locarno International Film Festival Pardi di domani Jury and of the Sarajevo International Film Festival Competition Jury.

== Pledge ==
In September 2025, she signed an open pledge with Film Workers for Palestine pledging not to work with Israeli film institutions "that are implicated in genocide and apartheid against the Palestinian people."

== Filmography ==
=== Film ===
Year	Title	Role	Notes
2002	Matchbox	Kiki	—N/a
2008	Well Kept Secrets, Athanassia	Georgia	—N/a
2009	Dogtooth	Older daughter	—N/a
2011	Alps	Nurse	—N/a
2014	A Blast	Maria	—N/a
2015	The Lobster	Heartless Woman	—N/a
2018	Pity	Woman at Hospital	—N/a
2019	The Miracle of the Sargasso Sea	Elisabeth	—N/a
2020	Amulet	Miriam	Sundance Film Festival
2020	Green Sea	Anna	—N/a
2021	Cryptozoo	Phoebe (voice)	Sundance Film Festival
2021	Patchwork	Chara	—N/a
2021	Oeil oignon		—N/a
2022	A Little Love Package	Angeliki	—N/a
2022	Isyhia 6-9		—N/a
2022	I poli kai i poli	Sarina	—N/a
2022	Human Flowers of Flesh	Ida	—N/a
2022	Cavewoman	Cavewoman	—N/a
2023	I mitera mou eine agia		Short film
2023	Touched		—N/a
2023	Voices in Deep	Gloria	—N/a
2023	Shooting Blanks	Christina	—N/a
2024	Arcadia	Katerina	World Premiere at the 74th Berlin International Film Festival
2024	The Strangers' Case	Helena	—N/a
2024	To a Land Unknown	Tatiana	—N/a
2026	Brave New Love		

=== Television ===
Year	Title	Role
2017	The Tunnel	Lana Khasanović

== Theatre work ==
Angeliki Papoulia theatre work
Year	Title	Director	Theatre
2001	National Hymn	Michael Marmarinos	Theseum Theatre
2004	Romeo and Juliet	Michael Marmarinos	Theseum Theatre
2004	L' Ecole des femmes	Lefteris Vogiatzis	Nea Skini Theatre
2006	Motherland	blitz theatre group	BIOS cultural center / Giessen, Germany / Aix-en-Provence France
2007	Joy Division / New Order	blitz theatre group	BIOS cultural center
2008	Bossa Nova	Konstantinos Rigos	National Theatre of Greece
2008	Tales from the Vienna Woods	Yiannis Houvardas	Athens & Epidaurus Festival – National Theatre of Greece
2009	The House	blitz theatre group	Athens, Agisilaou 90, Greece
2009	Faust	co-dir. blitz theatre group	National Theatre of Greece
2009	Katerini	co-dir. blitz theatre group	Athens & Epidaurus Festival - BIOS cultural center
2009	Guns! Guns! Guns!	blitz theatre group	National Theatre of Greece / Theatre de la Ville - Paris, France, 2011 / Theatre Le Volcan - Le Havre, France 2012 / Theatre Dijon Bourgogne - Parvis Saint-Jean, France 2013 / Le Trident - Scene National de Cherbourg, France 2014
2010	CINEMASCOPE	blitz theatre group	Athens & Epidaurus Festival - BIOS cultural center
2011	Galaxy	blitz theatre group	Michael Cacoyiannis Foundation
2011	Platonov	Yorgos Lanthimos	National Theatre of Greece
2012	Don Quixote, the Death of Romance	blitz theatre group	Athens and Epidaurus Festival, Greece / Reims Scenes d'Europe Festival, France 2012 / Thalia Theater, Hamburg, Germany 2013 / Theatre Liberte, Toulon 2014 / Les Nuits de Furviere, Lyon, France 2014
2012	Galaxy	blitz theatre group	F.I.N.D. Festival Schaubuhne Theatre, Berlin, Germany
2012	Late Night	blitz theatre group	Onassis Cultural Centre, Athens, Greece 2012 La Manufacture Atlantique, Bordeaux, France 2012 / Festival RING, Nancy, France 2012 / Reims, Scenes d'Europe Festival, France 2012 / La Filature - Scene Nationale, Mulhouse France 2012 / Theater Kikker, Utrecht, the Netherlands 2013 / Festival Theaterformen in Hannover, Germany 2013 / Theatre d'Arles, France 2013 / Theatro Stabile dell' Umbria, Solomeo, Italy 2013 / Theatre du Nord, Lille, France 2013 / Nouveau Theatre de Montreuil, Paris, France 2013 / Bozar Theatre in Brussels, Belgium 2014 / Le Trident - Scene National de Cherbourg, France 2014 / Le Maillon - Theatre de Strasbourg, France 2014 / Apollo Theater Siegen, Germany 2014 / Chateauvallon – Scene Nationale, France 2014 / Hessisches Staatstheater, Wiesbaden, Germany 2014 / Les Nuits de Furviere, Lyon, France 2014 / Thalia Theater, Hamburg, Germany 2015 / Les scenes du Jura - Scene Nationale, France 2015 / Theatre Dijon, Bourgogne, France 2015 / Home Works Festival, Beirut, Lebanon 2015 / Kenter Theatre, Istanbul, Turkey 2016 / Kunstlerhaus Mousontrum, Frankfurt 2016 / Barbican, London LIFT Festival, UK 2016 / Napoli Theatro Festival, Italy 2016 / Bastard Festival, Trondheim, Norway 2016 / Festival Prapremier, Bydgoszcz, Poland 2016 / Steirischer Herbst, Graz, Austria 2016 / Theatre Garonne, Toulouse, France 2016 / Le Parvis Tarbes, France 2016 / AUAWIRLEBEN Theatre Festival Bern, Switzerland 2017 / Theater Der Jungen Welt Leipzig, Germany 2017 / Le Merlan, Marseille France 2017 / Festival Iberoamericano de Teatro, Bogota Colombia 2018 / Teatro Astra - Festival delle Colline Torinesi, Torino Italy 2018 / Hellerau - Europäisches Zentrum der Künste Dresden, Germany 2018 / Teatro Municipal do Porto, Porto Portugal 2018 / The Atrium - International Theatre Festival in Klaipeda, Klaipeda, Lithuania 2019
2013	The Terrorist Ballroom	blitz theatre group	F.I.N.D. Festival Schaubuhne Theatre, Berlin, Germany
2014	Galaxy	blitz theatre group	Reims, Scenes d'Europe Festival, 2014 France / Nouveau Theatre de Montreuil, Paris, 2014 France / Fondation Cartier Pour L'Art Contemporain, Paris, France 2014
2014	Vanya. Ten Years After	blitz theatre group	Theatro Technis, Athens, Greece / Theatre Dijon Bourgogne, France 2015 / Reims, Scenes d'Europe Festival, France 2016 / Festival delle Colline Torinesi, Torino, Italy 2016
2016	Galaxy	blitz theatre group	Frascati Theater Amsterdam, the Netherlands, 2016
2016	6am How to disappear completely	blitz theatre group	Onassis Cultural Center, Athens, Greece / Reims, Scenes d'Europe Festival, France 2016 / La Filature - Scene Nationale, Mulhouse, France 2016 / Festival d'Avignon, Avignon, France 2016 / São Luiz Municipal Theatre, Lisbon, Portugal 2016 / Théâtre de la Ville - Nouveau Théâtre de Montreuil, Paris, France 2017
2017	The Institute of Global Loneliness	blitz theatre group	Athens and Epidaurus Festival 2017 CULTURESCAPES 2017, Kaserne Basel, Switzerland 2017 / Festival Scènes d' Europe, Reims, France 2018 / Theater im Pfalzbau, Ludwigshafen, Germany 2018
2018	Rob	Dimitris Karantzas	Onnassis Cultural Center / Le Lieu Unique Nantes France 2019
2019	Alcestis	Angeliki Papoulia	Luzerner Theater – Luzern, Switzerland
2019	The Visit of the Old Lady	Christos Passalis	Luzerner Theater – Luzern, Switzerland

== Awards and nominations ==
Year	Award	Category	Nominated work	Result	Ref.
2009	Sarajevo Film Festival	Best Actress	Dogtooth	Won. (Note: Shared with Mary Tsoni)	
2010	Hellenic Film Academy Awards	Best Actress	Dogtooth	Nominated	
2015	Hellenic Film Academy Awards	Best Actress	A Blast	Nominated	
2020	Hellenic Film Academy Awards	Best Actress	The Miracle of the Sargasso Sea	Won	
2020	Los Angeles Greek Film Festival	Best Performance	The Miracle of the Sargasso Sea	Nominated	
2021	Los Angeles Greek Film Festival	Best Performance	Green Sea	Nominated	
2022	Cyprus Film Days International Festival	Best Actress	Patchwork	Won	
2022	Hellenic Film Academy Awards	Best Actress	Patchwork	Nominated	
2022	Los Angeles Greek Film Festival	Best Performance	Patchwork	Won	
