= Krovim Krovim =

1980s Israeli television sitcom

- קרובים קרובים
- Genre: Sitcom
- Created by: Ephraim Sidon; B. Michael
- Directed by: Yitzchak Shauli
- Starring: Hanna Meron; Yehoram Gaon; Liora Rivlin; Tiki Dayan; Ilan Dar; Muli Segev; Moshe Gershoni; Natalie Meirovitch; Galia Kedem
- Theme music composer: Nurit Hirsch
- Country of origin: Israel
- Original language: Hebrew
- No. of seasons: 3
- No. of episodes: 38 (including the reunion episode) (list of episodes)

Production
- Running time: 30 minutes

Original release
- Network: Israeli Educational Television
- Release: 7 February 1983 – 24 May 1986; Reunion episode: 24 March 2005

Krovim Krovim (Hebrew: קְרוֹבִים קְרוֹבִים; lit. Close Relatives/Near Ones, Dear Ones) is an Israeli television sitcom created by Ephraim Sidon and B. Michael. The series originally aired on Israeli Educational Television from 1983 to 1986. It is considered to be the first Israeli sitcom.

The series focuses on an extended Jewish Israeli family that shares a residential apartment building in the center of Tel Aviv.

The opening tune of the series was composed by Nurit Hirsch.

== Synopsis ==
The series focuses on an extended middle-class Hiloni family that lives in three apartments in an apartment building in the center of Tel Aviv-Yafo. Tiki and her husband Ilan live with their daughter Galia on the third floor. Tiki's brother Yehoram lives with his wife Liora and their three children (Eviatar, Efrat and Molly) on the second floor. Tiki and Yehoram's aunt Hannah lives on the first floor.

Episodes addressed everyday family situations and socio-political issues including school plays, the Israeli Air Force Flight Academy, vegetarianism, astrology, elections for the condominium board, burglary, birthday celebrations, inflation, Israel–United States relations, hiring an Israeli Arab housekeeper, Mizrahi-Ashkenazi relations, and interfaith marriage.

== Cast ==
=== Main characters ===
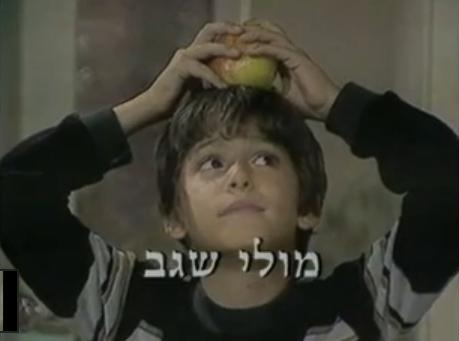
Muli Segev as Muli

Most of the characters in the series were called by the first names of the actors. The last names of the main characters was never revealed.

- Hanna (Hanna Maron) – Tiki and Yehoram's aunt who lives on the first floor of the family's building. Witty, energetic, and open to new experiences, she frequently comes up with clever and amusing ideas. She talks to her plants to alleviate boredom, and her distinctive response of "Open!" when the doorbell rings became one of the series' hallmarks.
- Yehoram (Yehoram Gaon) – Leora's husband, Tiki's brother, Hanna's nephew, and the father of Eviatar, Efrat and Muli. He works as a mechanical engineer. Yehoram is a hypochondriac who suffers from various chronic illnesses including depression. He has extensive knowledge of medicines and healing methods.
- Leora (Liora Rivlin) – Yehoram's wife and the mother of Eviatar, Efrat and Muli. Leora works at a public employment agency. She is portrayed as pessimistic, uptight and cynical and is a habitual cigarette smoker.
- Ilan (Ilan Dar) – Tiki's husband and Galia's father. Ilan works as an insurance agent. Often portrayed as stingy and manipulative, he frequently devises sophisticated get-rich-quick schemes. However, Ilan is at other times portrayed to be rational and a voice of reason.
- Tiki (Tiki Dayan) – Ilan's wife, Yehoram's sister, Hanna's niece, and Galia's mother. She works as a tour guide. Energetic, lively and practical, Tiki is known for having lengthy phone conversations.
- Eviatar (Moshe Gershoni) – Leora and Yehoram's oldest child. During the series, he enlists in the Israel Defense Forces. He attempts to join the Israel Air Force but is rejected.
- Efrat (Natalie Mairovich) – Yehoram and Leora's middle child and only daughter.
- Muli (Muli Segev) – Yehoram and Leora's youngest son.
- Galia (Galia Kedem) – Ilan and Tiki's daughter, an only child.

=== Recurring characters ===
- Mr. Kuzilewicz (Shmuel Segal) – Chairman of the condominium association.
- Doron (Doron Nesher) – Hanna's sub-tenant.

== History ==
The original concept was to produce a comedy series for the Israeli Educational Television focusing on parent-children relationships. Before production commenced, the show's working title was "The Family" (המשפחה). In an interview with Modi Bar-On, Yitzhak Shauli, the program's director, stated that he and producer Risha Tierman decided to create an Israeli sitcom, they traveled to the United States to observe the filming of a "Three's Company" episode and learn about the directing and production process of a successful sitcom. Despite developing concerns that conditions in the Israeli television industry were not as favorable, they decided to proceed with producing the program.

The building featured in the show as "Vitek 9", is fictional. The building shown in the opening sequence is located in the area of Rothschild Boulevard and Hasmonean Street in Tel Aviv-Yafo. The building became a well-known landmark due to the show's popularity. The name "Vitek" is a tribute to Risha Tierman's husband who died a few months before production began. The number 9 represents the 9 family members featured in the program (Hanna, Yehoram, Leora, Eviatar, Efrat, Molly, Tiki, Ilan and Galia).

=== Broadcast history ===
Produced by Israeli Educational Television, the series originally aired in an evening time slot on Israeli Channel 1. The first season ran between February and May in 1983 (first season), 1984 (second season), and 1986 (third season). Reruns would be aired in an afternoon time slot from July and October.

Since its original broadcast, the series has been frequently rerun, mainly on the Israeli Channel 23.

=== Reunion episode ===
In the early 2000s, Yehoram Gaon was asked on an Israeli Army Radio programme why a reunion episode had not been produced. The radio hosts campaigned for a reunion episode and gained the support of most of the original cast. Yaffa Vigodsky, the CEO of the Israeli Educational Television (which retains the rights to the series) agreed and the Discount Bank agreed to finance the production. The script was written by Ephraim Sidon. The reunion episode, titled "Hamatzav Tzav", was filmed at Israeli Educational Television studios in front of a live audience on November 11, 2004 and was broadcast on Israeli Channel 2 on March 24, 2005.

The reunion episode featured Tom Gal, who played Eviatar's son Nevo, and Sivan Sasson, who played Galia as Galia Kedem retired from acting. Muli Segev chose not to participate.

=== DVD ===
On June 7, 2009, a DVD box set of the series was released containing all 37 episodes, the reunion episode, and a documentary about the reunion's production.
