= Syllas Tzoumerkas =

Greek film director, screenwriter, actor

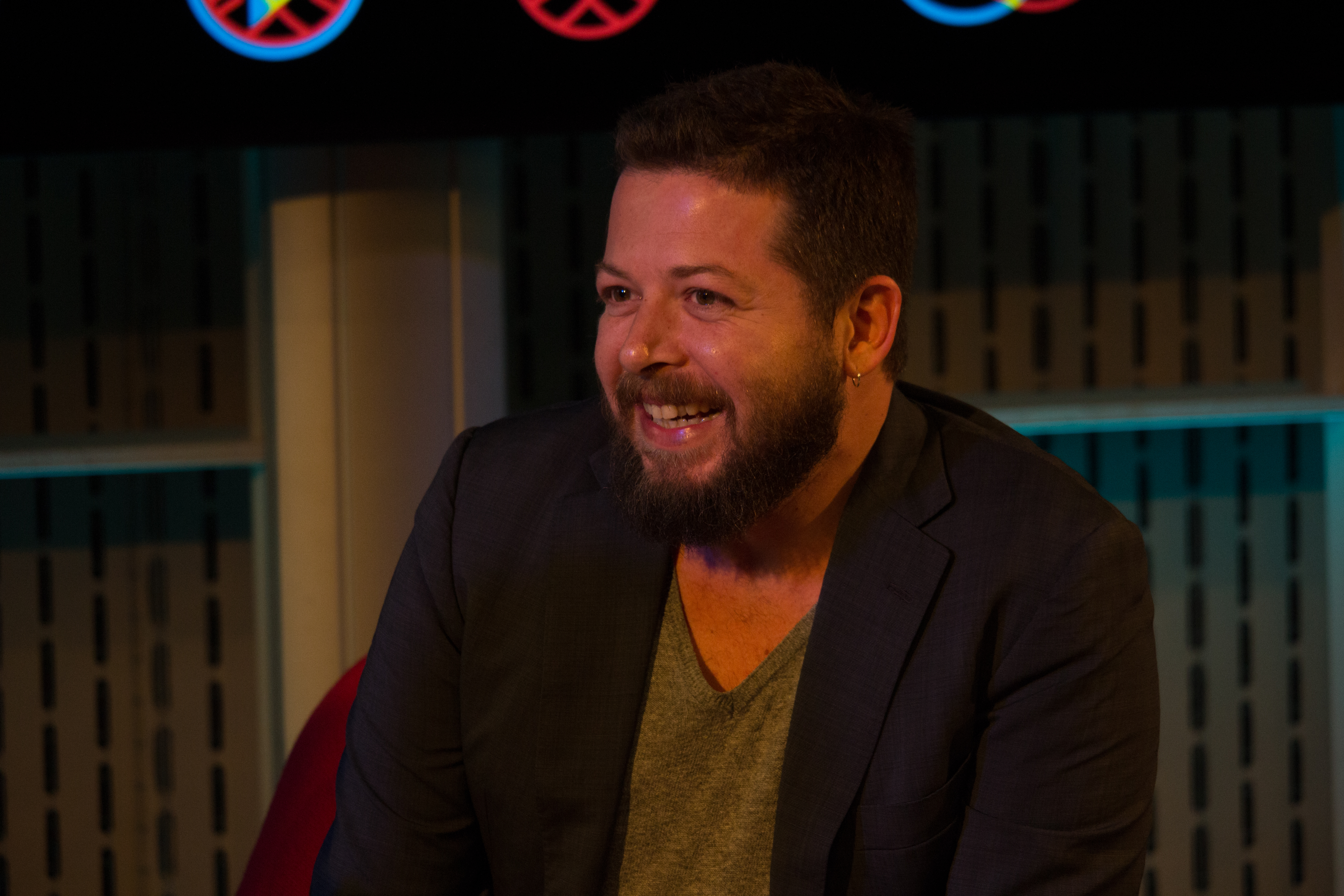
- Tzoumerkas in 2015
- Born: January 1, 1978 (age 48); Thessaloniki, Greece
- Occupation: Film director
- Years active: 2000–present

Syllas Tzoumerkas (Greek: Σύλλας Τζουμέρκας; born 1 January 1978) is a Greek film director, screenwriter, and actor.

== Life and early work ==
Syllas Tzoumerkas was born in Thessaloniki. He studied theatre and directing for Film and Television at the L.Stavrakos Film School and the University of Athens.

In 2000, he directed the short film The Devouring Eyes (Ta Matia Pou Trone) that was selected by the Cinéfondation of the 2001 Cannes Film Festival and won the Jury Prize at the 2001 Karlovy Vary International Film Festival.

== Film ==
Tzoumerkas' first feature film Homeland (Hora Proelefsis) had its world première at the International Critics' Week of the 67th Venice International Film Festival, in 2010. Homeland participated in several international film festivals and won 5 Awards of the Hellenic Film Academy (Best first film director, supporting role actress for Ioanna Tsirigouli, original music, editing and make-up).

The script for his second feature film A Blast won the Eurimages Co-production Award at the Cinelink co-production market of the 2012 Sarajevo film festival. A Blast', a Greek-German-Dutch-Italian co-production had its world premiere at the International Competition of the Locarno Film Festival 2014. The film was consequently presented in many international film festivals, most notably Sarajevo international film festival (regional premiere), BFI London Film Festival (Dare), São Paulo International Film Festival (Competition New Directors), Rotterdam International Film Festival 2015 (Limelight), among others. It was theatrically released in several countries (Greece, Germany, Italy, Holland, Poland, Denmark, Australia, etc.) and was picked up for VOD and DVD release in the United States by Indiepix Films. In the international press, the critical reception of the film varied from great and mostly favourable reviews in Screen Daily, Indiewire, The Hollywood Reporter, Der Spiegel to mixed in Variety and negative in We Got this Covered.

Syllas Tzoumerkas participated with the essay short film A Manifesto for the Un-Communal, in the omnibus documentary feature Out-of-Place, a German-Israeli production, recipient of the Shimon-Peres Prize 2018. A Manifesto for the Un-Communal had its world premiere as an individual short film at the Locarno International Film Festival 2017 (Out of Competition).

In 2019, Syllas Tzoumerkas presented his third feature at the Berlin International Film Festival (Panorama). The Miracle of the Sargasso Sea, a co-production of Greece, Germany, Holland and Sweden, a crime thriller with horror and surrealist undertones, had its premiere at the Zoo Palast. It was nominated for the Panorama Award and the Teddy Award and New Europe Film Sales announced its release in a series of territories within 2019 and its participation in several consequent international film festivals (Beaune International Thriller Festival, Istanbul IFF, BiFan International Fantastic Film Festival, etc.). Critical response was mostly favourable, with Guardian's Peter Bradshaw giving the film 3/5 stars while calling it "a Lynchian psychodrama in the sun" and Savina Petkova of Electric Ghost Magazine giving the film 5/5 stars, writing that "while the film is saturated with Biblical quotes, icons of saints, and church choir songs, its form attends equally to the lowly human, animal, and nature." The Hollywood Reporter, Screen International and Variety praised the film the direction, the bold characters, the imagery and the unflinching performances by Angeliki Papoulia and Youla Boudali, while criticising elements of the script's narrative construction.

In 2020, The Miracle of the Sargasso Sea was nominated for 12 Hellenic Film Academy Awards, winning two (Best Director for Syllas Tzoumerkas and Best Actress for Angeliki Papoulia).

As an actor, Syllas Tzoumerkas participated in feature films Wasted Youth (2011) by Argyris Papadimitropoulos and Jan Vogel (Rotterdam International Film Festival) and The Eternal Return of Antonis Paraskevas (2013) by Elina Psykou (Berlin International Film Festival).

In 2016, Syllas Tzoumerkas co-signed the script and appeared as an actor in Argyris Papadimitropoulos' film Suntan (Rotterdam International Film Festival 2016, SXSW 2016, Best International Film - Edinburgh International Film Festival). Argyris Papadimitropoulos and Syllas Tzoumerkas won the Best Screenplay Award of the FEST International Film Festival and the 2017 Hellenic Film Academy Award for Best Screenplay.

In 2019, he co-signed with Ahmad Ghossein and Abla Khoury, the script of Ahmad Ghossein's feature film All This Victory. All This Victory, a co-production of Lebanon, France and Qatar, premiered in Venice Critics' Week 2019, where it was awarded with the Audience Award.

In 2020, he appeared as an actor in Argyris Papadimitropoulos' feature film Monday, in the part of Manos.

== Filmography ==
Year	Title	Notes
2000	The Devouring Eyes	(short film), director, writer, actor, producer Nominated - Cinéfondation Award - Cannes 2001 Winner - Jury Prize - Karlovy Vary 2001
2000	All Souls' Day	(short film), co-writer
2002	Rain	(short film), director, writer
2010	Hora Proelefsis	Director, co-writer, producer Nominated - Luigi de Laurentis Award (67th Venice International Film Festival); Nominated - International Critics' Week Award (67th Venice International Film Festival); Hellenic Film Academy Award for Best First Film Director; First film director award (Athens Film Festival); Nominated - Grand Jury Prize (New Horizons Film Festival); Nominated - Grand Prix (Voices International Film Festival)
2011	Wasted Youth	Actor
2013	The Eternal Return of Antonis Paraskevas	Actor
2014	A Blast	Director, co-writer, executive producer Nominated - Pardo d' Oro (Golden Leopard) (Locarno International Film Festival); Nominated - Heart of Sarajevo (Sarajevo International Film Festival); Nominated - Art Cinema Award (Hamburg Filmfest); Nominated - International Jury Award (São Paulo IFF); Nominated - Golden Angel (TOFIFEST, Torun IFF)
2016	Suntan	Co-writer, actor Hellenic Film Academy Award for Best Screenplay, with Argyris Papadimitropoulos; Best Screenplay Award - FEST Film Festival
2017	A Manifesto for the Un-Communal	(short film), director, writer, director of photography
2019	The Miracle of the Sargasso Sea	Director, co-writer, executive producer Nominated - Panorama Award (Berlin International Film Festival); Nominated - Teddy Award (Berlin International Film Festival); Nominated - Sang Neuf Award (Beaune International Thriller Festival); Hellenic Film Academy Award for Best Director
2019	All This Victory	Co-writer
2020	Monday	Actor

== Theatre ==
Syllas Tzoumerkas' theatre work includes stage performances Debate (Bios theatre, Diaspora theatre group, 2011) and High and Low - A Murderer in Tokyo (Onassis Cultural Centre, Diaspora theatre group), both co-directed with Youla Boudali. In 2015, he participated at the Onassis Cultural Centre's production of the omnibus performance X-Apartments - Athens (concept by Matthias Lilienthal, curated by Katia Arfara and Anna Mülter), with the segment Α Farewell to the Traitor from a Lower-Middle-Class House in Larissa Station, Athens (based on a letter by Flavius Philostratus, 3rd Century A.D.)

- 2010 Cinemascope by the Blitz, (actor), Bios theatre, Athens and Epidaurus Festival (Athens)
- 2008 War is War by the Erasers (actor), No Central (Athens)
- 2012 Debate (co-written and co-directed by Youla Boudali, actor), Bios Theatre (Athens)
- 2015 X-Apartments, Athens - Α Farewell to the Traitor from a Lower-Middle-Class House in Larissa Station, Athens (based on a letter by Flavius Philostratus, 3rd Century A.D.), Onassis Cultural Centre (Athens)'
- 2016 High and Low, A Murderer in Tokyo (co-written and co-directed by Youla Boudali), Onassis Cultural Center (Athens)
- 2019 Tobacco Fields V1 (co-written and co-directed by Youla Boudali), Prosorinos theatre (Athens)

== Curator ==
Elina Psykou and Syllas Tzoumerkas co-curated with Afroditi Nikolaidou and Dimitris Papanikolaou Motherland, I See You - the 20th Century of Greek Cinema, the restoration program and moving festival of the Hellenic Film Academy. The program had its premiere at the Athens Epidaurus Festival in September 2021.
