= Chartzufim =

Israeli television series

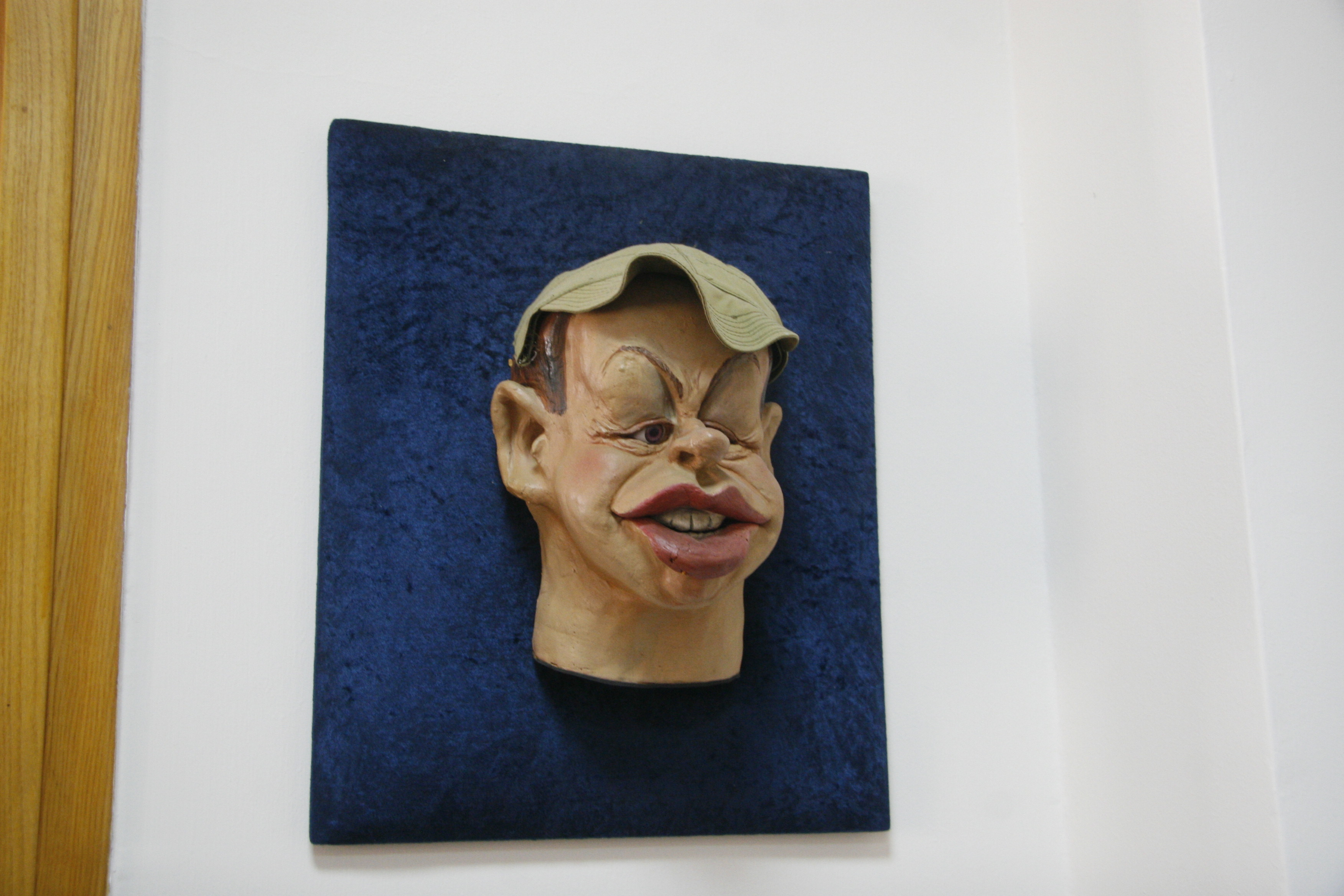
- Natan Sharansky by Chartzufim
- Genre: Political satire Shock value
- Directed by: Yoav Tzafir, Yoram Zak, Avi Cohen, Yariv Horowitz, Ron Nino, Dror Sabo
- Voices of: Tuvia Tzafir; Sarit Sari; Tomer Sharon; Hannan Ladderman; Tzlil Biran; Avri Gilad; Yoav Tzafir; Dor Zweigenboim
- Country of origin: Israel
- No. of series: 5
- No. of episodes: 130

Production
- Producer: Telad
- Running time: 30 minutes

Original release
- Network: Arutz 2 Kan 11
- Release: 1996 – 2001

Chartzufim or HaChartzufim (Hebrew: החרצופים; a portmanteau made from the words Partzufim, faces, and Chatzufim, audacious) was an Israeli political satire television programme in the vein of Britain's Spitting Image. It ran from 1996 to 2001 on Channel 2.

In 2023, Kan 11 was evaluating the possibility to relaunch the program.

== Staff ==
- Directors: Yoav Tzafir, Yoram Zak, Avi Cohen, Yariv Horowitz, Ron Nino, Dror Sabo
- Created By: Ephraim Sidon
- Puppets Designers: Itzik and Ilana Yahav
- Puppeteers: Ilan Savir, Ofira Archoni, Gilles Ben David
- Voices: Tuvia Tzafir, Sarit Sari, Tomer Sharon, Hannan Ladderman, Tzlil Biran, Avri Gilad, Yoav Tzafir, Dor Zweigenboim
