= Ilana Yahav =

Israeli sand animation artist

- אילנה יהב
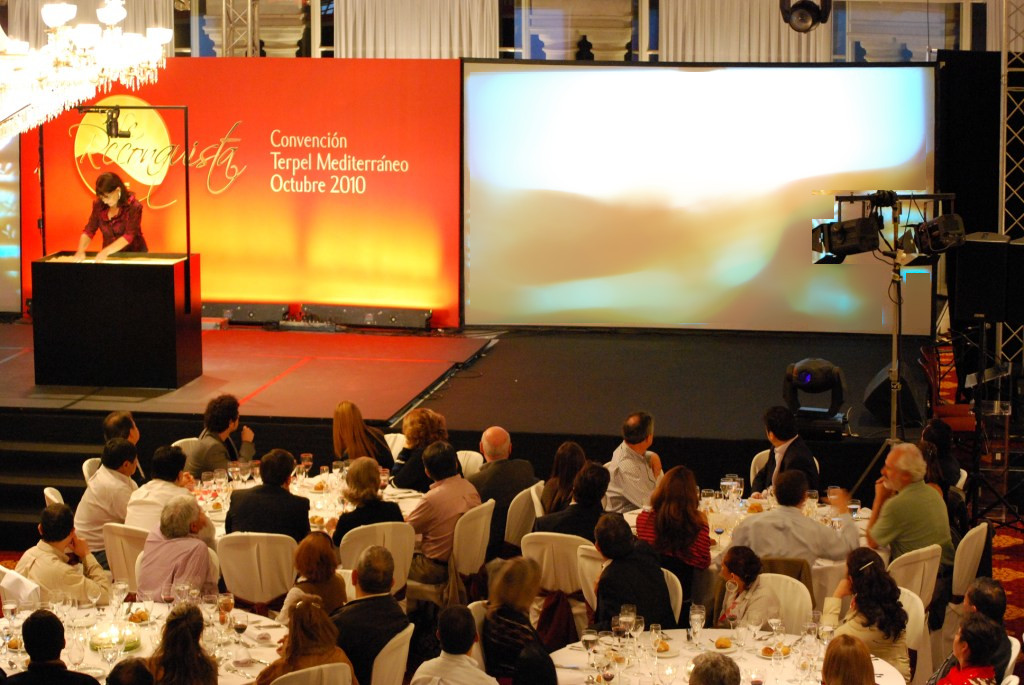
- Ilana Yahav performing in 2010
- Born: Israel
- Occupation: Artist
- Website: sandfantasy.com

Ilana Yahav (Hebrew: אילנה יהב) is a sand animation performance artist and puppeteer from Israel. She has performed in front of live audiences, in video clips and in advertisements.

== Career ==
Yahav studied sand art in Hollywood, New York and London. She later ran a studio which created realistic latex puppets, specializing in special effects for movie productions and advertisements. During this time she created puppets for a political satire program on Israeli television called Chartzufim, based on the British show Spitting Image. Yahav has performed at the Kremlin, as well as before the King of Spain, and the King of Belgium.

== Sand art performances ==
Each performance requires lengthy preparations beginning with numerous sketches and experiments on the sand table itself. The creation generally undergoes extensive changes until the final version is crystallized. During the performances, Yahav uses her hands to create images in sand on a transparent back-lit table, while a video camera positioned above her displays the emerging creation on a screen in real-time. Music and light form important elements of Yahav's creations. Lights emerge from under the transparent table and a soundtrack plays which has been selected by her to convey specific messages and sensations. Original music is sometimes composed and produced especially for this purpose.

In 2018, Yahav became a contestant on Israel's Got Talent.
