= Virgins (2018 film) =

2018 French-Israeli film

- אין בתולות בקריות; Vierges
- Directed by: Keren Ben Rafael
- Written by: Keren Ben Rafael; Élise Benroubi
- Produced by: Caroline Bonmarchand; Moshe Edery
- Starring: Joy Rieger; Michael Aloni; Evgenia Dodina; Manuel Elkaslassy
- Cinematography: Damien Dufresne
- Edited by: Daniel Avitzur; Frédéric Baillehaiche
- Music by: Renaud Mayeur
- Distributed by: United King Films (Israel)
- Release dates: 25 July 2018 (France); 8 November 2018 (Israel)
- Running time: 90 minutes
- Countries: France; Israel; Belgium
- Languages: Hebrew; Russian
- Budget: $1.13 million

Virgins (Hebrew: אין בתולות בקריות, French: Vierges) is a 2018 French-Israeli drama film and the feature-length directorial debut of Keren Ben Rafael. The film stars Joy Rieger, Michael Aloni and Evgenia Dodina. It centres on a rebellious teenager, Lena (Rieger), dissatisfied with the monotony of her life in Kiryat Yam and always battling her Russian mother, Irena (Dodina). Lena becomes quickly interested by the arrival of a handsome writer (Aloni), reporting on an alleged mermaid sighting in the beach community.

The film received its world premiere at the Tribeca Film Festival on 18 April 2018, before its Israeli premiere at the Jerusalem Film Festival on 30 July. Rieger won the Best Actress Award at Tribeca and the film received five Ophir Award nominations, including Best Actress (Rieger), Best Supporting Actor (Aloni) and Best Supporting Actress (Dodina).

== Plot summary ==
Lena (Rieger) is a disaffected and rebellious 16-year-old, desperate to escape the monotony of her life in Kiryat Yam, a run-down beach town. She dreams of parties and independence in Tel Aviv. She constantly battles her mother, Irena (Dodina), a Russian immigrant, whose once-popular beach bar and cafe is now mostly deserted and riddled with debts.

Lena quickly becomes interested by the arrival of an attractive Haaretz writer, Tchipi (Aloni). His Haaretz column on a reported mermaid causes a sensation in the otherwise staid beach community. In a media blitz, the town's mayor, Shmuel (Siso), who is also Irena's lover, offers $1 million for proof of a mermaid.

=== Title ===
The title of the film references protagonist, Lena, a sixteen-year-old virgin. Further, the Hebrew-language word for mermaid directly translates as "virgin of the sea."

== Cast ==
- Joy Rieger as Lena, a rebellious teen that prefers to go by "Lana"
- Michael Aloni as Tchipi, an older, attractive Tel Aviv journalist that writes for Haaretz
- Evgenia Dodina as Irena, Lena's Russian mother, who runs and owns a beach bar in Kiryat Yam. She made aliyah from Moscow to Kiryat Yam with her parents. Dodina also plays the role of a famous actress that arrives in the town.
- Manuel Elkaslassy as Tamar, Lena's cousin from Jerusalem, who comes to stay with the family. Her mother, Irena's sister, died four years ago, and her father is more interested in his new girlfriend than his daughter.
- Alon Hamawi as Lifeguard
- Rami Heuberger as Shmuel Siso, mayor of Kiryat Yam, he is married and having an affair with Irena.

== Production ==
The film was developed by the Sam Spiegel International Film Lab during a 7-month seminar period and supervised by script editor, Avi Nesher.

The idea for the film was drawn from a real-life event in Kiryat Yam, where an alleged mermaid sighting in 2009 received significant media attention. The beach community that had largely been abandoned by tourists, suddenly attracted a surge in interest and tourism.

Ben Rafael penned the script with Élise Benroubi, a classmate she had befriended when they were both studying at La Fémis in Paris. Ben Rafael's husband, Damien Dufresne, was enlisted as cinematographer.

Ben Rafael and Benroubi wrote the film as taking place in summer, however circumstances meant that they instead had to film in winter. The film is set in August, with the characters remarking on the strangeness of the cold at that time of year.

Ben Rafael had been in talks with the agent of Ronit Elkabetz for Elkabetz to take on the role of the famous actress. However, Elkabetz was ill and died of Cancer in July 2016.

=== Soundtrack ===
The film soundtrack features a number of Israeli artists;

- A version of Leonard Cohen's song "Dance Me to the End of Love", by Dikla
- "Archimedean Point" by Renana Ne'eman
- "Ten Li" & "The Loz Sisters" by Yifeat Ziv

== Release ==
The film received its world premiere at the Tribeca Film Festival in June 2018. It received its Israeli premiere at the Jerusalem Film Festival in Jerusalem on 30 July 2018.

The film was released theatrically in France on 25 July 2018, before its theatrical release on 8 November in Israel.

== Reception ==
Wendy Ide of Screen Daily praised the "eye-catching turn from Rieger", continuing: "Her fiercely charismatic presence, plus the film’s evocatively flyblown sense of place, should make this a fixture on the festival circuit."

=== Awards and nominations ===
Wins

- Best Actress (Rieger) - Tribeca Film Festival
- FIPRESCI Award for best Israeli Debut Film (Ben Rafael) - Jerusalem Film Festival
- Best Director (Ben Rafael) - Filmski Festival Herceg Novi - Montenegro Film Festival
- Best Actress (Rieger) - Filmski Festival Herceg Novi - Montenegro Film Festival

Nominations

- Best International Narrative Feature (Ben Rafael) – Tribeca Film Festival
- Best Actress (Rieger) - Ophir Award
- Best Supporting Actor (Aloni) - Ophir Award
- Best Supporting Actress (Dodina) – Ophir Award
- Best Cinematography (Dufresne) - Ophir Award
- Best Costume Design Design - Chen Carmi-Blair
- Grand Jury Prize (Ben Rafael) - Quebec City Film Festival
