= Human Flowers of Flesh =

- Directed by: Helena Wittmann
- Written by: Helena Wittman
- Produced by: Frank Scheuffele; Karsten Krause; Julia Collen
- Starring: Angeliki Papoulia; Ferhat Mouhali; Gustavo de Mattos Jahn; Ingo Martens; Mauro Soares; Vladimir Vulevic; Steffen Danek; Nina Villanova; Denis Lavant
- Cinematography: Helena Wittman
- Edited by: Helena Wittman
- Music by: Nika Son
- Production companies: Fuenferfilm; Tita Productions
- Release date: 7 August 2022 (Locarno Film Festival)
- Running time: 106 minutes
- Countries: France; Germany
- Languages: English; French; Portuguese; Serbo-Croatian

Human Flowers of Flesh is a 2022 French-German drama film directed by Helena Wittmann, starring Angeliki Papoulia, Ferhat Mouhali, Gustavo de Mattos Jahn, Ingo Martens, Mauro Soares, Vladimir Vulevic, Steffen Danek, Nina Villanova and Denis Lavant.

== Cast ==
- Angeliki Papoulia as Ida
- Ferhat Mouhali
- Gustavo de Mattos Jahn
- Ingo Martens
- Mauro Soares
- Vladimir Vulevic
- Steffen Danek
- Nina Villanova
- Denis Lavant

== Release ==
The film premiered at the Locarno Film Festival on 7 August 2022.

== Plot ==
Ida is the owner of a sailing yacht with an international crew consisting of five men: Vlad from Croatia, Farouk from Algeria, Falco from Germany, Mauro from Portugal, and Carlos from Brasil. They rarely speak to each other and go about their daily tasks on the ship in silence. In Marseille, Ida becomes enamored with the French Foreign Legion, which has its headquarters in nearby Aubagne. Together with her crew, she embarks on a journey across the Mediterranean Sea towards the Algerian city of Sidi Bel Abbès, the former headquarters of the French Foreign Legion until 1962.

== Reception ==
David Jenkins of Little White Lies called the film "wholly intoxicating and immersive". Sophie Monks Kaufman of IndieWire called the film a "meditative gem powered by images, shot by Wittmann herself, that, on their own terms, make the film worth your time." James Lattimer of Sight & Sound called the film a "gorgeously immersive, fluid work of cinema."

Neil Young of Screen Daily wrote that Wittman "struggles to assemble promising fragments into a satisfactory whole" and called the film a "textbook big-screen example of ambition far outrunning execution." Marta Bałaga of Cineuropa wrote that the film is "on its very own level, either mind-numbingly dull or hypnotic."
