= Past Life (film) =

- Theatrical release poster
- Hebrew: החטאים
- Directed by: Avi Nesher
- Screenplay by: Avi Nesher
- Based on: Can Heaven Be Void? by Baruch Milch
- Produced by: Ruth Cats; Leon Edery; Moshe Edery; David M. Milch; Elad Naggar; Avi Nesher; David Silber
- Starring: Nelly Tagar; Joy Rieger
- Cinematography: Michel Abramowicz
- Edited by: Isaac Sehayek
- Music by: Cyrille Aufort; Avner Dorman; Ella Milch-Sheriff
- Production companies: Metro Communications; Artomas Communications; Ars Veritas Productions; Sunshine Films; United King Films
- Distributed by: Orion Pictures; Samuel Goldwyn Films
- Release dates: September 12, 2016 (Toronto); December 1, 2016
- Running time: 109 minutes
- Country: Israel
- Languages: Hebrew; English

Past Life (Hebrew: החטאים) is a 2016 Israeli drama film written and directed by Avi Nesher and starring Nelly Tagar and Joy Rieger. It is based on Baruch Milch's memoir Can Heaven Be Void? The film is the first of Nesher's planned trilogy.

== Plot ==
Two Israeli sisters, one a classical music composer and singer, and the other a budding journalist, try to find out what their father did during World War II in Poland, after a Polish woman runs up to one of them in a Berlin concert venue and calls her the daughter of a murderer.

== Cast ==
- Nelly Tagar as Nana Milch-Kotler
- Joy Rieger as Sephi Milch
- Doron Tavory as Baruch Milch
- Evgenia Dodina as Lusia Milch
- Tom Avni as Jeremy Kotler
- Rafael Stachowiak as Thomas Zielinski
- Katarzyna Gniewkowska as Agnieszka Zielinska

== Reception ==
The film has a 79% rating on Rotten Tomatoes. Glenn Kenny of RogerEbert.com awarded Past Life three stars. Joseph Friar of The Victoria Advocate also gave Past Life three stars. Peter Goldberg of Slant Magazine gave Past Life two and a half stars out of four. Bruce Demara of the Toronto Star awarded the film three stars out of four. Gayle MacDonald of The Globe and Mail gave the film two stars out of four. Barbara VanDenburgh of The Arizona Republic awarded it two and a half stars out of five. Mark Jenkins of The Washington Post gave it two stars out of four.

Diane Carlson of KDHX praised the performances of Tagar and Rieger writing that they "present their characters' contrasting personalities beautifully, sparring like real sisters." Hannah Brown of The Jerusalem Post also praised Tagar and Rieger: "All the actors do extraordinary work, but the standouts are Rieger and Tagar in the lead roles." Ben Kenigsberg of The New York Times wrote a positive review, describing the film as "a page-turner that transforms into a clarion call: always compelling, but slightly stifled by noble intentions." Kenneth Turan of the Los Angeles Times wrote a positive review: "Uneven but ultimately effective, convincing in mood and emotion despite its melodramatic plotting, Avi Nesher's Past Life is straight-ahead filmmaking heightened by a connection to a pervasive Israeli reality not often found on film." Susan G. Cole of Now gave it a positive review and wrote "this is first-rate filmmaking, and the cast, especially Tagar, prickly yet tender, is very good." Allan Hunter of Screen Daily gave the film a positive review and wrote "The initial set-up of Past Life feels clunky, but once we are back in Israel and the sisters reluctantly confront their dour, domineering father Baruch it settles into a more confident, convincing phase." Alissa Simon of Variety also gave it a positive review, calling it "profoundly moving".
