= The Eternal Return of Antonis Paraskevas =

2013 film

- Directed by: Elina Psykou
- Written by: Elina Psykou
- Starring: Christos Stergioglou
- Cinematography: Dionysis Efthymiopoulos
- Release date: 11 February 2013 (Berlin)
- Running time: 88 minutes
- Country: Greece
- Language: Greek

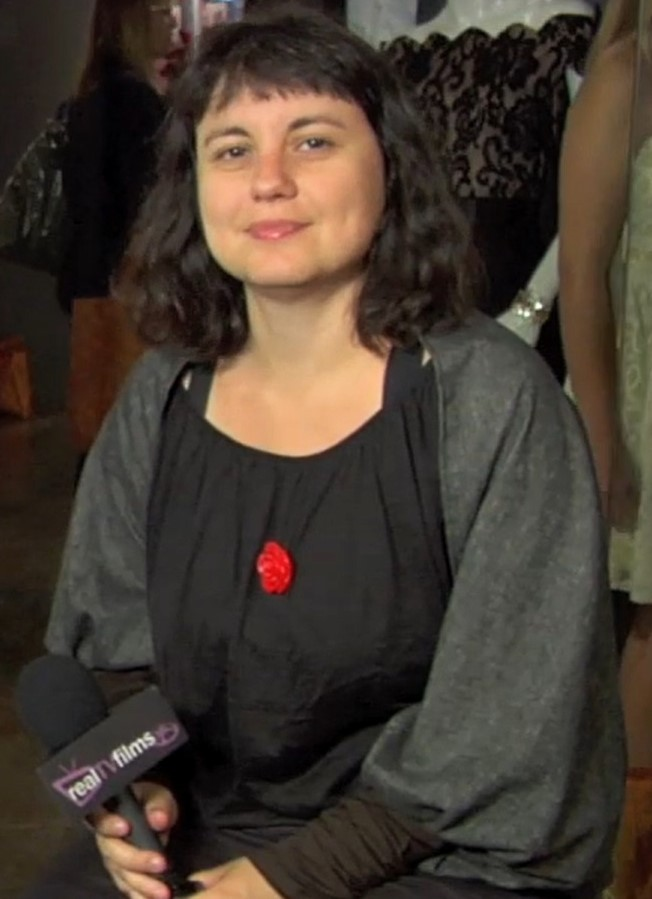
Elena Psikou interviewed about the film in 2013

The Eternal Return of Antonis Paraskevas (Greek: Η αιώνια επιστροφή του Αντώνη Παρασκευά, translit. I aionia epistrofi tou Antoni Paraskeua) is a 2013 Greek drama film written and directed by Elina Psikou. It was screened in the City to City section at the 2013 Toronto International Film Festival.

== Cast ==
- Christos Stergioglou
- Maria Kallimani
- Yorgos Souxes
- Theodora Tzimou
- Syllas Tzoumerkas
- Lena Giaka
- Vasilis Dimitroulias
