= Patchwork (2021 film) =

2021 film directed by Petros Charalambous

- Directed by: Petros Charalambous
- Written by: Janine Teerling
- Produced by: Janine Teerling; Marios Piperdes
- Starring: Angeliki Papoulia; Joy Rieger; Stella Fyrogeni; Andreas Tselepos
- Cinematography: Yorgos Rahmatoulin
- Edited by: Sylianos Costantinou; Kyros Papavassilou
- Music by: Christos Kyriakoullis
- Production company: AMP Filmworks
- Release dates: 24 August 2021 (Czech Republic); 22 March 2023 (Israel)
- Running time: 87 minutes
- Countries: Cyprus; Israel; Slovenia
- Languages: Greek; English

Patchwork is a 2021 drama film directed by Petros Charalambous and co-directed by Janine Teerling, who also wrote the film's screenplay. The film stars Angeliki Papoulia as Chara, a woman struggling with the pressures imposed by motherhood.

Patchwork was produced by AMP Filmworks, a Cypriot production company, in collaboration with the Israeli company Transfax Film Productions and the Slovenian production company Perfo Production.

== Premise ==
Chara (Papoulia) struggles with anxiety as she and her husband Andreas (Tselepos) raise their six-year-old daughter, Sophia. Much of the distress stems from Chara's own childhood, as she is reluctant for her mother to meet Sophia.

Meanwhile, at her work at an architecture firm, Chara's friendship with human resources manager Christie (Fyrogeni) is strained by the latter's seemingly happy child free lifestyle. Chara is forced to address the causes of her pain when she strikes up a friendly relationship with Melina (Rieger) the teenage daughter of a new Israeli architect at the firm.

== Cast ==
- Angeliki Papoulia as Chara
- Joy Rieger as Melina, the teenage daughter of the new head creative at the architecture firm where Chara works
- Stella Fyrogeni as Christie, Chara's friend and the human resources manager at the architecture firm
- Andreas Tselepos as Andreas, Chara's husband
- Antonis Kafetzopoulos as Yiorgos
- Shiree Nadav-Naor as Yael

== Release ==
Patchwork debuted in August 2021 at the 55th Karlovy Vary International Film Festival in the Czech Republic. Later that year, the film premiered in the United Kingdom, Germany, and Greece, at the Raindance Film Festival, Braunschweig International Film Festival, and Thessaloniki International Film Festival, respectively.

In 2022, Patchwork screened at the European Union Film Festival in Canada and the Pune International Film Festival in India. The film premiered in Israel the following year.

== Accolades ==
Award	Date	Category	Recipient(s)	Result	Ref.
Karlovy Vary International Film Festival	August 28, 2021	Best Film	Patchwork	Nominated	
Braunschweig International Film Festival	November 3, 2021	Best Film in the Main Competition – Jury Prize	Patchwork	Nominated	
Braunschweig International Film Festival	November 3, 2021	Best Film in the Main Competition – Audience Award	Patchwork	Nominated	
The Arab Critic's Awards for European Films	December 5, 2021	Best Film	Patchwork	Nominated	
Athens Panorama of European Cinema	February 2, 2022	Greek Film Prize	Patchwork	Won	
Cyprus Film Days International Festival	April 20, 2022	Best Actress	Angeliki Papoulia	Won	
Los Angeles Greek Film Festival	May 15, 2022	Best Actress	Angeliki Papoulia	Won	
Hellenic Film Academy Awards	June 8, 2022	Best Actress	Angeliki Papoulia	Nominated	
Cinedays Skopje Film Festival	July 14, 2022	Best Film	Patchwork	Nominated	
