= A Blast =

- Theatrical release poster
- Directed by: Syllas Tzoumerkas
- Written by: Syllas Tzoumerkas; Youla Boudali
- Produced by: Maria Drandaki; Titus Kreyenberg; Ellen Havenith; Jeroen Beker
- Starring: Angeliki Papoulia; Vassilis Doganis; Maria Filini; Makis Papadimitriou; Themis Bazaka
- Cinematography: Pantelis Mantzanas
- Edited by: Kathrin Dietzel
- Production companies: Homemade Films unafilm PRPL; Bastide Films; Mamoko Entertainment
- Distributed by: Strada Films; Real Fiction; Against Gravity; IndiePix Films (VOD); Filmfreak; Spot on distribution Ost for Paradis; Bonsai Films etc.
- Release date: 9 August 2014 (Locarno)
- Running time: 82 minutes
- Countries: Greece; Germany; Netherlands; Italy
- Language: Greek

A Blast (Greek: Η έκρηξη), is a 2014 film directed by Syllas Tzoumerkas about a woman's disillusionment and revolt in the frame of the Greek financial crisis. The film stars Angeliki Papoulia, Vassilis Doganis, Maria Filini, Themis Bazaka, Makis Papadimitriou and Yorgos Biniaris.

Tzoumerkas' second feature film after Hora Proelefsis, A Blast had its world premiere at the International Competition section of the Locarno International Film Festival 2014. Praised by the international press for its visceral filming and acting, its bold content and form, the film went on to screen in over 70 festivals and to be theatrically released in many countries around the world.

== Cast ==
- Angeliki Papoulia as Maria
- Vassilis Doganis as Yannis
- Maria Filini as Gogo
- Themis Bazaka as the mother
- Yorgos Biniaris as the father
- Makis Papadimitriou as Costas
- Haris Attonis as the clerk
- Eleni Karagiorgi as Niki
- Christoph Berlet as Joy

== Plot ==
A woman's violent journey to a renewed and disillusioned sense of self passes through a series of catastrophes. Following her mother's suicide after entrapping her whole family in a huge debt, Maria, a mother of three, decides to burn the forest surrounding her father's village to get money from a construction company, abandon her loving but constantly cheating and absent husband and their three children, coming to unreconcilable clashes with her always passive father, her half-crazy sister and her fascist brother-in-law. Bits of her rogue present are constantly interwoven with the days of her brighter, full of potential and sexually flourishing love past, creating a dazzling portrait of a woman and a country breaking into pieces.

== Production ==
A Blast was first presented as an in development project by Homemade Films and producer Maria Drandaki at the Cinelink of the Sarajevo Film Festival 2012 where it was awarded with the Eurimages Co-production Development Award. German producer Titus Kreyenberg and Dutch producers Ellen Havenith and Jeroen Beker became attached and the film was funded by the Greek Film Center, the Dutch Film Fund, Film und Medienstiftung NRW and Filmfoerderung Hamburg Schleswig-Holstein. Pan Entertainment, Graal SA, Marni Films, Mamoko Entertainment, Prosenghisi LTD, and Movimento Film served as co-producers. As Syllas Tzoumerkas stated in an interview with Cineuropa, the film's production was delayed and put in jeopardy by prime-minister Antonis Samaras' abrupt shutting down of ERT, the Greek state television, however the film started production in September 2013.

Filming took place in Athens, Hamburg and the under construction tunnels of the Aegean Highway connecting Larisa to Thessaloniki.

== Release ==
The film premiered at the 2014 Locarno International Film Festival. Due to the film's explicit sex scenes, Locarno Film Festival put on its catalogue, tickets and promotional publications the note that "this film may hurt the sensitivities of some viewers". After its world premiere, the film became a festival-circuit regular, screening in several international film festivals such as BFI London Film Festival, Sarajevo Film Festival, Rotterdam Film Festival, Karlovy Vary Film Festival (Variety's 10 European Directors to Watch), Jeonju Film Festival, São Paulo Film Festival (New Directors Competition), Hamburg Filmfest, Hong-Kong Film Festival, etc. It was released in Greece 22 November 2014 by Strada Films, and after that in Holland (12 March 2015), Germany (16 April 2015), Italy (27 August 2015), Poland (12 September 2015), Denmark (19 September 2014), etc. The film's DVD and VOD release is handled in the US by Indiepix FIlms.

== Reception ==
Screen Daily's chief film critic Mark Adams gave the film a rave review upon its world premiere at the Locarno International Film Festival calling it a "freewheeling and full-on drama, driven forcefully and with a certain fearlessness by a striking lead performance by Angeliki Papoulia as a free-spirited woman who reaches the end of her tether". Indiewire & The Playlist's Jessica Kiang called the film a "punchy, difficult, allegorically urgent Greek tragedy, where a narrative of personal liberation becomes a political allegory of powerful pessimism", reading the main character's journey as "a series of assassinations". The Hollywood Reporter's Jonathan Holland describes the film as "a black, bleak, urgently contemporary film, Syllas Tzoumerkas' charged personal diatribe against an economic system seemingly designed first to make people, and then to break them". In October 2015, Guy Lodge gave the film a mixed review in Variety, praising the film for its energy and performances, but criticising it over thematic and construction elements, calling it "unruly, exhausting but appropriately incendiary".

The film was met with mostly positive to great reviews in the countries it was released, praised for its bold directing and editing style and Angeliki Papoulia's lead performance. Der Spiegel's Oliver Kaever called Angeliki Papoulia "one of the most fearless European actress" for her turn as Maria and Polityka in Poland called it "a uniquely intelligent, unprecedented portrait that reveals the moods, secrets and deep divisions that run in the Greek society in the times of crisis". Süddeutsche Zeitung's F.Goettler noted that "with its passionate, impetuous and revolting hero A Blast is the Greek crisis" and in Dutch Der Filmkrant Joost Booren wrote that "Syllas Tzoumerkas takes in his energetic second film emphatic distance from the 'Greek Weird Wave'. "A Blast" is an angry film that speaks its heart". On the contrary, upon its release in its home country Greece, the film was met with mixed reviews, with critics in leading newspapers like To Vima and magazines like Athinorama reacting negatively to its pessimistic view of the country, its complicated structure and overt sexuality. Favourable reviews of the film were written in Lifo and Cinema magazines and Kathimerini newspaper.

== Accolades ==
A Blast and Syllas Tzoumerkas were nominated for the Golden Leopard at the International Competition of the Locarno Film Festival 2014, the Heart of Sarajevo at the Sarajevo International Film Festival 2014, the New Directors Competition Award of the São Paulo International Film Festival, the New Directors Competition of the Seattle International Film Festival, among others. The film was selected by the A.F.I. (American Film Institute) for its annual European Film Showcase and was awarded with the Jury Prize and the FIPRESCI Jury prize in Otranto and Prishtina film festivals respectively. For her performance as Gogo, Maria Filini was awarded with the Best Debut Actress Award at the Athens Film Festival 2015.
