= Maytal Michaeli =

Israeli actress and singer

- מיטל מיכאלי
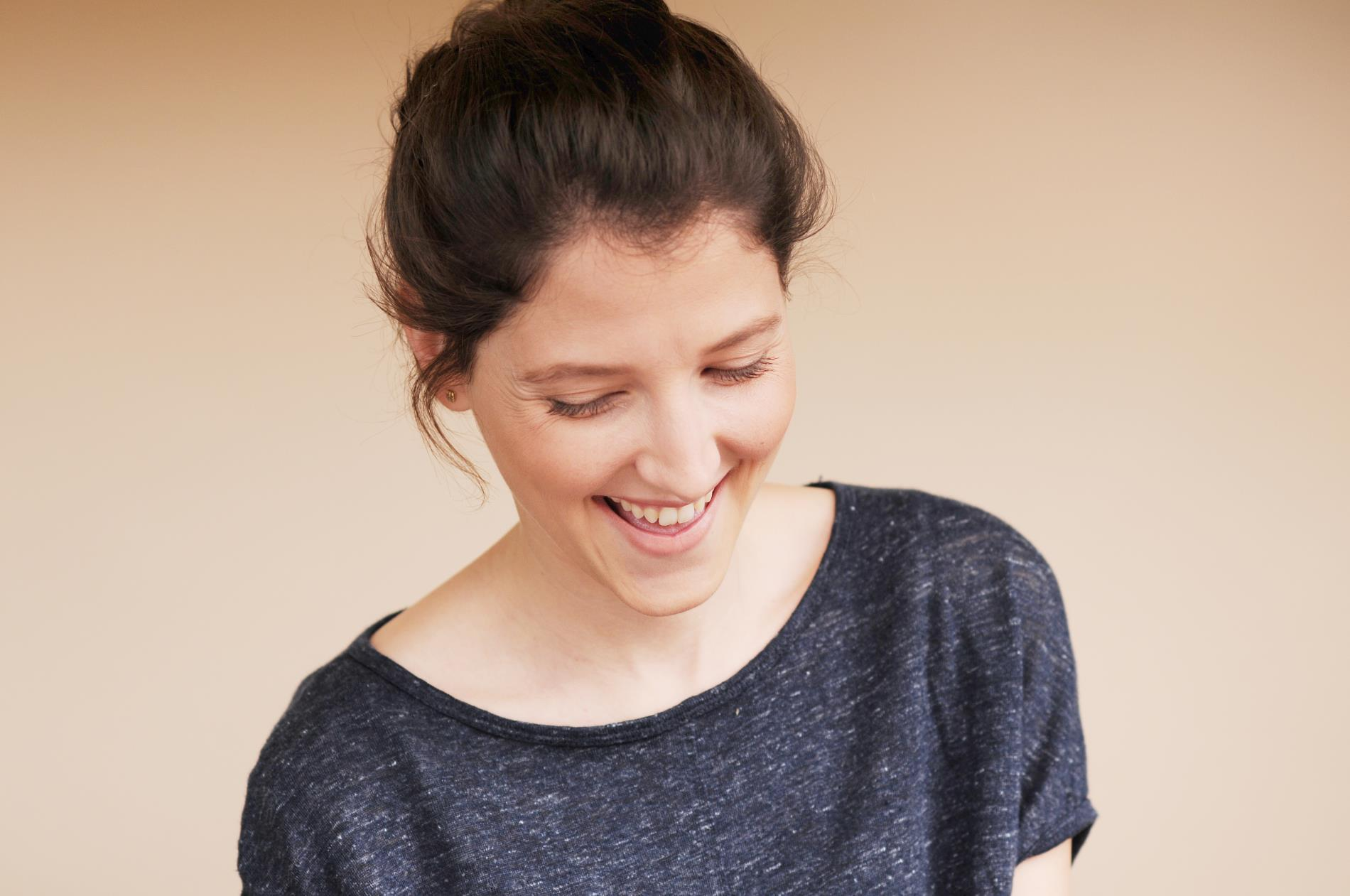
- Born: 19 November 1985 (age 40); Virginia, U.S.
- Other names: Meital Michaeli, Meytal Michaeli
- Occupations: Actress; voice actress; singer
- Years active: 1997–present
- Website: maytalmichaeli.com

Maytal Michaeli (Hebrew: מיטל מיכאלי; born 19 November 1985), name sometimes transcribed as Meital Michaeli, is an Israeli actress, voice actress and singer.
