= Nelly Tagar =

Israeli actress and stand-up comedian

- נלי תגר
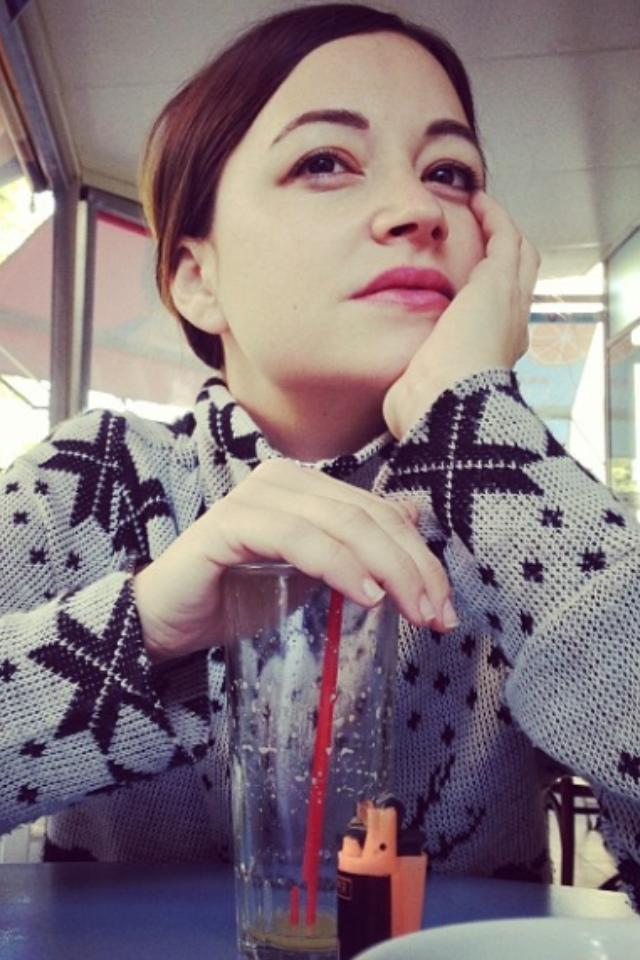
- Born: 30 November 1982 (age 43); Tel Aviv, Israel
- Citizenship: Israeli
- Occupations: Actress; comedian
- Years active: 1993–present
- Height: 5ft 2in (157cm)
- Spouse: Eitan Sarid (m. 2012)
- Children: 2
- Awards: Israeli Academy Award for Best Actress in a TV Comedy (2016)

Nelly Tagar (Hebrew: נלי תגר, IPA: [ˈnεli taˈgaʁ]; born 30 November 1982) is an Israeli actress and stand-up comedian. Tagar is the recipient of the 2016 Israeli Academy Award for Best Actress in a TV Comedy, for her performance as Natalie Katan in Sisters. Known within Israel for her role of Daffi in the 2014 film Zero Motivation, she gained international acclaim in 2016 for portraying Nana Milch-Kotler in Past Life, directed by Avi Nesher. Tagar is famous for often playing roles of characters much younger than her in real life, by virtue of her juvenile appearance.

== Early life ==
Tagar was born on 30 November 1982, to lawyers Tiva and Rafi Tagar, Bulgarian Jews who immigrated from Bulgaria prior to her birth. She was named after her paternal grandmother. She grew up in Ramat Gan. She had her first movie role in 1993, portraying a battered child in Dan Wolman's short film, Haverot. After the film achieved august success, Wolman went on to pick Tagar for more roles in his films, triggering her acting career. In 2000, Tagar played the role of Shiri in Dan Wolman's JFFA-winning movie Foreign Sister. Later on the same year, her father Rafi died from aneurysm after being comatose for a year. From 2000 to 2002, Tagar served in the IDF, fulfilling her conscription duty as an Israeli citizen.

== Acting career ==
Upon being released from the army, Tagar decided to stay focused on her acting career. In 2006, she starred in Tied Hands (Yadayim Kshurot), alongside Gila Almagor. The Israeli actress' next notable film appearance was only in 2011, starring as the security guard in the memorable final scene of Footnote. The film went on to win the 2011 Ophir Award on 9 different categories. The movie was also nominated for an Oscar for Best Foreign Language Film. Never having really based her status as a movie star in Israel, she had a supporting role in Asfur in 2011, playing Orly in 9 episodes. Her career was propelled forward by her critically acclaimed role in the 2014 movie Zero Motivation. She was nominated for the Ophir Award for Best Actress the same year. IndieWire named her as one of the 20 "breakthrough" actresses of 2014, noting that "Tagar's mostly worked in TV back in Israel, but with the growing buzz around Zero Motivation, [they] wouldn't be surprised to see her ending up with gigs further afield down the line". Starting her professional career at the relatively old age of 31, Tagar's newfound star status in Israel became more noticeable in 2016, when she was cast for the lead role of Natalie Katan in Sisters, and simultaneously for the role of the main antagonist in the teen musical comedy-drama TV show Oboy, which won an Israeli Academy Award for Best Comedy. In 2017, Tagar's performance as Natalie Katan won her her first Israeli Academy Award for acting. Throughout 2018, Tagar was a panelist on Gav Ha'Uma on 10 different occasions. Nowadays, she also plays Romi Gilman in the TeenNick comedy Forever.

== Modeling career ==
In 2019, Tagar was named as one of the 13 models to lead the H&M 'Spring Collection' clothing line, which entailed clothing made entirely out of eco-friendly materials.

== Activism ==
Tagar is an avid supporter of the rallies in favour of distancing the gas platforms from the Israeli coastline. She has made statements supporting feminism as well as promoting LGBT rights in Israel. During the April 2019 Israeli legislative election, she became affiliated with the left-of-centre party Kahol Lavan and promoted the idea of a leftist coalition government on social media.

== Personal life ==
Nelly Tagar is the eldest daughter of Rafi (1946–2000) and Tiva. She has two younger siblings, Aharona and Josef. On 4 October 2012, Tagar married cinematographer Eitan Sarid. She gave birth to a son, Rashi, on 4 March 2017 and a daughter, Tamara, on 24 December 2020.

Tagar lives in Tel Aviv.
