= Le Trident (theatre) =

Group of three theatres in Cherbourg-Octeville, Manche, Normandy, France

Coordinates: 49.6378°N 1.6229°W

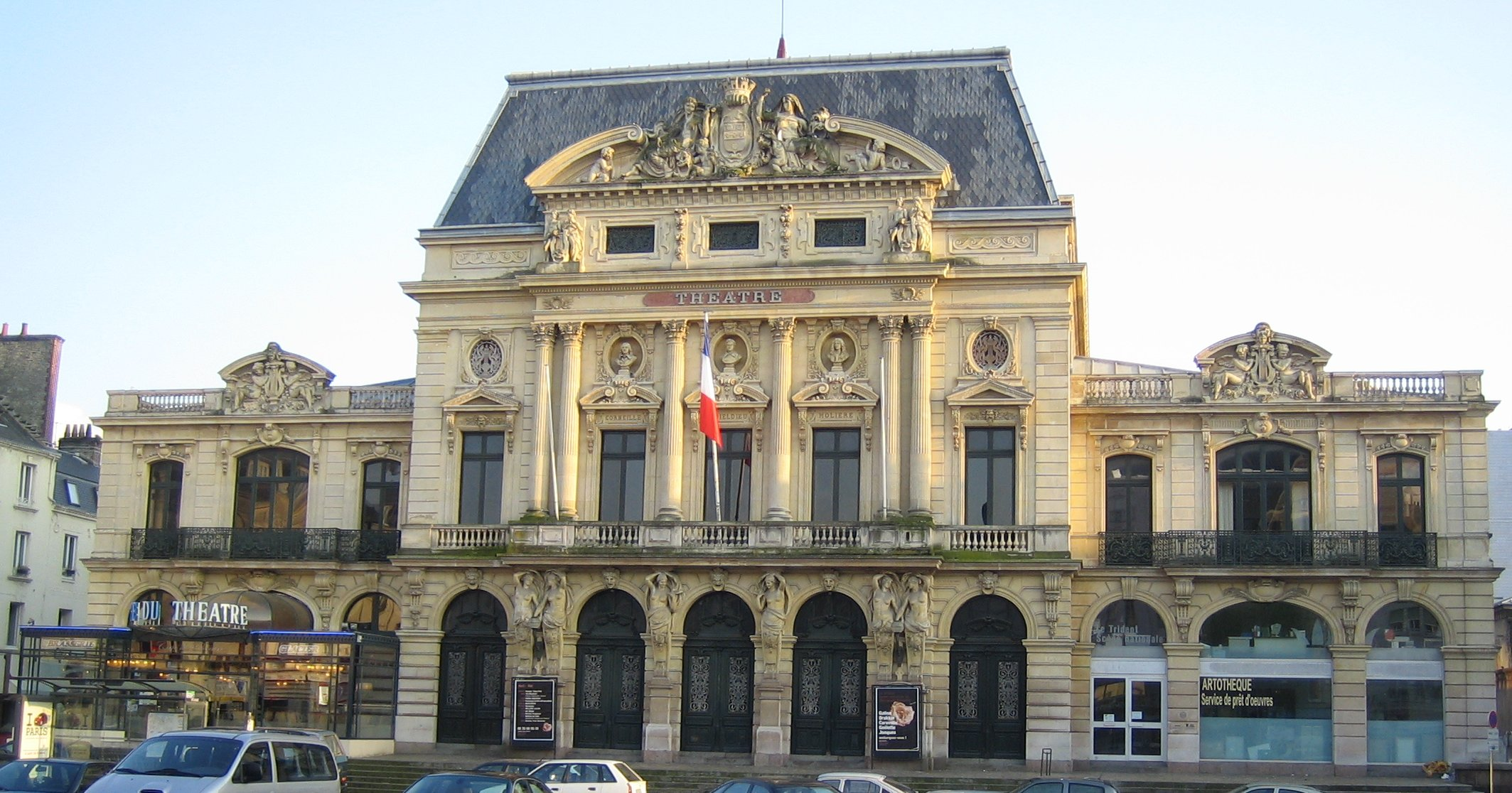
Beaux-Arts facade of Théâtre à l'italienne, in Cherbourg-Octeville.

Le Trident is a group of three theatres in the city of Cherbourg-Octeville, within the Manche department of Normandy, in northern France.

The theatres were made a 'scène nationale' on 14 October, 2002, after the merger of the Théâtre de Cherbourg-Scène Nationale and the Théâtre de la Butte-CCPO.

== Theatres ==
The three theatres are:

- Théâtre à l'italienne — in Cherbourg district
- Théâtre de la Butte — in Octeville district
- Vox Théâtre — in Cherbourg-Octeville
