= Hora Proelefsis =

- Directed by: Syllas Tzoumerkas
- Written by: Syllas Tzoumerkas; Youla Boudali
- Produced by: Maria Drandaki; Thanos Anastopoulos; Syllas Tzoumerkas
- Starring: Amalia Moutoussi; Thanos Samaras; Ioanna Tsirigouli; Errikos Litsis; Youla Boudali; Christos Passalis
- Cinematography: Pantelis Mantzanas
- Edited by: Panos Voutsaras
- Music by: drog_A_tek
- Release dates: September 2010 (Venice); 21 October 2010 (Greece)
- Running time: 111 minutes
- Country: Greece
- Language: Greek

Hora Proelefsis (Greek: Χώρα Προέλευσης, (Homeland) is a 2010 Greek drama film directed by Syllas Tzoumerkas. It narrates the bitter consequences of an adoption on the members of a Greek family, in the frame of the political events of the country's post-junta era.

Hora Proelefsis had its world premiere at the International Critics' Week of the 67th Venice International Film Festival. It was released in Greek cinemas in October 2010 and participated in numerous international festivals (Tallinn Black Nights, Göteborg Film Festival, Istanbul, Mar Del Plata, Karlovy Vary Film Festival, New Horizons etc.).

== Cast ==
- Amalia Moutoussi
- Thanos Samaras
- Ioanna Tsirigouli
- Errikos Litsis
- Youla Boudali
- Ieronymos Kaletsanos
- Despina Georgakopoulou
- Nikos Flessas
- Marissa Triantafyllidou
- Maria Kallimani
- Alexandros Parissis
- Zoe Lianostathi
- Katerina Papageorgiou

== Accolades ==
Event	Category	Winner/Nominee	Won
67th Venice International Film Festival	Luigi de Laurentis award	Syllas Tzoumerkas	No
67th Venice International Film Festival	Critics' Week Audience Award	Syllas Tzoumerkas	No
Hellenic Film Academy Awards	Best Feature Film	Maria Drandaki, Thanos Anastopoulos, Syllas Tzoumerkas	No
Hellenic Film Academy Awards	Best Director	Syllas Tzoumerkas	No
Hellenic Film Academy Awards	Best First Film Director	Syllas Tzoumerkas	Yes
Hellenic Film Academy Awards	Best Screenplay	Syllas Tzoumerkas and Youla Boudali	No
Hellenic Film Academy Awards	Best Actor	Thanos Samaras	No
Hellenic Film Academy Awards	Best Supporting Actor	Errikos Litsis	No
Hellenic Film Academy Awards	Best Supporting Actress	Ioanna Tsirigouli	Yes
Hellenic Film Academy Awards	Best Editor	Panos Voutsaras (tie)	Yes
Hellenic Film Academy Awards	Best Music Composer	drog_A_tek	Yes
Hellenic Film Academy Awards	Best Costumes Design	Mayou Trikerioti	No
Hellenic Film Academy Awards	Best Sound	Aris Louziotis, Dimitris Kanellopoulos, Costas Varybopiotis, Panos Voutsaras	No
Hellenic Film Academy Awards	Best Make-up	Evi Zafiropoulou	Yes
New Horizons Festival	Grand Jury Prize	Syllas Tzoumerkas	No
Voices International Film Festival	Grand Prix	Syllas Tzoumerkas	No
Athens Film Festival	Best First Film director	Syllas Tzoumerkas	Yes
