= Ephraim Sidon =

Israeli author

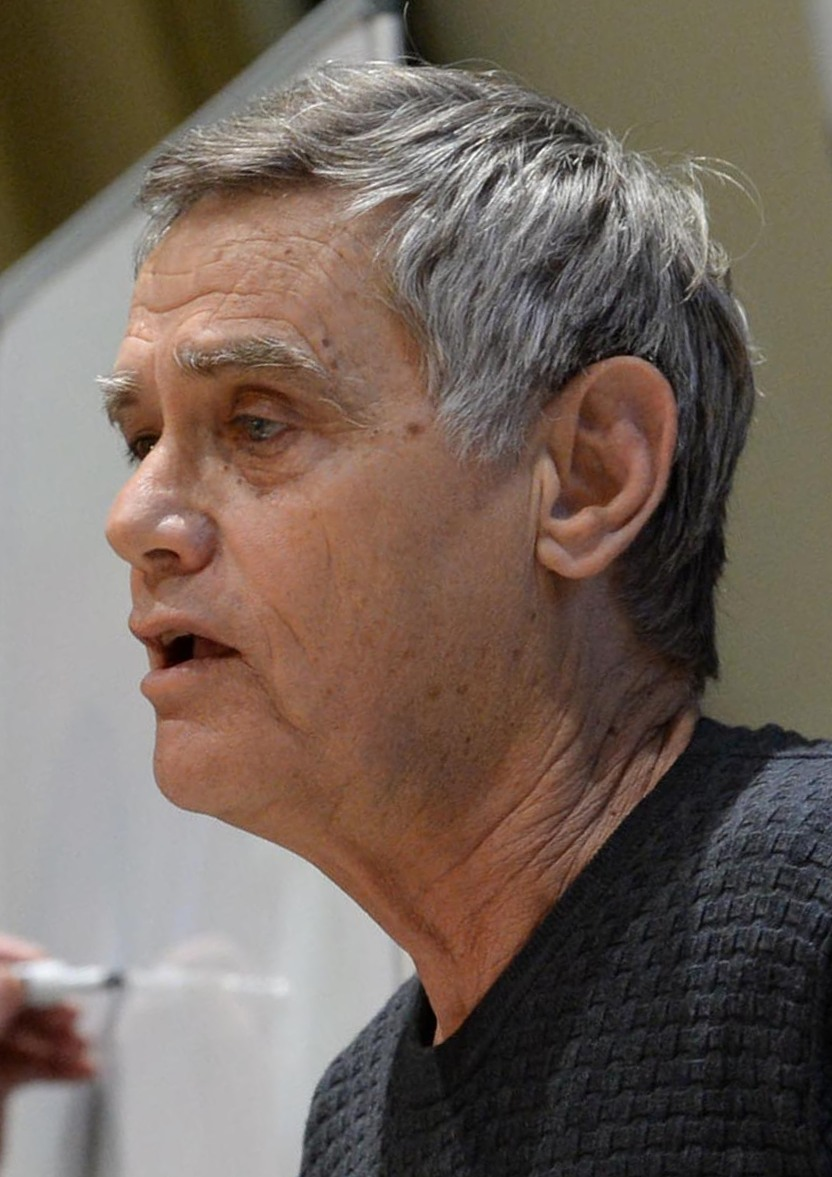
Ephraim Sidon (2018).

Ephraim Sidon (Hebrew: אפרים סידון; born February 26, 1946) is an Israeli author, playwright, and satirist, noted for both his satirical work and his children's books.

== Biography ==
Sidon was born in Jerusalem in 1946 and today lives in Tel Aviv with his family, where he continues to play a central role in Israeli culture.

== Professional and literary career ==
In the early 1970s, he collaborated with some of Israel's most notable writers and satirists publishing a student newspaper and throughout the 1970s this group went on to create some of Israel's most original and diverse work for newspapers and television. In 1974, they created the first satirical cult program for Israeli Television, Nikui Rosh ("Head Cleaning"). He then went on to write Zehu Ze; one of Israeli television's biggest comical successes to date. In addition to his work for newspapers and television, he wrote vastly for the stage.

In the 1990s Sidon gained status as the top writer for the Israeli Channel 2 satirical puppet show Chartzufim, the Israeli version of Spitting Image. This program mocked the Israeli government mainly during the governments of Barak and Netanyahu. Sidon continued playing a major role in the satirical front of Israel's main publications and enjoyed a wide following with weekly satirical columns in leading newspapers, including a much-acclaimed weekly sketch based on Biblical Stories.

However, Sidon is most loved and acknowledged for his children's books, with their imaginative characters, rhyme and strong underlying morals. He has published 25 books for children, which are part of the Israeli theatrical canon. His most notable books include the bestselling Baldy Heights and Uzu and Muzu from Kakaruzu. His books have been widely translated.

== Awards ==
In 2004, Sidon was a co-recipient (jointly with David Grossman and Haya Shenhav) of the Bialik Prize for literature.

== See also ==
- List of Bialik Prize recipients
