= Alexander Voulgaris =

Greek film director

- Αλέξανδρος Βούλγαρης
- Born: 22 February 1981 (age 44); Athens, Greece
- Occupation(s): Film director Actor; Composer
- Notable work: Thread; Roz; Higuita
- Spouse: Maria
- Parents: Pantelis Voulgaris; Ioanna Karystiani
- Relatives: Constantina Voulgaris (sister)

Alexander Voulgaris (Greek: Αλέξανδρος Βούλγαρης; born 1981) is a Greek film director, screenwriter, composer and actor. Films Voulgaris wrote, directed and scored include Thread, Roz and Higuita. His composing credits include The Last Note, Park and The Sentimentalists, the latter of which garnered him a Hellenic Film Academy Award for "Best Music."

Voulgaris is frequently credited as "The Boy." He is the son of Pantelis Voulgaris and Ioanna Karystiani.

== Filmography ==
As a director

- Polydroso Side Story (1998)
- Good cork pin (2000)
- Are you crying? (2003)
- Pink (2006)
- Higita (2012)
- Thread (2016)
- Winona (2019)
- Gym (2020)
- They Come Out of Margo (2025) Premiere at the 59th Karlovy Vary International Film Festival on 8 July 2025, competing for Proxima Grand Prix.
