= 2014 Shanghai International Film Festival =

Chinese film festival

- Location: Shanghai, China
- Awards: Golden Goblet
- No. of films: more than 200
- Website: http://www.siff.com

Shanghai International Film Festival chronology
- 2015 2013

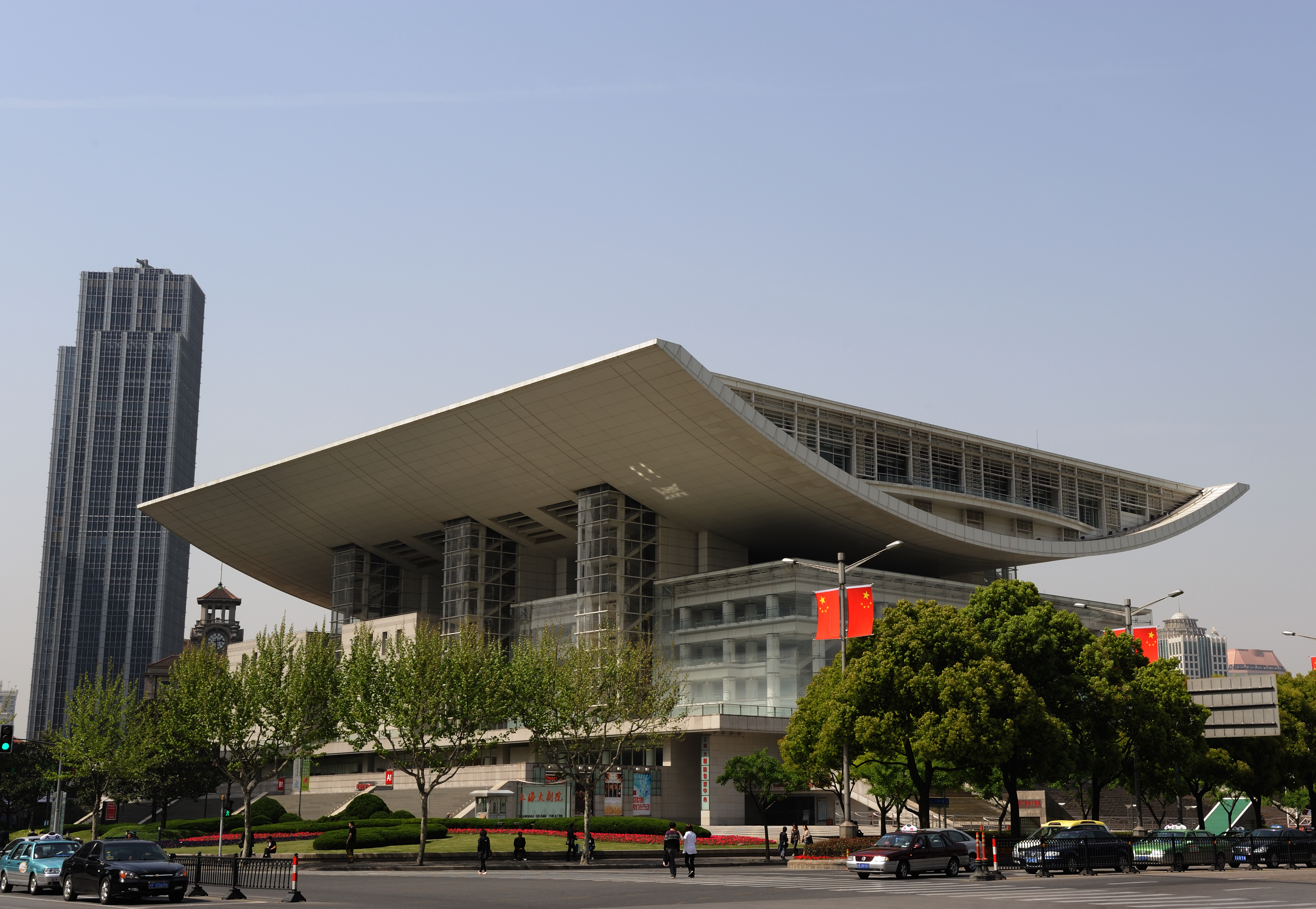
Shanghai Grand Theater

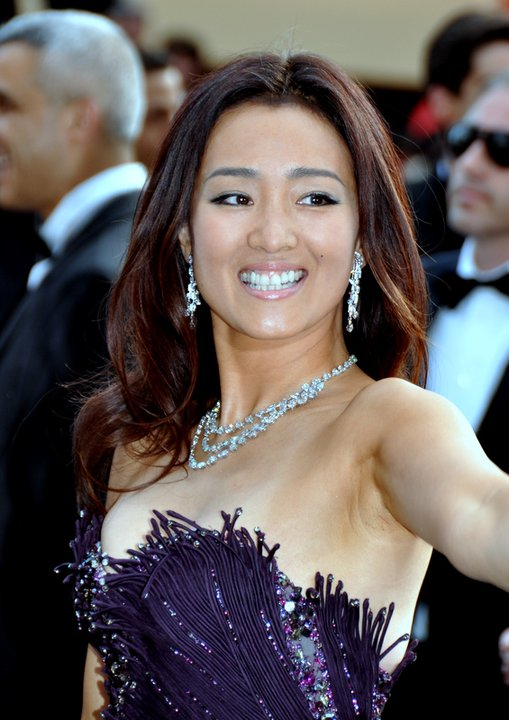
Gong Li, first woman president of the jury for the Golden Goblet Award

The 2014 Shanghai International Film Festival was the 17th such festival devoted to international cinema held in Shanghai, China.

== International Jury ==
The members of the jury for the Golden Goblet Award were:

- Gong Li (Chinese actress; president of the jury)
- Im Sangsoo (South Korean director and screenwriter)
- Shunji Iwai (Japanese film director)
- Liu Jie (Chinese director)
- Peyman Moaadi (Iranian actor and director)
- Sally Potter (UK director)
- Lone Scherfig (Danish director)

== Winners ==
- Best Feature Film: Little England
- Jury Grand Prix: The Uncle Victory
- Best Director: Pantelis Voulgaris (Little England)
- Best Actress: Pinelopi Tsilika (Little England)
- Best Actor: Vithaya Pansringarm (The Last Executioner)
- Best Screenplay: Cyril Gely and Volker Schlöndorff (Diplomacy)
- Best Cinematography: Luo Pan (The Sacred Arrow)
- Best Music: Gregg Alexander (Begin Again)
