= Pavlos Kourtidis =

Greek actor (1973–2026)

- Παύλος Κουρτίδης
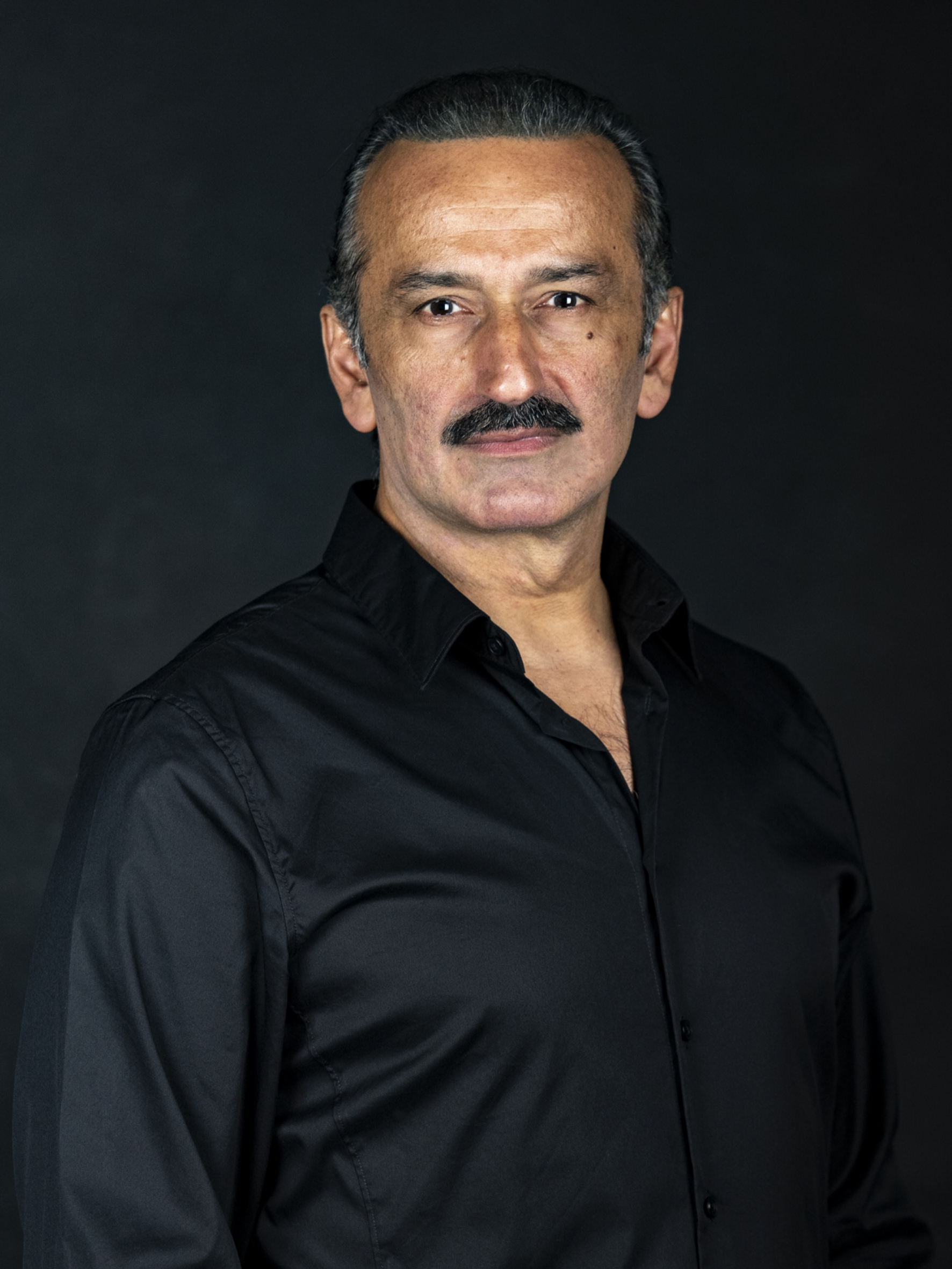
- Kourtidis in 2024
- Born: 1971; Wuppertal, North Rhine-Westphalia, West Germany
- Died: 20 June 2026 (aged 53)
- Education: ArtsEd London
- Occupation: Actor
- Height: 1.83 m (6 ft 0 in)
- Children: Maria Matilda Kourtidou

Pavlos Kourtidis (1971 – 20 June 2026) was a Greek actor known for 'Rembetis die Geisterjäger ZDF, 'Alt Ledig Findet' ARD Degeto, 'Klara' Warner Bros discovery - TVN, the film Kapodistrias, and 'Die Cooking Academy' ITV / Pro7. He was born and raised in Wuppertal, Germany and based in between Athens, Berlin, and Liverpool. Kourtidis spoke Greek, German and English.

== Career ==
In October 2025, Kourtidis finished shooting the romantic comedy "Alt Ledig Findet", on Crete, directed by Peter Stauch for ARD Degeto.

Also his collaboration with ZDF/ZDFneo on the comedy mystery series "Die Geisterjäger Rembetis" in one of the leading roles as Marcos Rembetis created by Jasin Challah, directed by Sophie Averkamp, was nominated for best national series, Jupiter Award 2025. The Premiere happened at Seriencamp Festival 2025. Shortly after, Pavlos Kourtidis collaborated with the television series 'Die Cooking Academy'.

In May 2025, Kourtidis completed his role for 'Klara s2' in Warsaw Poland. He appeared also in 2023 in 'Klara s1' a limited TV series, streaming at TVN, Player Original and Warner Bros discovery, directed by Lukasz Javorski.

Kourtidis was seen in the role of Konstantinos Mavromichalis for the feature film "KAPODISTRIAS", directed by Yannis Smaragdis. The film tells the story of the first Governor in Greece, Ioannis Kapodistrias.

He appeared on Greek television on various series 2023–24 last seen in the Telenovela 'HLEKTRA', channel ERT (Hellenic Broadcasting channel GR) following previously, The Witch, Red River, IQ160, Guardian of the Quarantined ships, Wild bees and others.

Kourtidis was also a voice actor ADR and Audio. He narrated audio books of Nikos Kazantzakis, Arne Dahl, Josephine Hurt and others.

He was also trained as a dancer in a three year course. For more than 15 years, from 2005 to 2020, Pavlos worked as actor, dancer and choreographer. In order to deepen his knowledge in acting, he was involved in martial arts, boxing and stage fighting.

== Death ==
Kourtidis died on 21 June 2026, at the age of 53.

== Film and television ==
'Alt ledig findet'

feature film / ARD Degeto

Director: Peter Stauch

Production: Polyphon film, Avriofilms

Role: Costas

(DE 2025)

Rembetis die Geisterjäger

Role: Marcos Rembetis

Creator: Jasin Challah

Director: Sophie Averkamp

TV series

Channel: ZDF / ZDFneo

Production: eitelsonnenschein GmbH

(DE 2025)

_____________

The Cooking Academy

Role: Priest Nikolaos

Director: Birte Robberts

TV series

Channel: ITV Germany / Pro7

Production: ITV Studios Germany GmbH

(DE 2025)

_______________

KAPODISTRIAS

Role: Konstantinos Mavromichalis

Director: Yannis Smaragdis

feature film

Production: Alexandros Film Co. Ltd.

(GR/SW/RU 2025)

______________

KLARA s2

Role: Nikos

Director: Lukas Jaworski

TV series

Channel: TVN / Warner Bros. Discovery

Production: Player TV - TVN

(2025 EN/PL)

_____________

"HLEKTRA s1 & s2"

Role: Orestis

Director: Viki Manoli

TV series

Channel: ERT 1 State-owned public television

Production: Kapa Studios - G. Karagiannis S.A.

(2024 GR)

_____________

KLARA s1

Role: Nikos

Director: Lukas Jaworski

TV series

Channel: TVN / Warner Bros. Discovery

Production: Player TV - TVN

(2023 EN/PL)

_____________

The Witch s1

Role: Ottoman Senior Officer

Director: Lefteris Charitos

TV series

Channel: ANT1

Production: Kapa Studios - G. Karagiannis S.A.

(GR/TR 2024)

_____________

Up to 2023

"To Kokkino Potami S2"

Role : Christodoulou Pavlos

Director: Manousos Manousakis

TV series

Channel: OPEN TV

Production: Telekinissi S.A

(GR/AM/TR 2022/23)

_____________

The Flame of the revolution 1821

film / documentary

Role: Theodoros Kolokotronis

Director: Manousos Manousakis

Production: Peloponnese region

(GR 2021)

_____________

Guardian of the Quarantined Ships

TV series

Role: Captain Kostantis (Pavlos Kourtidis)

Director Manousos Manousakis

Channel: ERT 1 State-owned public television

Written by Alexandros Papadiamantis

Production:ERT / Telekinissi S.A

(GR 2021)

_____________

Krisimes Stigmes

Role: Radio announcer (voice actor)

TV series

Channel: ERT 1 State-owned public television

Director Manousos Manousakis

Production: ERT/ Telekinissi S.A

(GR/DE 2021)

_____________

"Agries Melisses" s1 & s2

Role: Lias

TV Series

Director: Lefteris Charitos

Channel: ANT1

Production: Kapa Studios - G. Karagiannis S.A.

(GR 2020/21)

_____________

"Man of God"

Role: Raggedy Man

feature film

Director: Yelena Popovic

Production: Tanweer Productions

(GR/USA 2021)

_____________

"Kala-azar"

Role: Security man at crematorium

Film

Director: Janis Rafailidou

Production: SNG Film / Studio Nieuwe Gronden Heretic

Greek Film Centre (GFC) (co-production)

(ND/GR 2019)

_____________

" My name is Eftyhia"

Role: Zeibekiko Dancer

feature film

Directed by Angelos Frantzis

Production: Tanweer Productions

(GR 2019)

_________________

In 2005 he founded Pavlos Kourtidis Dancetheater (formerly Migma). The company's projects are known for combining Greek history and culture with dancetheater through an innovative perspective.

Journalist K. Betinakis spoke of his work on Styx "The choreographies were as brilliant as others – I have watched- like those by Maurice Béjart."

== Dancetheater ergography ==
=== GENOCIDE ===
- GENOCIDE Theater Director, Actor & Choreographer for 15th Nationwide Festival POE at PAOK Sports Arena Thessaloniki - October 2019
- GENOCIDE Aesxylia Festival - September 2019 inspired by the city of Elefsina.
- GENOCIDE PK Theater Athens - October 2018 - February 2019

A performance based on the true historical facts of the Pontian Greek genocide.

=== "STYX, the goddess of water" ===
Inspired the mythological Greek goddess Styx which was presented in 4 tons of water.

==== LABYRINTH ====
- Labyrinth based on Minotaur's maze that combined for the first time Cretan traditional dance with contemporary dance based on a realistic maze that represents the union of the ancient with the renovation.

=== MADHOUSE ===
"Madhouse" that was based on the true story of a man suffering from mental illness in order to communicate against the fear and social exclusion.

== Theatre ==
- 2025: "INSIDE" Theater performance Theater Alkmini
- 2021: "Don Camilo" Theater play. Role: Fluratos - Theater Broadway
- 2020: Theatre play "The Clothes" Actor at "PK Theater" Athens Greece. Director Emmanuel Manios
- 2019: Actor & Choreographer for 15th Nationwide Dance Festival POE at PAOK Sports Arena Thessaloniki
- 2019: Genocide – Festival Aisxylia Elefsina
- 2018–19: Genocide – PK Theater Athens
- 2017: Styx, the goddess of water – PK Theater, open stone theater at Platania Trifilias (Peloponnese)
- 2016: Labyrinth, from darkness to light – Pallas Theater
- 2015–16: House of Bridges – PK Theater
- 2014–15: Madhouse – PK Theater
- 2012–13: Dead-end – PK Theater
- 2010–11: Frankenstein – PK Theater
- 2009–10: Society Says – PK Theater, 11th International Modern Dance Festival in Egypt (Gomhouria Theatre, Cairo and Sayed Darwish Theatre, Alexandria).
- 2008: MONOS – "Polychoros" Theatre of municipality of Athens, Akis Davis Theater
- 2007: The Step First Step – "Polychoros" Theatre of municipality of Athens, "Goulandris" natural history museum at Oikopolis awards
