= Murderess (film) =

2023 film directed by Eva Nathena

- Theatrical release poster
- Greek: Φόνισσα
- Directed by: Eva Nathena
- Written by: Katerina Bei
- Based on: The Murderess by Alexandros Papadiamantis
- Produced by: Kostas Lambropoulos; Dionyssis Samiotis
- Starring: Karyofyllia Karambet; Maria Protopappa; Penelope Tsilika
- Cinematography: Panagiotis Vasilakis
- Edited by: Aggela Despotidou
- Music by: Dimitris Papadimitriou
- Production companies: Tanweer Productions; View Master Films; Cosmote TV
- Distributed by: Tanweer
- Release dates: 6 November 2023 (TIFF); 1 December 2023 (Greece)
- Running time: 95 minutes
- Country: Greece
- Language: Greek

Murderess (Greek: Φόνισσα) is a 2023 Greek drama film directed by Eva Nathena in her feature debut. The film based on the 1903 social novel of the same name by Alexandros Papadiamantis, is written by Katerina Bey. The film set on a secluded Greek island around the year 1900, follows Hadoula, a woman ensnared by her mother's rejection and the suffocating grip of a patriarchal society, as she fights to carve out a life of her own.

It had its premiere at the 64th Thessaloniki International Film Festival in 'Meet the Neighbours Competition' section on 6 November 2023, where it won 6 awards including The Best Artistic Achievement Award. It was selected as the Greek entry for the Best International Feature Film at the 97th Academy Awards.

== Cast ==
- Karyofyllia Karambet as Hadoula or Frangogiannou
  - Georgianna Dalara as Hadoula at a young age
- Maria Protopappa as Delcharo, Hadoula's mother
- Penelope Tsilika as Delcharo, daughter of Hadoula
- Elena Topalidou as Amersa
- Dimitris Emellos
- Yannis Tsortekis
- Christos Stergioglou
- Maria Skoulas
- Mania Papadimitriou
- Stathis Stamoulakatos
- Christina Maxouri as Krinio
- Olga Damani
- Ersi Malikenzou
- Antonis Tsiotsiopoulos
- Niki Papandreou
- Agoritsa Economou
- Michalis Economou
- Galini Hatzipashali
- Veronica Davaki

== Release ==
Murderess had its premiere at the 64th Thessaloniki International Film Festival in 'Meet the Neighbours Competition' section on 6 November 2023.

The film was released in Greece theatres on 30 November 2023 at the Pallas Theatre in Athens. The premiere of the film was attended by then President of Greece, Katerina Sakellaropoulou.

It was submitted as Greece entry for the Best International Feature Film at the 97th Academy Awards in September 2024.

In November 2024, it competed in the Critics’ Week Competition at the Cairo International Film Festival

== Reception ==
Emilios Harbis of Kathimerini awarded the film 4 out of 4 stars and praised Murderess as a bold and meticulous debut by Eva Nathena, who adapts Alexandros Papadiamantis' classic into a dark psychological thriller. Harbis highlighted Nathena's background in set and costume design, noting that she "relies (rightly) on what she knows well" to create a wild, almost dystopian setting that reflects the bleak lives of women trapped by poverty and prejudice. The film's focus on female suffering and complex mother-daughter dynamics is central, with male characters portrayed more peripherally. Harbis described the atmosphere as "heavy, closed, collected," mirroring the emotional weight of the story. He commended Karyofyllia Karabeti's performance as Hadoula, calling it "masterful," and emphasized her ability to channel the film's theatrical tone, including a "dance of ancient tragedy," to portray a woman torn between duty and deep remorse.

== Accolades ==
The film received five awards out of a record 17 nominations in Iris Awards at the Hellenic Film Academy Awards.

Award	Date	Category	Recipient	Result	Ref.
Thessaloniki International Film Festival	12 November 2023	Best Artistic Achievement Award	Murderess	Won	
Thessaloniki International Film Festival	12 November 2023	Best Greek Film Premiered at Thessaloniki	Murderess	Won	
Thessaloniki International Film Festival	12 November 2023	Finos Film Award	Murderess	Won	
Thessaloniki International Film Festival	12 November 2023	The FISCHER Audience Award for a Meet the Neighbors competition section	Murderess	Won	
Thessaloniki International Film Festival	12 November 2023	HELLENIC BROADCASTING CORPORATION (ERT) AWARDS	Murderess	Won	
Thessaloniki International Film Festival	12 November 2023	Greek Film Centre Award (ex aequo)	Eva Natena	Won	
Shanghai International Film Festival	19 June 2024	The Belt And Road Film Week: Media Choice Award for Filmmaker	Eva Natena	Won	
Hellenic Film Academy Awards	26 June 2024	Best Cinematography	Panagiotis Vasilakis	Won	
Hellenic Film Academy Awards	26 June 2024	Best Music	Dimitris Papadimitriou	Won	
Hellenic Film Academy Awards	26 June 2024	Best Scene Design	Eva Nathena	Won	
Hellenic Film Academy Awards	26 June 2024	Best Costume Design	Eva Nathena	Won	
Hellenic Film Academy Awards	26 June 2024	Best Make-up Design, Hair and Special Effects	Evi Zafeiropoulou, Chronis Tzimos	Won	

== See also ==
- List of submissions to the 97th Academy Awards for Best International Feature Film
- List of Greek submissions for the Academy Award for Best International Feature Film
