= Sofia Kokkali =

Greek actress

Sofia Kokkali (Greek: Σοφία Κόκκαλη; Athens, 1988) is a Greek actress. Her film credits include Little England and Thread.

== Filmography ==
| Year | Title | Role | Notes |
|---|---|---|---|
| 2013 | Little England | Mosha Saltaferou | Nominee - Hellenic Film Academy Award for Best Actress |
| 2015 | Interruption | Chorus | |
| 2016 | Thread (Nima) | Niki,Lefteris | Hellenic Film Academy Award for Best Actress |
| 2019 | Winona | Meryl | |
| 2020 | Digger | Mary | |
| 2020 | Monday | Stephanie | |
| 2021 | Moon, 66 Questions (Selini, 66 erotiseis) | Artemis | |
| 2026 | Objet a | | |
