= Backdoor (film) =

- Directed by: Yorgos Tsemperopoulos
- Written by: Dennis Iliadis; Yorgos Tsemperopoulos
- Produced by: Fenia Cossovista; Amanda Livanou; Iraklis Mavroidis
- Starring: Konstandinos Papadimitriou
- Cinematography: Platon Andronidis
- Edited by: Takis Yannopoulos
- Music by: Marios Strofalis
- Release date: 6 October 2000
- Running time: 105 minutes
- Country: Greece
- Language: Greek

Backdoor (Greek: Πίσω πόρτα) is a 2000 Greek coming of age film

== Plot ==
Dimitris is a 13-year-old boy, who just lost his father. While coping with the death of this father, he also needs to cope with his mother having a new man. Besides all this he is trying to grow up and trying to be a normal teen.

== Cast ==
- Konstandinos Papadimitriou - Dimitris Kemeras
- Alexandriani Sikelianou - Foteini Kemera
- Haris Sozos - Apostolos Dedes
- Ieroklis Michaelidis - Uncle Ilias
- Antonis Kafetzopoulos - Giannis Kemeras

=== Directing ===
The movie was directed by Yorgos Tsemperopoulos for whom this was the 4th movie he directed
