= The Murderess =

1903 novel by Papadiamantis

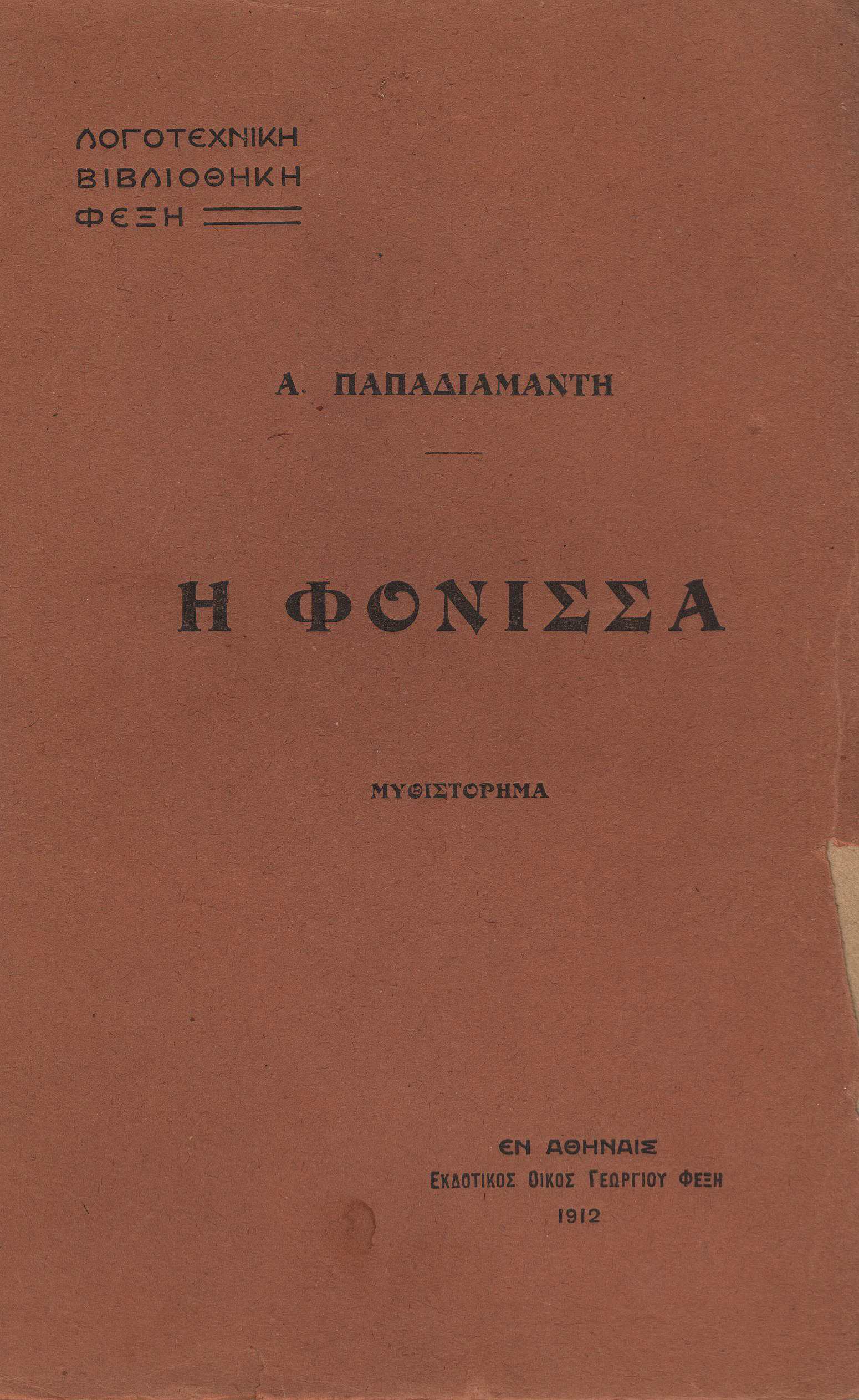
- Fonissa, cover of the first publication of the book, 1912
- Author: Alexandros Papadiamantis
- Original title: Ἡ Φόνισσα
- Language: Greek (Katharevousa)
- Genre: Social novel
- Published: "Panathenaia''
- Publication date: 1903
- Publication place: Greece

The Murderess (sometimes found as Fonissa; Greek: Ἡ Φόνισσα, romanized: Hē Fónissa) is a 1903 social novel by Greek writer Alexandros Papadiamantis. Written in the Greek katharevousa, it consists of 17 chapters and was originally published in pieces in the magazine Panathenaea from January to June 1903. The book was first published in 1912 containing five more Papadiamantis' works. A classic of Modern Greek literature, the novel has been a subject to both philological and criminological analysis. It has been praised for its use of the literary Greek language, its social commentary, as well as the unique way of introducing the reader to the criminal's psyche.

Set on the Aegean island of Skiathos, the novel narrates the story of Hadoula, an old woman living on the margins of society who accidentally strangles her infant granddaughter while attempting to stop her crying. Having lived a life in poverty and struggles, Hadoula concludes that she had, in fact, saved the baby and her family from the miseries of a woman's life. Despite the early promptings of her conscience and slowly driven into madness, the protagonist commits herself to bringing the same salvation to all the young girls of her community.

== Adaptations ==
The novel was adapted into 2023 film Murderess directed by Eva Nathena. The film was submitted as Greece entry for the Best International Feature Film at the 97th Academy Awards in September 2024.

== Sources ==
- Papadiamantis, Alexandros (2010). The Murderess. Trandlated by Peter Levi. New York Review Books. ISBN 978-1590173503.
- Merry, Bruce (2004). Encyclopedia of Modern Greek Literature. Westport, CT: Greenwood Press. ISBN 0313308136.
- Maitzen, Rohan (2014). ""Torn by the claws of reality": Alexandros Papadiamantis, The Murderess". rohanmaitzen.com.
