= Peng Yu =

Chinese actress (1934–2026)

- 彭玉
- Born: 26 January 1934; Harbin, Manchukuo
- Died: 7 October 2026 (aged 92); Zhuhai, Guangdong, China
- Occupation: Actress
- Years active: 1964–2017
- Spouse(s): Zhao Wenxin (m. 1961; died 1995) Chen Jiurong (m. 1999)
- Children: 2
- Awards: Shanghai International Film Festival; Best Actress; 2001 The Full Moon Golden Rooster Awards – Best Supporting Actress; 2001 The Full Moon

Chinese name
- Traditional Chinese: 彭玉
- Simplified Chinese: 彭玉
Transcriptions

Peng Yu (Chinese: 彭玉; pinyin: Péng Yù; 26 January 1934 – 7 October 2026) was a Chinese actress. She was known for the TV comedy A Family in Dongbei. She was awarded the Golden Rooster Award for Best Supporting Actress in 2001 for her acting in The Full Moon.

Peng died on 7 October 2026, at the age of 92.

== Selected filmography ==
=== Film ===
Year	Title	Role	Notes
1964	Don't Forget	Yao's mom	
2000	The Full Moon	Liu	Golden Goblet Award for Best Actress; Golden Rooster Award for Best Supporting Actress
2007	My Left Hand	Hu's mom	
2014	Speechless Love	Mrs. Zhang	

=== Television series ===
Year	Title	Role	Notes
2001–2002	A Family in Dongbei	Chen Jiuxiang	Two Seasons
2002	The Empty Mirror	Jiang Yuhua	
2003	Romance	Mom	
2006	Daughter in Law	Xu Shuzhen	
