= Antonis Kafetzopoulos =

Greek actor

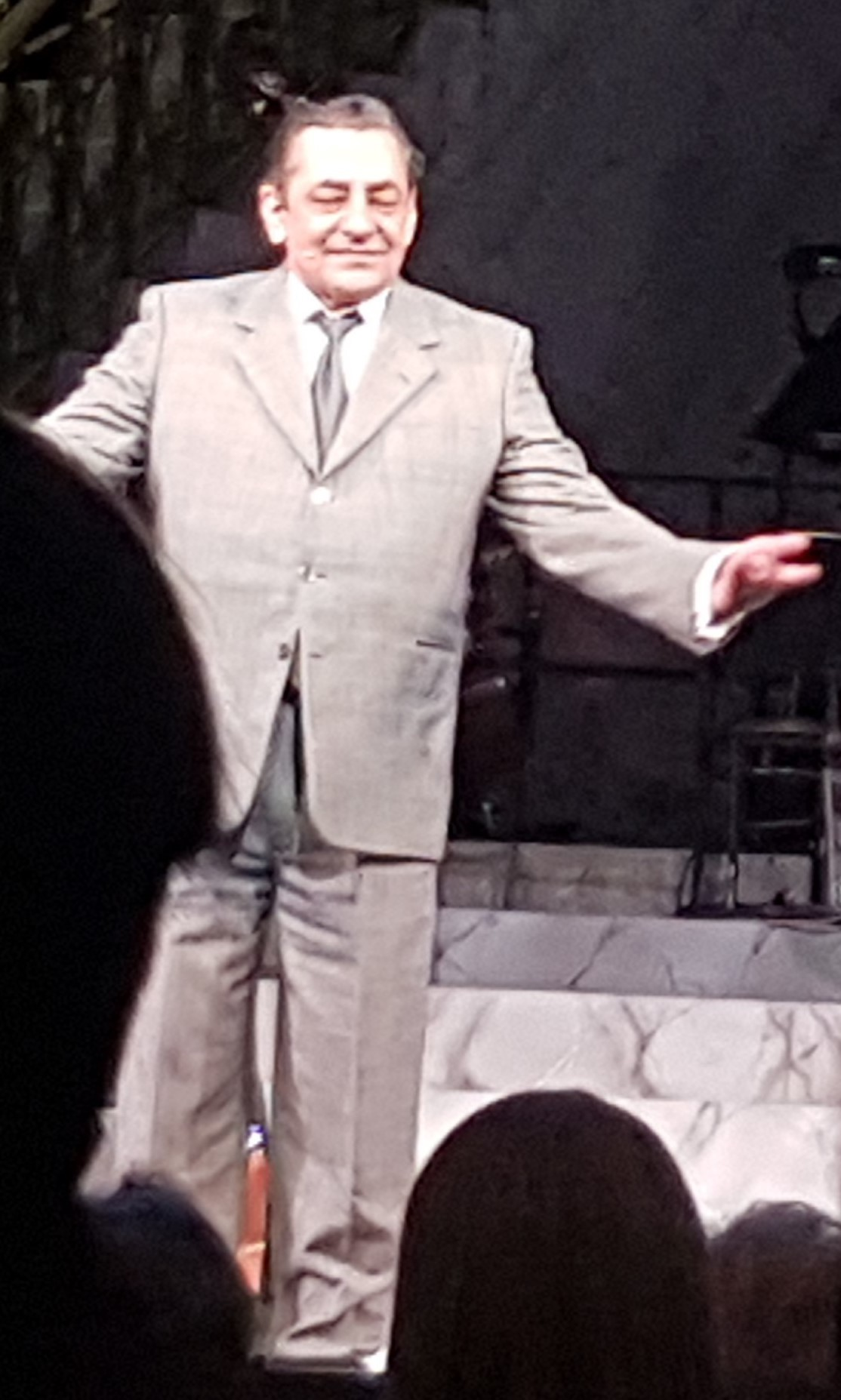
- Greek actor Antonis Kafetzopoulos at the theatrical play Searching for Attic, Palas theatre, Athens, May 2018
- Born: 13 October 1951 (age 74); Istanbul, Turkey
- Occupation: Actor
- Years active: 1980–present

Antonis Kafetzopoulos (Greek: Αντώνης Καφετζόπουλος; born 13 October 1951) is a Greek actor. He has appeared in more than fifty films since 1980. He has won two Hellenic Film Academy Awards for his roles in the films Plato's Academy and Unfair World. He also won the best actor award in San Sebastián International Film Festival for his role in Unfair World He became popular to wider audience from the successful television series Kai oi Pantremenoi Ehoun Psyhi, aired in period 1997–2000.

== Education ==
In 1969 he entered the financial and political department of the law school of the university of Thessaloniki but abandoned his studies in 1971.

== Selected filmography ==
Year	Title	Role	Notes
2021	Silent Road (Σιωπηλός δρόμος)	Spyros Karouzos	
2018	1968	Greek from Constantinople	
2012	Agon		
2011	Unfair World		Best actor award in Hellenic Film Academy Awards and San Sebastián International Film Festival
2009	Plato's Academy	Starvos	Best actor award in Locarno Film Festival and in Hellenic Film Academy Awards
2001	My Best Friend		
2000	Backdoor		
