= Little England (film) =

- Theatrical release poster
- Μικρά Αγγλία
- Directed by: Pantelis Voulgaris
- Screenplay by: Ioanna Karystiani
- Based on: Mikra Anglia by Ioanna Karystiani
- Produced by: Giannis Iakovidis
- Starring: Pinelopi Tsilika; Sofia Kokkali; Aneza Papadopoulou; Andreas Konstantinou; Maximos Moumouris; Vasilis Vasilakis; Christos Kalavrouzos
- Cinematography: Simos Sarketzis
- Edited by: Takis Giannopoulos
- Music by: Katerina Polemi
- Production companies: Mikra Anglia; Black Orange; OTE TV
- Distributed by: Feelgood Entertainment
- Release date: 5 December 2013 (Greece)
- Running time: 160 minutes
- Country: Greece
- Language: Greek
- Box office: $3,078,029

Little England (Greek: Μικρά Αγγλία, romanized: Mikra Anglia) is a 2013 Greek period romantic drama film directed by Pantelis Voulgaris. Based on the novel of the same name by Ioanna Karystiani (Voulgaris' wife) who also wrote the screenplay, it features an ensemble cast starring Pinelopi Tsilika, Sofia Kokkali, Aneza Papadopoulou and Andreas Konstantinou. The plot revolves around two sisters, Orsa and Moscha from the island of Andros, dubbed Little England because of its affluence, who are both in love with Spyros; it starts in the interwar period and ends in the 1950s.

The film achieved commercial success in Greece, as it was the second-highest-grossing film of 2013 and the first among Greek films. Little England also met critical success domestically and abroad. It was nominated for thirteen Hellenic Film Academy Awards and won six, including the award for Best Film. Internationally, it dominated at the 2014 Shanghai International Film Festival, winning three Golden Goblet Awards for Best Feature Film, Best Director and Best Actress, and it is also nominated for a Satellite Award for Best Foreign Language Film. Little England was submitted by Greece for the Best Foreign Language Film at the 87th Academy Awards, but it was not nominated.

== Plot ==
The story takes place on the island of Andros, where Orsa, 20 years old, and her younger sister, Moscha, live. Orsa is deeply in love with Spyros Maltabes, a captain's mate, but she has never revealed her secret to anybody. On the other hand, Moscha dreams of leaving Andros and escaping women's usual fate of marrying sailors who are usually away from their families. Their mother, Mina, married to a captain herself, considers love to be troublesome and, overriding her daughters' wishes, wants her daughters to enter marriages to ensure their material prosperity. As a result, Orsa marries captain Nikos Vatokouzis, and Moscha marries Spyros Maltabes, the very man her sister is in love with who is now a captain. The two women live in the family's duplex home and the forbidden love will harm their lives.

== Cast ==
- Pinelopi Tsilika as Orsa Saltaferou
- Sofia Kokkali as Moscha Saltaferou
- Aneza Papadopoulou as Mina Saltaferou
- Andreas Konstantinou as Spyros Maltabes
- Maximos Moumouris as Nikos Vatokouzis
- Vasilis Vasilakis as Savvas Saltaferos
- Christos Kalavrouzos as uncle Aimilios

== Release ==
The film was released in Greece on 5 December 2013. It was also screened twice as a closing film at the 36th Cairo International Film Festival on 17 and 18 November 2014.

== Reception ==
=== Box office ===
Little England was a major hit in Greece, where it grossed $3,078,029, making it the second-highest-grossing film of 2013 in the country behind only The Hobbit: The Desolation of Smaug. The film grossed $537,314 in its opening weekend and topped the box office, while it stayed in the top four in the following six weekends.

=== Critical response ===
Boyd van Hoeij of The Hollywood Reporter describes the film as "A woman's picture in the best sense of the word" and a "handsomely mounted and impeccably acted film."

=== Accolades ===
Little England dominated at the 2014 Hellenic Film Academy Awards, where it received thirteen nominations and finally won six awards, including that for Best Film. The film met great success at the 2014 Shanghai International Film Festival, where it was also announced as the Best Feature Film and won two more Golden Goblet Awards. The film was selected as the Greek entry for the Best Foreign Language Film at the 87th Academy Awards.

Award	Date of ceremony	Category	Recipients and nominees	Result
Hellenic Film Academy Awards	14 April 2014	Best Film	Little England	Won
Hellenic Film Academy Awards	14 April 2014	Best Screenplay	Ioanna Karystiani	Nominated
Hellenic Film Academy Awards	14 April 2014	Best Actress	Pinelopi Tsilika	Nominated
Hellenic Film Academy Awards	14 April 2014	Best Actress	Sofia Kokkali	Nominated
Hellenic Film Academy Awards	14 April 2014	Best Supporting Actor	Christos Kalavrouzos	Nominated
Hellenic Film Academy Awards	14 April 2014	Best Cinematography	Simos Sarketzis	Won
Hellenic Film Academy Awards	14 April 2014	Best Editing	Takis Giannopoulos	Nominated
Hellenic Film Academy Awards	14 April 2014	Best Music	Katerina Polemi	Nominated
Hellenic Film Academy Awards	14 April 2014	Best Scenography	Antonis Daglidis	Won
Hellenic Film Academy Awards	14 April 2014	Best Costume Design	Gioula Zoiopoulou	Won
Hellenic Film Academy Awards	14 April 2014	Best Sound	Stefanos Efthymiou, Kostas Varybobiotis and Takis Giannopoulos	Won
Hellenic Film Academy Awards	14 April 2014	Best Make-up	Evi Zafiropoulou	Won
Hellenic Film Academy Awards	14 April 2014	Best Special Effects and Cinematic Innovation	Antonis Kotzias and Antonis Nikolaou	Nominated
Satellite Awards	15 February 2015	Best Foreign Language Film	Little England	Nominated
Shanghai International Film Festival	22 June 2014	Best Feature Film	Little England	Won
Shanghai International Film Festival	22 June 2014	Best Director	Pantelis Voulgaris	Won
Shanghai International Film Festival	22 June 2014	Best Actress	Pinelopi Tsilika	Won

== See also ==
- List of submissions to the 87th Academy Awards for Best Foreign Language Film
- List of Greek submissions for the Academy Award for Best Foreign Language Film
