= Unfair World =

2011 film

- Directed by: Filippos Tsitos
- Written by: Filippos Tsitos; Dora Masklavanou
- Produced by: Alexandra Boussiou
- Starring: Antonis Kafetzopoulos
- Cinematography: Polidefkis Kirlidis
- Music by: Josepha van der Schoot
- Distributed by: Feelgood
- Release dates: 21 September 2011 (San Sebastián); 9 November 2011 (Greece)
- Running time: 107 minutes
- Country: Greece
- Language: Greek

Unfair World (Greek: Άδικος Κόσμος, translit. Adikos kosmos) is a 2011 Greek drama film directed by Filippos Tsitos.

Tsitos won the award for Best Director and Antonis Kafetzopoulos won the award for Best Actor at the San Sebastián International Film Festival. The film was selected as the Greek entry for the Best Foreign Language Oscar at the 85th Academy Awards, but it did not make the final shortlist. The film also won the Best Film award at the 3rd Hellenic Film Academy Awards.

== Cast ==
- Antonis Kafetzopoulos as Sotiris
- Christos Stergioglou as Minas
- Theodora Tzimou as Dora
- Minas Hatzisavvas
- Efthymis Papadimitriou as Dimitriou (as Makis Papadimitriou)
- Yorgos Souxes as Inspector
- Laya Yourgou as 40-year-old woman
- Myrna Tsapa as Georgia
- Sofia Seirli as Lena

== See also ==
- List of submissions to the 85th Academy Awards for Best Foreign Language Film
- List of Greek submissions for the Academy Award for Best Foreign Language Film
