= Filippos Tsitos =

Greek film and television director (born 1966)

- Born: 1966 (age 58–59); Kypseli, Athens, Greece
- Occupation: Film director
- Known for: Unfair World

Filippos Tsitos (born 1966) is a Greek film and television director. He grew up in Exarchia and Chalandri, moving to Berlin, Germany in 1991, where he studied directing at the German Academy of Cinema and Television. He has won the Silver Shell Award at the San Sebastian International Film Festival for his film Unfair World.

== Selected works ==
- Tatort (2002–2010) 5 episodes
- Plato's Academy (2009)
- Unfair World (2011)
