= Plato's Academy (film) =

2009 Greek-German comedy-drama film

- Directed by: Filippos Tsitos
- Written by: Alexis Kardaras
- Produced by: Thanassis Karathanos; Moriatis Konstantinos
- Starring: Antonis Kafetzopoulos; Anastas Kozdine; Titika Saringouli; Giorgos Souxes; Kostas Koronaios; Panayiotis Stamatakis; Maria Zorba
- Cinematography: Polidefkis Kirlidis
- Edited by: Dimitris Peponis
- Music by: Stavros Markonis
- Production companies: Pan Entertainment; Twenty Twenty Vision
- Release dates: 13 August 2009 (Locarno Film Festival); 15 October 2009 (Greece)
- Running time: 103 minutes
- Countries: Greece; Germany
- Languages: Greek; Albanian; German

Plato's Academy (Greek: Ακαδημία Πλάτωνος) is a 2009 Greek-German comedy-drama film directed by Filippos Tsitos, starring Antonis Kafetzopoulos, Anastas Kozdine, Titika Saringouli, Giorgos Souxes, Kostas Koronaios, Panayiotis Stamatakis and Maria Zorba.

== Cast ==
- Antonis Kafetzopoulos as Stavros
- Anastas Kozdine as Marenglen
- Titika Saringouli as Harikleia
- Giorgos Souxes as Nikos
- Kostas Koronaios as Argyris
- Panayiotis Stamatakis as Thymios
- Maria Zorba as Dina
- Platonas Brakoulias
- Maria Stefou
- Konstadina Tzortzi
- Nikos Zoiopoulos

== Release ==
The film premiered at the 2009 Locarno Festival and was a finalist for the 2010 Lux Prize.

== Reception ==
Joseph Proimakis of Cineuropa wrote that the film "mercilessly bites into one of the darkest traits of any modern multicultural society and turns it on its head, all the while holding onto its humanistic sensibilities and maintaining a delicate balance between the universal social commentary and the specificity of the hero’s story."

Kirk Honeycutt of The Hollywood Reporter wrote that the film offers "wry wisdom and steady laughs in its acute observation about a formerly heterogeneous society’s confrontation with otherness."

Jay Weissberg of Variety called the film a "weak comedy with few laughs and little insight."
