= Objet a (film) =

2026 drama film

- Directed by: Ann Oren
- Written by: Ann Oren; Geoffroy Grison
- Produced by: Kristof Gerega; Fabian Altenried; Sophie Ahrens
- Starring: Aenne Schwarz; Louis Hofmann; Simone Bucio; Georg Friedrich; Sofia Kokkali
- Cinematography: Juan Sarmiento G.
- Edited by: Hansjörg Weißbrich
- Music by: Kyan Bayani
- Production companies: Schuldenberg Films; Tarantula; asterisk*
- Distributed by: Grandfilm
- Release date: 11 August 2026 (Locarno)
- Running time: 95 minutes
- Countries: Germany; Luxembourg; Greece
- Language: German

Objet a is a 2026 internationally co-produced drama film directed by Ann Oren, from a screenplay by Oren and Geoffroy Grison. It stars Aenne Schwarz, Louis Hofmann, Simone Bucio, Georg Friedrich and Sofia Kokkali.

It had its world premiere at the 79th Locarno Film Festival on 11 August 2026, where it competed for the Golden Leopard.

== Premise ==
Ingeborg and Adam are hand surgeons bound by love, control, and fixations. Ingeborg is compelled to steal objects while Adam longs to become one.

== Cast ==
- Aenne Schwarz as Ingeborg
- Louis Hofmann as Adam
- Simone Bucio
- Georg Friedrich
- Sofia Kokkali

== Production ==
In July 2025, it was announced Aenne Schwarz, Louis Hofmann, Simone Bucio and Georg Friedrich had joined the cast of the film, with Ann Oren directing from a screenplay co-written with Geoffroy Grison. Principal photography concluded that same month.

== Release ==
It had its world premiere at the 79th Locarno Film Festival on 11 August 2026, where it competed for the Golden Leopard. Prior to, Oscilloscope Laboratories acquired US distribution rights to the film. Grandfilm will distribute in Germany.
