= Aneza Papadopoulou =

Greek actress (1955–2022)

Aneza Papadopoulou (Greek: Ανέζα Παπαδοπούλου; Kifissia, 30 March 1955 – 8 July 2022) was a Greek Actor.

== Biography ==
Papadopoulou was born in 1955 in the Athenian suburb of Kifissia. She entered the Drama School of the National Theatre of Northern Greece and in 1974 she made her stage debut. She appeared at the National Theatre of Northern Greece for approximately two decades and she participated in a total of 19 theatrical performances, including, Germa by Federico García Lorca where she performed the title role, Mother Courage and Her Children by Bertolt Brecht, appeared as Bubi Katerina, and The Opera of the Five by Bertolt Brecht, playing the role of Polly.

At the same time, she has also collaborated with theatrical institutions the National Theatre of Greece and the Attis Theatre included. She performed in theatrical plays such as Samuel Beckett's Happy Days (2020), Euripides' Ion (2003) and Bacchae (2017), Sophocles' Antigone (2016), Robert Bolt's A Man for All Seasons (2014) and others. Her last appearance was in Samuel Beckett's Happy Days, in 2020, at Attis Theatre.

She also appeared in the films 120 decibels (1987), Shoulder for Hire (2007), Real Life (2004) and Little England (2013), which is considered as her top performance, while she also appeared on television series.

Papadopoulou died of cancer on July 8, 2022.

== Selected filmography ==
- Georgios Vizyinos: I siopi ton angelon (2000. TV series) ... Tourkessa
- Real Life (2004) .... Alexandra's & Nikos mother
- Little England (2013) ... Mina Saltaferou
