= Silent Road =

Greek television crime drama series

- Also known as: Σιωπηλός Δρόμος, La strada del silenzio
- Genre: Crime drame, thriller
- Created by: Petros Kalkovalis, Melina Tsabani
- Screenplay by: Petros Kalkovalis, Melina Tsabani
- Directed by: Vardis Marinakis
- Starring: Penelope Tsilika; Dimitris Lalos; Christos Loulis; Anthi Efstratiadou; Antonis Kafetzopoulos
- Music by: Ted Regklis
- Country of origin: Greece
- Original language: Greek
- No. of seasons: 1
- No. of episodes: 13

Production
- Producers: Nikolas Alavanos, Pathi Katsoufi
- Running time: 46–60 minutes
- Production company: Filmiki

Original release
- Network: Mega Channel
- Release: 4 April – 4 July 2021

Silent Road or Σιωπηλός Δρόμος is a Greek television crime thriller, which was broadcast from 4 April 2021. It was created by Petros Kalkovalis and Melina Tsabani, who co-wrote the screenplay. All thirteen episodes were directed by Vardis Marinakis up to the final episode on 4 July 2021 for Mega Channel. Silent Road stars Penelope Tsilika as the journalist Thaleia, Dimitris Lalos as detective captain Nasos, Christos Loulis as quarry manager Vasilis, Anthi Efstratiadou as his wife Athina and Antonis Kafetzopoulos as her father and quarry owner Spyros. Main focus of the story is the investigation into the kidnapping of nine primary school children, their bus driver and teaching assistant. Initially the kidnappers would only communicate with Thaleia.

== Premise ==
In the wealthy Athens suburb of Vathi, Attica, nine primary school children are kidnapped from their mini-bus with the driver Savvas and teaching assistant Elpida. Nasos heads the police investigation with Maya's assistance. The kidnappers' boss contacts journalist Thaleia using a voice scrambler. Thaleia is the aunt of two children, Alkis and Aristea, who are also grandchildren of her father and prominent businessman, Spyros. Kidnappers ask for an outrageously high amount, which even rich parents are unable to raise. When Alkis's parents Manto and Nikitas announce they will pay a lesser amount, kidnappers increase their ransom demand. Aristea's parents, Athina and Vasilis, had argued against Manto's announcement. Nasos suspects Thaleia's involvement, but she is cleared. He also theorises that kidnappers are not motivated by money but revenge.

School principal Violeta downplays fractious issues with bullying students. One student, Spyros's son Orpheus plans to use a gun to scare his bully and also threatens harm to the school community. Orpheus is arrested for illegal firearms purchase. Petrol station attendant, Mihalos re-encounters former girlfriend, Thaleia. The abductees are held in the basement of an isolated house, where Elpida and Savvas care for them. Three of the kidnappers are eventually revealed as former commandos: Mihalos, Sakis and Fani. Savvas enables Aristea to briefly escape the house, before Fani chases her down. Meanwhile, Sakis scuffles with Savvas, who is shot dead. After Savvas's corpse is discovered, Nasos identifies Mihalis and his team surveil Mihalis to find the others, however Mihalis evades them. Nasos's superiors exclude Thaleia and replaced her with experienced negotiator Dimos. Thaleia and Nasos start an affair. Kidnappers contact Thaleia, again, to direct her to a 26-year-old car accident, which was faked by Spyros to cover up the quarry death of one of his workers.

The victim's son, Iasonas soon became an orphan, then a disturbed youth and later a drug addict. Mihalis is Iasonas's childhood friend, and a year earlier agreed to make Spyros and the Vathi community suffer. The pair plot the children's kidnapping. Seven years ago, Iasonas had renamed himself, Vasilis. He worked for Spyros and even married the favoured daughter, Athina and raised Aristea. Meanwhile, Alkis becomes ill with an intestinal tapeworm, which kidnappers treat with antibiotics. Alkis does not improve, so Mihalis takes him towards hospital. Mihalis is arrested en route. Initially, Mihalis refuses to assist Nasos's investigation. Vasilis/Iasonas kills Aristea's biological father, Petros to hide his addiction and gun ownership. Vasilis decides to extort money and flee; he fakes a message from the kidnappers to fool Athina into paying for Aristea's release. Vasilis, at the kidnappers' house, kills Sakis and Fani and abducts Aristea. Police arrive following Alkis's descriptions and rescue Elpida and the remaining eight children. Vasilis is stopped at an aerodrome, where he holds a sedated Aristea hostage in a car while he clutches a live grenade.

== Cast and characters ==
=== Main cast ===
- Penelope Tsilika as Thaleia Karouzou: freelance journalist; Margarita and Spyros's estranged daughter, Athina's sister
- Dimitris Lalos as Nasos Oikonomidis: Major Crimes Unit detective captain
- Christos Loulis as Vasilis Totsis né Iasonas Tsimakis: quarry manager; Athina's second husband. Kyriaki, Leonidas's son
- Anthi Efstratiadou as Athina Karouzou: doctor; Thaleia's sister, Aristea's mother
- Antonis Kafetzopoulos as Spyros Karouzos: quarry owner, family's patriarch; Thaleia, Athina and Orpheus's father
- Marissa Triandafyllidou as Ioulia Xenou: Spyros's second wife, Orpheus's mother
- Vicky Papadopoulou as Manto Karouzou: Thaleia's cousin, Nikitas's wife, Alkis's mother
- Giannos Perlegkas as Nikitas Gkekas: local mayor, former quarry manager; Manto's husband, Alkis's father
- Myrto Alikaki as Violeta Fotopoulou: school principal; Danae's mother
- Christina Cheila-Fameli as Elpida Giannari: teaching assistant
- Nikolas Papagiannis as Mihalis Topalis: 36-year-old petrol station attendant, former commando; Thaleia's long ago boyfriend
- Dimitris Darras as Orpheus: secondary student; Spyros, Ioulia's son, Thaleia's half-brother
- Danai Nielsen as Danae: secondary student, Orpheus's contemporary; Violeta's daughter
- Giorgos Triantafyllidis as Sakis Zamanis: drug trafficker, former commando; Fani's boyfriend
- Sofia Georgovassili as Fani Dokou: criminal, former commando; Sakis's girlfriend
- Smaragda Adamopoulou as Maya Stavrou: police lieutenant, Nasos's subordinate
- Takis Sakellariou as Savvas Kanellopoulos: school bus driver

=== Recurring cast ===
- Anna Maria Marinaki as Aristea: school girl; Athina, Petros's daughter
- Apollonas Stavros Xarhakos as Alkis: school boy; Aristea's cousin, Nikitas, Manto's son
- Michele Valley as "Mihalis' mother"/Mrs Fotini: former music teacher, has dementia, terminal illness
- Dimitris Xanthopoulos as Astynomos Dimos (English: Captain Dimos)/Dimosthenis Tsakiris: police captain, trained negotiator
- Giannis Dalianis as Astynomikos Diefthintis (English: Detective Chief Diefthintis): police chief, Nasos's boss
- Simeon Tsakiris as Apostolos Kourtidis: National Intelligence Service officer, directs IT and surveillance
- Stathis Mantzoros as Iraklis Mischos: businessman, Spyros's sometime partner, school's benefactor, Zisis's father
- Alex Moukanos as Thanasis Petridis: club owner, former police detective, investigated Leonidas's death
- Asterios Peltekis as Petros: international businessman; Athina's ex-husband, Aristea's father

== Production ==
Σιωπηλός δρόμος was produced by Nikolas Alavanos and Pathi Katsoufi for the Greek company, Filmiki Productions. It was filmed in Athens and Eleusis. Its title references the German legend of "Pied Piper of Hamelin", who steals children after townsfolk refuse to pay his fee. The piper takes the children along a silent road where they are not allowed to have music or dance. The series premiered in Greece via Mega Channel from 4 April 2021 to 4 July. It was shown in Cyprus via Alpha Cyprus from September 2021. Worldwide distribution rights were bought by Beta Film.

In Italy, as La strada del silenzio, it was broadcast from 13 July 2022 via Canale 5. Under its English title, Silent Road, the distributors gained the interest of foreign television networks. United States company Topic bought the series for its North American market. It was streamed in the US and Canada from 3 March 2023.

== Episode guide ==
.

No. in season	Title	Directed by	Written by	Original release date
1	"Lost Signal" (Χαμένο Στίγμα)	Vardis Marinakis	Petros Kalkovalis, Melina Tsabani	4 April 2021
Flashback: Woman reads "Pied Piper" to child. Present: Family celebrates Spyros's birthday. Thaleia ignores Athina's calls. Next day, children board bus, followed by kidnappers' white van. Thaleia applies for newspaper job. She hears of missing school bus. Athina arrives at school. Violeta addresses parents: police investigating missing bus, no signal. Nasos: nine children, driver Savvas, teaching assistant Elpida onboard. Spyros to Thaleia: Aristea, Alkis on bus. Kidnappers jam phone signals, board bus, direct Savvas off route. Nikitas frustrated by police incompetence. Nikitas, Vasilis follow bus route. Thaleia greets Orpheus. Vasilis to Nikitas: divorcing from Athina. Maya will research Savvas, Elpida. Mihalis: leave mobiles on bus. People transferred to blue van. Sakis drives white van to dump site, sets it on fire; leaves on motorcycle. Nasos prevents Thaleia's entry into school. Nasos to parents: children abducted, must not contact media. Later, police discover burnt out van. Vasilis to police: recognised from this morning; did not see people clearly. Spyros orders Thaleia to leave family home. Police review CCTV of van's occupants: no distinct image. Police discover school bus. Children, Elpida, Savvas descend into basement area. Kidnappers lock them under hatch. Elpida: we are staying here, now. Kidnapper phones Thaleia: 100 million€ for children.
2	"The Magic Flute" (Ο Μαγικός Αυλός)	Vardis Marinakis	Petros Kalkovalis, Melina Tsabani	11 April 2021
Nasos, Maya interview Thaleia for hours; suspicious of kidnappers contact. Nasos asks about Aristea's near drowning, two years earlier. Thaleia was drinking, poorly supervised Aristea. Athina saved Aristea. Nasos to Chief: Elpida, Savvas cleared; still researching parents, Thaleia. Thaleia agrees to have her phone tapped; she remains at station. Kidnappers watch TV news. Mihalis provides medication for child. Nikitas contacts media. Petros arrives, consoles Athina. Elpida asks for toilet cleaning products, which Mihalis purchases. Spyros advises family to appoint spokesperson; they agree on Vasilis. Petros stays at Athina's. When kidnapper phones, Nasos asks about children; kidnapper refuses to talk. Nasos annoys Thaleia by insistence that kidnappers know her. Athina, Manto share memories of their children. Elpida cleans toilet; asks Sakis: children need exercise, activities. Nasos queries Athina, Spyros about suspicious activities. Nasos reveals kidnappers contacted Thaleia. Mihalis visits his mother. Spyros describes Thaleia as problem child; especially after Margarita died. Nasos asks Spyros to let Thaleia stay at his home for convenience. Athina slaps Thaleia. Sakis, Fani have sex. Mihalis leaves for night shift. Children scream at mouse, Sakis removes it. Kidnapper cites "Pied Piper"; insists on full ransom amount. Vasilis drives Petros home via Mihalis's workplace.
3	"Proof of Life" (Απόδειξη Ζωής)	Vardis Marinakis	Petros Kalkovalis, Melina Tsabani	18 April 2021
Police alert supermarkets for specific purchases. Apostolos liaises with Nasos. Athina stops going to work, Vasilis goes to quarry. Police follow Thaleia, while she jogs. Violeta asks Danae to run errands; parents unenrol students. Parents vilify Athina, Manto upon learning kidnappers contacted Thaleia. Mihalis hands scissors, activity books to Elpida. Public tip: consider former bus driver, Filippov. Violeta: Filippov fired after shoving Zisis. Zisis attacked Filippov who stopped Zisis's bullying. Zisis's father is Iraklis. Nasos: found gun at Filippov's. Savvas hides scissors. Sakis, Mihalis argue over time-off. Orpheus helps friend, Filippov's son, Christos. Danae confronts Violeta over mortgaging their assets. Nasos, Maya seek bullied students. Spyros disbelieves Orpheus's illness. Orpheus deletes files from computer. Thaleia views videos of Margarita. Athina's anxiety disrupts her eating. Athina begs Thaleia to ask kidnappers to bring Aristea home. Thaleia demands kidnappers provide proof of life. Athina collapses. Elpida collects children's crafts, one scissors missing. Children cannot find them. Sakis brandishes gun at children: find scissors! Mihalis encounters Thaleia on street; invites her to meet. Nasos questions Christos about gun. Orpheus asks Thaleia's help. Sakis grills Elpida, Savvas about scissors. Mihalis orders kidnappers to return hostages to basement. Police view children's video messages to parents.
4	"Haters" (Μισητές)	Vardis Marinakis	Petros Kalkovalis, Melina Tsabani	25 April 2021
Six days before kidnapping: Orpheus practises shooting Christos's gun. Day Four after kidnapping: Christos to police: found gun. Iraklis refuses to allow police question Zisis about bullying. Vasilis to Athina: Thaleia may not know kidnappers. Thaleia drives Orpheus to derelict factory. Orpheus cleans up Christos's mess. Thaleia sees bullet casings. Orpheus: Violeta protected bully, Zisis. Manto addresses parents: offer kidnappers money. Vasilis, Athina against paying: follow police advice. Savvas has children dancing, Alkis plays piano. Maya: Thaleia left home without phone. Orpheus: Danae described Iraklis, Violeta's affair. Violeta hid threatening messages. Manto: police want criminals, not save children. Nasos: kidnappers may get ransom, but ask for more. Thaleia to police: visited friend. Spyros berates Orpheus for being uncommicative. Nasos drives Thaleia to factory, using her car's tracker. Thaleia: went there with Mihalos. Ioulia, Spyros argue over Orpheus. Nasos asks to meet Mihalis. Danae to Nasos: threatening messages. Thaleia asks Mihalis: provide alibi. Nikitas, Manto publicly ask kidnappers to accept 40 million, return children. Maya: kidnappers raised ransom to 150 million. Manto's shattered. Sakis, Fani argue with Mihalis: should accept 40 million. Mihalis: boss increased ransom. Mihalis views hostages on CCTV. Savvas uses scissors to loosen screws on ventilation grate. Apostolos: threats from Orpheus.
5	"Sins of the Fathers" (Αμαρτίες Γονέων)	Vardis Marinakis	Petros Kalkovalis, Melina Tsabani	9 May 2021
Day Five: Vasilis, Spyros supervise quarry workers. Danae scolds Violeta for misinforming police. Nasos interviews Orpheus about gun, threatening emails. Spyros's lawyer stops questioning. Nasos: CCTV of Orpheus in passenger seat. Thaleia admits to driving Orpheus. Mihalis gives Sakis, Fani 100,000€ from boss. Savvas levers screw out. Reporter: two minors planned kidnapping? Fellow parents throw rocks at Spyros's home. Day 15: Ioulia visits Orpheus in jail. Parents meet without Karouzos family. Manto apologises to Athina over ransom argument. Councillors ask Nikitas to quit. Police hear kidnapper's call. Nasos: he wants vengeance against community. Police commissioner replaces Thaleia with Dimos. Savvas shows Elpidas grating: nearly removable. Athina to Spyros: divorcing Vasilis. Day 22: Orpheus returned home; receives death threats. Thaleia visits Mihalos. His mother does not recognise Thaleia. Elpida: children require healthy food. Kidnappers strike Elpida. Ioulia berates Spyros for shunning Orpheus, same as he treats Thaleia. Orpheus leaves via window. Savvas, Elpida put Aristea into ventilation system. Abductee's parent attacks Orpheus. Aristea breaks through second grate, Mihalis hears noise, wakes fellow kidnappers, enters basement. Sakis confronts Savvas, Mihalis finds Elpida at missing grate. Savvas fights Sakis, who shoots Savvas dead. Aristea leaves tunnel, runs along railway line. Mihalis phones boss.
6	"Silent Road" (Σιωπηλός Δρόμος)	Vardis Marinakis	Petros Kalkovalis, Melina Tsabani	16 May 2021
Aristea runs from Fani, but is caught. Mihalis, Sakis set Savvas's corpse afire. Aristea returns, sees Savvas's blood: blames herself. Orpheus refuses to describe attacker. Attacker confesses to police: got angry when Orpheus ran away. Spyros wants him prosecuted: Ioulia does not. Ioulia takes Orpheus to Rhodes. Nasos, Maya attend Savvas's corpse; inform his wife. Nasos addresses squad, find where clothing was bought. Dimos plays kidnapper's calls; keeps asking for Thaleia; threatens to kill hostages. Nasos: kidnapper has personal motives. Chief: get kidnappers to accept 55 million ransom. Day 25: Savvas's funeral. Community holds vigil with school children. Athina, Vasilis argue about impending separation. Police learn clothing sold in many stores. Thaleia, families attend vigil. Mihalis joins Thaleia. Nasos approaches, Mihalis departs. Elpida: no food eaten; berates unremorseful kidnappers. Sakis removes Alkis despite Elpida's objections. Thaleia to Nasos: Spyros relieved when Margarita died. Thaleia, Nasos have sex. Athina, Nikitas kiss. Day 26: Mihalis shops for groceries, sees police, leaves. Kidnapper phones Thaleia; she hears Alkis's voice. "Silent Road" refers to Pied Piper story. Vasilis: Athina photographed kissing Nikitas. Thaleia finds newspaper article at children's memorial. Article describes 26-year-old vehicle accident. Police attend supermarket; they have CCTV of shopper, who abandoned trolley.
7	"Family Affair" (Οικογενειακή Υπόθεση)	Vardis Marinakis	Petros Kalkovalis, Melina Tsabani	23 May 2021
Manto, Nikitas interviewed on TV. Athina alerts Nikitas. Nasos: suspect named, Mihalis. Mihalis to kidnappers: situation ends soon. Elpida: children write parents' letter. Aristea refuses. Nikitas to Manto: affair with Athina. Chief: pick up Thaleia. Nasos, Maya question Thaleia; collect article. Manto: Nikitas to leave. Police surveil Mihalis. Vasilis to Manto: suspected Athina's cheating. Athina informs Spyros, who denigrates her. Mihalis cannot convince mother to eat. Elpida asks Fani to post children's letters. Thaleia determines reporter from newspaper's archives. Vasilis threatens to reveal Nikitas's illegal activities. Sakis promises Aristea to send letters. Reporter, Ilias to Thaleia: driver Leonidas, had worked for Spyros. Mihalis leaves work, police follow. Mihalis phones boss, police record them. Ilias has recordings of Leonidas's wife, Kyriaki. Kyriaki: husband dressed in different clothes. Thaleia: Leonidas died at work, accident staged to coverup? Ilias: Kyriaki died year later, left son orphaned. Vasilis's thrown food onto floor. Athina cleans up. Sakis burns letters. Athina confesses to Manto, Manto slashes own wrist. Thaleia visits Thanasis's club. Thanasis does not appear. Spyros warns Vasilis not to expose Nikitas; slaps Vasilis, threatens to ruin him. Police follow Mihalis towards hostages, but stops for phone call. Mihalis turns back, passes police vehicles.
8	"Old Stories" (Παλιές Ιστορίες)	Vardis Marinakis	Petros Kalkovalis, Melina Tsabani	30 May 2021
Year earlier: Vasilis, Athina have sex, but he's too rough. Vasilis sees Athina kissing Nikitas. Present: Mihalis visits mother hospitalised with pneumonia. Nasos to Chief: had sex with Thaleia, signs resignation form. Chief: stay until case closed. Thanasis to Thaleia: Kyriaki made false accusations. Mihalis realises he was followed; destroys SIMs. Sakis unable to phone Mihalis. Manto exits treatment, sees Athina departing. Police bug Mihalis's home. Vasilis to Thaleia; Athina, Nikitas's affair. Day 27: Children celebrate Alkis's birthday. Sakis, Fani let children play outside. Thaleia provides recording: Kyriaki describes poor investigation; Maya to follow up. Thaleia dissatisfied with police's underwhelming response. Parents irate over lack of information from Dimos. Mihalis returns home, collects bag. Iraklis to Spyros: Thaleia prying into accident. Violeta to Maya: Kyriaki fired after Leonidas's death: erratic work, claimed staged accident. Mihalis returns to hospital. Maya: kidnappers blame Spyros for disguising Leonidas's death, Kyriaki's firing. Maya: their son, Iasonas, no trace for 25 years. Vasilis shows Thaleia: Spyros's illegal quarrying. Spyros made fortune, corrupted politicians, police. Vasilis: describes recent quarry accident; worker paid off. Mihalis sneaks out of hospital. Orphanage director to Maya: Iasonas problematic, scalded playmate, ran away. Mihalis meets Iasonas: it's Vasilis.
9	"The Pied Piper" (Ο Αυλητής)	Vardis Marinakis	Petros Kalkovalis, Melina Tsabani	6 June 2021
Flashback: Kyriaki reads "Pied Piper" to child, Iasonas. 25 years ago: Young Iasonas visits Kyriaki's grave. He's sent to orphanage, scalds playmate, runs away. Seven years ago: Iasonas on drugs, joins rehab centre's therapy group, invents back-story. At centre, Iasonas meets childhood friend, Mihalis who was recently discharged as commando. Mihalis asks Iasonas to visit his mother Mrs Fotini, who recognises former music student, Iasonas. She hands over Kyriaki's files to Iasonas, who learns of Spyros's manipulations: disguising Leonidas's quarry death as vehicle collision; having Kyriaki fired, vilifying her as crazy. Iasonas renames himself as Vasilis to infiltrate Spyros's inner circle. He recruits Mihalis to help seek revenge on Vathi community. Vasilis becomes quarry driver, meets Athina; becomes quarry digger. Vasilis feigns itchiness to be treated by Athina. Vasilis, Athina start dating; they kiss. He continues reinventing his back-story; becomes quarry manager. Vasilis, Athina marry. Present: Vasilis hides Mihalis in car boot; passes police checkpoint. Two years ago: quarry digger, Yerasimos injured in tunnel collapse. Vasilis told to placate him; make Yerasimos accept payout for silence. Vasilis frequents prostitutes for rough sex, sporadically takes drugs. He maltreats Athina; learns Athina's cheating. Athina, Vasilis attend school children performing "Pied Piper" play.
10	"Countdown" (Αντίστροφη Μέτρηση)	Vardis Marinakis	Petros Kalkovalis, Melina Tsabani	13 June 2021
Spyros scoffs at Athina; kidnapping unrelated to Leonidas's accident. Thaleia warns Syros to inform police. Spyros kicks Thaleia out; Athina follows. Police find Iasonas's photo at Mihalis's. Mihalis to Vasilis: accept 40 million. Vasilis: more time to finalise arrangements. Maya: Mihalis, Iasonas were childhood friends. Vasilis to kidnappers: will accept ransom. Chief willing to enact Nasos's resignation. Nasos threatens to expose Chief's blocking investigation. Police question Spyros: Kyriaki went crazy, ask police investigators. Thanasis: visited quarry next day. Maya: Thanasis waited ten days, evidence long gone. Spyros recalls Mihalis. Nikitas to Athina: illegal quarrying for decades. Thaleia to police: met Mihalis few times, visited Fotini. Nasos: Mihalis's kidnapper. Vasilis contacts Nasos: accept 70 million. Nasos: know you are Iasonas; need time to raise money. Elpida reports Alkis's abdominal pain to Mihalis. Police unable to catch Iasonas. Thaleia tells Athina about Mihalis. Manto to Nikitas: after Alkis returns, we get divorce; will contest custody. Athina describes Vasilis's drug taking episode. Spyros meets Athina, Vasilis, Thaleia, Nikitas. Spyros: remain untied as family, but he continues lying about quarry accidents. Fotini to Nasos: Iasonas visited last month. Manto to Dimos: evidence of malpractices by Nikitas, Spyros. Vasilis gives Mihalis antibiotics for Alkis; Mihalis: he needs doctor.
11	"Animal Instinct" (Ζωώδες Ένστικτο)	Vardis Marinakis	Petros Kalkovalis, Melina Tsabani	20 June 2021
Fotini cannot answer anymore. Alkis thrashes in pain. Nasos, Maya hear Manto's evidence. Police arrest Spyros, Nikitas for illegal mining. Ioulia welcomed home by Athina, Thaleia. Vasilis to Mihalis: wait two days, get ransom, escape to Türkiye. Chief: Financial Crimes investigating quarry; unconnected with kidnap case. Vasilis to Athina: Manto should have waited until children returned. Thaleia to Nasos: do not recognise Sakis. Thaleia: Yerasimos's recent quarry accident. Ioulia consoles Manto. Elpida complains about Alkis's fever. Mihalis reveals his face. Yerasimos: crushed by quarry rockfall. Vasilis wanted Spyros damaged. Yerasimos took payment after Spyros's thugs trashed home. Police raid Sakis's haunts; discover photo: Sakis, Mihalis, Fani. Nasos, Thaleia kiss. Athina stays with Thaleia. Thaleia left home due to Margarita's death. Vasilis takes drugs, brandishes gun. Petros enters, shocked. Mihalis places ailing Alkis into car. Elpida soothes Aristea. Vasilis snaps, bashes Petros to death. Disguised, Mihalis stops car near campervan. Puts Alkis into chair, returns to car as police car arrives. Police order Mihalis to stop, they fire at each other; policeman injured. Vasilis disposes of Petros's corpse. Police pursue Mihalis. Nikitas to Manto: Alkis hospitalised. Mihalis hides in stables. Nasos, Mihalis fight. Vasilis sees TV news: police arrest Mihalis.
12	"Separate Ways" (Ξέχωροι Δρόμοι)	Vardis Marinakis	Petros Kalkovalis, Melina Tsabani	27 June 2021
Athina to Spyros: Alkis's asleep. Mihalis refuses to reveal kidnappers, hostages or Iasonas's locations. Ioulia gives Margarita's effects to Thaleia. Iraklis to Spyros: talking to financial investigators. Dimos argues against paying ransom, kidnappers will flee, use children as human shields. Dimos: arranges to freeze parents' bank accounts. Vasilis: dropped Petros downtown. Thaleia reads Margarita's message to Thomas. Vasilis to Sakis: prepare to leave. Elpida to Aristea: do not give up. Alkis wakes; doctors removed intestinal tapeworm. After hours of questioning, Mihalis attacks Nasos; subdued by others. Thomas to Thaleia: Margarita learnt about Leonidas's death. Kourtidis: Iasonas's call came from Vathi, near Spyros or Athina's. Vasilis plays fake message for Athina: kidnappers demand 10 million for Aristea. 25 years ago: Young Thaleia sees Spyros, Margarita arguing about accident. Present: Alkis describes kidnappers, hostage house. Mihalis: Sakis accidentally killed Savvas. Alkis remembers seeing painted sign with horses. Elpida, children start packing. Vasilis takes money, orders Athina: no phoning others. Thaleia confronts Spyros: faking Leonidas's accident with Iraklis, destroying Kyriaki's life, driving Iasonas to take vengeance on grandchildren. Spyros: maintained rich lifestyle. When kidnappers are distracted, Aristea sneaks out. Athina discovers Petros's necklace. At hostage house, Vasilis shoots dead Fani, Sakis. Aristea sees Vasilis.
13	"Manhunt" (Ανθρωποκυνηγητό)	Vardis Marinakis	Petros Kalkovalis, Melina Tsabani	4 July 2021
Ioulia informs Spyros: preparing lunch. After she exits, Spyros shoots himself dead. Aristea doubts Vasilis's story, runs off. Vasilis catches her. Police approach hostage house. Maya: Spyros killed himself. Thaleia to Dimos: Spyros admitted: falsified Leonidas's death. Vasilis drives Aristea to shack. Police enter hostage house; free Elpida, children. Aristea's missing. Vasilis packs bags. Athina describes kidnappers' message: paid for Aristea; she also displays Petros's necklace. Vasilis books flight, sedates Aristea. Elpida sorrowful for Savvas's death. Parents applaud Eplida's efforts, children cuddle her. Vasilis disguises himself, drives Aristea away. Mihalis sees Fani, Sakis were shot dead; confirms Iasonas is Vasilis: planned kidnapping. Mihalis chose Thaleia because she would see through Spyros's lies. Thaleia tells Athina about Vasilis's betrayal; Athina collapses. Police discover Petros's corpse in shack's garden. Orpheus returns home. Vasilis enters aerodrome, police stop his car. He refuses to cooperate, police draw their guns. Vasilis shows live grenade. Violeta to Danae: ashamed of previous actions. Squad arrives at aerodrome. Thaleia, Athina see news report: Vasilis, Aristea. Vasilis demands plane, pilot to leave country. Thaleia volunteers to recover Aristea. Thaleia convinces Vasilis to release Aristea. Vasilis blows himself up. Six months later People celebrate Aristea's birthday. Nasos surrounded by children.
