= Golden Goblet Award for Best Actress =

Chinese film award

The Golden Goblet Award for Best Actress (Chinese: 金爵奖最佳女演员) is a prize given to actresses in the main category of competition at the Shanghai International Film Festival.

== Award winners ==
Year	Film	Actress
1993	Sopyonje	(South Korea) Jung-hae Oh
1995	Red Cherry	(China) Guo Keyu
1996	Sur un air de mambo	(France) Catherine Jacob
1997	Settlement	(China) Pan Yu
1999	Genghis Khan	(China) Ai Liya
2001	Money Is Not Everything	(Poland) Stanisława Celińska
2001	The Full Moon	(China) Peng Yu
2002	Life Show	(China) Tao Hong
2003	no award this year	
2004	Shanghai Story	(Hong Kong) Josephine Koo
2005	A Time to Love	(China) Zhao Wei
2006	Love Belongs to Everyone	(Belgium) Els Dottermans
2007	According to the Plan	(Germany) Corinna Harfouch, Dagmar Manzel, Kirsten Block, Christine Schorn
2008	Václav	(Slovakia) Emília Vášáryová
2009	Aching Hearts	(Denmark) Simone Tang
2010	Kiss Me Again	(Italy) Vittoria Puccini
2011	Folk Songs Singing	(China) Lü Xingchen
2012	El sueño de Lu	(Mexico) Úrsula Pruneda
2013	Unbeatable	(Malaysia) Crystal Lee
2014	Little England	(Greece) Pinelopi Tsilika
2015	Wildeye	(Finland) Krista Kosonen
2016	The Projects	(Japan) Naomi Fujiyama
2017	Yellow	(Iran) Sareh Bayat
2018	Tadoussac	(Canada) Isabelle Blais
2019	Inhale-Exhale	(Georgia (country)) Salome Demuria
2021	Amateurs	(Poland) Marzena Gajewska
2023	Yoko	(Japan) Rinko Kikuchi
2024	The Divorce	(Kazakhstan) Omaroa Nira
2025	Wild Nights, Tamed Beasts	(China) Wan Qian
2026	Halima	(Morocco) Khadija Amari
