= Park (2016 film) =

2016 film

- Film poster
- Directed by: Sofia Exarchou
- Written by: Sofia Exarchou
- Starring: Dimitris Kitsos
- Music by: Alexander Voulgaris
- Release date: 9 September 2016 (TIFF)
- Running time: 100 minutes
- Countries: Greece; Poland
- Language: Greece

Park is a 2016 Greek-Polish drama film directed by Sofia Exarchou. It was selected to be screened in the Discovery section at the 2016 Toronto International Film Festival.

== Cast ==
- Dimitris Kitsos as Dimitris
- Dimitra Vlagopoulou as Anna
- Thomas Bo Larsen as Jens
- Enuki Gvenatadze as Markos
- Lena Kitsopoulou as Dimitris' Mother
- Yorgos Pandeleakis as Mother's boyfriend
