= Kai oi Pantremenoi Ehoun Psyhi =

Greek television series

- Και οι Παντρεμένοι Έχουν Ψυχή
- Created by: Lefteris Kaponis
- Starring: Antonis Kafetzopoulos; Yorgos Partsalakis; Maria Tsombanaki; Renia Louizidou; Konstadina Mihael; Aspasia Tzitzikaki; Maria Papalambrou; Alexandros Koliopoulos; Karmen Rouggeri
- Country of origin: Greece
- No. of seasons: 3

Production
- Running time: 35-45 minutes

Original release
- Network: ANT1
- Release: October 1997 – June 2000

Kai oi Pantremenoi Ehoun Psihi is a Greek television series that was aired by ANT1 for three seasons, in period 1997–2000. It was written by Lefteris Kaponis and was directed by Antonis Tempos. The series stars Antonis Kafetzopoulos and Giorgos Partsalakis. It has high viewership and was existed television success of that period. In 2013, the series was adapted for a cinema film with the name Akalyptos.

== Plot ==
Three married couples: Andreas, nicknamed “Akalyptos” (The Uncovered) because of his unpaid debts, is the charming, handsome ladies' man who loves to party but is drowning in debt. He constantly cheats on his wife, Aliki, but when he notices signs of her own infidelity, he goes mad and collapses emotionally. His friend, Makis, a dentist married to Rena with a daughter, lives a predictable life until he falls passionately in love with a young dancer. His life turns upside down, dramatically and comically, as he's completely inexperienced in cheating and keeps making blunders. His wife, initially unaware, starts noticing something’s off and, once she figures it out, decides to change her approach. The third couple in the story is Renos and Betty. She owns a boutique in Kolonaki, is dynamic and expressive, while Renos is trying to write a novel that never seems to get finished.

== Cast ==
- Antonis Kafetzopoulos
- Yorgos Partsalakis
- Maria Tsombanaki
- Renia Louizidou
- Konstadina Mihael
- Aspasia Tzitzikaki
- Maria Papalambrou
- Alexandros Koliopoulos
- Karmen Rouggeri
