= Thread (film) =

- Theatrical release poster
- Directed by: Alexander Voulgaris
- Written by: Alexander Voulgaris
- Produced by: Eleni Bertes
- Starring: Sofia Kokkali; Vangelis Loukissas; Daphne Patakia
- Cinematography: Simos Sarketzis
- Edited by: Panos Voutsaras
- Production companies: Logline; Greek Film Center; Hellenic Radio & Television
- Distributed by: Weird Wave
- Release dates: 9 November 2016 (Thessaloniki International Film Festival); 7 December 2017 (Greece)
- Running time: 94 minutes
- Country: Greece
- Language: Greek

Thread (Greek: Νήμα, romanized: Nima) is a 2016 Greek film written and directed by Alexander Voulgaris (credited as "The Boy"). It stars Sofia Kokkali, Vangelis Loukissas and Daphne Patakia. It was distributed worldwide by Heretic Outreach.

== Accolades ==
Event	Category	Nominee	Result	Ref.
Hellenic Film Academy Awards	Best Feature Film	Eleni Bertes	Nominated	
Hellenic Film Academy Awards	Best Director	Alexander Voulgaris	Nominated	
Hellenic Film Academy Awards	BestCinematography	Simos Sarketzis	Nominated	
Hellenic Film Academy Awards	Best Actress	Sofia Kokkali	Won	
Hellenic Film Academy Awards	Best Editing	Panos Voutsaras	Nominated	
Hellenic Film Academy Awards	Best Make-up	Ioanna Lygizou	Nominated	
Hellenic Film Academy Awards	Best Music	Alexander Voulgaris and Yannis Veslemes	Nominated	
Hellenic Film Academy Awards	Best Costume Design	Alkistis Mamali	Nominated	
Hellenic Film Academy Awards	Best Production Design	Alexander Voulgaris and Konstantinos Labridis	Nominated	
Hellenic Film Academy Awards	Award for Special Effects and Film Innovation	Prokopis Vlaseros and Giannis Ageladopoulos	Nominated	
LA Film Festival	Nightfall Award	Alexander Voulgaris	Nominated	
