= Janis Rafailidou =

Greek artist

Janis Rafailidou (also known as Janis Rafa), born in Greece 1984, is an artist engaging with sculpture, video art and film. She was recently featured in the 59th International Art Exhibition La Biennale di Venezia with her 2020 short film Lacerate, and her work has been acquired by various institutions, such as Centraal Museum, Stedelijk Museum, and Fondazione in Between Art Film. Her solo exhibition at the iconic Eye Filmmuseum 2023, showcased videos, films and large-scale sculptures, establishing her practice in the dichotophy of art and film.

== Life and work ==
In 2012 Rafailidou obtained a PhD in Fine Art at the University of Leeds. Between 2013 and 2014, she was a resident at the Rijksakademie and in 2020 she was awarded a fellowship at ARTWORKS by S. Niarchos Foundation. It was during her residency at the Dutch Rijksakademie that she began shifting her focus from video art to film. She is now living and working between Athens and Amsterdam. Her debut feature film, Kala azar, 2020 premiered and awarded at IFFR and New Directors/ New Films at Moma.

== Selected works ==
=== 2010 ===
- Dad Where Are You?
- I Thought I Found You But I Was Looking on Footage of a Different Country
- I Thought I Found You, Dad Where Are You?

=== 2012 ===
- Exit K1

The title of this film refers to a road exit in the outskirts of Athens (GR), "Exit K1", that leads away from the city, onto a dirt road. There, clandestine migrants travel "invisibly", avoiding the immediate metropolitan area. The work explores the reality of Greek periphery through the citizens' perspective.

=== 2013 ===
- Three Farewells

This piece consists of three videos shot in 4K, 2.40:1 with stereo sound, namely: Father Gravedigger (20’); Our Dead Dogs (17’); The Last Burial (25’). The trilogy evades anthropocentric conceptions of death, mourning and melancholia, framing them in a post-human narrative. Each video narrates a burial, exploring the common vulnerability and shared pain between humans and non-humans. The work exemplifies Rafalidou's cinematic narrative as characterised by a realism suspended between personal impression and actuality.

- Our Dead Dogs
- Father Gravedigger
- The Last Burial
- 8 Kilos of Garden

=== 2014 ===
- Requiem to a Shipwreck
- A Sign of Prosperity to the Dreamer
- Gravediggers

=== 2015 ===
- Configuration of the Man Who Has Seen Without Being Seen
- Requiem to a Fatal Incident
- Winter Came Early

=== 2016 ===
- Untitled
- There She Blows
- The Thin Crust of Earth
- Covers

=== 2018 ===
- Take 11: What Remains Is a Wound Disembodied
- Covers, Footplates#1–2
- Another 10kg of Garden

=== 2019 ===
- Take 11 (installation)
- Verism#1–5
- In the Flat Field #5818
- Verism#2–5
- Another 10kg of Garden, and Another 15 kg of Garden (We Know This is A.)

=== 2020 ===
- Kala Azar

The protagonists of Kala Azar are a couple that works in an animal crematorium and illegally cremate roadkill animals. The film is set in a surrealist universe created by Rafalidou and filled with landscapes, animals, living and dead bodies. Kala Azar has participated in thirty-eight film festivals, among which the 49th International Film Festival Rotterdam and the Hong Kong International Film Festival (2020), receiving a total of nine awards.

- Lacerate

=== 2021 ===
- Waiting for Time to Pass
- I Am the Daughter of a Sheep

== Selected exhibitions ==
=== 2015 ===
- Palazzo Strozzi

=== 2016 ===
- Janis Rafa and The Fear of Leaving the Animal Forever Forgotten Under the Ground, EYE Filmmuseum (Amsterdam, NL), from 2016 to 2021.

=== 2017 ===
- Kunsthalle Munster
- Centre d'Art Contemporaine Chanot
- Palazzo Medici Riccardi

=== 2018 ===
- Mardin Biennial
- Manifesta 12

=== 2019 ===
- [solo-exhibition] Eaten by Non-Humans, Centraal Museum (Utrecht, NL), from 2019 to 2020.

=== 2020 ===
- MAXXI
- State of Concept Athens

=== 2021 ===
- Bucharest Biennial
- Goethe-Institut (GR, 2021)

=== 2022 ===
- The Milk of Dreams, Venice Biennale

=== 2022 ===
- [solo-exhibition] Feed Me. Eat Me. Cheat Me., Eye Filmmuseum
