= Kala azar (film) =

2020 fantasy drama film

- Directed by: Janis Rafailidou (as Janis Rafa)
- Written by: Janis Rafailidou
- Produced by: Giorgos Kyriakos; Kostas Lambropoulos
- Starring: Pinelope Tsilika; Dimitris Lalos; Michele Valley; Tasos Rafailidis
- Cinematography: Thodoros Mihopoulos
- Edited by: Patrick Minks
- Music by: Gwil Sainsbury
- Production companies: VStudio Nieuwe Gronden; Heretic; Greek Film Center
- Release date: 1 February 2020; (International Film Festival Rotterdam)
- Running time: 91 minutes
- Country: Greece
- Language: Greek

Kala azar (Literal translation: Black Fever) is a 2020 Greek film written and directed by Janis Rafailidou.

The plot focuses on a young couple (Pinelope Tsilika and Dimitris Lalos) who collect and cremate dead pets and return the ashes to their owners.

== Cast ==
- Pinelope Tsilika as Penelope
- Dimitris Lalos as Dimitris
- Michele Valley as Mother
- Tasos Rafailidis as Father
- Pavlos Kourtidis as Security man at crematorium

== Accolades ==
Award	Category	Nominee	Result	Ref.
International Film Festival Rotterdam	KNF Award	Janis Rafailidou	Won	
International Film Festival Rotterdam	Tiger Award	Janis Rafailidou	Nominated	
Hong Kong International Film Festival	Special Mention	Janis Rafailidou	Won	
