= Penelope Tsilika =

Greek actress

Penelope Tsilika (Greek: Πηνελόπη Τσιλίκα; born in 1988) is a Greek actress. Tsilika starred in the 2013 film Little England directed by Pantelis Voulgaris. Her other film credits include The Interrogation and Kala azar. She was also one of the stars of the television series I lexi pou de les and lead actress in Silent Road (2021, Σιωπηλός δρόμος).

Tsilka was born in Athens. She is a graduate of the Athens Academy of Drama and Athens Law School.

== Filmography ==
Year	Title	Role	Notes
2013	Little England	Orsa Saltaferou	Nominee - Hellenic Film Academy Award for Best Actress
2023	Murderess	Delhcaro, Hadoula's daughter	

== Awards and nominations ==
Year	Award	Category	Nominated work	Result	Ref
2014	Hellenic Film Academy Awards	Best Actress	Little England	Nominated	
2014	Golden Goblet Award	Best Actress	Little England	Won	
2020	Hellenic Film Academy Awards	Best Actress	The Interrogation	Nominated	
2021	Hellenic Film Academy Awards	Best Actress	Kala Azar	Nominated	
