= Ioanna Karystiani =

Greek screenwriter

- Born: 8 September 1952 (age 73); Chania, Kingdom of Greece
- Education: University of Athens
- Spouse: Pantelis Voulgaris
- Children: 2

Ioanna Karystiani (Greek: Ιωάννα Καρυστιάνη; born 8 September 1952) is a Greek screenwriter and winner of the Greek National Book Award.

== Biography ==
Ioanna Karystiani was born in 1952 in Chania in Crete in a family from Asia Minor. She took up Law Studies and worked as a cartoonist for several media outlets, among them the Greek communist newspaper Rizospastis (Greek Ριζοσπάστης) and the magazines Tetarto, Ena and Eikones. She has also worked as a scriptwriter and made a name for herself within the Greek film industry.

She lives in Athens and the Greek island of Andros and is married to the Greek film director Pantelis Voulgaris. They have two children. They have worked together in films such as Nyfes, Psyhi Vathia and To Teleftaio Simeioma.

Ioanna Karystiani has had success with her short stories book I kyria Kataki (Mrs Kataki) and her novel Mikra Anglia (Little England, published in English as The Jasmine Island) in which she describes the romances, lives and work of a family in the sailor community of the island of Andros in the first half of the twentieth century. The novel achieved the Greek National Award for Literature and was also made into the 2013 film Little England.

== Sources ==
- http://d-nb.info/gnd/122927664
- http://www.europaeditions.com/author.php?Id=15
- http://www.literaturfestival.com/bios1_3_6_316.html
