= Alexandros Papadiamantis =

Greek writer (1851-1911)

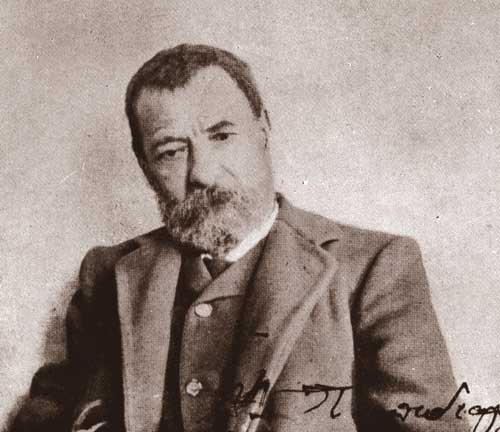
- Born: 3 March 1851; Skiathos, Greece
- Died: 3 January 1911 (aged 59); Skiathos, Greece
- Notable work: The Murderess

Alexandros Papadiamantis (Greek: Ἀλέξανδρος Παπαδιαμάντης [papaðʝaˈma(n)dis]; 4 March 1851 – 3 January 1911) was an influential Greek novelist, short-story writer and poet.

== Biography ==
Papadiamantis was born in Greece, on the island of Skiathos, in the western part of the Aegean Sea. The island would figure prominently in his work. His father was a priest. He moved to Athens as a young man to complete his high school studies, and enrolled at the School of Philosophy of the University of Athens, but never completed his studies. This happened because he had economic difficulties, and had to find a job to make a living.

During his stay in Athens, he lived in the poor neighbourhood of Psyri and his daily life was spent in this area as well as in the neighbouring Monastiraki. As a result, his heroes and stories were influenced not only by the island of Skiathos, but also by these two areas of Athens.

He returned to his native island in later life, where he would spend the rest of his life and eventually pass away there in 1911. He supported himself by writing throughout his adult life, anything from journalism and short stories to several serialized novels. From a certain point onwards he had become very popular, and newspapers and magazines vied for his writings, offering him substantial fees. Papadiamantis did not care for money, and would often ask for lower fees if he thought they were unfairly high; furthermore, he distributed his earnings to those who needed it more and took no care of his clothing and appearance. Indicative of his relationship with money is the incident reported by the novelist Pavlos Nirvanas: when Papadiamantis started his collaboration with the newspaper "Asty", the director offered him 150 drachmas as a salary. Papadiamantis' answer was: "One hundred and fifty are too many. A hundred is enough for me"

He never married, and was known to be a recluse, whose only true cares were observing and writing about the life of the poor and of spiritual figures, as well as chanting at church: he was referred to as "kosmokalogeros" (κοσμοκαλόγερος, "secular monk"). He died of pneumonia.

== Works ==
Papadiamantis' longest works were the serialized novels The Gypsy Girl, The Emigrant, and The Merchants of Nations. These were adventures set around the Mediterranean, with rich plots involving captivity, war, pirates, the plague, etc. However, the author is best remembered for around 170 short stories. Written in his own version of the then official language of Greece, "katharevousa" (a "purist" written language heavily influenced by ancient Greek), Papadiamantis' stories provide lucid and lyrical portraits of country life in Skiathos, or urban life in the poorer neighborhoods of Athens, with frequent flashes of deep psychological insight. The nostalgia for a lost island childhood is palpable in most of them; the stories with an urban setting often deal with alienation. Characters are sketched with a deft hand, and they speak in the authentic "demotic" spoken language of the people; island characters lapse into dialect. Papadiamantis' deep Christian faith, complete with the mystical feeling associated with the Orthodox Christian liturgy, suffuses many stories. Most of his work is tinged with melancholy, and resonates with empathy with people's suffering, regardless of whether they are saints or sinners, innocent or conflicted. However, he feels nothing but contempt for the wealthy, landowners, minor aristocracy and others who "live off of the blood of the common people". His only saint, in fact, is a poor shepherd who, having warned the islanders, is slaughtered by Saracen pirates after he refuses to abandon his flock for the safety of the fortified town. This particular story, The Poor Saint, is the closest he comes to a truly religious theme.

An example of Papadiamantis' deep and even-handed feeling for humanity is his acknowledged masterpiece, the novella The Murderess. It is the story of an old woman in Skiathos, who pities families with many daughters: given their low socioeconomic status, girls could not work before marriage and they could not marry unless they provide a dowry; therefore, they were a burden and a plight to their families. After killing her own newborn granddaughter, gravelly ill with pertussis, she crosses the line from pity to what she believes is useful and appropriate action, the "mercy killing" of young girls. She kills three young girls in succession by throwing them into wells and then pretending to be trying to save them in order to justify her presence there. As coincidences keep piling up, she is confronted with a stark fact: her assumption that she was helping was monstrously wrong, and she gradually slips into mad torment. She flees arrest and tries to hide in the wilderness, but drowns in the sea while trying to escape two policemen on her trail; as Papadiamantis puts it, she meets "death half-way between divine and human justice". The character of the murderess is depicted with deep empathy and without condemnation. "As a child, she served her parents. Once married, she was her husband's slave... when she had children, she served them, and when they had children, she became their slave". Even her name tells the story of women in 19th century rural Greece: her birth name, Hadoula, "tenderling", is all but forgotten; she now is the "Fragkoyannoú", i.e. the widow of Yannis Fragkos, her whole existence referenced only to the name of her late, good-for-nothing husband.

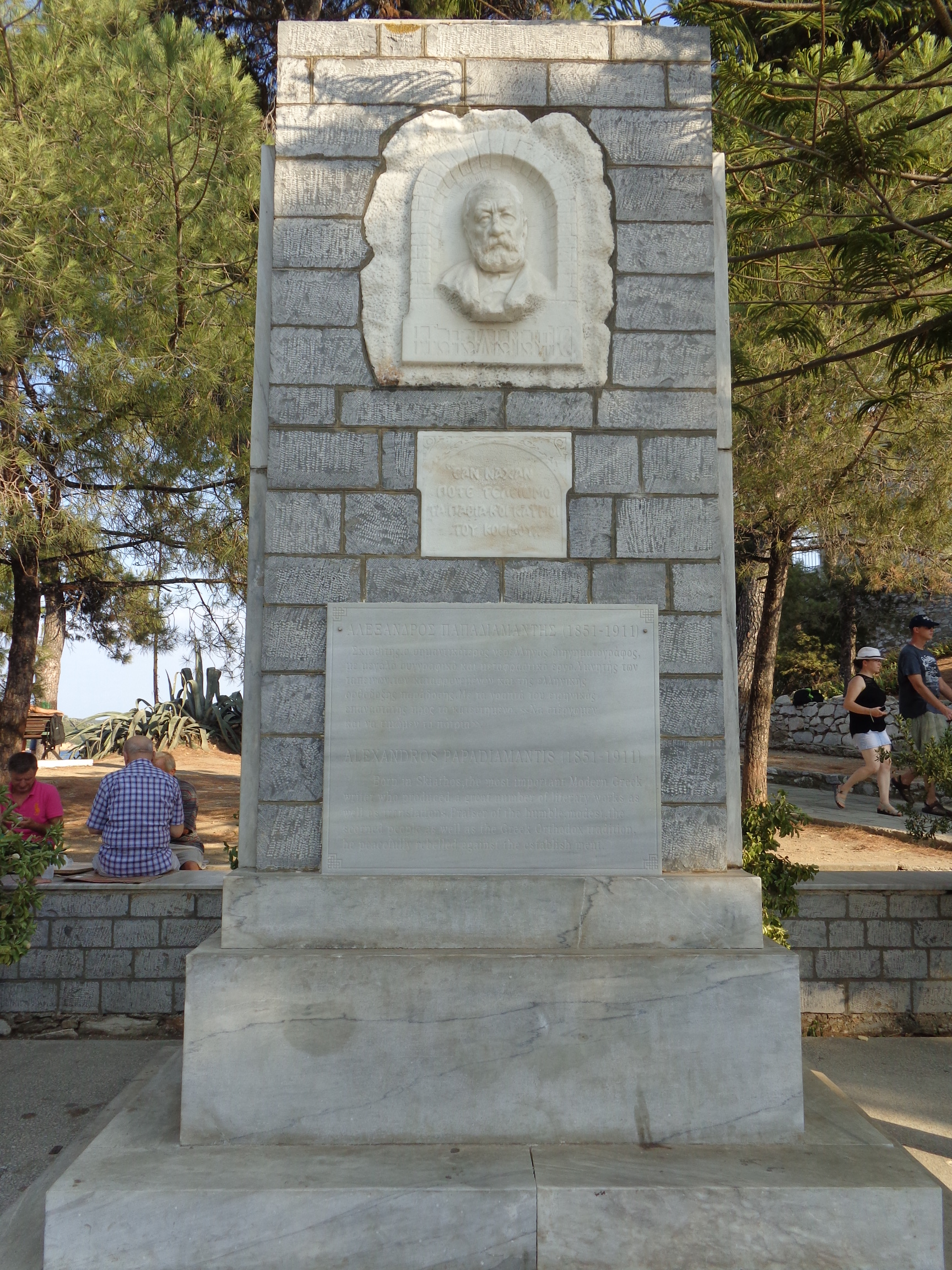
Monument in Skiathos

His work is seminal in Modern Greek literature: he is for Greek prose what Dionysios Solomos is for poetry. As Odysseas Elytis wrote: "commemorate Dionysios Solomos, commemorate Alexander Papadiamantis". It is a body of work, however, that is virtually impossible to translate, as the magic of his language is founded on the Greek diglossia: elaborately crafted, high Katharevousa for the narrative, interspersed with authentic local dialect for the dialogue, and with all dialectical elements used in the narrative formulated in strict Katharevousa, and therefore in forms that had never actually existed.

== Selected works ==
=== Novels ===
- Η Μετανάστις (1880). The Emigrant
- Οι Έμποροι των Εθνών (1883). The Merchants of Nations, trans. Michail Tzoufras (2016)
- Η Γυφτοπούλα (1884). The Gypsy Girl

=== Novellas and short stories ===
- Χρήστος Μηλιόνης (1885). Christos Milionis
- Οι Ελαφροΐσκιωτοι (1892). Fey Folk: A Tale from Skiathos, trans. David Connolly (Athens: Aiora Press, 2013, ISBN 978-618-5048-06-8)
- Ολόγυρα στη λίμνη (1892). Around the Lagoon: Reminiscences to a Friend (bilingual edition), trans. Peter Mackridge (Limni: Denise Harvey, 2014) ISBN 978-960-7120-33-5
- Βαρδιάνος στα σπόρκα (1893). Guardian of the Plague Ships
- Η Φόνισσα (1903). The Murderess, trans. George X. Xanthopoulides (1977); trans. Peter Levi (1983); trans. Liadain Sherrard (Limni: Denise Harvey, 2011, ISBN 978-960-7120-28-1)
- Τα ρόδινα ακρογιάλια (1908). The Rosy Shores

=== Compilations in English ===
- Tales from a Greek Island, trans. Elizabeth Constantinides (Johns Hopkins University Press, 1987). Includes:
  - "Fortune from America" (Η Τύχη απ' την Αμέρικα, 1901)
  - "The Homesick Wife" (Η νοσταλγός, 1894)
  - "The Haunted Bridge" (Η Στοιχειωμένη καμάρα, 1904)
  - "The Matchmaker" (Ο Πανδρολόγος, 1902)
  - "The Bewitching of the Aga" (Ο Αβασκαμός του Αγά, 1896)
  - "Civilization in the Village" (Ο Πολιτισμός εις το χωρίον, 1891)
  - "A Dream among the Waters" (Όνειρο στο κύμα, 1900)
  - "A Shrew of a Mother" (Στρίγλα μάννα, 1902)
  - "Love the Harvester" (Θέρος – Έρος, 1891)
  - "The Voice of the Dragon" (Η Φωνή του Δράκου, 1904)
  - "The Marriage of Karahmet" (Ο γάμος του Καραχμέτη, 1914)
  - "The American" (Ο Αμερικάνος, 1891)
- The Boundless Garden: Selected Short Stories, Volume I, various translators (Limni: Denise Harvey, 2007), ISBN 978-960-7120-21-2
- The Boundless Garden: Selected Short Stories, Volume II, various translators (Limni: Denise Harvey, 2019)
- Excerpts of various Papadiamántian works have also been translated by Fr. Ioannis Fortomas on his Wordpress blog “Papadiamántianpriest”

== See also ==
- Greek literature
